= List of PC games (C) =

The following page is an alphabetical section from the list of PC games.

== C ==
| Name | Developer | Publisher | Genre(s) | Operating system(s) | Date released |
|---|---|---|---|---|---|
| Call of Cthulhu: Dark Corners of the Earth | Headfirst Productions | Bethesda Softworks | Survival horror, first-person shooter | Microsoft Windows | October 24, 2005 |
| Call of Duty | Infinity Ward | MediaQuest, Activision, Aspyr | Action, FPS | Microsoft Windows, macOS | October 29, 2003 |
| Call of Duty 2 | Infinity Ward | Konami, Activision, Aspyr | Action, FPS | Microsoft Windows, macOS | October 25, 2005 |
| Call of Duty 4: Modern Warfare | Infinity Ward | Square Enix, Activision | Action, FPS | Microsoft Windows, macOS | November 5, 2007 |
| Call of Duty: Advanced Warfare | Sledgehammer Games | Activision | First-person shooter | Microsoft Windows | November 4, 2014 |
| Call of Duty: Black Ops | Treyarch, n-Space | Square Enix, Activision | Action, FPS | Microsoft Windows, macOS | November 9, 2010 |
| Call of Duty: Black Ops II | Treyarch | Square Enix, Activision | Action, FPS | Microsoft Windows | December 12, 2012 |
| Call of Duty: Black Ops III | Treyarch | Activision | FPS | Microsoft Windows | November 6, 2015 |
| Call of Duty: Black Ops IIII | Treyarch | Activision | FPS | Microsoft Windows | October 12, 2018 |
| Call of Duty: Black Ops Cold War | Treyarch; Raven Software | Activision | First-person shooter | Microsoft Windows | November 13, 2020 |
| Call of Duty: Black Ops 6 | Treyarch; Raven Software | Activision | First-person shooter | Microsoft Windows | October 25, 2024 |
| Call of Duty: Black Ops 7 | Treyarch; Raven Software | Activision | First-person shooter | Microsoft Windows | November 14, 2025 |
| Call of Duty: Ghosts | Infinity Ward | Square Enix, Activision | Action, FPS | Microsoft Windows | November 5, 2013 |
| Call of Duty: Infinite Warfare | Infinity Ward | Activision | First-person shooter | Microsoft Windows | November 4, 2016 |
| Call of Duty: Modern Warfare 2 | Infinity Ward | Activision, Square Enix | Action, FPS | Microsoft Windows, macOS | November 10, 2009 |
| Call of Duty: Modern Warfare 3 | Sledgehammer Games, Treyarch, Infinity Ward, Raven Software | Square Enix, Activision | Action, FPS | Microsoft Windows, macOS | November 8, 2011 |
| Call of Duty: Modern Warfare (2019) | Infinity Ward | Activision | First-person shooter | Microsoft Windows | October 25, 2019 |
| Call of Duty: Modern Warfare II (2022) | Infinity Ward | Activision | First-person shooter | Microsoft Windows | October 28, 2022 |
| Call of Duty: Modern Warfare III (2023) | Sledgehammer Games | Activision | First-person shooter | Microsoft Windows | November 10, 2023 |
| Call of Duty Online | Tencent, Raven Software | Tencent | Action, FPS | Microsoft Windows | January 14, 2013 |
| Call of Duty: United Offensive | Gray Matter Studios, MediaQuest, Aspyr | Activision | Action, FPS | Microsoft Windows, macOS | September 14, 2004 |
| Call of Duty: World at War | Exakt Entertainment, Rebellion Developments, Treyarch, n-Space | Activision Blizzard | Action, FPS | Microsoft Windows | November 11, 2008 |
| Call of Duty: Warzone | Raven Software; Infinity Ward | Activision | Battle royale, FPS | Microsoft Windows | March 10, 2020 |
| Call of Duty: Warzone 2.0 | Raven Software; Infinity Ward | Activision | Battle royale, FPS | Microsoft Windows | November 16, 2022 |
| Cardfight!! Vanguard Dear Days 2 | FuRyu | Bushiroad Games | Digital collectible card game | Microsoft Windows | January 30, 2025 |
| CarneyVale: Showtime | Singapore-MIT GAMBIT Game Lab | Microsoft Game Studios | Platformer | Microsoft Windows | November 11, 2010 |
| Castlevania: Lords of Shadow | MercurySteam, Kojima Productions, Climax Studios | Konami | Action-adventure, hack and slash | Microsoft Windows | October 5, 2010 |
| Cast n Chill | Wombat Brawler | | Cozy, Fishing | Microsoft Windows, MacOS | June 16, 2025 |
| Cat Cafe Manager | Roost Games | Freedom Games | Simulation | Microsoft Windows, Linux, macOS | April 14, 2022 |
| Champions of Krynn | Strategic Simulations, Inc. | Strategic Simulations, Inc., U.S. Gold | Fantasy, RPG | MS-DOS, Apple II, Commodore 64, Amiga | June 1, 1990 |
| Changed | DragonSnow | DragonSnow | Survival RPG | Microsoft Windows | 2018 |
| Chaos Island: The Lost World | DreamWorks Interactive | DreamWorks Interactive | Real-time strategy | Microsoft Windows | October 30, 1997 |
| Chivalry: Medieval Warfare | Torn Banner Studios | Torn Banner Studios | Action, first-person slasher | Microsoft Windows, Linux, macOS | October 16, 2012 |
| Cities in Motion | Colossal Order | Paradox Interactive | Business simulation | Microsoft Windows, Linux, macOS | February 23, 2011 |
| Cities in Motion 2 | Colossal Order | Paradox Interactive | Business simulation | Microsoft Windows, Linux, macOS | April 2, 2013 |
| Cities: Skylines | Colossal Order | Paradox Interactive | City-building, Simulation | Microsoft Windows, Linux, macOS | March 10, 2015 |
| Cities: Skylines II | Colossal Order, Iceflake Studios | Paradox Interactive | City-building, Simulation | Microsoft Windows | October 24, 2023 |
| Cities XL | Monte Cristo | Monte Cristo | City-building game, massively multiplayer online game | Microsoft Windows | October 8, 2009 |
| Civilization III | Firaxis Games, Westlake Interactive, Aspyr | Atari, Aspyr | Turn-based strategy | Microsoft Windows, macOS | October 30, 2001 |
| Civilization III: Conquests | Firaxis Games, BreakAway Games | Atari | Turn-based strategy | Microsoft Windows | November 4, 2003 |
| Civilization III: Play the World | Firaxis Games | | Turn-based strategy | Microsoft Windows, macOS | October 31, 2002 |
| Civilization IV | Firaxis Games | 2K Games, Aspyr | Turn-based strategy | Microsoft Windows, macOS | October 25, 2005 |
| Civilization V | Firaxis Games | 2K Games, Aspyr | Turn-based strategy | Microsoft Windows, Linux, macOS | September 21, 2010 |
| Civilization V: Brave New World | Firaxis Games | 2K Games, Aspyr | Turn-based strategy | Microsoft Windows, Linux, macOS | March 15, 2013 |
| Civilization V: Gods & Kings | Firaxis Games | 2K Games, Aspyr | Turn-based strategy | Microsoft Windows, Linux, macOS | February 16, 2012 |
| Civilization VI | Firaxis Games | 2K Games | Turn-based strategy | Microsoft Windows, macOS | October 21, 2016 |
| Civilization VII | Firaxis Games | 2K Games | Turn-based strategy | Microsoft Windows, macOS, Linux | February 11, 2025 |
| Clans to Kingdoms | Clans to Kingdoms | Clans to Kingdoms | 4X, Turn-based strategy, City-building | Microsoft Windows | April 15, 2019 |
| Classic British Motor Racing | Data Design Interactive | Bold Games | Racing | Microsoft Windows | January 2, 2008 |
| Clockwork Revolution | InXile Entertainment | Xbox Game Studios | Action role-playing | Microsoft Windows | TBA |
| The Club | Bizarre Creations | Sega | Third-person shooter | Microsoft Windows | February 7, 2008 |
| Cobalt | Oxeye Game Studio | Mojang | Action, sidescroller | Microsoft Windows, Linux, macOS | February 2, 2016 |
| Code Vein | Bandai Namco Studios; Shift | Bandai Namco Entertainment | Action role-playing | Microsoft Windows | September 27, 2019 |
| Code Vein II | Bandai Namco Studios | Bandai Namco Entertainment | Action role-playing | Microsoft Windows | January 29, 2026 |
| Colin McRae Rally | Codemasters | Codemasters | Racing game | Microsoft Windows | September 28, 1998 |
| Colin McRae Rally 2.0 | Codemasters | Codemasters | Racing game | Microsoft Windows | December 8, 2000 |
| Colin McRae Rally 3 | Codemasters | Codemasters | Racing game | Microsoft Windows | August 25, 2002 |
| Colin McRae Rally 04 | Codemasters | Codemasters | Racing game | Microsoft Windows | April 2, 2004 |
| Colin McRae Rally 2005 | Codemasters | Codemasters (Win), Feral Interactive (OSX) | Racing game | Microsoft Windows, macOS | September 24, 2004 |
| Colin McRae: Dirt | Codemasters | Codemasters | Racing game | Microsoft Windows | June 15, 2007 |
| Colin McRae: Dirt 2 | Codemasters | Codemasters (Win), Feral Interactive (OSX) | Racing game | Microsoft Windows, macOS | September 8, 2009 |
| Microsoft Combat Flight Simulator | Microsoft | Microsoft | CFS, Flight Simulation | Microsoft Windows | October 28, 1998 |
| Command & Conquer | Westwood Studios | Virgin Interactive | RTS | MS-DOS, Microsoft Windows | August 31, 1995 |
| Command & Conquer: Red Alert | Westwood Studios | Virgin Interactive | RTS | MS-DOS, Microsoft Windows | November 22, 1996 |
| Command & Conquer: Generals | EA Pacific | EA Games | RTS | Microsoft Windows, Mac OS X | February 10, 2003 |
| Command & Conquer: Red Alert 2 | Westwood Pacific | EA Games | RTS | Microsoft Windows | October 26, 2000 |
| Command & Conquer: Red Alert 3 | EA Los Angeles | Electronic Arts | RTS | Microsoft Windows Mac OS X | October 28, 2008 |
| Command & Conquer: Renegade | Westwood Studios | EA Games | Tactical shooter | Microsoft Windows | February 26, 2002 |
| Command & Conquer: Tiberian Sun | Westwood Studios | Electronic Arts | RTS | Microsoft Windows | August 27, 1999 |
| Command & Conquer 3: Tiberium Wars | EA Los Angeles | Electronic Arts | RTS | Microsoft Windows, Mac OS X | March 26, 2007 |
| Command & Conquer 4: Tiberian Twilight | EA Los Angeles | Electronic Arts | RTS | Microsoft Windows | March 16, 2010 |
| Commandos: Behind Enemy Lines | Pyro Studios | Eidos Interactive | RTS | Microsoft Windows | July 31, 1998 |
| Commandos: Beyond the Call of Duty | Pyro Studios | Eidos Interactive | RTS | Microsoft Windows | March 31, 1999 |
| Commandos: Strike Force | Pyro Studios | Eidos Interactive | RTS | Microsoft Windows | March 17, 2006 |
| Commandos 2: Men of Courage | Pyro Studios | Eidos Interactive | RTS | Microsoft Windows | September 21, 2001 |
| Commandos 3: Destination Berlin | Pyro Studios | Eidos Interactive | RTS | Microsoft Windows | October 23, 2003 |
| Company of Heroes | Relic Entertainment | THQ | RTS | Microsoft Windows, macOS | September 12, 2006 |
| Company of Heroes 2 | Relic Entertainment | Sega | RTS | Microsoft Windows | June 25, 2013 |
| Constantine | Bits Studios | SCi Games | Action-adventure, third-person shooter | Microsoft Windows | February 14, 2005 |
| Contagion | Monochrome LLC | Monochrome LLC | First-person shooter | Microsoft Windows | April 14, 2014 |
| Cossacks II: Battle for Europe | GSC Game World | GSC World Publishing | RTS | Microsoft Windows | June 19, 2006 |
| Counter-Strike | Valve | Valve | First-person shooter | Microsoft Windows, Linux, macOS | June 19, 1999 |
| Counter-Strike: Condition Zero | Valve, Gearbox Software, Ritual Entertainment, Turtle Rock Studios | Valve | First-person shooter | Microsoft Windows, Linux, macOS | March 23, 2004 |
| Counter-Strike: Global Offensive | Valve | Valve | First-person shooter | Microsoft Windows, Linux, macOS | August 12, 2012 |
| Counter-Strike Online | Valve, Nexon Corporation | Valve, Nexon Corporation, Gamania | First-person shooter | Microsoft Windows | June 24, 2008 |
| Counter-Strike: Source | Valve | Valve | First-person shooter | Microsoft Windows, Linux, macOS | September 1, 2004 |
| Crusader Kings | Paradox Development Studios | Paradox Interactive | Grand strategy | Microsoft Windows, macOS | August 27, 2004 |
| Crusader Kings II | Paradox Development Studios | Paradox Interactive | Grand strategy | Microsoft Windows, Linux, macOS | February 14, 2012 |
| Cryostasis: Sleep of Reason | Action Forms | 1C, Aspyr, 505 Games | Survival horror | Microsoft Windows | February 27, 2009 |
| Crysis | Crytek | Electronic Arts | First-person shooter | Microsoft Windows | November 13, 2007 |
| Crysis Warhead | Crytek Budapest | Electronic Arts | First-person shooter | Microsoft Windows | September 16, 2008 |
| Crysis 2 | Crytek, Crytek UK | Electronic Arts | First-person shooter | Microsoft Windows | March 22, 2011 |
| Crysis 3 | Crytek, Crytek UK | Electronic Arts | First-person shooter | Microsoft Windows | February 19, 2013 |
| Cuphead | StudioMDHR | StudioMDHR | Action, run and gun | Microsoft Windows | September 29, 2017 |
| Curse of the Azure Bonds | Strategic Simulations, Inc. | Strategic Simulations, Inc., U.S. Gold, Pony Canyon, Inc. | Fantasy, RPG | MS-DOS, Apple II, macOS, Commodore 64, Amiga, Atari ST, NEC PC-9801 | September 1, 1989 |
| The Cursed Crusade | Kylotonn | Atlus | Action-adventure | Microsoft Windows | October 25, 2011 |
| Cooking Simulator | Big Cheese Studio | Big Cheese Studio, PlayWay S.A. | Simulation | Microsoft Windows, Nintendo Switch, Xbox One, Android, PlayStation 4 | June 6, 2019 |
| Crab Game | Daniel Sooman | Daniel Sooman | Party, Battle Royale | Linux, MacOS, Windows | October 29, 2021 |
