= Commando (disambiguation) =

A commando is an elite light infantry or special forces soldier, trained for quick raid operations, or a group of such soldiers.

Commando or Commandos may also refer to:

== Military ==
=== Units ===
- Royal Naval Commandos, a British World War II commando unit
- Royal Marine Commandos
- Commandos Marine
- Marine Commando Force
- Garud Commandos
- Para Commandos
- Commandos (Singapore Army) of the Singapore Army
- British Commandos, a special operations force created during World War II
- Portuguese Army Commandos, special forces unit of the Portuguese Army
- Commando Raiders, Laotian pathfinders and special forces during the Laotian Civil War
- Boer Commando (from 1658), the basic unit of organisation of the militia of the Boer people of South Africa
- Commandos, nickname of a 10th Mountain Division's brigade

=== Materiel ===
- Colt CAR-15 "Commando", a short-barrel assault rifle
- Curtiss C-46 Commando, an American transport aircraft
- Commando (aircraft), a very long range Consolidated Liberator II aircraft

=== Other ===
- Commando (pigeon), a World War II messenger pigeon who received the Dickin Medal
- an alternate term for military special forces

== Entertainment ==
=== Film and TV ===
- Commando (1962 film), the American International Pictures title of the film Marcia o Crepa
- Commandos (film), a 1968 World War II action film
- Commando (1985 film), a film starring Arnold Schwarzenegger
- Commando (1988 film), a Bollywood film by Babbar Subhash
- Commando (film series), Indian action film series
  - Commando: A One Man Army, a 2013 Bollywood action film, first installment in the series
- Commando (TV series), an Indian action thriller series
- Commandos, a meerkat group featured in Meerkat Manor
- "Commando", the nickname of Steve Willis, a trainer on the Australian TV program The Biggest Loser

=== Games ===
- Commando, an alternative name for the game Fugitive
- Commando (role-playing game), a 1979 role-playing game
- Commandos (series), a stealth-oriented real-time tactics computer game series
  - Commandos: Behind Enemy Lines, the first game in the series, released in 1998
- Commando (video game), a 1985 video game (unrelated to the film)
- Commando: Steel Disaster, a shoot em' up Nintendo DS game

=== Music ===
- Commandos (album), a 1986 album by Stage Dolls
- Commando (Niska album), a 2017 album by Niska
- "Commando", a song by Vanessa Paradis from the 2000 album Bliss
- "Commando", a song by Ramones from the album Leave Home
- "Commando", a song by Satyricon from the 2008 album The Age of Nero

=== Literature ===
- Commando (book), an autobiography of guitarist and songwriter Johnny Ramone
- Commando (comics), a British war comic
- Commando: A Boer Journal of the Boer War, a personal account of the Second Boer War by Deneys Reitz

== Vehicles ==
- Cadillac Gage Commando, an amphibious armored personnel carrier
- Norton Commando, a British motorcycle
- Commando Jeep, a light tactical vehicle
- Dodge 100 "Commando", a truck made by Dodge in Britain
- Jeepster Commando, a line of Jeep models
- "Commando", a series of high-performance engines made by Plymouth
- Commando, a former yacht converted into commercial service; see MV Star of Malta § Commercial service

== Other ==
- Commando (company), an American underwear company
- Commando (horse) (1898–1905), American Hall of Fame Thoroughbred racehorse
- Comandău (Kommandó in Hungarian), a commune in Covasna County, Romania
- Casio G'zOne Commando, an Android smartphone
- Colombo Commandos, a Sri Lankan domestic cricket team
- "Commando" connectors, a term for IEC 60309 power connectors
- A GUI tool for running command lines in the Macintosh Programmer's Workshop and later in A/UX
- "To go commando", a slang term for not wearing underwear

== See also ==
- Kommando, a generic German word meaning unit or command
- Commando 3 (disambiguation)
