= Kommando (disambiguation) =

Kommando can mean:

- Kommando, a German military term
- Boer Commando, Boer military units
- South African Commando System, South African military units
- Kommando 1944, an American short film depicting the internment of Japanese American citizens during World War II
- Comandău, a Romanian commune, called Kommandó in Hungarian

== See also ==
- Commando (disambiguation)
