= Dawn of Magic =

2005 video game

- Developer: SkyFallen Entertainment
- Publisher: 1C Company
- Engine: TheEngine
- Platform: Windows
- Release: RU: December 16, 2005; EU: April 27, 2007; NA: October 16, 2007
- Genre: Action role-playing game
- Modes: Single-player, multiplayer

Dawn of Magic is an action role-playing computer game developed by Russian studio SkyFallen Entertainment and was originally released under the name of Blood Magic (Russian: Магия Крови) by 1C Company on December 16, 2005. The game was released under its western title in April 2007 in Europe and in North America on October 16, with distribution handled by Deep Silver and Atari, respectively. An Xbox version was planned but cancelled.

A sequel titled Dawn of Magic 2 was released by Kalypso Media in the summer of 2009.

== Story ==
Dawn of Magic is set in a fantasy world. In the Absolute, the setting's afterlife, a being called Modo endangered his companions in pursuit of power. The inhabitants of the Absolute called a tribunal and sentenced Modo to be reborn on earth, live a mortal life (retaining his memories but none of his power) and die after 100 years.

The game begins 40 years after Modo was sentenced. He has gained knowledge of mortal magic and seeks to enlist the player character's aid in his plan to destroy the earth, escape his prison and live forever in the Absolute.

== Gameplay ==
Dawn of Magic features a 3D third person perspective game engine. The game world consists of area maps interlinked by portals. The player can choose from four starting characters, the Awkward Scholar, the Baker's Wife, the Weird Gypsy, and the Fat Friar. As the player character gains experience and levels, they improve basic attributes, skills in areas such as melee combat, trading, and crafting, and prowess in the game's twelve schools of magic. Each school of magic consists of eight spells; as the player gains prowess in a school of magic, their body morphs to take on characteristics reminiscent of the school.

== Release history ==
1C Company released the single-player action role-playing game Blood Magic (Russian: Магия Крови) in Russia on December 16, 2005. A stand-alone expansion pack, Blood Magic: Time of Shadows (Магия Крови: Время Теней), followed on November 24, 2006. The expansion featured a new story, upgraded interface, and multiplayer support via LAN or internet. In April 2007, Deep Silver released English, French, German and Italian localizations of Blood Magic for the European market. The Deep Silver release was renamed Dawn of Magic and featured upgraded gameplay including multiplayer support.

The Blood Magic game engine was licensed to KranX Productions for the action role-playing game A Farewell to Dragons.

== Reception ==
Reception

Aggregate score
Aggregator	Score
Metacritic	52/100

Review scores
Publication	Score
4Players	69%
Eurogamer	3/10
GameSpot	3/10
GameZone	5/10
IGN	(UK) 6.9/10 (US) 5.4/10
Jeuxvideo.com	11/20
PC Format	54%
PC Gamer (US)	34%
PC Games (DE)	70%
PC Zone	53%

The game received "mixed" reviews according to the review aggregation website Metacritic. GameSpot criticized the game's derivativeness, limited choices and numerous bugs. Martin Korda of IGN said that "despite its bold proclamations of reinventing the tried and tested Diablo template, Dawn of Magic remains an RPG with more than a whiff of the past hanging around it", while Emily Balistrieri of the same site criticized its multiplayer, which, according to her, lacked variety.

In Russia, the game won the Best Debut award at the Russian game developers conference KRI 2006.
