= Dohmen =

Dohmen is a surname. Notable people by that name include:

- Albert Dohmen (born 1956), German operatic bass-baritone
- Arnold Dohmen (1906–1980), German bacteriologist, physician in the Sachsenhausen concentration camp
- Bejo Dohmen (born 1984), German actor
- John-John Dohmen (born 1988), Belgian hockey player
- Peter Dohmen (1904–1977), German stained glass artist
- Rolf Dohmen (born 1952), German football coach
