= Zed Group =

Digital entertainment company based in Spain

- Company type: Private
- Industry: Digital entertainment
- Founded: 1996
- Headquarters: Madrid, Spain
- Key people: Javier Perez Dolset (CEO)
- Products: Products and services for mobile phones and Internet
- Brands: Zed
- Number of employees: 2,000 (50% dedicated to R&D + innovation)

Zed Group is a large organisation of privately held interlocking European companies that provide mobile phone and internet entertainment, film animation and video game production. Besides the main company also named Zed, other important companies of Zed Group are Ilion Animation Studios –production company specialized in computer-generated animation feature films like Planet 51- and Pyro Studios –video game developer including "Commandos".

Zed is a multiplatform digital entertainment company based in Spain that develops and markets entertainment and community products and services for all platforms. The company provides mobile phone value-added services (MVAS) services. Zed operates in 60 countries, including Europe's largest markets, United States, India and China and holds agreements with 170 wireless operators all over the world, reaching 500 million mobiles subscribers.

Zed is characterized for its development in services in the field of interactive leisure and entertainment, in mobile phones as well as the Internet. The range of products and services of Zed are 85% internally developed and available for the following platforms: Brew, Java, Symbian, Mac and Windows.

== History ==
The Perez Dolset family founded the company in Spain in 1996. The family launched the web portal LaNetro, whose objective was to offer interactive leisure and entertainment content accessible from any device with access to the internet.

In 2002, they decided to focus on value added services for mobile phones. Two years later, La Netro acquired a mobile phone content provider, Zed, from Nordic operator TeliaSonera. The company changed its name to LaNetro Zed and kept Zed as its brand for mobile content and services.

Four years later, in December 2006 Zed acquired Monstermob, one of its competitors based in the United Kingdom. That same year Zed acquired Alvento, a Spanish mobile phone services company.

In February 2007, Zed marketed the first web 2.0-based platform integrating mobile phones and web services. LaNetro Zed becomes Zed Worldwide. Later that year, Zed grossed $100 million in revenue in a single month. In the United States, Zed began to offer its content via RingToneJukeBox.com.

By early 2008 Zed Group established a joint venture with Grupo Planeta to manage the local guides LaNetro.com business. In addition, Zed acquired Netpeople in the Latin America.

In August 2008, Zed merged with two other companies founded by the Perez Dolset brothers, Pyro Studios (video game developer including Commandos) and Ilion Animation Studios (production company specialized in computer-generated animation of feature films).

Besides, Zed has announced an agreement with the NBA to expand the league's mobile phone offerings reaching basketball fans throughout North America, Europe and countries in Asia. Also, Zed has acquired Mobitween, a developer and publisher of Flash-based content for mobile and online environments.

In 2009, Zed acquired Player X, a British mobile media company specializing in Operators Portal Management, games and mobile TV & Video and Temafon, the exclusive content aggregator to one of the "big three" Russian operators Beeline which is closely associated with Amsterdam based VEON formerly PJSC VimpelCom. (Note: The "big three" mobile providers in Russia were MegaFon, Mobile TeleSystems (MTS) and Beeline now known as Amsterdam based VEON which was formerly PJSC VimpelCom.) During 2009 Zed also started operations in Brazil, and holds today operations in 60 countries. Another remarkable step for the group during 2009 corresponds to sister company Ilion Animation Studios, which premiered in November Planet 51, the highest-grossing Spanish movie globally in 2009.

In July 2015 Ilion Animation Studios signed a contract with Paramount Pictures to animate Wonder Park. The film is being produced on a budget of about 100 million euros, making it the largest budget to date for any movie produced in Spain. In 2019, Zed Group sued its primary investor for market manipulation, with the case dismissed in 2021.

== Products and services ==
The company provides mobile marketing solutions, consulting services and application development for companies and in the public sector, with these services under its business unit Zed Business Solutions.

In 2009, Zed started the Zed TV business unit. On the D2C segment, Zed owns a catalog of games for mobile phones and Internet.

in 2010 the company started a division named iZ, to apply the company's experience in videogames development to social media.

In November 2009 Zed launched Planet 51 Online, a massively multiplayer online game (MMO) available for desktops and laptops, based on the computer-generated animated movie Planet 51. The game allows players to an online virtual world populated by other film fans connected via the internet.

On 2013 Zed launched 24 Symbols a Spanish platform for E-books and digital entertainment.
