= Commandos: Origins =

2025 video game

- Developer: Claymore Game Studios
- Publisher: Kalypso Media
- Composers: Chris Wirtz; Alex Röder; Armin Haas; Dominik Morgenroth; Matthias Wolf; Henning Nugel
- Series: Commandos
- Platforms: PlayStation 5; Windows; Xbox Series X/S; Nintendo Switch 2
- Release: April 9, 2025; Nintendo Switch 2 December 15, 2026
- Genre: Real-time tactics
- Modes: Single-player, multiplayer

Commandos: Origins is a real-time tactics video game, developed by Claymore Game Studios and published by Kalypso Media for PlayStation 5, Xbox Series X/S, and Microsoft Windows. A fifth installment in the Commandos series, the game acts as a prequel to Commandos: Behind Enemy Lines (1998) by telling the story about the formation of the Commandos team, and their work during the war between 1940 and 1942.

The game was updated with better graphics, much larger maps, and new features, including one allowing players to plan and execute multiple actions simultaneously, with co-operative online play included for the game's campaign mode.

Commandos: Origins was released on April 9, 2025, where it received mixed reviews from critics, receiving praise for level design and multiple ways of completing objectives, but with questions over its gameplay mechanics.

== Gameplay ==
Commandos: Origins is a real-time tactics game played from a third person isometric perspective, in which players control an elite squad of specialists who are tasked in each mission to complete a set of objectives focused around sabotaging or eliminating key targets. The player controls an elite squad of specialists who are tasked with infiltrating military complexes to carry out their missions. Players must rely on using stealth tactics, avoiding enemy's cone of vision or eliminating them silently to progress. The game features six different classes: the Green Beret, the Sapper, the Sniper, the Driver, the Marine and the Spy, each of whom has their own unique abilities and gadgets. Maps in the game are large and sprawling, and provide players with multiple entry points to approach their objectives. Players can briefly pause the game, plan out the moves of several squad characters, and executing them simultaneously. Each map has multiple optional objectives for players to complete. The game features a two-player cooperative multiplayer mode.

== Plot ==
In June 1940, sapper Thomas Hancock is placed in charge of a new unit called the Commandos, and sent out to find recruits for his team. His search leads him to bringing in several talented individuals: Sergeant Jack O'Hara, an Irish strongman initially skeptical of his plans; Francis T. Woolridge, a British sniper of few words; James Blackwood, an Australian diver with a troubled past; and Samuel Brooklyn, an American heavy weapons specialist. The team conduct several operations across the Arctic north, Africa and Europe, sabotaging German war plans and operations to provide the Allies with an advantage.

During an operation in Norway to locate a resistance group, Blackwood and Woolridge encounter Rene Duchamp, a French spy skilled in deception and fluent in German. Although impressed by his assistance on their mission, Duchamp refuses to leave the country because of a personal mission he is on. Hancock later meets with him in January 1941, during a mission to sabotage weapons manufacturing, in which Duchamp reveals is mission involves eliminating a pair of officers from a secret German group known as Speerspitze, who are secretly advancing the German's war efforts.

After helping him eliminate his targets, Duchamp temporarily joins the team in hopes of finding the rest of the Speerspitze. Following further missions, including assisting in the Allied raid on Saint-Nazaire, Hancock receives word that O'Hara was captured by the Germans during a mission he was undertaking. Against the orders of their superiors, Hancock and the others lead a rescue operation to Zeitz, Germany. Without backup, the team rescue O'Hara, and in the process eliminate another officer of the Speerspitze.

Following the Zeitz mission, the team sabotage two major weapons projects in Norway and Germany, killing a fourth Speerspitze officer, before uncovering intel on the location of the group's leader. In January 1942, the team travels to the Speerspitze's castle headquarters within the Alps. Overcoming the tight security, the team assassinate him and several other Speerspitze whilst they are holding a conference over their recent setbacks. In the aftermath of the mission, Duchamp makes plans to return to France, but is convinced to finally join the Commandos, after Hancock proudly calls him a friend.

== Development ==
Commandos: Origins was developed by Claymore Game Studios, a studio founded by Kalypso Media's co-founder Simon Hellwig in 2020. The studio's primary goal was to revive the Commandos brand and modernize the franchise. The decision to avoid auto-saving in the game was intentional, as the team wanted to give the liberty for players to decide when they want to save and when to take risks. The game is a prequel, with its narrative focusing on how the six soldiers meet each other and become a team. The team was inspired by a number of films and documentaries, especially stories which involve a small but elite team turning the tide of an entire campaign or war. The Guns of Navarone (1961), The Dirty Dozen (1967), and Inglorious Basterds (2009) were cited by the team as sources of inspiration.

Kalypso Media acquired the rights to the Commandos franchise in July 2018 from Pyro Studios, who developed the first four games in the franchise. The game was announced in October 2023. It was released for Windows, PlayStation 5, and Xbox Series X and Series S on April 9, 2025. A port for Nintendo Switch 2 is set to release on December 15, 2026.

== Reception ==
Reception

Aggregate scores
Aggregator	Score
Metacritic	71/100
OpenCritic	51% recommend

Review scores
Publication	Score
Edge	7/10
Famitsu	30/40
IGN	8/10
PCGamesN	7/10
Shacknews	9/10

The game received "mixed or average reviews", according to review aggregator website Metacritic. In Japan, four critics from Famitsu gave the game a total score of 30 out of 40.

Luke Reilly from IGN felt that the game managed to strike "a great balance between the classic stealth tactics games and modern streamlined ideas", and added that maps and objectives in the game provided ample opportunities for creative eliminations, and players must plan their moves carefully in order to succeed. Sam Chandler from Shacknews called the game an "exceptional revival" of the franchise. He praised the levels in the game for their diversity and their sandbox-like design, adding that the game "does a tremendous job of never feeling tedious, despite how long it can take to finish a mission".

Ed Smith from PCGamesN wrote that the game was "meticulous, difficult, and demanding", calling it a "high-stakes, high-intensity RTS where even the smallest action can feel meaningful", but also felt that the game was "overdesigned", and that the "abundance of mechanics squeezes out improvisation or raw energy" of the premise. Edge praised the game for reimagining the franchise with modern visuals, though they felt that the game failed to push the genre forward with any new or innovative gameplay mechanic.
