= Kalypso Media =

German video game publisher

Kalypso Media Group GmbH
- Formerly: Kalypso Media GmbH (2006–2014)
- Type: Private
- Industry: Video games
- Founded: 16 August 2006; 20 years ago
- Founders: Simon Hellwig; Stefan Marcinek
- Headquarters: Worms, Rhineland-Palatinate, Germany
- Number of employees: 200 (2023)
- Website: kalypsomedia.com

Kalypso Media Group is a German video game developer and publisher. Founded in 2006 in Worms, the group comprises four companies in Germany, the United Kingdom and the United States and has studios, including Realmforge Studios, Gaming Minds Studios, Claymore Game Studios, and Nine Worlds Studios. Kalypso is best known for publishing Tropico, Sudden Strike, Dungeons and Railway Empire series.

== History ==
Kalypso Media was founded on 16 August 2006 by Simon Hellwig and Stefan Marcinek. One year later, a branch was opened in Bracknell, UK, and in June 2009, another in Ridgewood, USA. In 2009, the group opened its second UK outlet in the form of Kalypso Media Digital Ltd. in Leicester. Kalypso Media Digital Ltd. is responsible for the online marketing of its own games and the products of other providers.

In November 2008, it founded the subsidiary Realmforge Studios GmbH, based in Munich, and integrated Boxed Dreams, developer of Ceville. At the same time, it acquired the rights to the Tropico series from Take Two Interactive, with the first Kalypso-published game in the series being Tropico 3.

UK-based Ascaron filed for bankruptcy in April 2009. Kalypso was able to acquire rights to its series DarkStar One, Patrician and Port Royale in June 2009, though left other assets like the Sacred series with Ascaron. Kalypso also acquired fifteen former Ascaron employees to establish its second internal studio, Gaming Minds Studio, in Gütersloh, of which it held 60% ownership, the other 40% owned by Daniel Dumont and Kay Struve, former Ascaron employees that were named to run Gaming Minds.

In July 2010, Berlin manufacturer The Games Company (TGC) filed for bankruptcy and in September, Kalypso took over, acquiring several brands owned by the insolvent company. Kalypso also brought in TGC's internal studio Silver Style Entertainment and created a third internal studio, Noumena Studios in Berlin. The studio was rebranded as Skilltree Studios in 2014, but in March 2016, Kalypso opted to close the studio.

Kalypso founded a sister company for mobile gaming development, Kalypso Media Mobile, in April 2014 in Berlin. The studio’s first mobile and tablet games were released a year later in May 2015.

In January 2016, Stefan Marcinek sold his shares in the Kalypso and left the company, leaving Simon Hellwig as sole shareholder.

Kalypso acquired the Commandos, Imperial Glory, and Praetorians series from Pyro Studios in July 2018. Pyro, whose work has been more focused on supporting Ilion Animation Studios, welcomed Kalypso's opportunity to bring its titles back to the market. Kalypso later announced high-definition remasters of Commandos 2 and Praetorians for early 2020, and the formation of its third internal studio, Claymore Game Studios, to develop new games in the Commandos series. The company fully acquired the remaining ownership of Gaming Minds from Dumont and Struve in June 2020, with Dumont and Struve still remaining as the studio leads.

In October 2021, it announced a new studio in Munich called Nine Worlds Studios, which is named after the nine worlds of Norse mythology. They will be responsible for creating a new Tropico entry. Project Manager Thomas Schneider, formerly of Aesir Interactive, was hired to lead in setting up the studio.

On 18 October 2022 Kalypso announced that co-founder Simon Hellwig had died.

== Subsidiaries ==
Kalypso has several development studios:

- Realmforge Studios was established in Munich in November 2008, incorporating the team of Boxed Dreams who had developed Ceville. Realmforge oversees development on the series Dungeons and (since December 2020) Tropico
- Gaming Minds Studios was established in Gütersloh in June 2009, following the bankruptcy of Ascaron, incorporating fifteen Ascaron developers into the team. Gaming Minds develops games in the Railway Empire and Port Royale series.
- Claymore Game Studios was established in Darmstadt in December 2019, and worked on Commandos: Origins.
- Nine Worlds Studios was established in Munich in October 2021, with Thomas Schneider, formerly of Aesir Interactive, hired as project manager. They would begin work on Tropico 7.

=== Closed ===
- In September 2010, Kalypso brought in The Games Company's (TGC) internal studio Silver Style Entertainment after TGC closed down in July 2010, and created a third internal studio, Noumena Studios in Berlin. The studio was rebranded as Skilltree Studios in 2014, but in March 2016, Kalypso opted to close the studio.

== Games published ==
Release date	Title	Developer(s)
2007	Theatre of War	1C Company
2007	Star Assault	GamesArk
2007	Campus	
2007	Hollywood Pictures 2	Sayonara Software
2007	Jack Keane	Deck13 Interactive
2008	Racing Team Manager	destraX Entertainment
2008	Political Machine 2008	Stardock
2008	Imperium Romanum	Haemimont Games
2008	AGON - The Lost Sword of Toledo	Private Moon Studios
2008	Winter Challenge 2008	
2009	Grand Ages: Rome	Haemimont Games
2009	Ceville	Realmforge Studios
2009	Dawn of Magic 2	SkyFallen Entertainment
2009	Time of Shadows	SkyFallen Entertainment
2009	Tropico 3	Haemimont Games
2010	M.U.D. TV	Realmforge Studios
2010	Darkfall	Aventurine SA
2010	Patrician IV: Conquest by Trade	Gaming Minds
2010	DarkStar One: Broken Alliance (Xbox 360)	Ascaron
2010	Pole Position 2010	destraX Entertainment
2010	Disciples III	.dat media
2011	Who's That Flying?!	Mediatonic
2011	Dungeons	Realmforge Studios
2011	Elements of War	Lesta Studio
2011	The First Templar	Haemimont Games
2011	Patrician IV: Rise of a Dynasty	Gaming Minds
2011	Revolution Under Siege	SEP Reds
2011	Boulder Dash-XL	Catnip Games
2011	Tropico 4	Haemimont Games
2011	Air Conflicts: Secret Wars	Games Farm
2011	Airline Tycoon II	B-Alive
2011	Global Ops: Commando Libya	Spectral Games
2012	Jagged Alliance: Back in Action	Coreplay
2012	Jurassic Park: The Game	Telltale Games
2012	Port Royale 3	Gaming Minds
2012	Hard Reset: Extended Edition	Flying Wild Hog
2012	Legends of Pegasus	NovaCore Studios
2012	Sine Mora	Digital Reality
2012	Anna	Dreampainters Software
2013	Omerta - City of Gangsters	Haemimont Games
2013	Dollar Dash	Candygun Games
2013	Alien Spidey	Enigma Software
2013	Rise of Venice	Gaming Minds
2013	Dark	Realmforge Studios
2014	Tropico 5	Haemimont Games
2015	Dungeons 2	Realmforge Studios
2015	Grand Ages: Medieval	Gaming Minds
2015	Crookz: The Big Heist	Skilltree Studios
2017	Urban Empire	Reborn Games
2017	Sudden Strike 4	Kite Games
2017	Vikings: Wolves of Midgard	Games Farm
2017	Dungeons 3	Realmforge Studios
2018	Railway Empire	Gaming Minds
2018	Shadows: Awakening	Games Farm
2019	Tropico 6	Limbic Entertainment
2020	Praetorians - HD Remaster	Torus Games
2020	Commandos 2 - HD Remaster	Yippee! Entertainment
2020	Immortal Realms: Vampire Wars	Palindrome Interactive
2020	Port Royale 4	Gaming Minds
2021	Spacebase Startopia	Realmforge Studios
2021	Disciples: Liberation	Frima Studio
2022	Commandos 3 - HD Remaster	Raylight Games
2022	Matchpoint: Tennis Championships	Kalypso Media
2023	Tortuga: A Pirate's Tale	Gaming Minds
2023	Railway Empire 2	Gaming Minds
2023	Dungeons 4	Realmforge Studios
2024	The Inquisitor	The Dust
2025	Commandos: Origins	Claymore Game Studios
2026	Sudden Strike 5	Kite Games
2026	Disciples: Domination	Artefacts Studio
2027	Tropico 7	Gaming Minds
2027	Rise of the Spellbaker	Realmforge Studios
