= Railway Empire =

2018 video game

- Developer: Gaming Minds Studios (Note: Nintendo Switch version ported by Independent Arts Software)
- Publisher: Kalypso Media
- Artists: Bruno Frasca, Daniel Lieske
- Platforms: Microsoft Windows; Linux; PlayStation 4; Xbox One; Nintendo Switch
- Release: Windows, Linux, PS4, Xbox One: EU: January 26, 2018; NA: January 30, 2018; Nintendo Switch: JP: February 14, 2020; WW: June 19, 2020
- Genre: Construction and management simulation
- Mode: Single-player

Railway Empire is a railroad construction and management simulation game developed by Gaming Minds Studio and published by Kalypso Media. It was announced in early 2017 and released on 26 January 2018 for Linux and Microsoft Windows, 30 January 2018 for PlayStation 4 and Xbox One, and 14 February 2020 for Nintendo Switch. In Japan, the physical copy of the game was distributed by Ubisoft in May 2018. A sequel, Railway Empire 2, was released in 2023.

== Gameplay ==
Railway Empire's base game takes place in the United States from 1830 to 1930. The player can build a large network of railway lines and buy various locomotives to serve cities and industries - growing cities in the process, and hire railway personnel for both train operations and office positions, all with individual bonuses and personality types. The player can also unlock innovations such as new locomotives or bonuses to revenue. The game has five main game modes: campaign mode, scenario mode, free mode, sandbox mode and challenge mode.

The Campaign mode mainly takes the player through the building of the First transcontinental railroad, the exception being mission four which is based around the American Civil War. In this mode, the player must fulfil tasks as well as competing with AI controlled competitors. In the Scenario mode, these competitors are selectable and playable characters with specific gameplay bonuses. The tasks are also considerably harder in scenario mode. In Free mode, the task list is randomly generated upon start-up, and the tasks given are not compulsory. Players can also choose to toggle different settings, such as how many competitors they face (between 0 and 3), the competitors' difficulty level, or whether snowfall is enabled (thereby slowing down locomotives in winter months). Sandbox mode has no tasks and all locomotives are automatically researched. There are also no competitors and money is infinite. Challenge mode is similar to scenarios and free mode but players compete with other players on an online leaderboard.

== Release ==
=== Expansions ===
As of 7 May 2021, the game has ten downloadable content (DLC) available. Most DLCs add new Scenarios to the game, new maps for Free Game and Sandbox mode, new engines and tradeable goods. One DLC, Railway Empire - Official Soundtrack, does not add to the base game and instead is the release of the soundtracks of the base game and the DLCs released at that time.

Name	Release date	Ref.
Mexico	8 June 2018	
The Great Lakes	17 August 2018	
Crossing the Andes	19 October 2018	
Great Britain & Ireland	14 December 2018	
Germany	1 March 2019	
France	24 May 2019	
Northern Europe	13 December 2019	
Down Under	8 May 2020	
Japan (Note: This DLC was released after the publication of the 'Complete Collection' and 'Official Soundtrack' items and is not included on either.)	7 May 2021	

=== Editions ===
On 7 August 2020, Kalypso released the 'complete collection', allowing for the purchase of all DLCs available at that time (except the music DLC) together with the base game.

== Reception ==
Reception

Aggregate score
Aggregator	Score
Metacritic	PC: 74/100; PS4: 79/100; XONE: 77/100; NS: 74/100

The game has a score of 74 on Metacritic.

In a review of Railway Empire in Black Gate, Bob Byrne said "I've rediscovered my love of railroad simulations with this game. It's just as fun to play as Railroad Tycoon was. I highly recommend this if it's your type of game."

=== Awards and nominations ===
Railway Empire was nominated for four awards by the Deutscher Entwicklerpreis 2018; it won two: Best German PC/Console Game, and Best German Technical Performance Game.
