= Legends of Pegasus =

2012 video game

- Legends of Pegasus cover art
- Developer: NovaCore Studios
- Publisher: Kalypso Media
- Engine: (12 September 2012)
- Platform: Microsoft Windows
- Release: 10 August 2012
- Genres: 4X, Real-time strategy, Turn-based strategy
- Modes: Single-player, Multiplayer

Legends of Pegasus is a turn-based, real-time strategy 4X game developed by now defunct German company NovaCore Studios, and published by Kalypso Media.

== Plot ==
In 2281, .... discovered a new spaceship engine so they could explore the universe. Humanity built spaceships, colonized faraway worlds and started terraforming others in order to settle on planets like Earth. While exploring the universe, Humanity came together to unite. But soon enough, Man's warlike nature got the better of Humanity, again. Independence ripped apart Humanities unity, it led the colonies to rebel against the government ruling Earth. Humanity was on the brink of war.

As the situation became out of control, an unknown race appeared. The aliens shared their technological knowledge with Humanity and brought the civil war to an end. Mankind finally accepted this alliance, and allowed the aliens to roam freely in their space. Mankind thought they must be looking for something.

Inevitably, this strange new race stopped sharing their knowledge and started regrouping their spaceships. And these aliens had started attacking Mankind, Humanity were taken completely by surprise. Humanity's entire fleet was called back to Earth, to try to defend their homeworld and put an end to the attack, but the enemy was too strong. In the middle of the fight between Humanity and the aliens, a worm hole suddenly opened and swallowed several Human ships. The ships ended up stranded in an unknown and unexplored galaxy.

== Reception ==
Reception

Aggregate scores
Aggregator	Score
GameRankings	37.00% (6 reviews)
Metacritic	36/100 (11 reviews)

Review scores
Publication	Score
GameSpot	4.0/10
GameSpy	1/5
IGN	2.7/10 (3 reviews)

The game received very negative scores for the amount of bugs it had on release along with missing content. It currently holds an average score of 36 on Metacritic, based on 11 reviews. In late October 2012, the developer Novacore filed for bankruptcy, which cancelled any future content for the game, such as DLC, fixes and patches.
