= Anna (video game) =

2012 video game

- Developer: Dreampainters Software
- Publisher: Kalypso Media
- Engine: Unity
- Platforms: Microsoft Windows, Mac OS X, Linux, Xbox 360, PlayStation 3
- Release: 11 July 2012: Anna Windows; NA: 11 July 2012 (Desura); EU: 16 July 2012 (Online); WW: 21 September 2012 (Steam) OS X 9 November 2012 (Steam) Extended Edition Windows, OS X & Linux 7 February 2013 2 April 2013 (Steam) Xbox 360; NA: 23 September 2014; EU: 26 September 2014 PlayStation 3; NA: 31 March 2015; PAL: 1 April 2015
- Genre: Adventure game
- Mode: Single-player

Anna is a 2012 psychological horror adventure video game developed by Dreampainters Software.

Set high in the Italian mountains, Anna follows an unnamed protagonist as he uncovers his past and mysterious connection to the eponymous Anna. Players must contend with the protagonist's dwindling sanity and environments that shift in appearance. Depending on the player's actions, multiple endings are possible.

On 13 April 2013, the Extended Edition was released which added new environments, puzzles, a user interface, music, improved graphics, and a new character.

== Plot ==
The story in Anna is significantly changed in the Extended Edition. The following applies to that version of the game.

Anna concerns an unnamed protagonist who, after a series of dreams centered around a sawmill nestled somewhere in the Italian mountains, finds an envelope containing photographs of him being in the Val D'Ayas Valley, a location he has no recollection of visiting. As his mental state declines, he collapses while giving a lecture on history. Following a short stay in a nearby hospital, a visiting colleague accidentally forces him to open the envelope. Contained within the envelope are pictures of the sawmill haunting the protagonist's dreams. Silently vowing his love to a figure known only as Anna, he sets out in search of the sawmill.

Arriving, the protagonist is met by a locked door he has to force open by operating a mechanism with two halves of a rusty cogwheel. Upon entering, he is met by various supernatural entities haunting the house, including apparitions of a crying woman, which follows him as he progresses. A backstory is revealed through documents found within the sawmill, puzzles, and observations made by the player: the eponymous Anna was a god worshiped long ago, signifying growth and nature. After a woman said to resemble Anna was accused of witchcraft and burned alive, Anna grew furious at men. Throughout generations, men found and fell madly in love with her, their devotion causing them to self-destruct. One of these men, a sabot maker, discovered the cult that surrounded her through research and, after quickly realizing the house he shared with his brother was built on a long-lost temple, began a ritual to summon her. A vain attempt to cut the sabot maker's obsession short by his brother failed, resulting in him succumbing to an uncertain fate. Many years later, the protagonist rented the sawmill out for a summer vacation with his family. It's implied that those in charge of the lease are related to the sabot maker and aware of his past; the lower levels of the sawmill were made inaccessible per the lease. While on a stroll, the protagonist discovers Anna, thus kicking his obsession into full force and resulting in the theft of a statue made in her likeness by a sculptor who found Anna centuries ago. Fearing for her husband's health and commitment, his wife smashes the statue, causing the protagonist to snap and murder his family. Appalled by the unspeakable horror, Anna kicks the protagonist out of the house and wipes his memory.

Depending on the player's actions throughout the game, the protagonist will either: leave the sawmill before or after being cursed by going too far in, be overcome by his dwindling sanity and find himself expelled from the house, be told to leave before entering the temple due to a lack of knowledge; be overcome by his obsession and find himself permanently trapped in the temple with Anna's statue, glad that she is with him; or endure the sabot maker's fate by following in his footsteps. If the player decides to go with the latter, the protagonist's consciousness will be trapped in one of the many wooden mannequins found within the sawmill. A post-credits scene is unlocked if the player finds every observation, uncovering a fresco of Anna next to the Zoroastrian spirit of destruction, Angra Mainyu (whose connection to Anna is ambiguously hinted at throughout the game) previously hidden behind a locked cabinet.

== Development ==
Dreampainters, the development studio, based the story on legends from the Val D'Ayas region of Italy, particularly one about a sawmill where a lumberjack killed his family. They claimed that the game's focus was on mystery-solving and exploration, with the player being able to discover the plot at their own pace. One of Anna's particularly infamous features, the ability to pick up any object (no matter if it will be used later on in the game), was apparently based on the developers' hatred for adventure games and cartoons where the important objects were made more obvious to the viewer.

Anna would reportedly have a feature whereby the game would interpret the player's actions to try and scare them; for example, if a player focused on a particular object for too long, that object would appear more often. However, no such feature appeared in the game. Dreampainters also claimed that the extent of the protagonist's descent into madness would determine the ending, but the ending was actually determined by when the player decided to leave the sawmill.

== Reception ==
Reception

Aggregate score
Aggregator	Score
Metacritic	PC: 55/100; PC (Extended Edition): 75/100

Review scores
Publication	Score
Adventure Gamers	2/5
Destructoid	3.1/10
IGN	5.5/10
VideoGamer.com	5/10

Anna received "Mixed or average reviews," according to Metacritic. The graphics, story and sound were praised, but it was criticized for the obscurity of its narrative, complexity of its interface, poor translation, and difficulty of its puzzles. The horror elements were both praised and criticized by different reviews; IGN's Anthony Gallegos initially praised the horror aspects but lamented that "most of the fear factor is neutered after you realize nothing can harm you." Destructoid's Holly Green praised the atmosphere, but claimed "the pre-release screenshots feel a bit misleading." VideoGamer's Lewis Denby liked the "genuine scares here and there," but felt similarly to Gallego about the lack of challenge. The puzzles met a far more divisive reaction. Denby thought that "Most of the puzzles don't make any sense," while Gallegos confided that many of the puzzles were "anger-inducing," describing them as "really just trial and error situations." Green noted that the lack of hints turned the puzzle-solving into "a game of pin the tail on the donkey," but noted that the interface helped reduce the frustration of pixel-hunting. Web-reviewer Yahtzee Croshaw praised the horror but claimed the immersion was broken by the necessity of a walkthrough. Both Green and Denby agreed that the quality of the translation was poor; Denby felt that the translation was "garbled." Green declared "the translation's biggest casualty is the narrative behind the protagonist's obsession with Anna." All three critics agreed that the User Interface was unpolished. Gallegos felt that it was "sub-par," and both Denby and Green found it to be an area of frustration.

== Sequel ==
A sequel, White Heaven, was announced in 2013 with a projected release date of 2014. An indirect sequel, White Heaven was set to expand the scope of the narrative and gameplay capabilities found within Anna. Development on the title resurfaced with an announcement trailer in 2016.

In 2020, another sequel, Nascence, was revealed. Set to be the first in a trilogy titled Anna's Songs, it tells a standalone story set within the universe of Anna. In a developer Q&A, it was announced that White Heaven is now a part of this new trilogy and development on the title will continue development soon after the release of Nascence. A newly formed development studio, Treehouse Studios, is assisting with development.
