= Dollar Dash =

2013 video game

- Cover art on the Xbox Live Marketplace
- Developer: Candygun Games
- Publisher: Kalypso Media
- Directors: Roger Joswig; Jens Jankuhn
- Producer: Andrew R. McKerrow
- Engine: Unreal Engine 3
- Platforms: Xbox 360 (XBLA); PlayStation 3 Windows macOS
- Release: Xbox 360: WW: March 6, 2013; PlayStation 3: NA: March 19, 2013; EU: March 20, 2013; Windows and macOS; Steam: WW: March 6, 2013; Desura: WW: February 5, 2014
- Genre: Action
- Modes: Single-player, Multiplayer

Dollar Dash is an action video game developed by German studio Candygun Games and published by Kalypso Media. It was released on March 6, 2013 (worldwide) for the Xbox 360, on March 19, 2013 in North America and March 20, 2013 in Europe and Australia for the PlayStation 3. The game was also released for Windows and macOS on March 6, 2013 via Steam and on February 5, 2014 via Desura.

== Gameplay ==
The game can be played with up to four players (local or online) and features three different game modes: Dollar Dash, Hit 'n' Run, and Save the Safe.

In Dollar Dash mode, players race around a top-down map collecting cash while trying to avoid other players and obstacles. Players can use power-ups to attack, defend themselves, or outrun their opponents. At set intervals, players can drop off the cash they've collected with a van to score points. The game ends when one player has reached a certain number of points or when the time runs out.

A screenshot from the game, from the Dollar Dash mode

In Hit 'n' Run mode, players must collect as much cash as possible while driving a car. Players can use power-ups to attack other players, slow them down, or boost their own speed. The game ends when one player has reached a certain number of points or when the time runs out.

In Save the Safe mode, one player is designated as the banker and must protect the safe while the other players try to steal it. The banker can use power-ups to defend the safe, while the other players can use power-ups to attack the safe or the banker. The game ends when the safe is stolen or when the time runs out.

=== Downloadable content ===
The More Ways to Win DLC pack includes a new game mode called Topscorer. This mode features six maps and new in-game shop content, including costumes, victory dances, and icons. In Topscorer, each player carries a money bag that can hold up to $1,000. The Robber's Toolkit DLC pack includes new weapons, upgrades, and shop items.

The Winter Pack includes five Christmas-themed maps and a variety of festive shop items. Players can equip their character with a Santa hat, Santa beard, and other items as they collect presents instead of dollars. The Summer Pack includes four summer-themed maps and a variety of beach-themed shop items. Players can equip their character with a Hawaiian shirt, sunglasses, and other items as they collect seashells instead of dollars.

== Reception ==
Reception

Aggregate score
Aggregator	Score		
Aggregator	PC	PS3	Xbox 360
Metacritic	48/100	55/100	49/100

Review scores
Publication	Score		
Publication	PC	PS3	Xbox 360
4Players	51%	N/A	51%
Destructoid	6/10	6/10	6/10
Electronic Gaming Monthly	N/A	N/A	5/10
Game Informer	N/A	N/A	6/10
GamesMaster	N/A	N/A	2.6/10
IGN	4.8/10	4.8/10	4.8/10
PlayStation Official Magazine – UK	N/A	5.5/10	N/A
Official Xbox Magazine (UK)	N/A	N/A	4/10
Official Xbox Magazine (US)	N/A	N/A	4/10
VentureBeat	51/100	51/100	51/100

Dollar Dash received "generally unfavorable" reviews according to review aggregator Metacritic.

Chris Carter at Destructoid stated that "If you're not a mega-fan of the genre though, it's probably best to keep your dollars in your wallet."

Kyle Hilliard at Game Informer stated that "Dollar Dash is a simple experience with only three modes. Each level is unique, but the combat feels shallow. Fun can be had in the chaos, making it decent to pick up and play for a few matches, but it lacks lasting appeal…unless you're really into novelty customization items like afro wigs and aviator sunglasses." GamesMaster gave Dollar Dash a "yawn" in their magazine.

Taylor Cocke at IGN stated that "There isn't a whole lot to Dollar Dash. It's a simple game about running around, grabbing stuff, and throwing things at friends, and it goes totally overboard with it. With no significant depth or cleverness to it, it's easy for the annoying gameplay imbalances and control issues to ruin the whole thing."
