= Dawn of Magic 2 =

2009 video game

Dawn of Magic 2 (EU) Time of Shadows (NA)
- Developer: SkyFallen Entertainment
- Publishers: RU: 1C Company; EU: Kalypso Media; NA: Take-Two Interactive
- Platform: Windows
- Release: RU: 24 November 2006; NA: 8 September 2009; EU: 11 September 2009
- Genre: Action role-playing
- Mode: Single-player

Dawn of Magic 2, known in Russia as Blood Magic: Time of Shadows (Russian: Магия крови: Время теней) and in North America as Time of Shadows, is an action role-playing game for Microsoft Windows published by 1C Publishing. Released on 11 September 2009, it is the sequel to the 2007 game Dawn of Magic and was developed by SkyFallen Entertainment.

Set 10 years after its predecessor, Dawn of Magic 2 features over 100 spells, comprehensive role-playing elements, and a balanced wizardry system.

== Reception ==
GirlGamersUK.com gave the game a score of 5/10.
