= Planet 51 =

2009 film by Jorge Blanco

- Canadian theatrical release poster
- Directed by: Jorge Blanco
- Screenplay by: Joe Stillman
- Story by: Javier Abad; Jorge Blanco; Marcos Martínez; Ignacio Pérez Dolset
- Produced by: Ignacio Pérez Dolset; Guy Colins
- Starring: Dwayne Johnson; Jessica Biel; Justin Long; Gary Oldman; Seann William Scott; John Cleese
- Edited by: Alex Rodríguez
- Music by: James Brett
- Production companies: Ilion Animation Studios; HandMade Films International
- Distributed by: DeAPlaneta Distribución (Spain); Entertainment Film Distributors (United Kingdom); TriStar Pictures (through Sony Pictures Releasing; United States)
- Release dates: 14 November 2009 (Westwood); 20 November 2009 (North America); 27 November 2009 (Spain); 4 December 2009 (United Kingdom)
- Running time: 91 minutes
- Countries: Spain; United Kingdom; United States
- Languages: English; Spanish
- Budget: €49 million (US$70 million)
- Box office: $105.6 million

Planet 51 is a 2009 animated science fiction comedy film directed by Jorge Blanco from a script by Joe Stillman, and starring the voices of Dwayne Johnson, Justin Long, Jessica Biel, Gary Oldman, Seann William Scott, John Cleese and Freddie Benedict. An inversion of classic alien invasion and first contact premises, the film follows a human astronaut who lands on an alien planet and is hunted as an "invader", while one of the aliens and his friends try to help him return home.

An international co-production between Spain, the United Kingdom, and the United States, the film was originally acquired for North American distribution by New Line Cinema, but then sold to Sony Pictures before completion. Originally titled Planet One, and later named as an allusion to Area 51, the film was completed on a $70 million budget, which, at the time of its release, was the most expensive film produced in Spain.

Planet 51 was released on 20 November 2009 in the United States and Canada by Sony Pictures Releasing's TriStar Pictures and Remstar Media Partners respectively; 27 November in Spain by DeAPlaneta Distribución; and 4 December in the United Kingdom by HandMade Films International. While the film was well-received in Spain, winning a Goya Award for Best Animated Film, it was a critical failure in the United States. The film grossed $105.6 million worldwide.

== Plot ==
On Planet 51, (Note: The name of the planet is never mentioned in the film; only the title suggests what it's called.) green extraterrestrials live peacefully in Glipforg, a town reminiscent of the United States during the 1950s. One day, a mysterious spacecraft lands in town, carrying NASA astronaut Captain Charles T. "Chuck" Baker, who is shocked to discover the planet is inhabited. Chuck escapes to the town's planetarium, where he meets a teenage alien named Lem, who is employed there.

Chuck convinces Lem to help return him to his spacecraft before the command module, Odyssey, departs for Earth in three days. Meanwhile, General Grawl, the paranoid commander of Planet 51's military, deduces that the astronaut is an alien invader bent on turning the population into zombies, and a manhunt ensues.

Lem enlists the help of his best friend, Skiff, to hide Chuck. During his efforts to conceal Chuck, Lem inadvertently upsets Neera, his neighbor and crush, who believes the astronaut is friendly, and is also fired from his job when his supervisor discovers Chuck. Chuck reunites with a dog-like NASA probe called Rover, which freed itself from the army's base and begins to bond with Skiff. At the comic book store Skiff works at, the news captures Chuck acting out references to Earth's pop culture, which is misinterpreted as alien threats. Grawl has Chuck's spacecraft moved to a secret location to be dismantled and studied.

During a festive movie premiere in town, Chuck is discovered and captured by Grawl's forces. When Lem tries to defend Chuck, alien scientist Professor Kipple deems him a zombie minion. Resigned to his fate, Chuck pretends to release Lem from his "mind control" and is taken away to the army's secret headquarters, Base 9, to have his brain removed. Lem gets his job back but is determined to rescue Chuck. Joined by Skiff, Neera, her younger brother Eckle, and Rover, Lem tracks down Base 9's location in a desert neighboring Glipforg.

After saving Chuck from Kipple's operation, the group locates Chuck's spacecraft in a hanger, where they are cornered by Grawl and his forces. Bent on eliminating the human, Grawl reveals he has the base rigged to explode. Lem attempts to reason with Grawl but activates the countdown. An enraged Grawl attempts to shoot Lem but he ignites an explosive, causing him to be trapped under debris. Chuck rescues Grawl before manually flying his spacecraft into Planet 51's orbit, escaping Base 9's destruction.

While admiring Planet 51's view from space, Lem asks Neera out on a date and they share a kiss, while a redeemed Grawl thanks Chuck for saving him. Chuck returns the aliens to Glipforg, allows Rover to stay on Planet 51 with Skiff, and bids Lem and the town farewell before departing for Earth.

== Voice cast ==
- Dwayne Johnson as Captain Charles T. "Chuck" Baker, a human NASA astronaut.
- Justin Long as Lem Korplog, a teenage boy living in Glipforg on Planet 51.
  - Long also voices Rover, a dog-like robotic vehicle probe that studies the planet (mostly rocks).
- Jessica Biel as Neera, a teenage girl, Eckle's older sister, and Lem's love interest.
- Gary Oldman as General Grawl of Planet 51's military, who fears an alien invasion.
- Seann William Scott as Skiff, Lem's best friend who works at a comic-book store.
- Freddie Benedict as Eckle, Neera's younger brother.
- John Cleese as Professor Kipple, a scientist and Grawl's right-hand man.
- Mathew Horne as Soldier Vesklin, a gullible soldier.
- James Corden as Soldier Vernkot, another gullible soldier.
- Alan Marriott as Glar, a ukulele-playing hippie.
- Rupert Degas as Chief Gorlock, a police officer.
- Vincent Marzello as Lem's dad.

Additional voices are provided by Lewis MacLeod, Emma Tate, Rupert Degas, Pete Atkin, Rebecca Front, Laurence Bouvard, Vincent Marzello and Brian Bowles.

== Production ==
Planet 51 is based on an original idea by Jorge Blanco, Marcos Martínez, Ignacio Pérez Dolset and Javier Abad. The film finished production by June 2009.

The name change from Planet One to Planet 51 was a result of the demands made from another entity branded "Planet One" which produces children and teen TV programmes. They made contact with the film's producers early on to resolve the trademark and brand confusion issues. The Spanish film company behind it, Ilion Animation Studios, made an offer to the existing entity for all ownership rights to their "Planet One" trademarks and related website URLs. Planet One chose not to take that offer and to protect their brand and trademarks that had been active for many years. As a result, the film's producers chose to rename the film "Planet 51", a reference to the United States Air Force facility Area 51, where conspiracy theorists claim that data and specimens from extraterrestrials are stored.

The character of Lem was named by screenwriter Joe Stillman after Polish science-fiction writer Stanisław Lem. Since the film was intended to be a parody of American pulp science fiction shot in Eastern Europe, Stillman thought it would be hilarious to have the name hint about a writer whose works have nothing to do with "little green men" stereotypes.

== Release ==
In November 2007, New Line Cinema had picked up the American distribution rights from HandMade; the studio itself was to release the film in the summer of 2009. However, TriStar Pictures became the film's home after New Line Cinema sold the rights to them through Sony Pictures Worldwide Acquisitions Group. According to the Variety magazine, New Line Cinema's owner, Warner, "decided to let the pic go after the producers insisted on a November release, when Warner is releasing its sixth Harry Potter pic." The new distributor moved the U.S. release date from the summer of 2009 to November of that year. A 3D version of the movie was planned but was scrapped.

=== Home media ===
The film was released by Sony Pictures Home Entertainment on Blu-ray and DVD in the United States on 9 March 2010; it would also see various other re-releases alongside other animated and/or family films by Sony Pictures afterwards, including as part of a triple pack with Surf's Up and The Pirates!: Band of Misfits.

== Reception ==
=== Box office ===
The film was released in 3,035 cinemas, grossing $3.2 million on its opening day and $12.6 million over the weekend, resulting in the number four position at the box office behind 2012, The Blind Side and The Twilight Saga: New Moon respectively. During its theatrical run, it made over $42 million, with a total of $105 million worldwide.

=== Critical response ===
On the review aggregator website Rotten Tomatoes, 23% of 110 critics' reviews are positive, with an average rating of 4.2/10. The website's consensus reads: "Planet 51 squanders an interesting premise with an overly familiar storyline, stock characters, and humor that alternates between curious and potentially offensive." Metacritic, gave it a score of 39, indicating "generally unfavorable reviews", based on 21 reviews. Audiences polled by CinemaScore gave the film an average grade of "B+" on an A+ to F scale.

Adam Markovitz of Entertainment Weekly graded the film a B, as it "delivers a few pleasant surprises, including a smart story". Roger Ebert of the Chicago Sun-Times gave 2 1/2 stars out of 4 and positively wrote of the film being "perfectly pleasant as kiddie entertainment, although wall-to-wall with pop references to the American 1950s." Furthermore, some critics such as Markovitz of EW, Steven Rea of The Philadelphia Inquirer, and Brian Miller of The Village Voice acknowledged Planet 51 as "an E.T. in reverse" (a role reversal where the human is the "alien").

=== Accolades ===
Award	Category	Nominee	Result
Artios Award	Outstanding Achievement in Casting - Animation Feature	Ruth Lambert and Robert McGee	Nominated
Cinema Writers Circle Awards	Best New Artist	Jorge Blanco	Won
European Film Awards	Best Animated Feature Film	Jorge Blanco, Javier Abad and Marcos Martínez	Nominated
Goya Awards	Best Animated Film		Won
Goya Awards	Best Original Song	Tom Cawte for the song "Stick It to the Man"	Nominated

== Soundtrack ==
Planet 51

Soundtrack album
- Released: 10 November 2009 (digital); 17 November 2009 (CD)
- Length: 42:54
- Label: Decca Label Group

The soundtrack album for the film was released by Decca Label Group on 10 November 2009 (digital) and 17 November 2009 (CD).

No.	Title	Artist(s)	Length
1.	"Lollipop"	Sophie Green	2:30
2.	"Long Tall Sally"	John Sloman	2:10
3.	"Tried To Save the World"	Tom Cawte	3:49
4.	"Ding Ding a Boom Boom"	Keith Murrell	2:25
5.	"Gonna Be a Star"	Tom Cawte	3:35
6.	"Be Bop a Lula"	Chris Cawte	3:01
7.	"Greased Lightnin'"	Lance Ellington	3:10
8.	"Unchained Melody"	Keith Murrell	3:37
9.	"Mr. Sandman"	Peter Gosling	2:30
10.	"Stick It to the Man"	Tom Cawte	3:29
11.	"Space Oddity"	Keith Murrell	5:19
12.	"Planet 51 Orchestral Suite"	London Metropolitan Orchestra	7:19
Total length:			42:54

== Video games ==
A video game based on the film was announced in November 2009. The game, an action-driving game, was published by Sega and was released on Nintendo DS, PlayStation 3, Wii, and Xbox 360 on 17 November 2009. Pyro Studios developed the console version and Firebrand Games developed the Nintendo DS version. Zed Group, a long-time customer of Trinigy's, worked on the online version of the game with the Vision Engine. There are also Planet 51 games for iPhone, mobile devices and Facebook, developed by Zed Worldwide.
