= Commando 3 =

Commando 3 may refer to:

- Wolf of the Battlefield: Commando 3, a 2008 video game
- Commando 3 (film), a 2019 Indian film by Aditya Datt, third installment in the Commando film series

== See also ==
- Commandos 3: Destination Berlin, a 2003 video game
