= Immortal Realms: Vampire Wars =

2020 video game

- Developer: Palindrome Interactive
- Publisher: Kalypso Media
- Engine: Unity
- Platforms: Nintendo Switch; PlayStation 4; Windows; Xbox One
- Release: WW: August 28, 2020
- Genre: Turn-based strategy
- Mode: Single-player

Immortal Realms: Vampire Wars is a 2020 turn-based strategy video game developed by Palindrome Interactive and published by Kalypso Media.

== Gameplay ==
Vampires take over the world of Nemire and divide it into three empires. Players control one of the vampire factions as they attempt to wipe out the others. It is a turn-based strategy game in which players manage their kingdom, build units, research technologies, and move around on a world map. Each faction has unique special abilities that are represented by digital cards, which can be collected to form combos. When they encounter an enemy unit, players fight them using a turn-based tactics mode, similar to the Heroes of Might and Magic series. There are four maps available. Campaigns must be completed in sequence. There is also a skirmish mode and a sandbox mode that allows players to configure various settings to their liking.

== Development ==
Developer Palindrome Interactive is based in Skövde, Sweden. Kalypso Media released Immortal Realms: Vampire Wars for Windows, PlayStation 4, Xbox One, and Nintendo Switch on August 28, 2020.

== Reception ==
Reception

Aggregate scores
Aggregator	Score
Metacritic	(PC) 70/100 (XONE) 67/100 (NS) 68/100 (PS4) 66/100
OpenCritic	41% recommend

Review scores
Publication	Score
Nintendo Life	6/10
Nintendo World Report	7/10

On the review aggregation website Metacritic, Immortal Realms: Vampire Wars received mixed reviews on all platforms. Fellow review aggregator OpenCritic assessed that the game received fair approval, being recommended by 41% of critics. Digitally Downloaded praised the setting, which they said is enjoyable for fans of Gothic horror. Though they also enjoyed the tactical and strategic gameplay, they felt it was hampered by poor AI, a lack of factions, and a complex user interface that made the streamlined gameplay more difficult to understand than necessary. They recommended it to fans of Heroes of Might and Might and Total War but were hopeful of a more fleshed-out sequel. Nintendo Life called it "reasonably fun" and praised the setting. Although they said the streamlined gameplay would be encouraging for newer players, they criticized a lack of depth. They also disliked the AI and user interface. They said it would likely of interest only to fans of turn-based strategy and vampire games. Nintendo World Report said it had frustrating difficulty spikes, poor performance on the Switch, and a poor AI, but they praised the gameplay and replayability.
