= Kommando 1944 =

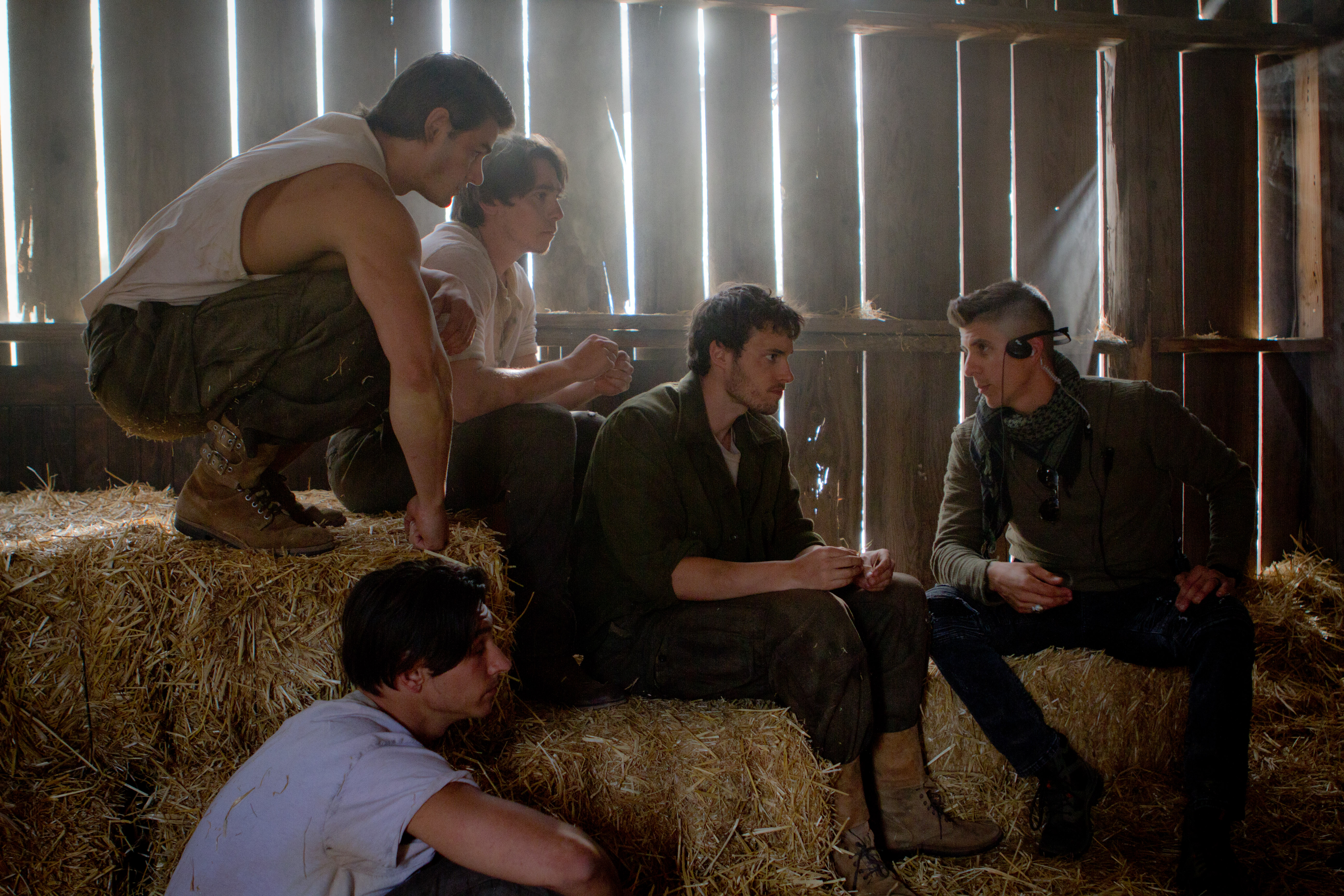
- Directed by: Derek Quick
- Written by: Derek Quick
- Produced by: Derek Quick; Lucy Quick
- Starring: Daniel Joo; Bejo Dohmen; Jeff Seid; Aramis Merlin; Louie Chapman; Mike Bingaman
- Edited by: Derek Quick
- Music by: Ahmed Arifin
- Release date: October 20, 2018
- Running time: 15:44
- Country: United States
- Languages: English, German
- Budget: $90,000 Estimated

Kommando 1944 is a short film directed and written by Derek Quick depicting the internment of Japanese Americans during World War II. The film has won over 100 awards within its first month on the festival circuit around the world (September 2018) and is currently competing to break the Guinness World Records for short film wins.

== Premise ==
The film was Inspired by Quick's Ottawa Tribe of Oklahoma Native American heritage as the grandchild of Charles, [Red Cedar] A. Todd, a US Army Korean War decorated combat veteran and a former Chief of the Ottawa Tribe who faced similar reservation segregation.

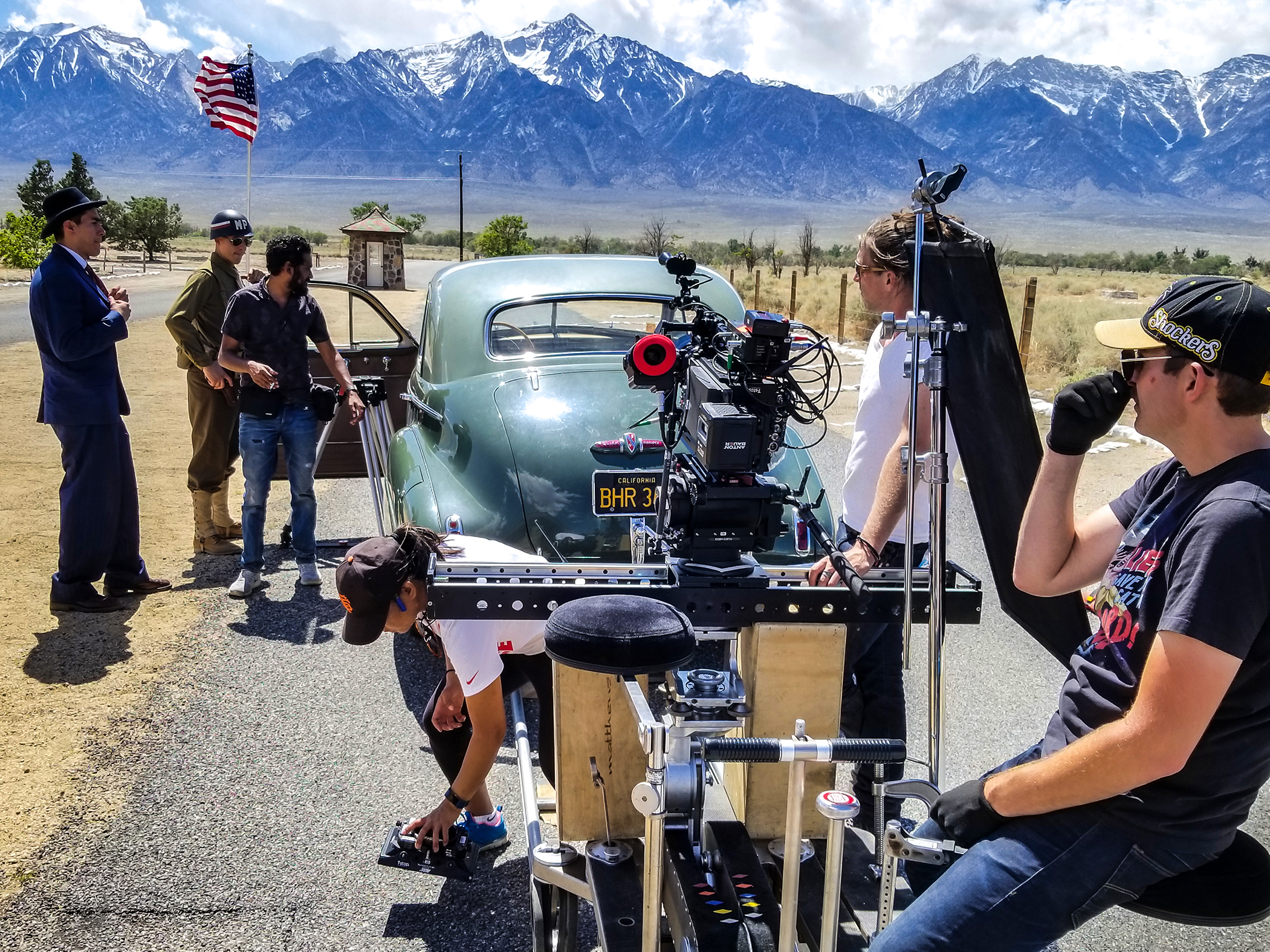
Kommando 1944 at Manzanar Japanses Internment camp. Free to use.

== Awards and nominations ==
Kommando 1944 has screened at Cannes Film Festival with the American Pavilion, Short Shorts and Asia in Japan, an Academy Awards Qualifier. Kommando 1944 was awarded Grand Jury Prize, Outstanding Best Short Film from the cast of Steven Spielberg's Band Of Brothers and screened on D-Day in Normandy France on the 75th Anniversary.

Award	Date of ceremony	Category	Recipients	Result	Ref.
WorldFest-Houston International Film Festival	April 2019	Best Drama Short- Remi Award	Derek Quick	Won	
WorldFest-Houston International Film Festival	April 2019	Best Director-Remi Award	Derek Quick	Won	
