= Praetorians (video game) =

2003 real-time tactics video game

- Developers: Pyro Studios; Torus Games (HD)
- Publishers: Eidos Interactive; Kalypso Media (HD)
- Director: Javier Arévalo
- Producer: Ignacio Pérez Dolset
- Platforms: Microsoft Windows; PlayStation 4 Xbox One
- Release: PAL: February 28, 2003; NA: March 12, 2003; HD Remaster; Windows: WW: January 24, 2020; PlayStation 4, Xbox One: WW: September 18, 2020
- Genre: Real-time strategy
- Modes: Single-player, multiplayer

Praetorians is a 3D real-time tactics video game developed by Pyro Studios and published by Eidos Interactive in 2003, based on Julius Caesar's historical campaigns in Gaul and Britain, Crassus' battles in Parthia, and the events of Caesar's Civil War during the 1st century BC. The player controls either the Roman Republic, the Ptolemaic Kingdom (inaccurately represented as the New Kingdom of Egypt), or a generic barbarian tribe based on the Helvetii, Gauls, and Celts.

== Gameplay ==
Unlike most real-time strategy titles, Praetorians focuses on military strategy and tactics rather than building or resource management. Units are trained from a garrison, which is built on a town or village which requires a garrison to be built and a commander to be sent there to oversee recruitment.

Each civilization comes with its own unique unit pool with units that have different strengths, abilities, and weaknesses. Some unit types are simply re-skinned for all the civilizations, but the variety in units offers different strategic ideas depending on which civilization the player is using. Light infantry units are generally weaker than heavy infantry units in hand-to-hand combat, and are susceptible to arrow fire, but are the only units in the game that can act as builders; the possible buildings they can construct range from wooden bridges and defensive towers to war machines and siege equipment such as towers and ladders. Heavy infantry units are strong in hand-to-hand combat and quite resistant to arrow fire, but generally much slower around the map, and cannot travel over watery terrain. Archer units are poor in hand-to-hand combat, especially against cavalry units, but can set fire to damage buildings and siege equipment. Spear units are generally competent in hand-to-hand combat, particularly in their defensive "stationary" formation when they form a spear-wall, but are susceptible to heavier infantry units and arrow fire, and cannot travel in forests. Cavalry units are quick, can easily outmanoeuvre most troops, and will fare pretty well in hand-to-hand combat with most other units, but they are quite susceptible to arrow fire and most cannot travel in forests.

Each civilization also has access to three highly specialised units that are superior to their "normal" counterparts. For example, Roman civilizations can field Gladiators – infantrymen that are hand-to-hand specialists – who also carry a dragnet which they can use to temporarily immobilise enemy troops, rendering them completely defenceless; Barbarian tribes have access to German Cavalry, who are the only cavalry unit in the game that can travel in forests and who also have a devastating charge; and Egyptian civilizations can recruit specialist archers from Nubia who can fire poison arrows that steadily drain the health points of enemy units. Each civilization also has access to scouts to act as a form of reconnaissance, as well as doctors who can heal their troops; each civilization's doctor also carries a unique ability specific to that culture.

There are multiple types of terrain in the game. Forests can be used to hide infantry units, and to spring ambushes against troops out in the open. Watery terrain prevents heavy infantry units from crossing, unless it is a site where a wooden bridge can be built. Grassy terrain can be lit on fire and can kill troops that cross the fire.

Members of an alliance may not attack one another, though it is still possible to attack an allied building or village belonging to an ally. In times of crisis team members can call upon each other via the message line "We need help". Allies will normally offer spare troops in assistance. Praetorians differs from other games of its genre in that resources do not play a part in it. In most real-time strategy games, items such as wood, food, gold, stone, and glory must be collected, to be spent during the creation of troops; in Praetorians, the only resource the players need in order to recruit stronger soldiers are honour points, which are earned by fighting and killing enemy troops. There are also troop control points and unit control points: the former limits the number of troops a player may have in their army, and the latter limits the number of individual soldiers and army men that can be used.

Praetorians features three game modes: Skirmish, Campaign, and Multiplayer:

=== Skirmish ===
Skirmish functions can be chosen in which the player first chooses a difficulty level (easy, medium, or hard), then up to one character and up to seven AI players, controlled by artificial intelligence. These can be Roman, Egyptian or an anonymous barbarian tribe. Once this is completed, alliances may be created by joining two forces on the same team, whether set before the game has started, or during the game.

=== Campaign ===
Players may participate as Julius Caesar commanding forces of varying sizes against various hostile tribes of barbarian, Egyptian and, nearer the end of the game, Roman origin. The Campaign consists of four Tutorial levels, which educate the player on how to order troops around the map, initiate combat, and best use the units at the player's disposal, and 20 Campaign missions, beginning in 59BC with Caesar fighting the Helvetii tribe, and ending in 45BC with the final battle of the Civil War. The 20 campaign missions are divided into four sections; each new section is preceded by a short film. The sections, including the tutorial missions, are divided by the time period the missions are in. The first section involves leading Caesar's new legions to Gaul to investigate the recent surge of bandit attacks in Aeduii country. The second is the initial stage of the Gallic Wars and focuses on Caesar's battles against the Helvetii and the Nervii. The third section continues directly from the second section, beginning with Caesar crossing the River Rhine and followed by Caesar's invasions of Britannia and Ambiorix's revolt. The fourth section focuses both on Crassus' defeat at Carrhae in 53 BC and the subsequent retreat - two of the most difficult campaign missions, with challenging initial starting positions whilst being significantly outnumbered by the Parthians - along with Vercingetorix's revolt. The final section focuses on the civil war against the Senate and the battles to aid Cleopatra in her succession dispute.

=== Multiplayer ===
Originally, the game was designed to be played online in multiplayer mode using GameSpy. The installer for the game includes instructions and gives the option to install GameSpy Arcade, but GameSpy Arcade no longer offers support for Praetorians game, since they have closed many servers. Instead, players can download and use GameRanger, which offers support for Praetorians multiplayer.

== Development ==
After the Pyro Studios producer of the title, Javier Arévalo, and Eidos' Jason Walker talked about sorting out a flaw in the multiplayer game that was being exploited, an unofficial patch was released in October 2004. This helped catapult the game back up the GameSpy Arena charts.

The latest version of an unofficial extension, called MoD 4.1, became available in 2004; it adds three new factions and many new maps. MoD 4.1 contains the unofficial patch to fix the multi-player game. The next official extension is called MoD 5.0 released in 2013 by Pyro Studios. It sorted out a number of flaws, decreased the hit points of some troops, updated the start screen of the game, added brand new music and sounds, and presented 40 new maps for battles.

In 2008 an unofficial map editor for the PC game Praetorians was released. The map editor is programmed in the C++ programming language and uses the OpenGL computer graphics API. In the same year, the game continued to sell well, maintaining a place in the Top 20 Budget PC Titles on ChartTrack at the time.

In May 2014, GameSpy servers were shut down, thus ending the official multiplayer for Praetorians, but it is possible to use unofficial third-party clients to run and maintain servers for Praetorians.

== Reception ==
=== Sales ===
In the United Kingdom, Praetorians sold roughly 20,000 units during the first half of 2003. Kristan Reed of GamesIndustry.biz wrote that these were "not figures that spell H.I.T." The game ultimately received a "Silver" award from the Entertainment and Leisure Software Publishers Association (ELSPA), indicating sales of at least 100,000 copies in the United Kingdom. It also received a "Gold" award from the Asociación Española de Distribuidores y Editores de Software de Entretenimiento (aDeSe), for more than 40,000 sales in Spain during its first 12 months.

In the German market, Praetorians debuted in third place for March 2003 on Media Control's sales charts for full-price computer games. It fell to 15th place in April and to 24th in May. By June, it was absent from Media Control's top 30.

=== Reviews and awards ===
Reception

Aggregate score
Aggregator	Score
Metacritic	78/100

Review scores
Publication	Score
Computer Games Magazine	3.5/5
Computer Gaming World	4/5
Edge	6/10
Eurogamer	8/10
GameSpot	8.4/10
GameSpy	3/5
GameZone	7.5/10
IGN	8.9/10
PC Gamer (US)	70%
X-Play	4/5

The game received "generally favorable reviews" according to the review aggregation website Metacritic. GamePro noted in its preview that the game is "a healthy mixture of Medieval: Total War and WarCraft". GameSpot praised the graphics, tactical depth, and AI, but the limited camera (lacking the ability to turn 360 degrees), audio (particularly the sound effects, and voice acting), and poor multiplayer matchmaking services were criticised. IGN praised the gameplay, and strategic-focus of the game, as well as its balance, graphics and campaign.

During the 7th Annual Interactive Achievement Awards, the Academy of Interactive Arts & Sciences nominated Praetorians for "Computer Strategy Game of the Year".

In 2017, HobbyConsolas named Praetorians one of the best Spanish games ever released. El Economista offered it the same recognition in 2020.

== Remaster ==
A remastered version of the game was released in 2020 by Kalypso Media. Developed by Torus Games, it includes higher resolution, better textures, and re-activation of the multiplayer mode. The game was released for Microsoft Windows, PlayStation 4 and Xbox One.
