= Ceville =

2009 video game

- German boxart
- Developer(s): Realmforge Studios
- Publisher(s): Kalypso Media
- Designer(s): Benjamin Rauscher; Christian Wolfertstetter
- Programmer(s): Korbinian Abenthum
- Artist(s): Joachim Segler
- Composer(s): Andreas Veith
- Engine: SOMA engine
- Platform(s): Microsoft Windows; Cloud (OnLive)
- Release: February 19, 2009: Windows: GER: February 19, 2009; WW: February 27, 2009
- Genre(s): Graphic adventure
- Mode(s): Single-player

Ceville is a humorous graphic adventure video game developed by the German game studio Realmforge Studios and published by Kalypso Media. Despite the game's use of 3D environments and models, the gameplay is very true to the graphical point-and-click adventure tradition of gameplay, immortalized by game series like Monkey Island from LucasArts and the King's Quest series from Sierra Online.

== Plot ==
The evil and sarcastic tyrant King Ceville is thrown from power by an angry mob and must find a way to reclaim the crown of the fantasy realm Faeryanis. Together with his sidekick Lilly he travels all over the land and encounters a variety of odd and lovable characters including a Dark Knight who smokes too much and The Good Fairy (character from the classic folk tale Cinderella) who runs a rehabilitation clinic for former archvillains.

== Reception ==
NowGamer praised the game as resembling Monkey Island and for being a step in the revival of adventure games. The game was criticized for having a few technical issues, most notably a habit of crashing for no obvious reason. The Norwegian radio program Hardcore praised the game in its review for its elegance and charm. German GameStar magazine gave 86% and two awards, PCGames 80% and PC Action 81%. Gamestar Hungary's rating is 83%. IGN gave the game a 9.0 grade. IT Reviews hailed it as "a welcome return to the Golden Age of animated adventure gaming".

== See also ==
- Monkey Island series
- Runaway: A Twist of Fate
