= Commando (company) =

American underwear company

Commando LLC
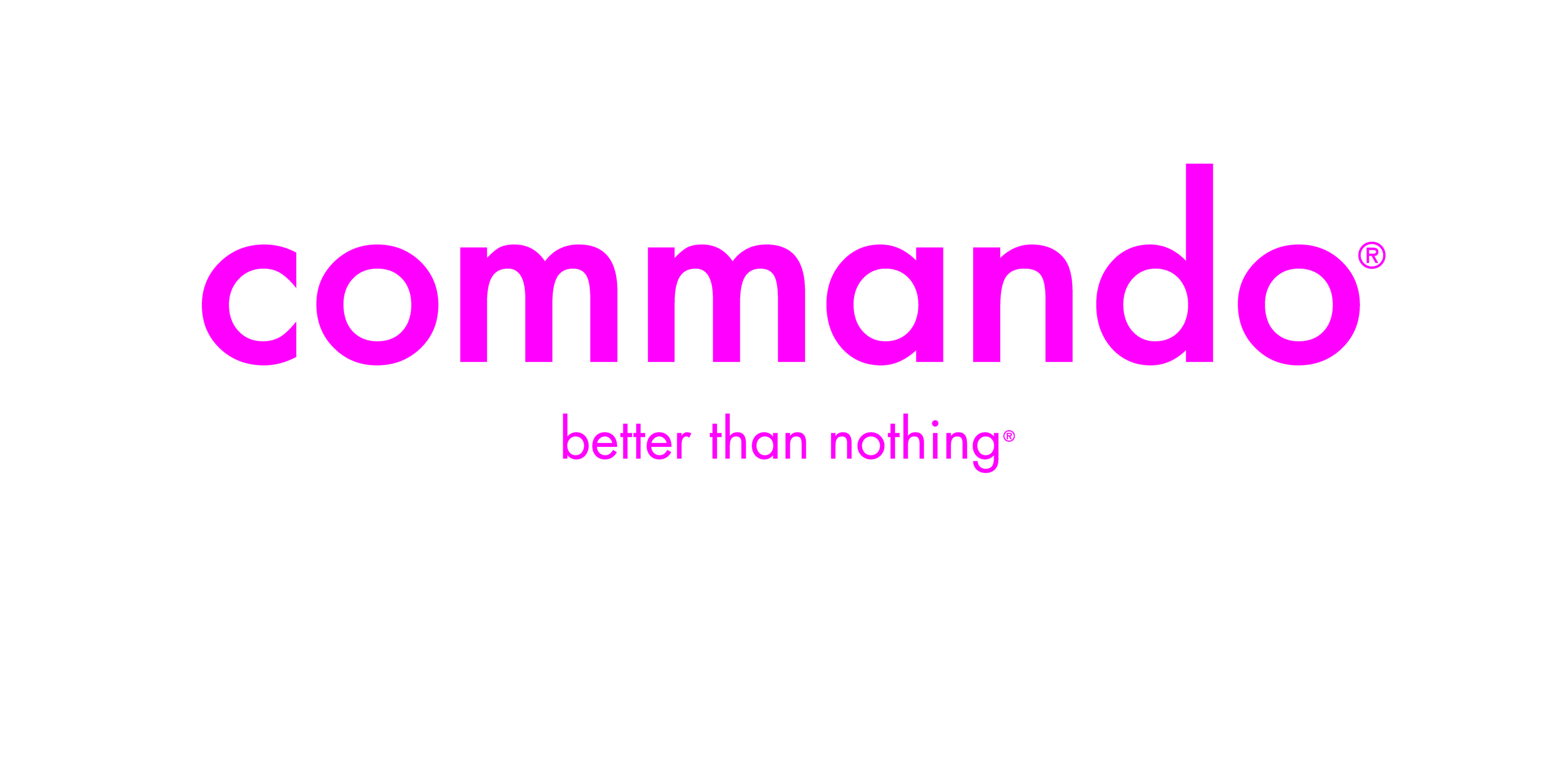
- Formerly: Her Look Enterprises LLC
- Type: Private
- Industry: Clothing
- Founded: 2003
- Founder: Kerry O'Brien
- Headquarters: South Burlington, Vermont
- Area served: International
- Products: Undergarments
- Number of employees: 50

Commando is an American underwear company based in Vermont. Founder Kerry O'Brien pioneered "raw cut" undergarments with no seams, elastic or trim on the edges. Commando is reportedly more present at red carpet events such as the Academy Awards and New York Fashion Week than any other underwear brand. The undergarments appear at over 30 New York Fashion Week shows per season.

== History ==
Kerry O'Brien, former senior vice president for Weber Shandwick, initially founded the company in 2003 when she launched Takeouts, a line of removable bra inserts packaged in Chinese-food type containers. In 2005, O'Brien introduced her line of "raw cut" undergarments called Commando, named after the phrase "going commando." After the line's launch, it received attention from fashion designers around the country and the company was later renamed Commando.

Initially, O'Brien sold her line to retailers door to door. In the first year of operations, more than 500 stores sold Commando and the company reached $1 million in sales.

O'Brien designs undergarments that do not show under clothing and are made without elastic. Her elastic-free waistband and weighted slip are patented. Commando undergarments led to O'Brien's nomination to serve on the Council of Fashion Designers of America.

In 2005, O’Brien introduced the company’s signature raw‑cut undergarments, designed without elastic or trim to eliminate visible panty lines, and soon renamed the company Commando after the colloquial phrase “going commando.” The brand quickly expanded through direct sales to retailers and became known for its fabric‑forward innovation and celebrity following. Originally focused on intimate apparel, Commando extended its offerings into hosiery, shapewear, and ready‑to‑wear apparel throughout the 2010s. Wikipedia

In September 2024, Commando launched its first men’s underwear and essentials collection, featuring briefs, trunks, and undershirts engineered with the brand’s signature focus on comfort and technical fabrics. This marked the company’s first formal entry into menswear after nearly two decades as a women’s fashion brand. CFDA

In 2025, Commando celebrated its 20th anniversary as a design and fashion brand. The milestone year included a curated Founders Collection highlighting signature pieces that shaped the brand’s evolution and a larger campaign spotlighting its legacy of innovation.

Founder and CEO Kerry O’Brien has been recognized within the fashion industry for her contributions. In October 2025, she was honored with the Fashion Group International Founders’ Award at the 41st Annual FGI Night of Stars gala, celebrating her impact on fashion and the brand’s longevity.

Commando’s cultural footprint has grown beyond intimate apparel, with prominent media coverage acknowledging its evolution from undergarments to a comprehensive fashion brand across ready‑to‑wear, hosiery, and wardrobe staples for a diverse clientele. A 2025 feature in People magazine highlighted the brand’s 20‑year journey and ongoing influence in fashion.

== Overview ==
Commando products are made with microfiber, seamless, and are raw cut. They are sold online as well as in 1,200 department stores including Bloomingdale's, Neiman Marcus, Nordstrom and Saks Fifth Avenue. Commando is considered to have a wide celebrity following and has been worn by public figures such as Rihanna, Jennifer Lopez, Jessica Alba, Emily Blunt, Emma Watson, Kim Kardashian, Kristen Stewart and Jennifer Lawrence. Fashion stylists and fashion labels that use the brand include Brad Goreski, Prabal Gurung, Lela Rose, Milly, Monique Lhuillier, Tracy Reese, Rodarte and Nicole Miller.
