= Classic British Motor Racing =

2008 video game

- Wii North American box art
- Developer: Data Design Interactive
- Publishers: EU: Metro3D Europe (PlayStation 2 and PC); EU: Data Design Interactive (Wii); NA: Bold Games
- Producers: Stewart Green, John Brooks
- Programmers: Julian Alden-Salter, Rob Mann
- Artists: Michael Rooker, Teoman Irmak, Ed Pattman, Dean Guy, Sam King
- Engine: GODS
- Platforms: Wii, PlayStation 2, Windows
- Release: PlayStation 2, Windows: EU: 10 February 2006; Wii: NA: 2 January 2008; EU: 14 March 2008; AU: 15 May 2008
- Genre: Racing
- Modes: Single-player, multiplayer

Classic British Motor Racing is a racing video game developed by budget developer Data Design Interactive. It was published by Bold Games (Destineer) in North America in early 2008, and in PAL regions 2–4 months later. The game features 13 tracks and 13 classic British cars licensed by the developer, and players drive around famous areas of Britain. The game is playable with up to two people. Reviews were critically negative, which the Wii version holds a score of 35.50% from GameRankings, while the PS2 holds a score of 35%, respectively. The PlayStation 2 and Windows versions were released on 10 February 2006.

== Gameplay ==
Classic British Motor Racing is a racing game where players pick from a host of classic British vehicles and drive around famous areas of Britain, which can be played in 3 difficulties, Beginner, Intermediate, and Expert. The game only runs on 480i and up to two players can race in the game. While racing, players tilt the Wii Remote to steer their car and hold the 2 button to accelerate, or the 1 button to go backwards. To unlock tracks, players must win tracks to unlock the locked tracks in the game, which players also can unlock other Cars too. A pop song is also played in every race.

== Development ==
Minneapolis-based publisher/developer Bold Games partnered with England's Data Design Interactive to distribute and publish ten casual Wii titles, with Classic British Motor Racing as one of them. Paul Rinde, CEO of Bold Games parent company Destineer, said that he was thrilled to be working with Data Design Interactive as their entry into the Wii casual games market. Stewart Green, president of Data Design Interactive, was very pleased to be working with Bold Games, and was happy to have their "titles as the starting point for its entry into this exciting market sector". The first titles from the Bold Games/DDI partnership were scheduled to be in stores by the end of the year 2007.

The developer licensed 13 classic British cars, and 6 tracks from the British Isles. Like all games developed by Data Design, it was created using the 'Game Orientated Development System' (or G.O.D.S.) engine. The engine was developed to produce the game for multiple systems.

== Reception ==
Like many Data Design Interactive games, the Wii version received negative reviews from critics. The Wii version currently holds a score of 35.50%. IGN gave the Wii version a 2.1 out of ten and criticised the gameplay problems, awful graphics, and for only having one song that loops. The PlayStation 2 version also received negative reviews. It currently holds a score of 35% on GameRankings, in respective to the Wii version.
