= Imperial Glory =

2005 video game

- Developers: Pyro Studios; Robosoft Technologies (Mac)
- Publishers: Eidos Interactive, Feral Interactive (Mac)
- Producer: César Valencia Perello
- Writers: Ignacio Pérez Dolset; César Valencia Perello
- Composer: Mateo Pascual
- Platforms: Microsoft Windows, Mac OS X
- Release: Windows: NA: May 17, 2005; EU: May 20, 2005; OS X December 1, 2006
- Genre: Real-time tactics
- Modes: Single-player, multiplayer

Imperial Glory is a 2005 real-time tactics video game, developed by Pyro Studios and published by Eidos Interactive for Microsoft Windows. Feral Interactive released a Mac OS X version of the game in December 2006.

Imperial Glory is set in the Revolutionary and Napoleonic eras, between 1789 and 1815, and allows the player to choose one of the great empires of the age – Great Britain, France, Austria, Russia or Prussia–on their quest of conquering Europe, North Africa and the Middle East. The game is similar to the Total War series: it consists of a 2-D strategic campaign and fully 3-D land and naval.

== Gameplay ==
=== Units ===
The basic units available to the player are the same, regardless of the nation the player controls, namely, infantry, cavalry and artillery. By seizing appropriate provinces, a player may deploy other units, such as Arabian camel cavalry. The principal units are infantry, cavalry, and artillery.

Infantry in Imperial Glory are represented as militia, line infantry, light infantry, grenadiers, riflemen and the player's country's elite force (e.g. British Black Watch). Cavalry consists of dragoons, hussars, lancers and an elite cavalry type (such as Life Guards for Britain), and it is possible to find such contemporary pieces of artillery as six-pounder cannons and howitzers.

In the campaign phase of the game, units are moved around the map by assigning them to a commander. Commanders bear the ranks of captain, colonel, general or field marshal. Each can command a certain number of units and be promoted to a higher rank by winning encounters with enemy units.

During naval battles, players can engage the enemy with various ships: sloops, frigates or ships of the line.

=== Tactics ===
The main weapon of the infantry is the musket, which lowers the opportunity to involve soldiers in hand-to-hand combat (players may order them to commence a bayonet charge). Hence, the tactics have to be adjusted to this new setting. The game offers a variety of unit formations, enabling players to engage in combat operations with greater efficiency.

=== Peaceful activities ===
Aside from fighting, players may engage in diplomacy, including several alliance options. Many different kinds of buildings can be constructed, which can be fortified, and which give certain advantages to the player, including providing a basis for recruitment of units. Effort applied to research leads to the development of new types of units to be recruited and different buildings that may be built. Trade routes can be set up as well, either to trade with other nations or establish internal commerce.

== Reception ==
Reception

Aggregate score
Aggregator	Score
Metacritic	69/100

Review scores
Publication	Score
1Up.com	C+
Computer Games Magazine	2.5/5
Computer Gaming World	2.5/5
Eurogamer	6/10
GameSpot	6.7/10
GameSpy	3/5
GameZone	8/10
IGN	8.5/10
PC Gamer (US)	90%
X-Play	4/5

Imperial Glory received "average" reviews according to the review aggregation website Metacritic. GameSpot highlighted its "picturesque" 3D land and naval battles and "rich" diplomacy system, but said that the land battles lack epic feel, the naval battles are tough to coordinate, and there are only five historical battles to play. They were also critical to its AI due to the lack of morale system, in which the units in the game behave unrealistically. They concluded that Imperial Glory had a lot of promise and potential, but also a few missed opportunities.
