= Commandos 2: Men of Courage =

2001 video game

- Developer: Pyro Studios (Note: Ported to Mac OS X by Zonic Limited. Remastered version developed by Yippee! Entertainment. Nintendo Switch port of remastered version developed by Raylight Games.)
- Publisher: Eidos Interactive (Note: Mac OS X port published by Feral Interactive. Remastered version published by Kalypso Media.)
- Composer: Mateo Pascual
- Series: Commandos
- Platforms: Microsoft Windows: PlayStation 2; Xbox; Mac OS X; PlayStation 4; Xbox One; Nintendo Switch
- Release: September 20, 2001: Windows; NA: September 20, 2001; EU: September 28, 2001; AU: October 5, 2001; PlayStation 2; NA: August 27, 2002; EU: September 6, 2002; AU: February 6, 2004; Xbox; EU: September 13, 2002; NA: September 17, 2002; AU: February 6, 2004; Mac OS X; June 3, 2005; HD Remaster; PlayStation 4, Xbox One; WW: September 18, 2020; Nintendo Switch; WW: December 4, 2020
- Genre: Real-time tactics
- Modes: Single-player, multiplayer

Commandos 2: Men of Courage is a real-time tactics video game, developed by Pyro Studios, published by Eidos Interactive, and released on September 20, 2001. It is the sequel to Commandos: Behind Enemy Lines (1998) and the second installment of the Commandos series. It was released for Microsoft Windows, PlayStation 2 and Xbox. The player takes control of a squad of commandos, along with various allied units, as they sneak behind enemy lines to accomplish various missions in World War II, between 1941 and 1944, that will help them to thwart the war efforts of Nazi Germany and the Empire of Japan. The game features several improvements to the gameplay from its predecessor, including the ability to use enemy weapons and explore interior locations, the inclusion of three new commandos, a number of new skills for the original six members along with their other abilities, and new pieces of equipment to help overcome the enemy.

While the PC version of the game was well received, the console versions received less favourable reviews. In 2005, the game was bundled together with Commandos 3: Destination Berlin (2003) as part of the Commandos Battle Pack by Feral Interactive.

A remastered version of the game, featuring updated graphics and controls, was released by Kalypso Media in 2020 for Microsoft Windows, PlayStation 4, Xbox One, and Nintendo Switch.

== Gameplay ==
In Commandos 2 the player takes on the role of an allied officer in charge of directing a group of commandos, each with a different set of skills and abilities that they can use, who take part in a series of twenty-one missions – two training stages to get used to controlling the commandos; ten story missions; and nine bonus missions that feature unique challenges and situations to complete, but are only accessible after each story mission is completed, if the player acquires a set of books marked "bonus" within each of them. Each mission in the game features a series of objectives, divided between main and secondary, that the player needs to complete in order to finish a mission, including securing an escape route from an area, as well as clues to where players can find supplies or locate useful assets to help them with their mission; while briefings for each mission outline most objectives and clues, others are provided through completing current objectives or clues the player has knowledge of (i.e. if an objective is to contact someone and the player completes this, the contact might provide an additional objective and/or clue for the player to use).

Each mission features the player having control of a subset of commandos, though in some missions, the player begins with a few commandos to use, but can gain control of others through either contacting them somewhere in the mission's location, or rescuing them from imprisonment. The original six from the previous game are once more available for use, though some have a few notable improvements in how they can be used – the Green Beret can now climb telephone poles and traverse their cables, can jump out of windows, and can carry small containers around; the Sniper can climb up telephone poles to use them as sniping positions; the Spy can now not only direct soldiers and lieutenants to look somewhere else, but can order soldiers and enemy staff to move somewhere else if disguised as an officer, while his syringe can now daze, knock out, or kill an enemy, depending on the number of doses they are given; the Diver now kills enemies by throwing knives at them, and now carries a grappling hook that can be used to traverse walls or set up a tripwire to knock out enemies; the Driver can now set up traps, both lethal and non-lethal; and the Sapper can now use a mine detector to find buried land mines and disarm them, as well as set-up mines to eliminate infantry and armoured vehicles. Along with these six, the players also gets control two new members to use, including: the Thief, who is the most agile of the group, can climb in and out of windows and through small holes, hide in tight spaces, climb and traverse telephone poles and cables like the Green Beret, and unlock metal containers and some doors with his lockpicks; and Whiskey, a dog who the commandos can use to trade items between them, as well as bark near enemies to distract them. In addition to the commandos, players also gain control of allied units, most of whom can be equipped with weapons and placed in four different combat stances, including firing out of windows and crouching down, and thus be used to combat enemies when needed.

Other new features include the player being able to explore interior locations and underwater locations, facing additional threats such as wild animals and Gestapo soldiers, the ability to salvage enemy weapons from their bodies to use when needed, such as rifles and submachine guns, the ability to use multiple cameras to survey a mission's location, the ability to hide bodies in bodies of water or amongst certain objects such as reeds, and the inclusion of new equipment – binoculars, flamethrowers, molotov cocktails, smoke grenades, rope ladders, gas grenades, canned food and first aid kits. While the various gameplay mechanics from Behind Enemy Lines are still used, such as line of sight, the ability to view enemy positions, and other enemy behaviours, such as investigating suspicious sounds or reacting to alarms, a number of areas received notable changes – all commandos can wear enemy soldier uniforms, though unlike the Spy, the effect last only for a limited time and as long as they stay out of close range of enemies; cars and lorries can be driven by all commandos, but armoured cars require the Driver, and tanks need both him and the Sapper; the inventory system is a grid-like space, with objects taking up a certain number of spaces depending on their size; enemies now display a line of sight when detecting something in their view, which is orange for something that has caught their interest, blue if they spotted something suspicious, and red if they have seen a commando; and commandos will be shot on sight if they are discovered by the enemy, rather than captured, while alarms last for a while before they eventually end, although guards will investigate the area that triggered it.

== Plot ==
The interface for Commandos 2: Men of Courage. The commandos are displayed in the top left, the game commands and map are in the top right and the actions that can be performed by the selected commando are in the bottom right. This screenshot shows the "Target: Burma" mission, which involves the commandos rescuing a spiritual leader and a unit of Gurkhas.

In May 1941, commandos Paul Toledo and Natasha Nikochevski capture an Enigma machine and its codebook in a German submarine base at La Pallice in La Rochelle, France. While Natasha leaves the base, Toledo is ordered to stay behind with the Enigma to assist the other commandos (Jack O'Hara, Thomas Hancock, James Blackwood, and René Duchamp) when they arrive at daybreak to rescue the crew of a Royal Navy submarine, the E-423, sheltered and under heavy guard in a submarine pen. They destroy the base's anti-aircraft guns and torpedo warehouse before escaping in the submarine.

While in the North Sea, the Royal Navy submarine is caught and forced to surface in the frigid waters after being depth charged by a German destroyer. The Enigma machine is confiscated and the entire crew captured with the exception of Blackwood and Hancock, both of whom evaded capture. After rescuing the crew, the commandos proceed to recover the Enigma and disable the destroyer's main guns and fire room. Under orders that the Enigma be hastily brought to England, O'Hara and Duchamp takeoff in a Fieseler Fi 156 Storch, while the rest escape in the submarine.

A year passes and the commandos are deployed to the Pacific Theatre. In Burma, they rescue a spiritual leader and assassinate a Japanese tyrant with the help of Gurkhas. On 17 June 1942, the commandos are sent to northern Thailand, where they rescue a Colonel Guinness, who in turn helps them destroy the bridge over the River Kwai by revealing its structural weakness. The bridge is blown up just as a train of the Imperial Japanese Army high command crosses it, plummeting into the river.

In July 1942, the commandos land on the strongly fortified Savo Island to disable the large artillery guns, before Operation Watchtower can commence. While on the island, they are assisted by a castaway named Wilson. After destroying the artillery and rescuing a downed American pilot, he returns the favour by piloting a Kawanishi H8K to help them escape the island, but not before telling them of a gold monkey statue which is symbolic to the Japanese. O'Hara steals it as a souvenir.

In Spring of 1944, the commandos are sent to Haiphong, Indochina, destroying the port's fuel depots and infiltrating the Japanese aircraft carrier Shinano. While out at sea, the commandos sabotage the rudder of every Mitsubishi A6M Zero and report the carrier's position before escaping in two intact Zeroes. The Shinano is then bombed by American Vought F4U Corsairs.

Following their tour of duty in the Pacific, the commandos are recalled to the Western Front for the Battle of Normandy. During the Battle of Cherbourg, they rescue a wounded Private Smith, and with the help of American soldiers, successfully defend the town from waves of German infantry and Panzer III tanks. A few months later, Toledo is captured and taken to Colditz Castle where he is to be executed. The commandos save him and they help the prisoners of war housed there escape by disguising them in German uniform. While the prisoners escape, the commandos acquire top secret documents from three high-ranking German officers, revealing plans to devastate Paris with planted explosives before it is liberated.

In August 1944, the commando corps arrive in Paris and thwart plans to destroy much of the city, before leaving in an airship from the top of the Eiffel Tower.

== Development and release ==
Commandos 2 was developed on a budget of roughly $7 million.

The game was released in 2001 for Microsoft Windows in North America on September 20, in the United Kingdom on September 28, and in Australia on October 5. It was released in 2002 for PlayStation 2 in North America on August 27, in the United Kingdom on September 6, and in Australia on February 6, 2004. It released for Xbox in the United Kingdom on September 13, 2002, in North America on September 17, and in Australia on February 6, 2004. Developed by Zonic and published by Feral Interactive, a port for Mac OS X was released on June 3, 2005, as part of Commandos Battle Pack, a compilation bundling the game with its sequel Commandos 3: Destination Berlin (2003).

A remastered version of the game, Commandos 2 – HD Remaster, featuring updated graphics and controls, developed by Yippee! Entertainment and published by Kalypso Media was released in 2020: for Microsoft Windows on January 24, PlayStation 4 and Xbox One on September 18, and for the Nintendo Switch on December 4.

== Reception ==
=== Sales ===
Reception

Aggregate score
Aggregator	Score		
Aggregator	PC	PS2	Xbox
Metacritic	87/100	67/100	67/100

Review scores
Publication	Score		
Publication	PC	PS2	Xbox
Computer Games Magazine	4/5	N/A	N/A
Computer Gaming World	4.5/5	N/A	N/A
Computer and Video Games	8/10	N/A	N/A
Edge	7/10	N/A	N/A
Eurogamer	9/10	N/A	N/A
Game Informer	7.5/10	N/A	6/10
GamePro	N/A	N/A	2/5
GameRevolution	B+	C	N/A
GameSpot	8.8/10	7.5/10	7.8/10
GameSpy	93%	3/5	4/5
GameZone	9/10	9/10	N/A
IGN	9/10	7/10	7/10
Next Generation	3/5	N/A	N/A
Official U.S. PlayStation Magazine	N/A	2/5	N/A
Official Xbox Magazine (US)	N/A	N/A	7.2/10
PC Gamer (US)	80%	N/A	N/A

According to Eidos Interactive chairman Ian Livingstone, more than 500,000 units of Commandos 2: Men of Courage were shipped on launch and the title entered the retail charts in the top five in all major markets, but reported that it sold below expectations and contributed to the company's £11 million loss in the quarter. The game ultimately surpassed 500,000 units sold by September 2002. The game's computer version received a "Silver" sales award from the Entertainment and Leisure Software Publishers Association (ELSPA), indicating sales of at least 100,000 copies in the United Kingdom; a "Gold" certification from the Verband der Unterhaltungssoftware Deutschland (VUD), for sales of at least 100,000 units across Germany, Austria and Switzerland; and a "Platinum" prize in Spain, for over 80,000 sales in the country during its first year. Its PlayStation 2 version sold 40,000 units in the region.

=== Critical reception ===
The PC version received "generally favorable reviews", while the PlayStation 2 and Xbox versions received "average" reviews, according to the review aggregation website Metacritic. With an aggregate score of 87, the computer version of Commandos 2 is the highest-rated Spanish game listed on Metacritic. The PC version was praised for the AI which was advanced for the time but criticized for the steep learning curve. Many reviewers found that the controls of the console versions were much less intuitive and easy to use than the PC controls and that they made the game more difficult as a result. Most reviewers recommended the PC version instead.

Carla Harker from Next Generation gave three stars out of five for PC version, and called the game "insanely" difficult.

GameLive PC named Commandos 2 the best strategy game of 2001–2002. The editors of Computer Games Magazine nominated Commandos 2 as the best real-time strategy game of 2001, but ultimately gave the award to Kohan: Immortal Sovereigns. It was likewise a runner-up for The Electric Playground's "Best Strategy Game for PC" prize, which went to Etherlords.

In 2021, GQ España named Commandos 2 one of the best Spanish-made games ever.

== High-definition remaster ==
After owning the rights to the series when the original company Pyro Studios went defunct in 2017, Kalypso Media released a high-definition remaster of Commandos 2 in 2020. It received mixed reviews due to poor controls, underwhelming up-res and heavy censorship; any Nazi symbolism has been removed from the game.
