= Commandos: Strike Force =

2006 video game

- Developer: Pyro Studios
- Publisher: Eidos Interactive
- Producer: José Manuel García Franco
- Designer: Jorge Rosado de Álvaro
- Writers: Ignacio Pérez Dolset; Jorge Rosado de Álvaro
- Series: Commandos
- Engine: RenderWare
- Platforms: Microsoft Windows; PlayStation 2 Xbox
- Release: EU: 17 March 2006; NA: 4 April 2006
- Genre: First-person shooter
- Modes: Single-player, multiplayer

Commandos: Strike Force is a first-person tactical shooter video game and the fourth installment of the Commandos series. It is developed by Pyro Studios and published by Eidos Interactive.

Released during the first months of 2006, the game makes a departure from the first four games. Although the missions are set up in a similar fashion (several objectives, some to be achieved through stealth, others through use of force) and in most occasions the player is allowed to change between characters, this is the first game in the series to apply a first-person perspective, like many other World War II-inspired games, in contrast to the overhead view of the earlier games. Hence, the game is far more similar to the Medal of Honor or Call of Duty games than to earlier entries of the series.

Unlike the previous Commandos games, Strike Force is not available on digital stores like Steam or GOG.com, instead only being on Zoom platform.

== Gameplay ==
The player is required to complete a number of objectives in each mission. Throughout the missions, the player will make use of either one or two of the three members of the Strike Force. Each Strike Force member has particular weapons, tools and talents suited to their role. The Green Beret can wield Pistols akimbo and heavy weaponry. The Sniper use scoped rifles and throwing knives and is the only one who can swim in freezing water. The Spy can use a silenced pistol and gas grenades (provided with a gas mask) and wear any uniforms acquired to fool lower ranked soldiers.

== Plot ==
The game is split between three campaigns in France, Norway and the Soviet Union during World War II. The first campaign takes place in occupied France in 1942. The Strike Force commandos consist of the British sniper: Lieutenant William Hawkins, London's Green Beret: Captain Francis O'Brien and the German (But not Nazi) spy and leader: Colonel George Brown. The commandos assist the French resistance to secure a village, but are forced to evacuate when their positions are compromised by a double agent (O'Brien suspecting that it is Brown). Brown aids the resistance in a town by taking out all targets of opportunity and liberating a medical doctor.

The next campaign takes the commandos to occupied Norway, as they find out that the Nazis are attempting to win the race for Nuclear fission, so they fight through a port town and several guard posts in the water, in order for them to move the explosives required to destroy the secret facilities. Under cover of darkness, the commandos launch a surprise attack on the Nazi-occupied town of Shundein, as it was also part of the route the explosives truck must follow. After a long battle, the enemy is repelled from the town.

The last campaign brings the commandos to Stalingrad in order to retrieve a priceless Russian relic which the Nazis have seized. The Commandos are aided by the Soviet Commisar Salenkov and led to a sewer. Once in the sewers, Lieutenant Hawkins finds a platoon heading their way, so Brown has his teammates captured to allow himself to freely explore the garrisoned town and infiltrate the headquarters, where he rescues his teammates and retrieves the relic. During their exfiltration, Brown finds that the double agent and Nazi informer is none other than Salenkov, who had purposefully led them to the sewers as he knew they would be captured that way. Brown kills the traitor and drives the commandos out of the HQ. Hawkins and O'Brien take out various targets in the ruins of the town, then group up with a Red Army squad to repel several waves of Nazi invaders. Their victory ends with Brown reuniting with the commandos and celebrating.

== Development ==
Pyro Studios was briefly considering a Commandos 4 game, but ultimately decided to introduce their franchise to console systems by creating a first-person shooter. Taking players' frustrations of the previous games into consideration, the company decided to balance the difficulty elements to their new game. They chose not to base the missions and levels on historically accurate events to make the game design flexible, while deriving some elements from the previous games in the series.

== Reception ==
Reception

Aggregate score
Aggregator	Score		
Aggregator	PC	PS2	Xbox
Metacritic	62/100	58/100	62/100

Review scores
Publication	Score		
Publication	PC	PS2	Xbox
Computer Games Magazine	2/5	N/A	N/A
Computer Gaming World	(unfavorable)	N/A	N/A
Electronic Gaming Monthly	N/A	5.17/10	5.17/10
Eurogamer	7/10	N/A	N/A
Famitsu	N/A	26/40	N/A
Game Informer	5.5/10	5.5/10	5.5/10
GameSpot	5.7/10	5.7/10	5.7/10
GameSpy	N/A	2.5/5	2.5/5
GameTrailers	7/10	7/10	7/10
GameZone	6.8/10	5.9/10	N/A
IGN	7.5/10	7.5/10	7.5/10
Official U.S. PlayStation Magazine	N/A	2/5	N/A
Official Xbox Magazine (US)	N/A	N/A	6/10
PC Gamer (US)	65%	N/A	N/A
The Sydney Morning Herald	2.5/5	2.5/5	2.5/5

The game received "mixed" reviews on all platforms according to the review aggregation website Metacritic. Fans of the earlier games in the series felt that Strike Force lacked the trademark difficulty of the previous games. Similarly, it was promoted as mixing elements of strategy from the past games with traditional first-person shooter gameplay, but instead only hinted them while being predominantly action oriented. As a result, both critics and fans felt it did little to distance itself from the recent flood of similar games. In Japan, where the PlayStation 2 version was ported and published by Spike on 21 September 2006, Famitsu gave it a score of two sevens and two sixes for a total of 26 out of 40.

The game sold poorly overall, but received an award for sales of at least 40,000 units in Spain.
