= Commandos (series) =

- Genre: Real-time tactics
- Developers: Pyro Studios; Claymore Game Studios
- Publishers: Eidos Interactive; Kalypso Media
- Platforms: Windows, OS X, Linux, PlayStation 2, PlayStation 4, Xbox, PlayStation 5, Xbox Series X/S
- First release: Commandos: Behind Enemy Lines; 24 June 1998
- Latest release: Commandos: Origins; 10 April 2025

Commandos is a stealth-oriented real-time tactics video game series. The five games released between 1998 and 2006 are all set during World War II and follow the adventures of a fictional Allied commando unit. Each mission is loosely based on historical events during World War II to carry the plot. The series was developed by the Spanish developer Pyro Studios and published by Eidos Interactive. The series has sold a total of 3.3 million copies and generated $41 million of revenue at retail.

== Games ==
Year	Title	Genre	Platform(s)	
Year	Title	Genre	PC	Console
1998	Commandos: Behind Enemy Lines	Isometric real-time tactics	Windows	—N/a
1999	Commandos: Beyond the Call of Duty	Isometric real-time tactics	Windows	—N/a
2001	Commandos 2: Men of Courage	Isometric real-time tactics	Windows, macOS	PS2, Xbox
2003	Commandos 3: Destination Berlin	Isometric real-time tactics	Windows, macOS	—N/a
2006	Commandos: Strike Force	First-person tactical shooter	Windows	PS2, Xbox
2020	Commandos 2: HD Remaster	Isometric real-time tactics	Windows, macOS, Linux	PS4, Xbox One, Switch
2022	Commandos 3: HD Remaster	Isometric real-time tactics	Windows	PS4, Xbox One, Switch
2025	Commandos: Origins	Isometric real-time tactics	Windows	PS5, Xbox Series X/S, PS4, Xbox One

=== Commandos: Behind Enemy Lines ===
Commandos: Behind Enemy Lines (CBEL) was released on 1 July 1998. It was published by Eidos Interactive and developed by Pyro Studios. It features 20 missions. The view is isometric with tactical gameplay. A Sega Mega Drive/Genesis version of Commandos: Behind Enemy Lines, with the first 5 missions, was also made by Russian homebrew programmers, but lacked sound and certain other features of the PC version.

=== Commandos: Beyond the Call of Duty ===
Commandos: Beyond the Call of Duty, a set of new Commandos missions issued as a standalone game, was released on 31 March 1999. Despite it being much shorter than Behind Enemy Lines, it is a much more difficult game containing levels on a far greater scale to the extent of being comparable to those that were to be seen in Commandos 2. It has 8 missions, with locations including Yugoslavia and Greece.

=== Commandos 2: Men of Courage ===
A full sequel, released in 2001, was rebuilt with a 3D engine, more interactive environments, more skills for the commandos, and new characters. Like its predecessor, it drew heavily from war films and titled its levels in reference to such films as The Bridge on the River Kwai and Saving Private Ryan. The game received even greater praise.

Several new characters were added to the series in this sequel: a thief called Paul "Lupin" Toledo, a dog called Whiskey and Wilson, a shot-down pilot claiming to be from the Light Brigade.

A remastered version of the game, called Commandos 2 - HD Remaster, was released in 2020.

=== Commandos 3: Destination Berlin ===
This is the third sequel in the series and was released in October 2003. In this game the mouse wheel can be used to rotate the player's vantage point. It was the first in the series to use a true 3D engine, but the game was criticized for its short missions and lack of hotkeys.

A remastered version of the game, called Commandos 3 - HD Remaster, was released in 2022.

=== Commandos: Strike Force ===
Released during the first months of 2006, this game marks a diversion from the first three games. Although the missions are set up in a similar fashion (several different objectives, some to be achieved through stealth, others through use of force) and in most occasions the player is allowed to change between different characters, this is the first game in the series to apply a first-person perspective, similar to Medal of Honor or Call of Duty games than to earlier entries of the series.

Strike Force only has three Commandos, making it the game with the least amount of playable characters in the series. They are the Green Beret, The Sniper and The Spy but they are not the same characters from previous instalments; they each bear different appearances, names, and skills.

The game attracted an overwhelmingly negative reaction, especially from fans of the earlier games in the series who saw this as a massive modification, concurrent with a great reduction in the series' trademark difficulty. Similarly, it was promoted as mixing elements of strategy from the past games with traditional first-person shooter game-play but instead only hinted at them whilst being predominantly action-oriented. As a result, both critics and fans felt it did little to distance itself from the recent flood of similar games.

=== Commandos: Origins ===
A prequel, Commandos: Origins, developed by Claymore Game Studios and published by Kalypso Media, was released on PlayStation 5, Xbox Series, and PC on April 9, 2025. It serves as a prequel to Commandos: Behind Enemy Lines, and tells the story of the formation of the Commandos team.

== Music ==
David Garcia-Morales Inés composed the music of the first game and Mateo Pascual that of the next four installments. All five soundtracks are available on iTunes and Amazon.

== Remasters ==
After the series was acquired by Kalypso Media, in 2020 and 2022 respectively, they published remastered versions of Commandos 2: Men of Courage and Commandos 3: Destination Berlin for the Nintendo Switch, Xbox One and PlayStation 4 with adapted controls for the consoles' gamepads.

== Mods ==
Following the discontinuation of the series by Pyro Studios, a couple of mods have been developed by fans. Commandos: Strike in Narrow Path is a stand-alone expansion for Commandos: Behind Enemy Lines containing 9 missions and was released initially in 2010. Commandos 2: Destination Paris tweaks the gameplay of Commandos 2: Men Of Courage and adds over 100 missions to the base game.

== Book ==
In 2021, the book Boinas Verdes: De Commandos a Pyro Studios, un turbulento viaje del estrellato al olvido (Green Berets: From Commandos to Pyro Studios, a Turbulent Journey from Stardom to Oblivion) was published. This book is only available in Spanish, written by video game specialist Jaume Esteve, and tells the story of the creation of the Pyro Studios, as well as the development of the four installments of the Commandos franchise and other games from the studio. This book focuses particularly on the human difficulties faced by the development team, as well as the partnership with the British company Eidos.

== Reception ==
Aggregate review scores As of July 2025.
Game	Year	GameRankings	Metacritic
Commandos: Behind Enemy Lines	1998	(PC) 81%	–
Commandos: Beyond the Call of Duty	1999	(PC) 79%	–
Commandos 2: Men of Courage	2001	(PC) 85% (PS2) 71% (Xbox) 75%	(PC) 87 (PS2) 67 (Xbox) 67
Commandos 3: Destination Berlin	2003	(PC) 75%	(PC) 72
Commandos: Strike Force	2006	(PC) 64% (PS2) 62% (Xbox) 63%	(PC) 62 (PS2) 58 (Xbox) 62
Commandos: Origins	2025	–	(PC) 72/100
