= Bejo Dohmen =

Actor (b. 1984)

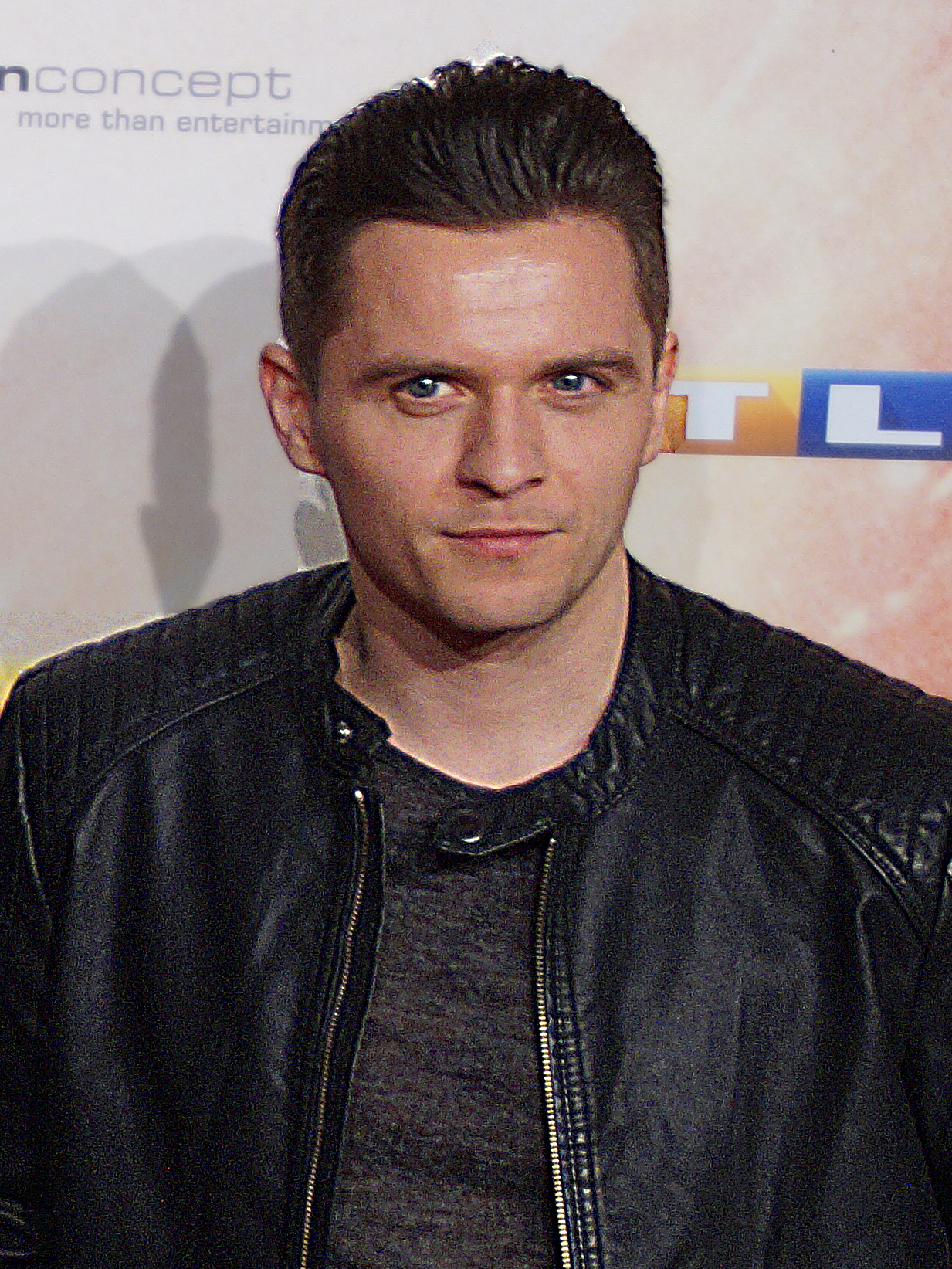
Dohmen in 2016

Bejo Dohmen (born 1984 in Cologne, West Germany) is a German actor.

== Filmography ==
- 2019 Tempo (Facebook Watch Series)
- 2019 Unter Tannen (TV movie)
- 2019 Villa Eva (TV movie)
- 2018 Heldt (TV series)
- 2018 Aisha
- 2018 Darknet
- 2018 Freundinnen – Jetzt erst recht (TV series)
- 2018 Falk (TV series)
- 2018 Unter Tannen (TV series)
- 2018 Ready to Rumble (TV pilot)
- 2018 Kommando 1944
- 2017 True Crime
- 2017 It's your turn honey
- 2014 Pastewka (TV series)
- 2014 Marie Brand und das Mädchen im Ring (TV movie)
- 2014 Alles was zählt (TV series)
- 2013 Cologne P.D. (TV series)
- 2013 Tatort – Melinda (TV movie)
- 2013 Break up man
- 2012 Foreign Deployment (TV movie)
- 2011 Unter uns (TV series)
- 2011 Quirk of Fate

== Awards and nominations ==
| Year | Film / Series | Festival | Category | Result |
|---|---|---|---|---|
| 2018 | Kommando 1944 | The Actors Awards | Best Supporting Actor Best Ensemble | Won, Jury Prize Won, Jury Prize |
| 2018 | Kommando 1944 | Los Angeles Film Awards | Best Supporting Actor Best Ensemble | Won, Jury Award Won, Jury Award |
| 2018 | Kommando 1944 | Malibu Film Festival | Best Actor | Won, Chaplin Short Film Award |
| 2018 | Kommando 1944 | The IndieFest Film Awards | Best Supporting Actor | Won, Award of Excellence |
| 2018 | Kommando 1944 | Oniros Film Awards | Best Actor Best Ensemble | Nominated Nominated |
| 2018 | Kommando 1944 | Asians On Film Festival | Best Ensemble | Won, Honorary Award |
| 2018 | Kommando 1944 | Festigious International Film Festival | Best Ensemble | Won, Jury Prize |
| 2018 | Kommando 1944 | Independent Shorts Awards | Best Ensemble | Won, Platinum Award |
| 2018 | Kommando 1944 | New York Film Awards | Best Ensemble | Won, Jury Prize |
| 2018 | Kommando 1944 | Top Shorts Film Festival | Best Ensemble | Won, Jury Prize – Special Mention |
| 2013 | Heimat Classics | SMS Self Made Shorty | Special: Team Award | Won |
