= Commandos 3: Destination Berlin =

2003 video game

- Developer: Pyro Studios (Note: Ported to Mac OS X by Zonic. Remastered version developed by Raylight Games.)
- Publisher: Eidos Interactive (Note: Mac OS X version published by Feral Interactive. Remastered version published by Kalypso Media.)
- Designer: Ignacio Pérez Dolset
- Series: Commandos
- Platforms: Windows; Mac OS X Nintendo Switch; PlayStation 4 Xbox One
- Release: October 14, 2003: Windows; NA: October 14, 2003; EU: October 24, 2003; AU: October 31, 2003; Mac OS X; WW: June 3, 2005; HD Remaster; Windows, Switch, PS4, Xbox One; WW: August 30, 2022
- Genre: Real-time tactics
- Modes: Single-player, multiplayer

Commandos 3: Destination Berlin is a real-time tactics video game and the third installment in the Commandos series. It was developed by Pyro Studios and published by Eidos Interactive in October 2003 for Windows, with a Mac OS X port released in June 2005 via publisher Feral Interactive. The game is the first in the series to use a true 3D engine as well as introduce deathmatch multiplayer mode.

A remaster of the game was released in August 2022 for Windows, Nintendo Switch, PlayStation 4, and Xbox One.

== Gameplay ==
The player controls a group of commandos that are used to complete missions. Destination Berlin marks the first installment in the Commandos series not to feature the Driver, who was part of the original Commandos team. Natasha (aka "Lips"), who was introduced in Commandos: Beyond the Call of Duty, is also absent. The only available Commandos characters are the Green Beret, the Sniper, the Marine, the Sapper, the Spy, and the Thief.

The gameplay is largely similar to the previous games, allowing the player to see all enemies on the map and using a "point and click" control scheme, but it has fewer hotkeys compared to the previous installment, and the user must press buttons on the action bar.

Gameplay experience and strategy differ from the previous games in the addition of an assault rifle, a weapon less powerful than a rifle but more powerful than a pistol. Additionally, all units can use weapons such as grenades, rather than just the Sapper as in previous games.

The previous "knapsack" set-up, simply showing a picture of all the items the currently selected commando has in his possession, has been abandoned in favor of a "box" system. When searching enemy bodies or supply crates, a smaller box is shown for their capacity. Commandos such as the Green Beret or Spy, who were only armed with pistols in previous installments, can now use all small arms except for the sniper rifle.

The new "cover mode" ability allows the player to leave Commandos waiting at a door or behind cover, ready to shoot at any enemy that comes within range, often more accurately than when controlled manually. This gives the option of ambushes and more defensive tactics.

Commandos 3 is broken down into three campaigns: Central Europe, Normandy, and Stalingrad. Each campaign uses different characters. Most missions are on a time limit.

== Plot ==
The tutorial begins with Jack O'Hara clearing out a bunker, Sir Francis T. Woolridge killing a few German soldiers with his sniper rifle and Thomas Hancock destroying a Panzer III tank with explosives. The game then shifts to 21 February 1939, where René Duchamp and Paul Toledo infiltrate the German Embassy in London and steal documents from a safe.

In the Battle of Stalingrad, Woolridge kills an elite German sniper, lifting the siege of a Soviet command post at the Barmaley Fountain. General Franklin O'Donnell then arrives for a meeting with Soviet personnel, accompanied by Hancock and O'Hara. A massive German airstrike ensues followed by airdrops of the Fallschirmjäger. In an effort to protect the General, the commandos repulse waves of infantry attacks including a 7.5 cm Pak 40 anti-tank gun. When the meeting ends, O'Donnell crosses behind German lines and boards a Junkers Ju 52, much to the commandos' confusion. When they too enter the aircraft, O'Donnell orders the Germans to arrest them.

While in an underground prison cell, O'Hara subdues a jail guard and frees Woolridge and Hancock, telling them of O'Donnell's betrayal. When they make their way through the sewers, they run into René Duchamp, who informs them that O'Donnell plans to reveal top-secret information to the Germans. Unknown to the three, Duchamp tells them they are in Berlin. The player is given three tactical ways to kill O'Donnell before a timer initiates, after which he would appear. After O'Donnell's assassination, the four commandos enter a Kübelwagen and escape the capital.

In Saint-Avold, René Duchamp and Paul Toledo board an armoured train carrying stolen artwork but are discovered. The Germans warn the next station and they try to derail the train using explosives. Jack O'Hara discovers this and single-handedly clears the area before boarding the train just as it passes. Together with Duchamp and Toledo, the three take control of the train. The Germans, however, destroy an upcoming railroad bridge, forcing O'Hara to stop the locomotive. Duchamp and Toledo are captured and loaded onto a truck along with the artwork, while O'Hara hides in the back of another truck.

With the German convoy scheduled to pass through a small town in Forbach, Sir Francis T. Woolridge and Thomas Hancock eliminate the town of all German resistance, allowing American soldiers to fortify the area and prepare for their arrival. The convoy arrives escorted by Tiger I tanks but is ambushed as they enter the town. The trucks carrying Duchamp and Toledo are freed and the artwork is recovered.

On June 6, 1944, the night before the Normandy landings, Hancock and Toledo infiltrate a German encampment serving as reinforcements near Caen. They destroy a fuel depot, munitions building and as many Tiger I tanks, Schwerer Panzerspähwagen armored cars and Sd.Kfz. 251 half-tracks. At daybreak, James Blackwood infiltrates a port in Le Havre, disabling two German E-boats using mines. As the landings commence, O'Hara joins the Americans as they converge on Omaha Beach. Together, they take out the coastal artillery and clear the bunkers of all German troops.

== Release ==
Commandos 3: Destination Berlin was released for Windows in October 2003 for North American, European, and Australian markets.

Developed by Zonic, a Mac OS X port of the game was released on June 3, 2005, by publisher Feral Interactive along with Commandos 2: Men of Courage as part of the Commandos Battle Pack. Developed by Raylight Games, a remastered version of the game subtitled HD Remaster was released on August 30, 2022, via publisher Kalypso Media for Windows, Nintendo Switch, PlayStation 4, and Xbox One.

== Reception ==
Reception

Aggregate score
Aggregator	Score
Metacritic	72/100

Review scores
Publication	Score
Computer Games Magazine	1.5/5
Computer Gaming World	2/5
Edge	6/10
Eurogamer	8/10
Game Informer	6/10
GamePro	4/5
GameRevolution	B−
GameSpot	7.9/10
GameSpy	3/5
GameZone	8.9/10
IGN	8.9/10
PC Gamer (US)	78%

Commandos 3 received "average" reviews according to review aggregator website Metacritic. The game was criticized for being difficult to play on account of having fewer hotkeys than its predecessors and being locked at an 800x600 resolution, which was low-end at the time of release.

Commandos 3 received a "Gold" award from the Asociación Española de Distribuidores y Editores de Software de Entretenimiento (aDeSe), for more than 40,000 sales in Spain during its first 12 months.
