= Pyro Studios =

Spanish video game developer

Pyro Mobile
- Company type: Private company
- Industry: Interactive entertainment
- Predecessor: Pyro Studios; Play Wireless
- Founded: 1996; 30 years ago
- Defunct: 2017
- Headquarters: Alcobendas, Spain
- Key people: Carlos Gonzálvez (general director)
- Products: Commandos series
- Owner: Zed
- Parent: Zed Group

Pyro Mobile was a video game developer based in Madrid, Spain, established in 2012 as a merger between Play Wireless and Pyro Studios and eventually ceasing operations in the second half of 2017. It is mostly known for its real-time tactics games series, Commandos.

== Pyro Studios ==
Pyro Studios was founded in 1996 with the purpose of developing quality video games. The result of this commitment was the development of Commandos: Behind Enemy Lines, which was released in 1998 and became the decade's most successful Spanish game. Gonzo Suárez, who had previously worked at Opera Soft, conceived the real-time tactics series. The success of this title led to the release of a disk containing new missions entitled Commandos: Beyond the Call of Duty.

In October 2001, the Microsoft Windows version of Commandos 2: Men of Courage was launched, followed by its release on Microsoft Xbox and Sony PlayStation 2, in September 2002. Commandos 3: Destination Berlin was released in October 2003. In total, the Commandos series has sold more than 5 million copies worldwide.

Praetorians, a 3D strategy game for Windows set at the time of Julius Caesar's campaigns, was released in February 2003.

Imperial Glory was released at the beginning of 2005. The game received "average" reviews.

Commandos: Strike Force released during the first months of 2006. The game received "mixed" reviews and sold poorly.

In late 2008, the studio cancelled an Xbox 360 and PS3 game named Cops, laying off 30 employees. For its sister company's film Planet 51, Pyro developed the console version of the game, released in November 2009.

== Pyro Mobile ==
In 2012, Pyro Studios merged with Play Wireless, establishing Pyro Mobile, a company to develop applications for smartphones, tablets and social media. Its first mobile game, The Moleys, was released in December 2012.

== Games ==
- Commandos: Behind Enemy Lines (1998)
- Commandos: Beyond the Call of Duty (1999)
- Commandos 2: Men of Courage (2001)
- Praetorians (2003)
- Commandos 3: Destination Berlin (2003)
- Imperial Glory (2005)
- Commandos: Strike Force (2006)
- Planet 51: The Game (2009)
