= List of Games for Windows titles =

This is a list of Games for Windows titles: video games under Microsoft's Games for Windows label. With the closure of the Xbox.com PC marketplace in August 2013, no games were developed for the platform past 2013. The clients software and the servers are still available.

== Released ==
This list contains 251 game titles on this list. (Note: This number is always up to date by this script.)

=== 2006 ===
Title	Release date	Developer	Publisher	LIVE	Games on Demand
Age of Empires III: The WarChiefs	2006-10-17	Ensemble Studios	Microsoft Game Studios	✗	✗
Company of Heroes	2006-09-14	Relic Entertainment	THQ	✗	✗
Lego Star Wars II: The Original Trilogy	2006-09-11	Traveller's Tales Ltd.	LucasArts	✗	✗
Microsoft Flight Simulator X: Deluxe Edition	2006-10-10	Aces Studio	Microsoft Game Studios	✗	✗
Microsoft Flight Simulator X: Standard Edition	2006-10-10	Aces Studio	Microsoft Game Studios	✗	✗
Zoo Tycoon 2: Marine Mania	2006-10-17	Blue Fang Games	Microsoft Game Studios	✗	✗
Zoo Tycoon 2: Zookeeper Collection	2006-10-01	Blue Fang Games	Microsoft Game Studios	✗	✗

=== 2007 ===
Title	Release date	Developer	Publisher	LIVE	Games on Demand
Age of Empires III: Gold Edition	2007-10-23	Ensemble Studios	Microsoft Game Studios	✗	✗
Age of Empires III: The Asian Dynasties	2007-10-23	Ensemble Studios	Microsoft Game Studios	✗	✗
Bee Movie Game	2007-10-30	Beenox	Activision	✗	✗
BioShock	2007-08-21	Irrational Games	2K	✗	✓
Clive Barker's Jericho	2007-10-23	MercurySteam	Codemasters	✗	✗
Company of Heroes: Opposing Fronts	2007-09-24	Relic Entertainment	THQ	✗	✗
Crysis	2007-11-15	Crytek	Electronic Arts	✗	✓
Disney-Pixar's Ratatouille	2007-06-26	Heavy Iron Studios	THQ	✗	✗
Empire Earth III	2007-11-06	Rockstar New England	Vivendi	✗	✗
Football Manager 2008	2007-10-26	Sports Interactive	Sega	✗	✗
Gears of War	2007-11-06	People Can Fly	Microsoft Game Studios	✓	✓
Halo 2 for Windows Vista	2007-05-31	Hired Gun	Microsoft Game Studios	✓	✗
Hellgate: London	2007-10-31	Flagship Studios	Electronic Arts	✗	✗
John Woo Presents Stranglehold	2007-09-18	Midway Chicago	Midway Games	✗	✗
Juiced 2: Hot Import Nights	2007-11-16	THQ Digital Studios UK	THQ	✓	✓
Kane & Lynch: Dead Men	2007-11-20	IO Interactive	Eidos Interactive	✓	✓
Lara Croft Tomb Raider: Anniversary	2007-06-01	Crystal Dynamics	Eidos Interactive	✗	✓
Lost Planet: Extreme Condition	2007-06-26	Capcom	Capcom	✗	✗
Microsoft Flight Simulator X: Acceleration	2007-10-23	Aces Studio	Microsoft Game Studios	✗	✗
Monster Madness: Battle for Suburbia	2007-05-15	Artificial Studios	SouthPeak Games	✗	✗
My Horse and Me	2007-11-30	W!Games	Atari	✗	✗
Rail Simulator	2007-10-05	Kuju Entertainment	Electronic Arts	✗	✗
Sega Rally Revo	2007-09-28	Sega Racing Studio	Sega	✗	✗
Shadowrun	2007-05-29	FASA Studio	Microsoft Game Studios	✓ (Windows and Xbox 360)	✓
Sid Meier's Civilization IV: Beyond the Sword	2007-07-18	Firaxis Games	2K	✗	✗
Sid Meier's Civilization IV: Gold Edition	2007-07-17	Firaxis Games	2K	✗	✗
Spider-Man: Friend or Foe	2007-10-02	Beenox	Activision	✗	✗
Star Wars: Empire at War - Gold Pack	2007-09-14	Petroglyph	LucasArts	✗	✗
Supreme Commander	2007-02-20	Gas Powered Games	THQ	✗	✓
Supreme Commander: Forged Alliance	2007-11-06	Gas Powered Games	THQ	✗	✓
The Lord of the Rings Online: Shadows of Angmar	2007-04-24	Turbine, Inc.	Turbine, Inc. Midway Games; Codemasters	✗	✗
The Settlers: Rise of an Empire	2007-09-25	Blue Byte	Ubisoft	✗	✗
The Witcher	2007-10-26	CD Projekt	Atari	✗	✗
Thrillville: Off the Rails	2007-10-23	Frontier Developments	LucasArts	✗	✗
Two Worlds	2007-08-24	Reality Pump Studios	SouthPeak Games	✗	✗
Universe at War: Earth Assault	2007-12-12	Petroglyph Games	Sega	✓ (Windows and Xbox 360)	✓
Viva Piñata for Windows	2007-11-06	Rare	Microsoft Game Studios	✓	✓
World in Conflict	2007-09-18	Massive Entertainment	Sierra	✗	✗
Zoo Tycoon 2: Extinct Animals	2007-10-15	Blue Fang Games	Microsoft Game Studios	✗	✗

=== 2008 ===
Title	Release date	Developer	Publisher	LIVE	Games on Demand
007: Quantum of Solace	2008-11-04	Beenox	Activision	✓	✗
Age of Conan: Hyborian Adventures	2008-05-20	Funcom	Funcom	✗	✗
Alone in the Dark	2008-06-24	Eden Games	Atari	✗	✗
Beijing 2008 - The Official Video Game of the Olympic Games	2008-08-05	Eurocom	Sega	✗	✗
Call of Duty: World at War	2008-11-11	Treyarch	Activision	✗	✓
Conflict: Denied Ops	2008-02-12	Pivotal Games	Eidos Interactive	✗	✓
Crysis Warhead	2008-09-16	Crytek	Electronic Arts	✗	✗
Deer Hunter Tournament	2008-10-14	SouthLogic Studios	Atari	✗	✗
Devil May Cry 4	2008-07-08	Capcom	Capcom	✗	✗
Fallout 3	2008-10-28	Bethesda Game Studios	Bethesda Softworks	✓	✓
FlatOut: Ultimate Carnage	2008-08-01	Bugbear Entertainment	Empire Interactive	✓	✓
Football Manager 2009	2008-11-14	Sports Interactive	Sega	✗	✗
Frontlines: Fuel of War	2008-02-12	Kaos Studios	THQ	✗	✗
Grand Theft Auto IV	2008-12-02	Rockstar Toronto	Rockstar Games	✓	✓
Hour of Victory	2008-02-15	N-Fusion Interactive	Midway Games	✓	✗
Kung Fu Panda	2008-05-27	Beenox	Activision	✗	✗
Lara Croft Tomb Raider: Underworld	2008-11-18	Crystal Dynamics	Eidos Interactive	✗	✓
Legend of the Galactic Heroes	2008-10-16 JP	Namco Bandai Games	Namco Bandai Games	✓	✗
Legendary	2008-11-18	Spark Unlimited	Gamecock Media Group	✗	✗
Lego Batman: The Videogame	2008-09-23	Traveller's Tales	Warner Bros. Interactive Entertainment	✗	✓
Lego Indiana Jones: The Original Adventures	2008-06-03	Traveller's Tales	LucasArts	✗	✗
Lost Planet: Extreme Condition - Colonies Edition	2008-05-27	Capcom	Capcom	✓ (Windows and Xbox 360)	✓
Madagascar: Escape 2 Africa	2008-11-04	Papaya Studio	Activision	✗	✗
Microsoft Flight Simulator X: Gold Edition	2008-09-23	Aces Studio	Microsoft Game Studios	✗	✓
Race Driver: Grid	2008-06-03	Codemasters	Codemasters	✗	✗
Sacred 2: Fallen Angel	2008-11-07	Ascaron	Deep Silver	✗	✗
Sid Meier's Civilization IV: Colonization	2008-09-23	Firaxis Games	2K	✗	✗
Sins of a Solar Empire	2008-02-04	Ironclad Games	Stardock	✗	✗
Space Siege	2008-08-12	Gas Powered Games	Sega	✗	✗
Spider-Man: Web of Shadows	2008-10-21	Shaba Games; Treyarch	Activision	✗	✗
The Club	2008-02-19	Bizarre Creations	Sega	✓	✓
The Lord of the Rings Online: Mines of Moria	2008-11-18	Turbine, Inc.	Midway Games; Codemasters	✗	✗
The Witcher: Enhanced Edition	2008-09-16	CD Projekt	Atari	✗	✗
Turning Point: Fall of Liberty	2008-02-26	Spark Unlimited	Codemasters	✗	✗
WALL-E	2008-06-24	Heavy Iron Studios	THQ	✗	✗
Warhammer: Mark of Chaos - Battle March	2008-09-16	Black Hole Entertainment	Namco Bandai Games; Deep Silver	✗	✗
Zoo Tycoon 2: Ultimate Collection	2008-09-30	Blue Fang Games	Microsoft Game Studios	✗	✓

=== 2009 ===
Title	Release date	Developer	Publisher	LIVE	Games on Demand
Age of Empires III: Complete Collection	2009-09-15	Ensemble Studios	Microsoft Game Studios	✗	✓
Batman: Arkham Asylum	2009-09-15	Rocksteady Studios	Eidos Interactive	✓	✓
Battlestations: Pacific	2009-05-12	Eidos Interactive	Eidos Interactive	✓	✓
Bionic Commando	2009-06-28	Capcom	Capcom	✗	✗
BioShock (part of BioShock & Oblivion Double Pack	2009-07-07	Irrational Games	2K	✗	✓
Championship Manager 2010	2009-09-11 EU	Beautiful Game Studios	Eidos Interactive	✗	✓
Codename: Panzers – Cold War	2009-03-10	StormRegion	Atari	✗	✗
Colin McRae: Dirt 2	2009-12-01	Codemasters	Codemasters	✓	✓
Company of Heroes: Tales of Valor	2009-04-09	Relic Entertainment	THQ	✗	✗
Demigod	2009-04-14	Gas Powered Games	Stardock	✗	✗
East India Company	2009-08-14	Nitro Games	Paradox Interactive	✗	✗
Elven Legacy	2009-04-07	1C Company	Paradox Interactive	✗	✗
Empire: Total War	2009-03-03	The Creative Assembly	Sega	✗	✗
F.E.A.R. 2: Project Origin	2009-02-10	Monolith Productions	Warner Bros. Interactive Entertainment	✗	✓
Fallout 3: Game of the Year Edition	2009-10-13	Bethesda Game Studios	Bethesda Softworks	✓	✗
Football Manager 2010	2009-10-30 EU	Sports Interactive	Sega	✗	✓
Fuel	2009-06-30	Asobo Studio	Codemasters	✓	✓
Grand Ages: Rome	2009-03-17	Haemimont Games	Kalypso Media	✗	✗
Ice Age: Dawn of the Dinosaurs	2009-06-30	Eurocom	Activision	✗	✗
Lego Indiana Jones 2: The Adventure Continues	2009-11-17	Traveller's Tales	LucasArts	✗	✗
Mahjong Tales: Ancient Wisdom	2009-12-22	Creat Studios; TikGames	TikGames; Creat Studios; Microsoft Game Studios	✓	✓
Majesty 2: The Fantasy Kingdom Sim	2009-09-11	1C Company	Paradox Interactive	✗	✗
Microsoft Tinker	2009-12-15	Fuel Industries	Microsoft Game Studios	✓	✓
Mini Ninjas	2009-09-08	IO Interactive	Eidos Interactive	✗	✓
MLB Front Office Manager	2009-01-26	Capcom Vancouver	2K Sports	✗	✗
Monsters vs. Aliens	2009-03-24	Beenox	Activision	✗	✗
Osmos	2009-12-22	Hemisphere Games	Hemisphere Games; Microsoft Game Studios	✓ (G.o.D only)	✓
PLAY! Volume 2	2009-10-22	Viva Media	Viva Media	✗	✗
Pro Evolution Soccer 2010	2009-10-23 EU	Konami	Konami	✗	✗
Prototype	2009-06-15	Radical Entertainment	Activision	✗	✓
Red Faction: Guerrilla	2009-09-15	Volition	THQ	✓	✓
Resident Evil 5	2009-09-15	Capcom	Capcom	✓	✓
Risen	2009-10-02	Piranha Bytes	Deep Silver	✗	✗
Rogue Warrior	2009-12-01	Rebellion Developments	Bethesda Softworks	✗	✗
Section 8	2009-09-04	TimeGate Studios	SouthPeak Games	✓	✓
Serious Sam HD: The First Encounter	2009-10-24	Croteam	Devolver Digital	✗	✗
Shellshock 2: Blood Trails	2009-02-10	Rebellion Developments	Eidos Interactive	✗	✗
Star Wars: The Clone Wars – Republic Heroes	2009-10-06	Krome Studios	LucasArts	✓	✗
Stormrise	2009-03-24	The Creative Assembly	Sega	✓	✓
Street Fighter IV	2009-07-07	Capcom	Capcom	✓	✓
Supreme Ruler 2020: Gold Edition	2009-09-15	Paradox Interactive	Paradox Interactive	✗	✗
The Last Remnant	2009-04-09	Square Enix	Square Enix	✗	✗
Transformers: Revenge of the Fallen	2009-06-15	Luxoflux	Activision	✗	✗
Tropico 3	2009-10-16	Haemimont Games	Kalypso Media	✗	✗
Warhammer 40,000: Dawn of War II	2009-02-19	Relic Entertainment	THQ	✓	✓
Where’s Waldo? The Fantastic Journey	2009-12-22	Ludia	Ludia; Ubisoft; Microsoft Game Studios	✓	✓
Wolfenstein	2009-08-18	Raven Software	Activision	✗	✗
World of Goo	2009-12-22	2D Boy	2D Boy; Microsoft Game Studios	✓ (G.o.D only)	✓
X-Blades	2009-02-10	Gaijin Entertainment	SouthPeak Games; TopWare Interactive	✗	✗
X-Men Origins: Wolverine	2009-05-01	Raven Software	Activision	✗	✗

=== 2010 ===
Title	Release date	Developer	Publisher	LIVE	Games on Demand
3D Hunting 2010	2010-04-20	Kalypso Media	Kalypso Media	✗	✗
Age Of Conan: Rise of the Godslayer	2010-05-11	Funcom	Funcom	✗	✗
Aliens vs. Predator	2010-02-16	Rebellion Developments	Sega	✗	✗
Alpha Protocol	2010-06-01	Obsidian Entertainment	Sega	✗	✓
Alter Ego	2010-08-03	Viva Media	Viva Media	✗	✗
Batman: Arkham Asylum – Game of the Year Edition	2010-05-11	Rocksteady Studios	Eidos Interactive	✓	✓
BioShock 2	2010-02-09	2K Marin	2K	✓	✓
BioShock 2 (Russian version)	2010-06-18 RU	2K Marin	1C Company	✓	✗
Blacklight: Tango Down	2010-07-14	Zombie Studios	UTV Ignition Entertainment	✓	✓
BlazBlue: Calamity Trigger	2010-09-02	Arc System Works	Arc System Works	✓ (Windows and Xbox 360)	✓
CarneyVale: Showtime	2010-11-15	Singapore-MIT GAMBIT Game Lab	Singapore-MIT GAMBIT Game Lab; Microsoft Game Studios	✓	✓
Crash Time 4: The Syndicate	2010-12-?? DE; 2012-04-27 UK	Synetic GmbH	dtp entertainment AG; PQube	✓	✗
Dark Void	2010-01-19	Airtight Games	Capcom	✓ (G.o.D only)	✓
Dead Rising 2	2010-09-28	Capcom Vancouver	Capcom	✓	✓
Demolition Company	2010-12-21	Giants Software	Astragon	✗	✗
Disciples III: Renaissance	2010-07-13	Akella	Kalypso Media	✗	✗
Elemental: War of Magic	2010-08-24	Stardock	Stardock	✗	✗
Empire & Napoleon Total War – Game of the Year Edition	2010-10-01	The Creative Assembly	Sega	✗	✗
F1 2010	2010-09-22	Codemasters	Codemasters	✓	✓
Fallout: New Vegas	2010-10-19	Obsidian Entertainment	Bethesda Softworks	✗	✗
Farming Simulator 2011	2010-10-18	Giants Software	Astragon	✗	✗
Game Room	2010-03-24	Krome Studios	Microsoft Game Studios	✓ (Windows and Xbox 360)	✓
Grand Ages: Rome - Gold Edition	2010-02-19	Haemimont Games	Kalypso Media	✗	✗
Grand Theft Auto IV: The Complete Edition	2010-11-09	Rockstar Toronto	Rockstar Games	✓	✗
Grand Theft Auto: Episodes from Liberty City	2010-04-13	Rockstar Toronto	Rockstar Games	✓	✓
Just Cause 2	2010-03-23	Avalanche Studios	Eidos Interactive	✗	✓
Lego Harry Potter: Years 1–4	2010-06-29	Traveller's Tales Ltd.	Warner Bros. Interactive Entertainment	✗	✓
Lost Planet 2	2010-10-15	Capcom	Capcom	✓	✓
M.U.D. TV	2010-02-23	Realmforge Studios	Kalypso Media	✗	✗
Metro 2033	2010-03-16	4A Games	THQ	✗	✗
Napoleon: Total War	2010-02-26	The Creative Assembly	Sega	✗	✗
Napoleon: Total War – Imperial Edition	2010-02-25	The Creative Assembly	Sega	✗	✗
Patrician IV	2010-09-17	Gaming Minds Studios	Kalypso Media	✗	✓
Pro Evolution Soccer 2011	2010-10-20 EU	Konami	Konami	✗	✗
Reload: Target Down	2010-11-09	Mastiff	Mastiff	✗	✗
Sid Meier's Civilization IV: The Complete Edition	2010-06-08	Firaxis Games	2K	✗	✓
Sins of a Solar Empire: Trinity Pack	2010-02-09	Ironclad Games	Stardock	✗	✗
Spider-Man: Shattered Dimensions	2010-11-25	Beenox	Activision	✗	✗
Star Wars: The Force Unleashed II	2010-10-26	Aspyr Media	LucasArts	✗	✗
Tron: Evolution	2010-12-07	GameStar	Disney Interactive Studios	✓	✓
Tropico 3: Absolute Power	2010-05-17	Haemimont Games	Kalypso Media	✗	✗
Tropico 3: Gold Edition	2010-10-05	Haemimont Games	Kalypso Media	✗	✓
Vancouver 2010	2010-01-12	Eurocom	Sega	✓	✓
Warhammer 40,000: Dawn of War II – Chaos Rising	2010-03-11	Relic Entertainment	THQ	✓	✓
Warhammer 40,000: Dawn of War II – Gold Edition	2010-03-11	Relic Entertainment	THQ	✓	✗

=== 2011 ===
Title	Release date	Developer	Publisher	LIVE	Games on Demand
Age of Empires Online	2011-08-16	Robot Entertainment; Gas Powered Games	Microsoft Game Studios	✓	✓
Airline Tycoon 2	2011-10-14	B-Alive	Kalypso Media	✗	✗
Batman: Arkham City	2011-11-22	Rocksteady Studios	Warner Bros. Interactive Entertainment	✓	✓
Battle vs. Chess	2011-05-17 EU	TopWare Interactive	SouthPeak Games	✓	✗
Black Mirror II: Reigning Evil	2011-02-08	Viva Media	Viva Media	✗	✗
Black Mirror III: The Final Fear	2011-02-14	Viva Media	Viva Media	✗	✗
Brink	2011-05-10	Splash Damage	Bethesda Softworks	✗	✗
Bulletstorm	2011-02-22	People Can Fly/Epic Games	Electronic Arts	✓	✓
Cargo: The Quest for Gravity	2011-04-21	Ice-Pick Lodge	Viva Media	✗	✗
Chronicles of Shakespeare: Romeo and Juliet	2011-03-16	Viva Media	Viva Media	✗	✗
Dancing Craze: Bonus Edition	2011-11-18	Alawar Entertainment	Viva Media	✗	✗
Dead Rising 2: Off the Record	2011-10-11	Capcom Vancouver	Capcom	✓	✓
DiRT 3	2011-05-24	Codemasters	Codemasters	✓	✓
Disciples III: Resurrection	2011-10-07	Akella	Kalypso Media	✗	✗
Dungeons	2011-02-12	Realmforge Studios	Kalypso Media	✗	✓
Dungeons: The Dark Lord	2011-09-23	Realmforge Studios	Kalypso Media	✗	✗
Edna & Harvey: The Breakout	2011-02-08	Viva Media	Viva Media	✗	✗
Exorcist	2011-01-03	Viva Media	Viva Media	✗	✗
F1 2011	2011-09-23	Codemasters	Codemasters	✓	✓
Fable III	2011-05-17	Lionhead Studios	Microsoft Game Studios	✓	✓
Gotham City Impostors (Beta)	2011-10-05	Monolith Productions	Warner Bros. Interactive Entertainment	✓	✗
Gray Matter	2011-02-22	Viva Media	Viva Media	✗	✗
Hunted: The Demon's Forge	2011-05-31	inXile Entertainment	Bethesda Softworks	✗	✓
Lego Harry Potter: Years 5–7	2011-11-11	Traveller's Tales	Warner Bros. Interactive Entertainment	✗	✗
Lego Pirates of the Caribbean: The Video Game	2011-05-24	Traveller's Tales	Disney Interactive Studios	✗	✓
Lego Star Wars III: The Clone Wars	2011-03-22	Traveller's Tales	LucasArts	✗	✗
Operation Flashpoint: Red River	2011-04-21 EU	Codemasters	Codemasters	✓	✓
Patrician IV: Rise of a Dynasty	2011-01-28	Gaming Minds Studios	Kalypso Media	✗	✓
Play! 101 Premium Games Collection - Get Right to the Fun!	2011-08-04	Alawar Games	Viva Media	✗	✗
Pro Evolution Soccer 2012	2011-09-29	Konami	Konami	✗	✗
Rage	2011-10-04	id Software	Bethesda Softworks	✗	✗
Rugby League Live	2011-02-11 AU	Big Ant Studios	Tru Blu Entertainment	✓	✗
Sacra Terra: Angelic Night - Collector's Edition	2011-09-13	Viva Media	Viva Media	✗	✗
Section 8: Prejudice	2011-05-04	TimeGate Studios	TimeGate Studios	✓	✓
Shadow Harvest: Phantom Ops	2011-02-02	Black Lion Studios	Viva Media	✗	✗
Ski Region Simulator 2012	2011-10-21	Giants Software	Astragon	✗	✗
Super Street Fighter IV: Arcade Edition	2011-07-05	QLOC	Capcom	✓	✓
The Elder Scrolls V: Skyrim	2011-11-11	Bethesda Game Studios	Bethesda Softworks	✗	✗
The First Templar	2011-05-10	Haemimont Games	Kalypso Media	✗	✓
The Lord of the Rings: War in the North	2011-11-01	Snowblind Studios	Warner Bros. Interactive Entertainment	✗	✗
Tropico 4	2011-08-30	Haemimont Games	Kalypso Media	✗	✗
Virtua Tennis 4	2011-06-24	Sumo Digital	Sega	✓	✓
Weird Park: Broken Tune - Collector's Edition	2011-08-26	Viva Media	Viva Media	✗	✗

=== 2012 ===
Title	Release date	Developer	Publisher	LIVE	Games on Demand
AFL Live: Game of the Year Edition	2012-06-06 EU	Big Ant Studios	Tru Blu Entertainment; Home Entertainment Suppliers	✓	✓
Batman: Arkham City - Game of the Year Edition	2012-09-07	Rocksteady Studios	Warner Bros. Interactive Entertainment	✓	✗
Choplifter HD	2012-01-11	inXile Entertainment	inXile Entertainment	✗	✗
Crazy Machines Elements	2012-02-14	Viva Media	Viva Media	✗	✗
Dark Souls	2012-08-24	FromSoftware	Namco Bandai Games	✓	✓
DiRT 3: Complete Edition	2012-03-09	Codemasters	Codemasters	✓	✗
Disciples III: Gold Edition	2012-04-13	Akella	Kalypso Media	✗	✗
Dishonored	2012-10-09	Arkane Studios	Bethesda Softworks	✗	✗
Fallout 3 (part of Fallout 3 & Oblivion Double Pack)	2012-04-03	Bethesda Game Studios	Bethesda Softworks	✓	✗
Fallout: New Vegas - Ultimate Edition	2012-02-07	Obsidian Entertainment	Bethesda Softworks	✗	✗
Gotham City Impostors	2012-02-07	Monolith Productions	Warner Bros. Interactive Entertainment	✓	✓
House of 1,000 Doors: Family Secrets - Collector's Edition	2012-01-10	Viva Media	Viva Media	✗	✗
Insanely Twisted Shadow Planet	2012-04-17	Shadow Planet Productions	Microsoft Studios	✓	✓
Iron Brigade	2012-08-13	Double Fine Productions	Microsoft Studios	✓	✗
Lego Batman 2: DC Super Heroes	2012-06-19	Traveller's Tales	Warner Bros. Interactive Entertainment	✗	✗
Microsoft Flight	2012-02-27	Microsoft Flight Development Team	Microsoft Studios	✓	✓
Mortal Kombat Arcade Kollection	2012-02-01	NetherRealm Studios; Other Ocean Interactive	Warner Bros. Interactive Entertainment	✓	✓
Port Royale 3: Pirates & Merchants	2012-05-04	Gaming Minds Studios	Kalypso Media	✗	✗
Pro Evolution Soccer 2013	2012-09-20 EU	Konami	Konami	✗	✗
Resident Evil: Operation Raccoon City	2012-05-18	Slant Six Games	Capcom	✓	✓
Street Fighter X Tekken	2012-05-11	QLOC	Capcom	✓	✓
Test Drive: Ferrari Racing Legends	2012-12-10	Slightly Mad Studios	Atari; Evolved Games (PC)	✓	✓
Toy Soldiers	2012-04-27	Signal Studios	Microsoft Studios	✓	✓
Tropico 4: Gold Edition	2012-11-22	Haemimont Games	Kalypso Media	✗	✗
Tropico 4: Modern Times	2012-04-03	Haemimont Games	Kalypso Media	✗	✗

=== 2013 ===
Title	Release date	Developer	Publisher	LIVE	Games on Demand
Ace Combat: Assault Horizon – Enhanced Edition	2013-01-25	Project Aces	Namco Bandai Games	✓	✓
Age of Barbarian: Arena	2013-06-18	Crian Soft	Crian Soft	✗	✗
Armageddon	2013-10-11	Crian Soft	Crian Soft	✗	✗
Dishonored: Game of the Year Edition	2013-10-08	Arkane Studios	Bethesda Softworks	✗	✗
Ms. Splosion Man	2013-04-03	Twisted Pixel Games	Microsoft Studios	✓	✓

== See also ==
- Games for Windows
- Games for Windows – Live
- List of Games for Windows – Live titles
- List of Windows Games on Demand
- Live Anywhere
