= List of Games for Windows – Live titles =

This is a sorted by release date and name list of Games for Windows – Live titles; 73 (including released and former) video games under Microsoft's Games for Windows – Live platform, which include online gaming features. Two common features in all listed games are friends and achievements. With the closure of the Games for Windows Marketplace, none of these games are available for purchase on demand from that store anymore, but the client software and the servers are still available.

== Games ==
| Title | Publisher | Release date |
|---|---|---|
| 007: Quantum of Solace | Activision | 2008-11-04 |
| AFL Live | Home Entertainment Suppliers; Tru Blu Entertainment | 2012-06-06 EU |
| Age of Empires Online | Microsoft Game Studios | 2011-08-16 |
| Battlestations: Pacific | Eidos Interactive | 2009-05-12 |
| BioShock 2 (Russia) | 1C Company; 2K Games | 2010-06-18 RU |
| Blacklight: Tango Down | Ignition Entertainment | 2010-07-14 |
| Bulletstorm | Electronic Arts | 2011-02-22 |
| CarneyVale: Showtime | Singapore-MIT GAMBIT Game Lab; Microsoft Game Studios | 2010-11-12 |
| Crash Time 4: The Syndicate | dtp entertainment AG | 2010-11-26 |
| DiRT 2 | Codemasters | 2009-12-01 |
| F1 2010 | Codemasters | 2010-09-22 |
| F1 2011 | Codemasters | 2011-09-20 |
| Fable III | Microsoft Game Studios | 2011-05-17 |
| FUEL | Codemasters | 2009-06-30 |
| Game Room | Microsoft Game Studios | 2010-03-24 |
| Gears of War | Microsoft Game Studios | 2007-11-06 |
| Halo 2 | Microsoft Game Studios | 2007-05-31 |
| Hour of Victory | Midway Games | 2008-02-15 |
| Juiced 2: Hot Import Nights | THQ | 2007-11-16 |
| Kane & Lynch: Dead Men | Eidos Interactive | 2007-11-20 |
| Legend of the Galactic Heroes | Namco Bandai Games | 2008-10-16 JP |
| Lost Planet: Extreme Condition Colonies Edition | Capcom | 2008-05-27 |
| Lost Planet 2 | Capcom | 2010-10-12 |
| Mahjong Wisdom (Note: Games for Windows – LIVE version available only from the Games for Windows Marketplace.) | TikGames; Creat Studios; Microsoft Game Studios | 2009-12-22 |
| Microsoft Flight | Microsoft Studios | 2012-02-29 |
| Mortal Kombat Arcade Kollection | WB Games | 2012-02-01 |
| Operation Flashpoint: Red River | Codemasters | 2011-04-21 EU |
| Resident Evil: Operation Raccoon City | Capcom | 2012-05-18 |
| Rugby League Live | Tru Blu Entertainment | 2011-02-11 AU |
| Section 8 | SouthPeak Games | 2009-09-04 |
| Section 8: Prejudice | TimeGate Studios | 2011-05-04 |
| Shadowrun | Microsoft Game Studios | 2007-05-29 |
| Star Wars: The Clone Wars – Republic Heroes | LucasArts | 2009-10-06 |
| Stormrise | Sega | 2009-03-24 |
| Street Fighter IV | Capcom | 2009-07-07 |
| Street Fighter X Tekken | Capcom | 2012-05-11 |
| Test Drive: Ferrari Racing Legends | Rombax Games | 2012-12-10 |
| The Club | Sega | 2008-02-19 |
| Tinker | Microsoft Game Studios | 2009-12-15 |
| Tron: Evolution | Disney Interactive Studios | 2010-11-26 EU |
| Universe at War: Earth Assault | Sega | 2007-12-12 |
| Vancouver 2010 | Sega | 2010-01-12 |
| Virtua Tennis 4 | Sega | 2011-06-24 |
| Viva Piñata | Microsoft Game Studios | 2007-11-06 |
| Where's Waldo? The Fantastic Journey | Ludia; Ubisoft; Microsoft Game Studios | 2009-12-22 |

== Former games ==
Note: The retail disc and Games on Demand versions of these games still require Games for Windows – Live.

| Title | Publisher | Release date |
|---|---|---|
| Ace Combat: Assault Horizon – Enhanced Edition | Namco Bandai Games | 2013-01-25 |
| Batman: Arkham Asylum | Eidos Interactive | 2009-09-15 |
| Batman: Arkham Asylum – Game of the Year Edition | Eidos Interactive | 2010-03-26 |
| Batman: Arkham City | WB Games | 2011-11-22 |
| Battle vs. Chess | TopWare Interactive | 2011-05-17 |
| BioShock 2 | 2K Games | 2010-02-09 |
| BlazBlue: Calamity Trigger | Arc System Works | 2010-08-20 EU |
| Dark Souls | Namco Bandai Games | 2012-08-24 |
| Dark Void | Capcom | 2010-04-21 |
| Dead Rising 2 | Capcom | 2010-09-24 EU |
| Dead Rising 2: Off the Record | Capcom | 2011-10-11 |
| DiRT 3 | Codemasters | 2011-05-24 |
| Fallout 3 | Bethesda Softworks | 2008-10-28 |
| FlatOut: Ultimate Carnage | Empire Interactive | 2008-08-01 |
| Gotham City Impostors | WB Games | 2012-02-07 |
| Grand Theft Auto IV | Rockstar Games | 2008-12-02 |
| Grand Theft Auto: Episodes from Liberty City (Note: Also available as 2 add-ons (TLaD and TBoGT)) | Rockstar Games | 2010-04-13 |
| Insanely Twisted Shadow Planet | Microsoft Studios | 2012-04-17 |
| Iron Brigade | Microsoft Studios | 2012-08-13 |
| Ms. Splosion Man | Microsoft Studios | 2013-04-03 |
| Osmos | Hemisphere Games; Microsoft Game Studios | 2009-12-22 |
| Red Faction: Guerrilla | THQ | 2009-09-15 |
| Resident Evil 5 | Capcom | 2009-09-15 |
| Super Street Fighter IV: Arcade Edition | Capcom | 2011-07-08 |
| Toy Soldiers | Microsoft Studios | 2012-04-27 |
| Warhammer 40,000: Dawn of War II | THQ | 2009-02-19 |
| Warhammer 40,000: Dawn of War II – Chaos Rising | THQ | 2010-03-11 |
| World of Goo | 2D Boy; Microsoft Game Studios | 2009-12-22 |

== See also ==
- Games for Windows
- Games for Windows – Live
- List of Games for Windows titles
- List of Windows Games on Demand
- Live Anywhere
