= List of Windows Games on Demand =

This is a list of the Windows Games on Demand (225) released Games on Demand for the Windows platform, available on the now closed Games for Windows Marketplace.

== Released ==
Title	Publisher	Release date	Games for Windows	Games on Demand
007: Blood Stone	Activision	2010-11-15	✗	✗
4 Elements	Playrix	2010-11-16	✗	✗
7 Wonders: Treasures of Seven	MumboJumbo	2010-11-16	✗	✗
A Vampyre Story	Strategy First	2010-11-14	✗	✗
Ace Combat: Assault Horizon – Enhanced Edition	Namco Bandai Games	2013-02-25	✗	✗
AFL Live (Note: These titles are not available to accounts outside of Great Britain.)	Tru Blu Entertainment; Home Entertainment Suppliers	2012-06-06	✗	✗
Age of Empires III: Complete Collection	Microsoft Studios	2010-06-08	✗	✗
Age of Empires Online	Microsoft Studios	2011-08-16	✗	✗
Age of Empires Online - Beta	Microsoft Studios	2010-05-05	✗	✗
Alice: Madness Returns	Electronic Arts	2011-06-14	✗	✗
Alpha Protocol	Sega	2010-06-17	✗	✗
Ankh 2	Strategy First	2010-11-14	✗	✗
Ankh 3	Strategy First	2010-11-14	✗	✗
Around the World in 80 Days	Playrix	2011-05-03	✗	✗
Assassin's Creed: Director's Cut	Ubisoft	2010-08-05	✗	✗
Assassin's Creed II	Ubisoft	2010-06-08	✗	✗
Assassin's Creed: Brotherhood	Ubisoft	2011-06-21	✗	✗
Assassin's Creed: Brotherhood Deluxe Edition	Ubisoft	2011-06-21	✗	✗
Batman: Arkham Asylum	WB Games	2009-12-17	✗	✗
Batman: Arkham Asylum – Game of the Year Edition	WB Games	2010-05-11	✗	✗
Batman: Arkham City	WB Games	2010-11-29	✓	✓
Battlefield: Bad Company 2	Electronic Arts	2011-02-22	✗	✗
Battlestations: Midway	Square Enix	2010-11-14	✗	✗
Battlestations: Pacific	Square Enix	2009-12-15	✗	✗
Bejeweled 2	PopCap Games	2010-11-16	✗	✗
Bejeweled 3	PopCap Games	2010-12-07	✗	✗
BioShock	2K Games	2010-07-08	✗	✗
BioShock 2	2K Games	2010-02-09	✗	✗
Blacklight: Tango Down	Ignition Entertainment	2010-07-14	✗	✗
BlazBlue: Calamity Trigger	Arc System Works	2010-08-20	✗	✗
Blur	Activision	2010-11-16	✗	✗
Bookworm	PopCap Games	2010-11-17	✗	✗
Borderlands	2K Games	2010-06-08	✗	✗
BubbleTown	I-Play Games	2010-11-20	✗	✗
Bulletstorm	Electronic Arts	2011-02-22	✗	✗
Bully: Scholarship Edition	Rockstar Games	2010-08-10	✗	✗
Call of Atlantis	Playrix	2011-05-05	✗	✗
Call of Duty: World at War	Activision	2010-11-14	✗	✗
Call of Duty 4: Modern Warfare	Activision	2010-11-13	✗	✗
CarneyVale: Showtime	Microsoft Studios	2010-11-15	✗	✗
Chainz 2: Relinked	MumboJumbo	2010-11-16	✗	✗
Championship Manager 2010 (Note: These titles are not available to accounts outside of Europe.)	Square Enix	2010-07-14	✗	✗
Cities in Motion	Paradox Interactive	2011-03-10	✗	✗
Cities XL 2011	Focus Home Interactive	2011-02-04	✗	✗
Commandos Complete	Kalypso Media	2011-02-17	✗	✗
Conflict: Denied Ops	Square Enix	2011-01-26	✗	✗
Crysis 2	Electronic Arts	2011-03-22	✗	✗
Cubis Gold	Fresh Games	2010-11-16	✗	✗
Cubis Gold 2	Fresh Games	2010-11-16	✗	✗
Dark Souls	Namco Bandai Games	2012-08-28	✗	✗
Dark Void	Capcom	2010-04-21	✗	✗
Darkest Hour: A Hearts of Iron Game	Paradox Interactive	2011-04-05	✗	✗
Darkspore	Electronic Arts	2011-05-04	✗	✗
Dawn of Discovery Gold	Ubisoft	2010-07-23	✗	✗
Dead Rising 2	Capcom	2010-09-28	✗	✗
Dead Rising 2: Off the Record	Capcom	2011-10-11	✗	✗
Dead Space 2	Electronic Arts	2011-02-22	✗	✗
Deus Ex: Game of the Year Edition	Square Enix	2010-09-30	✗	✗
Deus Ex: Invisible War	Square Enix	2010-09-30	✗	✗
Dirt 2	Codemasters	2009-12-15	✗	✗
Dirt 3	Codemasters	2011-05-24	✗	✗
Divinity II: The Dragon Knight Saga	Focus Home Interactive	2011-02-03	✗	✗
Dragon Age: Origins	Electronic Arts	2011-02-22	✗	✗
Dragon Age: Origins – Awakening	Electronic Arts	2011-02-22	✗	✗
Dragon Age II	Electronic Arts	2011-03-08	✗	✗
Dreamcast Collection	Sega	2011-03-08	✗	✗
Dungeons	Kalypso Media	2011-02-14	✗	✗
Elements of War	Kalypso Media	2011-04-15	✗	✗
Europa Universalis III Complete	Paradox Interactive	2011-01-13	✗	✗
Europa Universalis III: Chronicles	Paradox Interactive	2011-03-22	✗	✗
Europa Universalis III: Divine Wind (Note: Requires the base game Europa Universalis III Complete in order to play)	Paradox Interactive	2011-02-03	✗	✗
Europa Universalis III: Heir to the Throne	Paradox Interactive	2011-02-03	✗	✗
F1 2010	Codemasters	2010-09-22	✗	✗
F1 2011	Codemasters	2011-09-26	✗	✗
Faery: Legends of Avalon	Focus Home Interactive	2011-06-21	✗	✗
F.E.A.R. 2: Project Origin	WB Games	2010-07-29	✓	✗
Fable: The Lost Chapters	Microsoft Studios	2010-11-13	✗	✗
Fable III	Microsoft Studios	2011-05-17	✗	✗
Fallout 3	Bethesda Softworks	2009-12-15	✗	✗
Family Feud: Dream Home	iWin, Inc.	2011-04-01	✗	✗
Far Cry 2: Fortune's Edition	Ubisoft	2010-08-26	✗	✗
Fishdom: Spooky Splash	Playrix	2011-08-29	✗	✗
FlatOut: Ultimate Carnage	Strategy First	2010-11-14	✗	✗
Football Manager 2010	Sega	2010-06-25	✗	✗
Football Manager 2011	Sega	2010-11-16	✗	✗
From Dust	Ubisoft	2012-03-22	✗	✗
Fuel	Codemasters	2009-12-15	✗	✗
Game Room	Microsoft Studios	2010-03-24	✗	✗
Gardenscapes	Playrix	2010-11-16	✗	✗
Gears of War	Microsoft Studios	2010-07-08	✗	✗
Gotham City Impostors	WB Games	2012-02-16	✗	✗
Grand Theft Auto III	Rockstar Games	2010-11-16	✗	✗
Grand Theft Auto IV	Rockstar Games	2010-02-25	✗	✗
Grand Theft Auto: Episodes from Liberty City	Rockstar Games	2010-04-13	✗	✗
Grand Theft Auto: San Andreas	Rockstar Games	2010-06-08	✗	✗
Grand Theft Auto: Vice City	Rockstar Games	2010-08-10	✗	✗
Harry Potter and the Deathly Hallows – Part 2	Electronic Arts	2011-07-14	✗	✗
Hearts of Iron 3	Paradox Interactive	2011-01-13	✗	✗
Hitman: Blood Money	Square Enix	2010-10-07	✗	✗
Hitman 2: Silent Assassin	Square Enix	2010-11-14	✗	✗
Hunted: The Demon's Forge	Bethesda Softworks	2011-07-20	✗	✗
Insanely Twisted Shadow Planet	Microsoft Studios	2012-04-17	✗	✗
Jewel Quest 5	iWin, Inc.	2010-11-16	✗	✗
Juiced 2: Hot Import Nights	THQ	2009-12-15	✗	✗
Kane & Lynch: Dead Men	Square Enix	2009-12-15	✗	✗
King Arthur Collection	Paradox Interactive	2011-06-30	✗	✗
King Arthur: The Role-playing Wargame	Paradox Interactive	2011-01-13	✗	✗
King Arthur: The Role-playing Wargame – The Druids (Note: Requires the base game King Arthur: The Role-playing Wargame in order to play)	Paradox Interactive	2011-03-03	✗	✗
King Arthur: The Role-playing Wargame – The Saxons	Paradox Interactive	2011-03-03	✗	✗
King's Bounty: Platinum Edition	1C Company	2011-05-10	✗	✗
Kona's Crate	indiePub	2011-08-10	✗	✗
Lego Batman: The Videogame	WB Games	2010-06-29	✗	✗
Lego Harry Potter: Years 1–4	WB Games	2010-06-29	✗	✗
Lego Pirates of the Caribbean: The Video Game	Disney Interactive Studios	2011-06-09	✗	✗
Lego Universe	WB Games	2010-11-01	✗	✗
Lost Planet: Extreme Condition Colonies Edition	Capcom	2010-02-23	✗	✗
Lost Planet 2	Capcom	2010-10-15	✗	✗
Mahjong Wisdom	Microsoft Studios	2009-12-22	✗	✗
Mahjongg Dimensions	Arkadium	2010-11-16	✗	✗
Mass Effect 2	Electronic Arts	2011-04-07	✗	✗
Max Payne	Rockstar Games	2010-07-08	✗	✗
Max Payne 2	Rockstar Games	2010-06-08	✗	✗
Medal of Honor	Electronic Arts	2011-02-22	✗	✗
Microsoft Flight	Microsoft Studios	2012-02-26	✗	✗
Microsoft Flight Simulator X - Gold Edition	Microsoft Studios	2011-01-06	✗	✗
Mini Ninjas	Square Enix	2010-11-14	✗	✗
Mortal Kombat Arcade Kollection	WB Games	2012-02-02	✗	✗
Mount&Blade: Warband	Paradox Interactive	2011-01-13	✗	✗
Mount&Blade: With Fire & Sword	Paradox Interactive	2011-05-13	✗	✗
Ms. Splosion Man	Microsoft Studios	2013-04-03	✗	✗
Need for Speed: Shift	Electronic Arts	2011-02-22	✗	✗
Need for Speed: Shift 2	Electronic Arts	2011-03-29	✗	✗
Operation Flashpoint: Red River (Europe)	Codemasters	2011-05-19	✗	✗
Operation Flashpoint: Red River (North America)	Codemasters	2011-06-07	✗	✗
Osmos	Microsoft Studios	2009-12-22	✗	✗
Patrician IV	Kalypso Media	2011-01-20	✗	✗
Patrician IV: Rise of a Dynasty (Note: Requires the base game Patrician IV in order to play)	Kalypso Media	2011-04-14	✗	✗
Pirates of Black Cove	Paradox Interactive	2011-08-15	✗	✗
Plants vs. Zombies	PopCap Games	2010-11-17	✗	✗
Poker Superstars III	Funkitron	2010-11-16	✗	✗
Prince of Persia	Ubisoft	2010-08-05	✗	✗
Prince of Persia: The Forgotten Sands	Ubisoft	2010-06-08	✗	✗
Prince of Persia: The Sands of Time	Ubisoft	2010-06-08	✗	✗
Prince of Persia: The Two Thrones	Ubisoft	2010-09-02	✗	✗
Prince of Persia: Warrior Within	Ubisoft	2010-06-08	✗	✗
Pro Cycling Manager 2011	Focus Home Interactive	2011-08-10	✗	✗
Project Snowblind	Square Enix	2011-01-26	✗	✗
Prototype	Activision	2010-11-14	✗	✗
Ranch Rush 2	Fresh Games	2011-03-31	✗	✗
Red Faction: Guerrilla	THQ	2009-12-15	✗	✗
Resident Evil: Operation Raccoon City	Capcom	2012-09-20	✗	✗
Resident Evil 5	Capcom	2009-12-15	✗	✗
Rift	Trion Worlds	2011-03-01	✗	✗
Rift Collector's Edition	Trion Worlds	2011-03-01	✗	✗
Rift: Ashes of History Collector's Edition	Trion Worlds	2011-10-24	✗	✗
Rise of Flight: Iron Cross Edition	Strategy First	2011-02-17	✗	✗
Rome: Total War Gold Edition	Sega	2010-09-09	✗	✗
S.T.A.L.K.E.R.: Shadow of Chernobyl	THQ	2010-06-08	✗	✗
Saints Row 2	THQ	2010-07-30	✗	✗
Section 8	SouthPeak Games	2009-12-15	✗	✗
Section 8: Prejudice	TimeGate Studios	2011-05-04	✗	✗
Shadowrun	Microsoft Studios	2009-12-15	✗	✗
Shaun White Skateboarding	Ubisoft	2010-12-18	✗	✗
Sid Meier's Civilization IV: The Complete Edition	2K Games	2010-07-16	✗	✗
Silent Hunter 5: Gold Edition	Ubisoft	2010-08-26	✗	✗
Singularity	Activision	2010-11-14	✗	✗
Slingo Deluxe	Funkitron	2010-11-16	✗	✗
Splinter Cell: Conviction	Ubisoft	2010-06-08	✗	✗
Spore	Electronic Arts	2011-06-14	✗	✗
Stormrise	Sega	2010-02-16	✗	✗
Street Fighter IV	Capcom	2009-12-15	✗	✗
Street Fighter X Tekken	Capcom	2012-10-17	✗	✗
Super Street Fighter IV: Arcade Edition	Capcom	2011-07-08	✗	✗
Super TextTwist	GameHouse	2010-12-08	✗	✗
Supreme Commander	THQ	2010-08-19	✗	✗
Supreme Commander: Forged Alliance	THQ	2010-08-19	✗	✗
Supreme Ruler Cold War	Paradox Interactive	2011-07-28	✗	✗
Test Drive: Ferrari Racing Legends	Atari	2013-01-11	✗	✗
TextTwist 2	GameHouse	2010-12-01	✗	✗
The Club	Sega	2010-03-26	✗	✗
The First Templar	Kalypso Media	2011-05-12	✗	✗
The Next BIG Thing	Focus Home Interactive	2011-04-21	✗	✗
The Settlers 7: Paths to a Kingdom	Ubisoft	2010-06-29	✗	✗
The Sims 3	Electronic Arts	2011-03-17	✗	✗
The Sims 3: Ambitions (Note: Requires the base game The Sims 3 in order to play.)	Electronic Arts	2011-03-24	✗	✗
The Sims 3: Generations	Electronic Arts	2011-06-09	✗	✗
The Sims 3: Late Night	Electronic Arts	2011-03-24	✗	✗
The Sims 3: World Adventures	Electronic Arts	2011-03-17	✗	✗
The Sims Medieval	Electronic Arts	2011-03-22	✗	✗
The Sims Medieval: Pirates and Nobles (Note: Requires the base game The Sims Medieval in order to play)	Electronic Arts	2011-09-19	✗	✗
Thief: Deadly Shadows	Square Enix	2010-09-30	✗	✗
Tinker	Microsoft Studios	2009-12-15	✗	✗
Tom Clancy's Ghost Recon Advanced Warfighter 2	Ubisoft	2010-08-26	✗	✗
Tom Clancy's H.A.W.X 2	Ubisoft	2010-12-18	✗	✗
Tom Clancy's Rainbow Six: Vegas 2	Ubisoft	2010-08-05	✗	✗
Tomb Raider: Anniversary	Square Enix	2010-11-14	✗	✗
Tomb Raider: Legend	Square Enix	2010-11-14	✗	✗
Tomb Raider: Underworld	Square Enix	2010-06-29	✗	✗
Toy Soldiers	Microsoft Studios	2012-04-27	✗	✗
Trainz Simulator 2010	N3V Games	2011-02-11	✗	✗
Trainz Simulator 2010: Blue Comet (Note: Requires the base game Trainz Simulator 2010: Engineers Edition in order to play.)	N3V Games	2011-02-11	✗	✗
Trainz Simulator 12	N3V Games	2011-07-07	✗	✗
Trainz: Classic Cabon City	N3V Games	2011-02-11	✗	✗
Trainz: Settle and Carlisle	N3V Games	2011-02-11	✗	✗
Transformers: War for Cybertron	Activision	2010-11-14	✗	✗
Tron: Evolution	Disney Interactive Studios	2010-12-07	✗	✗
Tropico 3 Gold Edition	Kalypso Media	2011-01-20	✗	✗
Two Worlds II	SouthPeak Games	2011-03-10	✗	✗
Universe at War: Earth Assault	Sega	2010-07-16	✗	✗
Vancouver 2010	Sega	2010-01-15	✗	✗
Victoria II	Paradox Interactive	2011-01-13	✗	✗
Virtua Tennis 4	Sega	2011-06-24	✗	✗
Viva Piñata	Microsoft Studios	2009-12-15	✗	✗
Warhammer 40,000: Dawn of War	THQ	2010-08-19	✗	✗
Warhammer 40,000: Dawn of War: Dark Crusade	THQ	2010-08-19	✗	✗
Warhammer 40,000: Dawn of War II	THQ	2010-03-16	✗	✗
Warhammer 40,000: Dawn of War II – Chaos Rising	THQ	2010-03-11	✗	✗
Where’s Waldo? The Fantastic Journey	Microsoft Studios	2009-12-22	✗	✗
World in Conflict: Complete Edition	Ubisoft	2010-07-23	✗	✗
World of Goo	Microsoft Studios	2009-12-22	✗	✗
Zoo Tycoon 2: Ultimate Collection	Microsoft Studios	2010-11-14	✗	✗
Zuma's Revenge!	PopCap Games	2010-11-16	✗	✗

== See also ==
- Xbox 360 Games on Demand
- Games for Windows – Live
- List of Games for Windows – Live titles
- List of Games for Windows titles
- Live Anywhere
