= Blacklight: Retribution =

2012 video game

- Promotional artwork for the game
- Developers: Zombie Studios (2012–2015); Hardsuit Labs (2015–2025)
- Publisher: Perfect World Entertainment
- Designer: Jared Gerritzen
- Engine: Unreal Engine 3
- Platforms: Microsoft Windows, PlayStation 4
- Release: Windows; July 3, 2012; PlayStation 4: NA: November 15, 2013; PAL: December 4, 2013
- Genre: First-person shooter Cyberpunk
- Mode: Multiplayer

Blacklight: Retribution was a free-to-play first-person shooter video game developed and published by Hardsuit Labs (formerly Zombie Studios) for Microsoft Windows and PlayStation 4. It was initially published by Perfect World Entertainment on April 3, 2012, with a full Steam release on July 3. A PS4 version was released as a launch title in North America on November 15, 2013, followed by Europe and Australia on December 4.

The sequel to Blacklight: Tango Down, the game is a cyberpunk-themed, arena style shooter that features a number of game modes, including a training mode and others commonly found in games of the same genre. Unique mechanics include weapon depots, which are used to acquire health, ammo, and special weapons, and the Hyper Reality Visor (HRV), which allows players to locate hazards through walls and other obstacles. Completing matches rewards the player with experience and GP, the latter of which can be used to buy additional weapons, armor, and cosmetic items, including skins and tags. Additional game modes were added after its release, including OnSlaught and Siege Mode.

Retribution saw numerous additions and power shifts throughout its development. Following Zombie's closure in 2015, the remaining team regrouped as Hardsuit Labs, who oversaw development from that point forward. In 2017, Perfect World reverted publishing rights to Hardsuit Labs, who subsequently introduced several new changes, including the migration of US and EU servers.

Blacklight: Retribution received positive reviews from critics, with some calling it an improvement over its predecessor. Praise was directed towards its graphics, mechanics, item balance, and deep customization, while criticism was directed towards its lack of innovation. The game proved popular, achieving one million players within a month of its release. The PC version was discontinued on March 11, 2019 following low user engagement, while the PS4 version was delisted in 2024 and online servers shut down on August 31, 2025.

== Gameplay ==
Blacklight: Retribution takes place in a cyberpunk setting and possesses a number of game types and maps. The game currently has no single player other than a controls tutorial level, a zombies game mode titled OnSlaught and a "practice" mode pitting players against AI or "bot" enemies. The game types are: Deathmatch, Team Deathmatch, Capture the Flag, Domination (a ticket type of game), King of the Hill (objective capture) and Kill Confirmed (Similar to Team Deathmatch, but players must collect tokens from their dead opponents for the kill to count for the team. They can also be picked up for extra Combat Points. Friendly players may pick up the token of a dead teammate to deny their enemies the kill point and to gain extra Combat Points). Siege Mode, where one team advances a Scorpion Tank through checkpoints into enemy territory, was added in August 2012. In March 2013, OnSlaught mode was added, in which players collect tokens to gain XP and GP.

Weapon depots are a new addition to Blacklight: Retribution. By default, they can be used to buy various tools, such as Health or Ammo Refills, Flamethrowers, Rocket Launchers, and Hardsuits, which are small pilot-able mecha equipped with heavy weaponry. These can be bought using Combat Points which can be earned by doing desired actions in the game such as killing opponents and capturing points.

Like its predecessor, Blacklight Retribution features the Hyper Reality Visor (HRV) which allows the player to locate enemies, mines, weapon depots and Hardsuit weak points through walls and other obstacles for a very short amount of time. In HRV, the player is only able to move around, jump, and sprint, which may increase the chances of a HRV user being easily killed. HRV also has a very limited use time and needs to recharge. There are various in-game items that obscure or hide objects and players from HRV.

A total of sixteen maps are available, and vary in size and style.

There has been a clan making feature added in the game. In which players can create their own clans with a 4 letter limit for the name by buying it with GP/Zcoins. The clan size can be increased by spending GP/Zcoins.

With the OnSlaught Patch, the OnSlaught mode, the "S&D" mode (search and destroy), the Last Team/Man Standing modes have been added, also with new weapons and armor pieces.

Each weapon can have several different receivers, ranging from assault rifles to shotguns. Players can change the muzzle, barrel, magazine, optic sights, stock, camouflage and weapon tag, which is a key-chain like emblem that hangs off of a lanyard hook. There are some specific attachments for some receivers that cannot be used for other receivers. In addition, there are 'premade' weapons which had a fixed set of attachments. These attachments could not be switched out for different ones, or be used for other weapons. Only the camouflage and weapon tags were interchangeable. Weapon tags grant small bonuses to the weapon or character's stats, while camouflage is only cosmetic.

Players can also customize their character's helmet, leg and body armor, and tactical gear (such as grenades and other tools). Before the "Parity Patch", there existed 'heroes' which had a fixed, unique helmet and leg and body armor, as well as an inventory system and a game mode called Siege. The different components of these heroes could not be switched out for different ones, or be used for other character layouts. The inventory system was removed after the Parity Patch, meaning items could no longer be stored or stacked for later use. Also after the Parity Patch, heroes were turned into different cosmetic models for the player's in-game character. The game mode Siege, an "escort the payload"-style game mode where players escorted a tank through several checkpoints which had to be "hacked" open, was also removed.

== Development ==
On 14 January 2011, Zombie Studios revealed that it would be developing Blacklight: Retribution with a free-to-play business model. At the 2011 Electronic Entertainment Expo (E3), the company announced that Perfect World would publish Blacklight: Retribution. The game went to open beta on February 27, 2012 and went live on April 3, 2012. It was released on Steam on July 3, 2012.

In December 2012, Zombie Studios announced that Blacklight: Retribution would be released for the PlayStation 4, aiming for a Q4 2013 release. It was later confirmed that the game will be part of the PlayStation 4's launch lineup and it was released in North America on November 15, 2013.

In January 2015, following the closure of Zombie Studios, the Blacklight team split and founded Hardsuit Labs, who took on development and publishing of the game from that point forward. The same year, Hardsuit rolled out the Parity Patch, which increased consistency between the PC and PS4 ports.

On November 20, 2017, Hardsuit Labs and Perfect World Entertainment Inc, announced that the publisher rights for the game would be reverted to Hardsuit, and announced the migration of US and EU servers using Multiplay, in addition to the migration of Arc accounts into Steam. The changes were completed in January 2018.

On February 8, 2019, Hardsuit Labs announced that they would end support for the game to focus on bigger projects, citing low user engagement as a primary factor for the decision. The PC version ceased to operate on March 11, 2019. The PS4 version was delisted in 2024, with the online servers subsequently shutting down on August 31, 2025.

== Reception ==
Reception

Aggregate score
Aggregator	Score
Metacritic	PC: 75/100; PS4: 58/100

Review scores
Publication	Score
Destructoid	9/10
GameSpot	6.5/10
GameSpy	4/5
IGN	8.5/10

Review aggregation website Metacritic gave Blacklight: Retribution 75/100, indicating "generally favorable" reviews, while its predecessor received a 61/100 indicating "mixed or average" reviews.

IGN gave Blacklight: Retribution an 8.5 out of 10, praising the game for its graphics, gameplay and deep customization. GameSpot's review was more harsh, giving the game a 6.5 out of 10 ("Fair"). Although they praised the shooting mechanics and item balance, they criticized the game for being too generic and hoped that the planned Siege and Netwar modes will help it stand out.
