= Bee Movie Game =

2007 video game

- North American Windows cover art
- Developers: Beenox (Xbox 360, PS2, Win); Smart Bomb Interactive (Wii); Vicarious Visions (DS)
- Publisher: Activision
- Producer: DreamWorks Animation
- Platforms: Xbox 360, Wii, Nintendo DS, PlayStation 2, Windows
- Release: NA: October 30, 2007; NA: November 5, 2007 (Wii); EU: November 16, 2007; AU: December 5, 2007
- Genres: Adventure, platform
- Modes: Single-player, multiplayer

Bee Movie Game is a video game based on the DreamWorks-animated movie Bee Movie. The game was released on October 30, 2007. Beenox developed the Xbox 360, PlayStation 2, and Microsoft Windows versions of the game, Smart Bomb Interactive developed the Wii version, and Vicarious Visions developed the Nintendo DS version. As Barry B. Benson, players take on an adventure to save the bees' production of honey through New York City. Players get to experience Barry's life within the hive and navigate their way around the world from the feature film using many techniques. Players can drive through the city using race cars, scooters, taxicabs, and trucks. Players can "fly" Barry at high speed through the sky. Using the Pollinator, players can Blast through obstacles or they can Buzz to cause a chain reaction. Players get to Stop Time by using Barry's bee reflexes. The video game features 2-person multiplayer minigames. Jerry Seinfeld, John Goodman, Patrick Warburton, and Tress MacNeille reprise their voices from the movie in this game.

== Plot ==
A honey bee named Barry B. Benson stars on a new show known as "New Hive Tonight". On the show, Barry talks about how he changed the lives of honey bees and humans, bringing them together.

On his graduation day from BU University (which is the only university in the entire hive, and also maybe a spoof of Boston University, having the same abbreviation), Barry and his best friend Adam Flayman head to a honey factory called "Honex", where they are to work for the rest of their lives. Adam enjoys working, but Barry does not, thinking that everything they do in Honex is making honey, and longs to do something else in the remaining stage of his life. The game focuses on Barry's various job skills which are not in the movie such as car racing, Taxi, playing video arcade games, delivering food to owners, car fixing and doing Honex jobs while not in a mission.

Barry decides that he wants to go to the outside and joins the Pollen Jocks, a group of bees who go to the "outside" to collect nectar from flowers and bring them back. A Pollen Jock manages to train Barry so he would be a Pollen Jock such as how to make flowers bloom, and getting Nectar from them. He also teaches him to kill other non-bee insects such as hornets, wasps, and dragonflies. However, while Barry is resting, it starts to rain, but he manages to find cover in the apartment of a couple: Vanessa and Ken. After distracting a few party guests in the apartment, Ken tries to smash Barry, but Vanessa allows him to escape. Barry soon discovers that the humans "steal" their honey regularly, so he goes to get the honey back. Upon arriving at the grocery store, he duels the owner, Hector, in order to tell him the whereabouts where the honey came from. After chasing a truck delivering honey, he finds himself in a honey farm, where he takes pictures of it to prove to the rest of the bees that the humans are "stealing" their honey. However, a squad of wasps arrive at the apiary to take away the bees and kill Barry but he manages to fend them off and rout them, foiling their plans. Then, Freddy the head Beekeeper manages to smoke all the bees but Barry and the other bees defeat the Beekeeper which he bumps his head on the tree.

Barry and Adam chase after the car of a main defense lawyer named Layton T Montgomery, and secretly listen to a conversation between him and his associate about the human-stealing-honey case while they are in a restaurant called La Couchon. He sneaks into Montgomery's house along with Vanessa and Barry disguises himself as a fly in a Tron-like suit to gain access to a safe which holds papers explaining Montgomery's plan, but it is revealed to be a trick and he is attacked by a group of hornets, but he manages to defeat them.

Barry later goes back to the grocery store as he takes pictures to get evidence on different honey-flavored products. However, Hector notices this, and has Montgomery send his agents to kill Barry. When this fails, Hector captures Adam by trapping him in glass, prompting Barry to rescue him. After rescuing Adam, Hector decides to have the store's sprinklers rain down to finish them off, but Barry escapes using bee reflexes.

Ken fights Barry in Vanessa's bathroom after a misunderstanding. Barry goes to a secret lab to learn about Operation BrSpr and discovers Montgomery's plan to replace normal Honey with a different kind that tastes like Brussel Sprouts. After winning the trial Montgomery comes in with a smoke gun to kill Barry and the bees, they defeat him with a fan falling on him.

During the credits, With all plants wilting Barry fixes his mistake with him and the Pollen jocks spraying pollen everywhere.

== Reception ==
Reception

Aggregate score
Aggregator	Score				
Aggregator	DS	PC	PS2	Wii	Xbox 360
Metacritic	58/100	70/100	65/100	62/100	71/100

Review scores
Publication	Score				
Publication	DS	PC	PS2	Wii	Xbox 360
Game Informer	N/A	N/A	N/A	N/A	6.5/10
GameSpot	5/10	N/A	6.5/10	6.5/10	6.5/10
GameZone	6.2/10	7/10	6.1/10	8/10	8/10
IGN	6.9/10	N/A	6.5/10	6.8/10	7/10
Nintendo World Report	4/10	N/A	N/A	4/10	N/A
PlayStation Official Magazine – UK	N/A	N/A	6/10	N/A	N/A
Official Xbox Magazine (US)	N/A	N/A	N/A	N/A	8/10
PC Gamer (US)	N/A	70%	N/A	N/A	N/A
TeamXbox	N/A	N/A	N/A	N/A	6.8/10
VideoGamer.com	N/A	8/10	8/10	8/10	8/10
Digital Spy	N/A	N/A	4/5	N/A	N/A

The game received "mixed or average reviews" on all platforms according to the review aggregation website Metacritic.

== See also ==
- List of Games for Windows titles
