= Mahjong Tales: Ancient Wisdom =

2007 video game

- Developer(s): Creat Studios
- Publisher(s): Creat Studios & TikGames; Microsoft Game Studios (GFWL)
- Platform(s): PlayStation Network; Games for Windows – LIVE
- Release: March 7, 2007: Windows; WW: March 7, 2007 Games for Windows – LIVE February 22, 2010 PlayStation 3; EU: December 24, 2008; NA: January 8, 2009
- Genre(s): Board
- Mode(s): Single-player, multiplayer

Mahjong Tales: Ancient Wisdom is a board game available from the PlayStation Network and Games for Windows – LIVE, and available for download Via the PlayStation Store and Games on Demand. The game was released January 8, 2009 in United States for the PlayStation 3. The game was developed by Creat Studios and published by Creat Studios & TikGames.

== Gameplay ==
Mahjong Tales combines the features of Mahjong into a single game featuring a narrated story mode that whisks players away into a storybook adventure, revealing hand-illustrated ancient Chinese tales. Mahjong Tales delivers multiple game modes and features trophy support.

== Reception ==
IGN:5.2
