= Games for Windows – Live =

Online gaming service

- Developer: Microsoft
- Type: Content delivery; Digital rights management (DRM); Cross-platform play; Social networking
- Launched: Games for Windows – Live: May 29, 2007; Games on Demand: December 15, 2009
- Discontinued: August 22, 2013
- Final version: 3.5.95.0
- Last updated: February 20, 2014
- Platform: Microsoft Windows
- Operating systems: Windows XP and above
- Status: Digital distribution store closed; online services still available
- Website: www.gfwl.com

Games for Windows – Live or GFWL (Note: Trademarked as Games for Windows – LIVE) is a deprecated online gaming service used by Games for Windows–branded PC titles that originally enabled Windows PCs to connect to Microsoft's Live service. Users, each with a unique Gamertag (the Microsoft username service for gaming that began on Xbox Live), were able to play online, keep track of their friends' status, send and receive messages, gain and keep track of Achievements and associated Gamerscore, voice chat across platforms (removed in 2010), and more. Some games allowed for cross-platform play, such as Shadowrun, pitting Windows players against Xbox 360 players. The successor to Games for Windows – Live is the Xbox network, which allows players on a PC to use online functionality and play various Xbox games without having a console.

== History ==
=== Development ===
On March 14, 2007, Microsoft announced Games for Windows – Live through a press release on their website. The service intended to connect Games for Windows with existing Xbox Live features, including gamertags, achievements, and friend lists. GFWL would also provide new features, including cross-platform play between Windows Vista and Xbox 360 players. It was set to release on May 8, 2007, alongside its first game, Halo 2 for Windows Vista. The first game to utilize GFWL cross-platform play, Shadowrun, was set to release in June 2007.

On May 29, 2007, Games for Windows – Live officially released, alongside its first title, Shadowrun. Halo 2 for Windows Vista, which was intended to be the first GFWL game, was released on June 8, 2007, after significant delays. The game supports all the standard Live features (such as achievements, voice chat, messages, etc.), but does not offer cross-platform play with Xbox players.

Initially, Games for Windows – Live launched with its multiplayer features locked behind an Xbox LIVE Gold subscription, priced at $49.95. In 2008, Microsoft removed the paid tier from GFWL, making all Xbox Live multiplayer services free on PC.

The service was open to third-party developers, but they had to meet certain Technical Certification Requirements (TCRs), which included (but were not limited to): game ratings, total number of Gamerscore points, content, game profiles, and Live connectivity. Games for Windows – Live games also had to meet standard Games for Windows (games that do not have Live support) TCRs. The same developer support infrastructure as the Xbox 360 was also available. Assistance to developers was provided through the Microsoft XNA Developer Connection.

Sega, Eidos, and THQ signed on to include Games for Windows – Live in their upcoming games. Epic Games also included this service in their game engine Unreal Engine 3. Universe at War: Earth Assault from Sega and Lost Planet: Colonies Edition from Capcom include cross-platform play between Xbox 360 and Windows over Live.

On July 22, 2008, Microsoft's Chris Satchell, CTO of the company's Entertainment devices division, announced that Games For Windows – Live would be free to developers. Previously, select publishers and developers used the system and had to pay for it. Additionally, all Games For Windows – Live features became free for gamers, such as matchmaking and cross-platform play. Satchell added that the move was a "way to improve Windows gaming".

Microsoft reduced the technical requirements for developers looking to utilize Live such as removing playlist servers, and allowing studios to use the Microsoft matchmaking servers instead. The new Marketplace was made available for Games for Windows – Live on December 5, 2008. Microsoft also released the newly designed User Interface, on November 12, 2008.

On January 7, 2010, it was announced at CES that the upcoming Xbox Game Room would be made available on both the Xbox Live and Games for Windows Live services. However, games purchased with 240 Microsoft Points will only be playable on one of the platforms; either Xbox 360 or PC. A dual-platform license will cost 400 Microsoft Points. As the Game Room was available to Gold and Silver Xbox members, the service was free to use on Games for Windows Live. Arcade games will feature achievements and online leaderboards.

Microsoft revealed on May 21, 2010, that Fable III would be released on Windows as well as the Xbox 360, and would feature Games for Windows – Live. The downloadable version will be a Games on Demand exclusive.

On August 17, 2010, Microsoft unveiled two new games at Gamescom 2010 that used Games for Windows – LIVE, Age of Empires Online and Microsoft Flight. Age of Empires was free-to-play through LIVE. On September 24, 2010, Microsoft Game Studios' general manager Dave Luehmann said in an interview the studio's renewed focus will start with three big titles—Fable III, Age of Empires Online and Microsoft Flight—which will use Games for Windows – LIVE. Luehmann reassured PC gamers that more big titles were on the way, however the studio plans to test new ideas.

On September 13, 2011, Major Nelson confirmed what Microsoft is bringing Xbox Live to Windows 8, being called Xbox Live on Windows.

=== Deprecation ===
On March 26, 2012, Microsoft Studios announced the arrival of Age of Empires Online on Steam. Age of Empires Online was released on Steam on March 27, 2012. On April 3, 2012, Microsoft Flight was released on Steam. Microsoft Studios release Insanely Twisted Shadow Planet on April 17, 2012, and Toy Soldiers on April 27, 2012, in Games for Windows – LIVE. On April 17, 2012, Microsoft said that they continued to support the Games for Windows platform, to the rumors of the discontinuation of Games for Windows – LIVE in favor of Xbox Live on Windows. On April 13, 2012, Microsoft Studios release Iron Brigade, and is the first Microsoft Studios title available only on Steam.

On August 31, 2012, Gotham City Impostors became free-to-play and dropped Games for Windows – LIVE in favor of Steamworks. On October 10, 2012, the Steam version of Toy Soldiers was updated to fully use Steamworks, although it still gives the option to use the original service. On October 16, 2012, Mark of the Ninja was the first title of Microsoft Studios to use Steamworks exclusively, instead of GfWL. On October 25, 2012, Deadlight became the second title of Microsoft Studios to use Steamworks exclusively. On November 28, 2012, Ace Combat: Assault Horizon became the first (and only) retail Games for Windows – LIVE title announced for 2013.

On January 31, 2013, Microsoft Studios said that they "have nothing to share on the future of Games for Windows Live". On March 7, 2013, Microsoft Studios announced Age of Empires II: HD Edition + The Conquerors would be released exclusively on Steam. On April 3, 2013, Ms. Splosion Man was released by Microsoft Studios on both platforms. On August 9, 2013, Microsoft announced the removal of one of the most criticized limitations for the LIVE platform, the inability of simultaneously logging in on both the Xbox One and Games for Windows LIVE.

On August 16, 2013, Microsoft announced that the Xbox.com PC Marketplace was going to be closed on August 22, 2013, alongside the Xbox 360 update that retired Microsoft Points in favour of local currency purchases. The service would otherwise continue to operate normally.

In August 2013, a since-deleted support article for Age of Empires Online announced that the Games for Windows – Live service would be discontinued on July 1, 2014. Microsoft issued a statement in June 2014 denying they were closing Games for Windows Live, stating "We remain committed to investing in PC gaming in the years ahead, and look forward to sharing more in the future". After the initial August 2013 support article, some game publishers announced that they would be removing GFWL from their games, but in most cases this did not happen until several years later or at all.

In 2020, Microsoft removed the Games for Windows – Live client download page and the Windows Live Sign-in Assistant was removed from their servers, and therefore the Games for Windows – Live online installer fails to install. It became only possible to install via the offline installer since then.

From 2022, users are unable to login to Games for Windows – Live through the Games for Windows Marketplace client. The in-game overlay, however, still works fully on all games already owned either digitally or retail, with long login times ranging from 1 to 5 minutes.

On October 1, 2022, Microsoft posted on its FAQ page that all services related to Games for Windows – Live were discontinued.

== Features ==
Some features of the service include the following:

- Achievements earned during gameplay
- Gamerscores amounting the total of a user's achievement points
- Reputation voted by other users preferring or avoiding the user. Rep defaults to five stars over time after the user has been preferred by at least one other user
- Friends list displaying the user's chosen friends of up to 100
- Recent players list displaying the last 50 players the user has met
- Complaint system allowing users to file reports of other users that have broken Live Terms of Use
- Games for Windows Marketplace offered Games on Demand, downloadable content, music and movies until its closure in 2013
- Public and private chat via Voice and text. The voice feature worked between Xbox 360 and Windows until 2010, when Microsoft updated the voice codec for Xbox Live. Games, such as Shadowrun, now only support the text portion of this feature
- Multiplayer gameplay via Games for Windows – Live
- Matchmaking depending on the user's cumulative gamerscore, rep, location, language and gamer zone
- Family settings controlling younger users' exposure to other users
- Game Room virtual arcade space offering a library of classic retro games
- Cross-platform gameplay with Xbox 360

=== Gamertag ===
A Gamertag is the universal name for a player's username on Games for Windows – Live, as well as Xbox Live, Zune, and XNA Creators Club. A Gamertag used online must be unique and can be up to 15 characters in length, including numbers, letters, and spaces.

A player's Gamertag account status can be checked using a variety of online tools, which is useful especially when looking for a new Gamertag, or confirming that a Gamertag exists. Using a valid Gamertag, any player can be located and messaged from within Live. There are also several websites which allow users of Gamertags to upload photos and information about themselves.

=== Gamerscore ===
The Gamerscore (G) is an achievements system that measures the number of achievement points accumulated by a user with a Live profile. These Achievement points are awarded for the completion of game-specific challenges, such as beating a level or amassing a specified number of wins against other players in online matches.

All regular disc-based games must have 1,000 Gamerscore points in the base game; the title can ship with fewer than 1,000 points, but anything added later must be free. Game developers also have the option of adding up to 250 points via downloadable content every three months after the first year of release (for a total of 1,750 points).

On May 26, 2007, Halo 2 was the first Games for Windows – Live title to feature Achievements, which counted towards a player's Gamerscore.

=== Gamercard ===
The Gamercard is an information panel used to summarize a user's Live profile. The pieces of information on a Gamercard include: the user's Gamertag (in front a silver or gold bar), reputation, Gamerscore, Gamer Zone and recently played games.

=== TrueSkill ===
TrueSkill is a ranking and matchmaking system premiering in the Live services. Developed at Microsoft Research Cambridge (United Kingdom), the TrueSkill ranking system is now used in many titles for Games for Windows – Live. It uses a mathematical model of uncertainty to address weaknesses in existing ranking systems such as Elo. For example, a new player joining million-player leagues can be ranked correctly in fewer than 20 games. It can predict the probability of each game outcome, which enhances competitive matchmaking, making it possible to assemble skill-balanced teams from a group of players with different abilities.

When matchmaking, the system attempts to match individuals based on their estimated skill level. If two individuals are competing head-to-head and have the same estimated skill level with low estimate uncertainty, they should each have roughly a 50% chance of winning a match. In this way, the system attempts to make every match as competitive as possible.

In order to prevent abuse of the system, the majority of ranked games have relatively limited options for matchmaking. By design, players cannot easily play with their friends in ranked games. However, these countermeasures have failed due to techniques such as alternate account(s) and system flaws where each system has its own individual trueskill rating. To provide less competitive games, the system supports unranked Player Matches, which allow individuals of any skill level to be paired (often including "guests" on an account). Such matches do not contribute to the TrueSkill rating.

== In-game client ==
The current version of the in-game Live client is version 3.5.0088.0, released on May 6, 2011. It is available for Windows Vista, Windows 7, Windows 8.1 and Windows 10 operating systems. Version 3.0 added extended information about progress and some bugfixes. The client also auto-updates when users are logged-on to a Live-aware game.

The user interface or "Guide" was changed from earlier versions (made to match the Xbox 360's original appearance) to a new appearance. The guide includes messaging (text and voice), friends list, recent players, private chat, and personal settings.

== Digital distribution ==
=== Marketplace ===
The Games for Windows Marketplace client was officially released on December 4, 2009. It initially launched with demos and trailers of games available on the Live service. Full titles were later added in the form of Games on Demand.

With version 3.0 of the Games for Windows – Live service, an in-game marketplace was included; in addition to new account management tools, such as the ability to change a Gamertag for 800 Microsoft Points. The in-game marketplace enables users to purchase DLC without exiting, as it installs the content directly from within the game.

=== Games on Demand ===
On December 15, 2009, Microsoft launched Games on Demand, a digital distribution service offering titles such as Resident Evil 5 and Battlestations: Pacific. Also available were arcade games such as a free version of Microsoft Tinker, a former exclusive to Windows Vista Ultimate, as well as World of Goo and Osmos.

Some titles bought on Games on Demand include Server Side Authentication. This is a Games for Windows – Live 3.0 feature that automatically ties the game to a Windows Live ID and the Gamertag associated to it. These games have no activation limits and can be re-installed multiple times. The majority of the other titles on the service use a SecuROM DRM that lets the user activate the game up to five times each month on any hardware.

On June 8, 2010, some games which were previously not Games for Windows titles were added for download. Microsoft had claimed that new titles would be added every week and that there would be over 100 games by the end of 2010.

On October 22, 2010, Microsoft announced a revamp of Games On Demand under the "Games for Windows Marketplace" branding. However, this was met with low expectations from reviewers, considering the history of Games for Windows Live on PC. On July 22, 2011, less than a year after the revamp, Microsoft announced that it would merge the Games for Windows Marketplace into the Xbox website.

=== Store discontinuation ===
On July 22, 2011, Microsoft announced that they would be scrapping the newly revamped Games for Windows Marketplace website and merged the content with the Xbox website. The Games for Windows Marketplace client, which was another way for users to purchase games, was also reduced to simply opening up the Windows section of Xbox.com. On August 15, 2013, Microsoft announced that the marketplace would be closed on August 22 of the same year.

The Marketplace became non-functional in 2018 with purchased games no longer displaying and instead presenting an error saying "There was an error retrieving your purchase history. Please sign out and try again later" despite existing purchases being supposed to still be available to download.

The Games for Windows Marketplace client stopped logging in entirely in 2022 due to TLS 1.0 and 1.1 connections being no longer permitted for Xbox Live accounts to login and therefore presents a connection error when launching the program. The marketplace however, was already non-functional since 2018.

== Availability ==
As of February 10, 2015 Games for Windows – Live was available in 42 countries/territories. Users in other countries can access Live by creating a Gamertag using an address from a supported country, although no technical support is available outside of the supported countries. Since Games for Windows – Live is based on the Xbox Live service, availability is exactly identical to the regional availability of Xbox Live. The Marketplace is not available for all of these regions.

Worldwide Games for Windows – Live availability

- Argentina
- Australia
- Austria
- Belgium
- Brazil
- Canada
- Chile
- Colombia
- Czech Republic
- Denmark
- Finland
- France
- Germany
- Greece
- Hong Kong
- Hungary
- India
- Ireland
- Israel
- Italy
- Japan
- Mexico
- Morocco
- Netherlands
- New Zealand
- Norway
- Philippines
- Poland
- Portugal
- Russia
- Saudi Arabia
- Singapore
- Slovakia
- South Africa
- South Korea
- Spain
- Sweden
- Switzerland
- Taiwan
- Turkey
- United Arab Emirates
- United Kingdom
- United States

== Controversies ==
After the official announcement of Games for Windows – Live, many PC gamers were upset with Microsoft's move to charge PC gamers a fee of $49.99 to use the service. Many PC gamers felt this move was unfair, as playing online and many of the other services GFWL offered has, for the most part, always been free on the PC. Microsoft later began offering the service free of charge, after many complaints from PC gamers were made.

After the announcement that the PC release of Dark Souls would use Games for Windows – Live, fans started up a petition to have the game released without the service attached. The online petition gained over 20,000 signatures in under a week, reflecting a notable public dislike of the service among PC gamers. The game would move to Steamworks in 2014.

In January 2020, Grand Theft Auto IV was removed from sale on Steam, with Rockstar Games stating "With Microsoft no longer supporting Games for Windows – Live, it is no longer possible to generate the additional keys needed to continue selling the current version of the game." In February, Rockstar announced that on March 19, an updated version named Grand Theft Auto IV: The Complete Edition, without Games for Windows – Live, would replace the previous version. The online leaderboards and multiplayer were removed as they relied on GFWL services to function. The Rockstar Games Launcher is now required to launch the game, which acts as a replacement for the DRM and achievements features of GFWL.

In 2014, Fallout 3 and Fallout 3: Game of the Year Edition were rendered inoperable due to their reliance on GFWL's digital rights management. In 2021, a patch was released for the Steam versions of both games that removed GFWL entirely. This patch allowed the game to launch without third-party modification, but prevented some players from accessing DLC initially purchased through the service.

== See also ==
- Games for Windows
- Index of Windows games
- List of Games for Windows titles
- List of Games for Windows – Live titles
- Windows Games on Demand
- List of Xbox Live games on Windows 10
- Live Anywhere
