= Hour of Victory =

2007 video game

- Developer: N-Fusion Interactive
- Publisher: Midway Games
- Composer: Jason Graves
- Engine: Unreal Engine 3
- Platforms: Xbox 360, Microsoft Windows
- Release: Xbox 360: NA: June 25, 2007; AU: June 28, 2007; EU: June 29, 2007; Microsoft Windows: EU: February 22, 2008
- Genre: First-person shooter
- Modes: Single-player, multiplayer

Hour of Victory is a first-person shooter video game developed by American studio N-Fusion Interactive and published by Midway Games. It was released in June 2007 for Xbox 360 and February 2008 for Microsoft Windows. It was the first World War II game to use the Unreal Engine 3.

== Plot ==
Three Allied agents are assembled: Firstly, Special Operations Officer Abrose Taggert, an American covert soldier. Secondly, S.O. Officer Calvin Blackbull, an American sniper. Lastly, S.O. Officer William Ross, a front line commando. They are sent to the town of Al-Shatar in Libya, where Major Colman tells them about the nuclear arms project codenamed Götterdämmerung. A sudden German invasion forces the S.O. officers to fight back and liberate the town, protecting the comm center, downing bombers and using a single Sherman Tank to blow up Tiger Tanks.

After the German presence is repelled, the S.O. Officers return to headquarters. They are briefed by that the Project Götterdämmerung is being worked on by two key scientists, the first being a previous acquaintance called Steckler who survived the sinking of the Sieg ship and the other, a Danish physicist Dr. Martin Fielder. The three-man team is sent to Castle Festunburg in the Alps to rescue Fielder, who is being made to develop an atomic bomb against his will. They enter the castle by cable car. Taggert stealthily enters the sewers and manages to free Fielder in the old cellars. They fight their way through the castle and use a Panzer Tank to make a forceful exit.

Having been denied atomic bomb capabilities and the town of Berlin quickly falling into Allied hands, Steckler has decided to cause nuclear reactor meltdown and poison everyone. To prevent this, the S.O. Officers aid the Russians in their fight in Berlin and break into the university. Having battled through a fortified courtyard, they acquire the blueprints for the nuclear technology in the grand library, then enter the nuclear facility, sabotage the nuclear machinery and are able to stop the Germans from overloading the reactor.

Having stopped Steckler's nefarious plans, the S.O. Officers are sent to the Reich Chancellery to capture the evil scientist. They fiercely fight their way through multiple rooms and corridors, until they make it to Steckler's office. After some banter, the scientist sets his men on the three officers, who are forced to defend themselves and ultimately kill Steckler.

== Gameplay ==
Hour of Victory advertises itself as letting players "fight the famous battles of WWII". The game features multiple settings from Europe and North Africa, such as a nuclear reactor in Berlin, castles, etc. Players can assume the roles of three different soldiers each with different skills: Captain Ross, a British Commando and brute fighter, Lieutenant Bull, an Army Ranger sniper, or Major Taggert, a stealthy covert operative. Each character also has a special skill: Captain Ross can use his strength to push things out of the way, Lieutenant Bull can climb ropes, and Major Taggert can pick locks. Players are able to drive any vehicles they find such as Kubelwagens, Sherman tanks, Panzers, and Tiger tanks. A player's health is automatically restored if a player avoids damage for a short while and stands still. A stamina meter also controls how fast a player can run. The single-player campaign lasts approximately five to seven hours.

=== Multiplayer ===
There are three modes of multiplayer through System Link or through Xbox Live — Deathmatch, Capture the Flag, and Devastation — and supports up to 12 players.

== Development ==
The game was under development in New York and was going to compete with the Call of Duty and Medal of Honor franchises. The game's plot was mainly inspired by Indiana Jones, not focusing on historical accuracy. Executive producer Mark Caldwell described the game as a cross between Indiana Jones and Saving Private Ryan. Phil Vitiello was programming advanced AI into the enemies, so that they reacted intelligently to the player's actions. According to the producer Jeremy Ray, the player would have freedom of movement without being remote controlled at any time during the game, combined with the player's ability to play the game at their own pace, and being able to play the game in one way or another dependent on the chosen character. Certain elements like Ross breaking down doors, Ambrose speaking German and driving a Kübelwagen were scrapped. By early 2007, the multiplayer mode was in the works.

=== Marketing ===
Midway had intended to keep the game's existence secret until some time after its release. Originally it was going to be released early in 2007. The 2006 E3 confirmed the development of the PC version. The developers deliberately left out blood and Nazi symbols to increase commercial interest. Despite this, there was enough violence to qualify it as a mature-rated game. The game was going to be released on the PlayStation 3 around the same time as the Xbox 360, but that plan was cancelled. The title was announced in the 2007 E3.

By the third quarter of 2007, Midway Games had lost over 33 million dollars from poor sales. As a result, the PC version of Hour of Victory was only released in the European market. Only 120,000 copies were sold worldwide.

== Reception ==
The game received substantially negative reviews from critics. On the review aggregator GameRankings, it had an average score of 38.05% based on 39 reviews. On Metacritic, the game had an average score of 37 out of 100, based on 33 reviews.

IGN's 5.7/10 review criticized the lack of originality, the multiplayer portion, and the graphics, saying, "Hour of Victory is a mediocre shooter with bad graphics and terrible multiplayer."

GameSpot's review was particularly scathing, with Jeff Gerstmann scoring the game just 2 out of 10 (making it the lowest rated Xbox 360 game on the site to date), saying the game "is practically broken and has no business being on shelves in its current state" and "no one, under any circumstances, should play this game." As the only "pro" in the pro and con section of the review, Gerstmann wrote, "thankfully, no one is forcing you to play this game." GameSpot went on to name it the "Flat-Out Worst Game" of 2007. The game received the following 9 demerits: Bad Sound Effects, Bad Value, Busted, Broken and Buggy, Derivative, Shallow, Short, Stripped, and Weak Story.

ScrewAttack made it a SAGY nominee for Worst 360 game of the year. Eurogamer also gave the 2 out of 10, whilst GameCentral marked it even lower, giving it only 1 out of 10. Official Xbox Magazine rated this game a 2.5 out of 10 (a.k.a. Broken) and gave it the "Worst 'Value' of the Year" Award in the OXM 2007 Game of the Year Awards.

Maxim was, however, much more appreciative of the game, giving it 4 out of 5. Official Xbox Magazine UK gave the game a rating of 6 out of 10.

== See also ==
- Video games notable for negative reception
