= Blacklight: Tango Down =

2010 video game

- Developer: Zombie Studios
- Publisher: Ignition Entertainment
- Designer: Jared Gerritzen
- Writers: Mark Long, Jared Gerritzen, Ian Stephens
- Engine: Unreal Engine 3
- Platforms: Xbox 360; Windows; PlayStation 3
- Release: Xbox 360; July 7, 2010; Windows; July 14, 2010; PlayStation 3: NA: October 26, 2010; EU: November 3, 2010
- Genre: First-person shooter
- Mode: Multiplayer

Blacklight: Tango Down is a dystopian cyberpunk-themed online multiplayer first-person shooter video game developed by Zombie Studios and published by Ignition Entertainment. The game was released on July 7, 2010 on Xbox 360 as a downloadable title, and was released on Microsoft Windows (with Games for Windows – Live requirement) on July 14, 2010. The game was also released in late 2010 for the PlayStation 3. The PC version is the one to receive all three patches, where as the Xbox 360 received only the first two patches, and the PlayStation 3 version received no patches, being at retail, launch day version.

Zombie was planning to make Blacklight a multimedia franchise that would include the video game, a feature film, and a trilogy of comic books, however the company became defunct on January 8, 2015. The idea was conceptualized by Zombie executives which later pitched the idea to several film and comic book production companies. The film rights were immediately bought by Fox Atomic to create a film adaptation of the franchise. Fox Atomic's comic subsidiary, Fox Atomic Comics, was also to be creating the Blacklight comics, but after the closing of Fox Atomic, the trans-media rights have been purchased by Imagine Entertainment. The film, comic books, and game will not share the same storylines, but tell different stories in the Blacklight universe at different time periods. As of February 2019, there are no new updates for the film's status, other than that Jason Hall was the screenwriter for the project in 2010, and producer Richard Leibowitz. No film director or cast member has ever been publicly announced for the project, and the film currently languishes in development hell.

== Gameplay ==
The game contains modes such as Deathmatch, Team Deathmatch, King of the Hill, Domination, Capture the Flag, Last Man Standing, and Last Team Standing, with two slightly more unique modes, those being Retrieval and Detonate. In Detonate, a neutral bomb is at the center of the map, and a player from one team has to plant the bomb at the base of the enemy team, and prevent it from being defused. Retrieval is a modified version of Capture the Flag, where you cannot take the item (being either a bomb or a canister with sensitive information) to your base. There are two of them on the map, one belonging to each team. The points are scored whenever the canister/bomb is at the retrieval zone of the enemy team, where it accumulates points, but it is still an enemy team canister/bomb.

The game makes use of its near-future setting by offering HRV (Hyper Reality Visor) that allow players to see an enemy's presence through walls and other obstacles, as well as two types of grenades that counter other players' visors through the use of a blurring effect, similar to a digital smokescreen, along with a type of grenade which emits EMP that forces the enemy's HUD to reboot and reset, resulting in temporary blindness.

The game also features a "Black Ops" game-mode, which supports up to four players, in online co-operative play, through a campaign that takes the player or players through a war-torn city. Blacklight: Tango Down features five distinct weapons, including an assault rifle, a sub-machine gun, a light machine gun, a sniper rifle and a shotgun. Each weapon comes with its own unique futuristic appearance, as well as a wide variety of upgrades and customizations, including variations of magazines, barrels, and camouflages. The weapon customization lets you affect the accuracy, speed, and health for the four different load-out kits you get.

The game contains XP and level up system, familiar to that employed in Call of Duty 4: Modern Warfare, which allows the player rank up through 70 levels. Weapon customizations will unlock as the player gains skill and experience points and will include more basic add-ons like sniper scopes as well as more complex enhancements, such as stocks, barrels, muzzles, magazines, weapon tags, etc.

== Backstory summary ==
Blacklight: Tango Down takes place in a dystopian cyberpunk overpopulated near-future where megacorporations reign supreme and try to manipulate world governments and agencies, and within the confines of a fictional Eastern European city called 'Balik'. The city is a former Soviet state that has become rundown and dilapidated, with some megacorporate presence, of which retreated after its president assassinated by a terrorist rebel group named The Order, ending its totalitarian military dictatorship that was on a downward spiral due to corporate influence and civil unrest, but subsequently caused The Order to take over the city and intentionally create an epidemic with an obscure and mysterious virus named 'Q-Fever' that induces symptoms similar to rabies, and having the infected be named SIVs (slang for Sentient Insanity Virus).

Meanwhile, a United States agency, named Blacklight, is contracted to wage war against the terrorist group after they've killed the initially deployed Tango squad, sent in to locate a Colonel Klein and his personal Blacklight squad after they went missing in the area, which begins to plunge the world into a downward spiral as megacorporations exploit warfare for profit and manipulative political and economical power.

== Development ==
The game was officially announced by Zombie and Fox Atomic on March 16, 2009 at a press conference. The pair announced not only the game, but the collaboration on the film and comic book series as well. The comic book, which tells the story that resulted in the events of the final game, is a loose adaptation of the novel Heart of Darkness.

The only details revealed were the first-person perspective and futuristic setting of the game. However, a screenshot of the game, released in 2009, indicates it may have been third-person, and that within the game's files, may have had a single-player, with many different mechanics hinted (for example, manual saves and under-barrel grenade-launchers). The designers described Blacklight as "Science Fact", as opposed to science fiction. It was explained that this meant Zombie researched the cutting edge of modern-day technology and applied them to the armor and weapons of the game to give it a real but futuristic atmosphere. The weapons are inspired by designs used in the U.S Army from the 1960s and onward. Zombie, having worked with the Army on several training games, have had the ability to check the advances in R&D as far as new technologies.

The following day Zombie founder Mark Long had a public interview revealing much more information about the game. A basic plot summary was issued as well as some weapon designs. Although no release date was set, he noted that the comic book will come first and the game will come "sooner than later".

A few screenshots of the game were released alongside the interview. Most of the screens, in a unique marketing approach, all depict the same scene from different angles and perspectives. The scene depicts a battle between two warring factions dressed in advanced combat armor in an urban environment with several skyscrapers. Some of the buildings are shown being crumbled and some are destroyed with large holes in them from previous battles. Ignition Entertainment announced on March 1, 2010 that they would be publishing the game for the Xbox 360, PlayStation 3, and Microsoft Windows.

== Reception ==
Reception

Aggregate score
Aggregator	Score		
Aggregator	PC	PS3	Xbox 360
Metacritic	65/100	63/100	61/100

Review scores
Publication	Score		
Publication	PC	PS3	Xbox 360
Destructoid	N/A	N/A	3/10
Edge	N/A	N/A	4/10
Eurogamer	N/A	N/A	5/10
Game Informer	N/A	N/A	5.5/10
GamePro	N/A	N/A	3.5/5
GameSpot	6.5/10	N/A	7.5/10
GameTrailers	N/A	N/A	6.5/10
GameZone	N/A	N/A	6.5/10
IGN	6.5/10	N/A	8/10
Official Xbox Magazine (US)	N/A	N/A	5/10
PC Gamer (US)	83%	N/A	N/A
PlayStation: The Official Magazine	N/A	7/10	N/A
Push Square	N/A	7/10	N/A
411Mania	N/A	N/A	6.5/10
Metro	N/A	N/A	5/10

Blacklight: Tango Down received "mixed" reviews on all platforms according to the review aggregation website Metacritic.

The most positive review came from Daemon Hatfield of IGN, who described the Xbox 360 version as a "fun and inexpensive way to get your multiplayer fix", and that "when you first jump into the game it may be hard to believe you only paid $15 for it". However, despite commending the game for being solid, he admitted it was "not particularly inspired". GamesRadar+ gave a similar review to IGN, saying that the same Xbox 360 version "seeks to bring the beloved multiplayer modes of AAA shooters to a downloadable game that only costs fifteen bucks, and in many respects it does this well", but called the co-op modes "linear" and "uninspired".

The lowest scored review came from James Stephanie Sterling of Destructoid, who criticized the co-op missions, saying that the "Black Ops levels seem thrown in for no good reason", and that the "multiplayer is only marginally better". However, she did note, "Tango Down looks really quite good, with visuals that almost look convincingly retail", but that "graphics really aren't worth buying the game for".

Since its release, the Xbox 360 version sold 127,521 units worldwide by January 2011. Sales moved up to 158,353 units by the end of 2011.

== Sequel ==
In July 2010, Zombie Studios revealed to file hosting site Big Download that the team was already starting development on the sequel to Blacklight: Tango Down. According to Zombie Studios CEO Mark Long, the game would feature larger maps and vehicle control. Titled Blacklight: Retribution, it was targeted for a Winter 2011 release, and came out on April 3, 2012 (July 2, 2012 on Steam). The sequel is also a "free-to-play" game.
