= CarneyVale: Showtime =

2008 video game

- Front cover of the Microsoft Windows release
- Developer: Singapore-MIT GAMBIT Game Lab (Note: Ported to Android and iOS by Appxplore)
- Publishers: Singapore-MIT GAMBIT Game Lab (Note: Xbox 360); Microsoft Game Studios (Note: Microsoft Windows and Windows Phone 7); Appxplore (Note: Android and iOS)
- Engine: Microsoft XNA
- Platforms: Xbox 360; Windows Phone 7; Microsoft Windows; Android; iOS
- Release: Xbox 360: WW: December 22, 2008; Windows Phone 7: WW: October 18, 2010; Microsoft Windows: WW: November 1, 2010; Android and iOS: WW: May 5, 2016
- Genre: Platform game
- Mode: Single-player

CarneyVale: Showtime is a vertical platformer developed by Singapore-MIT GAMBIT Game Lab and published by Microsoft Game Studios. It was initially released on Xbox Live Indie Games (then Xbox Live Community Games) on Xbox 360. Players play as Slinky, "a circus acrobat trying to rise up the ranks by performing acrobatic tricks and death-defying stunts through increasingly complex arenas".

The game won the 2008 Dream-Build-Play Challenge, was declared a finalist in the 2008 Independent Games Festival, and was featured as one of the PAX 10 top games at the 2009 Penny Arcade Expo.

== Ports and re-releases ==
Microsoft Game Studios published ports of the game for Windows Phone 7 and Microsoft Windows, which were released on October 18, 2010 and November 1, 2010; respectively. The Windows port was released exclusively via the Games for Windows Marketplace with Games for Windows – Live support.

The rights to the game were bought by Appxplore, who ported it to Android and iOS on May 5, 2016.
