= The First Templar =

2011 video game

- Developer: Haemimont Games
- Publishers: Kalypso Media; FX Interactive (Italy and Spain)
- Platforms: Microsoft Windows; Xbox 360
- Release: EU: May 6, 2011; NA: May 17, 2011
- Genres: Action-adventure, hack and slash
- Modes: Single-player multiplayer

The First Templar is an action-adventure video game developed by Haemimont Games and published by Kalypso Media for the Xbox 360 and Microsoft Windows. It was released on both platforms in May 2011 in Europe and North America.

The First Templar follows the story of two characters: French Templar Celian d'Arestide and his companion, Marie d'Ibelin, a noble lady declared a heretic by the Dominican Inquisition. Taking control of these two unlikely allies, the player must uncover the mysteries of the Templar Order, engage in a grand conspiracy, and discover the secret of the Holy Grail. The First Templar features both single-player and co-op modes. When playing solo, the player can switch between the two characters, with the game's AI controlling the second hero. At any moment, a second player can join in and take control of the AI-controlled hero.

== Gameplay ==
The game may be played solo or cooperatively. Either way, Celian is always present with its partner, being alternated between Roland and Marie. The three characters may be defined in a traditional action roleplaying game style as a Fighter (Roland), a Rogue/Assassin (Marie) and a Paladin (Celian).

The main action is about swordplay with attacks and shield or sword defenses being central. Minor skills are also in existence some being common to all characters and some being exclusive to one or another. Magic is an absent concept being Celian's prayer ability the only one resembling it. The enemies are also of an unmagic kind.

== Plot ==
=== Characters ===
- Celian d'Arestide – The player character, Celian is noble, chivalrous knight who fights to preserve his order amid the Inquisition. Unlike many of his contemporaries, Celian received a formal education in addition to his combat training. Due to him falling from a tower in his past, Celian has lost all of his memories prior to adulthood.
- Marie d'Ibelin – The granddaughter of Guy d'Ibelin, Marie was raised in Saracen traditions. She joins Celian after being branded a heretic by the Inquisitors. Taught to fight and defend herself at an early age, she utilizes twin daggers in combat.
- Roland de Saint-Omer – A senior member of the Templar order who fought alongside Celian in several campaigns in the East.
- Lady Isabelle – a French messenger sent by Phillip IV, you later find out that she is trying to destroy the templar order and she masks her goals to Celian and his friends.
- Wilhelm of Beaujeau – The Grand Master of the Templar Order and Celian's longtime mentor. He is described as a wise leader who is physically robust despite his advanced age.
- Phillip IV – The King of France, and one of the primary antagonists. He betrays the Templar Order and allies himself with the Inquisition.
- The Byzantine – A secondary antagonist introduced in the Arena DLC pack. He lives in a fortified castle with a large arena, and forces his prisoners to engage in gladiatorial combat.

=== Story ===
In 1291, the Crusades and the Kingdom of Jerusalem are nearing their end. Acre, the last Christian city in the Holy Land, is under siege and about to fall into Mamluk hands.

Celian and Roland, two Templar knights, arrive in Cyprus to consult the Templar Grandmaster about their quest for the Holy Grail. They discover that the island is under attack by Muslim warriors and rush to defend it. They rescue a kidnapped messenger from Guy d'Ibelin, who informs them that the Grandmaster's daughter, Marie d'Ibelin, is imprisoned by the Inquisition.

After consulting the Grandmaster, Celian and Roland travel to an undisclosed location in Europe, uncovering a major plot by the Inquisition led by Isaiah. They rescue Marie, but Roland is left behind and presumed dead. Marie then becomes Celian's partner in their ongoing quest for the Grail. They fight numerous Muslim enemies and help those in need, despite Marie's criticism that they are wasting time.

Eventually, they learn of Guy d'Ibelin's death and the permanent loss of the Holy Land. They find the Holy Grail Temple, only to discover it empty. A dying Templar inside mistakes Celian for the Grandmaster. Running out of options, they head to France for advice from the Grandmaster and the main Templar Order.

In 1307, they arrive in France as King Philip IV and Pope Clement V accuse the Templars of heresy. Both are captured by the Inquisition but are saved by Roland, who was tortured into joining the anti-Templar movement but remains loyal to Celian. Roland helps them escape, and they reach a fortified Templar stronghold to regroup and fight the French army.

The Grandmaster reveals that Celian is actually Hugues de Payens, the founder of the Templar Order, suffering from memory loss due to an assassination attempt by the Grandmaster himself. Hugues had hidden the Grail to prevent it from prolonging the lives of the nine founders. The Grandmaster, one of the original nine, manipulated Hugues into searching for the Grail, hoping he would lead them to it.

The true antagonist is revealed to be the Templar Order itself. Celian, regaining his true identity as Hugues, realizes his castle is the best hiding place for the Grail. In the end, the player defeats both the Grandmaster and Isaiah and chooses to either use or destroy the Grail, affecting the final narration with either immortal guardians or a free humanity.

== Reception ==
The First Templar received "mixed or average reviews" according to review aggregator website Metacritic.

While the combat system, visual style and story received some positive feedback, the dated design and lack of polish drew criticism. Eurogamer described it as "..the good kind of 6/10, the sort of zero-expectation, low-budget game that approaches the score from below...a decent hack-and-slash brawler...Not a great one". GameZone gave the game a 3.5 out of 10, stating "This is a game that you're going to want to like. You're going to want it to succeed, but it'll only let you down. The entire time you'll be thinking about what they could have done differently and better."
