= Gotham City Impostors =

2012 video game

- Developer: Monolith Productions
- Publisher: Warner Bros. Interactive Entertainment
- Producer: Nathan Edson
- Designer: Craig Hubbard
- Programmer: Brad Pendleton
- Artist: David Longo
- Composer: Nathan Grigg
- Platforms: Microsoft Windows, PlayStation 3, Xbox 360
- Release: PlayStation 3: NA: February 7, 2012; EU: February 8, 2012; Xbox 360; February 8, 2012; Microsoft Windows; February 7, 2012; August 30, 2012 (F2P)
- Genre: First-person shooter
- Mode: Multiplayer

Gotham City Impostors was a first-person shooter multiplayer-only video game developed by Monolith Productions and published by Warner Bros. Interactive Entertainment. Set in the universe of DC Comics' Batman, it consisted of two teams of six players which try to kill the other team: one with amateur vigilantes dressed like Batman, and the other with criminals dressed like his archenemy, the Joker. It featured customizable characters and a range of both traditional and imagined weapons.

Unlike other Batman games, Gotham City Impostors was not physically released. It was released on Xbox 360 via Xbox Live Arcade, PlayStation 3 via the PlayStation Network and Microsoft Windows via Games for Windows – Live in February 2012. The game was re-released on Microsoft Windows as a free-to-play title on August 30 the same year via Steam using Steamworks.

== Gameplay ==
In Gotham City Impostors there was a heavy emphasis on allowing players to customize their character. Weapons, clothing, and even the size of the character could be modified.

Gotham City Impostors was playable by, at the most, 12 players simultaneously. Players could customize their costume, gadgets and other aspects of the game. It featured a colorful and over-the-top visual style, including such settings as an amusement park. In addition to guns and knives, the players could use other gadgets such as grappling hooks, glider wings, roller skates and explosives. The game included both conventional guns and outlandish weapons, including a grenade fashioned like a jack-in-the-box and a rocket launcher made of PVC piping.

The game had four different modes: "Psych Warfare", "Fumigation", "Bounty Hunter", and "Team Deathmatch". "Psych Warfare" involved the two teams trying to bring a battery back to their base and defend it long enough for it to allow a machine to brainwash the other team. "Fumigation" had players to capture and hold three gasblasters, a type of command post, to get their gas level to 100%. Players were treated to the sight of the enemy being swarmed by bats (if the Bats won), or suffocated by a poison cloud (if the Jokerz won). In "Bounty Hunter", the players could win the match by collecting coins enemy players drop when they die; they can could pick up teammates' dropped coins to deny the other team points. In "Team Deathmatch", the goal was to kill enemy players as fast as possible. There were also "Challenges"; these were played alone, and were used to master gadgets and earn extra experience. Lastly, there was a training mode called "Initiation", where the Bats' leader instructed the player on how to use weapons and gadgets.

== Development and marketing ==
Batman: Impostors, a storyline that ran through Detective Comics #867-870 (Sept.-Dec. 2010), was inspired by Gotham City Impostors. The premise for the storyline is that the impostor Jokers were created by Winslow Heath, a man who was a victim of Joker venom early in Batman's career as a result of narcotics that he had ingested before he was exposed to the venom. Heath survived the attack, but was left paralyzed while fully conscious for years; his mouth twisted into a permanent duplicate of the Joker's own smile. When he regained full mobility, he discovered that his girlfriend, Beth – who was exposed to the Joker venom under the same circumstances, as the two took the same drugs - was left to die in their apartment as Batman was so caught up in trying to catch the Joker that he never looked back after 'rescuing' Heath, with the result that Beth was left to get eaten alive by crows. Driven insane by the torment that he endured in the hospital, Heath called himself the Impostor Joker and created a unique 'Joker juice' he named Formula 5 that would turn those who used it into temporary duplicates of the Joker with a significant high in the process, simultaneously posing as the Impostor Batman to rally others to also become impostor Batmen, go up against the impostor Jokers and trigger a gang war. Although Batman deduced the truth and defeated Heath (who later escaped), he was left troubled at the implication that Heath was correct in his statement that Batman creates his own villains.

The preview for Cartoon Network's upcoming animation block DC Nation Shorts in 2012 included animation of Gotham City Impostors. Downloadable content was released for all platforms and included new weapons, costumes, and three new stages: the 25th Floor, Arkham Asylum, and the East End.

The game went free-to-play in 2012, but since then no new updates have been released. Due to GameSpy shutting down in May 2014, the servers for the PS3 version were shut down on July 25, and the game is now unplayable.

Gotham City Impostors was removed from Steam in August 2021 and is no longer obtainable.

== Reception ==
Reception

Aggregate score
| Aggregator | Score |
|---|---|
| Metacritic | PC: 65/100; PS3: 72/100; X360: 71/100 |

The Escapist writer Allistair Pinsof called the demo a "carbon copy" of Call of Duty first-person shooter games, but said it added enough new features to be enjoyable. G4 writer Leah Jackson said of the playable demo: "Quite frankly, the game doesn't feel like your run of the mill downloadable title. It controls great, looks fantastic, and with all of the options, I can say that I was quite impressed".

The game scored a 65/100 on Metacritic, indicating "mixed or average" reception. Greg Miller of IGN rated the game a 7/10, calling the game "[...] one-dimensional and straight forward," but felt that aspects such as character customization and usable weapons were "fine" and felt that it was overall "a functional shooter." GameSpot's Jason Venter gave the game a 7.5/10, calling it "a consistently thrilling experience that's easy to recommend" for its combat, arena design, controls, and "fun movement abilities," but criticized the game's matchmaking system.

== See also ==
- DC Nation Shorts
