= Juiced 2: Hot Import Nights =

- PAL cover art featuring Mitsubishi Prototype X
- Developer: Juice Games
- Publisher: THQ
- Directors: Richard Badger; Phil Owen
- Designer: Steven Hunt
- Programmers: Martin Turton; Mat Draper; Rob Anderson; Mark Williams
- Artists: David Ambler; Matthew Green
- Platforms: Xbox 360; PlayStation 2 Nintendo DS; PlayStation Portable; PlayStation 3 Microsoft Windows; Mobile phone
- Release: Xbox 360, PlayStation 2, Nintendo DS: NA: September 17, 2007; AU: September 25, 2007 (DS, X360); AU: September 28, 2007 (PS2); EU: September 28, 2007; PlayStation Portable: NA: October 8, 2007; EU: October 19, 2007; AU: October 25, 2007; PlayStation 3: NA: October 22, 2007; EU: October 26, 2007; AU: November 1, 2007; Microsoft Windows: NA: November 16, 2007; EU: December 7, 2007; AU: December 13, 2007
- Genre: Racing
- Modes: Single-player, multiplayer

Juiced 2: Hot Import Nights is a 2007 racing video game developed by Juice Games and published by THQ, in collaboration with Hot Import Nights magazine. It is the sequel to the 2005 video game Juiced. The PlayStation 2, Xbox 360 and Nintendo DS versions released in September, the PlayStation Portable and PlayStation 3 versions in October, and the Microsoft Windows version in November. The game is loosely based on the auto show of the same name and utilizes more advanced car modification methods compared to its predecessor.

== Gameplay ==
The game begins with two initiation races, before placing the player in a nightclub where they can choose a car to modify, and features 89 cars from licensed manufacturers, including Mazda, Toyota, Nissan and Ford, as well as an extensive modification system. Beginning in the Rookie league, the player must progress through and complete up to 10 different Leagues and their goals, including League 7 - 1, World Class, and HIN Elite. Completing a goal and its unlocked promotional event results in the promotion of the player to the next League. Unlike the first instalment, Juiced 2 does not feature the racing calendar, the respect system and the drag races from Juiced. Juiced 2 only includes two types of racing: circuit and drift.

== Reception ==
Reception

Aggregate score
Aggregator	Score
Metacritic	(PSP) 73/100 (NDS) 72/100 (PS3) 71/100 (X360) 68/100 (PS2) 66/100 (PC) 61/100

Review scores
Publication	Score
Edge	6/10
Eurogamer	6/10
Game Informer	8.25/10
GamePro	3/5
GameSpot	(NDS) 7/10 (X360) 6/10 (PS2) 5.5/10
GameSpy	3.5/5 (PSP) 3/5
IGN	(NDS) 7/10 (PSP/PS2) 6.9/10 (PS3/X360) 6.8/10
Official Xbox Magazine (US)	6.5/10
PC Gamer (UK)	61%
PlayStation: The Official Magazine	6/10

The game received "mixed or average reviews" on all platforms according to video game review aggregator website Metacritic.

One reviewer claimed "the game engine is held together with duct tape" but that overall Juiced 2 is a "cult classic" and "one of a handful of games made for the 7th generation to continue the legacy of the Underground series."
