= Microsoft Flight =

Flight simulation video game by Microsoft Studios

- Developer: Microsoft Game Studios Vancouver
- Publisher: Microsoft Studios
- Designer: Paul Lange
- Composer: Paul Lipson
- Platform: Microsoft Windows
- Release: February 29, 2012
- Genre: Amateur flight simulation
- Modes: Single-player, multiplayer

Microsoft Flight is an amateur flight simulation from Microsoft Studios created as a spin-off of the Microsoft Flight Simulator series. The game is offered "free-to-play"; charging players for downloading extra content, aircraft or scenery.

In July 2012, Microsoft ceased development of the game permanently to re-align its "long-term goals and development plans." The core game, which includes the Icon A5 aircraft and the Big Island of Hawaii scenery area, remained available as a free download for some time after that, but is now no longer available. It could be expanded with additional downloadable content (DLC) from the integrated Games For Windows Marketplace on Xbox-Live .

Microsoft closed the Xbox.com PC Marketplace on August 22, 2013. Previous items purchased are still usable, and the Flight software may still be downloadable, but no items can be acquired through the marketplace.

== Development ==
The game was officially released on February 29, 2012. Previously limited details were released about Flight, but Microsoft suggested that its realism and accuracy will appeal to flying enthusiasts, while new types of gameplay would appeal to newcomers. The game is integrated with the Games for Windows – Live platform, which allows players with Live accounts to join and host multiplayer sessions using a Gamertag. The introduction of Live meant that the GameSpy client would no longer be in use.

It introduced a new model of DLC, integrated with the Games For Windows Marketplace. All Flight add ons can be purchased and installed in-game from a central marketplace. There was no public SDK offered for Flight, with all DLC being developed by Microsoft Studios. On December 1, 2011 a beta application was set up on the website. An announcement was posted on the official Flight Facebook page (on December 13, 2011) stating that an official YouTube channel was published containing the current webisodes. It was announced on January 4, 2012, that it would be free-to-play on release in Spring 2012. On February 6, 2012, it announced that Microsoft Flight would be free to download on February 29, 2012. Also it was announced the first expansion pack would be released on the same day.

== Cancellation ==
On July 25, 2012, Microsoft announced it had cancelled further development of Microsoft Flight, claiming that this was part of "the natural ebb and flow" of application management. Reviewers indicated that sales may have been slow due to competition from other products, such as X-Plane and that Microsoft Flight had fewer aircraft, terrain and third-party add-on options than its predecessor and was less authentic. Microsoft will continue to support the community and offer Flight as a free download.

After announcing the end of development, Microsoft continued to fine-tune the core of the program with a post-release beta test involving Steam users, with title update 1.1.1.30063 released on September 25, 2012. The update contained no new content, just bug fixes.

On August 22, 2013, Microsoft announced the closure of the Xbox PC Marketplace, removing Microsoft Flight and the ability to play it on Steam.

On July 3, 2014, Microsoft announced that Flight was scheduled to be grounded on October 14, 2014, at which time the multiplayer servers were shut down. This affected online features, such as multiplayer and aerocaches; the single-player experience remained largely intact.

== Upgrades ==
A screenshot of Flight released by Microsoft, showing the new lighting/shadowing capabilities of the engine in the aircraft virtual cockpit

Flight features new aircraft, scenery and terrain, a revamped weather engine, and new gameplay elements for users of all skill levels. The new weather engine renders more realistic clouds and weather effects, including fog that blends well with the surrounding terrain, which Microsoft's previous flight simulator releases, (Microsoft Flight Simulator X), were incapable of displaying. As seen in the screenshots, the most noticeable graphical improvements are the newer shader models. Part of the improvement is more realistic lighting and self shadowing on aircraft. The aircraft visual models are much improved over those of the previous flight simulator releases. Flight also features an improved missions system, (over FSX).

=== Downloadable content ===
The core game, which includes the Icon A5 aircraft and the Big Island of Hawaii scenery area, is free to download from the game's website. It can then be expanded with additional downloadable content (DLC) from the integrated Games For Windows Marketplace.

== Reception ==
Reception

Aggregate scores
Aggregator	Score
GameRankings	64.29%
Metacritic	64/100

Review scores
Publication	Score
Eurogamer	6/10
GameSpot	7/10
GameSpy	3.5/5
IGN	5/10
Strategy Informer	7/10

Shortly following release, Microsoft Flight was given a 64/100 critic score on review aggregator site Metacritic.
