= Virtua Tennis 4 =

2011 sports video game

- European cover art
- Developers: Sega; Devil's Details (PC)
- Publisher: Sega
- Producer: Jun Yoshino
- Designer: Mie Kumagai
- Series: Virtua Tennis
- Platforms: PlayStation 3 PlayStation Vita; Xbox 360; Wii; Microsoft Windows; Arcade
- Release: PlayStation 3, Wii, Xbox 360: EU: April 29, 2011; AU: May 5, 2011; NA: May 10, 2011; JP: June 30, 2011 (PS3, X360); Windows: NA: June 24, 2011; AU: July 7, 2011; EU: July 8, 2011; PlayStation Vita: JP: December 17, 2011; NA: February 15, 2012; EU: February 22, 2012; AU: February 23, 2012; Arcade; 2011
- Genre: Sports
- Modes: Single-player, multiplayer
- Arcade system: Sega RingEdge

Virtua Tennis 4, known in Japan as Power Smash 4 (パワースマッシュ4, Pawā Sumasshu 4), is the third sequel to Sega's tennis game franchise, Virtua Tennis. It was released on PlayStation 3, Xbox 360, Microsoft Windows, Wii and PlayStation Vita (the latter as Virtua Tennis 4: World Tour Edition). This is the first main series Virtua Tennis game to not have an arcade release before the console releases. An arcade version was also released, which is powered by the PC-based Sega RingEdge arcade system. There are two versions of the cabinet: an upright 4-player cabinet, and a deluxe 4-player cabinet.

== Gameplay ==
The game supports the PlayStation Move controller on the PlayStation 3, the Kinect on the Xbox 360, and the Wii MotionPlus on the Wii. All previously mentioned devices are optional, although the Wii MotionPlus is required for actual motion-controlled gameplay in the Wii version, which is controlled with the Wii Remote held sideways if the accessory is unavailable. Virtua Tennis 4 allows the player to step into the shoes of some of the world's best tennis pros. The game supports stereoscopic 3D on the PlayStation 3. In the motion control mode of all three console versions, the player's character will automatically move sideways in reaction to where the ball approaches, but the player controls how close they want to be to the net by either holding down a particular button (Wii) or adjusting one's physical distance from the television screen (PS3 and Xbox 360). There is a dynamic camera system in place, so when the ball is in the other half of the court, the camera pans out so that one can see one's position.

When the ball is coming towards the player, it glides into a first person viewpoint where the player can see their racquet in front of him and time their swing accordingly. The player can twist the racquet to adjust its face when it connects with the ball, allowing skilled players to apply spin.

== Players ==
A trailer was released on the YouTube channel of Sega America on January 20, 2011 with a partial list of players that were confirmed for the game. On their blog entry published the same day, the seven new inclusions were revealed for the game.

Six days later, on the Facebook page of the game, the full list of players was released. On 31 March, 3 legends were included to the game, but those are exclusive for PlayStation 3 (along with 2 new mini-games).

As well as these players included in the game, the user has the option to create up to eight of their own players in the World Tour mode.

=== Playable Characters ===
Male

- (Switzerland) Roger Federer
- (Serbia) Novak Djokovic
- (United Kingdom) Andy Murray
- (Spain) Rafael Nadal
- (United States) Andy Roddick
- (Argentina) Juan Martín del Potro
- (France) Gaël Monfils
- (Chile) Fernando González
- (Germany) Tommy Haas
- (Germany) Philipp Kohlschreiber
- (Italy) Andreas Seppi
- (United States) Jim Courier (Unlockable)
- (Germany) Boris Becker (PS3 exclusive unlockable)
- (Sweden) Stefan Edberg (PS3 exclusive unlockable)
- (Australia) Patrick Rafter (PS3 exclusive unlockable)

Female

- (Denmark) Caroline Wozniacki
- (Russia) Maria Sharapova
- (Russia) Svetlana Kuznetsova
- (United States) Venus Williams
- (United Kingdom) Laura Robson
- (Russia) Anna Chakvetadze
- (Serbia) Ana Ivanovic

== Development ==
This is the first game to be developed by the original Virtua Tennis team since 2006.

Despite the fact that Sega opted to skip Gamescom, Virtua Tennis 4 was revealed at the convention at Sony's booth.

== World Tour Edition ==
An updated Vita port, entitled Virtua Tennis 4: World Tour Edition, was released in Japan on December 17, 2011, and was to simultaneously launch with the PlayStation Vita, along with being exclusive to Sony's new handheld.

The World Tour addition included many exclusive features. More mini-games were added, along with touch controllers. The players can also play in first person mode, and control the game using the Vita's gyroscope. Players may use the handheld's front camera to take a photo of their face, and have the game construct a character based on the photo (similar to the mechanics of the game Reality Fighters). After the game downloads the image, the users edit the player in a light character customization screen. Different game templates were also added, allowing the user to play in various time periods, ranging from the early 20th century to one-hundred years in the future.

Two players may now play using the same system, by turning it sideways in the style of Pong, with each participant using a combination of touch control and buttons or analog to play. Augmented reality can be used to bring tennis players featured in the game to life on your system. The users select a player, and have them brought into onto screen, with the background being whatever is facing the second camera on the system.

Online play had also been touched up on, allowing players to share stats, and allowing users to share comments on the other's game home screen.

The game itself was enjoyed by players, critics, and actual tennis players alike (See Reception for more on the reviews). Tennis star Andy Murray stated that he enjoyed the game while playing against a representative from Sega, stating that he found it and entertaining, praised the graphics, and said his in game character was an accurate representation of him.

As of July 2017, Virtua Tennis 4 is the only tennis simulation game available for the PlayStation Vita.

== Reception ==
Reception

Aggregate score
Aggregator	Score				
Aggregator	PC	PS Vita	PS3	Wii	Xbox 360
Metacritic	66/100	77/100	69/100	65/100	70/100

Review scores
Publication	Score				
Publication	PC	PS Vita	PS3	Wii	Xbox 360
Eurogamer	N/A	N/A	8/10	N/A	8/10
Famitsu	N/A	35/40	31/40	N/A	(360) 32/40; 31/40
GamePro	N/A	N/A	3.5/5	N/A	N/A
GameRevolution	N/A	N/A	B−	N/A	B−
GameSpot	N/A	N/A	5.5/10	N/A	5.5/10
GameTrailers	N/A	N/A	N/A	N/A	7.5/10
GameZone	N/A	N/A	N/A	N/A	6/10
IGN	N/A	7.5/10	7/10	7/10	7/10
Jeuxvideo.com	12/20	13/20	12/20	11/20	12/20
Nintendo Power	N/A	N/A	N/A	8/10	N/A
Official Xbox Magazine (US)	N/A	N/A	N/A	N/A	7.5/10
Pocket Gamer	N/A	4/5	N/A	N/A	N/A
PlayStation: The Official Magazine	N/A	8/10	7/10	N/A	N/A
Push Square	N/A	8/10	8/10	N/A	N/A
The Digital Fix	N/A	6/10	N/A	N/A	N/A
Metro	N/A	8/10	7/10	N/A	N/A

The game received "mixed or average reviews" on all platforms except the World Tour Edition, which received "generally favorable reviews", according to the review aggregation website Metacritic. In Japan, Famitsu gave it a score of three nines and one eight for the PlayStation Vita version, and 31 out of 40 for the PS3 and Xbox 360 versions, while Famitsu X360 gave the latter console version a score of 32 out of 40.

GameZone said of the Xbox 360 version, "By and large, Virtua Tennis 4 does adhere strongly to its roots, bringing enough excitement to lure a wider audience. However, it would be useful for a study to be conducted of similar titles, so that these updated features could find their way into the beloved franchise." GameSpot said of the PS3 and Xbox 360 versions, "In almost every respect, Virtua Tennis 4 is outclassed by its rival Top Spin 4" because Virtua Tennis 4 has annoying music, too simple controls and unrealistic sound effects.

The game sold over a million copies.
