= Microsoft Tinker =

2008 video game

Tinker
- Developer: Fuel Industries
- Publisher: Microsoft
- Platforms: Windows XP SP2, SP3; Windows Vista; Windows 7
- Release: September 23, 2008; 17 years ago
- Genre: Puzzle
- Mode: Single-player

Tinker, also known as Microsoft Tinker, is a puzzle video game developed by Fuel Industries in which the player controls a robot through various mazes and obstacle courses. It was originally released on September 23, 2008, as part of Windows Ultimate Extras, and contained 60 levels, including a 20-level tutorial. A free map editor (level builder) was also released; however, it is not compatible with the Games for Windows – Live version of Tinker. It is only compatible with the Windows Ultimate Extras version.

On December 15, 2009, an expanded Live-enabled version of the game was released on the Games for Windows – Live client. The game is available for Windows XP, Windows Vista and Windows 7, including users who do not have access to Windows Vista Ultimate Extras in other Windows Vista editions, and contains 160 levels, including the tutorial. This version also has 15 Achievements worth 200G, similar to many Xbox Live Arcade games. Like every Games for Windows – Live game, it requires the user to sign in using a Gamertag assigned to a Windows Live ID; however, the Windows Vista Ultimate Extras version did not have this requirement.

The Games for Windows – Live version of the game was only available digitally on the Games for Windows Marketplace. It was removed for redemption in 2013, and for download in 2015.

== Gameplay ==
Tinker is a spatial/environmental puzzle game. Players must guide a robot to an end point by moving objects, activating switches, and traversing obstacles. The playing field is a square board divided into a checkerboard pattern. The robot is given a limited number of moves it can make before it runs out of energy, so the player must guide it to the goal marker without expiring all their motions. Essentially any action the robot makes counts as a move, including taking a step, activating a switch, and turning around. Players must carefully plan their actions through a stage so as not to waste moves.

Players can replenish the robot's energy by collecting batteries and thus extend the possible number of moves they are allowed to make. Players can earn an achievement star for a level by completing the course on or under par for time, energy, and cog collection, should any cogs exist on that level.

Obstacles and objects present in levels include:

- Batteries, which give the robot additional energy required to make moves. These come in small and large varieties, with the larger versions providing more energy.
- Cogs, which award the player an achievement star if all are collected on a level.
- The exit, which is a swirling red and white circle similar in appearance to a peppermint candy. It can be moved if it rests on top of a movable block, and can be covered up by an object to be made inaccessible until the object is removed.
- Switches, including flip switches, which must be activated by the robot, and pressure switches, which are only active when an object rests on top of them. These manipulate objects of the same color when activated. Gray objects are always active and cannot be affected by switches. Switches can activate or deactivate laser guns
- Laser guns, which fire beams in a straight line when activated. The beam can destroy the robot, pick-up items, ice blocks, flip switches, or activate magnets and other laser guns.
- Targets, which act as switches that are active when hit by a laser beam.
- Mirrors, which redirect the path of a laser beam in a 90-degree angle.
- Conveyor belts, which can move the robot or any object. While the robot is on a conveyor belt, it can turn but not take any steps. If the end of a conveyor belt is blocked by an object, the robot is free to move once reaching the object.
- Gray blocks and dice blocks, which can be pushed by the robot and differ only in appearance. If anything is on top of the block, it will also move when pushed.
- Colored blocks, which can by pushed by the robot and can activate special square-shaped pressure switches of the same color.
- Metal blocks, which cannot by pushed by the robot but can be moved by magnets.
- Ice blocks, which are similar to gray blocks but can be destroyed by bombs and laser beams.
- Magnets, which pull metal blocks towards them. If a metal block is in the path of multiple activated magnets, only the closest magnet will affect the metal block.
- Barriers, which appear similar to dominoes and block access to an area. If a barrier is activated while an object rests on top of it, the barrier will not rise until the object is moved.
- Bombs, which can be moved by the robot, destroy any adjacent pick-up items, ice blocks, flip switches, magnets, laser guns, targets, and mirrors when activated. Blocks and the robot itself will be moved away by one space if adjacent to an explosion. Bombs can be triggered by switches, laser beams, the explosion of an adjacent bomb, or the robot standing on top of the bomb. Any objects that can be destroyed by a bomb can also be destroyed by the robot falling onto it from above.
- Teleporters, which are circular and numbered, transport any object including the robot to the teleporter of the same number located elsewhere in the level. If an object is already present on the destination teleporter when activated, the objects on both teleporters will switch places.
- Lifts, which look like clothing buttons, can move the robot or an object up or down by one level. Lifts are activated by an increase in pressure; if the robot or an object moves onto a lowered lift, it will raise by one level. If the robot or an object moves onto a raised lift, it will lower by one level. Raised lifts cannot be lowered at their base and become immovable obstacles at ground level.

Movable objects can only be pushed, not pulled, and two or more objects in a row cannot be pushed, even if they are all movable. Objects stacked on top of each other can be pushed if the bottom object is movable (e.g., a tower consisting of two dice blocks and a metal block can be moved only if one of the dice blocks is on the bottom). Attempting to push an immovable object or row of objects will result in a wasted move, though attempting to walk into an obstacle will not waste a move.

The robot can be destroyed or rendered inoperable by being hit by a laser beam, falling from a height greater than two blocks, or running out of energy. If any of the hazards destroy the robot in the process of reaching the exit (e.g., the robot walks into a laser beam which crosses through the exit square), the hazard trumps the exit and the robot is destroyed; however, the level will be completed if the exit is reached with zero energy.

== See also ==
- List of games included with Windows
