= Fuel (video game) =

2009 open world racing video game

- Developer: Asobo Studio
- Publisher: Codemasters
- Platforms: PlayStation 3, Xbox 360, Windows
- Release: PlayStation 3, Xbox 360: NA: 2 June 2009; EU: 5 June 2009; AU: 25 June 2009; Windows: NA: 30 June 2009; EU: 2 July 2009; UK: 3 July 2009
- Genre: Racing
- Modes: Single-player, multiplayer

Fuel (stylized in all uppercase as FUEL) is an open world racing video game developed by Asobo Studio and published by Codemasters. The game was released in North America in June 2009 for PlayStation 3, Xbox 360, and Windows. It is set in a post-apocalyptic United States after the Sun scorched the Earth, with a completely free-to-roam open world approximately 5,560 square miles (14,400 km^{2}) in size, which is roughly the size of the U.S. state of Connecticut. In the free roaming mode, the game features the ability to drive anywhere in the game world without incurring loading times, but crashing a vehicle – or invoking the reset function to return to the road – does invoke a loading screen.

== Gameplay ==
The open world setting of Fuel allows players to seamlessly drive all the way towards and up into the snowy regions of the distant mountains.

Fuel is an open world racing game set in a Mad Max-like post-apocalyptic world ravaged by extreme weather fueled by global warming, with players experiencing varying weather effects such as occasional tornadoes and sandstorms, as well as an accelerated day-night cycle.

The map in which the game takes place is over 14,400 square kilometers large. To generate such a map, Fuel uses procedural generation with a fixed seed, as the map likely wouldn't have fit on the game disk if stored traditionally.

== Development ==
Fuel evolved from a game Asobo Studio announced in 2005, called Grand Raid Offroad.

The award for largest playable area in a console game was awarded to Fuel developer Asobo Studio. Guinness World Records presented the developer with a certificate to commemorate the achievement.

== Reception ==
Reception

Aggregate score
Aggregator	Score		
Aggregator	PC	PS3	Xbox 360
Metacritic	67/100	67/100	66/100

Review scores
Publication	Score		
Publication	PC	PS3	Xbox 360
1Up.com	N/A	C	C
Destructoid	N/A	N/A	7/10
Edge	8/10	8/10	8/10
Eurogamer	N/A	5/10	N/A
Famitsu	N/A	28/40	(X360) 29/40; 28/40
Game Informer	N/A	7.75/10	7.75/10
GamePro	N/A	4/5	N/A
GameSpot	6/10	6/10	6/10
GameTrailers	N/A	5.2/10	N/A
GameZone	N/A	5.9/10	5.9/10
IGN	5.1/10	5.1/10	5.1/10
Official Xbox Magazine (UK)	N/A	N/A	7/10
PC Gamer (UK)	70%	N/A	N/A
PlayStation: The Official Magazine	N/A	4.5/5	N/A
Teletext GameCentral	N/A	N/A	4/10

Fuel received "average" reviews on all platforms according to the review aggregation website Metacritic. Critics praised the graphics and the world design. Many of the rewards available to be unlocked were seen as not worth the effort and the racing mechanics have been noted as sloppy, with the AI opponents leading for most of the race only to slow down towards the end to allow the player to win. In Japan, where the PlayStation 3 and Xbox 360 versions were ported for release on 17 September 2009, Famitsu gave it a score of one eight, one six, one eight, and one six for a total of 28 out of 40, while Famitsu X360 gave the latter console version two sevens, one eight, and one seven for a total of 29 out of 40.
