= Play Anywhere =

Cross-platform video game service

Xbox Play Anywhere, formerly Live Anywhere, is an ongoing initiative by Microsoft's division of Xbox to bring the cross-platform Xbox network (formerly Xbox Live) service to a wide variety of Microsoft platforms and devices, chiefly the Xbox Series X|S, Windows 11, Xbox One, and Windows 10.

== Platforms ==
Platform	Service name	Launched	Discontinued
Windows 11	Xbox network	October 5, 2021	
Xbox Series X/S	Xbox network	November 10, 2020	
Windows 10	Xbox network	July 29, 2015	
Xbox One	Xbox Live	November 22, 2013	
Windows 8 and 8.1	Xbox on Windows	October 26, 2012	Before May 8, 2023
Windows Phone, 10 Mobile	Xbox on Windows Phone	October 21, 2010	Before October 8, 2017
Zune	Zune Social	September 16, 2008	September 4, 2011
Windows XP, Vista, 7	Games for Windows – Live	May 22, 2007	Before May 8, 2023
Xbox 360	Xbox Live	November 22, 2005	July 29, 2024
Xbox	Xbox Live	November 15, 2001	April 15, 2010

== Features ==
- Buy Once, Play Anywhere: Purchase a compatible digital game once and own it on both Xbox and Windows
- Cross-Progression: Game saves and progress sync automatically across devices
- Shared DLC: Downloadable content (DLC) and add-ons are shared between platforms
- Single identity (Gamertag) across all platforms (tied to a Microsoft account)
- Cross-platform chat, with text, voice, and video
- Unified friends list and message system
- Cross-platform multiplayer online gaming, including game invites

== See also ==
- Microsoft Points
- Xbox Game Pass
