= Dead Rising 2: Off the Record =

2011 video game

- Developer: Capcom Vancouver (Note: Additional work, development support, and co-developed by Capcom. PlayStation 4 and Xbox One versions ported by Mercenary Technology)
- Publisher: Capcom
- Producer: Yohei Uchida
- Designers: Brent Arnst; Hayato Tsuru
- Programmer: Francois Chabot
- Artists: Fran Gaulin; Naru Omori; Sho Sakai
- Writer: Annie Reid
- Composer: Oleksa Lozowchuk
- Series: Dead Rising
- Platforms: Microsoft Windows; PlayStation 3; Xbox 360; PlayStation 4; Xbox One
- Release: Microsoft Windows, PlayStation 3, Xbox 360: NA: October 11, 2011; JP: October 13, 2011; AU: October 13, 2011; EU: October 14, 2011; PlayStation 4, Xbox One; September 13, 2016
- Genre: Action-adventure
- Modes: Single-player, multiplayer

Dead Rising 2: Off the Record is a 2011 action-adventure game developed by Capcom Vancouver and published by Capcom. It is a reimagining of Dead Rising 2, with that game's protagonist, Chuck Greene, replaced by Frank West from the first Dead Rising.

== Development and release ==
At Captivate 2011, Capcom's annual press show, the company announced that it was releasing Dead Rising 2: Off the Record, as a reinterpretation of the game, with Frank West from the original Dead Rising as the main character. The game was released for the same consoles on October 11 in North America, October 13 in Japan, and October 14 in Europe for a discount retail price.

Off the Record is intended as a complete reimagining of Dead Rising 2 featuring Frank West, the protagonist of the original Dead Rising video game, with new missions, cutscenes, environments, enemies, and weapons. The photography mechanic from the first Dead Rising is also included. There are technical and system upgrades, such as optimization of loading times and improved network performance. Off the Record also features a new sandbox mode. This allows players to explore Fortune City without the obstacle of time as well as take on several optional challenges.

On September 13, 2016, Capcom re-released the game alongside the original Dead Rising and Dead Rising 2 on Xbox One and PlayStation 4 to coincide with the tenth anniversary of the game.

== Plot ==
As an alternate version of the same story, the plot and gameplay of Off the Record are nearly identical to Dead Rising 2, with several key differences:

- The game now follows Frank, the protagonist of Dead Rising, who replaces Chuck. Frank has squandered his fame since the outbreak and cover-up at Willamette, and after a humiliating appearance on Terror is Reality, he sees the outbreak in Fortune City as an opportunity to resurrect his photojournalism career and "get back in the game." As in Dead Rising, Frank can take pictures of various sights and scenes around the city, acquiring points based on content.
- Following the events of Dead Rising, Frank is still infected with the zombie parasite, and requires an injection of Zombrex every twenty-four hours; if he fails to locate the drug and inject it, he will zombify and the game will end. Unlike Chuck and Katey, Frank can apply Zombrex to himself anywhere in the city.
- The outbreak is now set off by CURE member Brandon, who in turn is being manipulated by TK.
- In addition to new survivors who are exclusive to Off the Record, several survivors from Dead Rising 2 can be found at different locations and times, or require different objectives before they will join Frank.
- Uranus Zone, a science-fiction theme park closed off to the player in Dead Rising 2, is now open to explore.
- Chuck replaces Leon as a Psychopath, driven mad by Katey's death at the beginning of the outbreak.
- There's a new Psychopath, Evan. Evan is an ice cream-themed clown wearing stilts, and the brother of Adam, the clown Psychopath from Dead Rising.
- After the bank robbery, TK kidnaps Rebecca and demands that Frank collect one million dollars as a ransom. Frank must deliver the money before battling Amber and Crystal.
- Given a different character model, Stacey replaces Sullivan as the Phenotrans agent responsible for the outbreak, and the final boss of the game. After she kills Sullivan, Frank faces off against her while she pilots a giant mech in Uranus Zone.
- Rebecca is not fatally wounded at the end of the game; in Ending S, Frank must save her from TK in a scenario similar to Ending S from Dead Rising 2.

As in Dead Rising 2, the player will achieve one of several endings based on time constraints and other factors.

== Reception ==
Reception

Aggregate score
Aggregator	Score
Metacritic	66/100 (PC); 72/100 (PS3); 72/100 (X360)

Review scores
Publication	Score
Game Informer	9.5/10
GameSpot	7/10
GameTrailers	8.2/10
IGN	7/10
VideoGamer.com	7/10

Off The Record received "mixed or average" reviews, with a score of 72/100 on Metacritic for the Xbox 360 and PlayStation 3 respectively. The PC version got a 66/100 on Metacritic. Gametrailers gave the game an overall rating of 8.2 out of 10. IGN gave it a 7 out of 10, stating: "If you've never played a Dead Rising game before, Off The Record is just about worth its budget price tag. But if you've already spent considerable time with Dead Rising 2, however, there's little new content on offer to justify another visit to Fortune City." GameSpot gave the title a 7 out of 10 rating, praising the core game but criticizing the lack of improvements and the sandbox mode's perceived lack of depth. Game Informer, by contrast, gave the game a 9.5/10 (the same score as the original) saying that "Frank's photography adds another layer to the already deep gameplay," and that "by itself, the sandbox mode is an incentive to buy Dead Rising 2." Videogamer.com gave the game a 7 out of 10, Neon Kelly writes, "If you're a massive fan of the series - and of Frank West in particular - it's still worth picking this up, but even at twenty notes, there's little to make this an urgent purchase."
