= Stormrise =

2009 video game

- Developer: Creative Assembly
- Publisher: Sega
- Composer: Jeff van Dyck
- Platforms: PlayStation 3, Xbox 360, Microsoft Windows
- Release: NA: 24 March 2009; AU: 26 March 2009; EU: 27 March 2009
- Genre: Real-time tactics
- Modes: Single-player, multiplayer

Stormrise is a 2009 real-time tactics video game developed by Creative Assembly's Australian studio and published by Sega for Microsoft Windows, PlayStation 3, and Xbox 360. It is set in a post-apocalyptic world.

== Gameplay ==
The game is a real-time tactics game, with the ability to control units in the air, on the surface, and underground.

== Story ==
In the near future, a network of orbital weather control satellites was created to prevent an environmental disaster, but the satellites malfunctioned, triggering a catastrophic event known as simply "The Event", in which firestorms ravaged the surface of the Earth. A select few were chosen to go into cryogenic stasis and rebuild society, while the rest were left to die. After a few decades, two civilizations began to emerge. Those who went into stasis would reawaken and form the technologically advanced Echelon, while those who were left behind would adapt to the new environment and become the tribal Mutant Sai. the protagonist is commander geary who faced the leader of the sai meridian

=== Factions ===
The Echelon: A technologically advanced race that endured the planet's fallout by way of cryogenic stasis.

The Sai: A tribal society that adapted to the new environment and evolved.

== Development ==
Stormrise was in development at Creative Assembly's Australian studio and was released for the Xbox 360, Microsoft Windows, and PlayStation 3 in March 2009. The Windows version requires Windows Vista as the engine has been built on and designed around DirectX 10.1.

== Critical reception ==
Reception

Aggregate score
Aggregator	Score		
Aggregator	PC	PS3	Xbox 360
Metacritic	42/100	51/100	48/100

Review scores
Publication	Score		
Publication	PC	PS3	Xbox 360
1Up.com	N/A	D	D
Edge	N/A	N/A	4/10
Eurogamer	N/A	3/10	N/A
Game Informer	N/A	4/10	4/10
GameSpot	2/10	2.5/10	2.5/10
GameZone	N/A	N/A	7.9/10
IGN	2.1/10	(AU) 6.6/10 (US) 4.9/10	(AU) 6.6/10 (US) 4.9/10
Official Xbox Magazine (UK)	N/A	N/A	6/10
PC Gamer (UK)	35%	N/A	N/A
PlayStation: The Official Magazine	N/A	3.5/5	N/A
Teletext GameCentral	N/A	N/A	2/10

The PlayStation 3 version received "mixed" reviews, while the PC and Xbox 360 versions received "generally unfavorable reviews", according to the review aggregation website Metacritic.

== Patch cancellation and departure of staff ==
Development of the second patch was cancelled on 28 April 2009 one month after release. Creative Assembly indicated that the cancellation was due to the financial costs associated with testing and certifying the new changes and features.

The critical response and low sales have been cited as being factors in the financial decision.

Following the cancellation of the patch, Ken Turner, the creative director behind Stormrise, was released from the studio.
