= Osmos =

2009 video game

- Steam digital banner art
- Developer: Hemisphere Games
- Publishers: Hemisphere Games; Microsoft Game Studios (GFWL)
- Designer: Eddy Boxerman
- Platforms: Microsoft Windows; Mac OS X Linux; OnLive iOS; Android
- Release: 18 August 2009: Windows; 18 August 2009; Mac OS X; 10 December 2009; Linux; 15 June 2010; iPad; 8 July 2010; iPhone; 5 August 2010; Android; 17 January 2012
- Genre: Puzzle
- Modes: Single-player, multiplayer

Osmos is a 2009 puzzle video game developed by Canadian developer Hemisphere Games for various systems such as Microsoft Windows, Mac OS X, Linux, OnLive, iPad, iPhone, iPod Touch and Android. It was designed by Eddy Boxerman, founder of Hemisphere and a former developer at Ubisoft Montreal.

== Gameplay ==
The goal of most levels is to absorb enough motes to become the largest on the level.

The aim of the game is to propel oneself, a single-celled organism ("Mote"), into other smaller motes to absorb them. Colliding with a mote larger than the player will cause the player to be absorbed, resulting in a game over. Motes smaller than the player are blue, while motes bigger than the player are red. Changing course is done by expelling mass. Due to conservation of momentum, this results in the player's mote moving away from the expelled mass, but also in one's own mote shrinking.

There are three different "zones" of levels in Osmos: In the "sentient" levels, the goal is to prevail over active motes of various types that hunt and absorb other motes, including the player. Hunting them typically involves absorbing as many inactive motes as possible before chasing down the active ones with the extra mass one has gained.

In the "ambient" levels, the player's mote typically floats in a large area surrounded by inactive motes, and must become the largest or simply very large. Variations on this theme involve, for instance, starting the game as a very small mote surrounded by many larger, fast moving motes, or the presence of "antimatter" motes which shrink normal motes during collision no matter which one was originally bigger, or starting the game stuck in a huge, densely packed area with a large number of other motes without much space to move about and having to nudge other motes out of the way by ejecting mass at them.

In the "force" levels, special motes ("Attractors") influence other motes with a force similar to gravitation. The player has to take into account orbital physics when planning movement in order to save mass when changing course. In these levels, the game optionally assists the player with a course trajectory tool that plots the mote's course, up to a short time in the future. Force levels are complicated in various ways, including levels with mutually repelling attractors, attractors bouncing randomly around an area full of motes, several "strata" of bodies in retrograde rotation about an attractor, and attractors orbiting other attractors.

A multiplayer version of Osmos for iOS was released in July 2012.

== Soundtrack ==
The soundtrack includes:

1. Vincent et Tristan – "Osmos Theme"
2. Gas – "Discovery"
3. Biosphere – "Antennaria" (from Substrata)
4. Loscil – "Lucy Dub"
5. Loscil – "Rorschach"
6. Loscil – "Sickbay"
7. High Skies – "The Shape of Things to Come"
8. Julien Neto – "From Cover to Cover"
9. Julien Neto – "Farewell"

A free download of many of the tracks was made available in March 2010.

== Reception ==
Reception

Aggregate score
Aggregator	Score	
Aggregator	iOS	PC
Metacritic	(2) 90/100 (1) 88/100	80/100

Review scores
Publication	Score	
Publication	iOS	PC
The A.V. Club	N/A	A−
Destructoid	N/A	8.5/10
Eurogamer	(1) 9/10	N/A
GamePro	(1) 4.5/5	N/A
GameSpot	N/A	7/10
Gamezebo	(2) 4.5/5	4.5/5
IGN	9/10	8.5/10
Macworld	(1) 5/5	N/A
PC Gamer (US)	N/A	80%
Pocket Gamer	4/5	N/A

The iPhone version received "universal acclaim", while the PC and iPad versions received "generally favourable reviews", according to the review aggregation website Metacritic.

At IndieCade in 2009, the PC version was named "Best in Show" and won the Fun/Compelling award. Apple Inc. selected the game as the iPad game of the year for 2010. It also won many other awards that year. IGN awarded the iOS version its best video game soundtrack of 2010.
