= Insanely Twisted Shadow Planet =

2011 video game

- Developer: Shadow Planet Productions (Fuelcell Games/Gagne International)
- Publisher: Microsoft Studios
- Designers: Michel Gagné; Joe Olson
- Composers: Andrew Scott; Dimmu Borgir
- Platforms: Xbox 360; Microsoft Windows; OS X Linux
- Release: Xbox 360 (XBLA); August 3, 2011; Windows; April 17, 2012; OS X, Linux; October 28, 2014
- Genres: Multidirectional shooter Metroidvania
- Modes: Single-player multiplayer

Insanely Twisted Shadow Planet is a shooter puzzle video game developed by Shadow Planet Productions (Fuelcell Games/Gagne International) and published by Microsoft Studios for Xbox 360 and Microsoft Windows. A self-published DRM-free version with soundtrack included was featured in the Humble Indie Bundle 13.

== Development ==
The game is a collaboration between animator Michel Gagné and game designer Joe Olson and takes inspiration from Gagné's "Insanely Twisted Shadow Puppets", a series of interstitials he did for Nickelodeon in 2005. The two first met when Gagné was giving a workshop for Midway Games in Seattle, and Olson, having seen the Nickelodeon shorts, asked Gagné if he'd be interested in collaborating. Gagné was unfamiliar with the medium, only knowing games up to 1993's Doom; however, he was eager and told Olson that he'd do research and get back to him. Olson, however, saw Gagne's nativity as an asset and told him that he would provide help from the gameplay side. Olson stated he "wanted to use the power of modern consoles to drive feature-quality animation." Initially the team worked on the game in their spare time, which led to them working on the game "only about three or four days a month" leading them to eventually quit their day jobs in order to focus on Shadow Planet full time The team consisting of Gagné, Olson and Olson's development team initially worked out of a basement. Development began in 2007 and most of 2008 was spent with the group performing contract work in order to be able to rent an office.

The game was eventually picked up by Microsoft, Microsoft had originally passed after seeing an early prototype however after the release of the second trailer they changed their mind. The game was first demonstrated in March 2011 at Penny Arcade Expo East. The game is set on an alien planet and includes exploration elements similar to Metroidvania. Insanely Twisted Shadow Planet was released on August 3, 2011. The game features music by Dimmu Borgir during cinematics; the songs "Progenies of the Great Apocalypse" (orchestral version) and "Eradication Instincts Defined" play during the game, while the trailer featured "Blood Hunger Doctrine".

=== Expansions ===
The Shadow Hunters expansion was released on Xbox Live Arcade on October 12, 2011. It expands on the Lantern Run mode in the base game, allowing players to team up in a continuation of the storyline. Shadow Hunters was included for free in the PC port of the game. Local and online multiplayer are supported in Lantern Run and the Shadow Hunters DLC.

== Reception ==
Reception

Aggregate score
Aggregator	Score
Metacritic	(PC) 76/100 (X360) 76/100

Review scores
Publication	Score
Destructoid	6/10
Edge	6/10
Eurogamer	6/10
Game Informer	8/10
GamePro	4/5
GameSpot	7.5/10
GameTrailers	8.4/10
Giant Bomb	4/5
IGN	8/10
Joystiq	4/5
Official Xbox Magazine (US)	8/10
PC Gamer (UK)	78%
Digital Spy	4/5
Metro	6/10

The PC and Xbox 360 versions received "generally favorable reviews" according to the review aggregation website Metacritic. James Stephanie Sterling of Destructoid noted the Xbox 360 version as an "attempt to run in multiple directions at once and make very little ground at all" and concluded: "Sadly, great visuals do not make a great game."

Justin Clouse of The Escapist gave the same console version a score of four stars out of five and called it "good fun, with striking visuals and a great setting. A few issues keep it from being totally brilliant though." Liam Martin of Digital Spy gave it a similar score of four stars, saying, "The stylish visuals compliment the well-executed action, resulting in a game that resembles past SOA favorites Limbo and Shadow Complex." Todd Vote of 411Mania gave it a score of 7.8 out of 10, calling it "a very unique take on the old formula of side scrolling shooters. While it doesn't really do anything wrong, aside from the art style, it doesn't really do anything to stand out either. It is a fun engaging experience, but once you are done with the game, that is all she wrote. There is not really much incentive to go back and keep playing other than a less than exciting Lantern Runs. The game ends up being satisfying, but falling shy of being incredible in most parts." Christian Williams of The A.V. Club gave it a B, saying, "While the campaign could use more of that urgency, ITSP is a perfectly polished, bite-size shooter that returns us, however briefly, to a long-neglected sector of the gaming universe." However, Roger Hargeaves of Metro gave it six out of ten, saying, "It copies and borrows from the best - and often very well - but competence is no substitute for character in this forgettable 2D adventure." The game received a 8.5/10 from the review aggregation website, N4G, which features video game reviews from around the world.

=== Awards ===
British Academy Award (BAFTA) for Best Debut Game

Annie Award for Best Animated Game

Navigatr (National Academy of Video Game Testers and Reviewers) for Best Original Light Mix Score

Video Game Award (nomination) for Best Downloadable

Interactive Achievement Award (nomination) for Downloadable Game of the Year

Annual Game Music Award (nomination) for Outstanding Achievement Licensed Music (Dimmu Borgir)
