= Index of Windows games (I) =

This is an index of Microsoft Windows games.

This list has been split into multiple pages. Please use the Table of Contents to browse it.

Title	Released	Developer	Publisher
I Am Alive	2012	Darkworks, Ubisoft Shanghai	Ubisoft
I Have No Mouth, and I Must Scream	2013	The Dreamers Guild	Cyberdreams
I of the Dragon	2002	Primal Software	Strategy First
I Spy Spooky Mansion	2005	Scholastic	Scholastic
I Wanna Be the Guy	2007	Michael "Kayin" O'Reilly	
I'm O.K – A Murder Simulator	2005	Thompsonsoft	Thompsonsoft
I-Ninja	2003	Argonaut Games	Namco, Zoo Digital Publishing
I-War	1997	Particle Systems	Infogrames
I.G.I.-2: Covert Strike	2003	Innerloop Studios	Codemasters
Ice & Fire	1995	AnimaTek	GT Interactive
Iced!	2008	Breakthrough	Breakthrough
Icewind Dale	2000	Black Isle Studios	Interplay Entertainment
Icewind Dale II	2002	Black Isle Studios	Interplay Entertainment
Icewind Dale: Enhanced Edition	2014	Overhaul Games	Atari, Beamdog
Icewind Dale: Heart of Winter	2001	Black Isle Studios	Interplay Entertainment
Ignition	1997	Unique Development Studios	Virgin Interactive
IHRA Drag Racing	2000	Digital Dialect	Bethesda Softworks
IHRA Drag Racing: Sportsman Edition	2006	Bethesda Game Studios	Bethesda Softworks
IL-2 Sturmovik	2001	1C:Maddox Games	1C, Ubisoft
IL-2 Sturmovik: Forgotten Battles	2003	1C:Maddox Games	1C, Ubisoft
Immaterial and Missing Power	2004	Twilight Frontier, Team Shanghai Alice	Twilight Frontier, Team Shanghai Alice
Immortal Cities: Children of the Nile	2004	Tilted Mill Entertainment	Myelin Media, SEGA
Immortal: Unchained	2018	Toadman Interactive	Game Odyssey Ltd
Immortals Fenyx Rising	2020	Ubisoft Quebec	Ubisoft
Immortals of Aveum	2023	Ascendant Studios	Electronic Arts
Imogen	2003	Ovine by Design	Ovine by Design
Imperator: Rome	2019	Paradox Development Studio	Paradox Interactive
Imperial Glory	2005	Pyro Studios	Eidos Interactive
Imperialism	1997	Frog City Software	Strategic Simulations, Inc.
Imperialism II: Age of Exploration	1999	Frog City Software	Strategic Simulations, Inc.
Imperishable Night	2004	Team Shanghai Alice	Team Shanghai Alice
Imperium Galactica II: Alliances	1999	Digital Reality	GT Interactive
Imperium Romanum	2008	Haemimont Games	Kalypso Media, SouthPeak Games
Imperivm: Great Battles of Rome	2004	Haemimont Games	FX Interactive
Impire	2013	Cyanide	Paradox Interactive
Impossible Creatures	2003	Relic Entertainment	Microsoft Game Studios
Impossible Spell Card	2014	Team Shanghai Alice	Team Shanghai Alice
Impressionists	1997	Index+	Index+
In Cold Blood	2000	Revolution Software	Ubisoft, DreamCatcher Games
In Memoriam	2003	Lexis Numerique	Ubisoft, The Adventure Company
In Sound Mind	2021	We Create Stuff	Modus Games
In the Groove	2004	Roxor Games	Roxor Games, RedOctane
In the Hunt	1997	Kokopeli	Kokopeli
Incoming	1998	Rage Software	Rage Software, Xicat Interactive, Imagineer
Incoming Forces	2002	Rage Software	Hip Interactive
The Incredible Hulk	2008	Edge of Reality	Sega
The Incredible Machine 2	1995	Dynamix	Sierra On-Line
The Incredibles	2004	Heavy Iron Studios	THQ, D3, Capcom
The Incredibles: Rise of the Underminer	2005	Yuke's, Pacific Coast Power & Light	THQ, Capcom
Incubation: Time Is Running Out	1997	Blue Byte	Blue Byte
Independence Day	1997	Radical Entertainment	Fox Interactive
Independence War 2: Edge of Chaos	2001	Particle Systems	Infogrames
Indiana Jones and the Emperor's Tomb	2003	The Collective	LucasArts
Indiana Jones and the Great Circle	2024	MachineGames	Bethesda Softworks
Indiana Jones and the Infernal Machine	1999	LucasArts	LucasArts, THQ
Indie Pogo	2018	Lowe Bros. Studios	Lowe Bros. Studios
Industry Giant	1998	JoWood Productions	Interactive Magic
Industry Giant II	2002	JoWood Productions	JoWood Productions
IndustryMasters	2007	Thomas Lehnert	Tycoon Sistemas Ltda
IndyCar Series	2003	Codemasters	Codemasters
Infantry	1999	Harmless Games LLC	Sony Online Entertainment
Infernal	2007	Metropolis Software	Playlogic International
Infinity Online	2006	Windysoft	game & game
Inherit the Earth	2003	The Dreamers Guild	Wyrmkeep Entertainment
Injustice 2	2017	NetherRealm Studios, QLOC	Warner Bros. Interactive Entertainment
Injustice: Gods Among Us	2013	NetherRealm Studios, High Voltage Software	Warner Bros. Interactive Entertainment
InkBall	2004	Microsoft	Microsoft
Innova Disc Golf	2000	Sundial Interactive	WizardWorks
Inquisition	2003	Wanadoo Edition	Wanadoo Edition
The Inquisitor	2024	The Dust	Kalypso Media
Insane	2000	Invictus Games	Codemasters
Insaniquarium	2004	Flying Bear Entertainment	PopCap Games
Insecticide	2008	Crackpot Entertainment, Creat Studios, Inc.	Gamecock Media Group
Inside	2016	Playdead	Playdead
Instruments of Destruction	2024	Radiangames	Radiangames
Insurgency: Modern Infantry Combat	2007	Insurgency Team	Valve
Intellivision Lives!	1998	Intellivision Productions	Intellivision Productions
International Cricket Captain	1998	Empire Interactive	Empire Interactive
International Rally Championship	1997	Magnetic Fields	Interplay Entertainment, THQ, Europress
International Superstar Soccer 3	2003	KCEO	Konami
Interpol: The Trail of Dr. Chaos	2007	TikGames	Sierra Online
Interstate '76	1997	Activision	Activision
Interstate '82	1999	Activision	Activision
Into the Stars	2016	Fugitive Games	Iceberg Interactive
Invention Studio	1996	Music Pen	Discovery Channel Multimedia
Inversion	2012	Saber Interactive	Bandai Namco Entertainment
The Invincible	2023	Starward Industries	11 Bit Studios
Iron Brigade	2012	Double Fine Productions	Microsoft Studios, Double Fine Productions
Iron Grip: Warlord	2008	Isotx	Isotx
Iron Harvest	2020	King Art Games	Deep Silver
Iron Lung	2022	David Szymanski	David Szymanski, Dread XP
Iron Man	2008	Artificial Mind and Movement	Sega
Iron Storm	2002	4X Studio, Kylotonn	Dreamcatcher Interactive, Wanadoo Edition
Iron Warriors: T-72 Tank Commander	2004	IDDK/Crazy House	Battlefront.com
Ironclads: American Civil War	2008	Totem Games	Totem Games
Island Xtreme Stunts	2002	Silicon Dreams Studio	Lego Software
Islands of Insight	2024	Lunarch Studios	Behaviour Interactive
Istaria: Chronicles of the Gifted	2003	Artifact Entertainment	Artifact Entertainment, Virtrium LLC, Tulga Games, LLC, EI Interactive
Itaike na Kanojo	2003	Zero	Visual Art's
The Italian Job	2001	Pixelogic	SCi, Global Star Software
Ixion	2022	Bulwark Studios	Kalypso Media
