= Tropico (video game) =

2001 simulation video game

- Developers: PopTop Software; Feral Interactive (Mac)
- Publishers: Gathering of Developers (Windows); MacSoft (Mac); Feral Interactive (Mac)
- Producer: Joshua Galloway
- Designers: Phil Steinmeyer; Franz Felsl
- Programmers: Brent Smith; Phil Steinmeyer
- Artists: David Deen; Todd Bergantz; Franz Felsl; Brian Feldges; Steve Mohesky
- Writer: Fanz Felsl
- Composer: Daniel Indart
- Series: Tropico
- Platforms: Windows, Mac OS X
- Release: Windows: CAN: April 21, 2001; USA: April 24, 2001; UK: April 27, 2001; Mac OS X: NA: July 17, 2001; EU: 2001
- Genre: Construction and management simulation
- Mode: Single player

Tropico is a construction and management simulation video game developed by PopTop Software and published by Gathering of Developers in April 2001. Feral Interactive has developed and published a number of the games in the series for Mac OS X. The games see the player taking the role of "El Presidente", who rules a fictional Caribbean island country named Tropico during the Cold War era and beyond.

The game is tongue-in-cheek in its presentation of semi-democratic banana republics, using a great deal of humor while still referencing such topics as totalitarianism, electoral fraud, and the interventions of powerful companies (United Fruit is implied) and the Cold War superpowers (the United States and Soviet Union). This is similar to the previous 8bit Game Dictator by DK'Tronics, except in Dictator the success is measured by the amount you put away in your Swiss bank account, which is an offshore bank account.

Tropico features Latin-styled Caribbean music, largely performed by Daniel Indart. The game won the "Original Musical Composition" award during the 5th Annual Interactive Achievement Awards.

Tropico has several expansion packs and new editions, including Tropico: Paradise Island, plus a combined copy of the original and Paradise Island titled Tropico: Mucho Macho Edition (released on June 27, 2002). A sequel, Tropico 2: Pirate Cove, was released on April 8, 2003. The third game in the series Tropico 3, was released in the autumn of 2009. A fourth game, Tropico 4, was released on August 26, 2011, and a fifth game, Tropico 5, was released on May 23, 2014. Tropico 6 was released on March 29, 2019.

The game was re-released in the three-game pack Tropico Reloaded, packing the original game, the expansion pack Tropico: Paradise Island, and the sequel Tropico 2: Pirate Cove into one release. It is available both digitally on Steam and GOG.com, and on disc.

== Gameplay ==
A screenshot depicting the strategy-oriented gameplay

Regardless of any other stated victory condition, the main goal of any Tropico game is to stay in power. If the island's populace disapproves of the player's actions, they may vote their leader out of office. Individual factions and powers can also end or disrupt El Presidente's rule. Rebels can defeat the army and storm the Presidential palace. If the army is dissatisfied, it can stage a coup d'état.

If "El Presidente" manages to stay in positive view of the Soviet Union and the United States they will supply him with foreign aid money. If either of the Cold War superpowers becomes unhappy with the player's regime, it may launch an invasion to overthrow it. The superpowers may build a military base on Tropico, protecting the island from the other and offering monthly payments. If an army base is established in the country, it may ask for specific tasks, and low satisfaction will lead them to overthrow "El Presidente".

Tropico can be played in two gameplay modes: scenario or custom game/random map. Scenarios are predetermined game conditions with defined goals that must be accomplished in order to win. The game includes several scenarios, each with a stated level of difficulty. Custom games allow virtually all starting conditions to be controlled. The player can customize the map of the island, adjusting its size and steepness to personal preference. Many other aspects of gameplay, such as political and economic difficulty, can also be customized to make the game easier or more difficult. The custom game also allows the player to choose how many game years the simulation will run for (a minimum of 10 years, a maximum of 70 with the game basically run 1950 to 2000), and what conditions will determine victory (if any). The game also includes a tutorial level, which teaches the player the game mechanics and controls of the game.

The player is able to issue a number of governmental edicts, some of which require funding or the availability of particular buildings. Edicts are used to achieve various game effects, from appeasing one of the superpowers by openly praising them, to instating martial law or giving a tax break to the populace.

Before starting a custom game, the player may either design their own "El Presidente" character or select one from a list of pre-made leaders. These include real-life figures such as Che Guevara, Fidel Castro, and Augusto Pinochet, fictional rulers such as Hernando Blanco and Sancho Baraega. Lou Bega, who is a pop musician commonly known at the time for the song "Mambo No. 5", is also available as a dictator persona. After the player has chosen a leader, the player can customize their profile by specifying the strengths and flaws of their character's personality, the means by which they came into power and their social background. These choices affect the attitudes of factions and superpowers towards the player, and can also alter the costs or consequences of in-game actions.

The game calculates a score for the player at the end of the game. This score is based on a variety of factors, including the happiness of the island's citizens, the health of the island's economy, how much money the player has set aside for their retirement in a Swiss bank account, and the level of difficulty chosen at the start of the game.

=== Politics and factions ===
While "El Presidente" has absolute rule over the lives of the Tropican people, politics play an important role in gameplay. The player must decide whether to hold free elections, attempt to manipulate the election by intimidating voters, or to dispense with any pretense of democracy and run the island as a dictatorship. These decisions will have direct effects on the Tropican people's happiness, liberty, and respect for the leader. Often the player is judged on "democracy expectations" versus "democracy results", which will influence the public's opinion of their leadership. Having free elections increases the respect of El Presidente among the population, but if their support gets too low, there is the risk of El Presidente losing the elections and being forced to resign. A successful leader will have to either meet the needs of the populace, the political factions, and the wider political world, or establish and police a totalitarian military dictatorship and watch the army carefully.

If pushed enough the Tropican people may choose to rebel against "El Presidente", conducting guerrilla attacks against various buildings on the island; if the rebellion grows strong enough this will result in the overthrow of the player. A sufficiently dissatisfied military will likely instigate a coup. Often threats to power can be measured based on a unit's leadership qualities and his courage. For example, a citizen with poor leadership but strong courage may not be likely to start a rebellion but may be willing to join it.

Most Tropicans are aligned into several conflicting political factions, with some citizens being a member of one or more such factions:

- Communists: Generally one of the larger factions, they are most concerned with adequate housing, healthcare and employment for the masses, and low pay disparities between workers on the island. They also prefer a pro-Soviet foreign policy.
- Capitalists: They stand in opposition to the communists and are a small, but influential faction. They are concerned with economic development, the provision of expensive luxuries, low crime rates for the island, and prefer a pro-American foreign policy.
- Religious: One of the larger factions on the island. This is due to the high value that many Tropicans place on their faith. They often are concerned with access to and quality of religious institutions on the island, as well as the island's morality. Appeasing them can often result in major reductions in liberty as they are swayed by edicts such as "Book BBQ", "Prohibition", "Birth Control Ban", and "Inquisition". The religious faction tends to be led by either a priest or bishop. Having cathedrals and churches on the island encourages the growth of this faction (when citizens go to church they become more religious), but having not enough of them can keep this faction's size down, though its few members will oppose the government.
- Intellectuals: This is one of the smallest factions on the island and tends to have the most detractors. They are most concerned with access to education as well as maintaining a standard of liberty on the island. They can be one of the hardest factions to please and occasionally pose a threat to power, especially if the player is running an authoritarian regime. Their faction is often led by a professor or teacher.
- Militarists: This is a medium-sized but powerful faction mainly concerned with the size and well-being of the island's military. They are one of the biggest threats to power, as armed members of this faction may launch a coup against the player. Prioritizing the militarists' support may result in a decrease in liberty and can cause non-militarists to rebel. The militarist faction is generally led by a soldier or general.
- Environmentalists: A very small faction. They are most concerned with the natural beauty of the island and reducing pollution. As such, they oppose logging and mining operations as well as most industry. Often they are in direct conflict with the interests of the capitalists or the communists. The leader can appease them by building garbage dumps to contain pollution, or issuing edicts relating to the environment, such as an anti-litter ordinance, but this will generally result in increased maintenance costs and decreased productivity. They can be pleased by frequent planting of trees (which can be done along the sides of roads prior to those roads being completed).

Factions can be manipulated both positively and negatively mainly through edicts and buildings. For example, the player may choose to bribe the leaders of factions to attempt to curry their favor or, if the factions' leaders become too much of a threat, he can have them assassinated or imprisoned. The island's media outlets can be directed to distribute propaganda for a particular faction, and schools can be either parochial or military in nature.

== Development ==
The game was developed in 23 months.

=== Origin ===
The Banana Republic idea was the first of these that we agreed on. It was original, though not radical. Everyone likes building games, but the two predominant models, set out by Civilization and SimCity, have been cloned to death. This would be a fresh take on the building game concept. Moreover, the Latin American setting provides a rich background for the political side of the game. Building a prosperous country in and of itself is not enough – you’ve got to bribe your generals and repress your dissidents to avoid a coup-d'etat or a mass uprising.

The singer Lou Bega was included as part of a licensing deal that also saw one of Bega's songs integrated into the German release of Tropico.

=== Expansion pack ===
After the completion of Tropico, Steinmeyer was uninterested in developing further games in the series. However, later in 2001, Take-Two Interactive requested an expansion pack to capitalize on the game's success.

== Reception ==
=== Sales ===
Tropico was a commercial success; Geoff Keighley of Computer Gaming World declared it one of Gathering of Developers' few "certified hits". In the United States, it claimed fifth place on NPD Intelect's computer game sales chart for the week of April 22. It placed sixth the following two weeks, before holding at tenth for the May 13 – June 2 period. On NPD Intelect's monthly charts, Tropico took places nine and 19 in May and June, respectively. According to NPD, the game sold 67,000 copies in the United States by October 2001.

According to Phil Steinmeyer, the game's highest sales came from "the U.S., Germany, and Britain, respectively", in its first seven weeks. He noted that Tropico did not fall from the top 10 of these markets' computer game sales charts during the period, and that it reached #1 on Germany's chart. As of November 2007, Tropico had sold 1 million copies in total.

=== Critical reviews ===
Reception

Aggregate scores
Aggregator	Score
GameRankings	PC: 83%
Metacritic	PC: 85/100 iOS: 86/100

Review scores
Publication	Score
Computer Games Magazine	4 out of 5
Computer Gaming World	3.5 out of 5
Game Informer	9.25 out of 10
Next Generation	4 out of 5
PC Gamer (US)	77%
X-Play	4 out of 5
MacHome Journal	4 out of 5
TouchArcade	iOS: 5 out of 5

John Lee of Next Generation summarized, "Tropico tends to be slow, with no tedium-breaking clash of arms like other city builders, but there's enough innovation to give it charm." In Game Informer, Kristian Brogger praised the game's visuals, music and "wonderfully intuitive camera system". He called the game "an absolute must-have for anyone who found anything from SimCity to Zeus even moderately interesting."

Tropico received the "Outstanding Achievement in Original Musical Composition" award from the Academy of Interactive Arts & Sciences during the 5th Annual Interactive Achievement Awards. It also won the "Best Music" awards from Computer Games Magazine, Computer Gaming World and GameSpot. Computer Gaming World's staff called the score "brilliant" and summarized it as "easily the year's most evocative soundtrack". Tropico was also nominated for GameSpot's "Best Single-Player Strategy Game" and The Electric Playground's "Best Strategy Game for PC" awards, which ultimately went to Civilization III and Etherlords, respectively.

=== Paradise Island ===
Reception

Aggregate scores
Aggregator	Score
GameRankings	79%
Metacritic	78/100

Review scores
Publication	Score
Computer Games Magazine	3.5 out of 5
Computer Gaming World	2.5 out of 5
Game Informer	7.5 out of 10
X-Play	4 out of 5

The Paradise Island expansion pack adds new in-game music, more edicts, and new buildings, especially factories and tourism-related facilities. It also acts as a patch, fixing problems in the original game release. As a result, buildings can now be rotated, fully refunded if cancelled prior to construction, and the construction process is now significantly faster.

== Trivia ==
The Presidential Palace, main building of the game, is modeled after the Palacio del Valle in Cuba.

== Legacy ==
Tropico was followed by a sequel, Tropico 2: Pirate Cove, in 2003. While PopTop remained involved as the sequel's producer, the game was developed by Frog City Software. Tropico 2 was the final game in the series to be published by Take-Two Interactive. No further entries were greenlit until November 2008, when Kalypso Media bought the Tropico intellectual property from Take-Two and announced Tropico 3, developed by Bulgaria's Haemimont Games. The game was released in 2009. Afterward, Haemimont Games developed Tropico 4 (2011) and Tropico 5 (2014), both published by Kalypso. Tropico 6, developed by Limbic Entertainment and published again by Kalypso Media, was announced in June 2017 and released on March 29, 2019. In December 2020, Realmforge Studios announced that it would take over its future development of the series. Tropico 7 was announced in August 2025 and is scheduled for release sometime in 2026.
