= Tropico 2: Pirate Cove =

2003 video game

Tropico 2: Pirate Cove!
- Tropico 2: Pirate Cove box art
- Developers: Frog City Software (Note: Additional development by PopTop Software); Westlake Interactive (Mac)
- Publishers: Gathering; MacSoft (Mac)
- Designer: William Spieth
- Programmer: Mark Palange
- Artists: Vadim Vahrameev; Kelly Kleider
- Composer: Daniel Indart
- Series: Tropico
- Platforms: Windows, Mac OS X
- Release: Windows: NA: April 8, 2003; EU: April 25, 2003; Mac OS X: NA: May 19, 2005; EU: September 19, 2005
- Genre: City-building game
- Mode: Single player

Tropico 2: Pirate Cove is a city-building game developed by Frog City Software and published by Gathering in April 2003. It is the sequel to Tropico.

Tropico 2 was a commercial success, with sales above 300,000 copies. The review aggregator Metacritic designated the game's critical reception as "generally favorable". Following the acquisition of the Tropico license by Kalypso Media in 2008, that company published four sequels to Tropico 2: Tropico 3, Tropico 4, Tropico 5, and Tropico 6. The first three sequels were developed by Haemimont Games, while Limbic Entertainment developed Tropico 6.

== Gameplay ==
Tropico 2 is a city-building game. Though much of it is based on the original Tropico, the gameplay is very different. The player runs a pirate island and, as the Pirate King, must keep the pirates happy while stealing as much booty as possible. Workers, called captives, are taken on raids, from shipwrecks off the player's island, or from nations with which an alliance has been established. The captives are responsible for production and construction on the island. They can take on most of the jobs available, including farmer, lumberjack, and blacksmith, and can even be promoted to a pirate. Skilled captives may perform more specialized jobs which unskilled captives cannot. Still, the main goal of the game, other than the objectives stated in a scenario, is to stay in power, much like the original Tropico.

To keep captives happy, certain needs will need to be fulfilled, such as food, rest, religion, fear, and order. Pirates, however, prefer anarchy and defense, along with grub, grog, wenches (beauty aids for female pirates), and betting from various entertainment buildings as well as resting and stashing at personal homes. Anarchy measures the level of disorder in an area and mostly comes from entertainment buildings. Captives are prevented from escaping through the fear mechanic, which is maintained by special structures. Escaped workers may report to other monarchs and cause uprisings. Pirate ships may be built at boatyards or shipyards, and are used to plunder other islands or board enemy ships to steal gold with which the player can build a greater pirate base and occasionally wealthy captives, who do not work but have a ransom that increases as they use entertainment buildings. There are also several challenging scenarios in which the goal is to survive in harsh environments, from angry pirates to escaping captives.

The game offers fewer choices for development compared to its predecessor. In Tropico, the economy could be focused on industry, tourism, military despotism, commodities, or a combination of all four. In Pirate Cove, the player is more limited in scope and path, and will end up building many of the same buildings every time with few additions, which means Pirate Cove does not have the emphasis on spreadsheets and statistics that its predecessor did.

Tropico 2 is the first game to have a campaign in the series, in which each scenario has a goal to be accomplished within the time limit. Goals can range from constructing certain structures, having enough money in the treasury or personal stash, ensuring overall pirate happiness is above a certain point, achieving harmonious relations with a faction, and having a certain number of ships on the island. The campaign follows a pirate king whose traits change as the campaign goes on.

== Development ==
=== Origins ===
After PopTop Software completed the original Tropico, its president Phil Steinmeyer was uninterested in developing further games in the series. However, the game's publisher, Take-Two Interactive, requested an expansion pack to capitalize on Tropico's success. Steinmeyer explained that he "really wanted to work with" Frog City Software on the project and approached the studio in 2001, but it was unavailable due to scheduling conflicts. During their talks, the possibility of Frog City's developing Tropico 2 arose instead, and PopTop requested a design pitch from the company in September.

According to Steinmeyer, the teams agreed that "there just wasn't enough material" to develop a second "Castro-style game", and so Frog City began to consider alternative settings. Eventually, the company's Mark Palange suggested a piracy theme, of which Frog City, Steinmeyer and Take-Two Interactive all approved. Frog City's president, Rachel Bernstein, considered the game's approach "a fresh angle" on piracy in games, compared to earlier projects like Sid Meier's Pirates! Tropico 2 entered development shortly thereafter.

=== Production ===
Although Frog City developed Tropico 2, PopTop remained involved as the game's producer. At the time, the former company's Bill Spieth explained that PopTop "looks at Pirate Cove milestones, approves Frog City's work, and gives feedback on game play, interface, or whatever." PopTop also created the game's cutscenes. Frog City chose to reuse PopTop's game engine from Tropico, which had also appeared in the earlier Railroad Tycoon II. However, the engine went through a "major rework, and was essentially broken" for the project's initial six months, Steinmeyer explained at the time. This made it impossible for the team to display Tropico 2 and receive public feedback, an aspect of game development that Steinmeyer considered important.

Frog City's initial goal was to produce a "playable build" by March 2002, in preparation for a May announcement and fall release. This schedule was interrupted in February 2002, when Computer Games Magazine, a publication for which Steinmeyer worked as a columnist, opted to do a cover story on Tropico 2. The game was ultimately announced on March 1, 2002. While the preview received positive feedback and energized the team, Frog City was inspired by fan comments to expand the game, especially with regard to pirate captains. This necessitated a delay past the holidays and a budget increase of "several hundred thousand", according to Steinmeyer. However, he was able to negotiate the new schedule and budget with the game's publisher.

Frog City attempted to capture the visual and humor style of the first Tropico, while changing the gameplay mechanics. It occurred to the team that pirates' pleasure-seeking behavior was similar to the behavior of tourists in Tropico, and so they chose to amplify the game's focus on entertainment compared to its predecessor. Spieth described Tropico 2 as a "reverse economy", since money and workers are stolen and expended on the player's pirates, instead of earned as in Tropico. In an effort to solve the first game's pathfinding issues, Frog City decided to restrict unit movement to roads. Despite these changes, much of the original game's interface was retained. In addition, Tropico's composer, Daniel Indart, was hired again to score Tropico 2.

To create Tropico 2's pirate setting, the team "went almost completely with myth and fiction", according to Spieth. Rafael Sabatini's adventure novels were a main reference point for the game, and Spieth compared the game's setting to the island of Tortuga portrayed in Captain Blood. The story of Tropico 2's protagonist was based on the plot of Captain Blood as well. To design the historical pirate leaders, such as Blackbeard and Laurens de Graaf, the team studied tales of their exploits and crafted the characters' strengths and weaknesses accordingly. For example, they were inspired by de Graaf's hatred of Spain to make him unable to work with that country in Tropico 2. The team strove to keep Tropico 2 lighthearted and comedic despite its piracy theme; for example, the pirate overseer unit was made to use a towel whip at Rachel Bernstein's suggestion.

In designing the sequel, Frog City sought to balance its differences from and similarities to its predecessor, which Spieth called "a tightrope [walk] between 'too different,' and 'not different enough.' " Steinmeyer remarked that this concern persisted until near the game's release: certain spectators called Tropico 2 too much unlike Tropico, while its "sales, marketing, [and] overseas offices" considered it to be too similar to sell. He believed that the latter problem was caused by the game's reuse of terrain visuals from Tropico, which led the team to create new tree models, and to edit the "colors and textures" of Tropico 2's reused water and earth graphics. To appease those who found Tropico 2 too different from its predecessor, Frog City increased the game's emphasis on city-building, which had previously been marginalized in favor of pirate raids.

Tropico 2 reached gold status on April 2, 2003. It was released in North America on April 8. A version for Mac OS X was developed by Westlake Interactive and published by MacSoft, releasing in North America in North America on May 19, 2005, and in Europe on September 19.

== Reception and legacy ==
Reception

Aggregate score
| Aggregator | Score |
|---|---|
| Metacritic | 75/100 |

Review scores
| Publication | Score |
|---|---|
| Computer Gaming World | 3 out of 5 |
| Eurogamer | 9 out of 10 |
| Game Informer | 8 out of 10 |
| IGN | 8.4 out of 10 |
| PC Gamer (US) | 62% |
| X-Play | 3 out of 5 |
| PC Format | 78% |
| Computer Games Magazine | 3 out of 5 |

In the United Kingdom, Tropico 2 sold poorly during the first half of 2003. Kristan Reed of GamesIndustry.biz wrote that it was "struggling to sell upwards of 5k", and speculated that software piracy could be the cause. According to former members of Frog City employed at Sidecar Studios, Tropico 2 sold over 300,000 copies worldwide and was commercially successful. The review aggregation website Metacritic designated Tropico 2's critical reception as "generally favorable".

Kristian Brogger of Game Informer summarized Tropico 2 as addictive and "a blast", and noted its "irrepressible charm". However, he called the game a small step down from Tropico, and found its pirate setting unoriginal and its gameplay repetitive. In Computer Gaming World, Di Luo considered Tropico 2 to be a missed opportunity, and found its new mechanics limited and "tedious" compared to the gameplay of its predecessor. Although he enjoyed its theme and audiovisual style, he found that Tropico 2 contains "nothing to set it apart from the crowd." However, Luo argued that the game never loses its "inexplicable charm", and that it "never really gets bad".

Writing for IGN, Barry Brenesal called Tropico 2 an improvement upon Tropico, thanks to its "more open-ended quality" and new setting. He praised its interface, particularly the logbook, and called the game a refreshing standout in the management simulation genre. While Brenesal considered certain aspects of Tropico 2 to be unintuitive, he highlighted its "strong economic engine, [and] well-balanced gameplay." IGN went on to name Tropico 2 "IGNPC's Game of the Month" for April 2003. Conversely, Jason Cross of Computer Games Magazine called Tropico 2's interface superior to that of Tropico, but he felt that the game featured "too much interface and busy work." He found it dated compared to current strategy games, and concluded, "Tropico 2 doesn't come through with enough swashbuckling, ship-boarding flair."

PC Format's Matt Avery summarized Tropico 2 as "short-lived fun with information overload in place of interaction." Although he remarked that "statisticians will have a field day" with the game's detailed economics, he disliked Tropico 2's lack of direct control over units, and found the overall product "rather limited." Writing for PC Gamer US, Stephen Poole criticized the game's combination of piracy and management gameplay, which he found awkward, unrealistic and unsatisfying. He also argued that the game's musical style is incongruous with its setting. Poole concluded that Tropico 2's theme is "barely a skin-deep covering on a sim that could just as easily have been made about the ACME Widget Factory."

Tropico 2 was the final entry in the series to be published by Take-Two Interactive. No further Tropico games were greenlighted until November 2008, when Kalypso Media bought the Tropico intellectual property from Take-Two and announced Tropico 3, developed by Bulgaria's Haemimont Games. The game was released in 2009. Afterward, Haemimont Games developed Tropico 4 (2011) and Tropico 5 (2014), both published by Kalypso. Tropico 6, developed by Limbic Entertainment and published again by Kalypso Media, was announced in June 2017. It was released for PC on March 29, 2019.
