= Rachel Bernstein =

Video Game producer

- Education: Princeton University
- Occupations: Video game developer, Video game designer
- Known for: Frog City Software; Imperialism; Tropico 2: Pirate Cove; Trade Empires

Rachel Bernstein is a video game designer and developer based in San Francisco, USA.

== Education ==
Bernstein graduated from Princeton University with a degree in electrical engineering and computer science in 1987.

== Career ==
From 1987 to 1994, Bernstein worked as a software engineer. In 1994, she co-founded the company Frog City Software with the brothers Bill and Ted Spieth. Bernstein wrote the code and assembled a development team for a prototype that later became the game Imperialism. The project received funding from Strategic Simulations in 1995, with president Chuck Kroegel describing it as "the thinking man's Civilization." Imperialism was released in 1997 and has an IGN community rating of 7.8/10. Bernstein oversaw the development of games Imperialism II: Age of Exploration and Trade Empires, for which she wrote a detailed project breakdown. In 2003, Bernstein sold Frog City to Take-Two Interactive, but continued to run the company as Take-Two's subsidiary.

Bernstein joined Electronic Arts in 2007 and became an executive producer for Maxis, overseeing the development of the Wii version of MySims Agents (2009) and The Sims Medieval (2011).

Since 2013, Bernstein has served as an executive producer at Google for the Android Play Studio.

She has been a speaker at South by Southwest, TEDxYouth, and the 2016 Astra S.T.E.A.M. Summit in San Francisco.
