= Tropico (series) =

Video game series

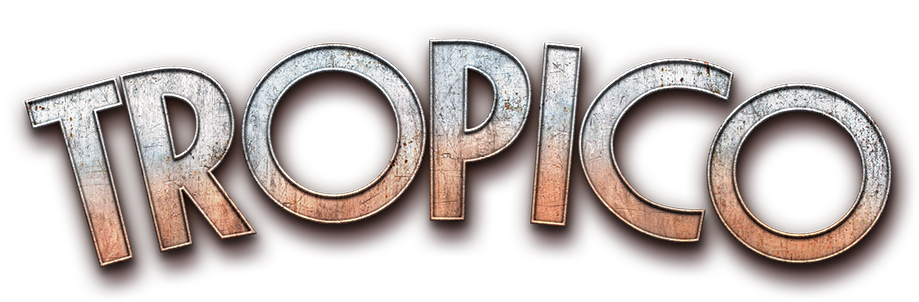
- Genres: City-building, construction and management simulation
- Developers: PopTop Software; BreakAway Games; Frog City Software; Haemimont Games; Limbic Entertainment; Realmforge Studios
- Publishers: Gathering of Developers; Feral Interactive; Kalypso Media
- Platforms: Windows; Mac OS X; Xbox 360; iOS; Android; Linux; PlayStation 4; Xbox One; Nintendo Switch; PlayStation 5; Xbox Series X/S
- First release: Tropico; April 21, 2001
- Latest release: Tropico 6 March 29, 2019

Tropico is a city-building construction and management simulation video game series created by PopTop Software. The franchise was introduced in 2001 with Tropico. With the exception of Tropico 2: Pirate Cove, the games task players to assume control of "El Presidente", a ruler who runs an island-based banana republic. They must construct infrastructure, draft policies, forge diplomatic relationships with other nations in the world, and keep their citizens content.

Haemimont Games led the development of three Tropico games from 2009 to 2014. Limbic Entertainment developed Tropico 6 (2019). Franchise owner Kalypso Media subsequently assigned one of its internal developers, Realmforge Studios, to develop all future content for the franchise.

== History ==
=== Gathering of Developers (2001–2003) ===
Tropico was developed by PopTop Software, the company behind Railroad Tycoon II. For the game's development, the team's size increased from six employees to ten, including seven artists and three programmers. The idea for the first Tropico is to create a city-building game and integrate political elements into it. Elaborating on the concept of the game, PopTop's Franz Felsl said that the player's "job is social engineering as much as it is urban planning and industry building". Publisher Gathering of Developers announced the game in April 2000. A Dreamcast version of the game was announced but ultimately cancelled by the developer. Tropico was a critical success. Its depiction of serious political issues through tongue-in-cheek humour was praised.

BreakAway Games developed the game's first expansion, Tropical Paradise, which was later bundled with the base game and released as Tropico: Mucho Macho Edition in June 2002. A sequel, Tropico 2: Pirate Cove, was released in 2003. Development of the game commenced in 2001. PopTop Software decided to focus on the development of Railroad Tycoon III, development of the game was instead handled by Frog City Software. The second game took a different direction from the first, instead tasking the player to oversee a pirate den during the 17th century.

=== Kalypso Media (2008–present) ===
The series stayed dormant for years until Kalypso Media acquired the intellectual property rights from Take-Two Interactive. Tropico 3 was announced in November 2008, with Bulgarian company Haemimont Games leading its development. It is the first 3D Tropico game, and the first to be released for video game consoles. The premise of the game is closer to that of the first game than Pirate Cove, featuring the return of "El Presidente". Tropico 3 was released in October 2009. Haemimont returned for the development of Tropico 4, which introduced new gameplay features such as a narrative campaign and natural disasters. While Tropico 4 received generally positive reviews, it was frequently criticized for being too similar to its predecessor. Its use of legacy code also resulted in glitches and software bugs. As a result, the team decided to not reuse any codes from previous games, and started from scratch, creating assets from the ground up for Tropico 5. The game also introduces a new era-based progression system. It was a commercial success for Kalypso, reaching sales of "over six figures" during its launch period. Kalypso also released Tropico Dictator Pack, which bundled the first four games together, in September 2014.

German developer Limbic Entertainment led the development of the sixth game in the series. For the first time in the series, Tropico 6 was powered by Unreal Engine. Instead of settling only one island, the game tasks players to manage an archipelago. The game was released in 2019. In December 2020, Kalypso Media announced that it had fully acquired Realmforge Studios, most known for being the creators of the Dungeons series. It also announced that Realmforge Studios will be the developer of all future content for the franchise, starting with the "Caribbean Skies" DLC for Tropico 6. Nine Worlds Studios, based in Munich, was also set up in 2021 by Kalypso Media to work on future Tropico games.

In 2019, Feral Interactive released a mobile port of Tropico 3, retitled to simply Tropico, for iOS and Android.

== Games ==
Year	Title	Developers	Platform(s)
2001	Tropico	PopTop Software	Windows, Mac OS X
2003	Tropico 2: Pirate Cove	Frog City Software	Windows, Mac OS X
2009	Tropico 3	Haemimont Games	Windows, Mac OS X, Xbox 360
2011	Tropico 4	Haemimont Games	Windows, Mac OS X, Xbox 360
2014	Tropico 5	Haemimont Games	Linux, Mac OS X, Windows, PlayStation 4, Xbox 360, Xbox One
2019	Tropico 6	Limbic Entertainment	Windows, Mac OS X, Linux, PlayStation 4, Xbox One, Nintendo Switch, PlayStation 5, Xbox Series X/S
2019	Tropico (Tropico 3 port)	Feral Interactive	iOS, Android
2027	Tropico 7	Gaming Minds Studios	Windows, PlayStation 5, Xbox Series X/S
