= Imperialism (disambiguation) =

Imperialism is a policy or ideology of extending the authority of a country over other countries and people.

Imperialism may also refer to:

- Imperialism, the Highest Stage of Capitalism, a 1917 book by Lenin
- Imperialism (Hobson book), a 1902 book by John A. Hobson
- Imperialism (speech), a 1900 speech by William Jennings Bryan
- Imperialism (video game), a 1997 turn-based strategy game
- Theories of imperialism, theories, some non-Marxist, but many Marxist, concerning the transfer of profit between countries
