= Trópico =

Trópico (Spanish and Portuguese for ‘tropic’) or Tropico may refer to:

== Computing ==
- Tropico (series), a simulation, city-building video game franchise
  - Tropico (video game), the first game in the series
- Tropicos, an online botanical database

== Film and television ==
- Tropico (2013 film), an American short film written by and starring Lana Del Rey
- Tropico (upcoming film), an American film noir thriller
- Trópico (TV series), a 2007 Venezuelan-Dominican telenovela

== Music ==
- Davide Petrella, Italian singer-songwriter also known as Tropico
- Tropico (Pat Benatar album), 1984
- Trópico (Ricardo Arjona album), 2009
- Tropico, an album by Gato Barbieri, 1978
- Tropico, an album by Tony Esposito, 1996

== Places ==
- Trópico (Bolivia), a subdivision of Cochabamba, Bolivia
- Tropico, California, place name in California near Glendale
