= Impressionism (disambiguation) =

Impressionism is an art movement.

Impressionism or Impressionist may also refer to:

- Impressionism (literature)
- Impressionism in music
- Impressionist (entertainment), a performer who imitates famous people
- The Impressionists (TV series), a 2006 BBC drama series
- The Impressionists: Painting and Revolution, a 2011 BBC documentary series presented by Waldemar Januszczak
- Impressionists (video game), 1997
- Impressionism (play), a 2009 play by Michael Jacobs
