= Park Beyond =

- Developer: Limbic Entertainment
- Publisher: Bandai Namco Entertainment
- Director: Johannes Reithmann
- Composer: Olivier Deriviere
- Engine: Unreal Engine 4
- Platforms: Microsoft Windows; PlayStation 5; Xbox Series X/S
- Release: 16 June 2023
- Genre: Construction and management simulation
- Mode: Single-player

Park Beyond is a construction and management simulation video game developed by Limbic Entertainment and published by Bandai Namco Entertainment. The game was released for Windows PC, PlayStation 5 and Xbox Series X and Series S in June 2023.

== Gameplay ==
Park Beyond is a construction and management simulation video game in which the player can build their own theme parks. In the game, the player needs to build, design and manage various flat rides and roller coasters as the park's main attractions, as well as other relevant facilities such as shops and restaurants. These facilities can be extensively customized. Park Beyond introduces the idea of "impossification", which allows players to construct rides that defy physics and gravity. These rides generate a resource named Amazement. With sufficient Amazement, players will be able to research new ways to "impossify" their attractions. Players, as park managers, also need to keep an eye on social trends to ensure that their attractions will draw players to the park.

Players will meet different advisors in the game, who will present the player different conflicts. For instance, an imaginative attraction proposed by an advisor may be scrutinized by another because it may not be feasible financially. Players have to face these dilemmas and make decisions regularly. The player will also participate in pitch meetings in which they will explain to the park's board of directors their plans for the park.

== Development ==
Park Beyond was developed by German developer Limbic Entertainment. After working on Tropico 6 (2019) for four years, the team wanted to create something new, and two theme park enthusiasts pitched to management the idea of making a theme park simulator. According to Limbic's CEO Stephan Winter, the pitch was welcomed by the team because it was "fresh enough to excite everyone", and that they were able to "transfer a lot of know-how" from working on a city-building game to a theme park simulation game. While the team introduced the idea of "impossification", they still wanted the game to be "grounded in reality" and "believable".

The game was announced by Limbic Entertainment and publisher Bandai Namco Entertainment at Gamescom 2021. Bandai Namco became majority stakeholder of Limbic Entertainment in October 2022. Initially set to be released in 2022, the game was delayed and released on 16 June 2023 for Windows PC, PlayStation 5 and Xbox Series X and Series S. A closed beta for the game was held from 9 to 19 May. Players who pre-ordered the standard edition of the game received the "Pac-Man Impossification Set". In addition, players who purchase the "Visioneer Edition" will gain access to the "Zombeyond Impossification Set". These packs were made available as separate DLC packs at a later date.

The first major DLC pack, Beyond eXtreme, was initially scheduled for release on 29 September alongside an update that allows players to share their creations online. On 18 September, it was moved to a later date. A DLC pack themed to Chicken Run: Dawn of the Nugget was released alongside the movie on 15 December.

== Reception ==
According to review aggregator website Metacritic, the PC and PlayStation 5 versions of the game received "mixed or average" reviews, while the Xbox Series X version received "generally positive reviews". It was the 38th best-selling video game in the UK in its week of release.
