= Corsair Cove =

2026 city-building strategy video game

- Cover art
- Developer: Limbic Entertainment
- Publisher: Hooded Horse
- Engine: Unreal Engine 5
- Platform: Microsoft Windows
- Release: July 31, 2026
- Genres: City-building game, strategy
- Mode: Single-player

Corsair Cove is a 2026 city-building and strategy video game developed by Limbic Entertainment and published by Hooded Horse. Set during the late Golden Age of Piracy, the game places players in command of a pirate settlement built across steep cliffs and rocky islands, combining traditional city-building mechanics with naval expeditions, exploration, and combat. The game was released for Microsoft Windows on 31 July 2026.

== Gameplay ==
Corsair Cove is a single-player city-building game that combines settlement management, production chains, logistics optimisation, and naval exploration. Players establish a pirate colony by constructing housing, industrial buildings, farms, docks, and defensive structures while managing the needs of an expanding population.

The game places a strong emphasis on vertical city design. Settlements are constructed across cliffs, rock formations, and islands rather than on a largely flat landscape. Buildings can be positioned at multiple elevations and connected through transportation infrastructure including bridges, ladders, elevators, stairways, and ziplines.

Outside the player's settlement, fleets can be dispatched to explore the surrounding seas, discover hidden locations, recover treasure, establish trade opportunities, and engage hostile forces. These activities are modeled using a turn-based card game.

== Development ==
Corsair Cove was developed by German studio Limbic Entertainment, known for strategy titles including Tropico 6. The game was published by Hooded Horse, a publisher specializing in strategy and simulation games.

The game was announced at Webedia Germany's (publisher of GameStar) FYNG showcase event and built using Unreal Engine 5. A playable demo was released ahead of launch, allowing players to experience the game's settlement-building mechanics and logistics systems before release.

== Reception ==
Reception

Aggregate scores
Aggregator	Score
Metacritic	79/100
OpenCritic	83% recommend (Note: Based on 12 reviews)

Review scores
Publication	Score
Destructoid	8.5/10
PC Gamer (UK)	82/100
PC Games (DE)	8/10

The title launched to generally favorable reviews according to the review aggregation website Metacritic. Fellow review aggregator OpenCritic assessed that the game received strong approval, being recommended by 83% of critics.

Most critics praised the vertical building system and the game's visuals, while the card-based combat system was described as repetitive and lacking depth.
