= The Sims Medieval =

2011 video game

- Developers: Maxis Redwood Shores; Magic Pockets (iOS)
- Publisher: Electronic Arts
- Writer: Sean Baity
- Composer: John Debney
- Series: The Sims
- Platforms: Microsoft Windows, Mac OS X, iOS, Windows Phone, Mobile
- Release: NA: March 22, 2011; AU: March 24, 2011; EU: March 25, 2011; iOS; September 22, 2011; Java; October 2011; Windows Phone; March 26, 2013; Pirates & Nobles: NA: August 30, 2011; EU: September 2, 2011; AU: 2011
- Genres: Action-adventure, social simulation
- Mode: Single-player

The Sims Medieval is a life simulation game that was released in March 2011 by Electronic Arts for Microsoft Windows and Mac OS X as part of The Sims series. Mobile versions were released on September 22, 2011 for iOS, Java (J2ME), and also for Windows Phone on March 26, 2013. It is not available on Mac OS Catalina or above. Set in medieval times, it allows the player to build a kingdom through quest-driven gameplay. During presentation at E3 2010, a pre-order exclusive Limited Edition was also available.

== Gameplay ==
=== Main gameplay and objectives ===
The Sims Medieval is a life-simulation game with action-adventure elements, having a more role-playing video game tone than past Sims games. The storyline of the game is to build a successful kingdom by fulfilling the player's "Kingdom Ambition", which the player chooses at the start of the game. Once an ambition has been completed, the player will unlock new ambitions for future playthroughs as well as unlocking freeplay for that specific kingdom. The major difference in gameplay from previous installations is a quest-driven system. With the game stopped, the player has to choose a quest (quests are required to fulfill said kingdom ambition), and then choose which hero Sim they want to use. A player can create Hero Sims to control, each one having a profession (monarch, knight, merchant, and the like). The character creation, simulation, and architectural aspects are significantly reduced and altered to enforce a sharper focus on role-playing-style gameplay. For example, players are able to customize the aesthetics and layout of building interiors, but unable to alter the basic structure and shape of buildings.

With the quest and the Hero Sim(s) selected, the game un-pauses and the player is able to control the chosen Hero Sim(s) during the quest. When the quest is completed, another quest must be selected and another choice of Hero Sim(s) must be made. During quests other non-controlled Sims (even the Heroes created by the player) live in the kingdom, and will continue their life while the quest is going on, like in the story progression feature in The Sims 3. In an interview with GameSpot, senior producer Rachel Bernstein stated that the game will be more dangerous for Sims, with death and failure a possibility during the game's quests. Listed dangers included low focus on quests, plague, peasant revolts, wildlife, poisons, duels, and more. Players earn ratings at the end of the game depending on their performance. Players may also reach "Quest Failed" screens if they do not complete a predefined goal in a predetermined amount of time.

=== Quests ===
A player's main goal is to complete the quest by following the indicated quest-related actions; however, it is also important to excel at the quest so better rewards are given. How the Hero Sim is doing in the quest can be seen in the quest performance meter. Besides the quest and quest performance, players' Sims have various jobs, and each job has its own duties (called responsibilities) that they will be given to fulfill daily (two per day). Doing so will raise their focus, their in-game mood, which has a major involvement in the way the Sim performs many interactions, as well as in the quest performance itself.

== Development and release ==
Gameplay-wise, The Sims Medieval was similar to The Sims Stories games, such as The Sims Pet Stories and The Sims Castaway Stories, both of which had The Sims 2 engine. Instead, The Sims Medieval was using The Sims 3 engine. Producer Rachel Bernstein stated that subsurface scattering had been added to character models to give the characters a "painterly look". Other upgrades included "next-gen sims tech", and a new engine for light within the game. Another difference is the terrain used in the game. Whereas the terrain or neighborhoods in The Sims 3 or other Sim games was generally flat for the purpose of building, The Sims Medieval's terrain or kingdom is varied in altitudes and layouts resulting in a realistic display of geography. The terrain in the game also has a "painterly look" as do the Sims of the game thanks to the enhanced engine. Bernstein conducted multiple media interviews and narrated demos, and a television marketing campaign was launched. Some advertisements featured actor Donald Faison. Patrick Stewart narrated both the "epic trailer" and the intro cinematic.

The mobile version for The Sims Medieval was released in a 3D version for iOS (also ported to Windows Phone) and in a 2D isometric version for Java based devices.

== Reception ==
The Sims Medieval

Aggregate score
Aggregator	Score		
Aggregator	iOS	Macintosh	PC
Metacritic	79/100	N/A	77/100

Review scores
Publication	Score		
Publication	iOS	Macintosh	PC
Edge	N/A	N/A	7/10
Eurogamer	N/A	N/A	7/10
Game Informer	N/A	N/A	7/10
Gamekult	N/A	N/A	7/10
GamePro	N/A	N/A	4/5
GameRevolution	N/A	N/A	A−
GamesMaster	78%	N/A	78%
GameSpot	N/A	N/A	6/10
IGN	N/A	N/A	8.5/10
Jeuxvideo.com	12/20	13/20	13/20
MacLife	N/A	4.5/5	N/A
PC Gamer (UK)	N/A	N/A	70%
Pocket Gamer	3.5/5	N/A	N/A
TouchArcade	3.5/5	N/A	N/A
The Escapist	N/A	N/A	4/5
Metro	N/A	N/A	7/10

The PC and iOS versions received "generally favorable reviews" according to the review aggregation website Metacritic. Nicole Tanner of IGN said of the PC version, "The Sims Medieval has successfully breathed new life into a franchise that was getting pretty stale. ... Even with its minor flaws, The Sims Medieval mixes a great sense of humor with simple role-playing game mechanics that result in hours of fun."

Felix Atkin of The Observer praised the game, deeming it as "enchanting stuff set in a beautifully animated and immersive fairy-tale world. And with a clearer structure for achieving quests and character development, it will appeal to RPG fans as never before." Video game magazine Edge wrote, "It's a funny and sweet time sink, and something that any Sims fan can wholeheartedly enjoy." AJ Glasser of GamePro said, "As let down as I am, though, I'm not ready to get out my pitchfork. Some things in this game kept me coming back for 20 hours. ... The Sims Medieval is a beautiful game with fun and interesting ideas, but it doesn't live up to my fantasy of the Middle Ages and it doesn't completely satisfy the Sims fan in me."

Greg Tito of The Escapist gave the PC version a score of four stars out of five, saying, "Maxis wagered that adding fun new game elements to its blockbuster franchise would work, and The Sims Medieval succeeds sufficiently to start its own branching franchise. Expect an expansion pack or ten." Roger Hargreaves of Metro gave it seven out of ten, calling it a "surprisingly daring mix of interactive narrative, role-playing game and life simulator – and nothing like the lazy cash-in you'd expect". Samantha Nelson of The A.V. Club gave it a B−, saying, "While some Sims fans might find the addition of quests and a leveling system makes [sic] the game even more addictive, The Sims Medieval does away with some of the series' classic components, like designing buildings and watching your Sims age."

== Expansion pack ==
An expansion pack (branded as "adventure pack") titled The Sims Medieval: Pirates & Nobles was released in North America on August 30, 2011. Pirates and Nobles is also included in a deluxe edition of The Sims Medieval. The pack features a new kingdom ambition, new traits and legendary traits, new clothes, over 140 new objects (including an interrogation chair), new quests, and new social interactions. There is also a new treasure-hunting mechanic with maps, shovels, treasures, and dangers. Additionally, the pack introduces pets, new NPC pirates, and a new creature, baby pit beast, which is a new type of Sim death.

=== Reception ===
The Sims Medieval: Pirates & Nobles

Aggregate score
Aggregator	Score
Metacritic	67/100

Review scores
Publication	Score
Gamekult	4/10
IGN	5.5/10
Jeuxvideo.com	13/20

Pirates & Nobles received "average" reviews according to Metacritic.
