= Grand Ages: Rome =

2009 video game

- Developer: Haemimont Games
- Publisher: Kalypso Media
- Platforms: Microsoft Windows; Cloud (OnLive)
- Release: EU: March 6, 2009; NA: March 17, 2009; AU: March 19, 2009
- Genres: City-building, real-time strategy
- Modes: Single-player, multiplayer

Grand Ages: Rome (previously known as Imperium Romanum 2) is a 2009 city-building and real-time strategy game developed by Haemimont Games and published by Kalypso Media. It is the sequel to 2008's Imperium Romanum. The Italian and Spanish versions of the game are titled as Imperivm: Civitas III. A sequel, Grand Ages: Medieval, was released on September 25, 2015.

== Plot ==
The single player campaign takes place during the final years of the Roman Republic during the time of the First Triumvirate. The player undertakes missions for his/her family, establishing a reputation as a statesman and leader, as well as working under historical figures like Marcus Tullius Cicero, Mark Antony, Pompey Magnus, and Marcus Licinius Crassus. Certain historical events are portrayed, such as slave uprising led by Spartacus and the crossing of the Rubicon. At one point the player must choose between siding with Julius Caesar or Pompey Magnus, with missions playing out to wiping out the Optimates or building armies against the Populares.

== Gameplay ==
Starting out, players create a character, choosing their name, gender and portrait. They then choose which family to associate their character with, selecting between the Flavii, Valerii, Julii, Aemilii, or Lucii, each with unique traits that benefit the player in military, civic or economic ways.

The focus of the game is on macromanagement. Each mission involves building a Roman colony in various locations around the Roman Republic, with certain requirements and bonus objectives to successfully complete the mission. A colony includes various food production buildings, such as wheat and pig farms, bakeries and butchers; material production buildings such as lumber camps and brick works; religious temples; and various types of housing for different citizen classes (Plebs, Patricians, and Equites). Emphasis is placed on efficiency and employment, ensuring that all buildings are staffed by the appropriate worker class.

Resources are based on a "flow" economy, in which the player does not actually accumulate a stockpile of resources, but rather develops the infrastructure to construct and maintain buildings. To gain more resources, players may opt to build communities around the map, engage in trade, or purchase estates, which remain with the character for the duration of the campaign.

Players must keep the citizens content through satisfactory levels of food, religion, and entertainment. Building benefits work on a radius system, with buildings providing their bonuses or needing other materials within a certain distance. The player may construct significant monuments for large or global bonuses, such as the Colosseum, Circus Maximus, and Pantheon. When players fail to satisfy the needs of their citizens, crime and disease may spread and homes may be deserted, which may lead to a chain reaction in the shortage of goods and services.

Missions will often focus on military skirmishes, allowing the player to recruit, train and command groups of units such as hastati, triarii, and auxilia. Battles usually occur on a small scale with a basic experience and morale system. Often, campaign maps will feature barbarian villages or war camps, which can be subjugated for additional resources or razed for money and slaves.

== Expansion ==
An expansion pack titled Grand Ages: Rome - The Reign of Augustus (known as Imperivm Online in Spain and Italy) was released on November 26, 2009 in Spain, December 1 in Italy and in January 2010 worldwide. It is sold worldwide online and sold in retail stores only in Italy and Spain.

The Reign of Augustus is a mix of previous releases with a city builder mode (as in Imperivm Civitas games) and a conquest mode (as in Imperivm RTC games, like Imperivm III: Great Battles of Rome). It is focused on politics, conquests and government in the time of Augustus.

== Development ==
The game was developed by Haemimont Games.

== Reception ==
Reception

Aggregate score
Aggregator	Score
Metacritic	72/100

Review scores
Publication	Score
GameSpot	5.5/10
GameZone	6.7/10
IGN	6.8/10
PC Format	69%
PC Gamer (UK)	68%
PC Zone	68%

Grand Ages: Rome received "average" reviews according to the review aggregation website Metacritic. IGN said that there was little difference from traditional city builders and limited combat control. GameSpot said the game was another generic city-builder set in ancient Rome.
