= Victor Vran =

2015 video game

- Developer: Haemimont Games
- Publisher: EuroVideo Medien (Note: Switch version published by Wired Productions.)
- Director: Gabriel Dobrev
- Designers: Boyan Ivanov; Boian Spasov
- Programmer: Ivaylo Todorov
- Artist: Nelson Inomvan
- Composer: George Strezov
- Platforms: Microsoft Windows; OS X Linux; PlayStation 4 Xbox One; Nintendo Switch; Amazon Luna
- Release: Windows, OS X, Linux; 24 July 2015; PlayStation 4, Xbox One; 6 June 2017; Nintendo Switch; 28 August 2018; Amazon Luna; 20 October 2020
- Genre: Action role-playing
- Modes: Single-player, multiplayer

Victor Vran is an action role-playing video game by Bulgarian indie developer Haemimont Games. It was published on Steam by EuroVideo Medien. The setting of the game resembles Gothic-fantasy fairy tale where both magic and science have a place in the world. The title was released on July 24, 2015. An updated port titled Victor Vran: Overkill Edition was released on PlayStation 4 and Xbox One on 6 June 2017, and a Nintendo Switch port was released on August 28, 2018. A version of the original game was made available for Amazon Luna on 20 October 2020.

== Setting ==
The player assumes the role of Victor Vran, a demon hunter who arrives in the fantasy city of Zagoravia, to help its inhabitants fight off a demon infestation of unknown origin.

== Gameplay ==
The combat of Victor Vran combines action RPG elements and reaction-based moves which allow the player to dodge attacks and avoid damage. The game features jump mechanic which is used in combat and in solving vertical puzzles and reaching secret map areas.

The hero, Victor Vran has no specific character class. Players can tweak their character by changing freely different weapon classes, consumable items (e.g. potions or bombs) and spell-like demon powers. Destiny cards and hero outfits grant various passive abilities. Each weapon class offers one basic and two special attacks which can be combined for special bonuses and effects.

The game world is divided in large areas representing the districts and the surroundings of the city of Zagoravia and adjacent dungeons. Each area has 5 specific challenges which grant various rewards upon completion. The player can tweak the difficulty on every area and dungeon by using special Hex items which grant buffs and bonuses to the enemies within.

Victor Vran features cooperative multiplayer.

== Additional content ==
The first DLC pack entitled Motörhead Through the Ages was released on 6 June 2017, along with another DLC pack entitled Fractured Worlds.

== Reception ==
Reception

Aggregate score
Aggregator	Score
Metacritic	(PC) 75/100 (XONE) 77/100; Overkill Edition (PS4) 76/100 (XONE) 79/100 (NS) 82/100

Review scores
Publication	Score
Nintendo Life	8/10
Nintendo World Report	9/10
PC Gamer (US)	82/100
Push Square	8/10

Victor Vran received generally positive reviews from critics upon release. Aggregate review website Metacritic assigned a score of 75/100 based on 42 reviews for Windows, and 77/100 for Xbox One based on 4 critic reviews.
