= Omerta – City of Gangsters =

2013 turn-based simulation video game

- Developer: Haemimont Games
- Publisher: Kalypso Media
- Platforms: Microsoft Windows; Mac OS X Xbox 360
- Release: Windows, Xbox 360: GER: 31 January 2013; EU: 1 February 2013; AU: 7 February 2013 (PC); NA: 12 February 2013; AU: 13 February 2013 (X360); Mac OS X 2 August 2013
- Genre: Simulation game
- Modes: Single-player, Multiplayer

Omerta – City of Gangsters is a simulation game with turn-based tactical game-play elements developed by Haemimont Games and published by Kalypso Media for Microsoft Windows, Mac OS X and the Xbox 360. The game was released in German-speaking countries on 31 January 2013. The international German download version for Windows was released through the Steam-service as well. The English version was released just a day after in the rest of Europe, and in Australia on 7 February for the PC version, whereas the version for the US market was released on 12 February, followed by the release of the Xbox 360 version in Australia the day after. A version for Mac OS X was published on 2 August 2013.

== Plot ==
As displayed on the cover, the game takes place during the 1920s – the Roaring Twenties – at the time of Prohibition. The game's story takes place in Atlantic City, where, due to a national ban on alcohol that turned it into a highly profitable and illegal product, Mafia organizations were able to become powerful, rich, and influential off the back of the illegal stills that produced bootleg alcohol and the speakeasys that served it to a wide and diverse range of customers.

In a time when criminal gangs practically ran Atlantic City and a handful of morally questionable men were able to prosper beyond their wildest dreams through gambling dens, quality spirits, and shady machinations, the player takes control of one such man as he strives to build an empire of his own in this melting pot of illegality. "Boss" D'Angelo is an Italian immigrant who was born in a small village in Sicily and has just arrived in Atlantic City. Working his way up from nothing, he must establish himself in the criminal underworld of the Mafia by buying and setting up illegal businesses, attacking rivals, and making friends, all the while simultaneously fulfilling his quest to attain the quintessential American Dream.

=== Trivia ===
Omerta, the game's title, refers to the infamous honor code known as "omertà", a code of silence which binds members of the Mafia or similar criminal organizations to professional discretion against any third parties.

Upon the official retail-release of the boxed- and digital distributed version, the game was also simultaneously released on GOG.com without any copy-protection, nor other digital rights management restrictions.

== Gameplay ==
Starting out as a low-level bootlegger, the player gradually builds up his criminal career, eventually advancing highly enough to establish his own businesses. The player can purchase untenanted shops, buildings, and structures to establish bars for serving alcohol, and breweries or distilleries for producing it. The player can also buy out opposing speakeasies from their owners to increase profits. A more legal way for generating income is buying apartments and then collecting rents from the tenants who lease them. Warehouses can be acquired to increase storage capacity for bootleg alcohol or to open up additional means for alcohol production.

As the game progresses, the character can recruit companions, form a gang to protect his business interests, and conquer the territories of rival gangsters. Characters provide specific role-playing elements based on their individual characteristics and equipment. In turn-based confrontations, the player expands his influence by using his henchmen to drive other bosses out of business through violence and intimidation, until he can ultimately reign supreme as the unchallenged godfather of Atlantic City organized crime.

In addition to co-operative and competitive multiplayer game-play, the game offers a sandbox mode to freely explore the game world, consisting of six district maps covering a recreation of 1920s Atlantic City.

=== Historical background ===
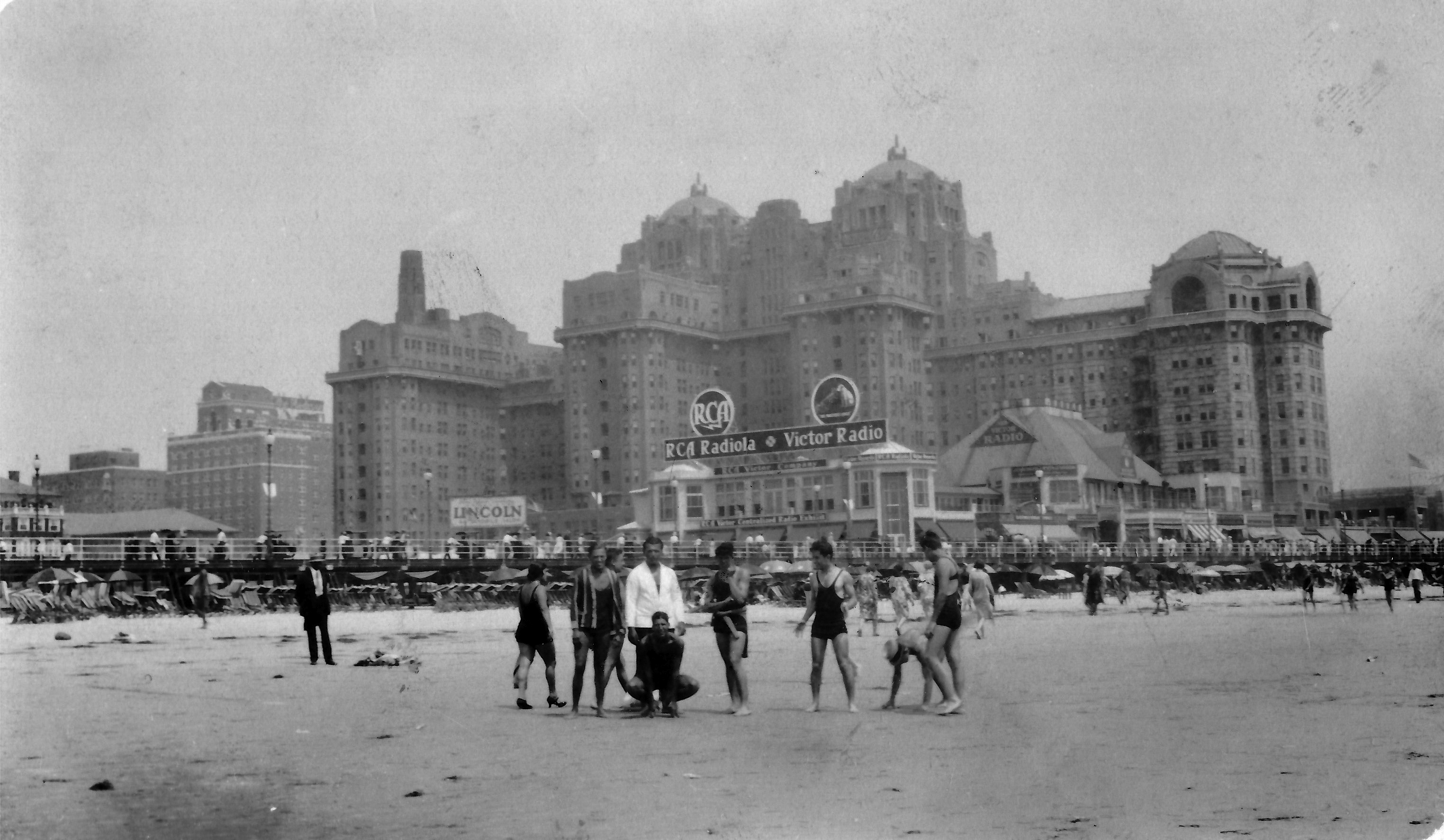
The renowned Traymore Hotel in Atlantic City, c. 1930

The game provides an explorable three-dimensional world which is displayed through a Top-down perspective. The in-game world represents, according to the publisher Kalypso Media, an almost accurate and historical correct reproduction of Atlantic City during Prohibition times.

Real buildings and places are present like the Traymore Hotel, the Absecon Lighthouse, the Atlantic City Jailhouse, or the board-walk "Eastern Promenade" as well as streets like "Illinois Avenue" or "North Carolina Avenue", which ends at the beach. Beside those real buildings, the remaining ones – which are shown in the Art Deco style consistent with the period – are very similar to each other and seem to only consist of a few design types.

== Licensing of name ==
Kalypso Media licensed the name Omerta from the MMORPG browser-based game of the same name, Omerta.

== Reception ==
Reception

Aggregate score
| Aggregator | Score | |
| Aggregator | PC | Xbox 360 |
|---|---|---|
| Metacritic | 54/100 | 43/100 |

Review scores
| Publication | Score | |
| Publication | PC | Xbox 360 |
|---|---|---|
| Destructoid | 5/10 | N/A |
| Eurogamer | N/A | 3/10 |
| Game Informer | 6/10 | N/A |
| GameSpot | 4/10 | N/A |
| GameSpy | 2/5 | N/A |
| GameZone | 7.5/10 | N/A |
| IGN | 5.2/10 | N/A |
| Jeuxvideo.com | 13/20 | 13/20 |
| Official Xbox Magazine (US) | N/A | 4/10 |
| PC Gamer (UK) | 78% | N/A |
| VentureBeat | 75/100 | N/A |
| The Escapist | 2.5/5 | N/A |
| Metro | 3/10 | N/A |

The PC version received "mixed" reviews, while the Xbox 360 version received "generally unfavourable reviews", according to the review aggregation website Metacritic.

PC Gamer praised the former version's mechanics as well as the AI while comparing its combat style elements to X-COM or Jagged Alliance. The story is described as too superficial, simple, and depth-less. The atmospheric music, on the other hand, was lauded as a brilliant melange of the jazz, ragtime and klezmer music of the period.

"Not as tough or as deep as it could be, Omerta is still a destination well worth a visit."

— Tim Stone, PC Gamer

Metro, however, criticised the same PC version. Initially intrigued by the promise of a new kind of "made-men" game, the turn-based combat system was ultimately deemed ungainly.

"You can see the basis of a good game here but Omerta gets almost everything wrong, from the shallow game-play to the bland, characterless gangster atmosphere."

— Roger Hargreaves, Metro

The Digital Fix gave it a score of five out of ten, saying that the game was "Best avoided by anyone seeking a real challenge or keen to get their teeth into some serious multiplayer gaming!" The Escapist also gave it two-and-a-half stars out of five, calling it "a deeply flawed blend of real time strategy and tactical turn-based battles that doesn't live up to the expectations of its premise."
