= Tropico 7 =

Upcoming video game by Kalypso Media

- Developer: Gaming Minds Studios
- Publisher: Kalypso Media
- Series: Tropico
- Platforms: Windows; PlayStation 5; Xbox Series X/S; Nintendo Switch 2
- Release: 28 January 2027
- Genres: Construction and management simulation, government simulation
- Modes: Single-player, multiplayer

Tropico 7 is an upcoming construction, management and government simulation video game developed by Gaming Minds Studios and published by Kalypso Media. It is set to be the seventh installment in the Tropico series. The game is scheduled to be released on PlayStation 5, Windows, Nintendo Switch 2 and Xbox Series X/S on 28 January 2027.

== Gameplay ==
As with trend of the series, Tropico 7 allows players to assume the role of "El Presidente". The game will feature five campaign maps, ten extra scenarios, more than twenty sandbox maps and a random map generator.

== Development and release ==
Tropico 7 was announced at Gamescom in May 2025. It is set to be the seventh entry in the Tropico series. Kalypso Media's in-house studio Gaming Minds Studios, known for titles such as Port Royale 3: Pirates & Merchants, to serve as the new video game developer, as Limbic Entertainment, the developer of the game's predecessor Tropico 6, was acquired by Bandai Namco Entertainment in 2022. A closed beta test arrived on 31 March 2026. The game is due to be launched on PlayStation 5, Windows, Nintendo Switch 2 and Xbox Series X/S on 28 January 2027. Xbox Game Pass would be also available on the launching day.
