= Glory of the Roman Empire =

2006 video game

Glory of the Roman Empire Imperivm Civitas
- Developer: Haemimont Games
- Publishers: CDV Software Entertainment; Enlight Interactive
- Composer: Sean Kolton
- Platform: Windows
- Release: EU: June 16, 2006; NA: June 28, 2006
- Genre: City-building
- Mode: Single-player

Glory of the Roman Empire is a 2006 city-building video game set during the age of the Roman Empire, developed by Haemimont Games. The game features a three-dimensional game engine and individual modeling of game character behaviors. The game was released in Spain and Italy in December 2006 by FX Interactive under the name Imperium Civitas. The difference in naming is explained by the popularity of Haemimont's previous games, Imperium I, II and III, which sold more than 1 million copies in these countries.

In the game, the player assumes the roles of city planner, governor, and military leader. Successful players will need planning skills, economic savvy, and—should those fail—military might. The glory of the Roman Empire will challenge gamers to grow a small village into a thriving community through trade with neighbors, while also expanding and defending its borders through more militaristic means. Players will need to focus on the physical and emotional health of the citizenry; as villagers age and mature under strong leadership, they contribute to the development of more advanced societies and larger cities.

A sequel entitled Imperium Romanum was released in 2008.

== Scenarios ==
Glory of the Roman Empire:

Missions take place in Florentia (5 missions), Pompeii (1 mission), Syracusae (4 missions), Toletum (3 missions), Kartagena (3 missions), Massilia (2 missions), Mediolanum (2 missions), Lugdunum (2 missions), Londinium (3 missions), and Colonia Claudia (3 missions).

There are seven more scenarios that are sandboxes: Mountain Paradise, Desert, Highlander, Across the river, Mamertum, Halkedonia, and Rome.

It also has a challenge mode where the player has to achieve random goals for 4 different cities.

Imperium Civitas: (Spanish and Italian edition)

There are two campaigns instead of one as in Glory of the Roman Empire: a military and peaceful campaign.

There are 12 freebuild cities: Burdigala, Colonia Agrippina, Syena, Andautonia, Roma, Geneva, Venetia, Tamiatis, Labacum, Antium, Salamantica, and Emerita Augusta.

In the challenge mode the player can choose from Londinium, Lutetia, Colonia Agrippina, Burdigala, Lugdunum, Mediolanum, Andautonia, Tarraco, Carthago Nova, Tingis, Caralis, Carthago, Syracusae, Pompeii, and Roma.

== Reception ==
Reception

Aggregate score
Aggregator	Score
Metacritic	66/100

Review scores
Publication	Score
1Up.com	C+
Eurogamer	6/10
GameSpot	5.6/10
GameSpy	3/5
GameZone	7/10
IGN	7.6/10
PALGN	6/10
PC Gamer (UK)	70%
PC Gamer (US)	50%
X-Play	3/5
The Sydney Morning Herald	2.5/5

The game received "average" reviews according to the review aggregation website Metacritic.

== See also ==
- Haemimont Games
- City-building game
