= Tzar: The Burden of the Crown =

2000 video game

- Developer: Haemimont Games
- Publisher: TalonSoft
- Designer: Vesselin Handjiev
- Platform: Windows
- Release: EU: January 27, 2000; NA: March 22, 2000
- Genre: Real-time strategy
- Mode: Single-player multiplayer

Tzar: The Burden of the Crown (Цар: Тежестта на короната in Bulgarian), also known as simply Tzar, is a real-time strategy game for Microsoft Windows published by TalonSoft and developed by the Bulgarian game developer company Haemimont Games. It received average reviews from critics.

== Gameplay ==
The gameplay is set in a fictional medieval age. The game is a basic real time strategy game that resembles the gameplay of the Age of Empires series. The basic goal is to conquer the neighbouring kingdoms and destroy all traces of them, or destroy their castles, depending on the selected playing mode. There are many different buildings and characters player can produce, each depending on which of the three races the player chooses to play as: European, Asian or Arabian. The main differences are the types of special buildings and the types of troops available.

There are four types of resources a player has to gather: food, wood, stone and gold. Food can be gathered by harvesting crops, milking cows or killing them for meat, as well as fishing if the map has lakes or rivers. Wood is gathered by chopping down trees, and gold and stone are gathered by mining. All units have health (hit points) but sorcerers also have mana which gradually regenerates when used to cast spells or summon creatures.

The main buildings that can be constructed by all three races are houses, farms, blacksmiths, workshops, barracks, stables, towers, walls, gates and inns. The players usually starts the game with a castle and a few peasants. All types of resources can be carried to the castle. Building houses increases the population limit. Farms can be used to produce cows and also as a place to gather food. Stables are required for some types of mounted soldiers, and blacksmiths provide various improvements to units' armour and fighting skills. Workshops are used to build siege machines. Towers are used for defence. Inns are the place where the player can exchange resources and later hire mercenaries and heroes. Docks can be built to fishing and travelling across the sea.

There are four strategies in which the player can take: religion (mosque- Arabians, cathedral-Europeans, Shaolin monastery-Asians), magic (mage tower-all races), war (warrior's academy-all races), or trade (merchant's guild-all races). The player takes a path by building the corresponding building. Due to the high cost of these elite buildings, the player can only take one of the strategic paths each with their own unique style.

Religion will allow the player to produce priests, spies, and elite religious unit. Priests have the ability to heal and bless units by increasing their stats for a short period of time. They also have a long line of sight to spot wizards and neutralize them with one long range shot making religion the perfect counter for a player taking the magic path. Spies have the ability to impersonate an opponent unit to infiltrate their kingdoms allowing the players to see what their opponents are doing. The player's opponent can command spies and move them around or even have them collect resources if player's spies impersonate a peasant. Spies can reveal their true selves at any time the players give the command. Europeans elite units are crusaders which are mounted units with high armor. They come in groups at a time and the player cannot produce more until the current group is completely killed. Arabians have Jihadi warriors which are an upgrade from a typical soldier. What makes them unique is that they are actually peasants. Peasants are much cheaper than the standard soldier, suggesting the player to spam peasants and converting them to Jihadi warriors and swarm the enemy. Asian's elite unit is the monk which are all purpose warriors. They have a good balance of attack and defense and can share their battle experience with other kung-Fu units.

Magic will allow the player to produce wizards and research spells. Wizards will start out with no abilities until they are researched from the mage tower. Each race have unique spells but they are all devastating for large groups of units making magic the perfect counter against a player taking the war path. In addition, after researching, wizards can summon magical creatures - giants and bats (Europeans), genies (Arabians) and dragons (Asians). They all have high attack and hit points but are vulnerable to priests.

War will allow the player to value each soldier by removing the cap leveling up allowing them to reach heroic status as they experience more and more battles. The player can also research faster experience gain and influence by heroes. The player taking this path will be able to hire mercenaries giving quality units at no time at all. This strategic path suggests leveling up units and swarming creating hordes of experienced warriors and heroes. Despite how strong religious units are, outnumbering eventually wins making war the perfect path against a player who has taken the religious path.

The trade path allows the player to trade with allies, gamble with resources, take up loans, and increase the population cap in order to produce more peasants to collect more resources. This path is more suited when playing with allies. In addition, the trade path allows the research of elite war galleons which are larger, stronger, and have longer attack range than the other war ships making trade a considerable path to take when playing in island maps. Lastly, the player can research the ability that allows european and arabian peasants to bribe enemy units as long as the price is right.

There is also a campaign option for single players in which the player must complete specific goals, such as destroying an enemy force, or protecting a citadel from attack. The campaign has a total of 20 missions.

Screenshot of gameplay in Tzar: The Burden of the Crown

The game also includes a map editor where players can create their own maps to play on with strategically placed rivers, forests, and resources to use to build their armies with. The game is best known for the first implementation of a full experience system for every unit in a RTS game. The game doesn't have the commonly known system of Warcraft III for heroes but still every unit has the potential to reach level twelve and thus gaining a heroic status. There is no limit of the "hero" units a player can have, as long as they can keep them alive.

== Plot ==
The kingdom of Keanor is under attack by dark forces and much lie in ruins. The old king has died and the son Prince Sartor's whereabouts are unknown.

Sartor is raised as a lumberjack in a village, unaware of his royal lineage as Prince. One day, mercenaries seeking Sartor raid the village, killing his uncle. A wizard named Ghiron arrives in time and saves him, revealing his royal lineage and promises to help restore the kingdom to its previous glory. Ghiron takes him to find allies, such as his father's guard captain Woolin. They save the capitol from being completely destroyed. The trio seek more and more allies, growing enough to be confident in the final battle. Having enough resources, they lead massive armies against the Messiah of Evil, the manifestation of evil on Earth.

Sartor slowly gains allies. He travels far and wide to find people. He finds allies in the Asians on a far northern continent and finds favor when he kills their old time foes. Sartor soon finds Arabian allies on a far continent. He gets taken prisoner one time and his allies break him out of his imprisonment. Eventually, he gets the confidence and his allies to find the final allies.

Then the now-King Sartor leads his army to defeat the Messiah of Evil and his city in one large battle. In the end, he recognizes that evil shall always remain.

== Release ==
The game was considered by Linux Game Publishing to be ported to Linux, but was rejected due to concerns within the company about its gameplay and after hearing negative comments about the game from the Linux gaming community.

The game got a re-release on the GOG.com platform on July 16, 2013, and on Steam on June 6, 2019.

== Reception ==
Reception

Aggregate score
Aggregator	Score
GameRankings	69%

Review scores
Publication	Score
CNET Gamecenter	7/10
Computer Games Magazine	3.5/5
Computer Games Strategy Plus	3/5
Computer Gaming World	3.5/5
Eurogamer	6/10
GamePro	3/5
GameSpot	6.4/10
GameSpy	80%
IGN	6.9/10
PC Gamer (US)	78%
PC Zone	65%

The game received average reviews according to the review aggregation website GameRankings.

The Spanish version became a hit in Spain, with sales of 50,000 units in the region by November 2000.
