= Rising Kingdoms =

2005 video game

- Developer: Haemimont Games
- Publisher: Black Bean Games
- Platform: Windows
- Release: EU: June 17, 2005
- Genre: Real-time strategy
- Modes: Single-player, multiplayer

Rising Kingdoms is a real-time strategy PC game developed by Haemimont Games and published by Black Bean Games. It was released on June 17, 2005. Rising Kingdoms is a real-time strategy game set in a fantasy world, which focuses on empire development and dynamic tactical battles and features both strategy and adventure modes in the fantasy world of Equiada. In strategy mode, the player is able to select 3 major races – Humans, Foresters and Darklings, and in addition to these three primary races, the player is able to capture, enslave and develop five independent nations – Shades, Nomads, Dragons, Trolls, and Elves. Combined with the player's main race they provide a valuable asset when clashing with their opponents. In adventure mode the player controls a group of heroes and a small squad of troops.

The game got a re-release on the Steam platform on July 23, 2019, and it supports multiplayer over LAN on the service.
