= Tropico 3 =

2009 video game

- Developers: Haemimont Games; Feral Interactive (OS X, Android, iOS)
- Publishers: Kalypso Media; Feral Interactive (OS X, Android, iOS)
- Director: Gabriel Dobrev
- Designer: Boian Spasov
- Programmer: Ivaylo Todorov
- Artist: Peter Stanimirov
- Series: Tropico
- Platforms: Microsoft Windows, Xbox 360, macOS, iOS, iPadOS, Android
- Release: Microsoft Windows; NA: October 20, 2009; PAL: November 13, 2009; Xbox 360; PAL: November 13, 2009; NA: February 16, 2010; macOS; PAL: January 9, 2012; NA: January 26, 2012; iPadOS; WW: December 18, 2018; iOS; WW: April 30, 2019; Android; WW: September 5, 2019
- Genres: Construction and management simulation; Political simulation
- Mode: Single-player

Tropico 3 is a video game developed by Haemimont Games and published by Kalypso Media. Like the previous games in the series, Tropico 3 is a construction and management simulation as well as a political simulation game, with emphasis on city building. As a thematic sequel to Tropico (unlike the pirate-themed sequel, Tropico 2), the game attempts to return to the roots of the series, which puts the player into the shoes of "El Presidente" – a ruler governing over an island banana republic.

The OS X version of the game was released on January 26, 2012, by Feral Interactive.

Feral Interactive released a redesigned version of Tropico 3 to iPad on December 18, 2018, under the name Tropico or known as Tropico Mobile, with an iPhone version following on April 30, 2019. An Android version of the game was released on September 5, 2019.

== Gameplay ==
Tourist district including an airport, hotels, a zoo, and others

Players begin having seized power of the Caribbean island country of Tropico, where they rule as "El Presidente". The game has a campaign with 15 different missions with varying objectives.

As "El Presidente", the player's main duties include managing development on the island, by ordering construction of various resources, industry and service buildings, and determining how these buildings operate. The player can also issue several different "edicts" to influence the island, such as new laws, policies, and diplomatic actions.

There are seven different political factions on the island (communists, capitalists, militarists, environmentalists, nationalists, religious faction and intellectuals) each with various demands, such as constructing a specific building and issuing a specific edict. Due to the game's Cold War setting, the player will have to manage relations with both the United States and the USSR, who will provide the player with yearly financial aid. Higher relations with a superpower will mean more aid and the possibility of an alliance, low relations will mean less aid and the danger of invasion by that superpower.

Other features include a time line editor that allows you to create your own fictitious historical events or enter real ones, custom avatar, political speeches, wide range of editing and modification functions, mission generator for random map creation, variety of online-functions such as high scores or visiting islands belonging to other players and a Latin soundtrack.

The game has a variety of humor elements including running satirical commentary by fictional radio station Tropico News Today, and subtle touches such as liaisons between priests and cabaret girls. The "loading" and "saving" screens have quotes from various leaders, politicians, and revolutionaries such as Che Guevara, Fidel Castro, Vladimir Lenin, Karl Marx, John F. Kennedy, Dwight Eisenhower, Augusto Pinochet, Nikita Khrushchev, Leon Trotsky, Mobutu Sese Seko, Todor Zhivkov, Vladimir Putin, Muammar Gaddafi, and Mahmoud Ahmadinejad.

=== Additions to Tropico ===
- Numerous random world events.
- A transport system allowing citizens to travel by cars.
- Avatar customization and control.
- Election speeches.
- Oil production is available as an industry for educated workers.
- Same-sex marriages and nuclear testing are available as edicts, with different results and requirements.
- New faction: Nationalists, who hate immigration and prefer a dominant Tropican workforce.
- A "vintage mode" for non-rotational 3D visuals.
- Gravel roads (roads with a low speed for countryside of the island)
- Ability to construct a sculpture of El Presidente (the player's avatar) on the island.

== Development ==
Tropico 3 was developed by Haemimont Games for both Xbox 360 and PC. Features include a new 3D game engine and a customizable avatar which you can travel across the island, interacting with the environment and population and the use of cars, trucks and limos. Like the original Tropico, the developers preserved the tongue-in-cheek humor of the game, as well as the basic game-play. In Tropico 3, the issues and problems of the island are explained by Juanito the DJ in humorous ways.

== Expansions ==
In March 2010, the expansion pack Absolute Power was announced, slated for release in Europe in 2010.

The expansion received an 8/10 on Game Zone, closing with "Absolute Power isn't a revolution, instead taking the framework laid out by the original game and building on it with new features and a wacky new campaign. The core mechanics are still the same, and the new campaign might be a turn off to sim fans looking for something more grounded and traditional. However, if you were a fan of Tropico 3 and want another reason to step into the role of El Presidente once more, then this is your chance." Absolute Power was released on PC as an expansion pack, and is included in the Macintosh version of the game.

The expansion pack gives the player a wider selection of edicts such as 'Print money', 'Free housing', 'Delete a Faction' and 'Shoot Juanito' (which involves blowing up Juanito's TNT Radio). These new edicts are called 'Megalomania edicts'; for each edict that the player releases they can gain a varying amount of megalomania score that counts at the end of the game. Also there is a new range of buildings, including 'Golden Statue' (in the likeness of 'El Presidente'), 'Garbage dump' and 'Balloon rides'. The Loyalist faction is also introduced; it is composed of the player's most loyal supporters. There is also a second radio DJ named Betty Boom who is head of the resistance movement against El Presidente.

== Editions ==
=== Steam Special Edition ===
The "Steam Special Edition" of Tropico 3 offers two additional maps for the sandbox mode and two additional costumes for the El Presidente avatar editor. The "Steam Special Edition" is only available through Steam. It was released on October 21, 2009, in North America but was originally listed to be released on the later date of October 25, 2009. The international release was on November 14, 2009.

=== Collector Edition ===
The Collector Edition, for which the content has never been revealed, was available to pre-order only on Amazon sites worldwide; however, on September 30, 2009, Amazon announced this collector edition had been canceled.

=== Gold Edition ===
On September 29, 2010, Kalypso released "Tropico 3: Gold Edition", which includes Tropico 3, the Absolute Power expansion, and an instruction book.

The GOG version of the Gold Edition includes Tropico 3, the Absolute Power expansion, 2 maps for the sandbox mode(Verde Playa, Coco Chico Map), 2 additional costumes for the El Presidente avatar editor, 2 additional accessories for the El Presidente avatar editor(Baseball Hat, Commie Hat), Artwork, Avatars, Manual, Soundtrack, and Wallpaper.

== Reception ==
Reception

Aggregate score
Aggregator	Score
Metacritic	PC: 79/100; X360: 75/100

Review scores
Publication	Score
Game Informer	8.75/10
GameSpot	8.0/10
IGN	8.4/10
X-Play	4 out of 5

Tropico 3 received generally favorable reviews at Metacritic, with an average of 79/100 on the PC, and 75/100 on the Xbox 360. GameSpot commented that "playing a banana republic dictator in Tropico 3 might not be easy, but it certainly is rewarding." GameZone's Dakota Grabowski gave the game a 7 out of 10, stating, "Containing a 15-mission campaign, short tutorial, sandbox mode and special challenges, Tropico 3 has enough replay value to keep players at bay for more than a month. If that doesn't satisfy the hunger, players are eligible to jump online and download user-created challenges to overcome. With personalities such as Fidel Castro and Che Guevara, Tropico 3 is an educational and entertainment piece that is well-deserving of a few playthroughs by all gamers."
