= Inquisition (video game) =

2002 video game

- Developer: 4X Studios
- Publisher: Wanadoo Edition
- Platform: Windows
- Release: FR: 29 November 2002; WW: April 2003
- Genre: Action-adventure
- Mode: Single-player

Inquisition is an action-adventure video game released in 2002 for Microsoft Windows. The game was developed by French company 4X Studios and published by Wanadoo Edition.

== Plot ==
The game is set in 1348 Paris, France, where the main character, a young thief named Matthew, has come to find his riches. He becomes imprisoned after a robbery, and meets Jacques, a former Knight Templar. Before Jacques dies he reveals clues which lead the player towards finding the treasure of the Templars.

== Reception ==
Reception

Review scores
Publication	Score
Jeuxvideo	12/20
PC Games	64%
