= Imperium Romanum (video game) =

2008 video game

Imperium Romanum Imperivm Civitas II
- Developer: Haemimont Games
- Publishers: PAL: Kalypso Media; NA: SouthPeak Games; ITA/SP: FX Interactive
- Platform: Windows
- Release: EU: February 22, 2008; NA: March 11, 2008; AU: April 11, 2008; Emperor Expansion: NA: July 30, 2008; EU: August 29, 2008
- Genres: City-building, real-time strategy
- Modes: Single-player, multiplayer

Imperium Romanum is a 2008 city-building video game for Windows developed by Haemimont Games and published by Kalypso Media (SouthPeak Games only licensed the game for a U.S. release by Kalypso). Imperium Romanum is a sequel to the 2006 game Glory of the Roman Empire, by the same developer. Players act as governor of a Roman province and must build and maintain a thriving and prosperous settlement. The game takes place during the time of the Roman Empire. Players build Roman towers, gates, and bridges and use currency to fund projects. The Italian and Spanish versions of the game are titled Imperivm: Civitas II.

A successor game, Grand Ages: Rome (also known as Imperivm: Civitas III), was released in 2009.

== Gameplay ==
Imperium Romanum features significantly improved graphics from its predecessor and also adds several large Roman monuments such as the Circus Maximus and the Colosseum. The game does not have a scripted campaign mode like some other city-building games, but instead has the player navigate different historical scenarios such as life in Pompeii under the terror of Mount Vesuvius. Along with maintaining cities, players must also keep them very well-organized and keep money evenly distributed among the people. If the people of the city experience extreme poverty, crime rates may increase, which has a number of negative effects on the city.

The game features fully rendered 3D structures and people and allows the player to zoom in and out of the scene as well as rotate the camera a full 360 degrees. While much of the game is focused on building and maintaining cities, there are some RTS elements when opposing cities and civilizations do battle with the player's. Along with building fortified walls and towers around their cities to prevent enemy attacks, players may also build objects such as trebuchets to go on the offensive against opposing nations.

== Expansion pack ==
An expansion pack entitled Imperium Romanum: Emperor Expansion was released in the summer of 2008 in North America and Europe.

== Reception ==
=== Imperium Romanum ===
Imperium Romanum

Aggregate score
Aggregator	Score
Metacritic	63/100

Review scores
Publication	Score
1Up.com	D
GamePro	3.5/5
GameSpot	3.5/10
IGN	6/10
PC Gamer (UK)	61%
PC Gamer (US)	50%
PC PowerPlay	6/10
PC Zone	75%
411Mania	6.6/10

The game received "mixed" reviews according to the review aggregation website Metacritic. A review in GamesRadar+ praised the game's pace, buildings and user interface, while criticizing its uninspired mechanics and underwhelming design. IGN gave a similarly mixed review.

=== Emperor Expansion ===
Imperium Romanum: Emperor Expansion

Aggregate score
Aggregator	Score
Metacritic	59/100

Review score
Publication	Score
IGN	5.9/10

The Emperor Expansion pack received a "mixed" review based solely on IGN's review according to Metacritic.
