= Infinity Online =

2006 video game

- Developer(s): Windysoft
- Publisher(s): game & game
- Engine: SpeedTree
- Platform(s): Windows
- Release: October 12, 2006
- Genre(s): Action
- Mode(s): Multiplayer

Infinity Online is a free action MMOG created by the Korean software company Windysoft. It was supposed to be released on October 12, 2006, but due to an IDC problem, was released internationally on October 17. Gameplay is similar in style to Rakion with separate game rooms for players to enter, and players have the option of using a mouse and keyboard or a controller to control their character. There are both player versus player and mission modes where players cooperate to defeat AI enemies. The in-game currency is the luna. Game Tribe is currently working on the Europe version of Infinity Online.

For contractual and other reasons, Gametribe has implemented an IP block on users in the United States.

== Gameplay ==
=== PvP ===
In PvP mode, players can host a game with guards or without guards. In a game with guards, each player receives four guards (different guards can be purchased with luna) and can use a number of items spread throughout the map to aid them or harm other players. A game without guards does not include items. Additionally, hosts can choose to make the matches free-for-all (solo), team (players designate teams), or random (teams chosen randomly).

=== Mission ===
In mission mode, players cooperate with each other to complete a certain goal that varies between missions. Ranks that decide the rewards are given to the players based on performance. More difficult missions require that the player who wishes to host them purchases temporary mission licenses. Some missions have an admission fee that is determined by the difficulty selected for the mission.

=== Characters ===
At the beginning of the game, players can choose from four different characters, each of which use different weapons and attacks. Three different variations exist for each of these characters: normal, swimsuit, and uniform.

Characters are available in the swimsuit variety, which are purchased separately with Luna and have different skills from their normal counterparts. They also use the same weapons with the exception of an expensive summer weapon available only to the swimsuit variety of the character.

Uniform characters give the same bonus as swimsuits.

=== Store ===
There are many items in Infinity Online that let players change their appearance, or gain extra abilities. These can be bought at the store, or earned through missions. Store items are purchasable by anyone, and only require that you have enough Luna.

At the store, players can use Luna to buy armor for a character. Armor does not affect performance until it's infused with runes. Weapons can be bought alone or with elemental runes already infused. Besides armor, weapons, and heroes, there are many other items the player can purchase.
