= Tropico 4 =

2011 city management video game

- Developers: Haemimont Games; Feral Interactive (Mac OS X)
- Publishers: Kalypso Media; FX Interactive (Italy and Spain); Feral Interactive (Mac OS X)
- Director: Gabriel Dobrev
- Producers: Dennis Blumenthal; Christian Schlütter
- Designer: Boian Spasov
- Programmer: Ivko Stanilov
- Artist: Peter Stanimirov
- Series: Tropico
- Platforms: Microsoft Windows, Xbox 360, OS X
- Release: Microsoft Windows; EU: August 26, 2011; NA: August 30, 2011; Xbox 360; EU: October 21, 2011; NA: October 21, 2011; OS X; WW: July 25, 2013
- Genres: Construction and management simulation, political simulation
- Mode: Single-player

Tropico 4 is a construction and management and political simulation video game developed by Haemimont Games and published by Kalypso Media. It was first released in August 2011 for the Microsoft Windows platform. Like the first and third games in the series, Tropico 4 centers on a customizable main character titled "El Presidente" – the ruler who runs an island-based banana republic. The Mac OS X version of the game (Tropico 4: Gold Edition, which includes the Modern Times expansion pack) was released by Feral Interactive on July 25, 2013, as well as DLC packs Dash for Growth and Captain of Industry. The State of Emergency DLC pack was released by Feral on April 3, 2014.

Changes in Tropico 4 include the added ability to monitor imports (in previous versions, only exports could be monitored), more interactions with factions and foreign countries, and support for Facebook and Twitter status updates.

== Gameplay ==
Gameplay screenshot.

The game has ten preconfigured maps, but the player can make their own island by choosing "Random Island". Upon choosing a random island, a player may customize the size of the island, vegetation, mineral deposits, and elevation, as well as other game parameters. There are various expansion packs which give access to more islands.

After choosing the island, the player may choose a premade avatar, some based on various Latin American and Caribbean leaders (such as Fidel Castro, Augusto Pinochet, "Papa Doc" Duvalier), or they can create their own avatar. For custom avatars, players may choose: gender, costumes, skin tone, hat, hairstyle, accessories, mustache, beard, earrings, traits, quality, and rise to power. After completing one mission, the character's current traits will level up.

As El Presidente, the player can see every citizen's needs, happiness, skills, thoughts, and political ideology. The demands of Tropicans include food, health, leisure, and faith. These are fulfilled by erecting specific buildings. For example, if the citizens demand leisure, then the player must try to build a pub, restaurant, movie theater, or some other form of entertainment. Each individual citizen has a unique set of characteristics that influences their motivation, priorities and actions.

A citizen unable to satisfy their needs will become unhappy and may protest peacefully, become a criminal, or join the rebels. Individual protesters negatively affect nearby citizens' respect for El Presidente, potentially influencing the next election, though El Presidente may personally calm the protester down. The player loses the game if El Presidente loses an election. As a group, rebels will periodically attack and attempt to destroy buildings. If they destroy the palace, the game is lost. Palace guards and an army are needed to defend against rebel attacks.

There are several political factions in Tropico 4, each with its own demands and expectations. Maintaining good relations with these factions is important, as satisfying their demands increases the happiness of their supporters, while poor relations can lead to faction-specific disasters. Because the factions often have competing interests, balancing their demands is a central part of the game's strategy. Appealing to the factions' needs is crucial to keeping the populace under control and avoiding being overthrown, be it by a coup d'état or by losing one of the elections held occasionally.

=== Campaign ===
The game's campaign consists of 20 missions spread over 10 different maps. They start out with the player character, "El Presidente", having seized control of the island of Tropico. Imports can be monitored as well as exports (whereas the previous games in the series only allowed for monitoring of exports). Tropico 4 also includes more countries to negotiate with. A council of ministers exists which the player can consult on a range of different issues. The player will have to deal with natural disasters and the demands of different political factions each with its own ideological outlook.

The game has a variety of humorous elements including running satirical commentary by the fictional radio station Tropico News Today, and subtle touches such as liaisons between priests and cabaret girls. The "loading" and "saving" screens show quotes from various leaders, politicians, and revolutionaries such as Che Guevara, Fidel Castro, Vladimir Lenin, Karl Marx, John F. Kennedy, Dwight D. Eisenhower, Augusto Pinochet, Nikita Khrushchev, Leon Trotsky, Mobutu Sese Seko, Todor Zhivkov, Vladimir Putin, Josip Broz Tito, Muammar Gaddafi, Ferdinand Marcos, Imelda Marcos, and Mahmoud Ahmadinejad. The soundtrack of Tropico 4, like its predecessors, features Latin music drawn mainly from the albums Elementos and Oñejo by Alex Torres and His Orchestra.

=== Factions ===
The Communists represent the largest faction, deeply focused on improving both housing and healthcare on the island. Led by Comrade Vasquez, an eccentric figure known for his frequent use of communist slogans, their influence is substantial. Should the Communists become dissatisfied, rebels from Cuba will start to infiltrate the island, posing a direct threat to El Presidente's regime.

Capitalists are the wealthy and enterprising people of the island. Naturally, their agenda pits them against the Communists. They desire a low crime rate, charging money for housing, and a diverse and competitive economy. They are led by Antonio Lopez, a wealthy opportunist who promotes the sale of dangerous products and sells firearms to the rebels to earn money. If the Capitalists' demands are not met, they will resort to thievery to make money and will steal a portion of all income, mainly from exports.

Environmentalists strive to preserve the natural beauty of Tropico. Led by the hippie Sunny Flowers, an anchorwoman and conspiracy theorist, they oppose any efforts to scar the environment, even for economic purposes like logging and mining, and thus are opponents of the Capitalists. Passing anti-pollution laws appeases them. If not appeased, Environmentalists will attempt to blockade industrial buildings.

The Religious are a conservative Catholic faction led by Reverend Estaban, a drunkard who uses rum during his sermons to worship God. They are very concerned about faith among Tropicans, and building churches and cathedrals increases their influence. If the Religious faction is upset, priests and bishops will speak against El Presidente, spreading dissent among any who attend sermons on the island.

Militarists are interested in the defense of Tropico. They are quite sizeable, and lack of support might result in rebellions, terrorist attacks, or invasions. General Rodriguez leads the militarists. The Militarists are mostly detractors of the Intellectuals, and are thus mostly illiterate. Low wages or low overall satisfaction of soldiers may cause the Militarists to stage a coup.

Intellectuals are more progressive, in contrast to the Religious and Militarist factions. They are led by Miss Pineapple, who is also El Presidente's lover and a cabaret dancer. The Intellectuals prefer edicts that benefit the educational sector. Policies that interfere with the free spread of knowledge, such as book burning, upset them deeply. Upsetting the Intellectuals will cause student protests, and result in the cessation of Tropicans graduating from high schools and colleges.

Nationalists are concerned with caring for and preserving the Tropican people and their customs. They generally oppose immigrants (especially open-door immigration policies), who, according to leader El Diablo, a violent skinhead, take lucrative jobs away from Tropicans. They will oppose any foreign-friendly policies and are at loggerheads with both Communists and Capitalists. When ignored, Nationalists will start riots on the island. These riots quickly escalate into battles between Tropicans and immigrants.

Loyalists are a faction who are always loyal to El Presidente. They are led by El Presidente's personal advisor, Penultimo. Most of their members have below-average intelligence and have been brainwashed with all the propaganda glorifying El Presidente. They will never rebel; in return, they demand that El Presidente act like a "true leader", shun democracy, and cultivate his image through facilities such as a museum dedicated to El Presidente's childhood. Should they become upset, the Loyalists will begin to lose supporters.

== Plot ==
The game follows the protagonist, El Presidente, as he works towards restoring the power that he lost in the Caribbean after averting a nuclear war that the US vice president perpetrated in order to facilitate his own rise to power. It is divided into three acts:

El Presidente arrives at his new island where he begins to work toward his goal of building an ideal nation for his people. To do so, he focuses his administration on several islands, developing the economic potential of each one, until he is ousted from power after being framed for the murder of the current US president. El Presidente is then forced to flee his country and travels to other parts of Tropico.

After fleeing his country and assuming a new identity, El Presidente begins his revenge by establishing a base of power at Isla Oscura. There, he learns that he was the victim of a conspiracy involving Keith Preston, the CEO of Fruitas Inc. (a parody of Minor C. Keith and Andrew W. Preston and their United Fruit Company); the rebel leader Marco Moreno (a parody of Che Guevara); UN Inspector Brunhilde Van Hoof (a parody of Margaret Thatcher); and his former mentor Generalissimo Santana (a parody of Fidel Castro). After enacting his revenge on the conspirators and clearing his name, El Presidente regains his position as the rightful ruler of Tropico.

Reinstated into power, El Presidente focuses on rebuilding his nation, until his former enemies reappear and sell him information about the true mastermind behind his downfall, the US vice president Nick Richards (a parody of Richard Nixon), who had the US president killed so he could become president himself. Around this time, perestroika hits the USSR and Tropico offers their assistance to the nation in exchange for evidence incriminating Nick Richards that leads to his demise. El Presidente and his antagonists show parallels to Salvador Allende and his ousting, with El Presidente having socialist policies by default and being overthrown by a dictator backed by both Richard Nixon and Margaret Thatcher stand-ins.

== Development ==
The game was announced in the middle of August 2010 in a press release by publisher Kalypso Media. Tropico 4 was released on both Xbox 360 and PC, as was its predecessor Tropico 3. Unlike its predecessors, Tropico 4 was available through the Onlive platform.

=== Expansion ===
An expansion, titled Modern Times, was released on March 27, 2012. It features a new single-player 12-mission campaign which takes place one year after the events of Tropico 4. After El Presidente's success in rebuilding Tropico, he leaves on a well-deserved vacation, only to find when he returns that his lackey Penultimo has predictably run the entire nation into the ground during the 2008 financial crisis. While working to put the country back on track, El Presidente crosses paths with the elusive shadow organization "The Conclave", and it's up to him to help save the world again while lining his pockets.

Modern Times also adds a timeline element, where real-world historical events affect gameplay. In addition, new buildings are introduced in accordance to the timeline.

On November 3, 2011, the first of many DLC packs was released, titled Junta Military. Subsequent DLC packs include Plantador, Quick Dry Cement, Pirate Heaven, Megalopolis, Vigilante, Voodoo, Propaganda!, The Academy and Apocalypse. Each DLC pack includes new buildings, a new island, a new mission, a new trait, and, depending on the DLC, new clothing options for El Presidente and new decor.

=== Demo ===
A demo version was released on the Xbox Live Marketplace and Steam. It contains 4 tutorial missions and 1 campaign mission. However, many buildings are not available for construction in this version.

== Reception ==
Reception

Aggregate score
Aggregator	Score
Metacritic	PC: 78/100; X360: 77/100

Review scores
Publication	Score
Destructoid	8/10
Eurogamer	7/10
Game Informer	8.5/10
GameRevolution	7/10
GameSpot	7/10
GamesRadar+	3.5/5
IGN	8.5/10
PC Gamer (US)	72/100

The game has received generally positive reviews and holds a 78/100 score on Metacritic based on 46 reviews for the PC version and 77/100 based on 18 reviews for the Xbox 360 version. Certain reviewers praised the game's visuals and attention to detail, while describing it as not particularly challenging. GameSpot commented that "Tropico 4 is a likable and engaging sequel that expands on its predecessor but doesn't offer much new depth." IGN stated that "if you're the type that's spent hours with the likes of Civilization or SimCity, or has an unhealthy need to be in control, then it's time to become El Presidente." Destructoid and Game Informer noted that the game didn't do enough to iterate upon its predecessor, but praised it for being better, with both outlets ultimately recommending the game. Eurogamer wrote that the game didn't address enough of Tropico 3's limitations, stating, "It's hard not to like Tropico 4, because it's based on a solid foundation that is naturally engaging...Its tragedy is that it hasn't bothered to build anything worthwhile on top of that foundation..." GamesRadar+ praised the game for its accessibility and the vast breadth of freedom present, while lamenting its lack of depth.
