= Imperialism: Flag of an Empire =

1900 speech by William Jennings Bryan

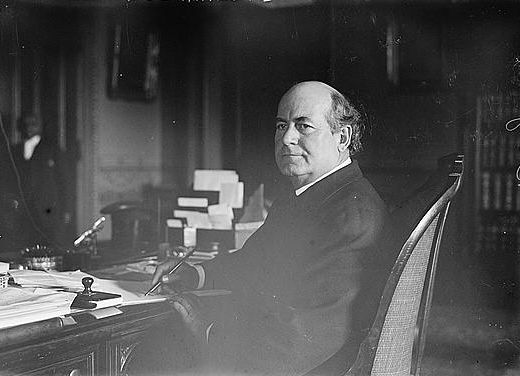
- William Jennings Bryan during his 1900 presidential campaign.
- Date: August 8, 1900; 126 years ago
- Location: Military Park, Indianapolis, Indiana, U.S.; 39°46′13″N 86°10′07″W

"Imperialism: Flag of an Empire" is a famous speech by William Jennings Bryan that was delivered in Indianapolis, Indiana, on August 8, 1900. It was made in the context of the Spanish–American War in Cuba and in the Philippines and its aftermath.

In the speech, Bryan, a prominent American politician of the 1890s, warned against the harms and hubris of American imperialism. The speech is the one that is most commented on and his only speech whose main subject was imperialism that has been transcribed.

Bryan calls for a rejection of imperialism in American policy on the grounds that it is directly opposed to basic American values. He makes several references throughout the speech that call upon the ideals of democracy and basic human rights.

== Political context ==
Bryan gave the speech during his campaign for his candidacy for the presidency in the 1900 election, when he ran under the banner of anti-imperialism for the Democratic Party. Both the Democratic Party and Bryan posed anti-imperialism as the central issue of the campaign. The Republican Party defended its proposed policies of annexing the Philippines as a form of expansionism that would make the United States more powerful. Before the 1900 election, Bryan was not clearly anti-imperialist; his stance on imperialist policies had shifted over time, as seen by his initial support of the Spanish–American War and the Treaty of Paris.

== Content and themes ==
Bryan focuses on how imperialism is a moral issue for the American peoples. It is framed as an attack on McKinley's foreign policy in the context of the Spanish–American War and the discussion of the annexation of the Philippines. Bryan argues that sustaining an imperialist policy would necessitate maintaining a large standing army; cultivating a culture of militarism; and forcing the Filipinos to be subjects of the United States, rather than citizens of their own state. Bryan also contrasts American policy in Cuba against the situation in the Philippines by saying that giving the Cubans freedom and not doing the same with the Filipinos is contradictory and goes against the precedent set in Cuba. In the speech, Bryan states that America should not use its power to spread its forces. He appeals to the values that he says are inherent in American democracy and states that America should follow the words of its past presidents, specifically Abraham Lincoln and Thomas Jefferson.

He responds to the common arguments that the Republicans put forth in defense of imperialism, specifically the arguments based in the power of the United States in the international order, the commercial incentive, and the spread of Christianity. Firstly, Bryan says that accepting an imperialist policy would abandon the heritage of American democracy that made the country the world power that it then was. Secondly, he says that trade done under the mantle of colonialism would be neither legitimate nor long sustainable. Thirdly, he says that fighting wars in the name of Christianity is "gun-powder gospel" and would defeat the purpose of such wars.
