= Trade Empires =

2001 video game

- United Kingdom box art
- Developer: Frog City Software
- Publishers: NA: Eidos Interactive; EU: Take-Two Interactive
- Platform: Microsoft Windows
- Release: NA: 13 September 2001; EU: 2 November 2001
- Genre: Business simulation game
- Mode: Single-player

Trade Empires is a pausable real-time strategy game developed by Frog City Software in San Francisco and published by Take-Two Interactive and Eidos Interactive. In the game, players build transportation and trade networks that evolve over the course of centuries as technology develops. It was released on October 20, 2001, for Microsoft Windows. During development its working title was The Silk Road; however, this was changed by Take-Two and Eidos as they were concerned about the title being too highbrow.

== Gameplay ==
The game features 19 campaign scenarios based on historical trading periods in human history. A step-by-step walkthrough is playable by users on the Learn to Play mode for the Shang dynasty of China (1700–1100 BC). The game imitates the historical period through the supply and demand process of that time. Goods such as rice, millet, silk cloth and jade idols are traded during the campaign. The Tang and Song era (AD 615–1280) of China is also depicted, although not as a Learn to Play option.

Other Asian trading periods include First Civilization (2500–2310 BC); based around the regions of the Indus Valley, Afghanistan, Zagros, Mesopotamia and Assyria.

== Reception ==
Reception

Aggregate score
Aggregator	Score
Metacritic	69/100

Review scores
Publication	Score
AllGame	2.5/5
Computer Games Magazine	3/5
Computer Gaming World	3/5
Eurogamer	8/10
GameSpot	6.8/10
GameSpy	70%
GameZone	8/10
IGN	8.3/10
Jeuxvideo.com	12/20
PC Gamer (US)	56%

According to review aggregator website Metacritic, Trade Empires holds a score of 69, indicating "mixed or average" reviews, based on nine reviews.
