= Invention Studio =

- Developer: Music Pen
- Publisher: Discovery Channel Multimedia
- Platforms: Windows; Macintosh
- Release: 1996

Invention Studio is a 1996 educational video game developed by Music Pen and published by Discovery Channel Multimedia. It is based on the Discovery Channel series Invention and is for ages 9 and up.

== Gameplay ==
The program takes place in a large Invention Studio divided into themed rooms, each offering a different activity. Guided by Doc Howard, the player moves between areas that support inventing. The Window shows short videos about inventions, while the Brainstormer prompts idea‑generation. The Journal stores developing concepts, and the Maximachine provides information on past inventions and inventors. In the Gadgetorium, players assemble machines to guide a mouse through a maze. The Patent Office allows them to patent their creations. The Powerhouse explores different energy sources, and the Machine Shop assigns tasks such as designing a robot DJ or an electromagnetic bell. In the Garage, players design cars, planes, and other vehicles and test how they perform. Doc Howard explains each area and offers challenges as players explore the studio.

== Reception ==
Reception

Review scores
Publication	Score
All Game Guide	4/5
Evansville Courier and Press	4/4

All Game Guide called Invention Studio a great program for where kids can invent and design their own inventions.

Invention Studio was a finalist in the Best Home Creativity Software Program category in the 1997 CODiE Awards.
