= Imperialism II: Age of Exploration =

1999 video game

Imperialism II: The Age of Exploration
- Developer: Frog City Software
- Publisher: Strategic Simulations
- Designers: Ben Polk; Bill Spieth; Ted Spieth
- Platforms: Mac OS, Windows
- Release: NA: March 23, 1999; EU: April 9, 1999
- Genre: Turn-based strategy
- Modes: Single-player, multiplayer

Imperialism II: Age of Exploration is a turn-based strategy computer game developed by Frog City Software and published by Strategic Simulations, Inc. (SSI) in 1999. It is the successor to the 1997 game Imperialism. In Imperialism II, the player starts as ruler of a 16th-century European country, and must build an empire.

Since 2001 Ubisoft owns the rights to the Imperialism trademark.

== Gameplay ==
Imperialism II is a turn based 4X game, where you have to "eXplore, eXpand, eXploit, and eXterminate" in order to achieve victory. The game however focus on the economic aspect by introducing the concepts of variable worker productivity, variable terrain productivity, labor allocation, resource allocation and logistics.

=== The economic aspect ===
==== Allocative dilemmas ====
What should the Merchant Marine transport?

The game presents the player with an economic problem that is composed of three allocative dilemmas plus the necessity to supply food for workers and military units plus the necessity to finance scientific research.

1. - Transportation dilemma: Where to allocate the limited transportation capacity of the merchant marine? The options can be to transport raw materials and precious materials from the New World, to import goods or to transport fish.
2. - Labor allocation dilemma: Given the collected raw materials, which semi-finished materials should the workers produce?
3. - Resource allocation dilemma: Which use should be given to the semi-finished materials produced by the labor force?

Which semi-finished material should the workers produce?

Raw materials which depend terrain improvements to be extracted and on logistics to be transported have to be processed by workers into semi-finished materials. Those semi-finished materials can then be turned into units or workers, used to increase terrain productivity or used to sustain workers of higher productivity. Logistics also depends on semi-finished materials for expansion through additions to the merchant marine and improvements to the road network.

On Imperialism II raw materials have to be transported first and then processed, access is not enough. In order to build a unit or an improvement a specific quantity of specific raw materials needs to be transported and processed into semi-finished materials before it becomes possible to build a unit. An example, to build 1 Ship-of-the-line unit the following quantities of semi-finished materials are required:

Notice that creating military units and merchant ships consumes 1 worker and semi-finished materials.

- 14 lumber + 8 bronze + 4 fabric + 1 worker

This requirement represents in raw-material terms the following:

- 28 timber + 8 tin ore + 8 copper ore + 12 (wool or cotton)

But in order to build another unit, such as a Carbine Cavalry a different mix is needed:

- 3 fabric + 6 steel + 5 horses + 1 worker

In raw material terms this necessity would mean:

- 6 iron ore + 6 coal + 5 horses + 10 (wool or cotton)

==== Labor productivity and food supply ====
Four different levels of worker productivity. Note that the population equals 248 and that the 64 workers produce 124 units of labor, instead of just 64.

Every worker, ship and military unit requires one unit of food (wheat, meat or fish) every turn. Because of this necessity, enlarging the labor force depends on the increase of the food supply. Increasing the food supply demands semi-finished materials in order to improve farms or expand the merchant marine which can transport fish.

Labor has 4 different levels of productivity. Each higher level of productivity requires a unique type of luxury. This element of the game allows the player to increase total production without enlarging the labor force which would require raising the food supply.

Levels of Productivity
Worker	Peasant	Apprentice	Journeyman	Master
Productivity	1	4	6	8
Luxury Consumed	None	Refined sugar	Cigar	Fur hat

==== The Treasury ====
Avoiding bankruptcy and keeping the Empire solvent is also a challenge. That's because the Empire's treasury finances scientific research, military invasions and the importing of goods. It also pays for the creation of civilian units and for the upgrade of the work force. On the Diplomatic arena the treasury finances grants to foreign nations and trade subsidies.

The treasury has as sources of income the mining of precious material, the exporting of goods and overseas profits. Overseas profits is income generated by the export of raw-material collected from foreign lands bought by the Empire.

Income from precious materials
	Spices	Silver	Gold	Gems	Diamonds
Income per unit every turn	$50	$100	$200	$300	$400

=== Victory Condition ===
The game is won when any of the "great powers" (France, Holland, Spain, England, Portugal or Sweden) controls more than one-half of the Old World. Control over other countries can be achieved by conquest or by diplomatic means (influencing "minor nations" Denmark, Germany, Ireland, Italy, Scotland, Switzerland and even the "great powers", so they would finally join the player's empire), or most often a combination of the two. Control of the New World is not relevant for the victory condition.

== Differences from Imperialism I ==
The main novelty in Imperialism II compared to its predecessor, is the addition of the New World, which is unknown and has to be explored. Unlike in Imperialism I, only part of the world is visible at the start and this part is the Old World. The other half of the world is the New World, which must be explored by ships and explorers. The New World has resources that don't exist in the Old World; those resources are the precious materials (spices, silver, gold, gems and diamonds) and the luxuries (sugar cane, tobacco and fur).

Another difference between the games is that Imperialism II starts in the 16th Century during the Age of Exploration whereas Imperialism starts in the 19th century during the Industrial Revolution.

== Reception ==
According to former members of Frog City Software at Sidecar Studios, Imperialism II "exceed[ed] sales goals by 50%" and "matched the sales of its predecessor", whose sales had surpassed 300,000 copies.

Imperialism II received favorable reviews from game critics.

- GameRankings - 84/100 score - Average based on 15 different reviews of the game.
- GameSpot - 8/10 score - The review wrote: " Imperialism II is a more refined and interesting use of the same system" and added: "Frog City has done an excellent job of it with Imperialism II." The food supply requirement was criticized and called "a bit tedious".
- IGN - 8.4/10 score - This review called the game "impressive" and said "It's complex as hell, but it's a lot of fun".
- ZDNet - 5/5 score- "With deeper gameplay, tactical combat, and AI, the new game system is easier to learn and play than the original."
- GamePro - 4.5/5 score - "A great update to a great strategy game."
- CNET's Gamecenter.com - 8/10 score - "In the long term, Imperialism II: Age of Exploration provides epic strategic gaming with random maps and multiplayer support."
- Adrenaline Vault - 4/5 score - "It's a solid title that nicely combines some quality features into an attractive title. [T]hose of you who thirst for the thrill of constant combat might feel bogged down in some of the other elements."
- Strategy Gaming Online - 8.6/10 score - "In every aspect, then, Imp2 is an improvement over Imp1, which should give some idea of really how good a game this is". This review however considered excessive the amount of importance given to the economic aspect of the game.
- Tom vs. Bruce from the Games for Windows: The Official Magazine - Imperialism II was featured on their column in the March 2007 issue. Although it wasn't a review Tom Chick wrote: "Until Civilization IV came out, it [Imperialism II] was my favorite turn-based strategy game." Bruce Geryk also expressed his opinion: "Imperialism II is probably my favorite game of the 1990s. Since it's my favorite, it kind of goes without saying that it must be the best."

Next Generation reviewed the PC version of the game, rating it four stars out of five, and stated that "it's proof positive that turn-based strategy is far from dead."
