= Impressionists (video game) =

1997 video game

- Developer(s): Index+
- Platform(s): Windows 95, Macintosh
- Release: 1997
- Genre(s): Educational

Les impressionnistes (Impressionists) is an educational video game released in 1997. The game focused on was developed by the French developer Index+ as a co-production with Réunion des Musées Nationaux.

The game was developed by Claire Barbillon from an idea from the Museum of Orsay, using QuickTime technology. It features 200 works of art from 45 artists. André Dussollier narrates.
