= Frog City Software =

American video game developer

Frog City Software, Inc.
- Company type: Subsidiary
- Industry: Video games
- Founded: 1994; 32 years ago
- Founders: Rachel Bernstein; Bill Spieth; Ted Spieth
- Defunct: 2006
- Fate: Dissolved
- Successor: Sidecar Studios
- Headquarters: San Francisco, California, U.S.
- Key people: Rachel Bernstein (president)
- Parent: Take-Two Interactive; (2003–2005); 2K; (2005–2006)

Frog City Software, Inc. was an American video game developer based in San Francisco, California. The company was founded in 1994 by Rachel Bernstein, Bill Spieth and Ted Spieth, acquired by Take-Two Interactive in 2003, became part of the 2K label in 2005, and was closed down in 2006.

== History ==
Frog City Software was founded by Rachel Bernstein, Bill Spieth and Ted Spieth in 1994. In 2003, following the release of Tropico 2: Pirate Cove, Frog City Software was acquired by Take-Two Interactive. On January 25, 2005, Take-Two Interactive announced the opening of publishing label 2K, which would henceforth manage its development studios, including Frog City Software.

On June 6, 2006, Snow, a game about drug trafficking in development at Frog City Software at the time, was canceled. It was presumed that the move occurred as an immediate consequence of the 2005 Hot Coffee controversy. Frog City Software shut down later that year. Veterans of the studio established Sidecar Studios as a successor but disbanded a year later to pursue other interests.

== Games developed ==
Year	Title	Platform(s)	Publisher
1997	Imperialism	Microsoft Windows	Strategic Simulations
1999	Imperialism II: The Age of Exploration	macOS	The Learning Company
1999	Imperialism II: The Age of Exploration	Microsoft Windows	Strategic Simulations
2001	Trade Empires	Microsoft Windows	Eidos Interactive
2003	Tropico 2: Pirate Cove	Microsoft Windows	Gathering of Developers

=== Cancelled ===
- Pantheon
- Snow
