= Tropico 5 =

2014 video game

- Developer: Haemimont Games
- Publisher: Kalypso Media
- Director: Gabriel Dobrev
- Designer: Boian Spasov
- Programmer: Alexander Andonov
- Series: Tropico
- Platforms: Microsoft Windows; OS X; Linux; Xbox 360; PlayStation 4; Xbox One
- Release: Microsoft Windows; WW: 23 May 2014; OS X, Linux; WW: 19 September 2014; Xbox 360; WW: 11 November 2014; PlayStation 4; EU: 24 April 2015; NA: 28 April 2015; Xbox One; NA: 24 May 2016; AU: 26 May 2016; EU: 27 May 2016
- Genres: Construction and management simulation, government simulation
- Modes: Single-player, multiplayer

Tropico 5 is a construction and management simulation video game developed by Haemimont Games. It was released for Microsoft Windows in May 2014, with versions for Linux, OS X and Xbox 360 released later in 2014 as well as versions for PlayStation 4 and Xbox One released in April 2015 and May 2016 respectively.

For the first time in the Tropico series, the game features cooperative and competitive multiplayer for up to four players. The players are able to build cities on the same island, allowing the choice of working with one another, or against.

== Gameplay ==
In-game screenshot of a lumber mill

There are a number of additions to the Tropico 5 game mechanics from the previous iteration of the series, notably the ability to advance to a new era if certain requirements are met; such as having written the constitution of Tropico. Tropico 5 includes 4 different eras, starting from Colonial Era, World Wars, Cold War and progressing up to Modern Times which allows progress from the 19th to the 21st century. Another gameplay mechanic is 'El Presidente' now has a dynastic family which will be present on the island. The trading, research, renovation and exploration features have also been overhauled. With multiplayer, diplomacy allows the players to share resources, construction workers, and electricity. Additionally, they are able to help each other with cash. Finally, players are able to compete and even declare war on each other.

According to series producer Bisser Dyankov, Tropico 5 is designed to be much denser than its predecessors. The citizens are the lifeblood of the island to grow the island empire and for the sustainable growth, the players need to make them happy. Due to the needs of the 10 different in-game factions, one man's happiness may be another man's frustration. And their allegiances may change depending on the sort of government you run or the buildings you build. Due to the constitutional changes, some of the faction happiness may drop or rise depending on their allegiance to their factions.

=== Campaign and strategy ===
Tropico 5, in the base game, comes with 15 missions, split into two parts. In both parts, you advance through all of the four eras, completing various objectives with one final objective for each mission.

In the first part of the game, Tropico must declare independence from the Crown, a spin on the British Empire. The player is also introduced to the campaign's primary antagonist, Leon Kane, the leader of The Order. Once the island has gained its independence (and thus ending the Colonial Era), the player, represented by "El Presidente" and his dynasty, must win three bets against the US president to befriend him; at the same time, a real estate tax must be paid continuously to the Crown. In the next mission, the island must build and maintain a large army in order to fend off a pending invasion. Once the invasion is defeated, the player must accrue a large sum in their Swiss Bank Account in order to purchase Switzerland and get "Dr. Zweistein" onto the island. This leads onto a demonstration of the tourism mechanic, in which the player is tasked with paying fees to The Order while, at the same time, trying to get enough tourists onto the island. Once that is accomplished, the player must build a Nuclear Program building to avoid World War III. Then, the island must produce and export Uranium for The Order, while at the same time, stopping the protests and increasing strikes from destroying the economy. At the end of this mission, Kane's plan is revealed: becoming dissilusioned with his mission after seeing complete Human apathy for the countless conflicts, the Cold War's proxy wars chiefly among them, he deemed mankind too far gone and decided to use the uranium to build enough nuclear missiles and launch an attack on the entire world, killing most of the population before then restarting it with a small pool of Order-picked survivors. The player must then generate enough research points to build a time machine (thanks to Zweistein from earlier) and travel back in time, thus beginning part two and averting the nuclear war.

In the second part, Tropico must produce and export gold to the Pirate King in order to free the King's son, for the Crown, all while dealing with constant pirate attacks. The next mission has the player exporting food to the King. After this, the island must amass a fortune high enough to become the richest country in the Caribbean. Once this has been done, the second military-themed mission has the player building a large army, not to defend, but to invade the island of Cayo de Fortuna. The location of Kane is discovered, before he has the opportunity to start a nuclear war, and the player must complete a variety of tasks that help to assassinate him. After this has been completed, Tropico must export resources in order to dissolve the USSR, and then bring all the modern superpowers together and dealing with constant military threats to end the campaign.

=== Sandbox ===
In the game's sandbox mode, the player has a choice between choosing a pre-generated island provided by the developers or from the Steam Workshop, or they may generate a new, random island with a variety of options. Once their island has been created, they work through all the ages, receiving small and large tasks alike to help them advance through the ages and build a stable island. Each of the eras are endless, and may be progressed to whenever the player would like, by completing each of the three main tasks that are given at the end of the first three eras.

As leader, players can decide their country's independence and write a full constitution.

== Marketing and release ==
Tropico 5 was made available for pre-purchase on Steam on 17 April 2014.

The game was banned in Thailand by the National Council for Peace and Order. The country's military junta government said that the game's storyline "might affect peace and order in the country". The game's distributor in Thailand, New Era Thailand, explained that "In the fifth installment, the storyline has developed further and there might be some part of it that's not appropriate in the current situation [in Thailand]."

The game was localized and published by Square Enix in Japan for Xbox 360 and PlayStation 4.

The game's Complete Edition, which includes all the released downloadable content and expansion packs (Espionage and Waterborne), was released digitally on 29 January 2016.

The game forumers discovered that the vanilla games have the working models inside the game which are later sold and "unlocked" in the DLC.

== Reception ==
Reception

Aggregate score
Aggregator	Score
Metacritic	PC: 75/100; X360: 71/100; PS4: 76/100; XONE: 75/100

Review scores
Publication	Score
Eurogamer	7/10
Game Informer	8.5/10
GameSpot	8/10
GamesRadar+	4.5/5
IGN	7.2/10
Joystiq	78/100
PC Gamer (US)	78/100
Polygon	6.5/10
GamDB	7/10

According to review aggregator Metacritic, the PC, PlayStation 4, and Xbox One versions of the game received "generally favorable" reviews from critics, while the Xbox 360 version received "mixed or average" reviews.

GamesRadar+ praised many new features of the game, including eras and the constitution, stating "Eras and intermittent world events are the perfect antidote to the jagged pacing of previous entries, and the added layers of Constitutional lawmaking and tech development make for a greater sense of socioeconomic craftsmanship." Hooked Gamers wrote that "Eras add flavour, research brings structure and dynasties give you a reason to come back."

A number of critics noted that Tropico 5 was the most accessible entry in the series yet. Worth Playing considered the game an effective starting point for those new to the series, noting the simplification of systems such as diplomacy. PC Games echoed this sentiment, stating "Experienced players will miss a little depth and challenge, but its forgiving gameplay is especially attractive for newcomers."

Some critics were more mixed on the game, however. Ars Technica criticised the "excess number of quests" and the "lack of motivation and enthusiasm" that the game had. Polygon was generally positive on the gameplay, but considered the satirical tone "childish" and "seemingly unaware of its own internal ironies."
