= Tropico 6 =

2019 video game

- Developer: Limbic Entertainment (Note: Nintendo Switch version ported by Independent Arts Software)
- Publisher: Kalypso Media
- Designers: Andreas Reißner; Knut Arnold; Marcus Cool; Leonard Tetzlaff
- Writers: Chris Bateman; Richard Boon
- Composer: Dynamedion
- Series: Tropico
- Engine: Unreal Engine 4
- Platforms: Microsoft Windows macOS; Linux; SteamOS; PlayStation 4 Xbox One; Nintendo Switch; PlayStation 5 Xbox Series X/S
- Release: Windows, macOS, Linux; March 29, 2019; PlayStation 4, Xbox One; September 27, 2019; Nintendo Switch; November 6, 2020; PlayStation 5, Xbox Series X/S; March 31, 2022
- Genres: Construction and management simulation, government simulation
- Modes: Single-player, multiplayer

Tropico 6 is a construction, management and political simulation game in the Tropico series, developed by Limbic Entertainment, published by Kalypso Media, and announced at E3 2017. Originally intended for a 2018 release, Tropico 6 was released on Microsoft Windows, macOS and Linux in March 2019, and for PlayStation 4 and Xbox One in September 2019. It was released for the Nintendo Switch in November 2020, and on PlayStation 5 and Xbox Series X/S in March 2022.

== Gameplay ==
As in the other games in the series, the player assumes the role of "El Presidente", the leader of the Caribbean island nation of Tropico. Similarly to Tropico 5, there are four eras: The Colonial era, the World Wars era, the Cold War era, and the modern era. Unlike previous games in the series, where Tropico consisted of only one island, Tropico 6 allows players to build on an archipelago of smaller islands, allowing players to build bridges (in the World Wars era and later) from their starting island to the other islands in the chain.

According to senior content designer Johannes Pfeiffer, Tropico 6 has "fully simulated" citizens, where the actions of El Presidente's government towards the citizenry can have an effect on productivity, and possibly even result in a revolt. In addition to customizing their own El Presidente (as either male or female), players can also customize the presidential palace.

== Campaign ==
Unlike previous Tropico Games, 6 does not have an overarching campaign. Rather, the first Mission (where the Presidente manages to secure independence from the Crown and meets his future second-in-command, Penultimo) and the last Mission (where the Player needs to defend Tropico from the various schemes of British Aristocrat Lord Roger Wyndham, eventually culminating in El Presidente managing to destroy Wyndham's Weather control machine and rendering him a non-threat) are the only linear ones, with all other ones implied to take place at some unspecified time (only sometimes recognizing the first mission as canon).

== Reception ==
Reception

Aggregate score
Aggregator	Score
Metacritic	(PC) 78/100 (PS4) 76/100 (XONE) 78/100 (NS) 70/100

Review scores
Publication	Score
GameRevolution	8/10
IGN	7.3/10
Nintendo Life	7/10
Nintendo World Report	8/10
PC Gamer (US)	79/100
PCGamesN	7/10
Push Square	8/10
Shacknews	9/10
TouchArcade	3.5/5

Tropico 6 received "generally positive" reviews for Windows, PlayStation 4, and Xbox One, while the Switch port received "mixed or average" reviews, according to review aggregator Metacritic. It was the fastest-selling game in the franchise, with the revenue it generated being 50% higher than that of Tropico 5's debut.

CGM called Tropico 6 the "strongest entry in the franchise", praising its music, graphics, and writing, while recognizing the presence of minor bugs and jank, ultimately deeming the title a full realization of the series' potential. Shacknews heavily lauded the "incredibly addictive" gameplay, crisp UI, sheer detail, variety of strategic options, and comedy, and expressed minor gripes with the repetitive music and sometimes convoluted main screen.

Push Square called the console port "...one of PlayStation 4's best strategy games, and also one of its most unique...", praising its music, varied objectives, and fun gameplay, citing the lack of clarity in objective design as a "source of frustration". PC Gamer wrote, "If there's a downside to raids, it's that there's no major downside. Foreign powers have traditionally taken a dim view to piracy, but in this, a game that specifically pokes fun at international relations, it just doesn't come up...where the missions excel, however, it's in forcing you to take actions that can upset the delicate balance of economic growth".

GameRevolution criticized the console port's controller support and said that the single-player mission modes "missed the point" and praised the sandbox mode and tone of the game. IGN stated, "The amount there is to do and the depth of its political mechanics make Tropico 6 stand out over its immediate predecessors...But drink too deeply of its perplexing economic systems and you may find yourself feeling a bit queasy." PCGamesN praised the game's tone for being able to politically commentate on the abuse of democracy through its gameplay mechanics while also calling the title "fun but forgettable".

The Switch port of the game opened to marginally less positive reception, with the subpar graphics drawing criticism. Nintendo Life, while reviewing this port, wrote, "Despite some irksome performance problems, occasionally inconsistent pacing and some rather rough visuals, the game is a lot of addictive fun to play and its cheerful ambiance and compelling systems will keep you glued to your handheld".

=== Sales ===
The Nintendo Switch version of Tropico 6 was the twenty-seventh bestselling retail game during its first week of release in Japan, with 4,368 physical copies being sold.

=== Accolades ===
Year	Award	Category	Result	Ref.
2017	Gamescom Awards	Best Booth Award	Nominated	
2017	Gamescom Awards	Best Strategy Game	Nominated	
2019	The Game Awards 2019	Best Strategy Game	Nominated	
2020	New York Game Awards	Tin Pan Alley Award for Best Music in a Game	Nominated	
2020	NAVGTR Awards	Game, Simulation	Nominated	

== Sequel ==
A sequel, Tropico 7, was announced at Gamescom in August 2025 for release in 2026. In August 2026 Kalypso Media set the release date for 28 January 2027.
