= Imperialism (video game) =

1997 video game

- Developer: Frog City Software
- Publisher: Strategic Simulations
- Designers: William Spieth; Ted Spieth
- Platforms: Macintosh, Windows
- Release: NA: September 3, 1997^{GOG} November 20, 2012
- Genre: Turn-based strategy
- Modes: Single-player, multiplayer

Imperialism is a turn-based strategy game for Microsoft Windows and Apple Macintosh computers, developed by Frog City Software and published by Strategic Simulations in 1997. In Imperialism, the player is the ruler of a 19th-century country and aims to become ruler of the world by conquest or by vote. Imperialism was followed by Imperialism II: Age of Exploration.

== Gameplay ==
There are two ways to play Imperialism: in a fictional, randomly generated world, or in a historical scenario. In the first case, the player selects one of seven "great powers" and starts ruling in 1815, a year considered by many historians the beginning of the 19th-century era in the real world. The goal is to be voted world ruler by a two-thirds majority in the "Council of Governors", in which all provincial governors of the world convene once in a decade. Governors in "minor nations" tend to vote for great powers that have favored their country in trade and diplomacy, whereas governors in great powers vote for strong military powers. If no two-thirds majority is ever reached, the game continues until the year 1915, when the power with the largest number of governors behind it wins the game. Although victory is determined by the Council of Governors, the game score is determined by how much a player has built, including the size of a Great Power's military, workforce, transportation network, merchant marine, diplomatic standing and number of provinces controlled.

Empire building can be achieved either through diplomacy or through conquest. In either case, the empire must have a solid economic grounding, which is established by the exploitation of the country's resources (wood, ore, etc.), by industry (for example, turning raw materials iron and coal into steel) and by trade.

In the historical scenarios, the player chooses a European power - available are Great Britain, France, Austria-Hungary, the Ottoman Empire, Russia, and, depending on the period chosen, Prussia and Sardinia, or respectively Germany and Italy. The game starts not in 1815 but either in 1820 (apparently so that France isn't too weak at the start of the game), in 1848, the year of revolutions, or in 1882, at the start of the arms race that eventually led to World War I. The end of the game is still the same, except that in the third scenario (1882) the Council of Governors does not convene until 1915.

Imperialism is entirely turn-based. Each turn, players make their decisions in five screens: the map screen, where "specialists" (prospectors, engineers, etc.) are put to work, and military orders are given; the transport screen, where transport capacity is allocated; the industry screen, where production is determined and workers are trained in various ways; the trade screen, where offers and bids for the next trade session are determined; and the diplomacy screen, where diplomatic decisions are made.

As the game progresses the players will also be given the option to buy Research. Research can allow increased production of some raw materials, or allow for military upgrades, or in some cases render parts of the navy fleet obsolete.

When all the players click the "End turn" button, the orders are processed. Turn-based trade sessions, diplomacy sessions (the acceptance/declining of treaties) and battles follow. Battles too are turn-based, and they can be either fought by the player or left to the game AI. Naval battles are always handled by the AI.

In multiplayer mode, at most 7 players can play together over a network. Games can be played over a LAN or the Internet. Imperialism offers a tutorial mode and five levels of game difficulty. Game editors and mods have also been published to create new scenarios, such as a world map.

=== Economy ===
In Imperialism's economic model, states control production and engage in trade. To produce anything, raw materials are needed. These can be bought on the world market, or gained by exploitation of resources in the player's country. For instance, timber can be obtained by exploiting forests. It can subsequently be transformed into lumber in a lumber mill. Lumber can be used to expand internal transport, to increase factory output, or for producing merchant ships and warships. It can also be processed further into furniture, which is used to recruit new workers, but more commonly is sold on the market to produce revenue. Timber can also be processed into paper, which is used to train workers for higher levels of productivity, and then educate them so that they can serve in more advanced military units. Paper is also necessary to train expert workers as specialists (i.e. prospectors, engineers, miners, ranchers, farmers, foresters and oil drillers).

Often a Great Power will buy raw materials (such as timber) from a Minor Nation and sell the refined goods (furniture) back to the same or another minor nation, generating revenue as well as improving diplomatic relations. From the start of the game, Great Powers compete to be the favored trade partner of resource-rich minor nations, using trade subsidies and various forms of diplomacy.

=== Diplomacy ===
In the Imperialism diplomacy screen, various treaties can be proposed to other countries, and war can be declared on them. Also, trade subsidies may be offered. These increase the prices paid for a country's export goods and decrease the price the other country pays for the player's exports, making trade more profitable for the other country and thus more likely.

The treaties which may be proposed are:

- Non-aggression pact. Only possible between great power and a minor nation. When a minor nation is attacked by another great power (they never attack each other), the minor nations will request help from any power with which it signed a non-aggression pact. If the request is honored, the minor nation joins the great power's empire.
- Alliance. An alliance can only be forged between two great powers. When any of them enters a war, the allies are asked to wage war as well.
- Request to join an empire. Minor nations will voluntarily join the empire of any power that has been sufficiently kind to them in the past (lots of trade, financial grants, a pact).
- Peace treaty.
- Declaration of war. This is the only treaty which may not be refused (although no minor nation will ever refuse a non-aggression pact).

Before a Great Power can reach a trade agreement with a Minor Power, the Great Power must build a Trade Consulate in the Minor Power. Before the Great Power can sign a treaty with a Minor Power, the Great Power must build an Embassy in the Minor Power. The money required to build Trade Consulates and Embassies is significant, especially early in the game, when the player's revenue is limited. All Great Powers automatically possess Embassies with each other at the beginning of the game.

Great Powers can encourage closer relationships with Minor Powers and each other with subsidies and grants of cash.

Building Diplomatic power can be key to winning the game. When a Great Power is in an alliance with another Great Power or has signed a non-aggression pact with a Minor Power, the Great Power is expected to go to war if the other Power is attacked. In the case of two Great Powers that share an alliance, if one Great Power starts a war, the other Great Power is also expected to go to war. If a player decides not to honor an alliance or non-aggression pact, the player's Great Power loses diplomatic standing and may find it harder to negotiate alliances in the future. Negotiating a separate peace instead of waging total war will also break an alliance, with the same effect on a Great Power's diplomatic standing as if the Great Power had refused to go to war in the first place.

== Compatibility ==
Although the program was written for Windows 95, it can be run under other versions of Windows using the Windows Compatibility Wizard and a change of screen resolution to 640 x 480 for complete stability. The GOG.com edition runs under Windows XP, Vista, 7 and 8.

== Development ==
Imperialism underwent several name changes during development, such as Sphere of Influence, Age of Industry and Sid Meier's Industrialization. Since 2004 Ubisoft holds the copyright.

== Reception ==
Reception

Review scores
Publication	Score
Computer Gaming World	4.5/5
PC Gamer (UK)	78%
PC Gamer (US)	87%
Macworld	3.5/5
Computer Games Strategy Plus	4/5

According to former members of Frog City Software at Sidecar Studios, Imperialism's commercial performance was unexpectedly strong. In December 1998, Barry Brenesal of CNET Gamecenter called it a "sleeper hit" and "extremely successful for a turn-based strategy title". At the time, he noted that it was "still selling and has even topped the 100,000 mark." Sidecar's staff noted that Imperialism outsold the "original sales goal more than seven-fold", and reached sales surpassing 300,000 copies by 2007.

Macworld's Michael Gowan wrote, "While it lacks tactical realism, this sim provides strategy buffs some compelling management challenges."
