= Haemimont Games =

Bulgarian video game developer

Haemimont Games AD
- Company type: Subsidiary
- Industry: Video games
- Founded: September 1997; 28 years ago
- Founder: Gabriel Dobrev
- Headquarters: Sofia, Bulgaria
- Key people: Bisser Dyankov (CEO)
- Number of employees: ~60 (2018)
- Parent: Haemimont (2002–2003); Paradox Interactive (2025–)
- Website: haemimontgames.com

Haemimont Games AD (Note: Bulgarian name Хемимонт, meaning Haemimontus) is a Bulgarian video game developer founded by Gabriel Dobrev in September 1997 and based in Sofia. The company primarily focuses on producing simulation, city-building and ancient history strategy games but has developed titles in the role-playing genre as well.

== History ==
Before game development, the company's business was software outsourcing. Haemimont Games, previously part of information technology company Haemimont-Smartcom, became part of Haemimont AD with Haemimont Web Team and Haemimont Emedia in 2002. Ludmil Pandeff, co-founder of Haemimont AD and president of Axa Technologies, Inc, became managing director. In 2003, Haemimont Games became an independent company with Gabriel Dobrev, an earlier employee of Haemimont, as chief executive officer.

In February 2025, Paradox Interactive acquired Haemimont Games.

== Games developed ==
Year	Title	Genre	Platform(s)
2000	Tzar: The Burden of the Crown	Real-time strategy	Microsoft Windows
2002	Celtic Kings: Rage of War	Real-time strategy, role-playing	Microsoft Windows
2004	Nemesis of the Roman Empire	Real-time strategy, role-playing	Microsoft Windows
2005	Imperivm III: The Great Battles of Rome	Real-time strategy, real-time tactics	Microsoft Windows
2005	Rising Kingdoms	City-building, real-time strategy	Microsoft Windows
2006	Glory of the Roman Empire	City-building	Microsoft Windows
2008	Imperium Romanum	City-building, real-time strategy	Microsoft Windows
2008	Imperium Romanum: Emperor Expansion	City-building, real-time strategy	Microsoft Windows
2009	Grand Ages: Rome	City-building, real-time strategy	Microsoft Windows
2009	Tropico 3	City-building, construction and management simulation	Microsoft Windows, Xbox 360
2009	Grand Ages: Rome - Reign of Augustus	City-building, Real-time strategy	Microsoft Windows
2011	The First Templar	Action, role-playing	Microsoft Windows, Xbox 360
2011	Tropico 4	City-building, construction and management simulation	Microsoft Windows, Xbox 360
2013	Omerta – City of Gangsters	Simulation, turn-based strategy	macOS, Microsoft Windows, Xbox 360
2014	Tropico 5	City-building, construction and management simulation	Linux, macOS, Microsoft Windows, PlayStation 4, Xbox 360, Xbox One
2015	Victor Vran	Action role-playing	Linux, macOS, Microsoft Windows, Nintendo Switch, PlayStation 4, Xbox One
2018	Surviving Mars	City-building	Linux, macOS, Microsoft Windows, PlayStation 4, Xbox One
2023	Stranded: Alien Dawn	Survival simulation	Microsoft Windows, PlayStation 4, PlayStation 5, Xbox One, Xbox Series X/S
2023	Jagged Alliance 3	Tactical role-playing	Microsoft Windows, PlayStation 4, PlayStation 5, Xbox One, Xbox Series X/S
2025	Surviving Mars: Relaunched	City-building	Microsoft Windows, PlayStation 5, Xbox Series X/S
