= Limbic Entertainment =

German video game developer

Limbic Entertainment GmbH
- Company type: Private
- Industry: Video games
- Founded: 19 September 2002; 23 years ago
- Founders: Stephan Winter; Eike Radunz; Alexander Frey
- Headquarters: Langen, Germany
- Key people: Lionel Lovisa (managing director)
- Products: Tropico 6
- Number of employees: 110 (2024)
- Parent: Bandai Namco Entertainment Europe (2022-2025)
- Website: limbic-entertainment.de

Limbic Entertainment GmbH is a German video game developer based in Langen and founded in 2002.

== History ==
Limbic Entertainment was founded on 19 September 2002, by Stephan Winter, Eike Radunz and Alexander Frey, who previously worked for Sunflowers. They developed the tenth installment in the Might and Magic video game series, Might & Magic X: Legacy, for Ubisoft. Also for Ubisoft, they developed Might & Magic Heroes VI in collaboration with Black Hole Entertainment and Virtuos. In August 2014, Ubisoft announced that it would produce Might & Magic Heroes VII in cooperation with Limbic Entertainment.

Limbic Entertainment focuses on game design and programming. Other jobs, as for example graphics, are usually outsourced (in case of Might and Magic X: Legacy they collaborated with Ubisoft Chengdu and Liquid Development). The three founders of the company are former employees of Sunflowers Interactive Entertainment Software, a company that published games like Anno 1602, Anno 1503, and Anno 1701. On 11 April 2007, Ubisoft had acquired Sunflowers.

During the development of Might & Magic X: Legacy, the developers wrote a blog post in cooperation with the publisher, where they presented the game and discussed game features. This "OpenDev" phase lasted from August 2013 (release of game Beta containing Act I) until the game's release in January 2014. Two months after Might and Magic X: Legacy release, on 27 March 2014 (together with last patch) the developer announced on game pages end of support for the game.

In October 2016 Ubisoft announced the end of partnership with Limbic.

In June 2017 Kalypso and Limbic announced that they would cooperate on the release of Tropico 6 scheduled for a 2018 release on PC, Linux, MacOS, PS4 and Xbox One. Since then the release date has been pushed to early 2019. As of 2022, the company employs 80 people.

Bandai Namco Holdings acquired a minority stake in Limbic in February 2021 and became majority stakeholder in October 2022.

Winter and Frey plan to step down as the studio managers until the end of 2025, switching into a consulting role while remaining shareholders. Bandai Namco sold off the studio to an undisclosed investor in December 2025.

== Games ==
| Year | Title | Publisher(s) | Platforms |
|---|---|---|---|
| 2011 | Dungeon Empire | Gamigo | Browser game |
| 2011 | Might & Magic Heroes VI | Ubisoft | Microsoft Windows |
| 2014 | Might & Magic X: Legacy | Ubisoft | Microsoft Windows, OS X |
| 2015 | Might & Magic Heroes VII | Ubisoft | Microsoft Windows |
| 2018 | Memories of Mars | 505 Games | Microsoft Windows |
| 2019 | Tropico 6 | Kalypso Media | Microsoft Windows, Linux, MacOS, PlayStation 4, Xbox One |
| 2023 | Park Beyond | Bandai Namco Entertainment | Microsoft Windows, PlayStation 5, Xbox Series X/S |
| 2026 | Corsair Cove | Hooded Horse | Microsoft Windows |

== Official website ==
- Official website
