= Index of Windows games (T) =

This is an index of Microsoft Windows games.

This list has been split into multiple pages. Please use the Table of Contents to browse it.

Title	Released	Developer	Publisher
Tabloid Tycoon	2005	ValuSoft	ValuSoft, Global Software Publishing
Tachyon: The Fringe	2000	NovaLogic	NovaLogic
Tacoma	2017	Fullbright	Fullbright
Tactical Ops: Assault on Terror	1999	Kamehan Studios	Infogrames
Tainted Grail: Conquest	2021	Questline	Awaken Realms
Taito Legends	2005	Taito	Empire Interactive, Sega
Taito Legends 2	2007	Taito	Empire Interactive, Destineer
Take No Prisoners	1997	Raven Software	Red Orb Entertainment
Take On Helicopters	2011	Bohemia Interactive	Bohemia Interactive
Take On Mars	2017	Bohemia Interactive	Bohemia Interactive
Takeda	2001	Magitech	Xicat Interactive, Inc.
A Tale in the Desert	2003	eGenesis	eGenesis
A Tale of Two Kingdoms	2007	Crystal Shard	Crystal Shard
Tales From Off-Peak City Vol. 1	2020	Cosmo D	Cosmo D
Tales from the Borderlands	2014	Telltale Games	Telltale Games
Tales of Monkey Island	2009	Telltale Games	Telltale Games
The Talos Principle 2	2023	Croteam	Devolver Digital
The Talos Principle	2014	Croteam	Devolver Digital
Talvisota: Icy Hell	2007	Blitzfront Game Studio	Nival Interactive, Blitzfront Game Studio
Tank Universal	2008	Dialogue Design	Meridian4
Tarr Chronicles	2007	Quazar Studio	Paradox Interactive, Akella, cdv Software
Tattletail	2016	Waygetter Electronics	Little Flag Software
Tavern Talk	2024	Gentle Troll Entertainment	Gentle Troll Entertainment
Team 47 GoMan	1997	47-TEK	47-TEK
Team Apache	1998	Simis	Mindscape
Team Fortress 2	2007	Valve	Valve
Team Fortress Classic	1999	Valve	Sierra Entertainment
Team Sonic Racing	2019	Sumo Digital	Sega
The Technomancer	2016	Spiders	Focus Home Interactive
Teenage Mutant Ninja Turtles	2003	Konami	Konami
Teenage Mutant Ninja Turtles 2: Battle Nexus	2004	Konami	Konami
Teenage Mutant Ninja Turtles: Mutant Melee	2005	Konami	Konami
Tekken 7	2017	Bandai Namco Studios	Bandai Namco Entertainment
Tekken 8	2024	Bandai Namco Studios	Bandai Namco Entertainment
Telengard	2002	Travis Baldree	
Tell Me Why	2020	Dontnod Entertainment	Xbox Game Studios
Telling Lies	2019	Sam Barlow, Furious Bee	Annapurna Interactive
Tempest 2000	1996	Atari, Llamasoft	Atari
Tempest Rising	2025	Slipgate Ironworks, 2B Games	3D Realms
The Temple of Elemental Evil	2003	Troika Games	Atari
Temüjin	1997	SouthPeak Games	SouthPeak Games
Ten Desires	2011	Team Shanghai Alice	Team Shanghai Alice
Ten Pin Alley	1996	Adrenalin Entertainment	ASC Games
Terminator 3: War of the Machines	2003	Clever's Games	Atari
Terminator Salvation	2009	GRIN	Equity Games
Terminator: Resistance	2019	Teyon	Reef Entertainment
Terminus	2000	Vicarious Visions	Vatical Entertainment LLC
Terracide	1997	Simis	Eidos Interactive
TerraFire	2000	ORT Software	ORT Software
Terraria	2011	Re-Logic	Re-Logic
Terrawars: New York Invasion	2006	Ladyluck Digital Media	Tri Synergy
TD Overdrive: The Brotherhood of Speed	2002	Pitbull Syndicate	Infogrames
Test Drive 4	1996	Pitbull Syndicate	Accolade
Test Drive 5	1998	Pitbull Syndicate	Accolade
Test Drive 6	1999	Pitbull Syndicate	Infogrames North America; Cryo Interactive
Test Drive: Off-Road	1997	Elite Systems	Accolade; Eidos Interactive
Test Drive 4X4	1998	Accolade	Accolade
Test Drive: Off-Road 3	1999	Infogrames North America	Infogrames North America
Test Drive Unlimited	2006	Eden Games	Atari
Test Drive Unlimited 2	2011	Eden Games	Atari
The Testament of Sherlock Holmes	2012	Frogwares	Frogwares, Focus Home Interactive, Atlus USA
TetriNET	1997	St0rmCat	
Tetris Worlds	2001	Radical Entertainment, Blue Planet Software, 3d6 Games	THQ
Tex Murphy: Overseer	1998	Access Software	Access Software
The Texas Chain Saw Massacre	2023	Sumo Digital	Gun Interactive
Tharsis	2016	Choice Provisions	Choice Provisions
Thea: The Awakening	2015	MuHa Games	MuHa Games
Thea 2: The Shattering	2019	MuHa Games	MuHa Games, RockGame
Theatre of War	2006	1C Company	Battlefront.com
theHunter	2009	Avalanche Studios	Emote Games
Theme Hospital	1997	Bullfrog Productions	Electronic Arts
Theme Park Inc	2001	Bullfrog Productions, Climax Group	Electronic Arts
Theme Park World	1999	Bullfrog Productions	Electronic Arts
They Are Billions	2019	Numantian Games	Numantian Games
Thief	2014	Eidos-Montréal	Square Enix
Thief II	2000	Looking Glass Studios	Eidos Interactive
Thief Simulator	2018	Noble Muffins	PlayWay S.A.
Thief: Deadly Shadows	2004	Ion Storm	Eidos Interactive
Thief: The Dark Project	1998	Looking Glass Studios	Eidos Interactive
The Thing	2002	Computer Artworks	Black Label Games, Konami
Things on Wheels	2009	Load Inc.	SouthPeak Games
Thirty Flights of Loving	2012	Blendo Games	Blendo Games
This Land Is My Land	2021	Game-Labs	Game-Labs
Thorgal: Curse of Atlantis	2002	Cryo Interactive Entertainment	Le Lombard
Three Cards to Midnight	2009	Big Finish Games	Big Finish Games
Three Kingdoms: Fate of the Dragon	2001	Overmax Studios	Eidos Interactive
Three Lions	1998	Z-Axis	BMG Interactive
The Three Musketeers	2005	Legendo Entertainment	Legendo Entertainment
Three Sisters' Story	1996	Sakura Soft	JAST USA
Thrillville: Off the Rails	2007	Frontier Developments	LucasArts
Throne of Darkness	2001	Click Entertainment	Sierra Studios
Thronebreaker: The Witcher Tales	2018	CD Projekt Red	CD Projekt
Through the Woods	2016	Antagonist	1C Publishing EU
Thunder Truck Rally	1997	Reflections	Psygnosis
Thymesia	2022	OverBorder Studio	Team17
Tick! Tack!	2005	Navel	Navel
Tiger Woods PGA Tour 2005	2004	EA Sports	EA Games
Tiger Woods PGA Tour 06	2005	EA Sports	EA Games
Tiger Woods PGA Tour 07	2006	EA Sports	EA Games
Tiger Woods PGA Tour 08	2007	EA Tiburon	EA Sports
Time Commando	1996	Adeline Software International	Electronic Arts, Activision
The Time Warp of Dr. Brain	1996	Sierra Entertainment	Sierra Entertainment
Timelapse	1996	GTE Interactive Media	GTE Interactive Media
Timeline	2000	Timeline Computer Entertainment	Eidos Interactive
Times of Conflict	2000	Eugen Systems	Microïds
TimeShift	2007	Saber Interactive	Vivendi Games
Timon & Pumbaa's Jungle Games	1995	7th Level	Disney Interactive
Tintin: Destination Adventure	2001	Destination Software	Infogrames
Tintin in Tibet	1996	Infogrames	Infogrames
Tiny & Big in Grandpa's Leftovers	2012	Black Pants Game Studio	Black Pants Game Studio
Tiny Glade	2024	Pounce Light	Pounce Light
Tiny Tina's Wonderlands	2022	Gearbox Software	2K
Tiny Toon Adventures: Buster and the Beanstalk	1996	Terraglyph Interactive	Terraglyph Interactive
TiQal	2008	Slapdash Games	Microsoft Game Studios
Titan Quest	2006	Iron Lore Entertainment	THQ
Titan Quest: Immortal Throne	2007	Iron Lore Entertainment	THQ
Titanic: Adventure Out of Time	1996	Cyberflix	GTE Entertainment, Europress
TMNT	2007	Ubisoft Montreal	Ubisoft
Toby: The Secret Mine	2015	Lukáš Navrátil	Lukáš Navrátil
TOCA Race Driver 3	2006	Codemasters	Codemasters
ToeJam & Earl: Back in the Groove	2019	HumaNature Studios	Adult Swim Games
Tom Clancy's EndWar	2008	Ubisoft Shanghai	Ubisoft
Tom Clancy's Ghost Recon	2001	Red Storm Entertainment	Ubi Soft
Tom Clancy's Ghost Recon Advanced Warfighter	2006	Ubisoft Paris	Ubisoft
Tom Clancy's Ghost Recon Advanced Warfighter 2	2007	Red Storm Entertainment	Ubisoft
Tom Clancy's Ghost Recon Breakpoint	2019	Ubisoft Paris	Ubisoft
Tom Clancy's Ghost Recon Wildlands	2017	Ubisoft Paris, Ubisoft Milan	Ubisoft
Tom Clancy's Ghost Recon: Future Soldier	2012	Red Storm Entertainment, Ubisoft Paris, Ubisoft Bucharest	Ubisoft
Tom Clancy's Ghost Recon: Island Thunder	2003	Red Storm Entertainment	Ubisoft
Tom Clancy's H.A.W.X	2009	Ubisoft Bucharest	Ubisoft
Tom Clancy's Politika	1997	Red Storm Entertainment	Red Storm Entertainment
Tom Clancy's Rainbow Six	1998	Red Storm Entertainment	Red Storm Entertainment
Tom Clancy's Rainbow Six 3: Raven Shield	2003	Ubisoft Montreal, Red Storm Entertainment	Ubisoft
Tom Clancy's Rainbow Six: Lockdown	2005	Red Storm Entertainment	Ubisoft
Tom Clancy's Rainbow Six: Rogue Spear	1999	Red Storm Entertainment	Red Storm Entertainment
Tom Clancy's Rainbow Six: Take-Down – Missions in Korea	2001	Ubisoft	Kama Digital Entertainment
Tom Clancy's Rainbow Six: Vegas	2006	Ubisoft Montreal	Ubisoft
Tom Clancy's Rainbow Six: Vegas 2	2008	Ubisoft Montreal	Ubisoft
Tom Clancy's ruthless.com	1998	Red Storm Entertainment	Red Storm Entertainment
Tom Clancy's Splinter Cell	2002	Ubisoft Montreal	Ubisoft, Aspyr Media
Tom Clancy's Splinter Cell: Chaos Theory	2005	Ubisoft Montreal, Ubisoft Annecy	Ubisoft
Tom Clancy's Splinter Cell: Conviction	2010	Ubisoft Montreal	Ubisoft
Tom Clancy's Splinter Cell: Double Agent	2006	Ubisoft Shanghai, Ubisoft Montreal, Ubisoft Annecy, Ubisoft Milan	Ubisoft
Tom Clancy's Splinter Cell: Pandora Tomorrow	2004	Ubisoft Shanghai, Ubisoft Annecy, Babaroga	Ubisoft
Tom Clancy's SSN	1996	Clancy Interactive Entertainment	Simon & Schuster Interactive
Tomb Raider	2013	Crystal Dynamics	Square Enix
Tomb Raider II	1997	Core Design	Eidos Interactive
Tomb Raider III	1998	Core Design	Eidos Interactive
Tomb Raider I–III Remastered	2024	Aspyr	Aspyr
Tomb Raider IV–VI Remastered	2025	Aspyr	Aspyr
Tomb Raider: The Angel of Darkness	2003	Core Design	Eidos Interactive
Tomb Raider: Anniversary	2007	Crystal Dynamics	Eidos Interactive
Tomb Raider: Chronicles	2000	Core Design	Eidos Interactive
Tomb Raider: The Last Revelation	1999	Core Design	Eidos Interactive
Tomb Raider: Legend	2006	Crystal Dynamics, Nixxes Software	Eidos Interactive
Tomb Raider: Underworld	2008	Crystal Dynamics	Eidos Interactive
Tonic Trouble	1999	Ubi Soft Montreal	Ubi Soft
Tony Hawk's American Wasteland	2005	Neversoft	Activision, Aspyr
Tony Hawk's Pro Skater 2	2000	Neversoft	Activision
Tony Hawk's Pro Skater 3	2001	Neversoft	Activision
Tony Hawk's Pro Skater 4	2002	Neversoft, Vicarious Visions, Babaroga	Activision
Tony Hawk's Underground 2	2004	Neversoft, Shaba Games	Activision
Tony La Russa Baseball 4	1997	Stormfront Studios	Maxis
Toonstruck	1996	Burst Studios	Virgin Interactive Entertainment
Top Gun	2010	Doublesix	Paramount Digital Entertainment
Top Gun: Combat Zones	2003	Digital Integration	Virgin Interactive
Top Gun: Fire at Will	1996	Spectrum Holobyte	MicroProse
Top Gun: Hornet's Nest	1998	Zipper Interactive	MicroProse
Top Spin	2003	PAM Development	Atari
Top Spin 2	2006	Indie Built	2K Sports
Top Trumps Adventures: Dogs and Dinosaurs	2007	SoGoplay, Ironstone Partners	Ubisoft
Top Trumps Adventures: Horror and Predators	2007	SoGoplay, Ironstone Partners	Ubisoft
Top Trumps: Doctor Who	2008	Ironstone Partners	Eidos Interactive
Torchlight	2009	Runic Games	Runic Games
Torchlight II	2012	Runic Games	Runic Games
Torchlight III	2020	Echtra Games	Perfect World Entertainment
Toren	2015	Swordtales	Versus Evil
Torin's Passage	1995	Sierra On-Line	Sierra On-Line
Torment: Tides of Numenera	2017	InXile Entertainment	Techland Publishing
Tormented Souls	2021	Dual Effect	PQube
Tormentum – Dark Sorrow	2015	OhNoo Studio	OhNoo Studio
Total Annihilation	1997	Cavedog Entertainment	GT Interactive
Total Annihilation: Battle Tactics	1998	Cavedog Entertainment	GT Interactive
Total Annihilation: The Core Contingency	1998	Cavedog Entertainment	GT Interactive
Total Annihilation: Kingdoms	1999	Cavedog Entertainment	Cavedog Entertainment
Total Immersion Racing	2002	Razorworks	Empire Interactive
Total Overdose	2005	Deadline Games	Sci Entertainment, Eidos
Total War Battles: Shogun	2012	Creative Assembly	Sega
Total War Saga: Thrones of Britannia	2018	Creative Assembly	Sega
Total War Saga: Troy	2020	Creative Assembly Sofia	Sega
Total War: Attila	2015	Creative Assembly	Sega
Total War: Pharaoh	2023	Creative Assembly Sofia	Sega
Total War: Rome II	2013	Creative Assembly	Sega
Total War: Shogun 2	2011	Creative Assembly	Sega
Total War: Shogun 2: Fall of the Samurai	2012	Creative Assembly	Sega
Total War: Three Kingdoms	2019	Creative Assembly	Sega
The Totally Techie World of Young Dilbert	1997	KnowWonder	
Touhou Hisoutensoku	2009	Twilight Frontier, Team Shanghai Alice	Twilight Frontier, Team Shanghai Alice
Tower of Guns	2014	Terrible Posture Games	Terrible Posture Games
The Town of Light	2016	LKA	Wired Productions
Townscaper	2021	Oskar Stålberg	Oskar Stålberg
Toxic Bunny	1996	Celestial Games	Vision Software
Toy Golf	2005	Ninai Games	Zoo Digital Publishing
Toy Soldiers	2012	Signal Studios	Xbox Game Studios
Toy Soldiers: Cold War	2012	Signal Studios	Microsoft Studios
Toy Soldiers: War Chest	2015	Signal Studios	Ubisoft
Toy Story	1996	Traveller's Tales	Disney Interactive
Toy Story 2: Buzz Lightyear to the Rescue	1999	Traveller's Tales	Activision
Toy Story 3	2010	Avalanche Software	Disney Interactive Studios
Travelrama USA	1994	Zenda Studio	
TrackMania	2003	Nadeo	Digital Jesters, Focus, Enlight, Buka, Valve
TrackMania Sunrise	2005	Nadeo	Digital Jesters, Focus Home Interactive, Enlight
Trade Empires	2001	Frog City Software	Take-Two Interactive
Traffic Giant	2001	JoWooD Productions	JoWooD Productions, Macmillan Software
Trailer Park Tycoon	2002	Jaleco Entertainment	Jaleco Entertainment
Trainz	2001	Auran	Strategy First
Traitors Gate	1999	Daydream Software	DreamCatcher Interactive
Traitors Gate 2: Cypher	2003	258 Productions, Data Ductus	The Adventure Company
tranquility	2001	William A. Romanowski	TQworld, LLC.
Transference	2018	SpectreVision, Ubisoft Montreal	Ubisoft
Transformers: Revenge of the Fallen	2009	Beenox Studios	Activision
Transformers: The Game	2007	Traveller's Tales	Activision
Transformice	2010	Atelier 801	Atelier 801
Trash	2005	Inhuman Games	Inhuman Games
Tread Marks	2000	Longbow Digital Arts	Longbow Digital Arts
Treasure Cove!	1997	The Learning Company	The Learning Company
Treasure Planet: Battle at Procyon	2002	Barking Dog Studios	Disney Interactive
Treasure Quest	1996	Sirius Entertainment	Sirius Publishing
Trek to Yomi	2022	Flying Wild Hog	Devolver Digital
Tremulous	2006	Dark Legion Development	
Trepang2	2023	Trepang Studios	Team17
Tres Lunas	2002	Mike Oldfield	
Trials 2: Second Edition	2008	RedLynx	RedLynx
Trials Rising	2019	RedLynx, Ubisoft Kyiv	Ubisoft
Tribes: Ascend	2012	Hi-Rez Studios	Hi-Rez Studios
Tribes: Vengeance	2004	Irrational Games	Sierra Entertainment
Tribes 2	2001	Dynamix	Sierra On-Line
TrickStyle	1999	Criterion Games	Acclaim Entertainment
Triple Play 2000	1999	Treyarch	Electronic Arts
Triple Play 97	1996	Electronic Arts Canada	Electronic Arts
Triple Play 99	1998	EA Sports	EA Sports
Tristia of the Deep-Blue Sea	2002	Kogado Studio, Kuma-san Team	Kogado Studio
Trivial Pursuit: Unhinged	2004	Artech Studios	Atari
Tron 2.0	2003	Monolith Productions	Buena Vista Interactive
Tropico	2001	PopTop Software	Gathering of Developers
Tropico 2: Pirate Cove	2003	Frog City Software	Gathering of Developers, Take-Two Interactive
Tropico 3	2009	Haemimont Games	Kalypso Media
Tropico 4	2011	Haemimont Games	Kalypso Media
Tropico 5	2014	Haemimont Games	Kalypso Media
Tropico 6	2019	Limbic Entertainment	Kalypso Media
Trouble Witches	2007	Rocket-Engine	Rocket-Engine
Truck-kun is Supporting Me from Another World?!	2026	Strange Scaffold	Frosty Pop Games
True Crime: New York City	2005	Luxoflux	Activision
True Crime: Streets of LA	2003	Luxoflux	Activision
The Truth About 9th Company	2008	Extreme Developers, Kranx Productions	1C Company
Tumblebugs	2005	Wildfire Studios	RealArcade,
Turf Battles	2009	IMAZIC	IMAZIC, Aeria Games and Entertainment
The Turing Test	2016	Bulkhead Interactive	Square Enix Collective
Turning Point: Fall of Liberty	2008	Spark Unlimited	Codemasters
Turok: Dinosaur Hunter	1997	Iguana Entertainment	Acclaim Entertainment
Turok 2: Seeds of Evil	1998	Iguana Entertainment	Acclaim Entertainment
Turok: Evolution	2003	Super Happy Fun Fun	Acclaim Entertainment
Turok	2008	Propaganda Games	Disney Interactive Studios
Tux Racer	2000	Jasmin Patry	Sunspire Studios
Twelve Minutes	2021	Luís António	Annapurna Interactive
Twelve Sky	2007	Alt1	Alt1, Aeria Games and Entertainment
Twin Mirror	2020	Dontnod Entertainment, Shibuya Productions	Dontnod Entertainment
Twisted Metal	1996	Sony Interactive Studios America, SingleTrac	Sony Music Entertainment Japan
Twisted Metal 2	1996	Sony Interactive Studios America, SingleTrac	Sony Interactive Studios America
Two Thrones	2004	Paradox Entertainment	Strategy First
Two Worlds	2007	Reality Pump	Zuxxez Entertainment, SouthPeak Games
Two Worlds II	2010	Reality Pump	TopWare Interactive
Tycoon City: New York	2006	Deep Red Games	Atari
