= List of PC games (T) =

The following page is an alphabetical section from the list of PC games.

== T ==
Name	Developer	Publisher	Genre(s)	Operating system(s)	Date released
Tanarus	Verant Interactive	Sony Interactive Studios America	First-person shooter	Microsoft Windows	12 December 1997
Teardown	Tuxedo Labs	Tuxedo Labs	Sandbox, action	Microsoft Windows	21 April 2022
Team Fortress 2	Valve	Valve	First-person shooter	Microsoft Windows, Linux, macOS	9 October 2007
Team Fortress Classic	Valve	Valve	First-person shooter	Microsoft Windows, Linux, macOS	7 April 1999
Team Sonic Racing	Sumo Digital	Sega	Kart racing game	Microsoft Windows	21 May 2019
Tell Me Why	Dontnod Entertainment	Xbox Game Studios	Adventure	Microsoft Windows	27 August 2020
Telling Lies	Sam Barlow	Annapurna Interactive	Full-motion video	Microsoft Windows, macOS	23 August 2019
Terraria	Re-Logic	Re-Logic, 505 Games, Spike Chunsoft	Action-adventure, survival	Microsoft Windows	16 May 2011
Tetris Effect	Enhance Games	Enhance Games	Puzzle	Microsoft Windows	23 July 2019
There Is No Game: Wrong Dimension	Draw Me A Pixel	Draw Me A Pixel	Adventure, comedy, puzzle	Microsoft Windows, macOS	6 August 2020
The Adventures of Fatman	SOCKO! Entertainment	SOCKO! Entertainment	Point-and-click adventure	Microsoft Windows	May 2003
The Adventures of Lomax	Psygnosis	Psygnosis	2D platformer	Microsoft Windows	22 October 1996
The Big Three	SDJ Enterprises		Strategic-level wargame	MS-DOS	1989
The Binding of Isaac: Rebirth	Edmund McMillen	Nickels Inc	Roguelike	Microsoft Windows	14 November 2014
The King of Fighters XV	SNK	SNK	Fighting	Microsoft Windows	17 February 2022
The Lord of the Rings Online	Turbine, Inc.	Turbine, Inc.	MMORPG	Microsoft Windows, macOS	27 April 2007
The Matrix Online	Monolith Productions	Sega, Warner Bros. Interactive Entertainment	Massively multiplayer online role-playing game	Microsoft Windows	22 March 2005
The Punisher (2005 video game)	Volition	THQ	Action, third-person shooter	Microsoft Windows	12 April 2004
Thief: The Dark Project	Looking Glass Studios	Eidos Interactive	Stealth	Microsoft Windows	30 November 1998
Thief II: The Metal Age	Looking Glass Studios	Eidos Interactive	Stealth	Microsoft Windows	23 March 2000
Thief: Deadly Shadows	Ion Storm	Eidos Interactive	Stealth	Microsoft Windows	25 May 2004
Thief Simulator	PlayWay S.A., FreeMind S.C.	PlayWay S.A.	Simulation, stealth	Microsoft Windows	9 November 2018
Thief	Eidos Montréal	Square Enix	Stealth	Microsoft Windows	25 February 2014
Thomas Was Alone	Mike Bithell	Mike Bithell	Puzzle-platformer	Microsoft Windows, Linux, OS X	30 June 2012
Timelie	Urnique Studio	Urnique Studio	Puzzle, stealth, adventure	Microsoft Windows, macOS	20 May 2020
Titan Quest	Iron Lore Entertainment	THQ	RPG	Microsoft Windows	26 June 2006
Titanfall	Respawn Entertainment	Electronic Arts	First-person shooter	Microsoft Windows	11 March 2014
Titanfall 2	Respawn Entertainment	Electronic Arts	First-person shooter	Microsoft Windows	28 October 2016
Tom Clancy's Rainbow Six Siege	Ubisoft	Ubisoft	First-person shooter	Microsoft Windows	1 December 2015
Tom Clancy's Splinter Cell	Ubisoft Montreal, Ubisoft Shanghai, Gameloft	Ubisoft, Gameloft, Aspyr Media	Stealth	Microsoft Windows, macOS	17 November 2002
Tom Clancy's Splinter Cell: Pandora Tomorrow	Ubisoft Shanghai, Ubisoft Milan, Ubisoft Annecy, Gameloft	Ubisoft	Stealth	Microsoft Windows	23 March 2004
Tom Clancy's Splinter Cell: Chaos Theory	Gameloft, Ubisoft Montreal	Gameloft, Ubisoft	Stealth	Microsoft Windows	21 March 2005
Tom Clancy's Splinter Cell: Double Agent	Ubisoft Shanghai, Ubisoft Montreal, Ubisoft Milan	Ubisoft	Stealth	Microsoft Windows	17 October 2006
Tom Clancy's Splinter Cell: Conviction	Ubisoft Montreal, Gameloft	Ubisoft, Gameloft	Action-adventure, stealth	Microsoft Windows, macOS	13 April 2010
Tom Clancy's Splinter Cell: Blacklist	Ubisoft Toronto, Ubisoft Montreal, Ubisoft Shanghai	Ubisoft	Action-adventure, stealth	Microsoft Windows	20 August 2013
Tomb Raider	Core Design	Eidos Interactive	Action-adventure	MS-DOS	14 November 1996
Tomb Raider II	Core Design	Eidos Interactive	Action-adventure	Microsoft Windows, macOS	24 November 1997
Tomb Raider III	Core Design	Eidos Interactive	Action-adventure	Microsoft Windows, macOS	20 November 1998
Tomb Raider: The Last Revelation	Core Design	Eidos Interactive	Action-adventure	Microsoft Windows, macOS	24 November 1999
Tomb Raider: Chronicles	Core Design	Eidos Interactive	Action-adventure	Microsoft Windows, macOS	24 November 2000
Tomb Raider: The Angel of Darkness	Core Design	Eidos Interactive	Action-adventure	Microsoft Windows, macOS	30 June 2003
Tomb Raider: Legend	Crystal Dynamics	Eidos Interactive	Action-adventure	Microsoft Windows	7 April 2006
Tomb Raider: Anniversary	Crystal Dynamics	Eidos Interactive	Action-adventure	Microsoft Windows, macOS	1 June 2007
Tomb Raider: Underworld	Crystal Dynamics	Eidos Interactive	Action-adventure	Microsoft Windows	18 November 2008
Tomb Raider (2013)	Crystal Dynamics	Square Enix	Action-adventure	Microsoft Windows, macOS	5 March 2013
Tools Up!	The Knights of Unity	All in! Games	Party, co-op	Microsoft Windows	3 December 2019
Top Spin 2	Aspyr	WW: 2K; EU: Aspyr	Sports	Microsoft Windows	1 December 2006
TopSpin 2K25	Hangar 13	2K	Sports	Microsoft Windows	26 April 2024
Torchlight	Runic Games	Runic Games	Action RPG, hack and slash	Microsoft Windows, Linux, macOS	27 October 2009
Torchlight II	Runic Games	Runic Games	Action RPG, hack and slash	Microsoft Windows, Linux, macOS	20 September 2012
Total Annihilation	Cavedog Entertainment	GT Interactive	RTS	Microsoft Windows, macOS	30 September 1997
Totally Accurate Battle Simulator	Landfall Games	Landfall Games	Strategy, sandbox	Microsoft Windows, macOS	1 April 2021
Totally Accurate Battlegrounds	Landfall Games	Landfall Games	Battle royale, third-person shooter	Microsoft Windows	12 June 2018
Total War: Rome II	The Creative Assembly	Sega	RTS	Microsoft Windows, macOS	3 September 2013
Total War: Shogun 2	The Creative Assembly	Sega	RTS	Microsoft Windows, macOS	15 April 2011
Total War: Warhammer	Creative Assembly	Sega	Turn-based strategy; Real-time tactics	Microsoft Windows, macOS, Linux	24 May 2016
Total War: Warhammer II	Creative Assembly	Sega	Turn-based strategy; Real-time tactics	Microsoft Windows, macOS, Linux	28 September 2017
Total War: Warhammer III	Creative Assembly	Sega	Turn-based strategy; Real-time tactics	Microsoft Windows, macOS, Linux	17 February 2022
Tower Unite	PixelTail Games	PixelTail Games	Party, sandbox, MMO	Microsoft Windows	19 April 2025
Townscaper	Oskar Stålberg	Oskar Stålberg	City-building, sandbox	Microsoft Windows, macOS	29 June 2021
Toybox Turbos	Codemasters	Codemasters	Racing, arcade	Microsoft Windows	11 November 2014
TrackMania Nations ESWC	Nadeo	Deep Silver, Enlight, Focus Home Interactive, Digital Jesters	Racing	Microsoft Windows	28 January 2006
TrackMania Sunrise	Nadeo	Digital Jesters, Enlight	Racing	Microsoft Windows	April 2005
TrackMania United	Nadeo	Deep Silver, Enlight, Buka, QV Software, Valve	Racing	Microsoft Windows	17 November 2006
TrackMania Forever	Nadeo	Deep Silver, Enlight, Focus Home Interactive, Digital Jesters	Racing	Microsoft Windows	15 April 2008
TrackMania Nations Forever	Nadeo	Focus Home Interactive, Valve	Racing	Microsoft Windows	16 April 2008
TrackMania 2: Canyon	Nadeo	Ubisoft	Racing	Microsoft Windows	14 September 2011
Trackmania	Nadeo	Ubisoft	Racing	Microsoft Windows	1 July 2020
Train Simulator	Dovetail Games	Dovetail Games	Simulation	Microsoft Windows	2009
Transformice	Atelier 801	Atelier 801	Massively multiplayer online, Platform	Microsoft Windows	2010
Transistor	Supergiant Games	Supergiant Games	Action RPG	Microsoft Windows, Linux, macOS	20 May 2014
Transport Tycoon	Chris Sawyer Productions	MicroProse	Business simulation game	MS-DOS, Mac	15 June 1994
Trespasser	DreamWorks Interactive	Electronic Arts	Action-adventure, first-person shooter	Microsoft Windows	28 October 1998
Tribes 2	Dynamix	Sierra	First-person shooter	Microsoft Windows, Linux	30 March 2001
Tribes: Ascend	Hi-Rez Studios	Hi-Rez Studios	First-person shooter	Microsoft Windows	12 April 2012
Tribes: Vengeance	Irrational Games	VU Games	First-person shooter	Microsoft Windows	5 October 2004
TRON: Evolution	Propaganda Games	Disney Interactive Studios	Action-Adventure	Microsoft Windows	25 November 2010
Tropico	PopTop Software, Feral Interactive	Gathering of Developers, MacSoft, Feral Interactive	Construction and management simulation	Microsoft Windows, macOS	24 April 2001
Tropico 2: Pirate Cove	Frog City Software	Gathering of Developers, Take-Two Interactive	Construction and management simulation	Microsoft Windows, macOS	28 April 2003
Tropico 3	Haemimont Games	Kalypso Media	Construction and management simulation, City-building game	Microsoft Windows, macOS	20 October 2009
Tropico 4	Haemimont Games	Kalypso Media	Construction and management simulation, City-building game	Microsoft Windows, macOS	26 August 2011
Tropico 5	Haemimont Games	Kalypso Media	Construction and management simulation, City-building game	Microsoft Windows, macOS	23 May 2014
Tropico 6	Limbic Entertainment	Kalypso Media	Construction and management simulation, City-building game	Microsoft Windows, macOS	29 March 2019
True Love	Software House Parsley	CD Bros., Otaku Publishing	Visual novel	MS-DOS, Microsoft Windows	9 July 1995
Turbo Dismount	Secret Exit Ltd.	Secret Exit Ltd.	Physics, sandbox	Microsoft Windows, macOS	10 April 2014
Turnip Boy Commits Tax Evasion	Snoozy Kazoo	Graffiti Games	Action-adventure, Indie	Microsoft Windows	22 April 2021
Turnip Boy Robs a Bank	Snoozy Kazoo	Graffiti Games	Action, roguelite	Microsoft Windows	22 February 2024
Two Point Campus	Two Point Studios	Sega	Business simulation	Microsoft Windows, macOS, Linux	9 August 2022
Two Point Hospital	Two Point Studios	Sega	Business simulation	Microsoft Windows, macOS, Linux	30 August 2018
Two Point Museum	Two Point Studios	Sega	Business simulation	Microsoft Windows, macOS, Linux	4 March 2025
Two Worlds	Reality Pump Studios	Zuxxez Entertainment, SouthPeak Interactive	Action RPG, open world	Microsoft Windows	10 July 2007
Two Worlds II	Reality Pump Studios	Topware Interactive	Action RPG, open world	Microsoft Windows, Linux, macOS	9 November 2010
Tzar	Haemimont Games	Take-Two Interactive, FX Interactive	Real-time strategy	Microsoft Windows	31 March 2000
