= Through the Woods =

2016 video game

- Developer: Antagonist
- Publisher: 1C Publishing EU
- Director: Stian Willums
- Writers: Dan Wakefield, Stian Willums and Torstein Vien
- Composer: Dan Wakefield
- Engine: Unity
- Platform: Microsoft Windows
- Release: 27 October 2016
- Genre: Horror
- Mode: Single-player

Through the Woods is a third-person Norwegian horror adventure video game developed by the indie studio Antagonist and published by 1C Publishing EU. On 27 October 2016, the game was released for Microsoft Windows on Steam and GOG.com.

== Plot ==
In the western shore of Norway, a widowed woman named Karen lives in a cabin in the woods with her son Espen. Somewhat estranged from each other, Karen does not actively engage with Espen's various activities, and rather works on her own projects and take naps in the majority of the day because she is working late.

Despite Karen's warnings, Espen walks to an old rickety pier and suddenly disappears. Karen runs after and discovers that a mysterious old man who calls himself Old Erik, an old Norwegian name for the devil, has kidnapped Espen. She swims after his old boat to a mysterious island where she sees that, oddly, the moon has been shattered. Karen is confronted and hunted by various dangerous creatures and monsters such as trolls, Hulder, and mythological talking wolves from Norse mythology and Norwegian folk tales. She sees old ruined villages where the people have mostly vanished or dead and the very few humans she meets have either been driven insane by grief and trauma, or commit suicide in front of her.

Eventually it is revealed that Karen has entered a forgotten time that had stopped after "The Great War" or Ragnarök. The great warrior Vidar was supposed to kill and destroy the World Eater known as Fenris, thus stopping their world being destroyed. However, Vidar was too injured to deliver the killing blow. Vidar and Fenris instead make a pact: Leave Hodimir's holt, the last remaining place, alone and they will do anything.

Fenris agrees on the condition that he gets a child sacrificed to him an every odd number of years.

In the end, the island is empty of children due to its monstrous dangers, as well as diseases and starvation, thus pushing the people to insanity and trauma after the aftermath of The War. The islander called "Old Erik", who reluctantly took the role to take the children to the giant maws of Fenris, learns that there is a way to travel across worlds and entered into our world. However his actions were discovered by Fenris, who demanded more children more often or he would wake up and eat the rest of the world. Now that he knows about the world Karen and Espen came from, he wishes to eat that one too.

It is also revealed that Karen accidentally hurt Espen repeatedly, causing her husband to file in for a divorce and full custody of Espen, but Karen warped the truth to keep her child, causing the blame for abuse to fall on her husband. After the trial was done, her husband committed suicide, causing Karen to feel great shame.

Finally, after several close calls, Karen finally catches up with Espen and Old Erik near the mountainous jaws of Fenris. However Espen has already accepted that he needs to be sacrificed in order to delay the unavoidable, despite Karen's cries of protest pleading to him to come back to her. They try to catch him, but is too late as both Old Erik and Karen fall down into the watery grave of Fenris' jaws.

They all return to the new world. Old Erik has died, and Karen tries to perform CPR on Espen but it is too late. Karen knows that Espen's sacrifice only delayed the full apocalypse by a few years, and that Fenris will require more children eventually. To honor her son's sacrifice, Karen has to pick up the mantle of Old Erik because the instant the pact is broken, every child sacrificed will have been for nothing, and she will not let that happen.

== Gameplay ==
The game features realistic lighting and sounds that plays tricks on, and deceives the player. As the player explores the woods they will find many hidden caves and passageways containing secrets about the island where the game takes place. The main character is only equipped with a flashlight and will need this and sneaking skills to get past the creatures inhabiting the island.

== Development ==
The game was developed by the Norwegian studio Antagonist and started out as a student project. Antagonist began full production in July 2014. It won the "Sound of the Year" award at the Norwegian GAME Awards, 19 February 2015. A Kickstarter ran from 14 May 2015 - 14 June 2015 with the goal of $40,000. They exceeded their goal with $43,833 from 1,272 backers. The game was greenlit by the Steam Community. The development team consists of Dan Wakefield (game designer, composer, sound designer and writer), Stian Willums (art director and character artist), Torje Dreng Andersen (environment artist), Torstein Vien (programmer) and Eirik R. A. Hanssen (programmer). It was released in May 2018 for PS4 & Xbox One .

== See also ==
- 2016 in video gaming
- Index of Windows games (T)
- List of PC games (T)
- List of years in video games
