= Treasure Quest =

Treasure Quest may refer to:

- Treasure Quest (game), 1996 computer puzzle game
- Treasure Quest: Snake Island, American reality television series
- Treasure Quest (TV series), treasure hunting documentary on the Discovery Channel
