= MovieCD =

Digital video storage format

- Box, inside and outside, to MovieCD edition of The Rutles: All You Need Is Cash
- Encoding: NTSC, PAL
- Usage: Home video
- Released: 15 November 1996

MovieCD is a format for digital video storage and consumer home video playback released in 1996 by Sirius Publishing, and was rendered obsolete by the wider distribution of DVD. It used a video codec called MotionPixels, marketed by MotionPixels, Inc., a subsidiary of Sirius Publishing (founded by Darrel Smith and Richard Gnant). It was used in many third-party video games from the mid to late-1990s, and during the same time on Sirius's MovieCDs that it had been originally developed for, enjoying an international distribution in both forms.

Both MovieCDs and the MotionPixels codec remain an issue today in that medium market availability of MovieCDs remained until around the year 2000 and some of the above-mentioned video games still have a cult following, both producing malfunctions in modern PCs due to the outdated MotionPixels codec.

== Origins and development ==
The MotionPixels (MP) codec used on MovieCDs originated with the Huygen codec developed by Christian Huygen, David Whipple, and Darrell Smith.

== Specifications and system requirements ==
Unaltered still taken from MovieCD edition of The Rutles: All You Need is Cash.

The MP codec offered a resolution of 320x236 pixels, 16-bit high color, and 16 frames per second fullscreen playback at a datarate of (in theory) up to about 520 kB/sec, without having to install MPEG or acquire additional hardware, on Microsoft Windows systems from Windows 3.x on. Audio was saved in plain WAV format. Its FourCC code was, depending on version, "MVI1" or "MVI2."

For viewing MovieCDs, Sirius recommended a 486 processor or higher, at least 8 MB of RAM, and a 2x-speed CD-ROM drive (most MovieCDs had a data rate of about 280-300 kB/sec). MovieCDs had a running time of about 45 minutes each, so feature films often were stored on two or three discs in one box, and the consumer had to swap discs to watch the whole movie.

The codec avoided digital compression artifacts such as the pixelization or block artifacts (seen in VCDs using MPEG-1) by treating areas of the frame as objects rather than dividing it into blocks. Its output was always RGB; however, the viewer could choose between different settings of chroma subsampling for encoding, from RGB through YCrCb 4:2:2 all the way to 16:1:1 which ensured for low datarates at what were high resolutions at the time, while a particularly low chroma subsampling made for a distinctively analogue video look to today's eyes, with spatially (not temporally) smeared colors and sharp luma.

=== MVI1 ===
MVI1 was a purely DOS-based codec, carrying its animations in an .MVI container. Apparently, the only occasion it was ever used was with Sirius's game Treasure Quest.

=== MVI2 ===
MVI2 was the Windows incarnation of the MotionPixels codec, and always came with its own player, the MotionPixels Movie Player. MVI2 files used the AVI container still popular today. It saw international distribution during the mid- to late-1990s in the form of Sirius's MovieCDs and many third-party video games (such as the Caesar series by Sierra). MVI2 came in three versions:

- aware31.exe: Aware31 was developed for Windows 3.1x.
- aware95.exe: Aware95 was developed for Windows 95.
- awarent.exe: AwareNT was developed for Windows NT and released in 1998.

== Economic viability ==
Given the dominance of the VCD and DVD formats, MovieCD never gained a significant following.

== Compatibility and issues with modern PCs ==
=== Compatibility ===
All MovieCDs had the MVI2 codec on them ready to install, and most video games with them installed both codec and player without asking the user. Both are still an issue today due to the wide availability of MovieCDs until around 2000 and the cult following some of these games still have. Both versions of the MP codec installing executable for Windows remain available on the web from third-party downloading sites for free manually as well as within codec packs.

The codec's Windows 3.x and 95 version still runs more or less on Windows 98; however the videos often crash as this version of the codec was still a pre-DirectX artifact, even though they can even be played with any other video players on Windows 95 and Windows 98 once the MP codec is installed.

On Windows NT, Windows 2000, and Windows XP, MP's NT version awarent.exe is needed. MP videos run stable on these Windows versions, and the codec can even be used to encode own videos into MotionPixels files, however serious other issues arise no matter which version of MVI2 is installed.

=== Issues ===
As soon as any version of the MotionPixels codec Windows version MVI2 is installed on any post-Win98 Windows OS, any video and audio-editing software on the same system may crash as soon as a codec-choosing dialogue for saving a file is opened. Additionally, players might be unable to read a variety of other audio and video codecs, and a variety of other both software and hardware-related video problems might occur, such as TV-cards ceasing to function.

Running MotionPixels's uninstall routine that only removes the MotionPixels Player, not the codec itself, and not even Windows Control Panel can be used to de-install the MP codec, so the only way to get rid of it and reclaim a working system is to manually delete any single file containing the letters MVI in the Windows registry and the \WINDOWS\SYSTEM32 directory.

== MovieCD catalogue ==
The catalogue of both TV and feature film programs available on MovieCDs mostly spawned from deals with New Line Home Video, Anchor Bay, Alliance, Trimark, Rhino, and Central Park Media, with a total of over 131 titles released, offering genres such as action, comedy, anime, computer animation and music performance.

=== List of titles ===
- 1997 Playboy Playmate Video Calendar
- 1998 Playboy Playmate Video Calendar
- Adult StreetSmart
- The Adventures of Mole
- The Adventures of Toad
- Alien Autopsy: Fact or Fiction
- Arcade
- The Art of Landscape
- The Art of Nature
- Beach Babes from Beyond
- Best of Playboy's Strip Search
- Best of SNL: 15th Anniversary Special
- Best of SNL: The Best of Dan Aykroyd
- Best of SNL: The Best of Gilda Radner
- Best of SNL: The Best of John Belushi
- Best of SNL: Classic Years, Volume 1
- Best of SNL: Classic Years, Volume 2
- Best of SNL: Hosted by Eddie Murphy
- Best of SNL: SNL Goes Commercial
- Betty Boop Cartoons
- Beyond the Mind's Eye
- BullySmart
- Burns and Allen
- Cabbage Patch Kids: The Clubhouse
- Cabbage Patch Kids: The New Kid
- Cabbage Patch Kids: The Screen Test
- Cartoon Festival
- Cher, Extravaganza: Live at the Mirage
- Chronos
- Class of Nuke 'Em High
- Classic Cartoons
- The Clones of Bruce Lee
- Comedy Capers
- Comedy Greats
- Comic Relief VII
- Computer Animation Festival, Volume 1
- Computer Animation Festival, Volume 2
- Cyber City Oedo 808: Data One
- Dominion: Tank Police - Part 1
- Dominion Tank Police - Part 2
- Don Juan DeMarco
- Dr. Katz, Volume 1
- Dr. Katz, Volume 2
- Dragon Fist
- Dumb & Dumber
- Emma
- Elvis in Hollywood
- Friday
- The Gate to the Mind's Eye
- Genocyber, Part 1: Birth of Genocyber
- Ghost in the Shell
- The Grateful Dead, Dead Ahead
- The Grateful Dead, Ticket to New Year's
- Jenny McCarthy: The Playboy Years
- Jimi Hendrix, Jimi Plays Monterey
- Jimi Hendrix, Rainbow Bridge
- House Party
- Imaginaria
- Imaginit
- Jason Goes to Hell: The Final Friday
- The Kids in the Hall
- The Lawnmower Man
- The Lawnmower Man 2: Jobe's War
- Leprechaun
- Leprechaun 2
- The Little Shop of Horrors
- The Louvre
- Macross Plus, Part 1
- Macross Plus, Part 2
- Macross Plus, Part 3
- Macross Plus, Part 4
- Barry Manilow, The Greatest Hits
- The Mask
- Menace II Society
- Military Aircraft Video Report - Volume III, Number 1
- The Mind's Eye
- Mole's Christmas
- The Monkees, Volume 1
- The Monkees, Volume 2
- Monterey Pop
- Mortal Kombat
- Mumfie: The Movie
- Mumfie's White Christmas
- New Dominion Tank Police - Part 1
- New Dominion Tank Police - Part 2
- Night of the Living Dead
- A Nightmare on Elm Street 4: The Dream Master
- Ninja Scroll
- One Step Beyond
- Patrick Stewart Narrates "The Planets"
- Playboy Video Centrefold: Pamela Anderson
- Playboy 21 Playmates Centerfold Collection Volume 1
- Playboy's Biker Babes: Hot Wheels & High Heels
- Playboy's Cheerleaders
- Playboy's College Girls
- Playboy's Girls in Uniform
- Playboy's Girls of the Internet
- Playboy's Sorority Girls
- Playboy's Voluptuous Vixens
- Playboy's Wet & Wild VIII: Bottoms Up
- The Player
- The Poetry Hall of Fame, Volume 1
- The Poetry Hall, Volume 2
- Poison Ivy
- Politically Incorrect: The Political Domain
- Power Moves
- The Princess Bride
- Pump Up the Volume
- Puppet Master
- Quadrophenia
- Reefer Madness
- Return of the Living Dead 3
- Roswell: Cover Ups & Close Encounters
- Rowan Atkinson Live
- The Rutles: All You Need is Cash
- The Secret Adventures of Tom Thumb
- Seven
- Slam Dunk Ernest
- Sex Madness
- StrangerSmart
- Subspecies
- Surf Nazis Must Die
- Teenage Mutant Ninja Turtles
- Time Capsule World War II: Europe/Pacific
- Trancers III
- The Toxic Avenger
- Tromeo & Juliet
- Urotsukidoji III: Return of the Overfiend - Episode 1
- Urotsukidoji III: Return of the Overfiend - Episode 2
- Urotsukidoji III: Return of the Overfiend - Episode 3
- Urotsukidoji III: Return of the Overfiend - Episode 4
- VH1: Guitar Legends
- VH1: Psychedelic High
- VH1: Rock in the U.K.
- Warlock
- Warlock: The Armageddon
- Wes Craven's New Nightmare
- The Who, The Kids Are Alright
- Whore
- Wind in the Willows: The Adventure of Mole
- Wind in the Willows: The Adventure of Toad
- Witchcraft

== Australian exclusives ==
In Australia, The Australian arm of Sirius released local releases of some of the above titles and some not mentioned. Here is a list of known titles

- The Art Of Landscape
- Beastly Behaviour
- Bloodsport III
- Dirty Dancing
- The Endless Summer
- First Blood
- Golf's Goof Ups
- Nikita
- Paul Is Live in Concert- Paul McCartney on the New World Tour.
- Red Scorpion
- Robo Warriors
- Shadow of a Doubt
- Slam Dunk Ernest
- Young Guns

In addition to these they also released a sub format MCD Video Cards.They are rectangular shaped CD Roms featuring less than 6 minutes of video. The main MCD Video card releases were a line of "Stars of The AFL" CD-Roms, featuring footage of Australian Rules Football matches. There's at least 28 known releases for the format.
