= Trepang2 =

- Developer: Trepang Studios
- Publisher: Team17
- Designers: Wilson Chung; Jacob Andersson; Brandon Tran
- Programmers: Wilson Chung; Jacob Andersson
- Writers: Wilson Chung; Brandon Tran
- Composer: Brandon McKagan
- Engine: Unreal Engine 4
- Platforms: Windows; Xbox Series X/S; PlayStation 5
- Release: Windows; June 21, 2023; Xbox Series X/S, PlayStation 5; October 2, 2023
- Genre: First-person shooter
- Mode: Single-player

Trepang2 (stylized as Trepang^{2}) is a first-person shooter video game developed by Trepang Studios and published by Team17 in June 2023. Players control a soldier with superhuman strength and reflexes as they raid black sites and other clandestine locations to fight back against a corporation who kept them prisoner. It has received mostly positive reviews for its graphics, guns, and movement, although it also drew criticism for its short length and story. It has been described as heavily inspired by, or a spiritual successor to, the video game series F.E.A.R..

== Gameplay ==
The "Gunnarson Complex" side-mission, in which the player has taken a hostage and is wielding a shotgun with one hand

The gameplay is similar to many mid-2000s first-person shooters. Players control an amnesiac super soldier who wakes up in a black site of a mysterious, militarized corporation. The protagonist is handcuffed and must initially rely exclusively on stealth, but players eventually gain weapons and fight their way through enemies, both human and paranormal. The player can move in a manner typical of a first-person shooter protagonist, such as crouching, sprinting, jumping, and sliding, most of which deplete a stamina gauge. Stamina may be restored by simply waiting, or by killing enemies, which also gives a short burst of unlimited stamina. Players also have the ability to slow down time using a bullet time effect, and to turn invisible, each for separate short periods.

The player character can wield a variety of both real and fictional firearms, such as a SPAS-12 shotgun and H&K Mark 23 pistol alongside a "bolt launcher" that can fire both long, penetrating or explosive rods. Players can carry two distinct weapons at a time, in addition to hand grenades. They eventually gain the ability to dual wield their weapons, except for the minigun and bolt launcher.

Throughout the game, weapon modifications can be obtained which may be attached and swapped out. Some modifications mirror real-world attachments while some are fictionalized: for example, the shotgun can have a choke installed, while the minigun can have "smart bullets" which home in on enemies. In close-quarters combat, the player can employ melee combat such as bashing enemies with their weapon, kicking, or grabbing a disoriented enemy to use them as a human shield. Such enemies may also be thrown, killed immediately, or thrown with their grenade pulled. The player is sometimes aided in combat by allies.

An expansion DLC, Bladekisser, was released on July 25, 2023. It adds a katana, light machine gun, revolver, and new missions.

== Plot ==
The game opens with the player awakening as prisoner of the corporation Horizon, a global business entity that oversees a large number of private military contractors while secretly conducting dangerous and inhumane experiments. The player is then rescued and broken-out by a mysterious man called Subject 105, also naming the protagonist as Subject 106. Throughout, 105 guides 106 through the facility using glow sticks, killing every guard in his wake. They are led to a security room where 105 has left a key for 106's handcuffs, next to a pistol. By fighting through the facility, 106 eventually finds the dead body of 105, who has committed suicide through seppuku. Subject 105 is holding a coin with the roman numerals CV (105) on the obverse and the logo of the Syndicate on the reverse, with "The Syndicate" on the rim. 106 upon reaching the outside is greeted by friendly mercenaries from an organization known as Task Force 27, led by their Director.

Subject 106 joins and fights with the task force to clear out several other black sites and areas of interest as a supposed white knight. In particular, Horizon facilities are raided to obtain damning evidence to reveal the company's true nature and take them down. While doing this, 106 also fights other auxiliary enemies, such as a cult of self-sacrificing worshipers of a veiled, prophetic figure known as the Patriarch. Subject 106 also encounters several drones that warn him of ulterior motives beyond corporate espionage.

After the end of his final mission of a battle with Anton Lazar, the CEO of Horizon, Subject 106 returns to his home base only to be betrayed and gassed unconscious. During it, the Director reveals the actual purpose of the Task Force and Subject 106. The Syndicate owns and operates superhuman research and cloning facilities, creating "cycles" of genetically-engineered humans for various tasks and nefarious purposes. Many enemies and characters were previous cycles themselves, also borne of the Syndicate. In particular, Anton Lazar (78) and the Patriarch (91) defected and are aligned against the Syndicate. Subject 106's task was to destroy these rogue cycles. Considering Subject 106's function now complete, Task Force 27 tries to dispose and cremate him. Subject 106 awakens just before and turns against them, breaking free and working to destroy the facility.

As he does so, Subject 107, 106's intended successor, is released and instructed to destroy 106. Just before their final battle, 107 amputates 106's left arm, forcing him to cope with using his weapons one-handed. After prevailing in a close fight against 107, 106 annihilates both Task Force 27's base of operations and himself by manually activating its self-destruct mechanism – a thermonuclear warhead – and thus "ending the cycle". If the player found every drone throughout the game, Subject 106's consciousness is instead transferred to an unknown facility and implanted into a clone of him, who is informed that his work is not over.

== Development ==
Developer Trepang Studios is based in Vancouver, Canada. Development started in 2016 as a hobby project to learn the Unreal Engine. The team grew from being a single person to four members after posting public demos. Stealth and bullet time mechanics were not originally part of the game's design, but were added later to balance the difficulty. Some enemy dialogue was also added to better allow players to react to enemy tactics, such as flanking or grenades. Team17 released it for Windows on June 21, 2023. Ports to the Xbox Series X/S and PlayStation 5 were released on October 2, 2023.

== Reception ==
Reception

Aggregate scores
Aggregator	Score
Metacritic	79/100
OpenCritic	65% recommend

Review scores
Publication	Score
Edge	7/10
Eurogamer	4/5
IGN	8/10
TechRadar	4/5

Trepang2 received "generally favorable" reviews according to review aggregator website Metacritic, scoring a 79/100 on the site. It scored a "65% Critics Recommend" on OpenCritic. It received praise for its soundtrack, graphics, gunplay, and movement; criticism was directed towards its length, story, and horror elements. Its DLC, Bladekisser, also saw positive reviews.

Reviewers praised the game's intense, satisfying gunplay and its spiritual successor status to F.E.A.R.: TechRadar said Trepang2 "delivers stylish, bloody action" but does not surpass it. Many highlighted its violence, detailed environments, particle effects, and arsenal, including dual-wielding. Wccftech's review written by Ule Lopez highlighted graphics, gun variety, and aggressive playstyles; he described its horror aspect as "magnificent horror sequences that should bring you flashbacks to FEAR 2" but also "very few and far between".

Rock Paper Shotgun's Alice O'Connor complimented the movement and combat options, such as sliding into enemies and/or using them as shields. Writing for IGN, Gabriel Moss praised the gunplay, level design, enemy variety & AI, and gratifying slow-motion, calling it a "punchy tribute shooter that channels the best of the 2000s." Video Gamer called it "an excellent ultra-violent shooter" and similarly praised the combat, stealth, and story.

Criticisms centered on the campaign's relatively short length (TechRadar described it as 8 hours including side missions), a simplistic story that lacked depth or coherence in its horror elements, and side missions that many found repetitive or less engaging compared to the few main story missions. Eurogamer wrote that "each location often consists of the same set pieces", but also hailed its options for weapon modification.
