= Travelrama USA =

1994 video game

- Developer: Zenda Studio
- Publisher: Zenda Studio
- Platforms: Classic Mac OS; Windows
- Release: 1994

Travelrama USA is a 1994 video game developed by Zenda Studios. The game takes place in the United States and the player's goal is to drive from state to state and collecting various postcards.

== Gameplay ==
In Travelrama USA, players embark on a whimsical race across the United States, collecting postcards from a pool of over 600. The game accommodates up to four players and is designed for all ages. The game blends diner-style graphics with sound effects and a mix of vintage and modern postcards. Players learn geography and cultural trivia as they travel, aided by an in-game album. A dynamic difficulty system tailors the challenge to each player's skill level: seasoned players might opt for a "driver's license" mode, while newcomers or younger participants can choose a "learner's permit," allowing the game to subtly adjust its mechanics to maintain fairness and engagement.

== Development ==
The game was announced in November 1993 by StarCore along with six other titles for Macintosh. It was released in 1994 for Classic Mac OS and Windows.

== Reception ==
Reception

Review scores
Publication	Score
CD-ROM Today	5/5
New York Daily News	1/4

Los Angeles Times said " That didn't surprise the folks at Sanctuary Woods, who say the program is especially attractive to girls who tend to shy away from the shoot-'em-up type games. Even my wife, Patti, is impressed--a rare event when it comes to computer games--by the music and scenery."

Newsday said "It's a fascinating and challenging game that familiarizes kids with maps and strategic planning"

The game was given a silver medal at the AVC's Interactive CINDY Awards.
