= Celestial Games =

South African video game developer

- Industry: Video games
- Founded: 1994
- Founder: Travis Bulford; Nick McKenzie; Brian Johnson; Caleb Salsbury
- Headquarters: Johannesburg, South Africa
- Products: Toxic Bunny; The Tainted; Toxic Bunny HD
- Website: www.celestial-games.com

Celestial Games is an independent video game development company based in Johannesburg, South Africa that started in 1994. They published two PC titles then closed their doors in 2001. In 2010, they reopened the company to work on a HD version of their most successful title, Toxic Bunny.

== 1994–2001 ==
Celestial Games decided to work on two games when they originally started, Toxic Bunny and Arni the Mental Armadillo. They quickly realized that two projects were too ambitious and focused their team of four on their more popular idea, Toxic Bunny. The team worked on this project for a year and a half. Nick McKenzie and Travis Bulford worked on the development of the game, while Caleb Salsbury focused on the art. In 1996, a local game distributor Vision Software bought into the idea of Toxic Bunny and funded the last six months of development. When published, Toxic Bunny sold 7000 units in South Africa and a further 150,000 units internationally.

After Toxic Bunny was published Celestial Games started working on a new title, The Tainted, a science fiction action role-playing video game. The Tainted sold a few thousand units. Celestial tried to keep its doors open for another year, but due to financial issues, decided to close the company.

== 2007–2010 ==
In 2007, Travis Bulford and Nick McKenzie decided to port Toxic Bunny to Java. Realising its potential it went from being a small part-time production to a full-time production. As progress was made with the port, Bulford realized the opportunity available and started exploring new graphical avenues. It was at this point, in 2010, that Celestial officially opened its doors again with a new team of developers and artists production for Toxic Bunny was in full swing.

== 2011–2013 ==
The production for Toxic Bunny HD was, at this point, moving quickly but carefully. Redrawing all the sprites and drawing all the levels was the team's top priority. The game was set for release in the first quarter of 2011, but due to the extent of changes made to the game, the release date was moved back to the 4th quarter of 2012. Toxic Bunny was eventually released in October 2012 at the rAge Gaming Expo and was distributed by Apex.

In 2013, Sony made their Sony Mobile development kit available to developers around the world, which Celestial saw as the perfect opportunity to start porting Toxic Bunny to the PlayStation Vita.
