= Toxic Bunny =

1996 video game

- Developer: Celestial Games
- Publishers: Vision Software; SoftKey
- Platform: MS-DOS
- Release: WW: 19 Nov 1996
- Genre: Platform
- Mode: Single-player

Toxic Bunny is a side-scrolling platform game for MS-DOS released in 1996 by Celestial Games. The game's premise is that a bunny named Toxic, a coffee-guzzling, gun-slinging maniac, is having a bad day. There are four large levels and a variety of weapons.

The game has been called a psychedelic parody of the Epic Games character, Jazz Jackrabbit. A sequel was announced in 2000 for Xbox and PlayStation 2, but was cancelled.
