= Timeline (video game) =

2000 video game

- Cover art by Michel Bohbot
- Developer: Timeline Computer Entertainment
- Publisher: Eidos Interactive
- Director: Michael Crichton
- Producers: Bob Griswold; Paul Wirth
- Designers: Mike Backes; Michael Crichton; Readeanna Edwards; David Alan Smith
- Programmer: Rick Towson
- Artist: Chris Haire
- Composer: Bill Brown
- Platform: Microsoft Windows
- Release: NA: November 13, 2000; EU: 2000
- Genres: Adventure; Puzzle
- Mode: Single-player

Timeline is a 2000 adventure/puzzle video game published by Eidos Interactive for Microsoft Windows. The game was developed by author Michael Crichton's Timeline Computer Entertainment (initially formed as Timeline Studios), and is based on Crichton's 1999 novel of the same name. Crichton was directly involved in the game's creation.

== Gameplay ==
Timeline is played from a first-person perspective, with a focus on adventure and puzzle-solving. The plot of Timeline is largely similar to the novel, with some changes that include the absence of the novel's scientific aspect and character development, and the removal of characters such as Andre Marek.

In the game, a group of scientists discover a method of time travel and ventures to 14th-century France to conduct research. When one of the scientists, Edward Johnston, does not return from the trip, a graduate student named Christopher Hughes travels to the time era to search for Johnston. The player controls Hughes, and is accompanied by Kate, who provides hints to the player throughout the game. The game is divided into various chapters, which include the player participating in a jousting tournament. Enemies cannot be killed in the game, as doing so could disrupt Hughes' future timeline. Killing an enemy results in the player being forced to restart from the last save point. The game includes a free-roaming tour mode, in which the player can observe the environment while Michael Crichton provides narration to explain the history of the area.

== Development and release ==
In April 1999, Crichton announced the formation of his own video game development company, Timeline Studios, which would develop games based on Crichton's previous projects. In May 1999, publishing company Eidos Interactive announced that it had invested a stake in Timeline Studios as part of a publishing deal. Development began that month on Timeline's first project, an unspecified video game planned for the first half of 2000. On June 21, 2000, Eidos announced that the company's first game with Timeline Computer Entertainment would be Timeline, based on Crichton's 1999 novel of the same name. Eidos had hoped that Timeline would break new ground with its emphasis on diverse environments, interactivity, and story.

Crichton worked on the game as director and as a game designer. Crichton often held video conferences with the development team to approve and disapprove of gameplay elements. On the game's official website, Crichton described Timeline as "a game for people that don't usually play games." The development team hoped to create a game that would be easy enough for new players, but still challenging enough for more experienced players. Paul Wirth, a producer on the game, said, "One of the design objectives was making it so the average person could finish the whole experience." An orchestral score was composed for the game by Bill Brown. Timeline was released on November 13, 2000. Copies of the game included a free copy of the novel. Timeline was the only video game developed by Timeline Computer Entertainment.

== Reception ==
Reception

Aggregate score
Aggregator	Score
Metacritic	41/100

Review scores
Publication	Score
AllGame	2/5
CNET Gamecenter	3/10
Computer Games Strategy Plus	0.5/5
Computer Gaming World	1/5
EP Daily	4.5/10
Game Informer	5.75/10
GameSpot	4.2/10
GameSpy	56%
IGN	3.8/10
Next Generation	1/5
PC Gamer (US)	36%
PC Zone	60%

Timeline received "generally unfavorable reviews" according to the review aggregation website Metacritic. Several reviewers criticized the game's character, Kate, for providing hints to the player throughout the game.

Michael Tresca of AllGame criticized the game's short length and the "mediocre" sound effects, but noted the "exceptional" music. Tresca wrote that the arcade sequences, "While a refreshing change of pace," can become repetitive, particularly because of the game's "imprecise" controls. Considering that the game is about knights, Tresca expected more sword combat: "What little there is, though, is really nothing more than a simple button-clicking exercise. Even then, you can't actually kill anyone. These elements make gameplay seem artificial within the story's context." Tresca concluded that Timeline ultimately "seems less like a time-travel experiment gone awry and more like a game design gone bad. The battles, the excitement, and the potential mix of science fiction with history, is all lost in a stilted game environment that was obviously crafted by Crichton's vision of what the game should be vs. the ultimate goal of creating a good game."

Jonathan Houghton of The Adrenaline Vault wrote that overall, Timeline "just doesn't stand up as anything more than a slightly entertaining diversion. Though there are minor problems with the graphics system, control scheme and interface, the primary drawback is that an experienced player can fly through it in around three hours and thirty minutes." Houghton, who praised the novel, felt as if he "had been robbed of what promised to be a wondrous encounter. Why Mr. Crichton felt the need to remove more than half of the storyline, I suppose we'll never know. Timeline ends up being another one of the many botched translations from a truly great piece of literature." Houghton noted that the game's tour mode "is especially interesting" for history connoisseurs, but wrote that most longtime players would likely be "sorely disappointed by the un-involving plot and quirky control scheme."

Ron Dulin of GameSpot praised the voice acting and "fairly good though somewhat bland" graphics, and wrote that "it's hard to understand what Timeline is supposed to be. It borrows good ideas from many different action games, but it isn't very fun. It's based on a lengthy page-turner; yet, it manages to include very little story of its own. And it is so short and easy that it seems like little more than a tutorial for a better game." Dulin wrote that the game's diverse chapters made it seem as if Timeline "is just a collection of scenes from different action games." Dulin felt that the game's most disappointing aspect was its "almost complete lack of story," stating that without reading the novel, "it's doubtful you'll have any idea why anything is happening, who any of these people are, or, most importantly, why you should care." Sal Accardo of GameSpy praised the game's graphics, its music, some of its levels, and its "nifty" tour mode, but wrote, "At its best moments, it barely achieves above-average status, and feels like a game that was rushed from the first day of development. This is truly a shame, because this game had some potential - I would gladly have overlooked the brevity had the story been fleshed out more and made more sense." Joe Bailey of Computer Gaming World wrote that the game "is over before it begins," with a playing time of less than five hours. Bailey wrote that the game lacks the "essential elements" that were common in Crichton's novels, stating that it was devoid of action, tension, and challenges; Bailey attributed these problems to the "dumbing-down of gameplay," which he felt would "test only the most inexperienced gamer."

Scott Steinberg of IGN, who praised the music and voice-overs, wrote that the game was "way too patronizing for any adult to take seriously," and that the "slow-moving, semi-mature" story was not suitable for younger children. Steinberg wrote that scenes in the game only looked "wondrous when viewed from afar," and also opined that the game was "especially annoying" for providing answers to each of its challenges. Kristian Brogger of Game Informer noted some of the nice-looking outdoor environments, as well as some "good voice acting and effects," but wrote that Crichton's "recent foray into the video game world with Timeline is less than good. In fact, I would be willing to suggest that he had little or nothing to do with it, judging from the overall suckhood of the title." Jay Fitzloff offered a second opinion, writing that inexperienced players might be impressed with Timeline but otherwise, "this is a lame adventure game."

Niko Sylvester of The Electric Playground criticized the game's linear gameplay and its controls, as well as the Kate character, "who tells you exactly what you need to do, even if she's chained to the wall in a dungeon three floors below you. Having Kate around is like having a narrated walkthrough you can't turn off." Sylvester wrote that some of the game's graphics "are quite nice" when viewed from a distance, but stated that a majority of them were "uninspiring at best." Sylvester called the game's music "actually quite good, if occasionally repetitive. [...] The other sound effects are occasionally very good, sometimes extremely irritating, but mostly average." Sylvester concluded that Timeline could make a decent family video game to play. Erik Wolpaw of Computer Games Strategy Plus criticized the game's short length of approximately 90 minutes, and wrote that in general, progressing through each level "is a slightly more challenging version of clicking the install program's 'Next' button." Samuel Bass of NextGen said, "Short, dull, and ugly, this wretched trip to the Renaissance Faire should have been left on the bookshelf where it belongs."

=== Sales ===
According to Mark Asher of GameSpy, Timeline was a "sales flop". Its developer closed after its release.
