= Thea: The Awakening =

2015 video game

- Developer: MuHa Games
- Publisher: MuHa Games
- Engine: Unity
- Platforms: Microsoft Windows; PlayStation 4; Xbox One; Nintendo Switch
- Release: November 20, 2015: PC; NA: November 20, 2015; XB1, PS4; NA: May 31, 2017; Switch; NA: February 1, 2019
- Genre: Strategy
- Modes: Single-player, multiplayer

Thea: The Awakening is a 2015 strategy video game developed and released by MuHa Games. It is based on Slavic folklore and includes minigames based on several different genres. It was followed by Thea 2: The Shattering. Another installment, Project Thea, was released to Steam early access on November 20, 2025.

== Gameplay ==
Thea: The Awakening combines minigames from several different genres, including turn-based 4X games, role-playing video games, and digital collectible card games. Players take the role of a Slavic deity in fantasy world that is recovering from a magical apocalypse. After establishing a village, players send out characters to explore and collect resources, which can be used for crafting useful items. Unlike traditional 4X games, players control only a single village and do not conquer others. Combat, quests, and random events are resolved using a card-based minigame. Characters gain experience points and loot from winning combat, and injured characters can die if they are not healed. Cooperative multiplayer was added in 2016.

== Development ==
Quest designer Mila "Yuuki" Irek cited author Andrzej Sapkowski and Warhammer 40,000 as her chief influences. The Witcher, a video game series based on Sapkowski's novels, had previously introduced Slavic folklore to international audiences, and Irek was interested in further exploration. The game's Slavic folklore comes mostly from research into the oral history of these myths by Polish academic Aleksander Brückner. Rather than the war between good and evil commonly found in Western folklore, these stories focus on individuals and are more morally ambiguous, which translates well into the choices presented to players in video games. Irek said she attempted to stay true to the folklore but had to change some details to fit the medium. The PC version was released on November 30, 2015; the Xbox One and PlayStation 4 versions were released on May 31, 2017; and the Nintendo Switch version was released on February 1, 2019.

== Reception ==
Reception

Aggregate score
Aggregator	Score
Metacritic	PC: 73/100; NS: 71/100

On Metacritic, the PC and Switch versions received "mixed or average reviews". Rob Zacny wrote in his review for Rock Paper Shotgun that he was initially excited by the game's use of multiple genres, which avoided many cliches of strategy games. However, he later felt the game was "a large collection of small ideas" that excels at nothing, and the gameplay, which he said can be addictive, is ultimately unsatisfying. Mark Steighner of Hardcore Gamer rated the game 3.5/5 stars and wrote that it "starts off strong before collapsing under the weight of its systems". While praising the Switch version of the game for having "some really great ideas", Nintendo Life critic Dom Reseigh-Lincoln said it focuses too much on busy work and micromanagement. Reseigh-Lincoln rated it 6/10 stars. Greg Delmage of RPGFan praised the Switch version's "incredibly addictive gameplay" and rated it 85/100.
