= Tormented Souls =

2021 video game

- Developer: Dual Effect
- Publisher: PQube
- Platforms: Nintendo Switch; PlayStation 4; PlayStation 5; Windows; Xbox One; Xbox Series X/S
- Release: PlayStation 5, Windows; 27 August 2021; Xbox Series X/S; 7 September 2021; PlayStation 4, Xbox One; 25 February 2022; Nintendo Switch; 14 April 2022
- Genre: Survival horror
- Mode: Single-player

Tormented Souls is a 2021 survival horror video game developed by Dual Effect and published by PQube for PlayStation 5, Windows and Xbox Series X/S. The PlayStation 4 and Xbox One versions were cancelled in February 2021 but were eventually released in February 2022. A sequel, Tormented Souls 2, was released in 2025.

== Gameplay ==
Tormented Souls is a third-person survival horror game in the style of the original Resident Evil with fixed camera angles and optional "tank" controls. The player explores an abandoned hospital and can interact with the environment and certain NPCs, solve puzzles, and use improvised weapons to combat monsters that inhabit the hospital.

== Synopsis ==
The story begins in December 1994, with Caroline Walker, a young Canadian woman, receiving an old, damaged photograph of twin girls by mail. Prompted by nightmares to find out what has happened to the girls, Caroline follows the unknown sender's address to the abandoned Wildberger Hospital in Winterlake, Blackwood Island; however, she is ambushed and knocked unconscious by an unknown assailant immediately upon arrival. She awakens naked in a bathtub, connected to an old respirator, and discovers that her right eye has been surgically removed.

Aided by an elderly local priest, Father Noah, Caroline explores the dilapidated mansion-turned-hospital in hopes of finding answers. She encounters horribly disfigured, vaguely humanoid monsters (later revealed to be hospital's former patients, transformed by some mysterious radiation), but is able to defend herself against them using various improvised weapons. Noah tells Caroline that the twin girls in the photograph – daughters of the hospital's director, Dr. William Wildberger – went missing in 1980, and were never found.

During her investigation, Caroline finds several VHS tapes that allow her to travel back through time, to the day of a specific tape's recording. She learns that Noah – revealed to be the maternal grandfather of the missing twin girls – is a leading member of the Pollux Sect, a long-forgotten religious cult. An ancient underground temple discovered deep beneath the mansion contains an "egg" (also referred to as a "sacred placenta") of a god-like being, whose (re)birth will supposedly cleanse humanity of its sins and bring about an age of prosperity. The Pollux Sect have been ritually sacrificing sets of twins kidnapped from the town of Winterlake in order to feed their "special" blood to the egg, furthering its development. In November 1980, Noah intended to use his twin granddaughters in a sacrificial ritual, but was prevented from doing so by his daughter Maria. One of the sisters managed to escape, but the other was captured and imprisoned by Noah. Maria herself soon succumbed to a sickness induced by the supernatural radiation emanating from the egg.

Upon piecing together the gruesome story of the Wildberger family, Caroline realizes that she was born Emma Wildberger, the twin girl who managed to escape Winterlake fourteen years prior by lucky happenstance, but lost all of her childhood memories after falling off a bridge. While exploring the sewers below the mansion, Caroline has several dangerous encounters with the monstrous, mutated form of her twin sister Anna, driven mad and feral by years of isolation; Caroline ultimately kills her out of mercy. In order to bypass a secure door to the underground temple that requires the biometric data of a set of twins to open, Caroline uses a VHS tape to travel back to recent past and retrieves an eye from her past unconscious self (explaining why she originally woke up in the bathtub without one). Once the door to the temple is open, a desperate Noah offers his own blood to the egg in hopes of forcing a premature birth of the cult's supposed "savior"; he ends up bleeding to death, but the creature nevertheless wakes up and attacks Caroline. She kills the gargantuan monster by dropping a large mining drill on it, crushing its two heads.

The game's ending depends on Caroline's interactions with the monstrous form of Anna. If she ignores Anna completely, Anna ambushes her as she attempts to leave the mansion. If she discovers an antidote for Anna's mutation and then mercy kills her, Caroline leaves the mansion safe but heart-broken. However, Caroline can also use a VHS tape to travel back in time, to November 1980, where she rescues Anna's past self from a holding cell and brings her back to 1994. The two sisters then leave the mansion together.

== Reception ==
Reception

Aggregate scores
| Aggregator | Score |
|---|---|
| Metacritic | (NS) 78/100 (PC) 75/100 (PS5) 72/100 (XSXS) 79/100 |
| OpenCritic | 58% recommend (Note: Based on 70 reviews) |

Review scores
| Publication | Score |
|---|---|
| GameRevolution | 8.5/10 |
| Hardcore Gamer | 4/5 |
| Nintendo Life | 6/10 |

Tormented Souls received "generally favorable" reviews for the Nintendo Switch, Windows and Xbox Series X/S versions while the PlayStation 5 version received "mixed or average" reviews, according to review aggregator website Metacritic.
