= A Tale of Two Kingdoms =

2007 video game

- Developer: Crystal Shard
- Publisher: Crystal Shard
- Engine: Adventure Game Studio
- Platform: Microsoft Windows
- Release: July 15, 2007
- Genres: Fantasy, Point-and-click adventure
- Mode: Single-player

A Tale of Two Kingdoms is a fantasy adventure game developed by Dutch studio Crystal Shard. Developed using the Adventure Game Studio engine, and won numerous AGS Awards.

== Plot ==
The game revolves around two kingdoms, Qualinem and Theylinn, who were at war for many years. The war was ended when the evil King Vortigern of Theylinn was defeated by a group of three citizens from Qualinem; Lady Branwyn, the mercenary warrior woman, Taleisian, the wise and plucky bard, and Maeldun Whiteblade, the leader of men.

The game's main protagonist is Maeldun Whiteblade, who with his quick wit and a magical belt from his father, quests to redeem his name after he is framed for the murder of the king.

== Reception ==
Just Adventure gave a favorable review for A Tale of Two Kingdoms, saying that it "probably won't get your trigger-happy younger brother into adventure games, but it might convince any adventure fans you know that the genre is alive and well, and thriving within the independent gaming community." Adventure Gamers gave a mixed review, praising the game's graphics and music while saying that there were several elements that detracted from the game as whole. Games for Windows and PC Zone both gave favorable reviews for the game, and PC Zone praised the game's ability to solve puzzles in multiple ways.

=== Awards ===
- AGS Award for Best Puzzles (2007)
- AGS Award for Best Animation (2007)
- AGS Award for Best Sound Effects (2007)
- AGS Award for Best Tutorial or Documentation (2007)
