= Trash (video game) =

2005 video game

- Developer(s): Inhuman Games
- Publisher(s): Inhuman Games
- Designer(s): Mark Currie
- Platform(s): Microsoft Windows
- Release: September 20, 2005
- Genre(s): Real-time strategy
- Mode(s): Single-player, multiplayer

Trash is a 2005 real-time strategy game developed by Inhuman Games. It was released on September 20, 2005, for Windows.

== Plot ==
The game takes place in a post-apocalyptic future where, after the great nuclear war of 2015, peace treaties were signed, nuclear weapons were destroyed, and civilization was slowly rebuilt. However, 8 years after treaties were signed, a fleet of alien ships appeared outside Earth's atmosphere. Several super weapons were fired from the largest of the alien spacecraft, the resulting explosions causing major alterations to Earth's geography. Fearing for the lives of every human on earth, the United States Government unleashed its hidden nuclear arsenal on the alien ships. The resulting explosions rained down onto the planet, causing buildings to be destroyed and the air to be poisoned by radiation. As a result, in 10 hours, 5 of the 9 billion humans on Earth were killed.

The remaining smaller alien ships traveled into Earth's atmosphere, but never landed due to resistance by the remaining humans on earth.

After the alien ships left, mutants slowly began to appear, initially doing nothing more than raiding human settlements for building materials and kidnapping humans. As these incidents were few and far between, and by now many people had lost much of their families and other social contacts, most of these went unnoticed.

However, the mutants had their own plans. The mutants were hybrids of the aliens that came to conquer Earth. They injected captured humans with their own DNA, causing them to mutate. Eventually, the mutants' forces were strong enough to take on the humans. The mutants deployed their forces, and the war between the humans and mutants began.

== Gameplay ==
Trash consists of two species: Humans and Mutants. The gameplay is focused mostly on multiplayer skirmishes. There are now single player campaigns, although they are still in beta mode, and there is an AI for single player skirmishes though it is not highly advanced. One integral feature is that if a human and a mutant are allied then they are able to benefit from each other's technology; something that most games do not allow. This does somewhat contradict the game story, but the story is not a central focus of the gameplay.

The main resource in the game, used by both races, is trash. Trash is used as a building material for almost every unit in the game. It must be collected by Dump Trucks or Thralls, which are the collection and building units for humans and mutants respectively. Both of these units are collectively referred to as peons.

There are two other resources in the game, Gas and People. Gas is used as a resource only by humans, while people are as a resource only used by mutants. Gas is gathered by building a refinery on top of a gas site. The refineries in Trash, unlike such buildings in other games such as StarCraft, do not require continuous collection. People are acquired from unarmed huts, and must be collected by thralls.

In addition to that, there are special building sites in the game. Most core buildings can be built without the need of a special site. Such buildings mainly include unit-producing buildings and resource buildings. There are three types of sites in Trash, they are: toxic waste sites, precious metal sites, and gas sites. Every race has upgrades for units or special structures which can only be built on such sites. Destroying a structure built on such a site does not destroy the site however the site can be destroyed by a military unit, unless it is a gas site. Gas sites, however, must be discovered through special detection and are generally rather more scarce than the other sites.

Structures in Trash must be connected together by pipe. Pipe is an inexpensive structure that is built together, and forms the basis of logistics in Trash. Unlike other RTS games where resources seem to magically pop from one place to another where needed, in Trash they must travel through pipe. This also applies to technologies which are researched. Technology can be shared with an allied player by constructing a pipe to link your pipe system with your ally's. If the pipe between two bases of the same player is broken, the two bases become effectively isolated, as a result, the resource indicator is divided into two in order to show readings for each base. Then the player can only use the resources available on one pipe network for building on that network, unless the pipe is rebuilt.

== Reception ==
The game was given the 2005 Multiplayer Game of the Year award by GameTunnel.
