= Thea 2: The Shattering =

2019 video game

- Developer(s): MuHa Games
- Publisher(s): MuHa Games (PC); RockGame
- Engine: Unity
- Platform(s): Windows, Xbox One, Nintendo Switch, PlayStation 4
- Release: Windows; May 13, 2019; Switch; August 19, 2021; Xbox One; January 28, 2022; PlayStation 4; April 12, 2023
- Genre(s): Strategy
- Mode(s): Single-player, multiplayer

Thea 2: The Shattering is a 2019 strategy video game developed and released by MuHa Games. It is the sequel to Thea: The Awakening, released in 2015.

== Gameplay ==
Thea 2 establishes a canonical history of what happened during and since the first game. Both games are based on Slavic folklore but take place in a high fantasy setting. A new evil rises, and the world is split into islands. The gods task a champion with stopping this evil force. The gameplay blends elements of turn-based 4X games, role-playing video games, and digital collectible card games. After choosing a patron from among the Slavic deities, players choose a champion. This character must stay alive to progress and may be one of several character classes. Any character can perform a task, such as foraging, crafting, and fighting, but classes who specialize in that task can complete it faster. Combat and events are resolved through a card game. Once the player has enough resources, they can establish a village, and, unlike the first game, they can have multiple villages or choose to stay nomadic. Crafting was overhauled from Awakening and made to depend less on grinding. More resources were also added, and children are no longer treated as a resource. To address concerns from people who disliked the card-based combat in the first game, more options were added. The collaborative multiplayer now also allows friends to assist each other in combat.

== Development ==
Developer MuHa Games attempted two unsuccessful Kickstarter crowdfunding campaigns for their previous game, Thea: The Awakening. They attributed this to being an independent game studio and the game's idiosyncratic mix of genres. Once that game was released and developed a community, MuHa Games said it was easier to reach their crowdfunding goals. Thea 2 entered early access in November 2018 and released for Microsoft Windows on May 13, 2019, on Nintendo Switch on August 19, 2021, Xbox One on January 28, 2022, and PlayStation 4 on April 12, 2023.

== Reception ==
In his review for Rock Paper Shotgun, Nic Reuben found the game's complex rules to mostly stand in the way of the parts that he considered fun: creating a sensible tale from the random events and quests. He described it as "an imperfect thing that I can't help but feel affectionate towards". In GamesRadar's list of the best 4X games, Malindy Hetfeld recommended Thea 2 for people who enjoyed elements of the genre without needing a hardcore experience. Joel A. DeWitte reviewed the Switch version for NintendoWorldReport. Describing the Switch port as "painfully slow", he said he had to complete his review by playing the PC version of the game.

During the 2022 Russian invasion of Ukraine, MuHa Games announced they would donate all proceeds from sales in Russia, Belarus, and Ukraine to support anti-war efforts, causing some people to leave negative reviews.

== External websites ==
- Official website
