= TetriNET =

1997 video game

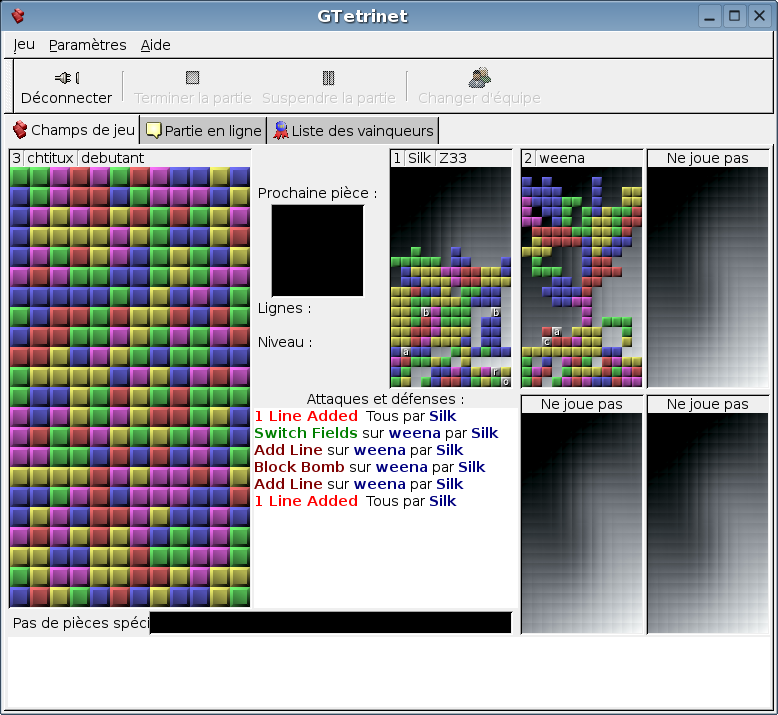
- GTetrinet, client for Linux
- Developer: Various
- Designer: St0rmCat
- Platforms: Windows, Unix, Mac OS X, BeOS, Haiku
- Release: 1997
- Genre: Puzzle
- Mode: Multiplayer

TetriNET is a multiplayer online Tetris game for up to six people that supports team play.

== History ==
TetriNET was originally developed by St0rmCat in 1997, with its last official version as 1.13. The game was originally developed for Windows and was later ported to other systems.

St0rmCat released TetriNET2 in 2000, which features improved graphics, more types of special blocks, additional features (such as hold piece and block shadows), and a master server.

== Gameplay ==
TetriNET plays like standard multiplayer Tetris but with a twist: clearing rows will cause special blocks to appear in the player's field. If a line containing a special block is cleared, then that special block is added to the player's inventory. Clearing multiple lines at once increases the number of special blocks received.

At any point, a player may use the special block at the beginning of their inventory on one of the six fields (either their own or an opponent's). The effect depends on the type of special block:

- a: Add Line – Adds one broken line to the bottom of the target field.
- c: Clear Line – Clears the line on the bottom of the target field.
- b: Clear Special Blocks – Causes all special blocks on the target field to return to normal blocks.
- r: Random Blocks Clear – Random blocks are removed from the target field, often creating gaps in lines.
- o: Block Bomb – Causes any Block Bombs on the target field to "explode", causing surrounding pieces to scatter throughout the field.
- q: Blockquake – Causes blocks on each line on the target field to shift, creating an earthquake-like effect.
- g: Block Gravity – Causes blocks on that target field to immediately fall into any gaps and instantly deletes any complete lines which are created.
- s: Switch Fields – User and target switch fields.
- n: Nuke Field – Removes all blocks from the target field.

The last player still able to place pieces in their field is the winner.

Depending on the server used, some alternative rules may be available.

- pure: special blocks are disabled, providing gameplay similar to traditional multiplayer Tetris.
- 7tetris: the first player to make seven Tetrises is the winner.

== Music ==
The classic TetriNET download came with a single MIDI file that plays during game. This music is known as "The Dance of the Spheres" and its authorship is claimed by David Lilja, who was known as Davie M. Karlsson when he wrote the MIDI file.

== Variants ==
In addition to the rules implemented by the standard TetriNET 1.13 client, there are a number of variants available.

=== TetriFast ===
TetriFast removes the one-second delay between pieces found in standard TetriNET gameplay. As the piece delay is implemented client-side, a trivial modification was made to the network protocol to prevent TetriFast clients connecting to standard TetriNET games.

=== TetriNET/TetriFast 1.14 ===
The 1.14 protocol is another variant, where every player will receive the same sequence of pieces.

=== Blocktrix ===
Blocktrix is an alternative TetriNET client for Windows. In addition to supporting traditional TetriNET and TetriFast protocols, it has a newer Blocktrix mode that includes a number of additional special block types:

- l: Left Gravity – Pulls all blocks as far left as possible, leaving any horizontal gaps at the right edge of the field.
- p: Piece Change – Changes the current piece.
- z: Zebra Field – Clears every second column of the field.

=== TetriNET2 ===
TetriNET2 is a multiplayer Tetris game by the original creator of TetriNET. In addition to the special blocks found in the original TetriNET, it has five new ones:

- Immunity – Target cannot be affected by any special for a default of 15 seconds.
- Clear Column – Deletes a random column from the target field.
- Mutate Pieces – A certain number of the target's next pieces (default 3) become large and awkwardly shaped.
- Darkness – Target cannot see anything on their field besides the current piece and its immediate surroundings for a default of 10 seconds.
- Confusion – Causes target's controls to "mix up" for a default of 10 seconds (for example, the key that normally moves the piece left may start moving the piece right instead.)

In late 2007, like other clones, TetriNET2 was shut down via cease and desist per the request of The Tetris Company. The TetriNET2 website and servers became unavailable for several years. As of early 2010, TetriNET2 is back up per request of fans that weren't satisfied with the lack of game development by The Tetris Company. The TetriNET2 website and servers have been recovered, relocated, and restored.

== Popularity and reception ==
With clients for various platforms available, the game was also well received in the Linux community. The Linux conference linux.conf.au included a programming contest where contestants tried to program TetriNET-playing bots, who could connect to the game server and play the game. The prize for the best bot was a A$40,000 IBM pSeries server. The game was also played in LAN parties. Game Revolution named TetriNET as affordable alternative to Tetris. In a 1999 review of The Next Tetris, Game Revolution named TetriNET as "truer to its Tetris roots" and "If you want multi-player Tetris, the network based Tetrinet is much more fun.".
