= Team 47 GoMan =

1997 video game

- Developer: 47-TEK
- Publisher: 47-TEK
- Platform: Windows
- Release: 1997

Team 47 GoMan is a 1997 video game from 47-TEK.

== Gameplay ==
Team 47 GoMan centers on battles in an urban environment between a player‑controlled battlesuit and a large monster. The player moves through a city while attempting to track the creature, using an automatic camera system that can also be switched manually among ten available viewpoints. Combat involves firing weapons at the monster while avoiding its attacks, including homing mines that approach from behind. The player must also prevent buildings from being destroyed, as they collapse when struck by the monster. Each stage requires defeating the creature three times, as it returns in progressively altered forms.

== Development ==
The game was developed by 47-TEK, a company founded in 1993 in California. It was originally scheduled to release in December 1995.

A PlayStation version was in development for release in Japan in October 1995, but was cancelled.

== Reception ==
Reception

Review scores
Publication	Score
Computer Gaming World	3.5/5
Computer Games Magazine	1.5/5
GameRevolution	B
GameStar	35%
PC Joker	52%
PC Games	C-

Computer Games Magazine said "Go-Man really could have been a more interesting version of Virtual On!, but the terrible controls and camera work end up doing more damage than Godzilla in Tokyo".

GameRevolution said "If you want to get hooked on an addictive game, strap yourself into one of the combat chassis of Team 47 Goman".
