= TiQal =

2008 video game

- Developer: Slapdash Games
- Publisher: Microsoft Game Studios
- Platforms: Xbox Live Arcade, Microsoft Windows
- Release: March 26, 2008
- Genre: Puzzle game
- Modes: Single-player, multiplayer

TiQal is a Mayan-themed downloadable Tetris variant created by American studio Slapdash Games for Xbox Live Arcade and Windows-based PCs. The title was released on Marketplace on March 26, 2008.

== Gameplay ==
Gameplay screenshot

TiQal is a rising block puzzle game set in the pre-Columbian Yucatán Peninsula in which the player shoots rotatable Tetris-like block formations from the top of the screen to form 2x2 square blocks. The blocks glow for a few seconds before collapsing, allowing the player to create larger combination forms, which creates larger bonuses and occasionally releases one or more Ix Chel Hearts. Quickly creating block matches creates chains, which increases the power-up meter. The larger the chain, the more powerful the release of power-ups that affect the game board.

The player loses a life when the bricks reach the top of the board, and the game ends when the player loses with no lives available. When a player loses a life, the bricks retreat, rather than restart the level.

During the bonus round, which appears after the ninth level of a region, the player can try to build the largest block of a single color before it collapses. The game acts as an educational game as well in that it tours the Yucatán Peninsula, and between levels, gives short lessons about Mayan culture and Mesoamerica.

== Reception ==
TiQal received mixed reviews upon release.

== See also ==
- List of Tetris variants
