= Tranquility (video game) =

1991 video game

tranquility
- Developer: William A. Romanowski
- Publishers: TQworld, LLC.
- Designer: William A. Romanowski
- Platforms: Mac OS X (10.4 Tiger), Mac OS (OS 9.0.4), Windows 8/Me/NT4/2000/XP Home/XP Pro
- Release: 1991, 2001
- Genres: Platformer, Music, Art
- Mode: Single player

tranquility is a nonviolent musical platform game created by musician William A. Romanowski in 1991 for Silicon Graphics computers and adapted ten years later for Macintosh and Windows computers. The game features generative algorithms that determine music and level layout based on the player's actions. For this reason, and due to its use of generated ambient music, the game's philosophy has been compared to that of Transcendentalism and the New Age Movement. According to the game's publishers, some players have reported immersion in the game to produce a dream-like experience during and after play. The game notably appeared first as a demo included with Silicon Graphics computers. It was updated and re-released as a commercial game 10 years later in 2001, with internet support architected by David Cook and Cookware Inc. This version of the game was supported for 10 years but a notice that the game was to be retired appeared on the website in 2010. As of now, the site is inaccessible. Although the game is still capable of playing local demo levels, starting with macOS Catalina, 32-bit apps were no longer compatible with macOS.

Detailed information about Tranquility and its history were published by William A. Romanowski in a 2007 pitch for social funding.

== Gameplay ==
In tranquility, the player (from an abstract, first-person viewpoint) floats in a sea of starlit geometric structures called "platforms" in order to pass through targets called "spinners" (camouflaged star-shaped objects scattered at a density of one per room). The game's challenge is derived from the difficulty in locating the variously placed "spinners" and as such the game may be compared to hide-and-seek. Level progression is nonlinear, and the game is intended to be self-paced, and self-directed. A number of in-game options allow players to control game speed and difficulty, including an auto-pilot button. The player controlled speed in an analog manner by pushing and pulling the mouse forwards and backwards, heading or direction by moving the mouse to each side, and gravity by clicking the left mouse button. Gravity was very gentle by default, a feature which has been regarded as an exception to the rule that platform games should not use first-person perspective, as it allowed players to land jumps without much difficulty.

=== Level advancement and scoring ===
Advancement through the game is accomplished by finding each spinner in all 3,087 rooms. Progression through the hierarchy of "realms," "ranks," "sets of rooms," and "rooms" results in incrementation of the player's "level." Thus, there are 21 realms in total, 7 ranks per realm (for a total of 147 realms), 3 sets of rooms per rank (for a total of 441 sets of rooms), and 7 rooms per set of rooms (for the full total of 3,087 rooms). Each room contains 1 spinner.

Completing each rank advances the player by 1 level, making for a total of 147 levels. Each rank and realm adds subtle complexity to game play by interactively evolving to correspond with the player's actions. This acts to enhance replay value, and provides for lengthier play experience.

The essential elements that define a tranquility room are:

- "Platform" - Typically hundreds of them in number, platforms lie in a variety of groups. Each group of platforms is synchronized in movement and color.
- "Spinner" - a special platform that, when reached, completes the room and advances the player to the next room. (Note: The developers do allow the engine to create rooms in rare instances with no spinner).
- A distant background star-field
- A floor, usually marked with a grid pattern for spatial reference
- An interactive generated soundtrack that corresponds to the movement of the player within the game.
- In-game physics - allow for movement of the player within the game,
  - "Gravity" - Movement downwards is caused by the "gravity".
  - Lateral movements are controlled by the player, usually by moving the mouse.
  - Movement downwards is controlled by the player, usually by holding down the mouse button to increase the rate of descent.
  - Movement upwards occurs when the player "bounces" off of a platform or the floor. Upward velocity depends on the player's rate of descent towards the platform/floor.

== Generative aspects (music) ==
Designed by musician William A. Romanowski, the musical aspects of the game are notable in that they are generated using algorithms designed to respond to the player's interactions with the interface. The game's AI algorithms were initially developed using the Nord Modular Synthesizer, with those concepts applied to the game's music and graphics generation systems. The music engine creates unique, arrhythmic musical compositions for each player's levels, providing an immersive, sensual environment. In this way the game can be compared to generative music games Rez, and Otocky.
