= Tormentum – Dark Sorrow =

2015 video game

- Developer: OhNoo Studio
- Publisher: OhNoo Studio
- Platforms: Microsoft Windows, OS X, Android, iOS
- Release: Windows, OS X; 4 March 2015; Android, iOS; 19 April 2016
- Genre: Point-and-click adventure
- Mode: Single-player

Tormentum – Dark Sorrow is a point-and-click adventure game developed and published by OhNoo Studio. The game was released for Microsoft Windows and OS X in March 2015. It was later released for Android and iOS in April 2016.

== Development and release ==
Tormentum – Dark Sorrow was developed OhNoo Studio, a three-man development team based in Poland. Tormentum's visual aesthetic is inspired by the works of painters H. R. Giger and Zdzisław Beksiński. The game was released for Microsoft Windows and OS X on 4 March 2015, after a successful crowdfunding campaign on Indiegogo and being greenlit on Steam. A game demo was made available prior to the game's full release. The game was later released for Android and iOS on 19 April 2016.

== Reception ==
Reception

Aggregate score
Aggregator	Score
Metacritic	72/100

Tormentum – Dark Sorrow received positive reviews from critics, with aggregator review website Metacritic marking the game 72/100. Game Rant scored the game at 80% saying "gloomy and fascinating take on the point-and-click adventure game", citing the art style as "breathtaking". However, Game Rant also stated that the puzzles should be more inventive and writing needed work.

== Sequel ==
The sequel titled Tormentum II was confirmed in 2018 and was scheduled to be released on 20 June 2019, but the Steam page was updated to state it will be released in 2020. Tormentum II was released on Steam on July 23,2026.
