= Tank Universal =

2008 video game

- Developer: Dialogue Design
- Publisher: Meridian4
- Engine: Blitz3D
- Platforms: Windows Vista, Windows XP, Windows 2000
- Release: August 21, 2008 (Steam)
- Genre: Action
- Mode: Single-player

Tank Universal is a computer game developed by New Zealand studio Dialogue Design and published by Meridian4. It currently features a 20-level single player campaign as well as a skirmish mode. Its graphical style has been described as "Tron-like", while its gameplay takes inspiration from the classic Atari title Battlezone. As of August 21, 2008, it is available on Valve's Steam digital distribution service.
