= Terrawars: New York Invasion =

2006 video game

- Developer: Ladyluck Digital Media
- Publishers: Tri Synergy; G2 Games
- Platform: Windows
- Release: June 28, 2006
- Genre: First-person shooter
- Modes: Single-player, multiplayer

Terrawars: New York Invasion (stylized as Terrawars: NY Invasion) is a sci-fi first-person shooter computer game developed by Ladyluck Digital Media, first released by Tri Synergy on June 28, 2006 for Windows.

== Gameplay ==
The player assumes the role of John Armstrong, a medical student with the National Guard who must repel an alien invasion.

== Development ==
The development team took about 5,000 digital photos of Downtown New York City and used many references about Manhattan to replicate the real-life locations in-game.

== Reception ==
The game was met with universally negative reviews. The game's sound, graphics, and gameplay was criticized all around.
