= Transformice =

2010 video game

- Logo for Transformice
- Developer: Atelier 801
- Publisher: Atelier 801
- Designers: Tigrounette; Melibellule
- Artist: Mélanie Christin
- Composer: Romain Trouillet
- Engine: Adobe Flash Player; Box2D
- Platforms: Online (Adobe Flash); Microsoft Windows macOS; Linux
- Release: May 1, 2010
- Genres: Massively multiplayer online, platform
- Mode: Multiplayer

Transformice is an online multiplayer free-to-play platform and indie game by Atelier 801. Created by French game designers, Melibellule produces the game's artwork and graphics, while Tigrounette programs the game's functions and mechanics. Transformice was released as a browser game on May 1, 2010, and on Steam as a free-to-play game on January 30, 2015. Transformice requires either a web browser running Adobe Flash Player 9.0+, Adobe AIR to run the official standalone or Steam to play the game.

== Gameplay ==
Mice racing around a user-created map to figure out how to get to the cheese. Bubbles indicate a mouse who falls off the map. Hearts indicate a mouse who has brought the cheese to the hole.

The main objective of the game is to collect a piece of cheese placed in at least one location on a map. Players control a mouse with the arrow keys or the WASD keys to run, duck, jump and perform various techniques, such as wall jumping, long jumping, turn arounds, and corner jumping. Players' mice must touch the cheese to collect it. After which, the player must take the collected cheese back to the map's mouse hole to finish. The number of cheese and mouse holes varies between maps. Players are awarded points on a scoreboard that is updated in real-time. Bonus points are awarded for players who place first, second or third. Collecting cheese is recorded into a player's permanent stats when there are about 2 or more players in the room. Players are also given extra recognition in their stats for finishing first when there are eleven or more players in the room. Maps have a general time limit of two minutes, at which time a new map is loaded. Maps can instantly switch before the time limit if all players complete the map or die. The timer will change to 20 seconds if the Shaman dies or there if are only two mice left on the map. Dying adds one point to a player's score on the scoreboard, no matter what time in the game it is or the cause of death.

When a player reaches the highest score on the scoreboard, they will become a Shaman in the next map involving one. The general objective of the Shaman is to help the other mice obtain the cheese and bring it back to the hole. Doing so will award the Shaman with "saves" for each mouse who completes the map, which are recorded onto the player's profile. The Shaman can do so by summoning objects such as planks, boxes, anvils, spirit, and balloons to create buildings or contraptions such as bridges to cross gaps or various other obstacles. A Shaman can 'anchor' or connect planks and boxes to other world objects or summoned objects with various-colored nails. Red nails keep an object firmly grounded and will not move, but it can rotate on the anchor. Yellow nails connect to most other objects, particularly red-nailed ones, and keep an object's placement, but can move. Blue nails connect two objects but are loose and can rotate.

Upon reaching 1,000 total saves as a Shaman, a player can choose to become a 'hard mode' Shaman. In hard mode, a Shaman cannot use red nails which anchor an object solidly, nor can they use the Spirit tool, which can push mice and objects with a flash of light. Spirit is the only object allowed to be cast outside of summoning range. In lieu of this, hard mode Shamans can create a pre-made 'totem', which is constructed on an in-game editor map. Totems can be constructed with up to 20 objects, but only one red nail may be used as an anchor. A completed totem construction can be summoned instantly as a hard mode Shaman and is immediately functional, but may only be summoned once per map. After saving 5,000 total mice, 2,000 being in hard mode, a player will unlock the 'divine mode' Shaman setting, a setting released as an update on May 26, 2014. In addition to not being able to use red nails and the Spirit tool, a divine mode shaman cannot use yellow nails which connect and stabilize most objects, nor can they use a totem. Despite the constraints, divine mode Shamans have the ability to spawn available objects almost anywhere on a map.

Collected cheese is also saved up and used as currency in the game. Players can use this currency to buy virtual clothing items for their mouse in the game's item shop. Players can also buy virtual clothing items by purchasing 'fraises', an in-game currency that can be obtained by paying real money. Items are purely visual and do not give bonus stats. Players can also create their own maps via an in-game editor. Created maps must be verified by a test run of the map where the creator has to be able to successfully collect the cheese and bring it back to the hole. Once verified, players can choose to submit their map into rotation at the cost of 40 cheese.

An in-game achievement system awards players with new titles and badges. Titles are awarded for collecting specific numbers of cheese, obtaining a certain amount of first place victories, accumulating saves as a Shaman, buying items from the shop and completing events. Badges are awarded for buying any type of fur (except plains) from the shop and completing events.

An experience and level system was added on July 29, 2013, allowing mice to unlock Shaman abilities and traits by collecting cheese and saving mice. The abilities are separated into five trees: Spiritual Guide, Wind Master, Mechanician, Wildling, and Physicist. A Spiritual Guide increases the Shaman's ability to save more mice, a Wind Master focuses on the Shaman's mobility, a Mechanician gives the Shaman more options when it comes to building, a Wildling enhances both objects and mice, and a Physicist increases the Shaman's power.

Trolling is considered a part of the game, as stated in the in-game 'Game Rules' menu. Some players infrequently decide to troll, whether playing as the Shaman or a normal mouse. Shamans can kill other mice by striking them with cannonballs and other objects, creating structures that causes lag to other players, as well as blocking them from progressing in the map by building a structure that is impossible to pass. Normal mice can troll by stalling, which is to stay on the map for as long as possible without capturing the cheese. Normal mice may also choose to push the Shaman's buildings off the stage. In maps where there is collision detection, they can also push other mice, including the Shaman, off the stage. Trollers can also use the in-game consumables to make a shaman build go haywire or slow down mice. Common consumables used are tombstones, pufferfish, balls, snowballs, jack-o'-lanterns, chickens, paper planes, paper balls and energy orbs.

== Development ==
The game was developed by Melibellule (real name Mélanie Christin) and Tigrounette (real name Jean-Baptiste Le Marchand). The two met at work and became friends. The idea for Transformice came about when the two decided to team up and create a game together. Tigrounette had experience making games in the past and wanted Melibellule's artistry experience to help in creating the visuals. Melibellule pitched the idea of a little mouse who had to grab a piece of cheese and bring it back to the mouse hole as quickly as possible.

Before Transformice, Tigrounette had worked on another online flash game in April 2008 titled Aaaah!. The object of the game was to control a stick figure-like character through a silhouetted map to reach a pharmacy. The game had similar mechanics to Transformice, in that multiple players were competing for the same goal while one player with the most points was designated as a guide and could draw pathways to help the other players reach the goal. The game also has a map editor.

After quitting their jobs, Melibellule and Tigrounette founded the independent gaming company Atelier 801 as co-CEOs, and later published games Run for Cheese!, Bouboum, Nekodancer, Fortoresse, Dead Maze and Tomb Rumble. A sequel called Transformice Adventures is in development.

== Reception ==
The game is recognized by Kotaku, Rock, Paper, Shotgun, and PC Gamer. In 2010, GameOgre recognized the game as the best browser game of the year. The game has also received a People's Choice Award in Mochi Media's Flash Gaming Summit 2011. The game has been nominated for the 2012 indie game of the year and is under the top 100 indie games of 2012. In 2018, Pedestrian.TV recommended the game. In 2020, Game Rant ranked the game fourth in a list of best online multiplayer games that nobody is playing.

The game saw notable popularity in Turkey and Brazil.
