= Thief Simulator =

2018 video game

- Developer: Noble Muffins
- Publisher: PlayWay S.A.
- Engine: Unity
- Platforms: PlayStation 4; Microsoft Windows; Nintendo Switch; Xbox One
- Release: Microsoft Windows; November 9, 2018; Nintendo Switch; May 16, 2019; PlayStation 4 August 12, 2020
- Genres: Stealth, simulation
- Mode: Single-player

Thief Simulator is an open-world stealth video game developed by Polish developer Noble Muffins and released for Microsoft Windows on November 9, 2018, for Nintendo Switch on May 16, 2019, for PlayStation 4 on August 12, 2020, and for the Quest 2 on July 8, 2022. A sequel to the game, Thief Simulator 2, was released in October 4, 2023.

== Synopsis ==
The player assumes the role of an unnamed thief, who works for the Lombardi crime family after they paid his bail, guided by Vinny to commit crimes. At the end of the game's original story, Vinny attempts to kill the thief with a mail bomb, but fails. In a later update, the thief traverses the industrial district's buildings to steal evidence implicating the Lombardis and explosive constituents. He then stashes the evidence in the garage and the explosive charge in the office before setting it off. Vinny is presumably killed as the mansion explodes.

== Reception ==
Reception

Review scores
Publication	Score
Game Reactor	6/10
Screen Rant	3/5
Common Sense Gamer	8.2/10

Thief Simulator received generally favorable reviews and made it to the top of Steam's list of best-selling games on its opening weekend.
