= Treasure Quest (video game) =

1996 video game

- Developers: Soggy in Seattle Productions; Sirius Entertainment Inc.
- Publisher: Sirius Publishing Inc.
- Platforms: Windows 3.1x, Windows 95, Mac OS
- Release: April 10, 1996
- Genre: Puzzle
- Mode: Single-player

Treasure Quest is a puzzle game released by Sirius Entertainment on April 10, 1996.

In the CD-ROM scavenger hunt game Treasure Quest, the player moves from room to room in the mansion of Professor Jonathon William Faulkner, who has bequeathed 1 million dollars to any student who can solve the puzzles he has laid out. To move from one room to the next, players must find a famous quote from visual clues, words and anagrams, and then derive an ultimate solution to the game.

Throughout the game, the player is guided by the professor's long-dead love, played by Terry Farrell, who was brought into the project by Star Trek/Star Wars author Daryl F. Mallett, who worked at the company at the time.

Much of the game's popularity stemmed from the developer's openness about, and players' willingness to share, clues and room quotes, so long as the final solution was kept confidential.

The soundtrack featured 11 songs by Jody Marie Gnant (daughter of Sirius Publishing's CEO, Richard A. Gnant,) some of which contained clues. Treasure Quest: The Official Resource Guide (Sirius Publishing, 1996) was written by Steve Schwartz with guidance from Sirius Publishing and was available for purchase at the game's launch.

== Development ==
Inspired by the book Masquerade and its associated treasure hunt, the game was initially developed by Soggy in Seattle Productions, which then sold its interests to Sirius Productions. Development was completed by David Whipple and Christian Huygen of Motion Pixels, a sister company to Sirius Publishing.

The large number of typos and errors in the game were the result of efforts to keep the ultimate answer hidden even from the employees at the company. As the game neared completion, one of the company managers insisted that the game needed to be played to completion to ensure the proper level of quality. The manager feared that such a complex game could be undone by a single error. In order to make sure the ultimate answer remained unknown even by company employees, the game was split in half, 5 rooms each, and tested by two separate groups. One group was composed of employees based at the company headquarters in Scottsdale, AZ while the other consisted of the two programmers who worked remotely. The team at corporate headquarters found many errors and all were corrected. The programming team reported that they had completed their half and found and corrected some errors, but because of the management decision to put a wall between the two groups, neither half was ever verified by the other. Those familiar with the game have noticed that there are no game stopping errors in five of the ten rooms while each of the other rooms contain at least one significant error. It is not clear which group of rooms was tested by which group. However, it has also been reported that the majority of the errors can be discovered and that it is still possible to solve the puzzle despite the errors. This has led others to speculate that the errors were intentional and meant to drive players to the game site forum and to stimulate sales of the companion book.

== Release ==
The game was released on April 10, 1996, at 10:07 p.m. EST, with Richard Gnant commenting "Everything about Treasure Quest is a clue." The game had originally been scheduled for release on March 22 at 12:14 a.m. EST, reportedly also selected as a clue, but was delayed by technical issues and number of copies shipped.

In a unique marketing ploy, Sirius Publishing, Inc. offered a $1,000,000 prize to the first eligible player who could solve the mystery of Treasure Quest and submit an explanation of the solution to the complete satisfaction of a panel of judges. The contest would end on December 31, 1999 if no winner was determined.

The ultimate solution, as given by the developer Cerise Casper (now Cerise Vablais) to Sirius Publishing, was "The Tree of Life", referring to both wisdom and the love of the professor's lost fiancée Rose. It references both the Kabbalah and Proverbs 3:18, "She is a tree of life to them that lay hold upon her: and happy is every one that retaineth her." The rooms and corridors in the game were connected like those in the Kabbalah's diagram.

The "outcome" of this game is steeped in controversy.

Paul Wigowsky of Woodburn, Oregon submitted the "Tree of Life" solution with the ten room quotes on May 31, 1996. Wigowsky was a schoolteacher and a student of esoteric teachings. He immediately recognized that the design of the 10-room mansion with the 22 connections between the rooms was the same design that he had seen in books on the Hebrew Kabbalah with the 10 Sephira and twenty-two paths (also twenty-two letters of the Hebrew alphabet). It was afterwards admitted by the producer of the game that this quester was indeed the first to submit the correct solution; however, the player was disqualified on the technicality that he did not put the required registration number in the upper right hand corner of the submission (as required by the rules of the game). Shortly afterwards, Sirius Publishing released a statement that the $1 million prize was won. They posted the solution to the game on their website. A person by the name of P. Dreizen of San Francisco, California, won the game and the cash prize in May 1998. It was speculated that the person "P. Dreizen" is actually an anagram of "End Prize." Many of the people that collaborated online wonder why the person never showed up to discussions or participated in the chat rooms. They believed a game of such complexity couldn't be solved alone.

== Reception ==
Entertainment Weekly wrote that "Sirius Publishing is using a time-honored motivator to get skeptical shoppers to cough up 50 bucks for its latest game, Treasure Quest: avarice."

In 1996, Computer Gaming World declared Treasure Quest the 25th-worst computer game ever released.

=== Awards ===
1996 Invision Gold Award for Best Strategy/Puzzle Game Title, given by New Media Magazine

== Bibliography ==
- Dembo, Arinn. "Treasure Quest," in Computer Gaming World 146 (Sept 1996): 164–167.
- Giovetti, Al. Treasure Quest at thecomputershow.com
- House, Michael L. Treasure Quest at allgame.com
- Melanson, Mike. 20. Treasure Quest at Multimedia Exploration Journal (Feb 16, 2003).
- Miller, Chuck. Treasure Quest at cnet.com
- Phil, Thé. "Treasure Quest," in Computer Games Strategy Plus 70 (Sept 1996): 108.
- Poole, Stephen. Treasure Quest at GameSpot.com (Jun 14, 1996).
- Sauer, John. "Treasure Quest," in PC Games (Jul 1996): 56.
- Slugansky, Randy. "The 10 Biggest Turkeys of All Time," at JustAdventure.com
- Young, Rosemary. Treasure Quest at QuandaryLand.com (Jul 1996).
- Treasure Quest at MobyGames.com
