= Atelier 801 =

French video game developer

- Type: Private
- Industry: Video games
- Founded: October 14, 2011; 14 years ago
- Founders: Jean-Baptiste Le Marchand; Mélanie Christin
- Headquarters: Lille, France
- Number of employees: <50
- Website: atelier801.com

Atelier 801 is a French independent video game development company founded by Jean-Baptiste Le Marchand (Tigrounette) and Mélanie Christin (Melibellule). They are best known for developing Transformice, which as of 2020 has 105 million accounts.

== History ==
=== Early years (2011–2013) ===
Transformice was the second game Le Marchand developed, after Extinction (permanently closed), a platform with three games, Aaaah!, Bouboum, and Forteresse. Transformice was a side-project of Christin, designer, and Le Marchand, developer. They posted Transformice on an online forum in 2010. The game quickly spread by word of mouth, and overwhelmed by the unexpected success of the game, they spent evenings and weekends to cope with the massive influx of players.

In 2011 they left their jobs at Ankama to start Atelier 801, allowing them to finally fulfill players' demand by working full time on the game and now employing ten extra people. Atelier 801 was hosted in one of the business incubators of the northern La Ruche network in Tourcoing until January 2013, when they moved to Lille. Between August 2012 and August 2013, Atelier 801 posted sales of $1.2 million.

They received, in 2013, the "Entrepreneur of the Year" prize by the local Nord area.

Atelier 801 revived two of Le Marchand's games with Bouboum in 2013 and then Fortoresse a few months later. The year 2014 proved to be busy as they released Nekodancer, a massively multiplayer musical game, and then their first mobile game on iOS and Android called Run for Cheese, the first one set in the Transformice universe, in October 2014.

=== 2015–present ===
In 2015, they co-produced Transformice: The Cartoon Series, an animated series set in the Transformice universe, with Cross River Productions and Believe Digital. They also began working on Dead Maze, a survival MMO set in a contemporary world, filled with zombies and crafting possibilities. It was released on Steam on 13 February 2018.

In May 2019, Atelier 801 launched a Kickstarter campaign for Transformice Adventures, another game set in the Transformice universe. The campaign was cancelled two weeks later, although the game is still in development. Eight employees were laid off. In July 2019, Antarès was released.

In 2021, the multiplayer platform game Tomb Rumble was released on Steam.

In 2022, Christin left Atelier 801.

== Games ==
All games are available on Windows, macOS and Linux, except Run for Cheese (iOS and Android).

Year	Title	Notes
2010	Transformice	Released on Steam in 2015
2013	Bouboum	Released on Steam in 2020
2014	Fortoresse	Released on Steam in 2020
2014	Nekodancer	
2014	Run for Cheese	Pulled from game stores
2015	Celousco	Cancelled
2018	Dead Maze	Released on Steam in 2018
2019	Antarès	
2021	Tomb Rumble	Released on Steam in 2021
TBA	Transformice Adventures	Demo available
