= Gamescom =

Video game trade fair

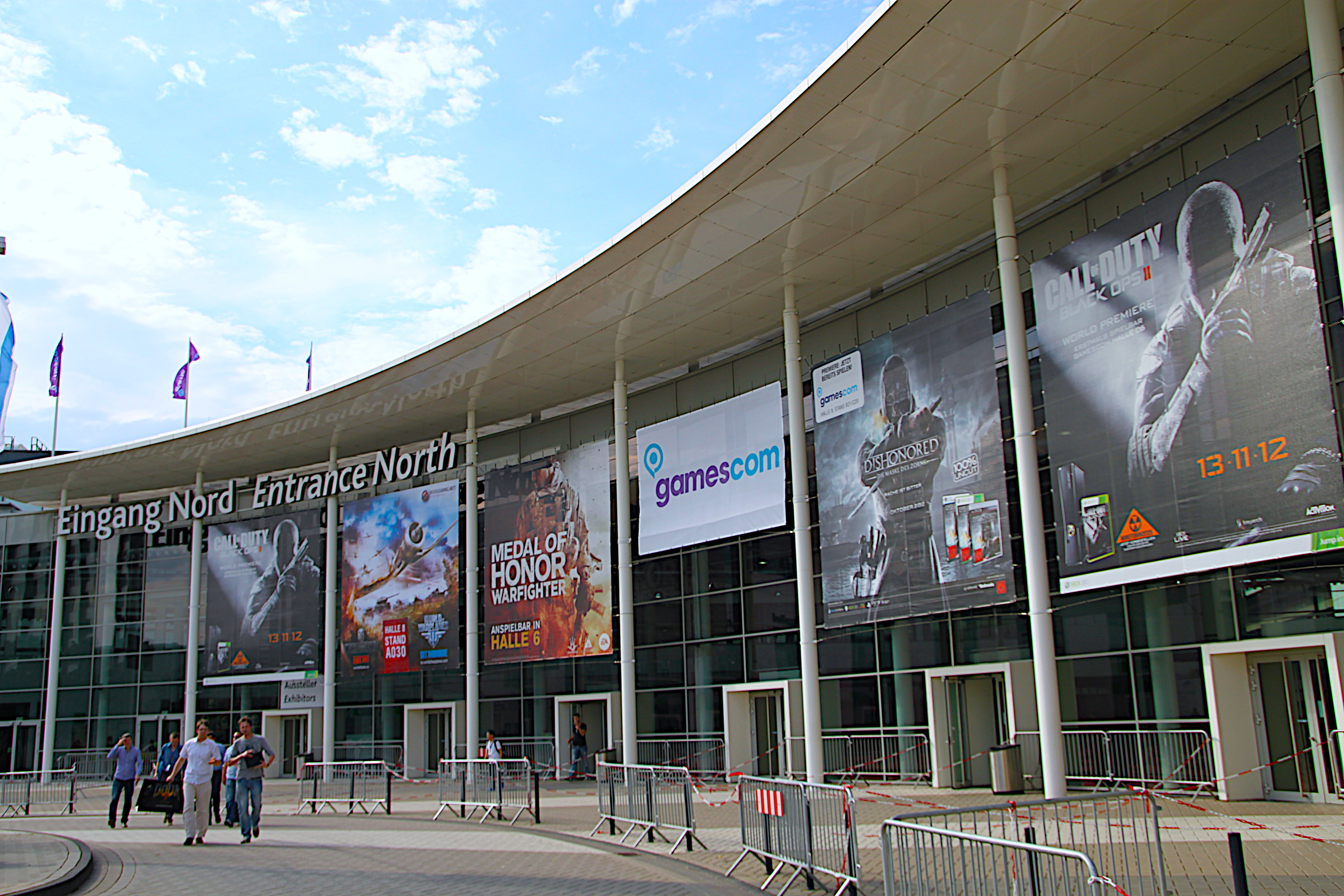
- The north entrance to Gamescom 2012 at the Koelnmesse
- Status: Active
- Genre: Video games Interactive entertainment
- Venue: Koelnmesse
- Locations: Cologne, Germany
- Coordinates: 50.94257°N 6.958976°E
- Country: Germany; Singapore (Gamescom Asia); Brazil (Gamescom LatAm); Thailand (Gamescom Asia × Thailand Game Show)
- Inaugurated: 19 August 2009; 17 years ago
- Most recent: 26 August 2026; 2 months ago
- Next event: 23 August 2027; 9 months' time
- Attendance: ▲357,000 (2025)
- Organizer: game – The German Games Industry Association (2018–present)
- Website: gamescom.global

Gamescom is a trade fair for video games held annually at the Koelnmesse in Cologne, Germany. Gamescom is the world's largest gaming event, with 370,000 visitors and 1,037 exhibitors from 56 countries attending the event in 2018. The event is used by many video game developers to exhibit upcoming games and game-related hardware. The "gamescom - Opening Night Live" (ONL) show takes place every year on the evening before the opening. The show presents the latest trailers and announcements from the international games industry and is hosted by Geoff Keighley.

Alongside the public areas, there is also a closed area for professional visitors, such as publishers, journalists and developers.

Shortly before Gamescom, the associated conference Devcom takes place at the same area and is specifically for the game development sector. At the end of Devcom 2025, the conference announced a rebrand and took place for the first time under the new name gamescom dev from 23 to 25 August 2026.

== History ==
The Federal Association of Interactive Entertainment Software had previously hosted the Games Convention in Leipzig from 2002 to 2008, which was briefly the largest games trade show in the world. However, Leipzig was becoming unsuitable for such a large event owing to limited transport links and hotel accommodation. The BIU and Koelnmesse announced a new event circuit in 2008, to be held in Cologne beginning in 2009. The Leipzig Trade Fair opposed the move and intended to continue Games Convention without the BIU, which led to a five-month "standoff" between the two groups. As Leipzig did not allow the Cologne event to be called "Games Convention", the BIU instead adopted "GamesCom". The two events were due to take part on the same weekend, and were each competing to be seen as the "authoritative" German trade fair for the industry. In the end, after a deal between Gamescom and GDC, Leipzig announced that Games Convention would be cancelled, and replaced by an online only event that focused on mobile and casual gaming. Gamescom was first held in August 2009, and was extremely successful, while Games Convention Online was discontinued after 2010.

The BIU continued to support and administer the event until 2018, when it merged with the industry body GAME. Their successor organisation the game – The German Games Industry Association has continued in the same role. Geoff Keighley began hosting Opening Night Live from 2019, a streamed event at the beginning of the show. Opening Night Live has served as a platform for many trailer launches and game announcements.

Since the COVID-19 pandemic, which caused the discontinuation of E3, Gamescom has been the largest event of its kind. Gamescom Latam, first held in Brazil in 2024, is also the largest event in the Americas.

== Areas ==
The following exhibition areas are located on the site:

• entertainment area
• event arena
• merchandise area
• indie area
• cosplay village
• retro & family area
• artist area
• cards & boards area
• signing area
• campus area
• business area

== Events ==
=== 2009 ===
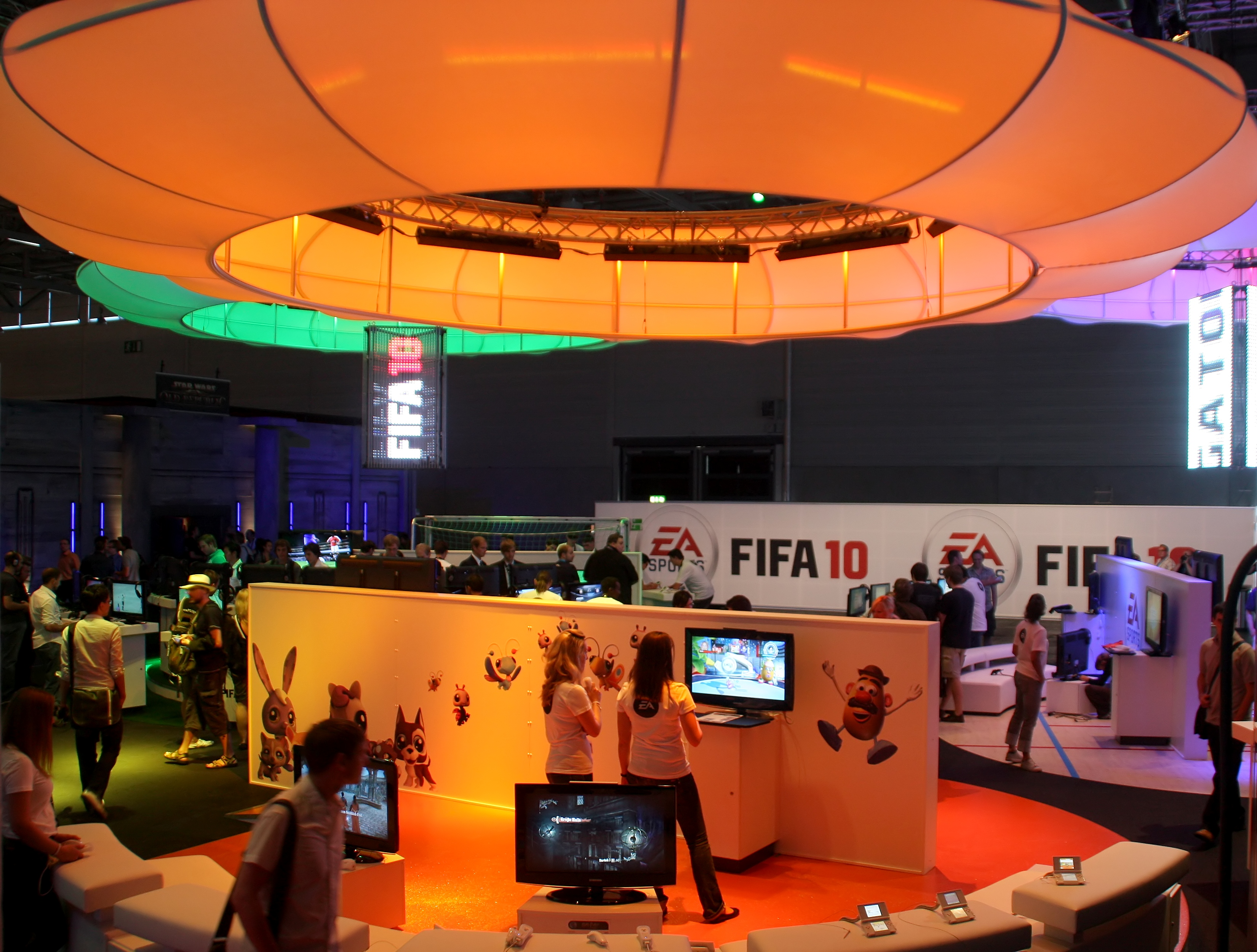
The booth of Electronic Arts in 2009

Gamescom 2009 was held 19–23 August. 245,000 people attended that year's visit.

==== Exhibitors ====
2009 exhibitors
2K Games: Mafia II (360, PC, PS3); BioShock 2 (360, PC, PS3); Activision; Diablo III (PC, 360, PS3); DJ Hero (360, PS2, PS3, Wii); Guitar Hero 5 (360, PS2, PS3, Wii); Call of Duty: Modern Warfare 2 (360, PC, PS3); StarCraft II: Wings of Liberty (PC); Tony Hawk: Ride (360, PS3, Wii); Atari: Star Trek Online (PC); Capcom: Dark Void (360, PC, PS3); Lost Planet 2 (360, PC, PS3); Monster Hunter Tri (Wii); Spyborgs (Wii); Electronic Arts: Battlefield: Bad Company 2 (360, PC, PS3); Crysis 3 (360, PC, PS3); Dante's Inferno (360, PS3, PSP); Dragon Age: Origins (360, PC, PS3); FIFA 10 (360, DS, PC, PS2, PS3, PSP, Wii); Mass Effect 2 (360, PC); Need for Speed: Shift (360, PC, PS3, PSP); Spore Hero (Wii); Star Wars: The Old Republic (PC); The Sims 3: World Adventures (PC); Konami: Castlevania: Lords of Shadow (360, PC, PS3); Metal Gear Solid: Peace Walker (PSP); Pro Evolution Soccer 2010 (360, DS, PC, PS2, PS3, PSP, Wii); Silent Hill: Shattered Memories (PS2, PSP, Wii)	Microsoft: Fable III (360, PC); Forza Motorsport 3 (360); Halo 3: ODST (360); Kinect (360); Namco Bandai: Dragon Ball: Raging Blast (360, PS3); Katamari Forever (PS3); Tekken 6 (360, PS3, PSP); Sega: Aliens vs. Predator (360, PC, PS3); Napoleon: Total War (PC); Sony: God of War III (PS3); Gran Turismo (PSP); Gran Turismo 5 (PS3); Heavy Rain (PS3); LittleBigPlanet (PSP); MAG (PS3); ModNation Racers (PS3, PSP); Ratchet & Clank Future: A Crack in Time (PS3); Uncharted 2: Among Thieves (PS3); White Knight Chronicles (PS3); Square Enix: Final Fantasy XIII (360, PC, PS3); Final Fantasy XIV (PC); Kingdom Hearts 358/2 Days (DS); Supreme Commander 2 (360, PC); Ubisoft: Assassin's Creed II (360, PC, PS3); Avatar: The Game (360, DS, PC, PS3, PSP, Wii); R.U.S.E. (360, PC, PS3); Rabbids Go Home (DS, PC, Wii); Red Steel 2 (Wii); Tom Clancy's Splinter Cell: Conviction (360, PC)

==== Notable press conferences ====
Wednesday, 18 August:

- Electronic Arts
- Sony Computer Entertainment Europe

Thursday, 19 August:

- Microsoft Game Studios
- Konami
- Namco Bandai Games

==== Notable announcements ====
Sony Computer Entertainment Europe announced the PlayStation 3 Slim, a smaller and lighter model of the console and a release date of 1 September 2009. Firmware 3.0 for the PlayStation 3 was also announced, adding new features to the PlayStation Network. Sony announced that the European Video Store would launch in November 2009. Sony also announced that the PlayStation Portable would get smaller games (under 100mb) in the form of 'minis' and that comics would also be available to download in December 2009. A "free game" registration promotion was announced for the PSP Go.

Microsoft Game Studios announced Fable III, along with a release date of 2010. Also, Microsoft announced their intention to release Fable II on the Xbox Live Marketplace in five episodes, the first of which would be free to download.

==== Media coverage ====
While most press conferences were not available for live streaming, Electronic Arts streamed its press conference on EA.com. Sony Computer Entertainment Europe also showcased its press conference on its online community-based service PlayStation Home shortly afterwards. Sony also made its press conference available for download on the PlayStation Store. Various gaming websites offered live-blogging of the respective press conferences.

=== 2010 ===
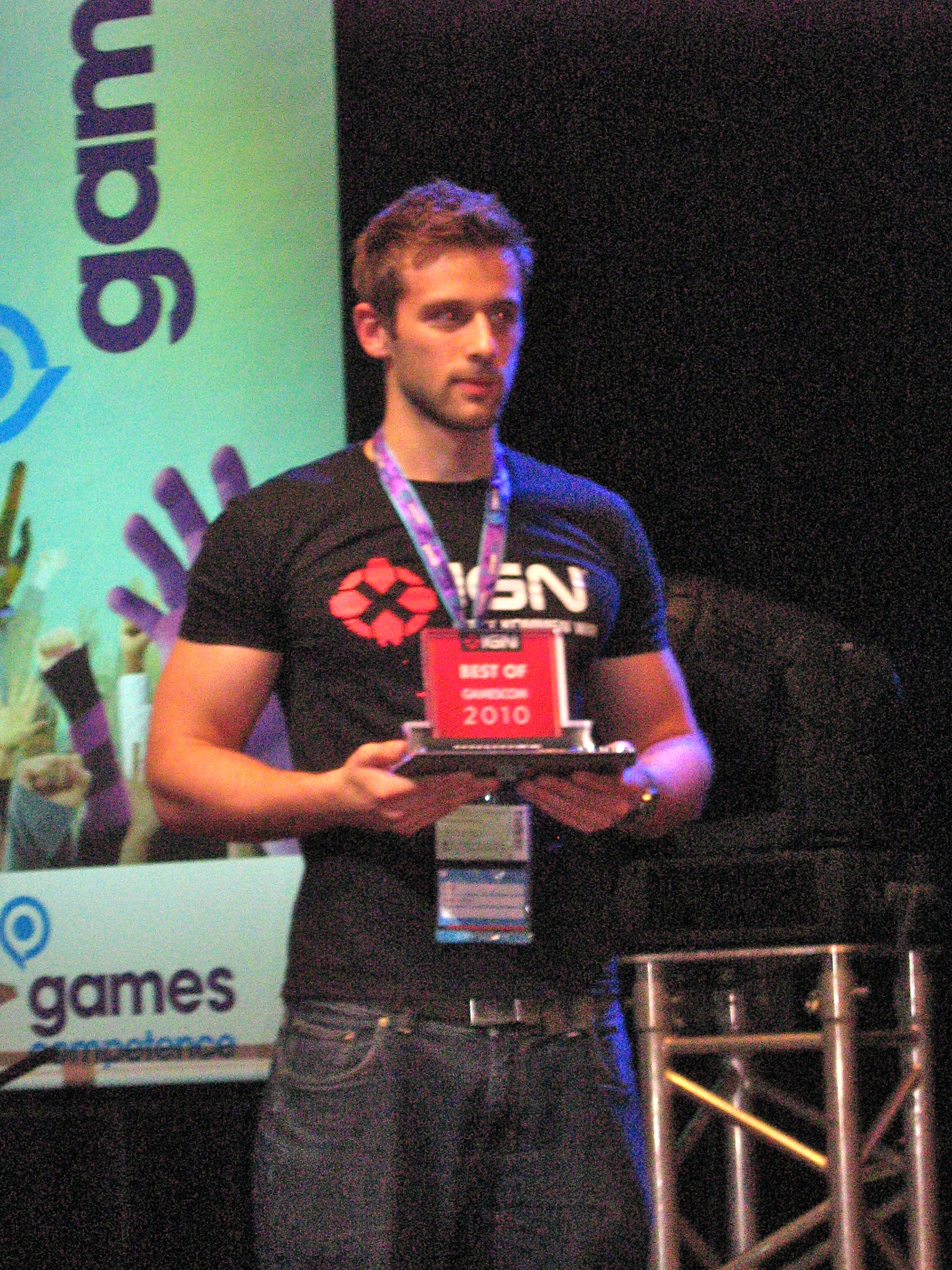
Presentation of the "Best of Gamescom" award in 2010

Gamescom 2010 was held 18–22 August. 254,000 people attended that year's visit.

==== Exhibitors ====
2010 exhibitors
2K Games: BioShock Infinite (360, PS3, PC); Civilization V (PC); Mafia II (360, PS3, PC); NBA 2K11 (360, PC, PS2, PS3, PSP, Wii); Activision: Call of Duty: Black Ops (360, DS, PC, PS3, Wii); Diablo III (360, PC, PS3); DJ Hero 2 (360, PS3, Wii); GoldenEye 007 (DS, Wii); Guitar Hero: Warriors of Rock (360, PS3, Wii); Tony Hawk: Shred (360, PS3, Wii); World of Warcraft: Cataclysm (PC); ArenaNet: Guild Wars 2 (PC); Capcom: Ghost Trick: Phantom Detective (DS); Ōkamiden (DS); Marvel vs. Capcom 3: Fate of Two Worlds (360, PS3); Street Fighter X Tekken (360, PS3); Codemasters: F1 2010 (360, PS3); Disney Interactive Studios: Epic Mickey (Wii); Electronic Arts: Crysis 2 (360, PS3, PC); Darkspore (PC); Dead Space 2 (360, PS3, PC); Dragon Age II (360, PS3, PC); EA Sports Active 2: Personal Trainer (360, PS3, Wii); FIFA 11 (360, DS, PC, PS2, PS3, PSP, Wii); Mass Effect 2 (PS3); Medal of Honor (360, PC, PS3); Need for Speed: Hot Pursuit (360, PC, PS3, Wii); Star Wars: The Old Republic (PC); Konami: Metal Gear Rising: Revengeance (360, PC, PS3); Pro Evolution Soccer 2011 (360, PC, PS2, PS3, PSP, Wii); Microsoft: Fable III (360, PC); Halo: Reach (360); Kinect (360); Windows Phone 7	MTV Games: Rock Band 3 (360, DS, PS3, Wii); Namco Bandai: Dragon Ball: Raging Blast 2 (360, PS3); Naruto Shippuden: Ultimate Ninja Storm 2 (360, PS3); Tekken X Street Fighter (360, PS3); Neowiz: Crossfire (PC); Nintendo: Donkey Kong Country Returns (Wii); Kirby's Epic Yarn (Wii); The Legend of Zelda: Skyward Sword (Wii); Metroid: Other M (Wii); RedSpotGames: Rush Rush Rally Racing (DC, Wii); Wind and Water: Puzzle Battles (DC, PC); Solar Struggle Move support (360); Sega: Virtua Tennis 4 (360, PC, PS3, Vita, Wii); Sony: Gran Turismo 5 (PS3); Heavy Rain move support (PS3); Infamous 2 (PS3); Killzone 3 (PS3); LittleBigPlanet 2 (PS3); MAG Move support (PS3); Ratchet & Clank: All 4 One (PS3); Resistance 3 (PS3); Square Enix: Deus Ex: Human Revolution (360, PC, PS3); Kingdom Hearts Birth by Sleep (PSP); The 3rd Birthday (PSP); Ubisoft: Assassin's Creed: Brotherhood (360, PS3, PC); Driver: San Francisco (360, PC, PS3, Wii); Just Dance 2 (Wii); Michael Jackson: The Experience (360, DS, PS3, PSP, Wii); Might and Magic: Heroes VI (PC); Tom Clancy's Ghost Recon: Future Soldier (360, PC, PS3); Valve: Portal 2 (360, PC, PS3)

==== Notable announcements ====
The two main announcements this Gamescom came from Insomniac Games, who announced two sequels from two of their franchises: Ratchet & Clank: All 4 One, by revealing some gameplay from the game, and Resistance 3, via a live action teaser trailer. These games will be exclusive to the PlayStation 3. All 4 One has a set release date as late 2011, while Resistance 3 did not have a release date.

=== 2011 ===
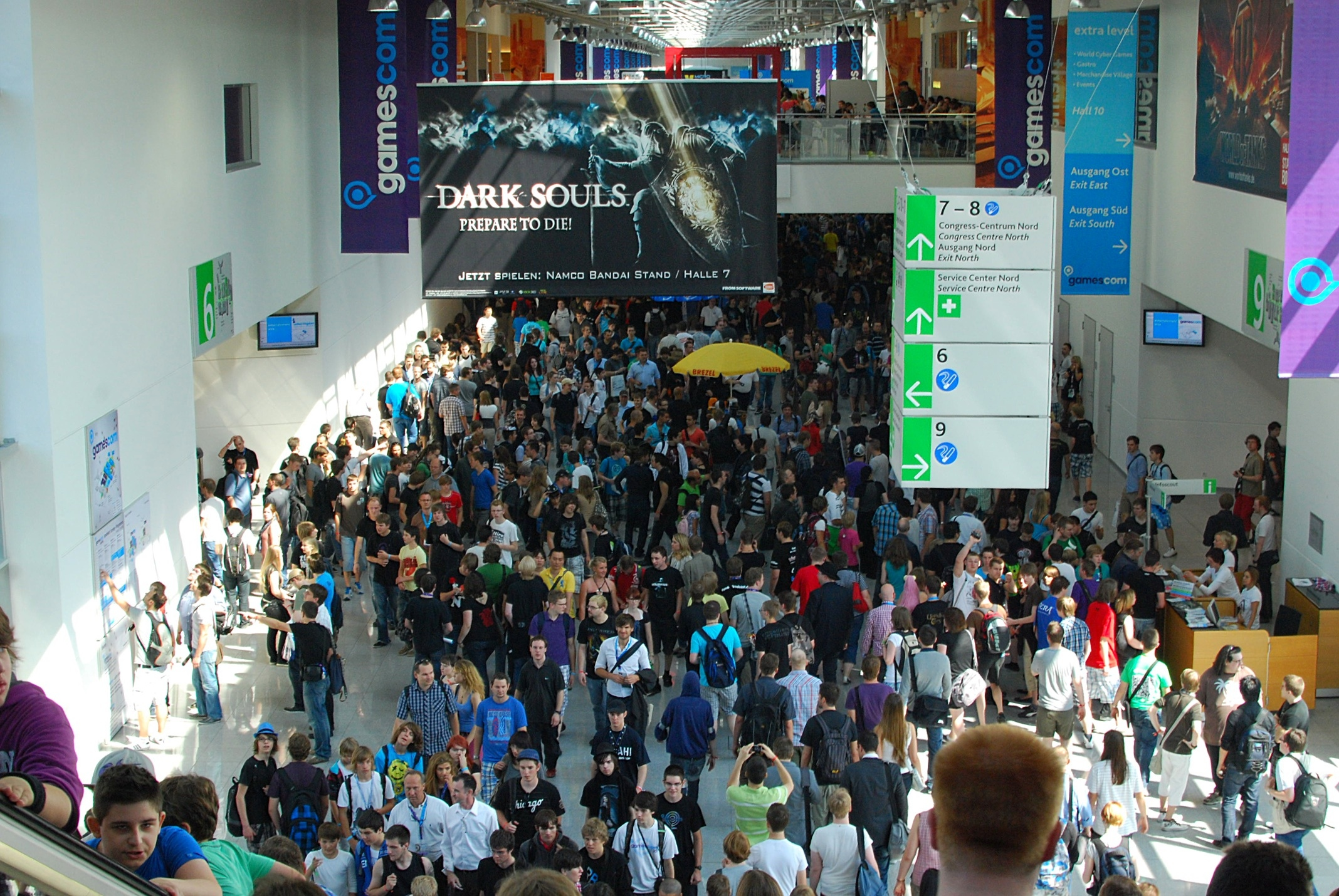
Visitors on the fair aisles in 2011

Gamescom 2011 was held 17–21 August. 275,000 people attended that year's visit.

==== Exhibitors ====
2011 exhibitors
1C Company: Men of War: Assault Squad (PC); Men of War: Vietnam (PC); Red Orchestra 2: Heroes of Stalingrad (PC); Royal Quest (PC); 2K Games: Borderlands 2 (360, PC, PS3); Activision: Call of Duty: Elite; Call of Duty: Modern Warfare 3 (360, PC, PS3, Wii); Diablo III (360, PC, PS3); GoldenEye 007: Reloaded (360, PS3); Prototype 2 (360, PC, PS3); Skylanders: Spyro's Adventure (360, 3DS, PC, PS3, Wii); Spider-Man: Edge of Time (360, 3DS, DS, PS3, Wii); StarCraft II: Heart of the Swarm (PC); World of Warcraft: Cataclysm (PC); X-Men: Destiny (360, DS, PS3, Wii); Bethesda Softworks: Dishonored (360, PC, PS3); The Elder Scrolls V: Skyrim (360, PC, PS3); Prey 2 (360, PC, PS3); Rage (360, PC, PS3); Bohemia Interactive: ARMA 3 (PC); Carrier Command: Gaea Mission (360, PC); Take On Helicopters (PC); Capcom: Asura's Wrath (360, PS3); DmC: Devil May Cry (360, PC, PS3); Dragon's Dogma (360, PS3); Resident Evil: Revelations (3DS); Street Fighter X Tekken (360, PC, PS3); Ultimate Marvel vs. Capcom 3 (360, PS3, Vita); CD Projekt Red: The Witcher 2: Assassins of Kings (360, PC); City Interactive: Sniper: Ghost Warrior 2 (360, PC, PS3); Codemasters: F1 2011 (360, 3DS, PC, PS3, Vita); Deep Silver: Risen 2: Dark Waters (360, PC, PS3); dtp Entertainment: The Cursed Crusade (360, PC, PS3); IHF Handball Challenge 12 (PC); Electronic Arts: Battlefield 3 (360, PC, PS3); Burnout Crash! (360, PS3); FIFA 12 (360, 3DS, PC, PS2, PS3, PSP, Vita, Wii); FIFA Manager 12 (PC); FIFA Superstars (PC); Kingdoms of Amalur: Reckoning (360, PC, PS3); Mass Effect 3 (360, PC, PS3, Wii U); Need for Speed: The Run (360, 3DS, PC, PS3, Wii); Need for Speed: World (PC); The Secret World (PC); The Sims 3: Pets (360, 3DS, PC, PS3); The Sims Social (PC); SSX (360, PS3); Star Wars: The Old Republic (PC); Theme Park (DS); Frogster: Runes of Magic (PC); Funcom: The Secret World (PC); Gamigo: Jagged Alliance Online (PC); Hi-Rez Studios: Tribes: Ascend (PC); Kalypso Media: Airline Tycoon 2 (PC); The Dark Eye: Demonicon (PC); Dungeons (PC); Patrician Online (PC); Tropico 4 (360, PC); Konami: Metal Gear Solid: Snake Eater 3D (3DS); Pro Evolution Soccer 2012 (360, 3DS, PC, PS2, PS3, PSP, Wii); Silent Hill: Downpour (360, PS3); Microsoft: Dance Central 2 (360); Forza Motorsport 4 (360); The Gunstringer (360); Halo: Combat Evolved Anniversary (360); Kinect Sports: Season Two (360); Steel Battalion: Heavy Armor (360); Mojang: Minecraft (PC)	Namco Bandai: Ace Combat: Assault Horizon (360, PS3); Armored Core V (360, PS3); Dark Souls (360, PS3); Go Vacation (Wii); Inversion (360, PC, PS3); Naruto Shippuden: Ultimate Ninja Storm Generations (360, PS3); Ridge Racer Unbounded (360, PC, PS3); Soulcalibur V (360, PS3); NCsoft: Guild Wars 2 (PC); WildStar (PC); Nintendo: Kid Icarus: Uprising (3DS); The Legend of Zelda: Ocarina of Time 3D (3DS); The Legend of Zelda: Skyward Sword (Wii); Luigi's Mansion: Dark Moon (3DS); Mario Kart 7 (3DS); Star Fox 64 3D (3DS); Super Mario 3D Land (3DS); Nival: King's Bounty: Legions (PC); Paradox Interactive: Crusader Kings II (PC); Red 5: Firefall (PC); Riot Games: League of Legends (PC); Rising Star Games: The King of Fighters XIII (360, PS3); Sega: Aliens: Colonial Marines (360, PC, PS3); Mario & Sonic at the London 2012 Olympic Games (3DS, Wii); Sonic Generations (360, 3DS, PC, PS3); Sony: DC Universe Online (PC, PS3); Journey (PS3); Little Deviants (Vita); LittleBigPlanet PS Vita (Vita); Medieval Moves: Deadmund's Quest (PS3); Payday: The Heist (PC, PS3); PlanetSide 2 (PC); PlayStation Vita; PSP-E1000; Ratchet & Clank: All 4 One (PS3); Resistance 3 (PS3); Sly Cooper: Thieves in Time (PS3); Sound Shapes (PS3, Vita); Starhawk (PS3); Tekken Tag Tournament 2 (360, PS3, Wii U); Uncharted 3: Drake's Deception (PS3); Warrior's Lair (PS3, Vita); THQ: Darksiders II (360, PC, PS3, Wii U); Metro: Last Light (360, PC, PS3); Saints Row: The Third (360, PC, PS3); UFC Undisputed 3 (360, PS3); Warhammer 40,000: Space Marine (360, PC, PS3); WWE '12 (360, PS3, Wii); Turbine: The Lord of the Rings Online: Rise of Isengard (PC); Ubisoft: The Adventures of Tintin: The Game (360, 3DS, PC, PS3, Wii); Anno 2070 (PC); Assassin's Creed: Revelations (360, PC, PS3); Driver: Renegade (3DS); Driver: San Francisco (360, PC, PS3, Wii); Far Cry 3 (360, PC, PS3); From Dust (360, PC, PS3); James Noir's Hollywood Crimes (3DS); Just Dance 3 (360, PS3, Wii); Michael Jackson: The Experience (3DS, Vita); Might & Magic Heroes VI (PC); Raving Rabbids: Alive & Kicking (360); Rayman Origins (360, 3DS, PC, PS3, Vita, Wii); Tom Clancy's Ghost Recon: Future Soldier (360, PC, PS3); Tom Clancy's Ghost Recon Phantoms (PC); TrackMania 2: Canyon (PC); Valve: Dota 2 (PC); Wargaming: World of Warplanes (PC); Warner Bros.: Bastion (360, PC); Batman: Arkham City (360, PC, PS3, Wii U); Gotham City Impostors (360, PC, PS3); Lego Harry Potter: Years 5–7 (360, 3DS, DS, PC, PS3, PSP, Vita, Wii); Lollipop Chainsaw (360, PS3); The Lord of the Rings: War in the North (360, PC, PS3); Sesame Street: Once Upon a Monster (360)

==== Notable events ====
- The first Dota 2 International championship took place. The tournament had the biggest prize pool of any e-sports tournament at the time.

=== 2012 ===
Gamescom 2012 was held 15–19 August. 275,000 people attended that year's visit.

==== Exhibitors ====
2012 exhibitors
1C Company: Nuclear Union (PC); Royal Quest (PC); King's Bounty: Warriors of the North (PC); 2K Games: BioShock Infinite (360, PC, PS3); Borderlands 2 (360, PC, PS3); NBA 2K13 (360, PC, PS3, PSP, Wii, Wii U); XCOM: Enemy Unknown (360, PC, PS3); Activision: 007 Legends (360, PC, PS3, Wii U); Call of Duty: Black Ops II (360, PC, PS3, Wii U); Deadpool (360, PC, PS3); StarCraft II: Heart of the Swarm (PC); Transformers: Fall of Cybertron (360, PC, PS3); World of Warcraft: Mists of Pandaria (PC); Bethesda Softworks: Dishonored (360, PC, PS3); Doom 3: BFG Edition (360, PC, PS3); Bohemia Interactive: ARMA 3 (PC); Carrier Command: Gaea Mission (360, PC); DayZ (PC); Capcom: Remember Me (360, PC, PS3); Resident Evil 6 (360, PC, PS3); DmC: Devil May Cry (360, PC, PS3); Lost Planet 3 (360, PC, PS3); Street Fighter X Tekken (Vita); Codemasters: F1 2012 (360, PC, PS3); Electronic Arts: Army of Two: The Devil's Cartel (360, PS3); Command & Conquer (PC); Crysis 3 (360, PC, PS3); Dead Space 3 (360, PC, PS3); FIFA 13 (360, 3DS, PC, PS2, PS3, PSP, Vita, Wii, Wii U); Medal of Honor: Warfighter (360, PC, PS3); Need for Speed: Most Wanted (360, PC, PS3, Vita, Wii U); SimCity (PC); Konami: Castlevania: Lords of Shadow – Mirror of Fate (3DS); Metal Gear Rising: Revengeance (360, PS3); Pro Evolution Soccer 2013 (360, 3DS, PC, PS2, PS3, PSP, Wii); Silent Hill: Book of Memories (Vita); Namco Bandai: Ace Combat: Assault Horizon (PC); Dark Souls: Prepare to Die Edition (PC); Naruto Shippuden: Ultimate Ninja Storm Generations (360, PS3); One Piece: Pirate Warriors (PS3); Ridge Racer Unbounded (360, PC, PS3); Star Trek (360, PC, PS3); Tekken Tag Tournament 2 (360, PS3, Wii U)	NCsoft: Guild Wars 2 (PC); Nexon: Navy Field 2 (PC); Shadow Company (PC); Paradox Interactive: A Game of Dwarves (PC); Dungeonland (PC); Starvoid (PC); War of the Roses (PC); Perfect World Entertainment: Neverwinter (PC); Torchlight II (PC); RedSpotGames: Rush Rush Rally Racing (Wii); Solar Struggle (360); Sturmwind (DC); Wind and Water: Puzzle Battles (PC); Sony: Dust 514 (PS3); God of War: Ascension (PS3); The Last of Us (PS3); LittleBigPlanet PS Vita (Vita); PlayStation All-Stars Battle Royale (PS3, Vita); Soul Sacrifice (Vita); Wonderbook: Book of Spells (PS3); Square Enix: Final Fantasy VII (PC); Final Fantasy XIV: A Realm Reborn (PC, PS3); Hitman: Absolution (360, PC, PS3); Quantum Conundrum (360, PC, PS3); Sleeping Dogs (360, PC, PS3); Tomb Raider (360, PC, PS3); Ubisoft: Assassin's Creed III (360, PC, PS3, Wii U); Assassin's Creed III: Liberation (Vita); ESPN Sports Connection (Wii U); Far Cry 3 (360, PC, PS3); The Hip Hop Dance Experience (360, Wii); Just Dance 4 (360, PS3, Wii, Wii U); Rabbids Land (Wii U); Rayman Legends (360, PC, PS3, Vita, Wii U); Rocksmith (360, PC, PS3); ShootMania Storm (PC); Tom Clancy's Ghost Recon Phantoms (PC); Tom Clancy's Splinter Cell: Blacklist (360, PC, PS3, Wii U); Your Shape: Fitness Evolved 2013 (Wii U); ZombiU (Wii U); Warner Bros.: Batman: Arkham City – Armored Edition (Wii U); Guardians of Middle-earth (360, PC, PS3); Injustice: Gods Among Us (360, PC, PS3, Wii U); Lego The Lord of the Rings (360, 3DS, DS, PC, PS3, Vita, Wii); The Lord of the Rings Online: Riders of Rohan (PC)

=== 2013 ===
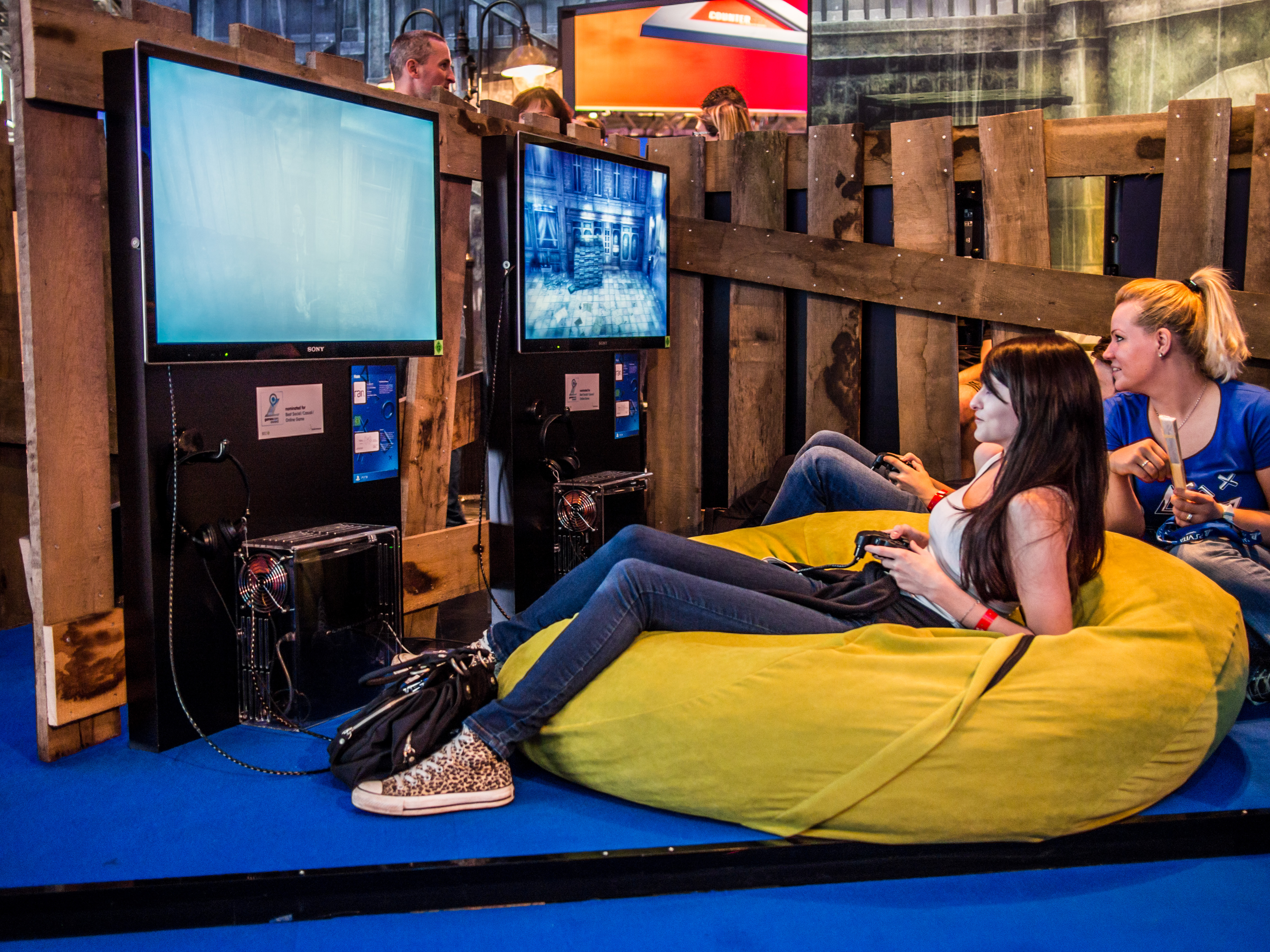
Gamers at Gamescom 2013

Gamescom 2013 was held 21–25 August. 340,000 people attended that year's visit.

==== Exhibitors ====
2013 exhibitors
1C Company: IL-2 Sturmovik: Battle of Stalingrad (PC); Men of War: Assault Squad 2 (PC); Nuclear Union (PC); 2K Games: The Bureau: XCOM Declassified (PC, PS3, X360); NBA 2K14 (PC, PS3, PS4, X360, XBO); WWE 2K14 (PS3, X360); XCOM: Enemy Unknown (PC, PS3, X360); 505 Games: Payday 2 (PC, PS3, X360); Takedown: Red Sabre (PC, X360); Activision: Angry Birds Star Wars (3DS, PS3, Vita, Wii, Wii U, X360); Call of Duty: Ghosts (PC, PS3, PS4, Wii U, X360, XBO); Destiny (PS3, PS4, X360, XBO); Diablo III (PS4, XBO); Diablo III: Reaper of Souls (PC, PS3, PS4); Hearthstone: Heroes of Warcraft (PC); Skylanders: Swap Force (3DS, PS3, PS4, Wii, Wii U, X360, XBO); Abrakam: Faëria (PC); Amplitude Studios: Dungeon of the Endless (PC); Endless Legend (PC); Bethesda Softworks: Wolfenstein: The New Order (PC, PS3, PS4, X360, XBO); The Elder Scrolls Online (PC); The Evil Within (PC, PS3, PS4, X360, XBO); Bohemia Interactive: ARMA 3 (PC); DayZ (PC); Carbine Studios: WildStar (PC); CD Projekt Red: The Witcher III: Wild Hunt (PC, PS4, XBO); City Interactive: Lords of the Fallen (PC, PS4, XBO); Crytek: Warface (PC); Deep Silver: Dead Island: Epidemic (PC); Saints Row IV (PC, PS3, X360); Wasteland 2 (PC, PS4, XBO); X Rebirth (PC); Electronic Arts: Battlefield 4 (PC, PS3, PS4, X360, XBO); Command & Conquer (PC); Dragon Age: Inquisition (PC, PS3, PS4, X360, XBO); EA Sports UFC (PS4, XBO); FIFA 14 (3DS, PC, PS2, PS3, PS4, PSP, Vita, Wii, X360, XBO); Need for Speed Rivals (PC, PS3, PS4, X360, XBO); Peggle 2 (XBO); Plants vs. Zombies: Garden Warfare (PC, X360, XBO); The Sims 4 (PC); Titanfall (PC, X360, XBO); Focus Home Interactive: Contrast (PC, PS3, PS4, X360, XBO); Sherlock Holmes: Crimes & Punishments (PC, PS3, PS4, X360, XBO); Wargame: Red Dragon (PC); Gaijin Entertainment: War Thunder (PC, PS4); Haemimont Games: Victor Vran (PC); Kalypso Media: The Dark Eye: Demonicon (PC, PS3, X360); Rise of Venice (PC); Tropico 5 (PC, X360); KING Art: Battle Worlds: Kronos (PC); Konami: Castlevania: Lords of Shadow – Ultimate Edition (PC); Castlevania: Lords of Shadow 2 (PC, PS3, X360); Pro Evolution Soccer 2014 (3DS, PC, PS2, PS3, PSP, X360); Microsoft: Dead Rising 3 (XBO); Fable Legends (PC, XBO); Forza Motorsport 5 (XBO); Killer Instinct (XBO); Kinect Sports Rivals (XBO); Max: The Curse of Brotherhood (XBO); Project Spark (PC, XBO); Ryse: Son of Rome (XBO); Zoo Tycoon (X360, XBO); Mojang: Cobalt (PC, X360, XBO); Minecraft (PS3, PS4, Vita, X360, XBO)	Namco Bandai: Dark Souls II (PC, PS3, X360); Dragon Ball Z: Battle of Z (PS3, Vita, X360); Nintendo: Donkey Kong Country: Tropical Freeze (Wii U); The Legend of Zelda: A Link Between Worlds (3DS); The Legend of Zelda: The Wind Waker HD (Wii U); Mario Kart 8 (Wii U); Pikmin 3 (Wii U); Pokémon X and Y (3DS); Professor Layton and the Azran Legacy (3DS); Sonic Lost World (Wii U, 3DS); Super Mario 3D World (Wii U); Wii Karaoke U (Wii U); Wii Party U (Wii U); The Wonderful 101 (Wii U); Paradox Interactive: Europa Universalis IV (PC); Magicka: Wizard Wars (PC); War of the Vikings (PC); Red 5 Studios: Firefall (PC); Revolution Software: Broken Sword 5: The Serpent's Curse (PC, Vita); Riot Games: League of Legends (PC); Roberts Space Industries: Star Citizen (PC); Ronimo Games: Awesomenauts (PS4); Sega: Total War: Rome II (PC); Sony Computer Entertainment: Beyond: Two Souls (PS3); Driveclub (PS4); Everybody's Gone to the Rapture (PS4); Gran Turismo 6 (PS3); Helldivers (PS3, PS4, Vita); Infamous Second Son (PS4); Killzone: Mercenary (PSVita); Killzone: Shadow Fall (PS4); Knack (PS4); Murasaki Baby (Vita); The Order: 1886 (PS4); Puppeteer (PS3); Ratchet & Clank: Into the Nexus (PS3); Rain (PS3); Resogun (PS3, PS4, Vita); Rime (PS4); Shadow of the Beast (PS4); Tearaway (Vita); Square Enix: Deus Ex: The Fall (PC); Deus Ex: Human Revolution Director's Cut (PC, PS3, Wii U, X360); Final Fantasy X/X-2 HD Remaster (PS3, Vita); Final Fantasy XIV: A Realm Reborn (PC, PS3); Final Fantasy XV (PS4, XBO); Kingdom Hearts III (PS4, XBO); Kingdom Hearts HD 1.5 Remix (PS3); Lightning Returns: Final Fantasy XIII (PS3, X360); Murdered: Soul Suspect (PC, PS3, PS4, X360, XBO); Thief (PC, PS3, PS4, PC, X360, XBO); TopWare Interactive: Raven's Cry (PC, PS3, PS4); Sacrilegium (PC, PS3, X360); Scivelation (PC, PS4, XBO); Triumph Studios: Age of Wonders III (PC); Ubisoft: Assassin's Creed IV: Black Flag (PC, PS3, PS4, Wii U, X360, XBO); The Crew (PC, PS4, X360, XBO); Fighter Within (XBO); Might & Magic X: Legacy (PC); Just Dance 2014 (PS3, PS4, Wii, Wii U, X360, XBO); The Mighty Quest for Epic Loot (PC); Rayman Legends (PS3, PS4, PC, Vita, Wii U, X360, XBO); Rocksmith 2014 (PC, PS3, PS4, X360, XBO); South Park: The Stick of Truth (PC, PS3, X360); Tom Clancy's The Division (PC, PS4, XBO); Tom Clancy's Splinter Cell: Blacklist (PC, PS3, Wii U, X360); Watch Dogs (PC, PS3, PS4, Wii U, X360, XBO); Wargaming: World of Tanks: Xbox 360 Edition (X360); World of Warplanes (PC); Warner Bros.: Batman: Arkham Origins (PC, PS3, Wii U, X360); Dying Light (PC, PS4, XBO); Lego Marvel Super Heroes (3DS, DS, PC, PS3, PS4, Vita, Wii U, X360, XBO); Mad Max (PC, PS4, XBO); Zombie Studios: Blacklight: Retribution (PS4)

==== Notable events ====
- The World Championship Series 2013 Season 2 Global Finals, a StarCraft II tournament with a $150,000 prizepool, were held during the event.
- Three League of Legends Tournaments were held during the event:
  - International Wildcard Tournament
  - Season 4 Spring Promotion Qualifier
  - European LCS Playoffs

=== 2014 ===
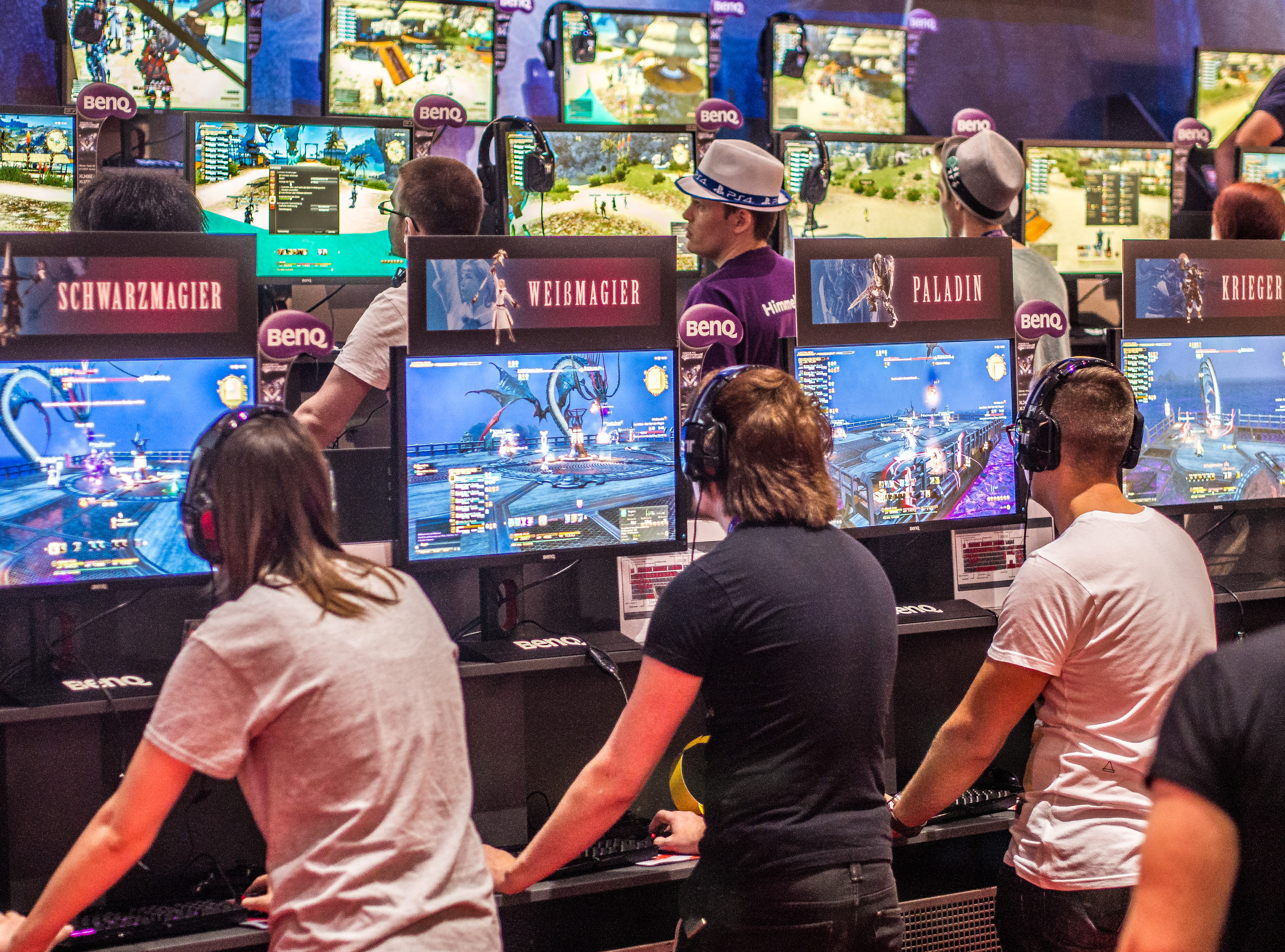
Trade fair visitors trying out a game in 2014

Gamescom 2014 was held 13–17 August. 335,000 people attended that year's visit.

==== Notable events ====
- The Counter-Strike: Global Offensive Major ESL One Cologne 2014 was held at Gamescom

==== Exhibitors ====
2014 exhibitors
2K Games: Borderlands: The Pre-Sequel! (PC, PS3, X360); Civilization: Beyond Earth (PC); Evolve (PC, PS4, XBO); NBA 2K15 (PC, PS3, PS4, X360, XBO); WWE 2K15 (PC, PS3, PS4, X360, XBO); Activision: Call of Duty: Advanced Warfare (PC, PS3, PS4, X360, XBO); Destiny (PS3, PS4, X360, XBO); Skylanders: Trap Team (3DS, PS3, PS4, Wii, Wii U, X360, XBO); Amplitude Studios: Dungeon of the Endless (PC, XBO); Asteroid Base: Lovers in a Dangerous Spacetime (PC, XBO); Atari: RollerCoaster Tycoon World (PC); Bandai Namco: Naruto Shippuden: Ultimate Ninja Storm Revolution (PC, PS3, X360); Rise of Incarnates (PC); Bethesda Softworks: BattleCry (PC); The Evil Within (PC, PS3, PS4, X360, XBO); Blizzard Entertainment: Diablo III: Reaper of Souls – Ultimate Evil Edition (PS3, PS4, X360, XBO); Hearthstone: Heroes of Warcraft (Android, iOS, PC); Heroes of the Storm (PC); StarCraft II: Legacy of the Void (PC); World of Warcraft: Warlords of Draenor (PC); Blowfish: Gunscape (XBO); Bohemia Interactive: DayZ (PS4); Bossa Studios: Surgeon Simulator: A&E Anniversary Edition (PS4); Capcom: Monster Hunter 4 Ultimate (3DS); Capybara Games: Super Time Force Ultra (PC, PS4, Vita); CD Projekt Red: The Witcher III: Wild Hunt (PC, PS4, XBO); Chainsawesome Games: Knight Squad (XBO); Cloud Imperium Games: Star Citizen (PC); Coffee Stain Studios: Goat Simulator (PC, XBO); Crytek: Arena of Fate (PC); Ryse: Son of Rome (PC); Daedalic Entertainment: Blackguards 2 (PC); Deco Digital: Pneuma: Breath of Life (XBO); Deep Silver: Dead Island 2 (PC, PS4, XBO); Dead Island: Epidemic (PC); Emergency 5 (PC); Escape Dead Island (PC, PS3, X360); Metro Redux (PC, PS4, XBO); Risen 3: Titan Lords (PC, PS3, X360); Sacred 3 (PC, PS3, X360); Devolver Digital: Hotline Miami 2: Wrong Number (PC, PS3, PS4, Vita); Not a Hero (PC, PS4, Vita); The Talos Principle (PC, PS4); Titan Souls (PC, PS4, Vita); Disney Interactive: Disney Infinity: Marvel Super Heroes (Android, iOS, PC, PS3, PS4, Vita, Wii U, X360, XBO); Fantasia: Music Evolved (X360, XBO); Double Fine Productions: Massive Chalice (PC, XBO); Electronic Arts: Battlefield Hardline (PC, PS3, PS4, X360, XBO); Dawngate (PC); Dragon Age: Inquisition (PC, PS3, PS4, X360, XBO); FIFA 15 (3DS, PC, PS3, PS4, Vita, Wii, X360, XBO); NHL 15 (PS3, PS4, X360, XBO); Shadow Realms (PC); The Sims 4 (PC); Star Wars: The Old Republic — Galactic Strongholds (PC); Titanfall: IMC Rising (PC, X360, XBO); Epic Games: Fortnite (PC); Excamedia: A Clumsy Adventure (PC, Vita); Firefly Studios: Stronghold Crusader II (PC); Flying Wild Hog: Juju (PC, PS3, PS4, X360, XBO); Focus Home Interactive: Act of Aggression (PC); Blood Bowl 2 (PC); Etherium (PC); Farming Simulator 15 (PC, PS3, PS4, X360, XBO); Mordheim: City of the Damned (PC); Sherlock Holmes: Crimes & Punishments (PC, PS3, PS4, X360, XBO); Styx: Master of Shadows (PC, PS4, XBO)	Frontier Developments: Elite: Dangerous (PC); Gaijin Entertainment: War Thunder (PC, PS4); Gateway Interactive: Spectra (Android, iOS, XBO); Grey Box: Grey Goo (PC); Grimm Bros: Dragon Fin Soup (PC, PS3, PS4, Vita); Halfbrick Studios: Fruit Ninja Kinect 2 (XBO); Headup Games: Space Engineers (PC, XBO); Hi-Rez Studios: Smite (XBO); Ironward: The Red Solstice (PC); Kalypso Media: Crookz (PC); Crowntakers (PC); Dungeons II (PC); Grand Ages: Medieval (PC); Mechs & Mercs: Black Talons (PC); Wings! Remastered (PC); Konami: Metal Gear Solid V: The Phantom Pain (PC, PS3, PS4, X360, XBO); Pro Evolution Soccer 2015 (PC, PS3, PS4, X360, XBO); Silent Hills (PS4); Mastertonic: Dream (PC); Microïds: Syberia III (PC, PS4, XBO); Microsoft: Below (PC, XBO); The Escapists (PC, PS4, XBO); Fable Legends (PC, XBO); Forza Horizon 2 (X360, XBO); Forza Motorsport 5 (XBO); Halo 5: Guardians (XBO); Halo: The Master Chief Collection (XBO); Killer Instinct (XBO); Nero (XBO); Ori and the Blind Forest (PC, X360, XBO); Project Spark (PC, XBO); Quantum Break (XBO); Rivals of Aether (XBO); Screamride (X360, XBO); Space Engineers (PC, XBO); Sunset Overdrive (XBO); Superhot (PC, XBO); Mojang: Minecraft: PlayStation 4 Edition (PS4); Minecraft: PlayStation Vita Edition (Vita); Ndemic Creations: Plague Inc: Evolved (PC, XBO); Nevernaut Games: SlashDash (PC, PS4, Wii U, XBO); Nintendo: Bayonetta (Wii U); Bayonetta 2 (Wii U); Captain Toad: Treasure Tracker (Wii U); Disney Magical World (3DS); Fantasy Life (3DS); Hyrule Warriors (Wii U); Mario Kart 8 (Wii U); Mario Party 10 (Wii U); Splatoon (Wii U); Super Smash Bros. for Nintendo 3DS (3DS); Super Smash Bros. for Wii U (Wii U); Yoshi's Woolly World (Wii U); Nordic Games: AquaNox: Deep Descent (PC); The Book of Unwritten Tales 2 (PC); The Guild 3 (PC); MX vs. ATV Supercross (PC, PS3, X360); Shadowrun Chronicles: Boston Lockdown (iOS, Ouya, PC); SpellForce 3 (PC); The Vanishing of Ethan Carter (PC, PS4); Other Ocean Interactive: #IDARB (XBO); Paradox Interactive: Cities: Skylines (PC); Hearts of Iron IV (PC); Hollowpoint (PC, PS4); Magicka 2 (PC, PS4); Pillars of Eternity (PC); Runemaster (PC, PS4); Phoenix Online Studios: Gabriel Knight: Sins of the Fathers 20th Anniversary Edition (PC); Playdead: Inside (XBO); Q-Games: Nom Nom Galaxy (PC, PS4, Vita); Riot Games: League of Legends (PC)	Sega: Alien: Isolation (PC, PS3, PS4, X360, XBO); Company of Heroes 2: Ardennes Assault (PC); Hatsune Miku: Project DIVA F 2nd (PS3, Vita); Sonic Boom: Rise of Lyric (Wii U); Sonic Boom: Shattered Crystal (3DS); SeithCG: Ghost of a Tale (PC, XBO); Sierra Entertainment: Geometry Wars 3: Dimensions (PC, PS3, PS4, X360, XBO); King's Quest (PC, PS3, PS4, X360, XBO); Slightly Mad Studios: Project CARS (PC, PS4, Wii U, XBO); World of Speed (PC); Sony Computer Entertainment: Alienation (PS4); Big Fest (Vita); Bloodborne (PS4); CounterSpy (PS3, PS4, Vita); Driveclub (PS4); Entwined (PS3, PS4, Vita); Final Horizon (PS4, Vita); Flame Over (Vita); Freedom Wars (Vita); Frozen Synapse Tactics (PS3, Vita); Futuridium EP Deluxe (PS4, Vita); Galak-Z: The Dimensional (PC, PS4); Hellblade (PC, PS4); Helldivers (PS3, PS4, Vita); Hohokum (PS3, PS4, Vita); Hustle Kings (PS3, PS4, Vita); Infamous First Light (PS4); Invizimals: The Alliance (Vita); Journey (PS4); Killzone Shadow Fall: Intercept (PS4); The Last of Us Remastered (PS4); LittleBigPlanet 3 (PS4); Murasaki Baby (Vita); The Order: 1886 (PS4); Pix the Cat (PC, PS4, Vita); PlayStation Vita Pets (Vita); Ratchet & Clank Collection (Vita); Rime (PS4); The Sly Collection (Vita); Soul Sacrifice Delta (Vita); Super Exploding Zoo (PS4, Vita); Tearaway Unfolded (PS4); The Tomorrow Children (PS4); The Unfinished Swan (PS4, Vita); Until Dawn (PS4); Volume (PC, PS4, Vita); Wild (PS4); Square Enix: Dragon Quest IV: Chapters of the Chosen (iOS, Android); Dragon Quest VIII: Journey of the Cursed King (iOS, Android); Final Fantasy XIV: A Realm Reborn (PS4); Kingdom Hearts HD 2.5 Remix (PS3); Lara Croft and the Temple of Osiris (PC, PS4, XBO); Life Is Strange (PC, PS3, PS4, X360, XBO); Nosgoth (PC); Rise of the Tomb Raider (X360, XBO); Theatrhythm Final Fantasy: Curtain Call (3DS); Starbreeze Studios: The Walking Dead (PC); Techland: Hellraid (PC, PS4, XBO); TinyBuild: Speed Runners (PC, XBO); Ubisoft: Assassin's Creed Rogue (PC, PS3, X360); Assassin's Creed Unity (PC, PS4, XBO); The Crew (PC, PS4, X360, XBO); Far Cry 4 (PC, PS3, PS4, X360, XBO); Just Dance 2015 (PS3, PS4, Wii, Wii U, X360, XBO); Just Dance Now (iOS, Android); Might & Magic Heroes VII (PC); The Settlers: Kingdoms of Anteria (PC); Shape Up (XBO); Tom Clancy's The Division (PC, PS4, XBO); Toy Soldiers: War Chest (PC, PS4, XBO); Vlambeer: Nuclear Throne (PS3, PS4, Vita, XBO); Wargaming: World of Tanks: Xbox 360 Edition (X360); World of Warplanes (PC); World of Warships (PC); Warner Bros.: Batman: Arkham Knight (PC, PS4, XBO); Dying Light (PC, PS4, XBO); Gauntlet (PC); Lego Batman 3: Beyond Gotham (3DS, PC, PS3, PS4, Vita, Wii U, X360, XBO); Lego Ninjago: Nindroids (3DS, Vita); Middle-earth: Shadow of Mordor (PC, PS3, PS4, X360, XBO); Mortal Kombat X (PC, PS3, PS4, X360, XBO); Witchbeam: Assault Android Cactus (PC, PS4, Vita, Wii U)

=== 2015 ===
Gamescom 2015 was held 5–9 August. 345,000 people attended that year's visit.

==== Exhibitors ====
2015 exhibitors
2K Games: Battleborn (PC, PS4, XBO); Evolve (PC, PS4, XBO); Mafia III (PC, PS4, XBO); NBA 2K16 (PC, PS3, PS4, X360, XBO); WWE 2K16 (PS3, PS4, X360, XBO); XCOM 2 (PC); 505 Games: Terraria (3DS, Wii U, PC, Xbox, PS3, PS3, PS4, Android, IOS); Studio Wildcard: Ark: Survival Evolved (PC, Xbox One, PS4); Abbey Games: Renowned Explorers: International Society (PC); Activision: Call of Duty: Black Ops III (PC, PS4, XBO); Destiny: The Taken King (PS3, PS4, X360, XBO); Guitar Hero Live (PS3, PS4, Wii U, X360, XBO); Tony Hawk's Pro Skater 5 (PS3, PS4, X360, XBO); Transformers: Devastation (PC, PS3, PS4, X360, XBO); Skylanders: SuperChargers (3DS, iOS, PS3, PS4, Wii, Wii U, X360, XBO); Amplitude Studios: Dungeon of the Endless (iOS, XBO); Endless Legend: Shadows (PC); Endless Space 2 (PC); Atari: RollerCoaster Tycoon World (PC); Bandai Namco Entertainment: Dark Souls III (PC, PS4, XBO); Naruto Shippuden: Ultimate Ninja Storm 4 (PC, PS4, XBO); Bethesda Softworks: Doom (PC, PS4, XBO); Fallout 4 (PC, PS4, XBO); Black Forest Games: Giana Sisters: Dream Runners (PC, PS4, Wii U, XBO); Blizzard Entertainment: Hearthstone: Heroes of Warcraft (PC); Heroes of the Storm (PC); Overwatch (PC); StarCraft II: Legacy of the Void (PC); World of Warcraft: Legion (PC); World of Warcraft: Warlords of Draenor (PC); Bohemia Interactive: ARMA 3 (PC); Capcom: Mega Man Legacy Collection (3DS, PC, PS4, XBO); Street Fighter V (PC, PS4); CI Games: Sniper: Ghost Warrior 3 (PC, PS4, XBO); Cloud Imperium Games: Star Citizen (PC); Crytek: Arena of Fate (PC); Warface (PC); Daedalic Entertainment: AER (PC, PS4, XBO); Bounty Train (PC); Caravan (PC); Fire (iOS); The Pillars of the Earth (iOS, PC, PS4, XBO); Project Daedalus: The Long Journey Home (PC); Silence: The Whispered World 2 (iOS, PC, PS4, XBO); Skyhill (OSX, PC); Valhalla Hills (OSX, PC); Deep Silver: Dead Island 2 (PC, PS4, XBO); Homefront: The Revolution (PC, PS4, XBO); Lost Horizon 2 (PC); Mighty No. 9 (3DS, PC, PS3, PS4, Vita, Wii U, X360, XBO); Devolver Digital: Dropsy (Android, iOS, PC); Eitr (PC, PS4); Enter the Gungeon (PC, PS4); Hatoful Boyfriend: Holiday Star (PC, PS4, Vita); Mother Russia Bleeds (PC, PS4); The Talos Principle (Android, PC, PS4); Digital Extremes: Sword Coast Legends (OSX, PC, PS4, XBO); Electronic Arts: FIFA 16 (Android, iOS, PC, PS3, PS4, X360, XBO); Mirror's Edge Catalyst (PC, PS4, XBO); Need for Speed (PC, PS4, XBO); Plants vs. Zombies: Garden Warfare 2 (PC, PS4, XBO); The Sims 4: Get Together (PC); Star Wars Battlefront (PC, PS4, XBO); Star Wars: The Old Republic – Knights of the Fallen Empire (PC); Unravel (PC, PS4, XBO); EuroVideo Medien: Victor Vran (PC); Focus Home Interactive: Act of Aggression (PC); Battlefleet Gothic: Armada (PC); Blood Bowl 2 (PC, PS4, XBO); Divinity: Original Sin Enhanced Edition (PC, PS4, XBO); Seasons After Fall (PC); The Surge (PC, PS4, XBO); The Technomancer (PC, PS4, XBO); Frontier Developments: Elite: Dangerous (PC, XBO); Elite: Horizons (PC); Grey Box: Dreadnought (PC); Headup Games: Typoman (Wii U); Hi-Rez Studios: Paladins (PC, PS4, XBO); HTC / Valve: HTC Vive; Iceberg Interactive: Inside My Radio (XBO); Into the Stars (PC); Oriental Empires (PC); Starpoint Gemini 2 (XBO); Starpoint Gemini Warlords (PC); Starship Corporation (PC); Image & Form: SteamWorld Heist (3DS, PC, PS4, Vita, Wii U, XBO); Intel: Skylake; Introversion Software: Prison Architect (Android, iOS, PC); Kalypso Media: Air Conflicts: Pacific Carriers (PS4); Crookz: The Big Heist (PC); Crowntakers (Android, iOS); Excubitor (PC); Grand Ages: Medieval (PC, PS4); Jump the Rope (Android, iOS); Wings! Remastered (Android, iOS)	KING Art: The Dwarves (PC, PS4, XBO); Koei Tecmo: Arslan: The Warrior of Legend (PS3, PS4, XBO); Attack on Titan (PS3, PS4, Vita); Nobunaga's Ambition: Sphere of Influence (PC, PS3, PS4); Samurai Warriors 4-II (PC, PS3, PS4, Vita); Konami: Metal Gear Solid V: The Phantom Pain (PC, PS3, PS4, X360, XBO); Pro Evolution Soccer 2016 (PC, PS3, PS4, X360, XBO); Mad Catz: Rock Band 4 (PS4, XBO); Microïds: Agatha Christie: The ABC Murders (Android, iOS, PC, PS4, XBO); Dungeon of Naheulbeuk (PC, PS4, XBO); Moto Racer 4 (PS4, XBO); Syberia III (iOS, Android, PC, PS4, XBO); Yesterday Origins (PC); Microsoft Studios: Cobalt (PC, X360, XBO); Crackdown 3 (XBO); Cuphead (PC, XBO); Forza Motorsport 6 (XBO); Halo 5: Guardians (XBO); Halo Wars 2 (PC, XBO); Killer Instinct Season Three (PC, XBO); Ori and the Blind Forest: Definitive Edition (PC, X360, XBO); Quantum Break (XBO); Scalebound (XBO); Train Simulator 2015 (XBO); Motiga: Gigantic (PC, XBO); NeocoreGames: Warhammer 40,000: Inquisitor – Martyr (PC, PS4, XBO); Ninja Theory: Hellblade (PC, PS4); Nintendo: Chibi-Robo!: Zip Lash (3DS); Devil's Third (PC, Wii U); Fatal Frame: Maiden of Black Water (Wii U); LBX: Little Battlers eXperience (3DS); Mario & Luigi: Paper Jam (3DS); Mario Kart 8 (Wii U); Mario Tennis: Ultra Smash (Wii U); Splatoon (Wii U); Star Fox Zero (Wii U); Super Mario Maker (Wii U); Super Smash Bros. for Nintendo 3DS (3DS); Super Smash Bros. for Wii U (Wii U); The Legend of Zelda: Tri Force Heroes (3DS); Xenoblade Chronicles X (Wii U); Nordic Games: The Book of Unwritten Tales 2 (PS4, XBO); Darksiders II: Deathinitive Edition (PS4, XBO); ELEX (PC, PS4, XBO); The Guild 3 (PC); Legend of Kay Anniversary (PC, PS3, PS4, Wii U, XB360); MX vs. ATV Supercross Encore (PC, PS4, XBO); SpellForce 3 (PC); Paradox Interactive: Cities: Skylines (PC, XBO); Cities Skylines – After Dark (PC); Hearts of Iron IV (PC); Pillars of Eternity: The White March – Part I (PC); Stellaris (PC); SCS Software: American Truck Simulator (PC); Sega: Total War: Arena (PC); Total War: Warhammer (PC); Shin'en Multimedia: Fast Racing Neo (Wii U); Slightly Mad Studios: Red Bull Air Race: The Game (PC); Sony: Horizon Zero Dawn (PS4); Project Morpheus (PS4); Tearaway Unfolded (PS4); Uncharted 4: A Thief's End (PS4); Uncharted: The Nathan Drake Collection (PS4); Until Dawn (PS4); Square Enix: Deus Ex: Mankind Divided (PC, PS4, XBO); Dragon Quest Heroes: The World Tree's Woe and the Blight Below (PS4); Final Fantasy Type-0 HD (PC); Final Fantasy XIV: Heavensward (PC, PS3); Final Fantasy XV (PS4, XBO); Final Fantasy XV Episode Duscae 2.0 (PS4, XBO); Hitman (PC, PS4, XBO); Just Cause 3 (PC, PS4, XBO); Lara Croft Go (Android, iOS); Life Is Strange (PC, PS3, PS4, X360, XBO); Nosgoth (PC); Rise of the Tomb Raider (PC, PS4, X360, XBO); TaleWorlds Entertainment: Mount & Blade II: Bannerlord (PC); Teotl Studios: The Solus Project (PC, XBO); Ubisoft: Anno 2205 (PC); Assassin's Creed Syndicate (PC, PS4, XBO); For Honor (PC, PS4, XBO); Just Dance 2016 (PS3, PS4, Wii, Wii U, X360, XBO); Might & Magic Heroes VII (PC); Rabbids VR Ride; The Crew: Wild Run (PC, PS4, XBO); Tom Clancy's The Division (PC, PS4, XBO); Tom Clancy's Rainbow Six Siege (PC, PS4, XBO); TrackMania Turbo (PC, PS4, XBO); Wargaming: Master of Orion: Conquer the Stars (PC); World of Tanks (PC); World of Tanks: Xbox One Edition (XBO); World of Tanks Blitz (Android, iOS); World of Warships (PC); Warhorse Studios: Kingdom Come: Deliverance (PC, PS4, XBO); Warner Bros.: Dying Light: The Following (PC, PS4, XBO); Lego Dimensions (PS3, PS4, Wii U, X360, XBO); Lego Marvel's Avengers (3DS, PC, PS3, PS4, Vita, Wii U, X360, XBO); Mad Max (PC, PS4, XBO); Yacht Club Games: Shovel Knight: Plague of Shadows (3DS, PC, PS3, PS4, Vita, Wii U, XBO)

=== 2016 ===
Gamescom 2016 was held 17–21 August. 345,000 people attended that year's visit.

==== Exhibitors ====
2016 exhibitors
Atari: RollerCoaster Tycoon World (PC); Bandai Namco Entertainment: Dragon Ball Xenoverse 2 (PC / PS4 / Xbox One); Tekken 7 (PC / PS4 / Xbox One); Little Nightmares (PC / PS4 / Xbox One); Blizzard Entertainment: Heroes of the Storm; Overwatch; World of Warcraft: Legion; Focus Home Interactive: Farming Simulator 17 (PC / PS4 / Xbox One); Seasons After Fall (PC / PS4 / Xbox One); Shiness: The Lightning Kingdom (TBA); Space Hulk: Deathwing (PC / PS4 / Xbox One); The Surge (PC / PS4 / Xbox One); Styx: Shards of Darkness (PC / PS4 / Xbox One); Vampyr (PC / PS4 / Xbox One); Frontier Developments: Elite: Dangerous (PC / OS X / Xbox One); Planet Coaster (PC); Gaijin Entertainment: Crossout (PC / PS4 / Xbox One); War Thunder (PC / PS4 / Xbox One); Konami: Metal Gear Survive (2017); Pro Evolution Soccer 2017 (PC / PS4 / Xbox One / PS3 / Xbox 360); Microsoft Studios: Cuphead (PC / Xbox One); Everspace (PC / Xbox One); Gears of War 4 (PC / Xbox One); Halo Wars 2 (PC / Xbox One); ReCore (PC / Xbox One); Sea of Thieves (PC / Xbox One); We Happy Few (PC / Xbox One)	Nintendo: Axiom Verge (3DS / Switch / Wii U); Azure Striker Gunvolt 2 (3DS); Dragon Quest VII: Fragments of the Forgotten Past (3DS); Fast Racing Neo (Wii U); Jotun: Valhalla Edition (Wii U); Mario Party: Star Rush (3DS); Monster Hunter Generations (3DS); Phoenix Wright: Ace Attorney − Spirit of Justice (3DS / Android / iOS); Pirate Pop Plus (3DS); Rhythm Paradise Megamix (3DS); Runbow Pocket (3DS); Severed (3DS / Switch / Wii U); Sonic Boom: Fire & Ice (3DS); SteamWorld Heist (3DS / Wii U); Super Meat Boy (Switch / Wii U); World to the West (Wii U); Green Man Gaming: Of Kings And Men (PC); Lifeless (PC); The Black Death (PC); The Bunker (PC); Warner Bros. Interactive Entertainment: Batman Arkham VR (PSVR); Injustice 2 (PS4 / Xbox One)

=== 2017 ===
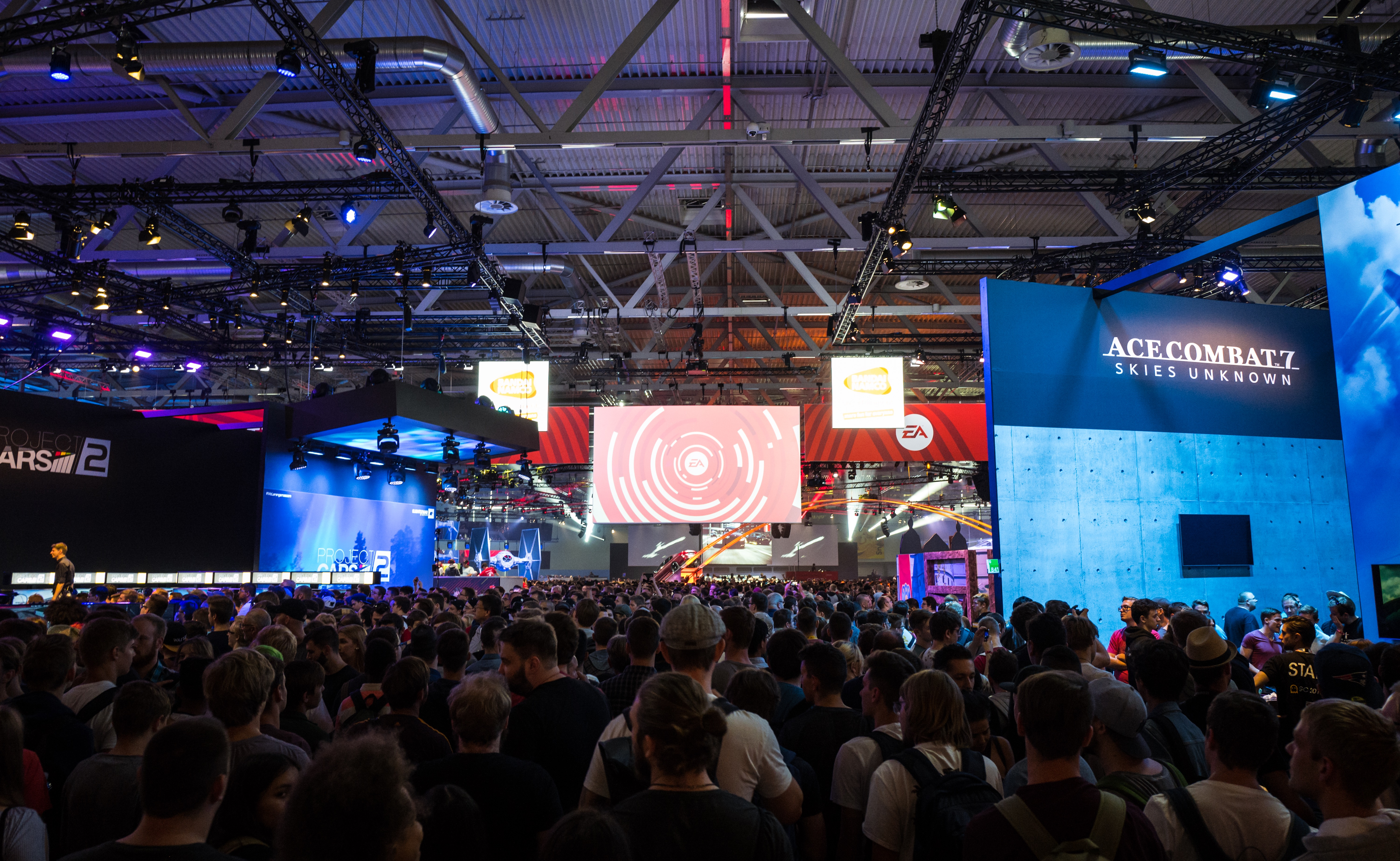
Various exhibition stands in one of the exhibition halls in 2017

Gamescom 2017 was held 22–26 August. 355,000 people attended that year's visit.

==== Notable events ====
- German Chancellor Angela Merkel opened the event, which marked the first time in history that a Gamescom was opened by a sitting Chancellor.
- BMW and Electronic Arts unveiled the newest generation BMW M5 to promote the launch of Need for Speed Payback.

==== Exhibitors ====
2017 exhibitors
Activision: Call of Duty: WWII (PC / PS4 / Xbox One); Destiny 2 (PC / PS4 / Xbox One); Bandai Namco Entertainment: Ace Combat 7: Skies Unknown (PC / PS4 / Xbox One); Dragon Ball FighterZ (PC/ PS4 / Xbox One); Little Nightmares (PC / PS4 / Xbox One); Ni no Kuni II: Revenant Kingdom (PC / PS4); Naruto to Boruto: Shinobi Striker (PC / PS4 / Xbox One); Naruto x Boruto: Ninja Voltage (Android / iOS); Project CARS 2 (PC / PS4 / Xbox One); Bethesda Softworks: The Evil Within 2 (PC / PS4 / Xbox One); Wolfenstein II: The New Colossus (Nintendo Switch / PC / PS4 / Xbox One); Capcom: Monster Hunter: World (PC / PS4 / Xbox One); CD Projekt: Gwent: Thronebreaker (PC / PS4 / Xbox One); Colossal Order: Cities: Skylines (PC / PS4 / Xbox One); Devolver Digital: Ruiner (PC / PS4 / Xbox One); Electronic Arts: Battlefield 1 (PC / PS4 / Xbox One); Fe (Nintendo Switch / PC / PS4 / Xbox One); FIFA 18 (Nintendo Switch / PC / PS3 / PS4 / Xbox 360 / Xbox One); Need for Speed Payback (PC / PS4 / Xbox One); Star Wars Battlefront II (PC / PS4 / Xbox One); The Sims 4 (PC / PS4 / Xbox One); Frontier Developments: Jurassic World Evolution (PC / PS4 / Xbox One); Kalypso Media: Tropico 6 (PC / PS4 / Xbox One)	Konami: Metal Gear Survive (PC / PS4 / Xbox One); Pro Evolution Soccer 2018 (PC / PS3 / PS4 / Xbox 360 / Xbox One); Microsoft Studios: Age of Empires IV (PC); PlayerUnknown's Battlegrounds (PC / Xbox One); Sea of Thieves (PC / Xbox One); Nintendo: Fire Emblem Warriors (New Nintendo 3DS / Nintendo Switch); Metroid: Samus Returns (Nintendo 3DS); Super Mario Odyssey (Nintendo Switch); Xenoblade Chronicles 2 (Nintendo Switch); Sega: Sonic Forces (Nintendo Switch / PC / PS4 / Xbox One); Sony: Detroit: Become Human (PS4); Gran Turismo Sport (PS4); Shenmue III (PC / PS4); Uncharted: The Lost Legacy (PS4); Square Enix: Fear Effect Reinvented (Nintendo Switch / PC / PS4 / Xbox One); Final Fantasy XV (PC); Life Is Strange: Before the Storm (PC / PS4 / Xbox One); THQ Nordic: Biomutant (PC / PS4 / Xbox One); Ubisoft: Anno 1800 (PC); Assassin's Creed Origins (PC / PS4 / Xbox One); Far Cry 5 (PC / PS4 / Xbox One); Just Dance 2018 (Nintendo Switch / PC / PS3 / PS4 / Xbox 360 / Xbox One / Wii U); Mario + Rabbids Kingdom Battle (Nintendo Switch); South Park: The Fractured but Whole (PC / PS4 / Xbox One); The Crew 2 (PC / PS4 / Xbox One); Warner Bros. Interactive Entertainment: Middle-earth: Shadow of War (Android / iOS / PC / PS4 / Xbox One)

=== 2018 ===
Gamescom 2018 was held 21–25 August. 370,000 people attended that year's visit.

==== Notable events ====
- Nvidia announced the GeForce RTX 20 Series at the Palladium Cologne on 20 August 2018.

==== Exhibitors ====
2018 exhibitors
505 Games: Assetto Corsa Competizione (PC); Control (PC / PS4 / Xbox One); Underworld Ascendant (PS4 / Switch / Xbox One); Activision: Call of Duty: Black Ops 4 (PC / PS4 / Xbox One); Destiny 2: Forsaken (PC / PS4 / Xbox One); Sekiro: Shadows Die Twice (PC / PS4 / Xbox One); Spyro Reignited Trilogy (PS4 / Xbox One); Atlus: Persona 3: Dancing in Moonlight (PS4 / Vita); Persona 5: Dancing in Starlight (PS4 / Vita); Bandai Namco Entertainment: 11-11: Memories Retold (PC / PS4 / Xbox One); Ace Combat 7: Skies Unknown (PC / PS4 / Xbox One); Bless Unleashed (Xbox One); Code Vein (PC / PS4 / Xbox One); The Dark Pictures: Man of Medan (PC / PS4 / Xbox One); Dark Souls: Remastered (Switch); Dragon Ball FighterZ (Switch); Jump Force (PC / PS4 / Xbox One); My Hero: One's Justice (PC / PS4 / Switch / Xbox One); One Piece: World Seeker (PC / PS4 / Xbox One); Soulcalibur VI (PC / PS4 / Xbox One); Twin Mirror (PC / PS4 / Xbox One); Bethesda: The Elder Scrolls: Blades (Android / iOS / PC); The Elder Scrolls Online: Summerset (PC / PS4 / Xbox One); Fallout 76 (PC / PS4 / Xbox One); Rage 2 (PC / PS4 / Xbox One); Wolfenstein: Cyberpilot (PC / PS4); Bigben Interactive: The Sinking City (PC / PS4 / Xbox One); Blizzard: Diablo III: Eternal Collection (Switch); Hearthstone (Android / iOS / PC); Heroes of the Storm (PC); Overwatch (PC / PS4); StarCraft II (PC); World of Warcraft: Battle for Azeroth (PC); Buka Entertainment: 9 Monkeys of Shaolin (PC / PS4 / Switch / Xbox One); Redeemer (PC / PS4 / Switch / Xbox One); Capcom: Devil May Cry 5 (PC / PS4 / Xbox One); Resident Evil 2 (PC / PS4 / Xbox One); CD Projekt: Cyberpunk 2077 (PC / PS4 / Xbox One); Crytek: Hunt: Showdown (PC / PS4 / Xbox One); Daedalic Entertainment: Edna & Harvey: The Breakout – 10th Anniversary (PC); State of Mind (PC); Witch It (PC); Deep Silver: Metro Exodus (PC / PS4 / Xbox One); Saints Row: The Third (Switch); Shenmue III (PC / PS4); Electronic Arts: Anthem (PC / PS4 / Xbox One); Battlefield V (PC / PS4 / Xbox One); FIFA 19 (PC / PS3 / PS4 / Switch / Xbox 360 / Xbox One); Epic Games: Fortnite (PC / PS4 / Xbox One / Switch); Focus Home Interactive: Battlefleet Gothic: Armada 2 (PC); Call of Cthulhu (PC / PS4 / Xbox One); Farming Simulator 19 (PC / PS4 / Xbox One); Fear the Wolves (PC / PS4 / Xbox One); Insurgency: Sandstorm (PC / PS4 / Xbox One); A Plague Tale: Innocence (PC / PS4 / Xbox One); Space Hulk: Tactics (PC / PS4 / Xbox One); The Surge 2 (PC / PS4 / Xbox One); Funcom: Mutant Year Zero: Road to Eden (PC / PS4 / Xbox One); Housemarque: Stormdivers (PC); Konami: Hyper Sports R (Switch); Pro Evolution Soccer 2019 (PC / PS4 / Xbox One); Yu-Gi-Oh! Duel Links (iOS / Android); Zone of the Enders: The 2nd Runner MARS (PC / PS4)	Microids: Blacksad: Under the Skin (PC / PS4 / Switch / Xbox One); Microsoft: Disneyland Adventures (PC); Forza Horizon 4 (PC / Xbox One); Sea of Thieves (PC / Xbox One); State of Decay 2 (PC / Xbox One); Ori and the Will of the Wisps (PC / Xbox One); ReCore: Definitive Edition (PC); Rush: A Disney-Pixar Adventure (PC); Super Lucky's Tale (PC / Xbox One); Zoo Tycoon: Ultimate Animal Collection (PC); Modus Games: Ary and the Secret of Seasons (PC / PS4 / Switch / Xbox One); Nintendo: Daemon X Machina (Switch); Luigi's Mansion (3DS); Mario Tennis Aces (Switch); Pokémon: Let's Go, Pikachu! and Let's Go, Eevee! (Switch); Super Mario Party (Switch); Super Smash Bros. Ultimate (Switch); Xenoblade Chronicles 2: Torna – The Golden Country (Switch); Perfect World Entertainment: Torchlight Frontiers (PC / PS4 / Xbox One); Playdius: AWAY: Journey to the Unexpected (PC / PS4 / Switch / Xbox One); Chroniric (iOS / Android); The Dungeon of Naheulbeuk: The Amulet of Chaos (PC / PS4 / Xbox One); Edge of Eternity (PC / PS4 / Xbox One); Hover (PC / PS4 / Switch / Xbox One); Old School Musical (Switch / PC); Spitkiss (iOS / Android); STAY (iOS / Android); Saber Interactive: MudRunner 2 (PC / PS4 / Xbox One); World War Z (PC / PS4 / Xbox One); Sega: Fist of the North Star: Lost Paradise (PS4); Football Manager 2019 (PC); Team Sonic Racing (PC / PS4 / Switch / Xbox One); Total War: Three Kingdoms (PC); Valkyria Chronicles 4 (PC / PS4 / Switch / Xbox One); Soedesco: 8-Bit Armies (PC / PS4 / Switch / Xbox One); Air Missions: HIND (PS4); Monstrum (PS4 / Xbox One); Omen of Sorrow (PS4); Owlboy (PS4 / Switch / Xbox One); Truck Driver (PC / PS4 / Xbox One); Unannounced title (Switch); Unannounced title (Switch); Sony: Spider-Man (PS4); Square Enix: Dragon Quest XI: Echoes of an Elusive Age (PC / PS4); Final Fantasy XIV (PC / PS4); Just Cause 4 (PC / PS4 / Xbox One); Kingdom Hearts III (PS4 / Xbox One); Life Is Strange 2 (PC / PS4 / Xbox One); Shadow of the Tomb Raider (PC / PS4 / Xbox One); THQ Nordic: Biomutant (PC / PS4 / Xbox One); Darksiders III (PC / PS4 / Xbox One); Desperados III (PC / PS4 / Xbox One); Fade to Silence (PC / PS4 / Xbox One); Generation Zero (PC / PS4 / Xbox One); Scarf (PC); Townsmen VR (HTC Vive / Oculus Rift / PC / Steam VR); Wreckfest (PC / PS4 / Xbox One); Ubisoft: Anno 1800 (PC); Assassin's Creed Odyssey (PC / PS4 / Switch / Xbox One); Brawlhalla (Switch / Xbox One); For Honor: Marching Fire (PC / PS4 / Xbox One); The Settlers (PC); The Settlers History Collection (PC); Starlink: Battle for Atlas (PS4 / Switch / Xbox One); Tom Clancy's The Division 2 (PC / PS4 / Xbox One); Transference (PC / PS4 / Xbox One); Trials Rising (PC / PS4 / Switch / Xbox One)

=== 2019 ===
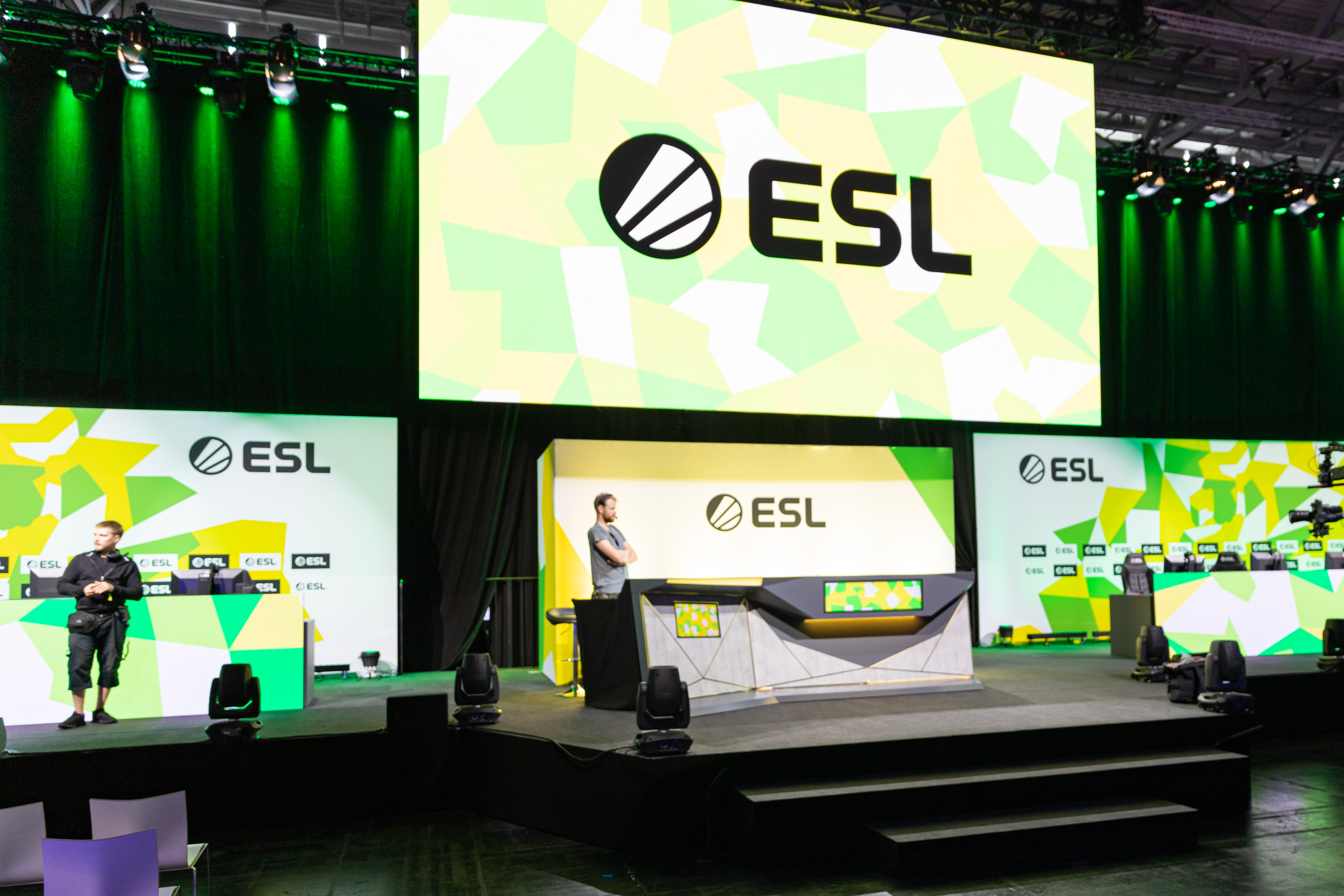
The stage of ESL in 2019

Gamescom 2019 was held 20–24 August. Geoff Keighley has announced that he will help launch a dedicated video game announcement show prior to Gamescom, called "Gamescom: Opening Night Live". Inspired by the response to The Game Awards presentation that includes several new game announcements, Keighley wanted to do the same for Gamescom. The event was streamed on 19 August at 8:00pm (CEST).

==== Exhibitors ====
2019 exhibitors
2K: Borderlands 3 (PC / PS4 / Xbox One); NBA 2K20 (PC / PS4 / Switch / Xbox One); 2x2 Games: Unity of Command 2 (PC); 505 Games: Control (PC / PS4 / Xbox One); Activision: Call of Duty: Modern Warfare (PC / PS4 / Xbox One); Spyro Reignited Trilogy (PC / Switch); All In! Games: Red Wings: Aces of the Sky (PC / PS4 / Switch / Xbox One); Atlus: Catherine: Full Body (PS4); Bandai Namco Entertainment: Code Vein (PC / PS4 / Xbox One); The Dark Pictures: Man of Medan (PC / PS4 / Xbox One); Dragon Ball Z: Kakarot (PC / PS4 / Xbox One); Little Nightmares II (PC / PS4 / Switch / Xbox One); One Piece: Pirate Warriors 4 (PC / PS4 / Switch / Xbox One); One-Punch Man: A Hero Nobody Knows (PC / PS4 / Xbox One); Tokyo Ghoul: re Call to Exist (PC / PS4); Behaviour Interactive: Dead by Daylight (PC / PS4 / Switch / Xbox One); Bethesda: Doom Eternal (PC / PS4 / Switch / Xbox One); Bigben Interactive: Bee Simulator (PC / PS4 / Switch / Xbox One); Overpass (PC / PS4 / Switch / Xbox One); Bloober Team: Blair Witch (PC / Xbox One); Bohemia Interactive: Vigor (Xbox One); Bungie: Destiny 2 (PC / PS4 / Xbox One); Capcom: Monster Hunter: World (PC / PS4 / Xbox One); CD Projekt: Cyberpunk 2077 (PC / PS4 / Xbox One); The Witcher 3: Wild Hunt (Switch); Crytek: Hunt: Showdown (PC / PS4 / Xbox One); Dear Villagers: ScourgeBringer (PC); Deep Silver: Iron Harvest 1920+ (PC / PS4 / Xbox One); Metro Exodus (PC / PS4 / Xbox One); Shenmue III (PC / PS4); Electronic Arts: Apex Legends (PC / PS4 / Xbox One); FIFA 20 (PC / PS4 / Switch / Xbox One); Need for Speed Heat (PC / PS4 / Xbox One); Fabraz: Skellboy (PC / Switch); The Farm 51: Chernobylite (PC / PS4 / Xbox One); Focus Home Interactive: Farming Simulator 19: Platinum Edition (PC / PS4 / Xbox One); GreedFall (PC / PS4 / Xbox One); SnowRunner (PC / PS4 / Xbox One); The Surge 2 (PC / PS4 / Xbox One); Warhammer 40K: Space Marine 2 (PS5 / Xbox Series X & S / PC); Forever Entertainment: Panzer Dragoon (Switch); Frecle: Youropa (PC / Switch); Frontier Developments: Planet Zoo (PC); Gameforge: Kingdom Under Fire II (PC / PS4); Gwen Frey: KINE (PC / PS4 / Switch / Xbox One); Intrepid Studios: Ashes of Creation (PC); Kakao Games: Black Desert Online (PC / PS4 / Xbox One); Kalypso Media: Port Royale 4 (PC / PS4 / Switch / Xbox One); Kasedo Games: Warhammer 40,000: Mechanicus (PS4 / Xbox One); Konami: Contra: Rogue Corps (PC / PS4 / Switch / Xbox One); eFootball Pro Evolution Soccer 2020 (PC / PS4 / Xbox One); Yu-Gi-Oh! Legacy of the Duelist: Link Evolution (Switch); Level-5: Layton's Mystery Journey: Katrielle and the Millionaires' Conspiracy – Deluxe Edition (Switch); Lionbite Games: Rain of Reflections (PC)	Microids: Asterix & Obelix XXL 3: The Crystal Menhir (PC / PS4 / Switch / Xbox One); Blacksad: Under the Skin (PC / PS4 / Switch / Xbox One); XIII (PC / PS4 / Switch / Xbox One); Modus Games: Ary and the Secret of Seasons (PC / PS4 / Switch / Xbox One); Cris Tales (PC / PS4 / Switch / Xbox One); Remothered: Broken Porcelain (PC / PS4 / Switch / Xbox One); Rock of Ages III: Make & Break (PC / PS4 / Switch / Xbox One); Trine 4: The Nightmare Prince (PC / PS4 / Switch / Xbox One); Nintendo: Astral Chain (Switch); Daemon X Machina (Switch); The Legend of Zelda: Link's Awakening (Switch); Luigi's Mansion 3 (Switch); Marvel Ultimate Alliance 3: The Black Order (Switch); Pokémon Sword and Shield (Switch); Splatoon 2 (Switch); Super Smash Bros. Ultimate (Switch); NIS America: The Legend of Heroes: Trails of Cold Steel III (PS4); Oddworld Inhabitants: Oddworld: Soulstorm (PC / PS4 / Xbox One); Paradox Interactive: Empire of Sin (PC / PS4 / Switch / Xbox One); Piranha Games: MechWarrior 5: Mercenaries (PC); Private Division: Kerbal Space Program 2 (PC / PS4 / Xbox One); PUBG Corporation: PlayerUnknown's Battlegrounds (PC / PS4 / Xbox One); Raw Fury: Atomicrops (PC / PS4 / Switch / Xbox One); Star Renegades (PC / PS4 / Switch / Xbox One); Robot Entertainment: Orcs Must Die! 3 (PC / PS4 / Xbox One); Rockfish Games: Everspace 2 (PC / PS4 / Switch / Xbox One); Saber Interactive: Ghostbusters: The Video Game Remastered (PC / PS4 / Switch / Xbox One); Sega: Humankind (PC); Mario & Sonic at the Olympic Games Tokyo 2020 (Arcade / Switch); Two Point Hospital (PC / PS4 / Switch / Xbox One); The Yakuza Remastered Collection (PS4); Shin'en Multimedia: The Touryst (Switch); Sony: Death Stranding (PS4); Predator: Hunting Grounds (PS4); Square Enix: Avengers (PC / PS4 / Xbox One); Dragon Quest XI S: Echoes of an Elusive Age – Definitive Edition (Switch); Final Fantasy VIII Remastered (PC / PS4 / Switch / Xbox One); Trials of Mana (PC / PS4 / Switch); Surgical Scalpels: Boundary (PC / PS4); TaleWorlds Entertainment: Mount & Blade II: Bannerlord (PC); Team17: Blasphemous (PC / PS4 / Xbox One); Tencent Next Studios: Synced Off Planets (PC); The Astronauts: Witchfire (PC); THQ Nordic: Biomutant (PC / PS4 / Xbox One); Comanche (PC); Darksiders Genesis (PC / PS4 / Switch / Xbox One); Desperados III (PC / PS4 / Xbox One); Destroy All Humans! (PC / PS4 / Xbox One); DCL: The Game (PC / PS4 / Xbox One); El Hijo (PC / PS4 / Switch / Xbox One); Knights of Honor II: Sovereign (PC); Monkey King: Hero Is Back (PC / PS4); One Hand Clapping (PS4); SpongeBob SquarePants: Battle for Bikini Bottom – Rehydrated (PC / PS4 / Switch / Xbox One); Spitlings (PC / PS4 / Switch / Xbox One); Through the Darkest of Times (PC); Triband: What the Golf? (PC / Switch); Typhoon Studios: Journey to the Savage Planet (PC / PS4 / Xbox One); Ubisoft: Anno 1800 (PC); Tom Clancy's Ghost Recon Breakpoint (PC / PS4 / Xbox One); The Settlers (PC); Trials Rising (PC / PS4 / Switch / Xbox One); Watch Dogs: Legion (PC / PS4 / Xbox One); V1 Interactive: Disintegration (PC / PS4 / Xbox One); Wargaming: World of Warships (PC / PS4 / Xbox One); WB Games: Mortal Kombat 11 (PC / PS4 / Switch / Xbox One); Wizards of the Coast: Magic: The Gathering Arena (PC); Xbox Game Studios: Age of Empires II: Definitive Edition (PC / Xbox One); Battletoads (PC / Xbox One); Bleeding Edge (PC / Xbox One); Gears 5 (PC / Xbox One); Halo: The Master Chief Collection (PC); Minecraft Dungeons (PC / PS4 / Switch / Xbox One); Wasteland 3 (PC / PS4 / Xbox One); YAGER: The Cycle (PC)

=== 2020 ===
Gamescom 2020 was scheduled to be held from 25 to 29 August in Cologne. However, Germany announced that following lifting of lockdowns in the wake of the COVID-19 pandemic, all public events through August 2020 were banned. Gamescom organizers announced they would move some portions of the planned show online. Organizers confirmed plans for the online Opening Night Live to start on 27 August, with each following day through 30 August featuring a schedule of online developer interviews and events and a wrap-up show.

==== Exhibitors ====
2020 exhibitors

Nacon

- Hell Is Us (PS5 / Xbox Series X / PC)
- Werewolf: The Apocalypse – Earthblood (PS5 / PS4 / Xbox Series X / Xbox One / PC)

Next Studios

- Synced Off Planet (PC)

Neowiz

- Lies Of P (PS5 / Xbox Series X / PC)

Nintendo

- Pokémon Legends: Arceus (Switch)
- Splatoon 3 (Switch)

Phoenix Labs

- Dauntless (PS4 / PS5 / PC / Xbox Series X / Xbox One / Switch)

Raw Fury

- Sable (PC)

Riot Games

- League Of Legends (PC)
- Valorant (PC)

Sega

- Endless Dungeon (Switch / PS4 / PS5 / Xbox Series X / Xbox One / PC)
- Humankind (PC)
- Hyenas (PS4 /PS5 / Xbox Series X / Xbox One /PC)

Sloclap

- Sifu (PC / PS4 / PS5)

Sony

- God of War Ragnarök (PS5)
- Horizon Forbidden West (PS5 / PS4)

Square Enix

- Dragon Quest XI S: Echoes Of Elusive Age (Xbox One / Xbox Series X / PS4)
- Forspoken (PS5)

Ubisoft

- Just Dance 2021 (PS4 / Switch / Xbox One / Stadia / PS5 / Xbox Series X)
- Untitled Just Dance 4 + Just Dance 2019 collection (PS4 / Switch / Xbox One / Stadia / PS5 / Xbox Series X)

Warner Bros. Games

- Lego Star Wars: The Skywalker Saga (PS5 / PS4 / Xbox Series X / Xbox One / Switch)

=== 2021 ===
Gamescom 2021 was held 25–27 August 2021. The event was preceded by Opening Night Live with Geoff Keighley on 25 August. Gamescom 2021 was a hybrid exhibition experience with online and live events.

==== Exhibitors ====
2021 exhibitors

=== 2022 ===
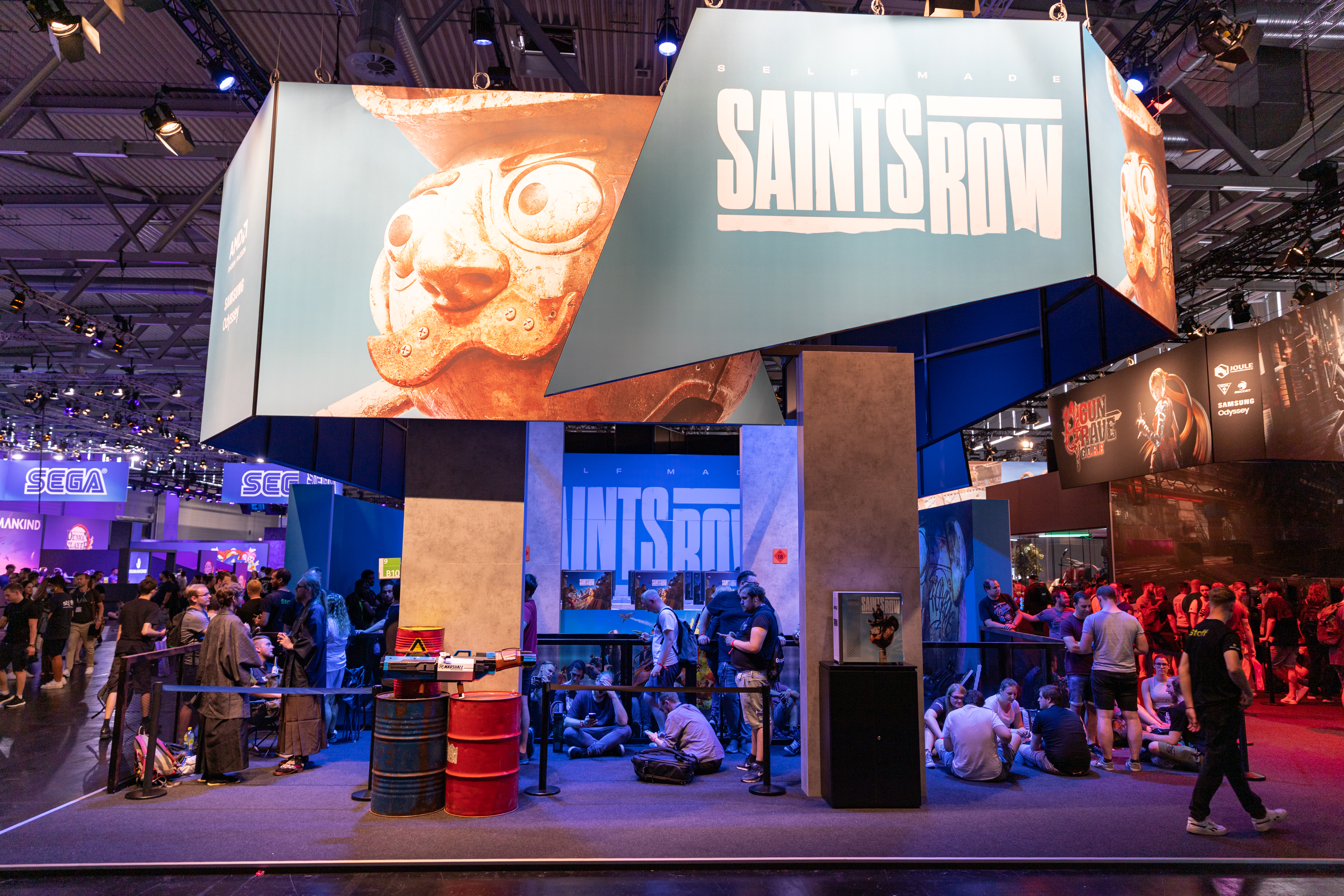
The booth of Saints Row in 2022

Gamescom 2022 was held 24–28 August 2022. The event was both in-person and online. 265,000 people attended that year's visit.

==== Exhibitors ====
2022 exhibitors

2K Games

- New Tales from the Borderlands

All in! Games

- Phantom Hellcat

Assemble Entertainment

- Fall of Porcupine

Bandai Namco Entertainment

- Park Beyond
- The Dark Pictures Anthology: The Devil in Me

Build a Rocket Boy

- Everywhere

CI Games

- The Lords of the Fallen

Coffee Stain Studios

- Goat Simulator 3

Deep Silver

- Dead Island 2

Devolver Digital

- Return to Monkey Island

Embark Studios

- The Finals

Everstone Studios

- Where Winds Meet

Fatshark

- Warhammer 40,000: Darktide

Focus Entertainment

- Atlas Fallen
- Blacktail

Frontier Foundry

- Stranded: Alien Dawn

Funcom

- Dune Awakening

Gearbox Publishing

- Homeworld 3

Good Shepherd Entertainment

- Killer Klowns from Outer Space: The Game

Kalypso Media

- Tortuga: A Pirate's Tale

Krafton

- The Callisto Protocol
- Moonbreaker

Lucid Dreams Studio

- Biomorph

HoYoverse

- Honkai: Star Rail

Neowiz

- Lies Of P

Prime Matter

- Scars Above

Quantic Dream

- Under the Waves

Raw Fury

- Friends vs Friends

Red Barrels

- The Outlast Trials

Sega

- Sonic Frontiers

Something Wicked Games

- Wyrdsong

Squanch Games

- High on Life

Team17

- Marauders
- Moving Out 2

Telltale Games

- The Expanse: A Telltale Series

Warner Bros. Games

- Gotham Knights
- Hogwarts Legacy

=== 2023 ===
Gamescom 2023 was held 23–27 August 2023. 320,000 people attended that year's visit. The opening night received media attention after one attendee rushed on the stage and interrupting presenter of the show Geoff Keighley, saying that "Bill Clinton wants to play GTA VI". The incident occurred 8 months after a similar incident at The Game Awards 2022, in which Keighley also hosted. The same attendee also interrupted several live shows in Germany, asking about the game.

==== Exhibitors ====
2023 exhibitors

Activision

- Call of Duty: Modern Warfare III

Bandai Namco Entertainment

- Armored Core VI: Fires of Rubicon
- Little Nightmares III
- Tekken 8

Bethesda Publishing

- Starfield

Blizzard Entertainment

- Diablo IV: Season 2

CD Projekt

- Cyberpunk 2077 (DLC)

CI Games

- Lords of the Fallen

Cygames

- Granblue Fantasy: Relink

Dear Villagers

- Fort Solis

Deep Silver

- Payday 3

Devolver Digital

- The Plucky Squire
- The Talos Principle 2

Epic Games Publishing

- Alan Wake II

Focus Entertainment

- Expeditions: A MudRunner Game

Frontier Developments

- Warhammer: Age of Sigmar - Realms of Ruin

Frost Giant Games

- Stormgate

Game Science

- Black Myth: Wukong

Gearbox Publishing

- Homeworld 3

GSC Game World

- S.T.A.L.K.E.R. 2: Heart of Chornobyl

HoYoverse

- Genshin Impact
- Honkai: Star Rail
- Zenless Zone Zero

Humble Games

- Bō: Path of the Teal Lotus

Inflexion Games

- Nightingale

Lost Native

- Wild Country

Marvelous Europe

- Mandragora

Neowiz Games

- Lies of P

Nexon

- Medieval Fighter Warhaven

Nuverse

- Marvel Snap

Panic Inc.

- Thank Goodness You're Here

Pearl Abyss

- Crimson Desert

People Can Fly

- Bulletstorm

Quantic Dream

- Dustborn

Sega

- Sonic Frontiers (DLC)
- Sonic Superstars

TiMi Studio Group

- Delta Force

Tripwire Interactive

- Killing Floor 3

Ubisoft

- Assassin's Creed Mirage
- The Crew Motorfest

Warner Bros. Games

- Mortal Kombat 1

Wired Productions

- Bulwark: Falconeer Chronicles
- Gori: Cuddly Carnage

Xbox Game Studios

- Age of Empires IV: Anniversary Edition
- Ara: History Untold

=== 2024 ===
Gamescom 2024 was held 21–25 August 2024. The event attracted more than 335,000 visitors and 1,400 exhibitors on that year.

==== Exhibitors ====
2024 exhibitors

22cans

- Masters of Albion

2K

- Borderlands 4
- Civilization VII

Activision

- Call of Duty: Black Ops 6

Amazing Seasun Games

- Mecha Break

Amazon Games

- King of Meat

Bethesda Softworks

- Starfield: Shattered Space

Bandai Namco Entertainment

- Dragon Ball: Sparking! Zero
- Little Nightmares III

Capcom

- Monster Hunter Wilds

Coffee Stain Studios

- Goat Simulator: Remastered

Deep Silver

- Kingdom Come: Deliverance II

Don't Nod

- Lost Records: Bloom & Rage

Dreamhaven

- Lynked: Banner of the Spark

Embark Studios

- ARC Raiders

Focus Entertainment

- Warhammer 40,000: Space Marine 2

Frontier Developments

- Planet Coaster 2

Funcom

- Dune: Awakening

Grinding Gear Games

- Path of Exile 2

MiHoYo

- Genshin Impact

NetEase Games

- Marvel Rivals

Netflix Games

- Monument Valley 3

Oculus Studios

- Batman: Arkham Shadow

Papergames

- Infinity Nikki

SNK

- Fatal Fury: City of the Wolves

Techland

- Dying Light: The Beast

THQ Nordic

- Reanimal

Torn Banner Studios

- No More Room in Hell 2

Xbox Game Studios

- Age of Mythology: Retold
- Towerborne

=== 2025 ===
Gamescom 2025 was held 20–24 August 2025. The event attracted more than 357,000 visitors and 1,500 exhibitors that year.

==== Exhibitors ====
2025 exhibitors

Team Cherry

- Hollow Knight: Silksong

=== 2026 ===
Gamescom 2026 was held 26–30 August under the slogan "Games whet the appetite for the future". It was expected to attract over 350,000 visitors and set a new exhibitor record. German President Frank-Walter Steinmeier became the first German president to visit Gamescom, while EU Vice-President Henna Virkkunen attended to discuss the EU's games strategy. Germany's games market generated €9.4 billion in 2025, making it Europe's largest and the world's fifth-largest. In the first half of 2026, revenue fell 3% to €4.2 billion, partly due to declining hardware sales and rising component costs. During the last days of the event, laptops belonging to indie developers were stolen.

==== Exhibitors ====
2026 exhibitors

== Game Developers Conference Europe ==
From 2009 to 2016, the Game Developers Conference Europe (GDC Europe), a European spinoff of the Game Developers Conference, has been held in conjunction with the Gamescom. The Conference took place at the Cologne Congress Centre East.

== Offshoots ==
An offshoot of the trade fair has been established for the Asian region in 2021 under the name Gamescom Asia and takes place in Singapore. In 2025 Gamescom Asia joins forces with Thailand Game Show and takes place in Bangkok. In 2023, Koelnmesse closed an agreement with BIG Festival and Omelete Company for a new offshoot under the name Gamescom Latam, which takes place in Brazil.

== See also ==
- EGX (expo)
- Electronic Entertainment Expo
- PAX (event)
- Brasil Game Show
- Gamercom
- Game Developers Conference
- Games Convention
- Asia Game Show
- Paris Games Week
- Tokyo Game Show
- IgroMir
- Video gaming in Germany
