= Navy Field 2 =

2014 video game

- Developer: SDEnterNET
- Publishers: GamenGame, Nexon
- Engine: Gamebryo
- Platforms: Windows 2000, XP, Vista, 7
- Release: June 25, 2014 (Korean Release) August 11, 2014 (SEA Release) December 4, 2014 (Global Release)
- Genre: MMO-action
- Mode: MMO

Navy Field 2 is the second game of the Navy Field franchise, developed by South Korean studio SDEnterNET. Navy Field is a MMORTS themed game that takes place during the World War I and World War II eras. Like the name suggests, Navy Field 2 is a naval warfare game. It is developed by SDEnterNet who had already developed the original Navy Field years ago. Development started in 2012, closed beta was followed in January 2014 and was fully released in Korea in June of the same year. Navy Field 2 have started a Steam service as of March 2015.

== Gameplay ==
All gameplay happens in multiplayer matches, where players play against each other in teams on big maps with up to 64 players at the same time.

There are different kinds of ships in Navy Field 2 like frigates, destroyers, cruisers, battleships, aircraft carriers, and submarines. Every ship type has specific strengths and weaknesses, depending on its class and its game tier, with higher tiered ships being stronger than lower tier ones. All the ships in the game can be upgraded to higher tier ships as the player progresses further in the game and advances through the in-game "Ship Tree".

Players (who become the captains or commanding officers in-game) can manage the crews of their ship, by placing an executive officer (which called "operator") and up to 22 officers that take care of different aspects of the ship. The officers are classified into 4 categories: weapons officers, support officers, special officers and aviation officers. Officers boost the performance of the ship according to their role.

== Release ==
Navy Field 2 was revealed at Gamescom in 2012. Nexon announced that the game would launch in Japan in 2012, and Europe in 2013. It was released on 10 June 2014.
