= Seasons After Fall =

2016 video game

- Developer: Swing Swing Submarine
- Publisher: Focus Home Interactive
- Designer: William David
- Composer: Yann van der Cruyssen ("Morusque")
- Engine: Unity
- Platforms: Windows; PlayStation 4; Xbox One
- Release: Windows; September 2, 2016; Xbox One, PS4; May 16, 2017
- Genre: Puzzle-platform

Seasons After Fall is a puzzle-platform game developed by Swing Swing Submarine and published by Focus Home Interactive.

== Gameplay ==
The gameplay is a mixture of platforming and puzzle solving. Gradually the player unlocks the ability to change seasons at their will, manipulating the environment to allow the player to progress. For example, switching to winter will cause lakes to freeze, so they can be walked over, and then switching to fall will cause strong winds in certain areas, which lift up some platforms. Flying jellyfish can be used as a mode of transportation. Certain plants will allow the fox to jump higher. The game will not contain a steep difficulty curve in an attempt to feel generous to players. The player cannot actually die or lose – there are no "enemies" to speak of, but rather the game's main obstacles come in the form of figuring out what to do and where to go next.

== Plot ==
The game follows a Red fox as it traverses a mysterious forest in an effort to rescue the lost spirits of the four seasons.

== Development ==
Seasons After Fall was showcased at the 2015 Game Developers Conference. It was released on Windows and consoles in 2016. A trailer was shown at Gamescom 2014.

== Music ==
The soundtrack to Seasons After Fall was composed by Yann van der Cruyssen ("Morusque") and released by G4F Records on September 2, 2016.

== Reception ==
Reception

Aggregate scores
Aggregator	Score	
Aggregator	PC	PS4
GameRankings	75%	62%
Metacritic	75/100	64/100

On PC, it has a score of 75 on both Metacritic and GameRankings. It has somewhat lower scores on PlayStation 4.
