= Asia Game Show =

Annual video game expo held in Hong Kong, China

- Asia Game Show 2011 logo
- Status: Defunct
- Genre: Video Games
- Venue: Hong Kong Convention and Exhibition Centre
- Location: Wan Chai
- Country: China
- Inaugurated: 2002
- Attendance: 453,000+ (2010)
- Organizer: MP International
- Sponsor: The Chamber of H.K. Computer Industry
- Website: www.asiagameshow.com

The Asia Game Show (亞洲遊戲展), also known as AGS, was an annual video game expo held at the Hong Kong Convention and Exhibition Centre in Hong Kong, China. It was organized by MP International and sponsored by The Chamber of H.K. Computer Industry (香港電腦商會) and commonly held in December. The 2011 Asia Game Show was held from December 23 to December 26, and it broke previous attendance records with over 450,000 visitors.

It was the world's largest gaming event since 2011, with the number of visitors surpassing the attendance of the next two largest gaming events Gamescom and Brasil Game Show, making it the premier event in the video game industry.

== 亞洲國際博彩娛樂展會(G2E Asia) ==
Global Gaming Expo Asia (G2E Asia) is the premier Asian trade event and the largest regional sourcing platform for global gaming and entertainment products. G2E Asia services suppliers by enabling them to showcase new products, meet qualified buyers and establish new contacts. In 2014, more than 95% of the top Asian casino operators were at the show. Held in Macau, home to several casinos, G2E Asia is the hub where professionals network and conduct business.
