= Best International Games Festival =

Video game convention

- Status: Active
- Genre: Video games; Interactive entertainment
- Frequency: Annually
- Venue: Anhembi District
- Locations: São Paulo, Brazil
- Coordinates: 23°30′57″S 46°38′25″W
- Inaugurated: 2012; 14 years ago
- Most recent: April 30, 2025; 18 months ago
- Website: latam.gamescom.global/en/big-festival-en

The Best International Games Festival (formerly Brazil's Independent Games Festival), commonly referred to as BIG Festival, is an annual video game convention held in São Paulo, Brazil, as part of Gamescom Latam.

== History ==
The BIG Festival was first held in 2012 at the Museum of Image and Sound in São Paulo, Brazil. Between 2014 and 2018, the event took place annually at the São Paulo Cultural Center. In 2019, the festival was hosted at Club Homs. Due to the COVID-19 pandemic, the 2020 and 2021 editions were held entirely online. From 2022 to 2024, the festival has been held at the São Paulo Expo.

In 2024, the German video game convention Gamescom expanded into the South American market with the introduction of Gamescom Latam. The event was established through a collaboration with the BIG Festival and the Omelete Company. Gamescon Latam incorporated the BIG Festival into its program; however, the festival continues to operate as a distinct component within the broader event. As of 2025, the event is held at the Anhembi District.

== Events ==
#	Date	Venue	Visitors	Ref.
1	2012	Museum of Image and Sound	4,300	
2	May 10–18, 2014	São Paulo Cultural Center	8,000	
3	June 27 – July 7, 2015	São Paulo Cultural Center	12,600	
4	June 25 – July 3, 2016	São Paulo Cultural Center	18,000	
5	June 24 – July 2, 2017	São Paulo Cultural Center	20,000	
6	June 23 – July 1, 2018	São Paulo Cultural Center	30,000	
7	June 26–30, 2019	Club Homs	20,000	
8	June 22–26, 2020	online		
9	May 3–9, 2021	online		
10	July 7–10, 2022	São Paulo Expo	30,000	
11	June 28 – July 2, 2023	São Paulo Expo	50,000	
12	June 26–30, 2024	São Paulo Expo	100,000 (Note: Visitor numbers from 2024 onward reflect attendance at Gamescom Latam, which incorporates the BIG Festival as part of its program. These figures do not represent attendance for the BIG Festival alone.)	
13	April 30 – May 4, 2025	Anhembi District	130,000	
14	April 29 – May 3, 2026	Anhembi District		
