= Wind and Water: Puzzle Battles =

2007 video game

Wind And Water: Puzzle Battles
- Dreamcast cover art
- Developer(s): Yuan Works
- Publisher(s): Yuan Works (GP2X); Dragonbox (2016, Dreamcast); RedSpotGames (2008, Dreamcast)
- Designer(s): Yuan Hsi Chiang; Yuan Hao Chiang
- Platform(s): GP2X, Dreamcast, Windows, Linux
- Release: GP2X; August 24, 2007; Dreamcast; November 1, 2008; Windows; January 3, 2011
- Genre(s): Puzzle
- Mode(s): Single-player, multiplayer

Wind and Water: Puzzle Battles (or W&W) (simplified Chinese: 时空五行-风水大战; traditional Chinese: 時空五行-風水大戰; pinyin: Shíkōng Wǔxíng – Fēngshuǐ Dàzhàn, lit. "Wu Xing Space-Time – Great Feng Shui War") is a 2007 puzzle video game developed by Yuan Works, a company based in Korea, for the GP2X and Sega Dreamcast that combines strategy and action. As of January 2011, the game is freely available for Windows.

== Gameplay ==
There are elements in the game: Wood, Fire, Earth, Metal and Water. Also, there are two special blocks: Wind and Void. Both of these special blocks have special interaction with the rest of the blocks.

The basic strategy of the game is to rotate the blocks (elements) to match them in diamond shape (the same shape the cursor has). If these blocks have the same element, then they will disappear from the board, granting the player points according to the number of matched blocks.

Matching is the basic move of the game. It consists in gathering four matching elements in a diamond shape. This will make them disappear from the board. When blocks with the same element are adjacent they will disappear as well. This move is called a combo. The player can perform a full combo matching all the same element blocks in the board. When a group of blocks are matched and disappear, the rest of the blocks in the board fall to fill the gaps those blocks left. A chain will occur if the player matches another group of blocks with these falling blocks.

The press is at the bottom of the board. It will start rising if the player doesn't achieve enough points, minimizing the board's available space. After playing a while, the game speed will increase, causing the press to rise faster. The goal of the game is to keep the press from reaching the top, while achieving as many points as possible with the special moves the game has.

=== Skills ===
The game has three different skills to benefit both beginners and advanced players. Each skill presents different features, that will make them suitable for different kind of abilities.

- Beginner Auto-Max (Automatic Maximum): This skill grants the beginner players special time when they achieve a special move. Any group of blocks the player matches during this time will grant the player more points than it usually would.
- Advanced Time Combo-Ex (Extended): This skill is based on the combo ability, this means it will grant the player special combo time whenever a combo is performed. In this time, the player will gain more points for every special move achieved. This time can be extended by performing special moves.
- Time Chain SP (Super Cancel): The third skill is special for expert W&W players. It grants the player special time for chains. The board freezes after a special move is performed for an amount of time depending on the difficulty of the move performed. This time will allow the player to rotate the blocks in a way they perform chains when they fall. If the player finds a chain before the time ends, the board can be dropped to add more time to the chain time and allow the player to use the spare time.

== Reception ==
=== Critical performance ===
The game was nominated as a Finalist for the Independent Games Festival Mobile 2008, and was invited to the GDC 2008. The game was also third-place winner of the first GP2X Contest. The game was commercially released for the GP2X on August 24, 2007 as a download version. A Dreamcast version was released on November 10, 2008 by the European publisher redspotgames

== Development ==
Dreamcast demo was featured in the German Retro Magazine issue #8.

=== Release information ===
The GP2X version was released on August 24, 2007, whereas the Dreamcast version was released over a year later on November 10, 2008.

== See also ==
- Independent video game development
- List of commercially released independently developed Dreamcast games
