= Royal Quest =

Fantasy themed massively multiplayer online role-playing game (MMORPG)

Royal Quest Online
- Developers: Katauri Interactive, 1C Online Games
- Release: Russia: December 8, 2015; WW: December 23, 2015
- Genres: fantasy, massively multiplayer online role-playing game
- Modes: player versus environment, player versus player

Royal Quest Online (previously known as Royal Quest) is a 2012 free-to-play massively multiplayer online role-playing game (MMORPG) for Windows, originally developed by Katauri Interactive and published by 1C.

The game was officially announced on October 22, 2010. Katauri Interactive director Dmitry Gusarov hinted that Royal Quest might be more action-oriented than a traditional MMORPG, stating that "the present MMORPG market is full of projects with massive world distances and unhurried battles. We consider Royal Quest a nice adrenaline injection to the market and it will allow players to act as real heroes".

The game takes place on the fictional planet of Aura, where wizardry, alchemy, steampunk, and futuristic technologies coexist. Players choose one of four classes (Warrior, Archer, Mage, Rogue) and enter the service of King Roland, the ruler of the kingdom of Elenia, who is waging war against the mysterious Black Alchemists — humanoid creatures who arrived on Aura from another world in pursuit of highly rare and precious Elenium mineral with its many unique features.

Players are able to play in both player versus environment and player versus player modes within the game world.

== Development ==
The game was announced on October 22, 2010.
Open beta of the Russian version has been launched April 10, 2012.
Open beta of the English version was made available via Steam since August 4, 2014 (early access since July 31, 2014).
Royal Quest has been officially released December 8, 2015 in Russia and December 23, 2015, in the world.
An announcement has been made in 2020, stating that the US servers will be shut down. As a result, the game is currently unavailable to play via Steam. ARC and stand-alone client are available on the official website.

== Story ==
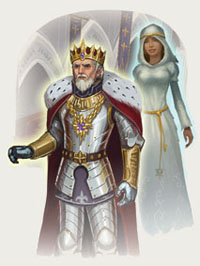

Blossoming world of Aura, the Golden Goddess, is endangered by vicious Black Alchemists, invaders from mysterious land of Terra. Hidden in their secret lairs they weave perfidious designs seeking to lay hold on resources of Elenium - rare and highly valuable mineral of unusual properties- but also striving to obtain material for their unholy researches: human flesh and souls. Hideous chimeras are created of kidnapped victims' bodies and their souls bound with Elenium serve for prolonging Black Alchemists' unwholesome life.

King Roland of Elenia, sprawling Human realm, calls everybody young, honest and brave to join his army preparing for last stand with malicious enemies of humankind and Aura herself. To arms heroes!

== Classes ==
There is only one playable race in Royal Quest - Humans. Player can choose of four classes: Warrior, Archer, Rogue and Mage. Each class can be evolved to a more specialized class with each special talents and abilities.
