= PlayStation Vita Pets =

2014 video game

- Developers: Spiral House; XDev
- Publisher: Sony Computer Entertainment
- Platform: PlayStation Vita
- Release: NA: 3 June 2014; EU: 6 June 2014
- Genre: Digital pet
- Mode: Single player

PlayStation Vita Pets is a pet simulation video game with puzzle and adventure game elements developed by Spiral House in conjunction with XDev and published by Sony Computer Entertainment for the PlayStation Vita. The player raises a virtual dog while also adventuring with them in a fictional realm. It received mixed reviews from critics and currently has a 63% from Metacritic.

== Gameplay ==
Using the touchscreen and microphone, the player can play with and manage a virtual dog. The gameplay's main focus is an adventure set in a region called Castlewood Island, where the player completes basic puzzles and works with their dog to complete challenges. The dogs in the game speak and have a full vocabulary, and respond to player voice commands. The dogs talk with the player and plead with them to adventure with them. The game's camera allows the pet to recognize their owner's face.

The game includes RPG elements and locks content until certain levels have been reached. A spin-off game, PlayStation Vita Pets: Puppy Parlour, was released for iOS and Android on June 3, 2014.

== Reception ==
PlayStation Vita Pets received mixed reviews; the game currently has a 63% approval rating on Metacritic.

The Guardian's Andy Robertson said that the minigames present in the game "lets Vita Pets deliver a much more involving experience than first appears to be the case." Destructoid's Brittany Vincent criticized the level grinding required to access some content but felt that it was still a stronger game than its competition nonetheless. Forbes's Andy Robertson felt that the game marked the "arrival of Sony's handheld for the younger members of the family" and noted that the children he shared the game with loved it.

Reaction to the dog's voices were mixed. Pocket Gamer's Matt Suckley said that the dog's voices "steal away the game's charm" and heavily criticized the decision to give them full human vocabularies. Destructoid's Brittany Vincent disagreed, noting that the voices were "positively "aww"-inducing from the get-go".
