= Renowned Explorers =

2015 video game

- Developer: Abbey Games
- Engine: AbbeyCore
- Platforms: Linux; Microsoft Windows; OS X
- Release: WW: 2 September 2015
- Genre: Strategy
- Mode: Single-player

Renowned Explorers: International Society is a turn-based strategy adventure video game set in a fictitious 19th century historical setting. It was released on 2 September 2015 as a boxed game for PC and on the Steam computer game platform. The game was inspired by adventure movies including Indiana Jones, and retro-classic video games including FTL.

The game was created by the independent studio Abbey Games and runs on an in-house developed engine called Abbey Core.

== Developments ==
After Abbey Games’ previous success Reus, a game released in May 2013 on Steam, they started development on Renowned Explorers: International Society. A bigger team was hired, and the beta was released in February 2015. After more than a year of development, the game was released on Steam on September 2, 2015.

== Gameplay ==
Renowned Explorers: International Society is a single-player turn-based strategy adventure game. The player assembles a group of three adventurers with their individual skills and abilities. The player can choose from 20 different explorers (4 additional ones with the expansion "The Emperor's Challenge") categorized as fighters, scouts, speakers, and scientists, each with their individual character traits. With this group, the player can travel across the world and go on one of the procedurally generated expeditions in a quest to find treasures. A typical treasure hunt follows the following steps:

Preparation This part of the game takes part on the world map. The player’s band of adventurers need to travel from place to place in turns to prepare for their expedition. With the knowledge, gold and status gained from previous expeditions, the player can buy gear, supplies and support in order to prepare for the next treasure hunt.

Expedition This section of the game is played on a locale map where the treasure is hidden. The player has to choose the party's route, which determines what they might encounter along the way. The player will be confronted with decisions, such as whether to spend supplies aiding local people. Inevitably, the player will be faced with an encounter.

Encounter – Attitude Gameplay This part of the game takes place on a Voronoi grid. The terrain is procedurally generated and the player’s adventurers are placed on the grid, facing off against the AI controlled locals. Each turn, the player moves and performs actions with the team of adventurers. This is limited by the number of action points each adventurer has. The player is faced with a choice of how to approach the locals called ‘Attitude-based Gameplay’. These can be by:’

- Fighting them with melee, ranged and area of effect attacks
- Winning them over using cheers, charms and compliments
- Scaring them away through insults, taunts and humiliation

However, if the player chooses to deal with the locals, it will have repercussions in the future, as the player’s band of adventurers will develop a certain reputation.

Publications

PC Gamer - Phil Savage

Rock, Paper Shotgun - Adam Smith

Destructoid - Jordan Devore
