= IHF Handball Challenge (video game series) =

IHF Handball Challenge was a series of professional handball simulation video games developed by German studio Neutron Games from 2011 to 2014.

== IHF Handball Challenge 12 ==
IHF Handball Challenge 12
- Developer: Neutron Games
- Publisher: N.N.
- Series: IHF Handball Challenge
- Platform: Microsoft Windows
- Release: October 28, 2011
- Genre: Handball Simulation
- Modes: Single-player, multiplayer

IHF Handball Challenge 12 was the first PC sports game ever devoted to handball (excluding management game Handball Manager and the arcade game Heavy Smash/Hyper Handball). Developed by Neutron Games for PC, it was released on October 28, 2011. On February 3, 2011, Neutron Games announced that the game would be sponsored by the International Handball Federation, so that all national teams are included in the game. The game also included the World Men's Handball Championship.

=== League ===
- Germany – Bundesliga
- Spain – Liga ASOBAL
- Rest Of The World
- National Teams

== IHF Handball Challenge 14 ==
IHF Handball Challenge 14
- Developer: Neutron Games
- Publisher: Bigben Interactive
- Series: IHF Handball Challenge
- Platforms: Microsoft Windows, PlayStation 3, Xbox 360 by Nacon
- Release: 28 March 2014
- Genre: Handball Simulation
- Modes: Single-player, multiplayer

IHF Handball Challenge 14 was the second video game developed by Neutron Games, and released for the PlayStation 3, Windows, Xbox 360 by Nacon. It included all 120 teams from the 2013-2014 season.

== Current state of IHF Handball Challenge ==
This series has been abandoned by Nacon, and has been completely replaced by the Handball series by Eko Software, a subsidiary of Nacon.
