= Nuclear Union =

Cancelled video game

- Developer(s): Best Way
- Publisher(s): 1C Company
- Platform(s): Microsoft Windows
- Release: Cancelled
- Genre(s): Role-playing

Nuclear Union (Russian: Новый Союз / Novyy Soyuz, actually meaning "New Union") is a cancelled post-apocalyptic role-playing video game. It was developed by the Ukrainian company Best Way, and supposed to be funded and published by the Russian publisher 1C Company, to be released in 2014 for Microsoft Windows, but the latter pulled its involvement at the end of 2013 due to the political instability in Ukraine, resulting in the game's cancellation.

The story begins during the Cuban Missile Crisis of 1962, with the majority of the narrative and gameplay taking place in an alternate, modern-day Soviet Union after a nuclear war.

The artistic style of Nuclear Union was a dark retrofuturist one, with post-apocalyptic landscapes and older prototypes beside modern weapons, reminiscent of other famous Ukrainian games such as S.T.A.L.K.E.R. and Metro 2033.

Best Way published three trailers for Nuclear Union: announcement trailer, concept art trailer, and the gameplay trailer.

== Plot ==
Nuclear Union was intended as a large-scale role-playing video game, taking place in a post-apocalyptic alternative reality in which the world has survived a nuclear war that broke out after the Cuban Missile Crisis. Fifty years after the war, the fragments of the Soviet Union that were hastily brought underground have gradually become a real state with its own capital, a city called Pobedograd.

The game's main protagonist is a former pilot of the Soviet military aviation, who is sent from the underground city of "Pobedograd" in the subsoil of Moscow to the radioactive external surface, for various missions on behalf of the underground government of Pobedograd, including the recovery of advanced Soviet pre-nuclear war technologies and investigating a set of strange and mysterious phenomena that are happening on the outer surface.

The protagonist is depicted as carrying the Korobov TKB-408 bullpup rifle, a Soviet prototype from 1946. According to in-game lore, the Korobov was revived when counter-revolutionary gangs found the documentation and the weapon began appearing in the regions of Ryazan and Tambov; the deficiencies of the weapon were corrected with it being referred to as "Object 93" (Ob'yekt 93) in reference to the year its schematics were discovered.
