= Dragon Fin Soup =

2015 video game

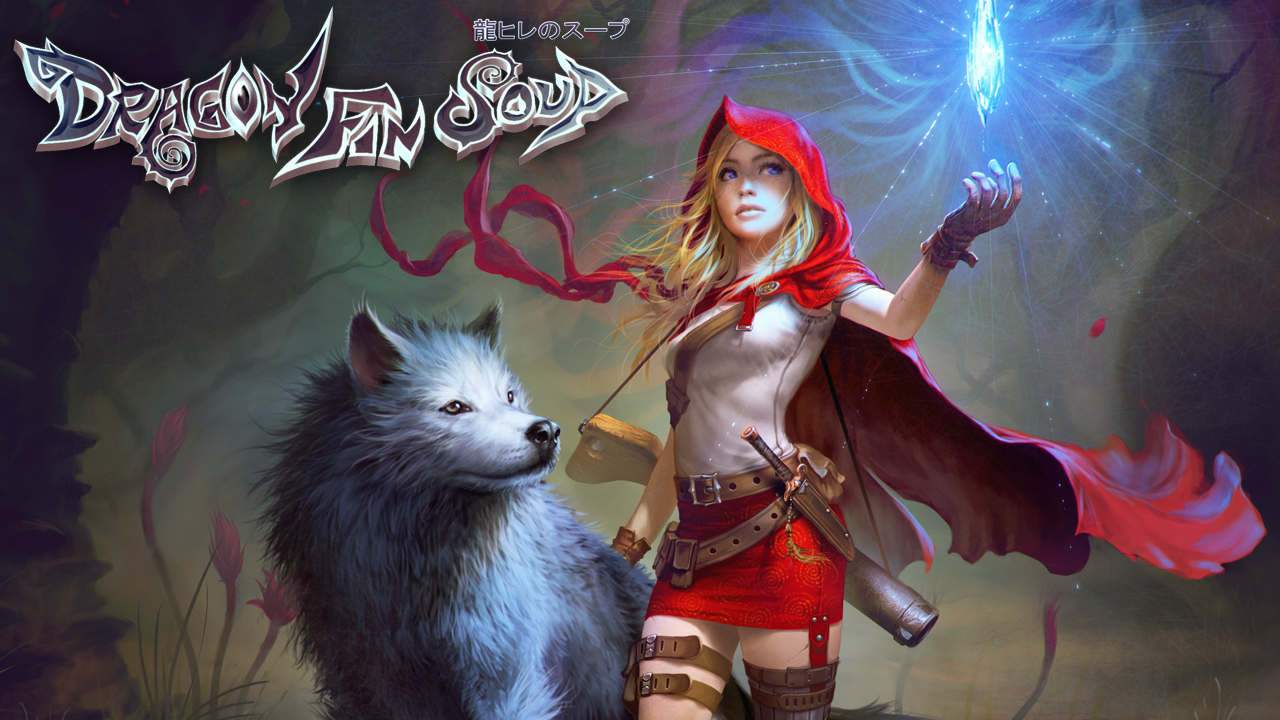
- Developer: Grimm Bros
- Publisher: Grimm Bros
- Platforms: Windows, PlayStation 3, PlayStation 4, PlayStation Vita
- Release: WW: November 3, 2015
- Genres: Roguelike, role-playing
- Mode: Single-player

Dragon Fin Soup is a role-playing video game created by the independent development studio Grimm Bros. It is the studio's first title and was released on Microsoft Windows, PlayStation 4, PlayStation 3, and PlayStation Vita. It is influenced by roguelike games and uses procedural generation. The game has two modes: Story mode follows a story and is more like a typical role-playing game, while Survival mode skips the story and focuses on the surviving within the game and constrains players with permadeath—once the player character dies, the game must be restarted from the beginning.

== Gameplay ==
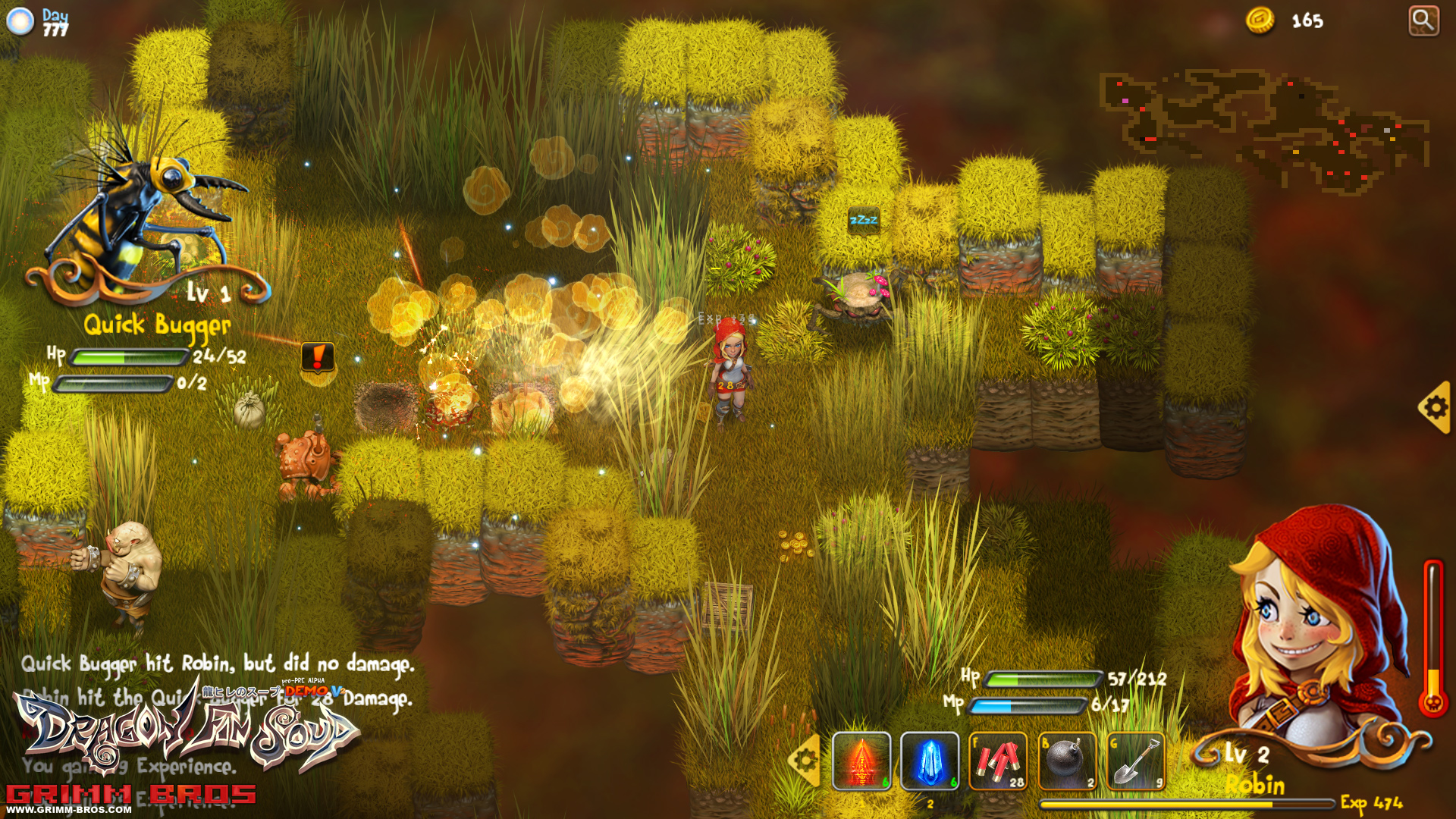
Screenshot from the game

Dragon Fin Soup is a role-playing game with roguelike qualities and graphics inspired by the Super NES, playing from a top-down, 2-dimensional perspective. Tactical combat and movement take place in turns, with both the player and enemies taking actions during each turn. The game includes scripted events and procedurally generated content. Two modes of play are available: Story mode has the player controlling the first playable character, Red Robin, as she works her way through a pre-scripted storyline in the vein of a typical role-playing game. Survival mode features permadeath gameplay, and starts players out in a forest where they must find supplies and fight through increasingly difficult randomly generated dungeons. The speed of gameplay matches the speed of the player; if the player moves quickly through the game world, then so do the enemies.

A range of activities can be pursued including fishing, crafting, gathering, mining, digging, and cooking. Players have 20 slots in which to store equipment and other useful items, are able to dual-wield weapons, and can acquire pets to join them in the game. The world includes many different locations to explore including forests, caves, mines, deserts, mansions, castles, and ruins. The climate in the game is randomly generated which affects both the weather and earthquakes in each area.

== Plot ==
The game takes place on Asura, a world situated on the back of an enormous dragon-turtle. The story follows Red Robin, an alcoholic yet cheerful mercenary, who drinks to forget events of her past. The game uses elements from fairy tales and legends including Robin Hood and Little Red Riding Hood.

== Development ==
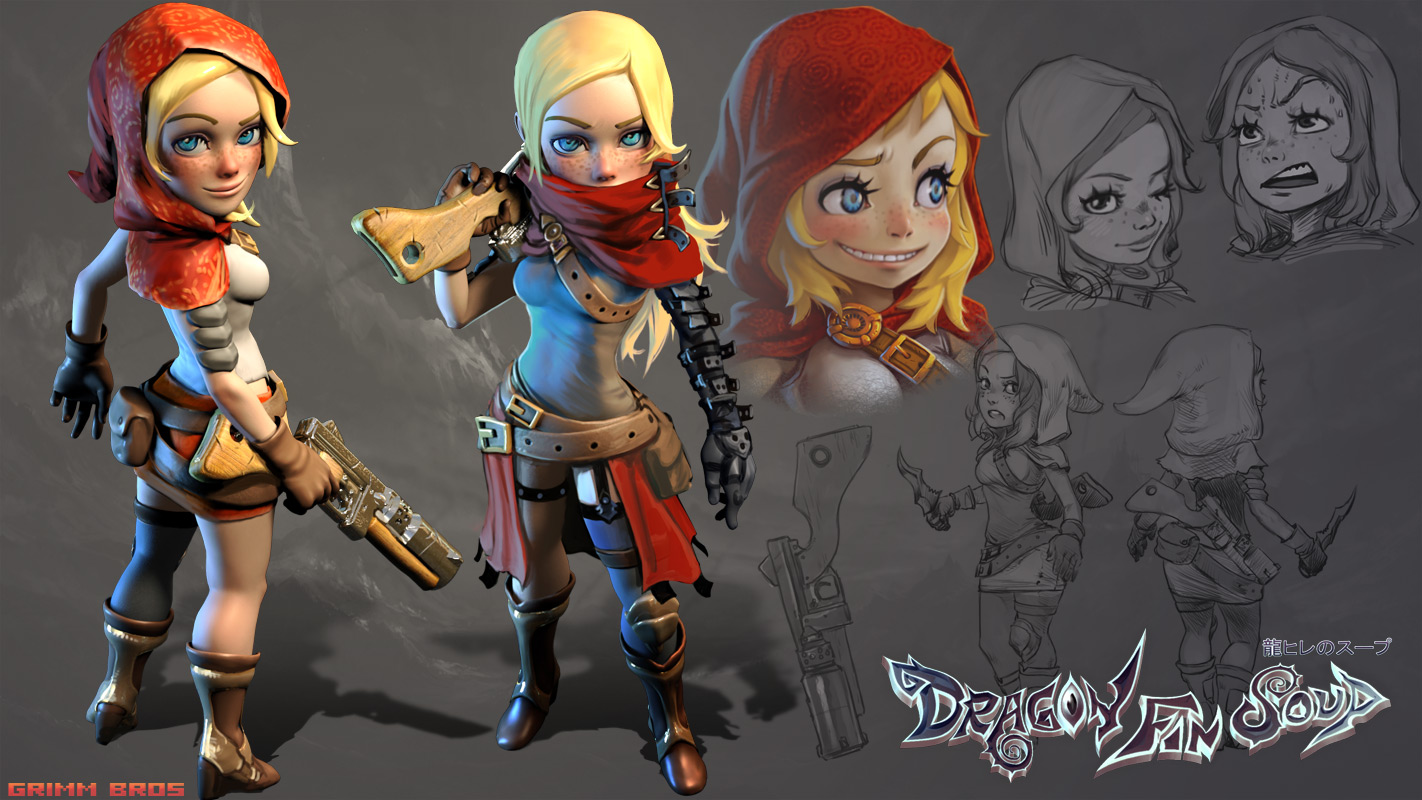
Concept art for the main character.

The game is the first title by the five person independent development studio Grimm Bros. The development studio was founded in March 2013 by Human Head Studios' former COO Ash Monif and by Randis Albion, an artist that previously worked on League of Legends, AquaNox: The Angel's Tears, and Magic: The Gathering.

Development was part-funded through a Kickstarter crowdfunding campaign. The campaign launched in March 2014 with an initial goal of US$24,000 to provide funding the base game. It concluded in April with $119,719 raised, achieving a stretch goal of porting the game to Sony platforms. As part of a 75-game wave of approvals, Valve accepted the game to be sold and distributed through their Steam software platform.

As of December 2019, the game has been abandoned by its developers, and the promised "Extra Chunky Edition" and further updates have been indefinitely postponed. No official announcements were made, but the developers' online presences are no longer maintained.
