= Kingdom Under Fire II =

- Developers: Blueside; Phantagram
- Publisher: Gameforge
- Director: Sang Youn Lee
- Producer: Sang Youn Lee
- Composers: Cris Velasco; Chris Rickwood
- Platform: Windows
- Release: November 14, 2019
- Genres: Real-time strategy, role-playing
- Modes: Single-player, multiplayer

Kingdom Under Fire II was a video game set in a high fantasy setting developed by Blueside which merged real-time strategy (RTS), role-playing game (RPG) and massively multiplayer online game (MMO) genres. The game had a single-player and an online multiplayer mode. The game followed on chronologically from Kingdom Under Fire: Circle of Doom, and was the first RTS game set in the Kingdom Under Fire universe to be released since the 2005 Kingdom Under Fire: Heroes. Due to its mass cancellation, most of the 4 platforms were scrapped, and it was Windows-exclusive.

The game was announced in January 2008, and has been subject to delay and changes to release platforms; a closed beta-test began in December 2011 in South Korea.

In November 2013, the developers announced plans for a PlayStation 4 version. However, in November 2019, development plans had ultimately been scrapped.

The Chinese version of Kingdom Under Fire 2 entered a no-wipe Closed Beta state in March 2017. In July, the Taiwanese version entered an Open Beta.

Kingdom Under Fire II was released in mid November 2019. On September 17, 2021 it was announced that the global version of the game's servers would be closed on October 26, 2021.

== Gameplay ==
The game combined action RPG with real-time strategy. The player was to control a hero who could command various troops. The player had full control of their character and could run around freely with their troops following them. When controlling other units, the game played like a typical RTS; cannons for example could be used to break down castle walls and spearmen could be used to protect troops from cavalry.

== Plot ==
The plot of Kingdom Under Fire II is chronologically after the events in Circle of Doom, which took place within the alternative dimension of the game's antagonist – Encablossa. The game's events continued the story of the Kingdom Under Fire universe, 150 years after Kingdom Under Fire: The Crusaders, and introduce a new faction – the 'Encablossians', who have been brought from the Encablossan dimension by Regnier, an antagonist in previous games.

The game was to explore the wars between three factions: the Human Alliance, Dark Legion, and Encablossians in their struggle for control of the game's world, the continent of Bersia.

== Development ==
The game was originally announced in January 2008 to be published on PC and console platforms in 2009. The game was to be a blend of MMO and RTS gameplay to create a "Multiplayer Online Action RTS" or MMORTS; key elements of the gameplay design include a single player 'story mode' as in the earlier RTS Kingdom Under Fire: The Crusaders, and a separate online multiplayer element where players would be able to undertake battles, both castle sieges, and pitched battles in fields. The MMO aspect of the game was to take place in a persistent world, with players able to form and join guilds and take part in territorial battles (in up to 15 vs 15 player matches).

In July 2009, Blueside confirmed an Xbox 360 version for release in 2010, the Xbox 360 version was stated to have greater emphasis on the single player campaign, and to also have an online multiplayer mode, as well as downloadable content, but a MMORTS mode was not confirmed.

In March 2010, the project was reported by MMOSITE.com to be rumoured to be in development hell, with developer Blueside in financial trouble, with some employees salaries unpaid, and also as being affected by the departure of part of Blueside's development team to form a new company. In an interview representatives from Blueside and Phantagram stated that 90 persons were working on the project, and that the game had been delayed due a shortage of manpower caused by simultaneous development of console and PC versions, as well as delays due to inexperience with online game development. The lead developer Lee Sang Yong stated that there was no real problem with the development.

In October 2010, the Xbox 360 version was announced to be delayed to at least Christmas 2011 due to restrictions imposed on Xbox Live games by Microsoft relating to billing; development of the actual game system was said by the developers to be complete. The projects budget had exceeded $20 million by late 2010.

In November 2010, Blueside announced the development of a PlayStation 3 version, initially with a projected release date in 2012, citing the suitability of the PS3's online mechanism's for adding updates. Issues relating to the online Xbox 360 version were stated to be under continued discussion with Microsoft.

The game was developed with a video game rating of 15+, though the developers expected it may receive an 18+ rating due to the combat and war elements. A closed beta test began in late 2011.

In November 2013, the developer Blueside announced the game would be released for PC in Korea in the next month, and that the game was also in development for the PlayStation 4. At the G-Star Korean gaming industry convention (November 2013), producer Sang-Yoon Lee announced that the game would be released on PC in South Korea, Malaysia and Singapore in the next month. At G-Star Sang-Yoon Lee apologised for delays to the game, explaining that the development had been hampered by loss of half of its original 160 person team, as well as market conditions in South-East Asia, where the high computer specification requirements of the game meant a limited market for the product, requiring work to allow the game to run a relatively low powered hardware (e.g. GeForce 7600 graphics card); at the same time a PS4 version of the game was stated to be in development and expected to be complete by around May 2014. In a November 2019 interview, Kingdom Under Fire II creative director Joo-Bo Kim confirmed that there were no current plans for a PlayStation 4 version and that development was focused sole on PC.

MMOGAsia announced open beta for Kingdom Under Fire II for May 22, 2014. The developer revealed that there will be no data wipes after the launch of open beta, so any progress made during the testing phase will carry over to full release.

In April 2017, MMOGAsia announced that the game would be shut down permanently.

In the spring of 2017 the launch in Russia was announced. Innova is to be the Russian publisher. The CBT phase is expected in the fall of 2017, so far there is a teaser website.

It was announced on February 20, 2019, that the Russian servers would be shut down on March 20, 2019. The developers said this was due to working on "new projects". Kingdom Under Fire II wasn't confirmed for abandonment, but won't be available for playing. On September 17, 2021 Gameforge announced that it was discontinuing operations of the North American and European servers and that they would be going offline on October 26, 2021.
