= Ninety-Nine Nights =

2006 video game

- Developers: Microsoft Game Studios Japan; Q Entertainment; Phantagram
- Publisher: Microsoft Game Studios
- Designers: Sang Youn Lee; Tetsuya Mizuguchi
- Composers: Pınar Toprak; Takayuki Nakamura; Shingo Yasumoto; Yasuo Kijima (arranger; original music by Antonín Dvořák and Antonio Vivaldi)
- Platform: Xbox 360
- Release: JP: April 20, 2006; NA: August 15, 2006; EU: August 25, 2006; AU: August 28, 2006
- Genre: Hack and slash
- Mode: Single-player

Ninety-Nine Nights (Japanese: ナインティ ナイン ナイツ, Hepburn: Nainti Nain Naitsu), stylized as N3: Ninety-Nine Nights, is a 2006 fantasy hack and slash video game developed for the Xbox 360 by Microsoft Game Studios Japan, Q Entertainment and Phantagram. It was released in Japan on April 20, 2006, and for other markets in August.

Video game designer Tetsuya Mizuguchi served as producer for the game. The game features hundreds of enemies onscreen at any given time, and borrows heavily from other video games of the genre, most notably from the Dynasty Warriors and Kingdom Under Fire series.

A sequel, Ninety-Nine Nights II, was released in 2010.

A third game, N3: Ninety-Nine Nights Online was a free-to-play browser-based MMORPG co-developed by Q Entertainment and Taiwanese studio UserJoy Technology. The game launched in Asia (primarily Japan and Taiwan) around December 7, 2011 following a closed and open beta period. However, it never achieved major commercial success and was quietly shut down on September 27, 2012.

== Plot ==
In the struggle between light and dark, a new order is created after a mysterious power stone is destroyed. These two forces are destined to fight each other since the beginning of time, each one intending to retake control of everything. Will the side of light be the winner, or will the world once again undergo 99 nights of darkness? The world of Ninety-Nine Nights has not always been an endless battlefield. There was a time when peace existed between all of the races. When a magical orb was shattered, light and dark entered the world, and a demon was born, this resulting in 99 nights of perpetual darkness. The Demon Lord led his army to take arms, but he was defeated on the one-hundredth day of battle by the Keeper of the Orb. The slain demon was named the King of Ninety Nine Nights after the months of darkness that their world endured. Peace was present, though ephemeral. Soon after, the Keeper of the Orb was murdered and the sacred orb was split in half. The humans took possession of the light shard, leaving the goblins with the dark shard. In the divisive war, humans and goblins fought for what seemed like an endless amount of time. Tides turned in favor of the humans when the elves sided with them. But while the goblins retreated back into the forbidden forest of the lost, the Goblin King was making his own ally, the Lord of Darkness.

== Gameplay ==
Ninety-Nine Nights is of the crowd combat subgenre, in which players battle hundreds of foes simultaneously. Combo moves are performed by using various combinations of the two main attack buttons, while the jump and dash buttons can initiate other actions or specialty attacks. Individual enemies are generally quite weak, typically being unable to perform any combos or block with any effectiveness.

There are seven different characters with different play styles, although only one character, Inphyy, is unlocked at the beginning. Successfully completing each character's story will unlock one or two new characters, until they have all been revealed.

After completing levels in Ninety-Nine Nights, a player's performance is scored, with both a letter grade and 'points' being awarded, depending on how well the player did. Points can be spent to unlock extras, such as concept art and character bios.

The title has limited role-playing elements, with characters gaining levels and being able to select which weapons and accessories to equip. These performance-enhancing items can be found in the different stages or are awarded for excellent performance, providing benefits such as increased attack power. As the characters gain levels they learn additional attack combinations, but there is no opportunity for skill customization.

Another key component of the title is the "Orb Attack" / "Orb Spark" element. Killing enemies yields red orbs that are stored up until the "Orb Attack" bar is full. Once the bar is full, a player may press B to enter "Orb Attack" mode, where the character can use powerful attacks to slay groups of enemies. Enemies killed while in this mode drop blue, not red, orbs. Once a player has stored up enough blue orbs (which usually require several "Orb Attacks"), he or she can unleash a super-devastating, screen-clearing "Orb Spark" attack. Killing enemies yields the occasional equipment drop, which the players can equip any time during a map as long as they are not retaliating from an attack, in midair, or in the middle of an attack.

The orb collection mechanic is not unlike that found in Onimusha: Warlords except that it is automatic. The orb attacks are comparable to "Musou attacks" in the Dynasty Warriors series, in that the player is invulnerable while making them, although in Ninety-Nine Nights, such attacks are significantly more powerful. Each character has their own unique attacks, weapons and orb attacks, as well having their own questline (of around four stages on average).

The gameplay differs somewhat from previous games in this genre as enemy soldiers put up virtually no resistance. Players will routinely mow down thousands of such troops per level using various attack combinations. The Orb attacks effectively act as "nuke buttons", destroying vast formations of enemy soldiers, with only boss characters and some formation leaders unaffected. Each level takes the form of a series of smaller battles which are often interspersed with cutscenes. Although there are usually several objectives during a level, progress through levels and the game is mostly linear. In a stark contrast to the cannon fodder foes, the boss characters are typically quite challenging and can inflict massive amounts of damage in a short period of time.

== Development ==
Kingdom Under Fire: Heroes developer Youn-Lee was involved in creating the game. The game had only seven months development time - development kits were received in September 2005, and the game was released in April 2006 in Japan.

== Soundtrack ==
Ninety-Nine Nights Original Soundtrack

Soundtrack album by various artists
- Released: May 24, 2006
- Recorded: 2006
- Genre: Video game soundtrack
- Length: 54:08
- Label: TEAM Entertainment, Inc.
- Producers: Pinar Toprak; Shingo Yasumoto; Takayuki Nakamura; Antonín Dvořák; Antonio Lucio Vivaldi

=== Track listing ===
1. "Theme from Ninety-Nine Nights" [2:25]
2. "From the New World: Molto Vivace (Eternal Mix)" [3:01]
3. "Comes Off Run There" [3:35]
4. "Hammerfall" [3:51]
5. "Spiral Maze!" [3:33]
6. "Carry Wind Out" [3:18]
7. "Destroys Evil Completely" [4:33]
8. "The Four Seasons "Summer" Presto (Eternal Mix)" [2:55]
9. "Ninety-Nine Nights (N3): The Defender of Truth" [4:59]
10. "Place Where They Live" [4:44]
11. "Eyes of Evil" [4:06]
12. "Ninety-Nine Nights (N3): Tokyo Remix" [2:27]
13. "Before the War" [2:08]
14. "Ninety-Nine Nights (N3): From a Distant Forest" [2:05]
15. "Ninety-Nine Nights (N3): The Arrival" [3:10]
16. "The Four Seasons 'Winter' Allegro" [3:09]

The tracks were composed by Pinar Toprak (1, 9, 12, 14, 15), Takayuki Nakamura (3, 6, 7, 10, 11, 13), Shingo Yasumoto (4, 5), Antonín Dvořák (2) and Antonio Vivaldi (8, 16).

== Reception ==
Reception

Aggregate score
Aggregator	Score
Metacritic	61/100

Review scores
Publication	Score
The A.V. Club	C
Computer Games Magazine	2/5
Edge	6/10
Electronic Gaming Monthly	5/10 (Note: Two critics of Electronic Gaming Monthly gave the game each a score of 4.5/10, and the other gave it 6/10.)
Eurogamer	7/10
Famitsu	(X360) 37/40; 31/40
Game Informer	7.5/10
GameRevolution	D
GameSpot	5.9/10
GameSpy	3/5
GameTrailers	6/10
GameZone	7/10
IGN	5.6/10
Official Xbox Magazine (US)	7.5/10
Detroit Free Press	2/4

Ninety-Nine Nights received "mixed" reviews according to the review aggregation website Metacritic.

In Japan, however, Famitsu gave it a score of three eights and one seven, while Famitsu X360 gave it a score of one ten and three nines.

GamePro said that the game "does have its moments, but ultimately, it serves as yet another example of how visually pleasing eye candy can't completely mask flawed game mechanics. It might be a good title to crack out when you just want to mash buttons and take in the fireworks, but if you're looking for a more lasting and memorable experience you're out of luck." (Note: GamePro gave the game two 4.5/5 scores for graphics and sound, 4/5 for control, and 3.5/5 for fun factor.)

X-Play gave it three stars out of five, saying, "The addition of perspective and emotional content comes out of left field, but is amazingly well done. It's the rare button masher that can play on a person's sympathies, and Nights proves it has both heart and brains to go with its mindless exterior."
