= Trickcal: Chibi Go =

2023 video game

- App icon for the global half-year anniversary event, featuring Speaki
- Developer: EPIDGames
- Publishers: KR: EPIDGames; WW: Bilibili Game
- Artist: diyap
- Composers: Warak; Studio EIM
- Platforms: iOS, Android
- Release: KR: September 27, 2023; WW: October 9, 2025; CN: December 18, 2025
- Genres: Role-playing, auto battler, comedy
- Modes: Single-player, multi-player

Trickcal: Chibi Go, (Note: Korean: 트릭컬 리바이브; RR: Teurikkeol ribaibeu; Japanese: トリッカル・もちもちほっペ大作戦, romanized: Torikkaru Mochi Mochi Hoppe Daisakusen; Chinese: 嘟嘟脸恶作剧; pinyin: Dū dū liǎn èzuòjù) also known as Trickcal: Re:VIVE or simply Trickcal, is a free-to-play auto battler role-playing mobile game developed by South Korean studio EPIDGames. Initially released in South Korea in 2021, it was re-launched and self-published by EPIDGames in September 2023. A global version was published worldwide by Bilibili Game in October 2025, and a mainland Chinese server followed in December 2025.

The game won the Best Game Award in the 2024 Korea Game Awards. Speaki, a character in the game, became an internet meme, spawning the creation of Raising Spiki, an unofficial MMO based on the character.

== Gameplay ==
Trickcal: Chibi Go is an auto battler fantasy role-playing game with card collecting elements in which combat is divided into two parts: the “team build" phase in which the player selects cards to strengthen their party, and the “battle" phase utilizing auto-chess mechanics. The player can manually activate characters' "senior skill" abilities during this phase.

Trickcal is characterized by its level of interactivity with characters on-screen. At any point, players can pull a character's cheeks, such as in stories, menu screens, and during dedicated animations with accompanying voice lines. The game also features daily tasks.

== Story ==
Trickcal: Chibi Go is set in the world of Elias, a fantastical realm inhabited by chibi characters who live under the protection of a world tree named Yggdrasil. The player is a human transported to Elias who is shortly appointed the leader of a religious organization called the Order of Yggdrasil. The main story chronicles the adventures of the "Master" (Note: Korean: 교주; RR: gyoju; Japanese: 教主, romanized: kyōshu) and their attempts to solve the conflicts that arise between the different races of Elias, which include sprites, werebeasts, elves, elementals, phantoms, dragons, and witches.

The story is divided into the main story (the chapters of which are unlocked via the "Crusade" campaign mode), side stories for other game modes, and limited-time "Themed Theater" story arcs that each focus on a specific playable character.

=== Season 1 ===
No.	Title
1	"At Least Spread Some Jam" (Korean: 최소한 잼은 발라줘)
Amidst a violent insurgency in the Sprite Kingdom of Erpien, a human struggles to get their bearings and ends up in the company of a fleeing Erpin and Ner. Cornered by insurgents, the human finds a revolver on the ground and fires it to scare them away. Ner declares the human the savior of Elias and the Master of the Order of Yggdrasil. To take back the throne, Erpin enlists the help of baker and magic teacher Ashur, pyromaniac adventurer Marie, and seedy collector Mayo. The party attempts to reclaim Erpin's throne by force with the help of the royal guards, but a fight between the guards and insurgents forces the party to flee the kingdom. Ashur disappears in the chaos. After the Master suggests addressing the cause of the insurgency directly—a sugar shortage caused by Erpien's sole elven supplier—the party heads to Werebeast Forest for help.
2	"Chow Unites Us All" (Korean: 사료로 대동단결)
In Werebeast Forest, the Master's party encounters a cat werebeast named Kommy and a dog werebeast named Butter eating canned chow. Kommy describes a rumor spread by the Chow Rebels (a three-member freedom fighter front consisting of leader and skilled swordswoman Tig, strategist Rufo, and strongwoman Beni) that the cans were set as bait by the sprites as part of a larger plot to assume control of the werebeast population. The Chow Rebels are currently exploiting a piece of evidence against the sprites: the labels of Erpin on the boxes of chow. Granted a brief moment of lucidity from intelligence-enhancing pills in the chow, Erpin tells werebeast chief Diana that the chow is part of a false flag operation meant to sow conflict between the sprites and werebeasts, and reveals that the labels are covering labels of Elena, the elven mayor of the city-state of Monatium. Confronted by the Chow Rebels, the Master again fires their revolver to scare them away. Ner posits that the chow deliveries are connected to the Erpien sugar shortage, and the party, sans Marie, departs for Monatium with the tenuously allied Chow Rebels.
3	"Getting Schooled on Tragedy" (Korean: 참극의 참교육)
The arrival of a human in Monatium puts Elena and her secretary Amelia on high alert, as the elves had previously been enslaved by the United States of America after a failed invasion. The party stumbles upon a medieval armor-clad elf named Rohne, who introduces herself as a tour guide. Agitated by the Master's presence, she confesses to being a spy and requests extraction, attracting the attention of the elven Suppression Unit. Elena discloses over an intercom her scheme to force the sprites to migrate for the expansion of Monatium, and her intent to dissect Yggdrasil for research into a means of returning the elves to their home dimension. The party and Rohne infiltrate Elena's underground lab. Elena attacks the group with her M.E.O.W. (Note: Mechanical Emotion Observation Weapon) mecha. The Master attempts to retaliate with their revolver, nicknamed "Coco" by Mayo, but is stopped by a witch named Fricle, who had been conspiring with Elena but has turned on her after hearing of her planned dissection of Yggdrasil. Fricle damages the M.E.O.W.'s weapons system and disappears, and Tig destroys the mecha altogether. Sympathizing with the elves, Erpin offers Elena help with dimensional research via the sprites' inherent magical abilities in exchange for a proper apology from Elena. As the group and Elena leave Werebeast Forest after Elena's apology to Diana, Butter alerts them to a new crisis in Erpien.
4	"5-Minute Countdown to Kingdom Implosion" (Korean: 왕국 폭발 5분 전)
The Master's party returns to a ruined Erpien. Elena tries to escape from her bindings, but is stopped by Ashur. Erpin attacks Ashur for her supposed act of treason before Marie clears things up. Ashur recounts what had happened in Erpin's absence—mysterious individuals began supplying a sugar substitute to the kingdom's citizens, but after the substitute was found to be made of ground aphids and the suppliers were revealed to be witches, the relative peace that followed gave way to a second insurgency and a witch hunt. Erpin's formal return to Erpien is interrupted by Velvet, a witch after Erpin's throne. Velvet challenges Erpin to a duel. A heavy blow from Velvet's axe ricochets off of Erpin's head, merely knocking her unconscious much to the Master's amazement. (Note: It is later revealed that Velvet struck with enough force to kill Erpin were it not for everyone in Elias being granted an immunity to grievous injury or death; the concept of death itself is only understood by the Master and the elves.) Velvet announces to the sprite citizens her intent to replace their sugar-dependent diets with healthy food, resulting in yet another riot. Ner believes that Velvet and Fricle are acting behind the back of the Witch Queen Belita, Erpin's sister and a respected ruler; Elena suggests that Belita has gone missing, and her absence has in turn plunged the Witch Kingdom of Belitein into chaos. Having laid claim to Erpin's throne, Velvet claims that Belita deliberately left Belitein out of cowardice, enraging Erpin. Velvet counters a punch from Erpin and easily subdues her, but is ganged up on by the sprites of the party in return. With the witches' invasion thwarted, the kingdom is rebuilt and sugar supplies are restored. Ner is seen meeting with a shadowed figure offering her information on the witches for a price.
5	"Watching the Neighbors Crash and Burn" (Korean: 옆 집 불구경)
Erpien's sugar shipments from Monatium are replaced with saccharin, with Rohne sent as an envoy to explain that the elven factories are under attack by elementals. Erpin reluctantly decides to help the elves, bringing the Master and Rohne along. The fire elemental Ifrit is responsible for the attacks, citing the elves' enslavement of elementals to run power plants. Elena in turn accuses Ifrit of enslaving her own kind, citing the favourable employment contracts and the elementals' willingness to work for the elves. Ifrit is caught in one of the factories' fire sprinkler systems and retreats to a steam power plant to regain stamina. Elena's efforts to douse Ifrit with water are unsuccessful in stopping her rampage. Just as Ifrit prepares to attack, a girl riding a large frog intervenes. Introducing herself as Ui, a drizzle elemental, she summons a light rain that finally subdues Ifrit. Back at the palace, Erpin is devastated to learn that factory damage has resulted in a one-month delay before proper sugar shipments resume. Ner meets again with her informant, the amethyst dragon Sist, who states that Fricle is behind the factory incident.
6	"Bow 4 Times, Kneel 4 Times" (Korean: 네 번 절하고 네 번 박아)
After an Order hymnal and other documents are stolen from Erpien, the party splits up to find the culprit, with Erpin, the Master, and Ashur headed to Elemental Mountain to investigate a coinciding blue meteor sighting. They meet the playful water elemental Naia, who directs them to the earth elemental Gabia for help reaching the mountain's peak. The three and Gabia attract the attention of Ifrit, forcing an escape. After getting lost in the caves, the Master, Erpin, and Ashur stumble upon a Suppression Unit extraction team led by Amelia, who claims that the wind elemental Sylla has kidnapped Elena and is holding her hostage at the top of Elemental Mountain. Immediately after Elena is found and freed, Sylla appears, announcing her intent to drive the elves from Elias. As Sylla gains the upper hand in a fight with the elves, an anonymous sniper incapacitates her from Monatium. Elena and Ashur theorize that Sylla was manipulated; a blue-lit phantom named Shaydi appears and declares herself responsible, having taken the idea from Fricle. Shaydi and Sylla leave, and Naia asks the Master for help convincing Sylla and Ifrit to cease hostilities.
7	"A Beating Should Do the Trick" (Korean: 빠따가 약이다)
Erpin, the Master, Ashur, and Suppression Unit Chief Canna journey to Phantom Marsh in search of Sylla and Shaydi. The four stumble upon the Chow Rebels role-playing with a phantom in a nun's habit, who has an ability that causes everyone except herself and the Master to perceive her as Ner (despite the discrepancies in her disguise). The Master threatens to tell Diana on the Chow Rebels and exposes the phantom, named Speaki, as an impostor, promptly ending the role-play. Speaki tells the group of another phantom with power rivalling Shaydi's that can transport them there: Rim, whose habit of making bad puns has led to ostracism by the other phantoms. Rim explains that each phantom is the manifestation of an abstract concept; she and Shaydi respectively serve as balance and chaos. After Rim transports the Master, Erpin, Ashur, and Canna to Shaydi's dimension, the five find themselves in a coliseum, where Shaydi has orchestrated a battle between them and a mind-controlled Sylla. Rim removes the thorned wristband controlling Sylla, and Shaydi and Rim fight, with Canna using Sylla's bow to turn the tide in Rim's favor. After Shaydi is defeated, Rim argues against her incarceration, lest another similarly powerful and chaotic phantom take her place. Back in Erpien, the Master, Erpin, and Ashur are reminded of the missing documents, which were stolen by Speaki to hone her impersonation of Ner.
8	"Power. House." (Korean: 파.워. 하우스)
The elementals have requested help from Erpin, as the underground creatures normally under Gabia's control have started tunnelling haphazardly due to the influence of an external music source, putting Elemental Mountain at risk of collapse. In the caves, the Master, Erpin, Ner, and Gabia encounter Sist, who leads them to the vault of a scholarly dragon named Jade and locks the five of them inside. The only way out is for Jade to dig to a cave occupied by ruby dragon Rudd; (Note: Despite the double-d spelling, the character's name is pronounced like the English rude.) due to the competitive, hierarchical might-makes-right nature of dragon society, Rudd views Jade's incursion on her territory as an invitation to a duel of physical fitness, the winner of which is granted Rudd's current second place in the hierarchy. Rudd assumes the others to be competing in the duel on Jade's behalf; Erpin bests Rudd with one set of 300 bench presses. Against the wishes of third-ranked sapphire dragon Silphir and Jade herself (who seeks a lifestyle outside the stresses of the hierarchy), Rudd awards Jade second place in the hierarchy. It thus becomes the responsibility of the non-dragons to restore Jade's place at the bottom of the hierarchy in return for her helping them find the source of the music. The group traces the music to a boombox planted by Sist at Fricle's behest, and follows Sist to the residence of first-ranked diamond dragon Daya, who has claimed possession of the boombox. Erpin challenges Daya to a round of "Elipoly", which she loses. Gabia destroys the boombox, and Daya expedites Jade's demotion by having her endure a strike from every dragon below her to formalize each change in rank.
9	"Last-Minute Comeback" (Korean: 막판 뒤집어버리기)
Ner, Erpin, Ashur, and the Master are standing idle in the forest outside Erpien, having just lost a high-stakes game of Elipoly. Sist appears and suggests invalidating the game due to the absence of representatives from Belitein, including Belita, prompting the others, Marie, and Mayo to venture into Belitein to search for the missing queen. The party finds Velvet, now a vagrant after her legitimacy as a witch was undermined by her failed Erpien coup. Velvet posits that Fricle has hidden Belita to usurp her throne, and allies with the party, claiming a preference to serve under Belita rather than Fricle. Following a lead of potion deliveries made to the palace's back door, Erpin, Ashur, and Velvet jump Fricle, but she corners the group and forces them inside the palace. Mayo notices something moving in her bag, revealed to be Coco. Upon witnessing Coco's effectiveness against Fricle's briars, Velvet steals it, betrays the group, and pursues Fricle. Erpin and the Master enter Belita's room and find her diary, which reveals that the witches were originally sprites who migrated underground to tend to the roots of Yggdrasil. Fricle enters the room; confronted by Erpin, she admits to orchestrating events to convince the races of Elias to ally with each other in light of a possible apocalypse. Erpin finds cookies under Belita's bed, leading the Master to theorize that Belita has a sweet tooth like her sister. The Master has Erpin trace the scent of sweets to a hidden pantry, where Belita is slumped on the floor. In the throne room, Velvet is challenged by Fricle and Erpin. Velvet attempts to counter with Coco, but is interrupted by explosives detonated by Marie that destroy the palace, and ultimately defeated by Erpin with help from Mayo and Ashur. After regaining consciousness, Belita immediately recognizes the human as the Master. The sprites and the Master return to Erpien to find it split between the phantoms, elementals, and dragons following the Elipoly game; a month of Elipoly rematches ensues until it is invalidated altogether as a means of arbitrating territories.
Interlude	"Remembrance & Prayer" (Korean: 회고와 기도)
Ner recounts her personal history with the Order to pyrite dragon Pira, from her exploitation of other sprites as a juvenile delinquent and her time as a junior Order priestess to her raising of a young Erpin. Later that evening, Ner falls into a deep sleep, where she relives her past in her dreams.

== Characters ==
=== Sprites ===
Erpin (에르핀; エルフィン)
Voiced by: Kang Eun-ae (Korean), Hina Kino (Japanese)
The gluttonous figurehead queen of the sprites. She boasts above-average physical aptitude but below-average intelligence. Erpin serves as the Master's usual sidekick in the main story.
Ner (네르; ネル)
Voiced by: Jeong Yoo-jeong (Korean), Yuriko Anderson (Japanese)
The current High Priestess of the Order of Yggdrasil and the power behind the throne of the Sprite Kingdom, having raised Erpin since childhood. Despite her constant nagging of Erpin, she cares deeply for her.
Ashur (에슈르; エシュール)
Voiced by: Jang Ye-na (Korean), Rena Nagao (Japanese)
A baker and magic tutor. Much to her frustration, she is recognized as a baker first and a magic teacher second.
Mayo (마요; マヨ)
Voiced by: Lee Da-eun (Korean), Yurie Funato (Japanese)
A pawnbroker and collector of stolen goods.

=== Werebeasts ===
Kommy (코미; コミー)
Voiced by: Kang Sae-bom (Korean), Maki Kawase (Japanese)
A smart yet lazy cat werebeast. Her name and references to a little red book she owns are puns on communism.
Butter (버터; バター)
Voiced by: Kang Sae-bom (Korean), Aoi Nagatsuki (Japanese)
A friendly dog werebeast who is prone to be taken advantage of due to her kindness.
Tig (티그; ティグ)
Voiced by: Kwak Gyu-mi (Korean), Minami Shinoda (Japanese)
A white tiger werebeast who leads the Chow Rebels and aims to succeed Diana as the leader of the werebeasts.
Rufo (루포; ルポ)
Voiced by: Park Si-yoon (Korean), Chisa Kimura (Japanese)
A cunning fox werebeast who serves as the Chow Rebels' strategist.
Beni (베니; ベニー)
Voiced by: Kang Sae-bom (Korean), Mana Kumasaki (Japanese)
A simple-minded but strong bear werebeast, and a member of the Chow Rebels.

=== Elves ===
Elena (엘레나; エレナ)
Voiced by: Kim Do-yeong (Korean), Yui Tsukada (Japanese)
The mayor of the elven city of Monatium and an avid engineer. She is primarily responsible for the elves' advanced technology and often uses her inventions to gain an underhanded advantage over the other races of Elias.
Amelia (아멜리아; アメリア)
Voiced by: Kim Ga-ryeong (Korean), Niina Nakabayashi (Japanese)
Elena's secretary, who harbors a secret obsession towards Elena.

=== Elementals ===
Sylla (실라; シーラ)
Voiced by: Jeong Hye-won (Korean), Saeko Oki (Japanese)
A standoffish wind elemental who leads the other elementals.

=== Phantoms ===
Shaydi (셰이디; シェイディ)
Voiced by: Kang Eun-ae (Korean), Rian Yamashiro (Japanese)
The phantom of chaos and the de facto leader of the phantoms. She delights in pulling large-scale pranks.
Speaki (스피키; スピッキー)
Voiced by: Park Si-yoon (Korean), Yurie Kozakai (Japanese)
A copycat phantom whose affinity for pumpkins and dressing up embodies the spirit of Halloween. Her current impersonation target is Ner.

== Development and release ==
Development began in 2019 under the name Roll the Chess; a beta was released the same year, which was negatively received and considered a failure by developer EPIDGames. However, the cheek-pulling interactions with the characters were praised. Therefore, the decision was made to remake the game with the chibi art style and cheek-pulling mechanic as a core aspect. The prototype of the game named Trickcal was first released on September 27, 2021. Due to the incomplete state of the game, with bugs such as payment errors and login failures, it was taken offline after just two hours. It was initially expected to be relaunched in October, but the two reworks nearly bankrupted EPIDGames until CEO Han Jeong-hyeon mortgaged his home for ₩1 billion (2021) (US$874,164.08) to raise funds. diyap, the lead artist and art director, left EPIDGames in early 2022 owing to health problems. The game was re-released in South Korea as Trickcal: Re:VIVE on September 27, 2023.

The global version of the game, developed by Bilibili Game, was announced in January 2025 during the 2025 Taipei Game Show. Originally also named Trickcal: Re:VIVE, it was changed to Trickcal: Chibi Go in May 2025. Pre-registration was also opened. A demo was featured at the 2025 Tokyo Game Show. It was released on October 9, 2025 on iOS and Android. The Chinese server was opened on December 18, 2025.

== Reception ==
The original 2021 release saw 50,000 concurrent players but negative reception, with comments like "the cheek-pulling was the only positive thing in the game".

The 2023 version of the game was well-received by players, and topped the list of "Korean mobile games we would love to see get a global launch" published by Pocket Gamer in 2024. It generated $4.5 million in the first year of the game's release. By August 2025, the Korean version of the game was downloaded 500,000 times, and had a five-star rating out of 35,000 reviews on Google Play Store. By April 9, 2026, the game was the fifth-highest grossing game in the Korean Google Play Store, and placed 11th and 13th in the Japanese Google Play Store and iOS App Store respectively.

=== Accolades ===
List of awards for Trickcal: Chibi Go
Year	Award	Category	Result	Ref.
2024	Korea Game Awards	Best Game Award	Won	

=== Internet memes ===
Speaki's Korean voice lines, such as joayo joayo (좋아요 좋아요; 'I like it, I like it') (Note: Transliterated in Japanese as chowayō chowayō (ﾁｮﾜﾖｰﾁｮﾜﾖｰ)) and Heueuaak! Seupiki meori jabadanggiji maseyo! (흐으아악! 스피키 머리 잡아당기지 마세요!; 'Aaaargh! Don't pull Speaki's hair!') (Note: Transliterated in Japanese as Uwaa! Supiki deruji baseyo! (ｳﾜｧｰ！ｽﾋﾟｷﾃﾞﾙｼﾞﾊﾞｾﾖ)) became viral as an internet meme in Japan following the game's global release, with players nicknaming the character "Spiki" (ｽﾋﾟｷ, Supiki; spelled in halfwidth katakana). Various otoMAD videos featuring Spiki were uploaded on sites like YouTube and Niconico Douga. Denfaminico Gamer called the meme the “strongest electronic drug”.

Raising Spiki (Note: Korean: 스피키 키우기; RR: Seupiki kiugi; Japanese: スピキ育成, romanized: Supiki Ikusei) is an unofficial browser-based MMO based on the character. It was released on August 6, 2026. In the game, players take on the role of Spiki and can hunt enemies in the field, including challenging bosses at altars with time limits, to acquire equipment or grow pumpkins in a pumpkin patch. It was officially recognized by EPIDGames after the company donated server hardware to the developer. The game became available on mobile on August 21, 2026.

== See also ==
- Princess Connect! Re:Dive, a Japanese auto battler RPG that inspired the Re:VIVE name
- Goddess of Victory: Nikke, a Korean game with a similar internet meme character
