= Kingdom Under Fire: Circle of Doom =

2007 video game

- Developer: Blueside (Note: Support development and supervision by Microsoft Game Studios Japan)
- Publisher: Microsoft Game Studios
- Director: Henry Lee
- Producer: Nobuya Okahara
- Designer: Henry Lee
- Programmers: Jong-Hwan Kim; Mitsuru Kitamura; Hideyuki Tsuji
- Artist: Se-In Yi
- Writer: Henry Lee
- Composer: Chris Rickwood
- Platform: Xbox 360
- Release: AU: December 5, 2007; NA: January 8, 2008; EU: February 1, 2008
- Genres: Action role-playing, hack and slash
- Modes: Single-player, multiplayer

Kingdom Under Fire: Circle of Doom is a 2007 action role-playing game developed by Blueside in partnership with Microsoft Game Studios Japan and published by Microsoft Game Studios for the Xbox 360. It is the fourth installment in the Kingdom Under Fire series. Chronologically the game's story follows Kingdom Under Fire: The Crusaders released in 2004. Unlike the previous Kingdom Under Fire games, Circle of Doom lacks the real-time strategy elements, with much of the gameplay focus being on hack and slash combat. A sequel, Kingdom Under Fire II, was released in 2019.

== Premise ==
The story begins when Nibel The Lord of Light made a pact with Encablossa Lord of Darkness, the pact being that each lord will rule his age and the other will wait until the other finishes his rule. But eons pass and Nibel grows weary of seeing his creatures becoming monsters and being tortured so when the Age of Light was about to end Nibel didn't give his rule to Encablossa. Encablossa was angry so he gathered his Dark Legion and attacked the world, many ages pass but in Crusaders, Walter's soldiers destroyed the ancient heart (a powerful relic and the center of the conflict in 'Kingdom Under Fire') and Encablossa appeared in the form of a great demon, but he is defeated by Kendal and Regnier's forces but the heroes then become trapped in Encablossa's Dimension as old heroes. In Regnier's campaign it is explained that the dark dimension is about to explode with the resulting blast poised to consume both dimensions.

== Gameplay ==
Unlike the previous instalments in the Kingdom Under Fire series, Circle of Doom is entirely a hack and slash role-play, much in the vein of dungeon crawlers and focuses entirely on the player's chosen character out of five (sixth can be unlocked), thus lacking the real-time strategy formula of the previous games. Much of the gameplay revolves around close quarter combat with multiple AI controlled opponents throughout each level. As the player progresses with each kill, they gain experience that eventually leads to gaining a level, the maximum being level 120. Each time the player levels up they receive a given number of experience points to boost their overall health, skill points and luck. Higher-level players will also be able to wield better weapons and armour and allow more options for magic use. Levels are also generated at random, with differing paths and amount of foes between each (while foes are still confined to certain areas) and destructible environments with the use of heavier weapons.

While the player has a standard health bar, the skill points forms another (SP bar) that when the player performs an attack or uses magic, their SP becomes depleted and recovers when nothing is performed, so the player will be unable to attack if there isn't enough SP at that moment of use. The more SP and the faster rate it can recover allow longer chains of attacks. The Luck skill determines the quantity and quality of loot and gold dropped by slain foes. The Luck skill can also help in the game's "synthesis" system, one which lets players pay gold combine items to improve one, for example combining a powerful weapon with a weaker one will result in its overall attack power being somewhere in between, with enchantments from both also present. Luck improves the chances of a successful synthesis along with a larger investment of gold.

Items can also be bought and sold when the player encounters an Idol in each level that serves as buyers and sellers of various items. There are three different Idols in total; Death, Love and Greed who excel more in certain items than others who appear at certain times of the in game's "moon phases". The Idol also provides a safe sanctuary where foes cannot enter, thus allowing players to "sleep". When the player sleeps, they appear in the dream world where they interact with other characters who progress the story by providing quests, insight and allowing players to learn new skills, most usually requiring a certain number of particular foes to be killed. Magic and weapons can assigned to 4 commands buttons on the Xbox 360 controller at any given time, X and A buttons for use of weapons/attack and B and the right trigger for use of magic. Potions that can quickly boost health and SP or cure magic affects inflicted by enemies can be applied to the left and right bumper buttons. The player also has Accessory slots where armour and stat increasing jewellery are applied for effect, more being available for purchase from Idols.

The game features three difficulty levels; Normal, Hard and Extreme that differ between the strength of foes, but however only Normal can be played to begin with and the other difficulties are unlocked by completing Normal (then Hard for Extreme mode) and are only playable with the character that unlocked them.

Circle of Doom also allows up to four players to play through each level and corresponding boss fights over Xbox Live. This allows joining players to play through levels they have yet to progress to as long as the host has = players that receive items and experience online will still reap the benefit for their character offline at the same time, thus allowing players to trade items and complete quests with others but foes toughness increases the more players there are. The Xbox Live headset is also supported for use.

== Reception ==
Reception

Aggregate score
Aggregator	Score
Metacritic	55/100

Review scores
Publication	Score
Edge	4/10
Eurogamer	5/10
Famitsu	(X360) 31/40; 29/40
Game Informer	5.25/10
GameDaily	5/10
GameRevolution	D
GameSpot	6/10
GameSpy	2.5/5
GameTrailers	5.9/10
IGN	5.8/10
Official Xbox Magazine (US)	8/10
RPGamer	1/5
RPGFan	50%
VideoGamer.com	6/10

Upon release, Circle of Doom received "mixed" reviews according to the review aggregation website Metacritic. In Japan, where the game was ported for release on December 13, 2007, Famitsu gave it a score of 29 out of 40, while Famitsu X360 gave it a score of one eight, one seven, and two eights for a total of 31 out of 40.

Official Xbox Magazine praised the game, enjoying the lack of RTS elements of its predecessors, delivering a more "straight-up combo-heavy hack-and-slash action" that "manages to look lovely while you slap around your foes." GameZone gave it 6.5 out of 10, saying, "Circle of Doom represents a different path from the rest of the series, but without the strategy elements that made the original games so fun, this entry feels like a repetitive button-masher more than a standout entry to the KUF franchise." However, GamePro said, "The lone bright spot comes in the form of four player cooperative play via Xbox Live, though collectively sharing the disappointment of this game is like tasting a nasty drink then passing it to your buddies to offer them a sip. No matter how you slice it, Circle of Doom just doesn't have any appeal." (Note: GamePro gave the game 3/5 for graphics, two 1/5 scores for sound and control, and 2/5 for fun factor.)

A common criticism was directed at the basic gameplay causing repetition. GameSpot found that while "slicing your way through the hordes is as compelling as you would expect from the genre", being "a proven one", the "action gets incredibly repetitive". They however noted that the online co-op over Xbox Live "can increase the entertainment value significantly". GameSpy also felt disappointed over the "minimal amount of direct character customization" and felt the skill points player stat would be the "most annoying aspect of the game for button-mashers".

On the game's story, GameTrailers found it "vague" and IGN felt it was more of a way of providing simple variety in character choice that "you feel a bit like you're playing a separate adventure rather than just a new character" yet found the dialogue "cheesy" and "comical". They did however find the soundtrack to be one of its highest points, being "a reasonably powerful soundtrack that chimes in when moments of action are about to transpire". Eurogamer however thought it was an "insanely inappropriate repetitive metal guitar noodling".
