= Dokkaebi (disambiguation) =

Dokkaebi are legendary creatures from Korean mythology and folklore.

Dokkaebi may also refer to:

== Drama ==
- Dokkaebi, also known as English title Guardian: The Lonely and Great God, 2016 South Korean TV series

== Novel ==
- Dokkaebi, Korean novel series

== Game ==
- Dokkaebi, a character that appears in the video game Tom Clancy's Rainbow Six Siege
- DokeV, a South Korean video game developed by Pearl Abyss

== Art ==
- Tokebi, Guatemalan artist and illustrator.
