= DokeV =

Upcoming video game

- Developer: Pearl Abyss
- Publisher: Pearl Abyss
- Director: Daeil Kim
- Producer: Sangyoung Kim
- Engine: BlackSpace
- Platform: Windows
- Release: 2028
- Genre: Action-adventure
- Modes: Single-player, multiplayer

DokeV (Korean: 도깨비) is a creature-collecting open world action-adventure game that is being developed by Pearl Abyss. The game revolves around characters who find Dokebi, creatures that gain strength from people's dreams, and embark on adventures together.

== Development ==
DokeV is being developed with Pearl Abyss founder Daeil Kim as executive producer and Sangyoung Kim, who was a lead Black Desert Online animator, as lead producer.

The game was announced as Project V. On November 7, 2019, it was revealed as DokeV with trailer. The next week on November 14, 2019, DokeV's announcement trailer was revealed for the first time at Pearl Abyss Connect 2019, which took place at G-STAR 2019 in South Korea. The next month on December 5, 2019, the reveal trailer's original soundtrack ROCKSTAR and accompanying lyric video, as well as new screenshot, were revealed.

On August 25, 2021, DokeV's first gameplay trailer made its world premiere at Gamescom: Opening Night Live.

As of October 2024, Pearl Abyss expected to release DokeV no earlier than 2027, "around 18 months after Crimson Desert's launch."

In May 2026, Pearl Abyss reported that DokeV was in pre-production and resources were being prioritized to accelerate its development. The company announced that it aimed to release a new title every two to three years, indicating a target release window of 2028 or 2029.
