= Kingdom Under Fire: A War of Heroes =

2001 video game

- Developer: Phantagram
- Publisher: Gathering of Developers
- Platform: Windows
- Release: NA: 16 January 2001; EU: 18 January 2001
- Genre: Real-time strategy
- Modes: Single-player, multiplayer

Kingdom Under Fire: A War of Heroes is a real-time strategy video game developed by Phantagram and published by Gathering of Developers. Released for Windows in 2001, the game is based in a high fantasy setting and is played from an overhead isometric perspective. The game included single-player and multiplayer online modes through Phantagram's Wargate server. The game is the first release in the Kingdom Under Fire series, which later received critical acclaim through the Xbox release Kingdom Under Fire: The Crusaders, a game which, like others in the series, incorporated both role-playing and real-time strategy elements. A "Gold Patch" was released for Kingdom Under Fire which introduced a map editor, extra missions, and in-game save option; this version was also re-released as Kingdom Under Fire Gold.

== Gameplay ==
Two factions, light and dark, are playable in the game, with each side having units fulfilling the typical roles of warrior, archer, flying unit and wizards – as well as more powerful individual hero characters. The campaigns are split into 13 missions of which 10 are battles and the other three being a dungeon crawl for a hero character. Skirmish and multiplayer modes were also supported, with online games with human opponents organized via the Wargate.Net server.

== Plot ==
Kingdom Under Fire is set in the fantasy land of Bersia and covers the struggle between the forces of light (Humans, Dwarves, and Elves) and the forces of dark (Ogres, Orcs, Undead, and others). One hundred years before the events of the game, an epic war was waged between the two forces until finally a legendary group known as the Knights of Xok defeated the forces of dark and brought peace to the land of Bersia.

== Development ==
The game was announced in January 2000.

== Reception ==
Reception

Aggregate score
Aggregator	Score
Metacritic	59/100

Review scores
Publication	Score
AllGame	4.5/5
CNET Gamecenter	4/10
Computer Games Strategy Plus	2/5
Computer Gaming World	1/5
EP Daily	4/10
Eurogamer	6/10
Game Informer	6.25/10
GameRevolution	C
GameSpot	5.5/10
GameSpy	75%
GameZone	7/10
IGN	7.2/10
Next Generation	3/5
PC Gamer (US)	70%

The game received mixed reviews according to the review aggregation website Metacritic. The hero missions were unfavourably compared with Blizzard's Diablo games. The difficulty was claimed to be too high by some reviewers, with hero units unbalanced and the game's AI also found lacking. The game's graphics were considered good or passable, though the animations limited, but the audio and story were praised by critics. John Lee of NextGen said, "A potential treasure cruise for gamers, Kingdom misses the boat by a hair."

The game sold 20,000 units in the U.S. by October 2001.

== Sequels ==
Several sequels to the game have been released:

- Kingdom Under Fire: The Crusaders, a 2004 tactical wargame developed by the Korean studio Phantagram for the Xbox
- Kingdom Under Fire: Heroes, a 2005 action strategy game, the prequel to Kingdom Under Fire: The Crusaders
- Kingdom Under Fire: Circle of Doom, a 2007 action roleplaying video game developed by Blueside
- Kingdom Under Fire II, a hybrid real-time strategy and roleplaying massively multiplayer online game

Upcoming:

- Kingdom Under Fire: The Rise, an upcoming roleplaying massively multiplayer online NFT game
