= Crimson Desert =

2026 video game

- Developer: Pearl Abyss
- Publisher: Pearl Abyss
- Platforms: macOS; PlayStation 5; Windows; Xbox Series X/S; Nintendo Switch 2
- Release: March 19, 2026
- Genre: Action-adventure
- Mode: Single-player

Crimson Desert (Note: Korean: 붉은사막; RR: Bulgeun samak) is a 2026 action-adventure game developed and published by Pearl Abyss. Originally planned as a prequel to Black Desert Online, the game evolved into a standalone title during development. It was released for macOS, PlayStation 5, Windows, and Xbox Series X/S on March 19, 2026, with a Nintendo Switch 2 version planned for release in the first half of 2027. It received generally positive reviews and sold three million copies within the first week of release.

== Gameplay ==
Crimson Desert is an action-adventure game set in the open-world fictional continent of Pywel, a high fantasy world affected by multiple conflicts and mysterious forces. Players initially control Kliff, a member of the Greymanes, as he navigates a landscape populated by rival factions and dangerous creatures. The game features a dynamic combat system powered by the proprietary BlackSpace Engine, combining combo attacks, environmental traversal, and magic. Players can engage in horseback combat, face large-scale bosses such as dragons, and utilize a wide array of weapons and abilities enhanced with elemental effects. Pywel's open world offers a variety of activities including fishing, cooking, crafting, and hunting, allowing players to engage with the world beyond battles. The developers intended the world to be seamless and immersive, encouraging exploration and interaction with its inhabitants and environments.

== Plot ==
The narrative of Crimson Desert follows Kliff and his fellow Greymanes—Oongka, Yann, Naira, and others—during a period of conflict on the continent of Pywel. The fragile balance is disrupted by a devastating attack on the Greymanes by their sworn enemies and rival faction, the Black Bears. During the ensuing conflict, many members of the Greymanes are killed, and Kliff, along with the surviving members, are scattered. The story focuses on Kliff's journey to reunite with his comrades, rebuild the fallen Greymanes, and confront the Black Bears' leader, Myurdin.

== Development and release ==
Crimson Desert was developed by Pearl Abyss, the creator of Black Desert Online and Shadow Arena. The development started in early 2018, and like Pearl Abyss' other games, it was developed in the company's proprietary game engine. The game was first unveiled through the developer's earning reports in early 2019 under the codename Project CD. It was officially announced as the current title at G-Star 2019.

The game was originally conceived as a prequel to Black Desert Online; however, during early development, Pearl Abyss gradually reimagined it as a single-player experience set in a separate universe and established as a distinct, non-continuous IP. The game has since been marketed as single-player only, with no plans for multiplayer integration. The Pearl Abyss team took inspiration from Sicily, Italy, to build the game world; the goal was to study the historical architecture and unique natural landscapes to give depth to the continent of Pywel. In December 2020, after the release of the trailer at The Game Awards 2020, Pearl Abyss released commentary videos to explain the development of the game and their vision for it. The game uses an upgraded version of Black Desert Online's proprietary game engine called BlackSpace Engine.

The team created a custom XML scripting system to facilitate the pipeline, allowing non-programmers to parse data more quickly than when using scripting language like Python and Lua. The development took 7 years overall. Pearl Abyss released a free, non-downloadable 20-minute demo for the game on Twitch on September 1, 2026. It is played via Amazon GameLift Streams, a cloud gaming service utilising the servers of Amazon Web Services. Crimson Desert was released for macOS, PlayStation 5, Windows, and Xbox Series X/S on March 19, 2026.

=== Downloadable content ===
During a Sony State of Play live presentation held on September 3, 2026, a DLC expansion titled Charting the Unknown was announced. The expansion follows Kliff as he travels beyond Pywel's shores aboard a ship alongside companions Oongka and Damiane. It adds new content, such as additional mechs, naval combat, underwater exploration, and expanded housing features using the game's base-building system. The expansion was originally set to be released on October 15, 2026, but got delayed by two weeks and released on October 30 of the same year.

== Reception ==
=== Critical response ===
Reception

Aggregate scores
Aggregator	Score
Metacritic	(PC) 77/100 (PS5) 77/100
OpenCritic	74% recommend (Note: Based on 134 reviews)

Review scores
Publication	Score
Destructoid	8.5/10
Eurogamer	3/5
Game Informer	7/10
GameSpot	7/10
GamesRadar+	4/5
IGN	6/10
PC Gamer (UK)	80/100
Shacknews	5/10
TechRadar	4/5

According to the review aggregator website Metacritic, Crimson Desert received "generally favorable reviews". Destructoid found the game addictive, albeit with some rough edges, calling it "impossible to put down once you get going". Press Start was pleasantly surprised, acknowledging it as "imperfect" yet "impressive enough to be within striking distance of the juggernauts of [the] genre." Finding it a "fascinating journey" and a "jack of all trades", PC Gamer praised the game's scale, though acknowledged an imbalance of quality in some areas. Some critics were able to find enjoyment in some aspects but were let down by others, labelled as "laser-targeted at the current demands of the attention economy" by Eurogamer. While Shacknews remained able to find a lot to like, they ultimately felt that it was too large and ambitious for its own good.

Combat in the game was often seen as Crimson Desert's most interesting and impressive feature. Checkpoint Gaming noticed a "huge amount of player expression" in each playable character's moveset, enjoying subtle contextual differences in animations, but finding the initial learning curve rough. Combat was also praised for its freedom of expression by GameSpot and they were pleased by the absence of basic stat upgrades in the skill tree in favor of new attacks. Despite finding a lot of flaws with the game overall, Eurogamer generally appreciated the "killer combat", aside from the lock-on system. IGN took issue with the average fight length, finding that combat dragged on for too long with too many enemies, particularly outside of major story quests where it felt unwarranted. GamesRadar+ took a different stance, believing that large groups were where combat was at its best, due to the amount of variety and options.

==== Story ====
Reviewers usually found faults with the game's story. IGN and Eurogamer both criticised the narrative, along with its characters, with the former calling the story "aimless" and the dialogue "hard to listen to", while the latter saw it as an underdeveloped afterthought. GamesRadar+ suggested that the game was "better as a sandbox than as a story", a similar sentiment to the one shared by Checkpoint Gaming, who warned against player expectations of a deep RPG with a cohesive story. Windows Central said the story shined through set-pieces, yet was a "jumbled mess" overall. On the other hand, TechRadar thought the story was engaging, with characters they were able to grow attached to and a plot that left them wondering how it would continue, and ComicBook.com called the game a "masterclass in layered storytelling".

The game's world was praised by most critics for its beauty and scale, along with the technical work behind it. Digital Spy said the world was beautiful visually, and praised the tempting exploration, which Gamereactor wrote was almost unparallelled, comparing it to Death Stranding 2: On the Beach and the Legend of Zelda series. From a technical perspective, Game Informer was impressed by how the entire world was rendered as a whole, and could be seen all at once from high points. PC Gamer mentioned the lack of performance issues, which surprised them, considering how much seemed to happen in the world at once. When discussing the immersion, IGN found the world to feel somewhat flat and not reactive enough, despite it being "absolutely gorgeous" visually and one of the most impressive parts of the game.

A few critics noted frustrations with the game's controls, with them being called "wonky", "overloaded", and "clunky". Checkpoint Gaming noted in particular that they often felt lacking in precision, feeling like the main reason for a lot of their mistakes in gameplay. While Digital Spy agreed that it can take time to adjust to, they cite the controls as a strength, allowing for freedom in movement. Also a subject of criticism was the inventory system at launch, with Gamereactor saying it "may be the worst inventory system in the history of video games". Several critics complained about the lack of slots to carry things in, compounded by the large number of different items they found themselves encouraged to carry, especially at the start of the game before more inventory slots are gained. IGN noted that the game received a storage box mechanic in a post-launch update to help ease the issue.

=== Sales ===
On March 20, 2026, Pearl Abyss announced that Crimson Desert had surpassed 2 million units sold within its first 24 hours. Less than 3 months after its release, Crimson Desert surpassed 6 million copies sold worldwide.

=== Controversies ===
==== Intel GPU support ====
Immediately after the game's release, many gamers and media outlets noted that Crimson Desert explicitly does not support Intel Arc GPUs. The title's developer, Pearl Abyss, suggests that affected users refund the game at the place of purchase. After the issue became publicized, Intel commented on the situation, stating that they had contacted Pearl Abyss multiple times and offered access to early hardware, software, and drivers, as well as help optimizing the game so it would support Intel's GPUs at launch. Intel also suggested contacting Pearl Abyss directly for details on their decision not to support Arc.

After initial backlash, Pearl Abyss changed FAQ page on game's website, stating that they are "working on compatibility and optimization support so that Crimson Desert can also be enjoyed on Intel Arc GPU systems". The developer also apologized "for any confusion our FAQ wording from several hours ago regarding playability on Intel Arc GPUs may have caused", and provided a patch which allowed the game to launch on some Intel Arc GPUs in an unoptimized state, with players mentioning frequent graphical issues and general instability. Pearl Abyss provided no information regarding when they will introduce full support for the platform.

==== Generative AI use ====
Following the game's release, players identified several in-game assets—specifically paintings and signs—that appeared to be created using generative AI. This led to criticism regarding Pearl Abyss's failure to disclose the use of AI on the game's Steam page, which requires such disclosures under Valve's content policies. In response, Pearl Abyss issued an apology for what it termed "oversights", stating that the assets were "unintentionally included" in the final release build. Pearl Abyss claimed that they used generative AI "as part of early-stage iteration" to "explore tone and atmosphere in the earlier phases of production". The studio announced it would conduct a "comprehensive audit" of the game's assets and pledged to replace any generative AI content with human-made artwork in a future update.

== Accolades ==
=== Awards and nominations ===
Year	Award	Category	Recipient(s)	Result	Ref.
2026	China Game Innovation Awards	Best International Game Award	Crimson Desert	Won	
2026	Develop:Star Awards	Best Technical Innovation	Crimson Desert	Won	
2026	Gamescom Awards	Most Epic	Crimson Desert	Nominated	
2026	Gamescom Awards	Best PC Game	Crimson Desert	Nominated	
2026	The Game Awards 2026	Best Community Support	Crimson Desert	Pending	
2026	Golden Joystick Awards 2026	Ultimate Game of the Year	Crimson Desert	Nominated	
2026	Golden Joystick Awards 2026	PC Game of the Year	Crimson Desert	Won	
2026	Golden Joystick Awards 2026	Best Soundtrack	Crimson Desert	Nominated	
2026	Korea Game Awards	Grand Prize (Presidential Award)	Crimson Desert	Won	
2026	Korea Game Awards	Technical & Creative Award – Planning & Scenario	Crimson Desert	Won	
2026	Korea Game Awards	Technical & Creative Award – Graphics	Crimson Desert	Won	
2026	Korea Game Awards	Technical & Creative Award – Character	Crimson Desert	Won	
2026	Korea Game Awards	Technical & Creative Award – Sound	Crimson Desert	Won	
2026	Korea Game Awards	Global Game Award	Crimson Desert	Won	
2026	Korea Game Awards	Popular Voice Actor Award	Lee Hyun	Won	
2026	Korea Game Awards	Outstanding Developer Award	Jo Yong-hyun	Won	
2026	TIGA Awards 2026	Best Action & Adventure Game	Crimson Desert	Won	
2026	World Soundtrack Awards	Game Music Award	Hwiman Ryu, Inro Joo, Hyoung Woo Roh, Jiyoon Kim, Dongjune Oh	Nominated	
