= Devsisters =

South Korean video game developer

Devsisters Corporation
- The current Devsisters CI, adopted in 2010.
- Type: Public
- Traded as: KRX: 194480
- Industry: Video games
- Founded: 2007; 19 years ago (as Extra Standard); 2009; 17 years ago (as Moblier Corp.)
- Headquarters: Seoul, South Korea
- Area served: Globally
- Key people: Ji-hoon Lee (CEO); Jong-heun Kim (Co-CEO); Minwoo-Ryu (CSO)
- Owner: Ji-Hoon Lee (27.4%)
- Number of employees: approx. 300 (2025)
- Website: devsisters.com

Devsisters Corporation (Korean: 데브시스터즈 주식회사; logo stylized as DEVSISTERS) is a South Korean company focusing on manufacturing and developing mobile entertainment and gaming apps founded in 2007. Currently, Devsisters is widely known as the developer of Cookie Run, using popular instant messaging platforms, such as KakaoTalk and LINE.

== History ==
=== Before Devsisters: 2007–2009 ===
Devsisters co-founder and co-CEO Ji-hoon Lee founded the company Extra Standard together with others in 2007 with the goal of developing edutainment software. However, due to the lack of capital, the company found itself doing mostly contract work for big businesses, and Lee decided to abandon that line of business. Up until 2013, Devsisters was described as a start-up founded in 2009, but starting with the company's preparation of going public on the KOSDAQ index, it was established that Extra Standard had been renamed to Moblier Corp. and later to Devsisters.

=== Early years: 2009–2012 ===
Operation under the name Moblier began on January 2, 2009, and was led by Ji-hoon Lee (CEO), Se-joong Kim (COO) and Min-woo Ryu (CSO). The name Dev Sisters (as two words) was initially used as a brand name on the company's mobile apps, until it was officially renamed to Devsisters in April 2010.

Moblier was one of the earliest companies in Korea to approach the new iPhone App Store platform after its introduction in July 2008. Because the iPhone was not available in Korea at the time of the company's inception and a game category was not introduced to the Korean App Store until 2011, the company initially targeted an international audience.

In its early days, the company also developed utility and entertainment apps before shifting its focus to the creation of video games due to the success of the early title OvenBreak, which was downloaded more than 10 million times and became ranked as the most popular free app on the App Store in 20 different countries by 2011.

Co-founder and COO Sejoong Kim left the company in January 2010 to found Jellybus. Minwoo Ryu likewise left the company in May 2012. In March 2011, Jongheun Kim joined the company as Co-CEO.

In 2010, Devsisters received its first investment of 1 billion Korean won from Com2Us. Another investment of 4 billion won by Soft Bank Ventures and MVP Capital followed in June 2011. The company started to grow rapidly, from 10 employees to 52 within one year, and by June 2012, the company had 64 employees. Despite the investments and increased staff, Devsisters could not repeat the success of OvenBreak between 2010 and 2012. The Bell named Devsisters as an example of a mobile game developer where investments had not paid off. By 2013, the company was described as a team of merely 12 members.

=== Cookie Run era: 2013–2015 ===
Only after shifting its focus onto the Korean market, Devsisters saw its biggest success yet with Cookie Run, a spiritual successor to the OvenBreak series released on April 2, 2013, via the messaging app Kakao Talk. It became the #1 top-grossing game on Google Play and #6 top-grossing game on the App Store in May that year, which caused Devsisters to rank #10 among "Top Publishers by Monthly Game Revenue" worldwide on Google Play, according to the Website App Annie. Within 12 weeks, the game was downloaded 10 million times as the seventh game to reach that number on Kakao Game. By April 2014, the number of downloads had grown to 20 million in Korea alone. With Cookie Run, Devsisters generated 61.7 billion Korean won in annual sales and 22.3 billion won in net profits in 2013.

On January 29, 2014, LINE Corporation launched Cookie Run globally (except China and South Korea), with translations into Chinese (Traditional), English, Japanese, Spanish and Thai. LINE Cookie Run surpassed 10 million downloads within 30 days of release, earning the #1 rank among free apps on the App Store in Cambodia, Hong Kong, Indonesia, Japan, Laos, Macao, Singapore, Taiwan, and Thailand. The game was especially successful in the latter two countries, where it held the top spot for 13 days. As of April 4, 2014, LINE Cookie Run surpassed 20 million downloads.

At the height of the game's popularity, both versions combined accumulated roughly 10 million daily active users. In April 2016, around the game's three year anniversary, Devsisters celebrated 55 million accumulated downloads for LINE Cookie Run and 26 million for Cookie Run for Kakao.

Devsisters had also signed a deal with the Chinese publisher iDreamsky in 2013. iDreamsky announced the game would be published in China via the messaging app WeChat later in 2014. However, during a month-long open beta phase that started in December 2014 with 16,000 players, the game did not meet requirements made by platform owner Tencent and thus the service was cancelled. Devsisters announced that it would move its efforts towards other platforms and an expansion onto the Chinese market with the upcoming sequel.

Due to the success of Cookie Run, Devsisters' yearly revenue rose from 800 million Korean Won in 2011 to 61.7 billion in 2013.

In October 2013, NHN Entertainment announced the purchase of a 22% share in Devsisters at 5.6 billion Won, 7.4% of which were bought by earlier investor Com2Us, who had previously owned 14.8%. NHN Entertainment stated that they expected a "great synergy between the two companies through joint marketing or development". The relationship led to NHN Entertainment publishing the puzzle game Cookie Run Munjil Munjil, a rebranded version of Disney Tsum Tsum, on May 27, 2014.

On September 21, 2014, Devsisters announced its initial public offering of 2,700,000 shares at 53,000 won per share to be traded under the symbol of "194480" on the KOSDAQ Stock market on October 6. In May 2015, the company announced the establishment of its own subsidiary, the startup investment company Devsisters Ventures.

=== Sequel development: 2015–present ===
In late 2014, an analyst for Yuanta Securities mentioned in an evaluation of Devsisters: "There's too much dependency on a single game, which is the biggest risk for the company". By 2015, the popularity of Cookie Run began to wane, resulting in Devsisters' revenue dropping to 19.5 billion Korean Won for that year. In April 2015, Devsisters announced the development of a sequel, tentatively named Cookie Run 2, to be launched globally in the second half of that year. Later the planned release date was stated more precisely for December. A researcher described the development process as "slow, but on track". However, on November 6, Devsisters announced that the game would be delayed.

Under the title Cookie Run: OvenBreak, the sequel was finally soft-launched on the Apple App Store and Google Play in Canada, Australia, Hong Kong, Philippines, Netherlands, and Sweden on September 27, 2016. On October 5, it was announced that the game would be published globally (with the exception of China) on the 27th of that month.

By April 14, 2017, Devsisters had released their first non-cookie-based hit, Tape It Up! On January 21, 2021, they also released the RPG city-simulator project by the name of Cookie Run: Kingdom. This latest entry is a spinoff to the main series, which is also the most successful. The popularity extended after having a crossover with Sonic the Hedgehog on September 17 for the franchise's 30th anniversary.

On November 10, 2021, Devsisters announced their plan to incorporate Non-fungible token (NFT)-based services into their future projects. The announcement was panned by fans, who demonstrated their opposition to the plans mainly due to the environmental impact related to NFTs and blockchain technology. Many fans used the hashtag #StopCookieRunNFTs to express their discontent; the hashtag became trending on Twitter. On November 15, 2021, Devsisters released a statement on Twitter, saying that "[the company] strongly valued the opinions" and that it "will review any issues raised by the community", stating that the company will never "partake in activities that are fundamentally against our values".

== Awards and accolades ==
- 2013 Korea Game Awards – Best Characters – Cookie Run
- Korea Brand Power 2015 – Online Game Rank 3
- Technology Fast 500 Asia Pacific (APAC) 2015 (Deloitte Touche Tohmatsu) – Winner

== Products ==
=== Games ===
Game	Details
Obey! Original release date(s): April 29, 2009	Release years by system: iOS (2009)
iRodeo Original release date(s): June 6, 2009	Release years by system: iOS (2009)
iRodeo Original release date(s): June 6, 2009	Notes: Ranked within the Appstore top 10 in Italy, Germany, France and Spain in 2010
OvenBreak Original release date(s): June 15, 2009	Release years by system: iOS (2009); Android (2011)
OvenBreak Original release date(s): June 15, 2009	Notes: Received several major updates 2009-2012; Most downloaded free app in 20 countries, including the US, in 2011. Downloaded more than 10 million times by 2011 and 20 million times by 2013
Alice's Adventures: Rabbit Hole of Death Original release date(s): September 29, 2009	Release years by system: iOS (2009)
Alice's Adventures: Rabbit Hole of Death Original release date(s): September 29, 2009	Notes: Ranked third most popular paid game in Japan in 2010.
Pandadog's Pizza Original release date(s): December 19, 2009	Release years by system: iOS (2009)
Pandadog's Pizza Original release date(s): December 19, 2009	Notes: Pandadog licensed by Funnyeve
RunAway Original release date(s): December 23, 2009	Release years by system: Web (Nate Appstore, 2009)
RunAway Original release date(s): December 23, 2009	Notes: First 3D social web game in Korea
Dark Shrine Original release date(s): March 9, 2010	Release years by system: iOS (2010)
Dark Shrine Original release date(s): March 9, 2010	Notes: Created in cooperation with Hotdog Studio
Burglar Buster Original release date(s): May 18, 2010 (2010)	Release years by system: iOS
Get THAT Mish! / Fishing for Mish Original release date(s): March 22, 2012	Release years by system: iOS (2012)
Oh! My Lord Original release date(s): July 12, 2012	Release years by system: iOS (2012)
OvenBreak 2 Original release date(s): December 11, 2012	Release years by system: iOS (2012)
OvenBreak 2 Original release date(s): December 11, 2012	Notes: Discontinuation of service announced on December 11, 2013
Cookie Run Original release date(s): April 2, 2013	Release years by system: iOS (2013), Android (2013)
Cookie Run Original release date(s): April 2, 2013	Notes: International version LINE Cookie Run published by Line Corporation on January 29, 2014; Downloaded more than 87 million times globally
Solitaire: Decked Out Original release date(s): October 10, 2016	Release years by system: iOS (2016), Android (2016)
Cookie Run: OvenBreak Original release date(s): October 27, 2016	Release years by system: iOS (2016), Android (2016)
Cookie Run: OvenBreak Original release date(s): October 27, 2016	Notes: Soft launch in Australia, Canada, Hong Kong, Philippines, Netherlands, and Sweden on September 27, 2016
Tape it Up! Original release date(s): April 14, 2017	Release years by system: iOS (2017)
CookieWars Original release date(s): August 23, 2018	Release years by system: iOS (2018), Android (2018)
CookieWars Original release date(s): August 23, 2018	Notes: Soft launch in Canada, Hong Kong, and Thailand on July 26, 2018
Hello! Brave Cookies Original release date(s): 2019	Release years by system: 2019
Cookie Run: Puzzle World Original release date(s): January 16, 2020	Release years by system: iOS (2020), Android (2020)
Cookie Run: Kingdom Original release date(s): January 21, 2021	Release years by system: iOS (2021), Android (2021)
Brixity Original release date(s): August 24, 2023	Release years by system: iOS (2023), Android (2023)
Brixity Original release date(s): August 24, 2023	Notes: Discontinuation of service announced on December 30, 2025.
CookieRun: Witch's Castle Original release date(s): March 15, 2024	Release years by system: iOS & Android (2024)
CookieRun: Tower of Adventures Original release date(s): June 26, 2024	Release years by system: iOS & Android (2024)
CookieRun: OvenSmash Original release date(s): March 26, 2026	Release years by system: iOS & Android (2026)

=== Other apps ===
Besides video games, Devsisters developed and published a variety of other apps for entertainment and utility purposes for the iOS App Store. These include iFan (April 14, 2009), iWhack (April 14, 2009), Smart Timetable (June 15, 2009), Angelizer (October 1, 2009), Giffle (May 27, 2010), and Avatar World (February 4, 2011). On December 14, 2010, it was also announced that Devsisters would publish the social music app for Galaxy tablets Pokem, by KAIST student Jeong-seok Lee, on Korean app market spaces.
