= Pauline Kana =

American social media personality (born 1926)

- Kana in 2026
- Born: Pauline Ann Bodnar; August 1, 1926 (age 100); Columbus, Ohio, U.S.
- Occupations: Media personality; TikToker; Factory worker; Baker
- Years active: 2012–present
- Spouse: Edward James Kana (m. 1955; died 1988)
- Awards: Guinness World Record

Pauline Ann Kana (née Bodnar; born August 1, 1926) is an American social media personality, widely known as "Gangster Granny" for her comedic videos with her grandson Ross Smith. She became famous in her 90s and 100s for defying stereotypes of aging, appearing in humorous skits, attending pop culture events, and even setting a Guinness World Record as the oldest person to crowd surf.

== Early life ==
Pauline Ann Bodnar was born in Ohio on August 1, 1926. She grew up during the Great Depression and worked in a factory building bombs during World War II. Later, she married and spent most of her life working in factories, stores, and a bakery.

== Career ==
Kana's fame began when her grandson, Ross Smith, started filming short comedy videos with her around 2012. Their clips, often featuring her in outrageous or playful scenarios, quickly went viral across platforms like Instagram, TikTok, and YouTube. She became known for her bold personality, often flipping off the camera, wearing humorous outfits, and interacting with celebrities.In May 2026, she crowd-surfed at a Brantley Gilbert concert in Texas, earning a Guinness World Record as the oldest person ever to crowd surf. She has tens of millions of followers across social media, making her one of the most recognizable elderly internet personalities.

On TikTok, Kana's account has more than 26,000 followers and over 1.3 million likes. On Instagram, she regularly appears in Ross Smith's posts, many of which reach millions of views. On YouTube, Ross Smith's channel has over 2 million subscribers, with videos featuring Kana among the most watched.

Kana's viral fame brought her into contact with global stars. The most prominent example is her connection with Lionel Messi. She attended multiple matches featuring Messi, including Argentina's World Cup game against Austria in Dallas in June 2026, where she was filmed cheering him on as he broke the all‑time World Cup goalscoring record. She held up playful signs such as "Messi, will you marry me?" and "I'm 100 years old and I'm a Messi fan", which went viral worldwide.

== Personal life ==
Kana is a colon cancer survivor, having undergone treatment at age 96. She has lived with her grandson in Columbus, Ohio, but remains independent and active, climbing stairs and moving about without assistance. Her longevity and vitality have been widely celebrated, with media outlets highlighting her as proof that age does not limit joy or creativity.

Kana was married to Edward James Kana in 1955 until his death in 1988, and had children, including a daughter, Diana Kana. She is the grandmother of Ross Smith, with whom she became widely known through viral comedy videos.
