= Become (video game) =

2026 comedy action game

- Developer: Valentin Wirth
- Publisher: Valentin Wirth
- Platform: Windows
- Release: Planned 2026
- Genres: Adventure, 3D platformer
- Mode: Single-player

Become is an indie action adventure comedy video game developed and published by Czech designer Valentin Wirth. The game was announced on February 14, 2026 and is planned to be released on Steam in the same year, with console releases planned to be announced in future.

== Gameplay ==
Official trailer of the game

The player controls a single spermatozoon attempting to fertilize an egg, travelling through human reproductive system, facing different dangers alongside millions of other sperms. The player swims through currents, encountering aggressive environments and antibodies, but can upgrade themselves through the collection of sugars and proteins in order to overtake other spermatozoons.

== Reception ==
The game has been largely highlighted as humouristic; Quinton O'Connor from TheGamer in his review mentioned that "there are days when I'm not sure if I even believe what I'm writing, and this is one of them". Robin Valentine of PC Gamer wrote that "the name makes me laugh" and that the game looks "pretty silly and lightweight". Developers stated, that the game also has educational purposes, and contains "humorous references to sperm and conception", without any explicit sexual acts, nudity or violence.
