= Cookie Run =

- Logo used for the KakaoTalk and LINE game
- Genre: Endless running game
- Developer: Devsisters
- Platforms: iOS; Android
- First release: OvenBreak; 15 June 2009
- Latest release: Cookie Run: Crumble; July 30th, 2026

Cookie Run (Korean: 쿠키런; RR: Kukileon, stylized in CamelCase from 2023) is a series of online mobile endless running games developed by Devsisters. Inspired by the classic folk tale The Gingerbread Man, the series is set in a world of conscious gingerbread cookies that were brought to life in an oven by a witch and have since escaped her evil clutches. Each game has a mechanic of the cookies running to earn points and items, overcome obstacles, and fight or escape enemies. The series is available on iOS and Android devices.

== Gameplay ==
Cookie Run is a series of online mobile running games that involve battling to reach the end of a level, with the most recent, non spin-off game being Cookie Run: OvenBreak, which features an ever-expanding collection of cookies, support pets, and valuable treasures, all bearing a different number of points depending on the combination used. Cookie Run at the moment includes six modes, with other modes that will come and go for events. Each game is based on the "freemium" model, which offers the basic game for free while encouraging users to pay in smaller doses for virtual in-game items or abilities.

== List of games ==
Cookie Run series releases
2009	Ovenbreak
2010
2011
2012	Ovenbreak 2
2013	LINE and Kakao
2014
2015
2016	Cookie Run: Ovenbreak
2017
2018	Cookie Run: CookieWars
2019
2020	Cookie Run: Puzzle World
2021	Cookie Run: Kingdom
2022
2023	Cookie Run: The Darkest Night
2024	Cookie Run: Witch's Castle
2024	Cookie Run: Tower of Adventures
2024	Cookie Run India
2025
2026	Cookie Run: OvenSmash
2026	Cookie Run Classic
2026	Cookie Run: Crumble

=== OvenBreak ===
OvenBreak released 12 June 2009. Since its release, it updated to OvenBreak 2 on 11 December 2012, but on 11 December 2013, it was announced that the game would be delisted from the Appstore. A separate title, OvenBreak Infinity, also released in September 2009. In late 2010, OvenBreak Infinity reached #1 on the iOS App Store in the United States in the "Top Free Apps" category.

In Summer 2012, Skittles integrated its brand within OvenBreak as part of a sponsorship program through a new play mode, which featured Skittles in the gameplay and its home screen.

=== Cookie Run (LINE and Kakao) ===
Cookie Run released originally for KakaoTalk on 2 April 2013. It was Devsisters' first game under the Cookie Run IP. It later released for LINE on 29 January 2014 and the game has since seen over 114 million downloads.

On 5 June 2018, the LINE version of Cookie Run shut down and was removed from the Google Play Store and the App Store. On April 2, 2023, Cookie Run celebrated its 10th anniversary, and on April 2, 2024, it resumed updates with a large-scale update for its 11th anniversary after an 8-year hiatus. Alongside the update, Cookie Run was added to the official Devsisters website game list, indicating that Cookie Run will continue its service once again. During the DevNow 2026 live stream, Devsisters announced that a global version of Cookie Run for Kakao called Cookie Run Classic would be released in 2026 with pre registration starting in June.

=== Cookie Run: OvenBreak ===
Cookie Run: OvenBreak released globally (with the exception of China) on October 27, 2016. The game was originally titled Cookie Run 2 when Devsisters revealed their development of a sequel to Cookie Run in April 2015, which was planned to be launched globally by the second half of the year. On September 27, 2016, the game was released for soft-launch, now under the current name, in Canada, Australia, Hong Kong, the Philippines, the Netherlands, and Sweden on both Apple App Store and Google Play.

Ovenbreak is an updated version of the running formula established in previous games: runs features up to two cookies, one Combi Pet, and up to three treasures. Cookies are regularly released in story updates, with updates to the main story coming in annual seasons. The game features multiple singleplayer and PVP modes that involve reaching a high score with the correct combinations.

The game saw occasional collaborations, including Hello Kitty, Catch! Teenieping, The Powerpuff Girls, and My Melody.

=== Cookie Run: Kingdom ===
Cookie Run: Kingdom was released on 19–21 January 2021 worldwide and had its official English release on 8 October 2021., Unlike the previous games, Cookie Run: Kingdom takes place in an alternate universe and is a mix of a collectible RPG and a social kingdom-building game. The story involves joining the forces of Cookies from all over the world to stop the plans of Dark Enchantress Cookie and the Beast Cookies.

Like OvenBreak, Kingdom saw occasional collaborations, such as Sonic the Hedgehog, Disney, Wicked, KPop Demon Hunters and The Amazing Digital Circus.

=== CookieRun: Witch's Castle ===
Cookie Run: Witch's Castle is a block puzzle game released on March 15, 2024.

=== CookieRun: Tower of Adventures ===
CookieRun: Tower of Adventures is a top-down action game released on June 25, 2024.

=== Cookie Wars ===
Cookie Wars was a spin-off game based around the plot of the previous Cookie Run games. It is a mobile tower defense game that was in closed beta, with around 10,000 users testing the game from 10 to 16 April.

On 26 July 2018, the game was soft launched in three countries, Thailand, Hong Kong and Canada. It released globally on 23 August 2018. On 15 April 2020, Devsisters announced that Cookie Wars would shut the game down in the following month.

=== Cookie Run: Puzzle World ===
Cookie Run: Puzzle World (formerly named Cookie Run: JellyPop and Hello! Brave Cookies) is a match-three puzzle game by Devsisters. The game was soft-launched in May 2019 and introduced to international users first to get feedback. It was later officially released in January 2020 worldwide.

Cookie Run: Puzzle World underwent several name changes since its beta release. The current name was adopted on 26 July 2020.

=== Cookie Run: OvenSmash ===
Cookie Run: OvenSmash was announced in 2025 as a 3D fighter and MOBA was coming to mobile devices. It was released on March 26, 2026, and is available on the iOS App Store and Google Play.

=== Cookie Run: The Darkest Night ===
Cookie Run: The Darkest Night is a VR roguelike adventure game for the Meta Quest, with its first chapter releasing on 30 November 2023.

=== Cookie Run: India ===
Cookie Run: India, a reworked version of Cookie Run for Kakao exclusive to India, was released on December 11, 2024, and is published by Krafton.

=== Cookie Run: Crumble ===
Cookie Run: Crumble is an Idle RPG game released on July 30, 2026, by Devsisters.

=== Cookie Run: New World ===
Cookie Run: New World was announced on March 20, 2026, as an open-world adventure game for mobile, consoles and PC. The game is set to be released in 2029.

== Reception ==
The Cookie Run series as a whole has received success domestically and internationally. The original OvenBreak was downloaded over 10 million times and was ranked as the most popular free app on the App Store in 20 countries by 2012. Cookie Run for LINE has ranked #1 in Thailand and #4 in Taiwan for sales in 2014, while seeing over 2.9 million daily users on Kakao in Korea in 2013. Cookie Run: OvenBreak made it in Apple's Best of 2017 for the top 10 most-downloaded free iPhone and iPad games. The game was also in the top 20 free iPhone games in 2017 in South East Asia. Cookie Run: Kingdom was the Grand Prize winner of the 2021 Korea Game Awards with the Best Game of the Year Award and the Character Award of the Year. In Google Play's Best of 2021 for Korea, it was chosen as a winner for Best Game of the Year and User's Choice of 2021. In Korea and Thailand, it won Best Competitive; and in Hong Kong and Taiwan, Best Game Changers. In 2022, Cookie Run: Kingdom won the Pocket Gamer People's Choice award. "Cookie Run: Kingdom" released in the Chinese market in 2023, ranked second on the Chinese Apple App Store popularity rankings about an hour after the official service began.'Cookie Run: Tower of Adventures' won two awards, including '2024 Best Game of the Year' selected by Google Play and the top award in the 'PC Games of the Year' category in 82 countries including Korea and the United States. In 2025, the Cookie Run IP was recognized as a brand with over 200 million global users across 243 countries worldwide, and won the ‘2025 Customer Trust Premium Brand Award’ award in the IP Franchise category.

== Film ==
In October 2026, Brian Robbins's company Big Shot Pictures purchased film rights to the Cookie Run series. The film is planned for a 2029 release date to coincide with the first game's 20th anniversary.
