= Apex Girls =

2024 video game

- Developer(s): Nova Gaming
- Publisher(s): NeoriginGames
- Engine: Unity
- Platform(s): iOS, Android, Windows
- Release: JP: March 28, 2024; KR: January 9, 2025; Global: May 9, 2025
- Genre(s): role-playing, idle
- Mode(s): Single-player, multiplayer

Apex Girls is an idle card role-playing game developed by Nova Gaming and published by NeoriginGames. The game launched on Android and iOS in Japan on March 28, 2024, followed by a DMM platform release on August 28, 2024. It later expanded to South Korea on January 9, 2025, becoming available on Android, iOS, OneStore, and the Samsung Galaxy Store.

Featuring round-based battles, Apex Girls blends character collection, training, and PVP elements, offering strategic gameplay centered around a cast of female characters. As a free-to-play title, it incorporates gacha mechanics and in-app purchases for virtual items.

== Gameplay ==
=== Gacha system ===
The game offers multiple summoning pools, including Ordinary Stellaris, Mimic Stellaris, and Weapons. These pools rotate periodically.

=== Core battle ===
Round-based combat emphasizes strategic team composition, leveraging each characters’ unique traits.

- 5 Factions: Inferno (counters Rancor), Rancor (counters Flare), Flare (counters Void), Void (counters Inferno), Nebula (no faction advantage)
- 4 Classes: Devastator – DPS dealing energy DMG, Assaulter – DPS dealing P.DMG, Defender – Tank, taunts enemies, provides shields, Support – Healer/debuffer, heals allies, applies Buffs/Debuffs

5 units are available per battle, with skip and 2× speed functions.

=== Training system ===
Pets, mechas, and artifacts system are available to play. The idle combat system generates EXP, diamonds, and other resources based on offline time.

== Plot ==
Apex Girls unfolds in a sci-fi world where remnants of the old era’s Relics lie scattered, and Ruin Machines run rampant, reducing once-prosperous cities to ruins. Amid this desolation, a glimmer of hope emerges—a legend of battling alongside countless girls to save the world.

Those who wield Stellar Cores are known as Stellaris, transcending ordinary humans with the power to shatter the cores of Calamity Mech, ensuring civilization’s survival.

Despite the crisis, humanity refuses to surrender. Brave pioneers venture into the perilous wilderness, establishing new sanctuaries and standing united against the catastrophe. As the Sanctuary Commander, player shoulder the immense responsibility of pushing back the encroaching darkness, rebuild their homeland, and secure the future of human civilization.

== Release and reception ==
The game was initially released in Japan on March 28, 2024, with pre-registrations surpassing 200K. As the game approached its six-month anniversary, Neorigin released a DMM game version on August 28, 2024.

Following the game’s showcase at the G-star 2024 gaming convention in Busan, pre-registration for the Korean version commenced on November 14, 2024. The official release was initially scheduled for January 3, 2025, however was postponed to January 9 due to a national mourning period declared following a fatal plane crash incident.

The Korean version of Apex Girls debuted at 6th place on Google play’s popularity rankings, ranked 22nd on the 'Top Grossing Chart' for iPhone apps in the 'Games/Card' category and around 30th in overall game rankings, however it soon saw declining engagement and was on the verge of dropping out of the top 100 rankings by mid-March 2025. According to the data from SensorTower, it got approximately 5K downloads and $90K in revenue during the second month following its official release.
