= G star (disambiguation) =

G star or G-star may refer to:

- Stellar classification#Class G, a type of star.
  - G-type main-sequence star, also called a G V star, a subtype of this type.
- G-Star, an annual South Korean trade show for the computer and video games industry.
- G-Star Raw, a clothing company.
- G-Star School Of The Arts, a public high school in Palm Springs, Florida, USA.
