= Cookie Run: Kingdom =

2021 video game

- Developer: Devsisters
- Publisher: Devsisters
- Producer: Ji-hoon Lee
- Series: Cookie Run
- Platforms: Android; Windows; iOS
- Release: January 19, 2021 (Global): Android, iOS; January 19, 2021; Windows; July 12, 2023; December 28, 2023 (China)
- Genre: Action role-playing
- Modes: Single-player, Multiplayer

Cookie Run: Kingdom (Korean: 쿠키런: 킹덤) is a 2021 role-playing and strategy video game developed and published by Devsisters. It is the seventh game in the Cookie Run series. It was announced on November 28, 2020, and released worldwide on January 19, 2021, on Android and iOS, July 12, 2023 on Google Play Games on PC, and on December 28, 2023 for the Chinese version. (Note: Known as 冲呀！饼干人：王国 in China, with content maintained by Tencent Games.)

Cookie Run: Kingdom is set in a world of anthropomorphized cookies, desserts, and other food items. The cast contains both new and returning characters from throughout the Cookie Run series. As of 2026, the story is ongoing, with the plot being spread across chapters which are being released in successive updates.

== Gameplay ==
Cookie Run: Kingdom is a free-to-play role-playing and city-building battle simulator. The game is mainly played by building the player's Cookie Kingdom and collecting Cookies through the game's gacha to unlock new Cookies to use in various game modes.

In the kingdom, players place production buildings to produce goods and materials, which are mainly used for upgrading buildings and game aspects or can be traded through various facilities for rewards. Players are free to decorate their kingdoms with a catalog of decorative items, which can be acquired with the game's currency or with real money. New facilities and land expansion are unlocked by upgrading the Cookie Castle.

The game modes include PvP and Guild systems, various PvE challenges, seasonal and event game modes that add strategy and variety to the team-building mechanics, and Special Episodes that feature side stories, with some that tie into major side characters. The main story mode, World Exploration, includes three stories, Crispia, Beast-Yeast and Timeline of Fate, each giving different rewards, for timeline of fates most of the rewards are based on the chapters, but consists of magic cube and more

As of March 2026, Cookie Run: Kingdom has over 185 playable Cookies that can be obtained in the gacha. Each Cookie has a rarity, which indicates both drop rates from the gacha and power level: Common, Rare, Epic, Super Epic, Legendary, Beast, Ancient, and Witch. These cookies can then be placed in the kingdom. In addition, non-playable Guest Cookies and MyCookie cannot be used in PvP or PvE combat.

The Chinese version has several exclusive Cookies, though three such characters -Golden Osmanthus Cookie, Red Osmanthus Cookie and Camellia Cookie- have since been included in the global version.

Cookie Run: Kingdom also includes many microtransactions and event cosmetics which can be locked behind paywalls. Devsisters also often reward players with in-game currency for delays, maintenance or any issues from Devsisters.

== Plot ==
=== Act 1: Crispia and Beast-Yeast ===
Illustration of the five Ancient Cookies (from left to right): White Lily Cookie, Dark Cacao Cookie, Pure Vanilla Cookie, Hollyberry Cookie, and Golden Cheese Cookie

The initial plot of Cookie Run Kingdom centers around five Ancient Cookies. Each of the Ancient Cookies rules a kingdom and possesses a "Soul Jam", a magical artifact that grants power and is associated with a virtue. It is later revealed that one of the ancient heroes, White Lily Cookie, is rebaked as Dark Enchantress Cookie, the game's main antagonist, after finding out that cookies were created to be eaten. The story begins with a flashback that shows the heroes fighting Dark Enchantress Cookie. However while they defeated Dark Enchantress Cookie, in the process they lost their soul jams leading them to go into hiding or confinement, leaving their kingdoms in disarray.

A long time after this altercation the main protagonist of the story, GingerBrave, alongside a few friends find themselves in the ruins of a former kingdom. Over the course of the game, they rebuild the kingdom and journey across the various regions of Crispia, the game's first major continent. As they travel they learn about the history of the lost kingdoms and Dark Enchantress Cookie's plans. They soon begin a search for the Ancient Cookies, along with various other powerful Cookie figures, to enlist their help in defeating Dark Enchantress Cookie.

Later the group learns they need to travel to "Beast-Yeast", the game's second major continent, to find the White Lily Cookie. It is revealed that the ancient heroes were not the original holders of the Soul Jams. They were previously held by five cookies who were corrupted and came to embody vices referred to as "Beast" cookies. These cookies were then sealed away with the help of Silent Salt Cookie, one of the Beast cookies, in an act of betrayal. Across the game's updates each Hero fights their corresponding Beast gaining a new "Awakened" form. The group eventually locates Dark Enchantress Cookie's lair and lab where she plans to create an "Ultimate Cookie" vessel to wipe out all life.

In the final battle of act one Dark Enchantress Cookie absorbs the power of the Ancient and Beast Cookies' Soul Jams to turn herself into a giant humanoid form. During the battle she reveals Silent Salt Cookie's betrayal to the Beast Cookies, prompting them to turn against him after learning that he had sealed them away. Silent Salt Cookie responds by binding the Beast Cookies, preventing them from aiding Dark Enchantress Cookie. As the battle continues, the Beast Cookies become increasingly weakened, leaving them unable to continue fighting. One of the Beast cookies, Shadow Milk Cookie, ultimately manages to fully break free from Silent Salt Cookie's spell and absorbs the residual power of three Beast Cookies (except Silent Salt Cookie, who later sacrifices himself by destroying his own Soul Jam in an attempt to keep Shadow Milk Cookie from gaining his power) along with a fragment of the Ultimate Cookie, declaring his intention to erase the timeline and remake it in his own image. The remaining Beast Cookies ultimately succumb and perish and White Lily Cookie chooses to sacrifice her physical form to neutralize the darkness, sending her own life to the Tartrus of Oblivion, where Nether Queen Cookie waited for her after the incident at the Blueberry Yogurt Academy, while trying to resurrect the First Headmaster (which is later revealed to be Shadow Milk Cookie, in the second act).

In the final moments of the act, a small sprout of light emerges from the remains of the Soul Jams of White Lily Cookie and Silent Salt Cookie to reveal a new Cookie, while Shadow Milk Cookie, now evolved into a multiversal threat, escapes into the dimensional rifts, drawing the attention of Timekeeper Cookie, the director of the Time Balance Department (TBD), and the inactive Ultimate Cookie catches the attention of another Witch.

=== Act 2: Timeline of Fate ===
Shadow Milk Cookie, now elevated thanks to the power of the Soul Jams from the former Beast Cookies, splits the timeline in two, creating an alternate, diverging timeline of his design. In this diverged timeline, Shadow Milk Cookie imprisons the guardian of the tree that they had been sealed in, Elder Faerie Cookie, in their place and uses his and the Ultimate Cookie's power to corrupt the Beasts even further giving them bug-like alternate forms, including an alternate version of himself. In the present, Gingerbrave and co. fend off an attack from Ash Salt Cookie, a cookie from Shadow Milk Cookie's alternate timeline, which was made in an attempt to kill the sprout of light that emerged from the remains of White Lily Cookie and Silent Salt Cookie's Soul Jams. They meet with Timekeeper Cookie and she explains the dire situations regarding the timeline to the main protagonists.

Following on from this, several plotlines occurring at the same time unfold, including GingerBrave and friends' attempts to find a way to make a new body for the new solidarity Cookie, efforts by SCOOP (another division of the TBD, based on the SCP Foundation) to reawaken the Beast Cookies of the main timeline to stabilize it (coming into conflict with the alternate timeline Beasts to do so) and Hollyberry Cookie's efforts to find the Dragon Cookies while fending off attacks from corrupted versions of the original Guardians of Nature from the diverged timeline.

== Development and release ==
Cookie Run: Kingdom was developed and published by Devsisters. It was released on 21 January 2021 for iOS and Android. The development started in late 2016 and took nearly four years.

When creating Cookie Run: Kingdom, the development team aimed to combine two types of games: social-network games (SNGs) and role-playing games (RPGs). This combination meant that, for the developers, there would be an increase in workload and cost. Cookie Run: Kingdom was launched on January 19, 2021.

The game has had several collaborations that feature limited characters. In September 2021, Sonic Cookie and Tails Cookie were added as part of Sega's Sonic the Hedgehog's 30th anniversary. 2022 saw two collaborations with dedicated updates: Festival of Dreams and Wishes introduced Disney Cookies as Guests and ran between July and September 2022, and Braver Together, which added the members of BTS as playable Cookies, ran between October and January 2023. In November 2025, a collaboration with Universal's Wicked franchise added Glinda and Elphaba, as depicted in the Wicked films, as playable Cookies, along with an event story based on the events of the films up to the opening of Wicked: For Good. April 2026 also featured a collaboration with Netflix with a dedicated update based on the film KPop Demon Hunters, which added the members of Huntrix (Rumi, Mira and Zoey) as playable Cookies and the members of the Saja Boys, as well as Derpy & Sussie, as Guests. It also included costumes based on "Golden" and "Your Idol", along with a time-limited Special Episode based on the film's events. In the middle of the K-Pop Demon Hunters update, a new Korean girl group called B!TES was formed, consisting of 5 members: Caramel Choux Cookie, Caramel Arrow Cookie, Okchun Cookie, Mozzarella Cookie, and Sugarfly Cookie. In late October 2026, Devsisters collaborated with Glitch Productions' The Amazing Digital Circus, which added two playable Special Cookies, Jax Cookie and Pomni Cookie, along with Gangle, Zooble, Ragatha, Kinger and Caine as Guest Cookies. It also introduced a new event story and boss raid based on The Amazing Digital Circus.

The Chinese version also received a few collaborations in 2024, starting with Guest Cookies based on popular Want Want snacks were in January 2024, and then with characters from Empresses in the Palace as guests in July 2024, with Zhen Huan being a playable Cookie. Furthermore, the Chinese version also has a number of mainland China-exclusive features and content that are not present in the global version and therefore are only exclusive to that version.

== Reception ==
The game had gained massive popularity in the wake of Genshin Impact's anniversary rewards controversy and its similar free-to-play gacha model.

Cookie Run: Kingdom is ranked 31st in the Free Role-Playing Game category in Thailand. In terms of free games, the game ranked 1st on Apple's App Store and Google Play in Japan and 3rd in the Free Role-Playing game category in the United States. It was also ranked 1st in South Korea, 2nd in Taiwan, 3rd in Thailand, and 5th in Hong Kong in the App Store's Free Game category in January 2021. In South Korea, Taiwan, and Thailand, the game's revenue was ranked 1st on the App Store, and in Hong Kong and Singapore, it was ranked 3rd in January 2021. Cookie Run: Kingdom had 10 million downloads in the first two months after its release and has been downloaded over 150 million times as of June 2021. Since its official launch in China in December 2023, it recorded over $10 million in revenue in the Chinese iOS market alone over approximately 35 days. Five days after the 4th anniversary service update on January 15, 2025, revenue increased by 37.5% compared to the previous year, and the number of paying users increased by 16.3%. As of 2025, the game is one of the Top 10 U.S. Trending Topics on YouTube.
