= Phantom Crash =

2002 video game

- Developer: Genki
- Publishers: JP: Genki; NA: Encore Games; NA/EU: Phantagram
- Director: Ichiro Kojima
- Producer: Kenji Ōta
- Platform: Xbox
- Release: JP: 20 June 2002; NA: 6 November 2002; EU: 22 November 2002
- Genre: Vehicular combat
- Modes: Single-player, multiplayer

Phantom Crash is a 2002 video game developed by the Japanese game studio Genki and published by Phantagram exclusively for the Xbox. The game is a vehicular combat game in which players enter competitive combat using mecha named Scoot Vehicles, using the winnings of events to customise and upgrade the capabilities of their vehicles. Upon release, Phantom Crash received average reviews, with praise directed to the game's level of detail in its vehicles and customisation features, whilst critiquing the large levels of dialogue and lack of stages and multiplayer options. In 2005, Genki released a sequel exclusively for the PlayStation 2, titled S.L.A.I.: Steel Lancer Arena International.

== Plot ==
Set in the year 2031, Phantom Crash takes place in Old Tokyo, a deserted ruin used for Rumbling, a new form of televised combat sport involving mecha known as Scoot Vehicles, or SVs. Players assume the role of a recent, nameless arrival intent on climbing the ranks of Rumbling and confront and defeat its First Ranker, and meets many characters involved in the sport along the way.

== Gameplay ==
A screenshot of gameplay in Phantom Crash.

Phantom Crash is a mecha vehicular combat game with two main modes, a single-player 'Quest Mode' and multiplayer 'Versus Mode'. In the 'Quest Mode', players progress through a story whilst engaging in a leaderboard of competitive events, called 'rumbling', to rise in rank across four difficulty classes three different arenas. In these events, players compete in arena deathmatches to defeat as many competitors as possible with the weapons on their SV, and earn money for each competitor defeated, with damage to the player's SV incurring costs for repairs. Once the player has defeated enough competitors in an arena, they are able to face a 'class captain' for a larger reward. The Quest Mode features a day-to-day system in which players compete in one event per day, with matches, shop contents and story events navigated using a map interface.

Using winnings from events, players in Phantom Crash are able to purchase new SVs or repair and upgrade them with a large variety of customisation options. Individual components of SVs are interchangeable, such as melee and ranged weapons on arms and shoulders, and upgrades to the legs and body of the SV. Events have weight limitations, requiring players to balance options between weapons and defences, or upgrade carrying capacity with leg modules. are SVs also can feature optic camouflage, making their SVs invisibile for a limited time, and a rocket-assisted jump. SVs can be further customised with paint jobs and a CHIP, an artificial intelligence interface that affects the range of lock on and attack capabilities.

== Development and release ==
Phantom Crash was developed by a team of 20 developers in Genki over the course of two years. Sales and distribution of Phantom Crash in North America was undertaken by Encore following a distribution deal with Phantagram in September 2002. Plans existed for Phantagram to publish a computer port of Phantom Crash in 2003 with planned network support for 32 players, however, this port remained unreleased. Genki handled publishing duties in Japan, releasing the title on 20 June. In North America, the game was released on 6 November 2002. In the United Kingdom, Phantagram alone published the title, releasing it on 22 November.

== Reception ==
Reception

Aggregate score
Aggregator	Score
Metacritic	74/100

Review scores
Publication	Score
Electronic Gaming Monthly	8.0/7.5/8.5
Eurogamer	7/10
GamePro	4.0/5
GameSpot	7.5/10
Hyper	80%
IGN	7.5/10
Xbox Magazine (XBM)	8/10
Xbox Nation (XBN)	8/10

Phantom Crash received "mixed or average" reviews from review aggregator Metacritic, with an average score of 72%. Reviewers praised the extent of detail and customisation available in the game. Describing the game as "wonderfully deep", Hyper praised the "astounding selection" of upgrades "in consideration of the fact that it's possible to configure the performance of individual components". IGN highlighted the "interesting twists" to the game's upgrades and customisation system, with a "nice range of accessible and hardcore". Xbox Magazine highlighted the "strangely addictive" appeal of customising SVs and fine-tuning their performance between battles, although noting "the depth of the customisation...can be a little confusing and occasionally awkward". GameSpot wrote "the level of customization in Phantom Crash is just amazing, and it lends the game a real role-playing feel".

Critics were also impressed with the visual presentation of the game. IGN praised the SVs as "extremely detailed and animated beautifully". Hyper described the game's graphics as "quite impressive", writing that "animations are fluid, explosions are meaty, and the tremendous variation in the sizes, styles and colours of the SVs certainly keeps things interesting". Electronic Gaming Monthly described the game as the "best-looking" mech shooter on consoles. Describing the presentation as "a look that oscillates between retro and cutting edge", GameSpot praised the game's "great amount of detail" and "quasi-mechanical touches" on its SVs, but faulted the game's "low-res and blocky" character images and "minor slowdown".

Reviewers of Phantom Crash were mixed on the game's localisation and narrative. Eurogamer cited the game's "unnecessary storyline", faulting the game's "unskippable cutscenes" and dialog "in a form of broken Japlish", finding "little escape from the story" throughout the gameplay. GameSpot described the story as "inconsequential", but noted "the fun banter between the characters does a good job of setting the mood". Electronic Gaming Monthly critiqued the game's writing, citing its "bizarre storyline" and "nonsensical dialogue". Xbox Nation similarly faulted the "nonsensical dialogue to wade through". GamePro described the storyline as "genuinely weird".

Critics expressed disappointment in the multiplayer mode of the game. Eurogamer cited the lack of Xbox Live support as a "fundamental flaw" of the game. GameZone described the multiplayer elements as "hardly worth mentioning", citing the desire for matches with team play or variable conditions and the lack of arenas. Xbox Magazine critiqued the lack of "different game modes" and "variety on the battlefield", observing the absence of team games such as a capture the flag, domination or tag game. Electronic Gaming Monthly noted the multiplayer had "limited customisation", writing that the mode "ain't all it could have been". Xbox Nation similarly noted the "glaring shortcoming" of the "lack of variety" in the multiplayer mode. GameSpot also stated that "the game could have benefited from a greater number of arenas, more diverse variety of SVs, and more gameplay modes".
