= S.L.A.I.: Steel Lancer Arena International =

2005 video game

- Developer: Genki
- Publisher: Konami
- Platform: PlayStation 2
- Release: NA: 20 September 2005; JP: 22 September 2005; EU: 11 November 2005; AU: 18 November 2005
- Genre: Vehicular combat
- Modes: Single-player, multiplayer

S.L.A.I.: Steel Lancer Arena International is a vehicular combat video game developed by Genki and published by Konami exclusively for PlayStation 2. It is the sequel to Phantom Crash.

== Plot ==
The game's main story line takes place in 2071, in a future where the sport of "rumbling" has taken precedence. Players called "wire-heads" compete by piloting SVs, a variation of the mech, in specially built arenas in seven real world cities such as New York City, Tokyo, and London. Each city has eight standard "rankers", ranging from categories D-A which describe the overall difficulty and whether they compete during the day or night. Upon beating all 56 of these Rankers, players can then battle against each city's Regional Ranker. After beating these seven, they are allowed to compete for the Third, Second, and First Ranker, officially making them one of the best players in the world. During this quest, players will become part of an investigation trying to find a serial killer who starts killing other wire-heads, with the plot moving as rankers are defeated.

== Companies ==
Like in Phantom Crash, there are several (fictional) Companies in SLAI.

- Kojima – Founded 1969 as a machines plant in old Tokyo. Began constructing SVs in the early 2020s. Their SV is the Ultralight "Proton", the successor of the "Photon" from Phantom Crash. The company name is also a reference to the main producer of the game, Ichiro Kojima.
- OMSK – A former Soviet bureau formed in the 1980s (1950 in the Japanese Site). OMSK entered the civilian market in 2027. Manufacturers the lightweight, long-range SV "кит" (Russian for whale).
- Ventuno - The Italian automobile company, founded in 2001, produces the Carro (Italian for wagon). The mid-ranged Carro has the most balanced specs out of all of the SVs.
- S&V Ma. Fabrik – A German robot company founded in 2016. S&V's Scoobie, the shortrange/melee-type Zwerg (German for Dwarf) has unique melee weapons like the EMP-Fist.
- American Stars - The American conglomerate that has been making some of the world's leading SVs from 2012 to 2071. It is the supplier of the heavy Hartman SV.

== Characters ==
Player – represents the player in the Story mode of gameplay. Players can determine their gender when they first start by choosing among the free Lo-Tek models, some male and female. Later in the game, players can purchase different "personas" from the IDOL shop.

Knocker – A very minor character; he is the player's virtual daemon guide when they first join HAVEN. He stays with the player until they switch his Chip for a different one. If the player's chip shuts down, Knocker comes back until they get a new chip.

DD & JJ – When the player first enters Hard-Wired, where they go to enter rumbles, they run into this curious duo. As a freelance internet blogger, DD has been having trouble getting hits on her site, and is in debt up to her knees from the purchase of her new "Edge" series persona. JJ is a dog IC (Intelligent Chip) that serves as the main editor of DD's blog site. The player agrees to have DD and JJ report on their progress.

Embryo – A rumbler on the God Mode team. When the player takes the FIRA exam in the beginning, Embryo is one of the Wire-Heads they rumble against. He changes his persona throughout the story and gets stronger alongside the player. He has a sheep chip named Anima.

Lynx – The third place world ranker. Later in the game he becomes the second world ranker. He has a bird chip named Helix. He is the leader of the God Mode team, which is made up of himself, Skeln, Sin, Embryo, and Flint.

Bogeyman – The first place world ranker. He has a fox chip named JOL.

Hot Rod – The second place world ranker. He has a monkey chip named Cool Cod. He dies in real life early in the story.

Lucas – The third place world ranker after Lynx takes over the second place. Has a unicorn chip named Chani.

== Gameplay ==
Gameplay consists of free-for-all style combat, pitting the player against computer controlled SVs. The object of the battle is to defeat every "rumbler" that appears in the arena, though this goal is made difficult by the fact that defeated SVs will return while the player is still rumbling. Once every SV has been defeated, the Ranker of that arena and particular "Class Level" will arrive, made apparent by a unique statement appearing in the dialogue box at the top of the screen. Once the Ranker has been defeated, the player may either leave through an entrance gate, or continue play against previously defeated Wire-Heads. Each arena has several destructible targets which can be destroyed for money known as "Crypto Credits". During the course of a rumble, support crates, known as "Cubes", will be dropped into the arena at designated zones. Among the Cubes, there are three varieties: Green "Ammo" Cubes that replenish ammunition levels, blue "Crypto" Cubes that add to the player's winnings, and last being red and white "Armor" Cubes which restores the SV's armor levels and repairs damaged weapons.

SVs come in five varieties. Protons, KHTs, Carros, Zwergs, and Hartmans. Three additional SVs, Molniyas, Arditos, and Elints, can be purchased from Wild Machines after completing the story. Each SV can hold up to four weapons, consisting of two arm weapons and two shoulder-mounted weapons. These include machine guns, swords, missiles, lasers, chainsaws and many other unique armaments. A particular sword module called a "Plasma Pulverizer" can disable an enemy's Optical Camouflage for a limited amount of time when they're hit with it. SVs may also be equipped with several option modules. O.C. or, "Optical Camouflage" will allow an SV to temporarily become invisible. The player can purchase better models that have a longer run time and faster regeneration time. SV's can also be decorated with paint and decals. Also, the player can buy certain items that look like an envelope called "stocks". They have a different name on each one representing a different company. The value of these items fluctuates over time so the player must sell and buy them at the right time.

Of particular note are the chips that accompany the player throughout gameplay. In the game's story, chips are responsible for actually operating SVs while players remotely control the action from special computer terminals. Represented by animals, they each have distinct personalities and can gradually learn skills that enhance the performance of SVs in a style similar to role playing games. Like SVs, they are capable of being destroyed upon receiving too much damage in a rumble, and therefore must be regularly maintained.

Certain rumblers called "Crashers" that can enter or exit a match at any time and are often represented by a blue health bar. They are usually very dangerous, have lots of health, and can deal extreme amounts of damage in little time. Crashers are, in reality, Rankers from both different locations and of different, sometimes higher, ranks.

Outside of battle players may perform a variety of tasks via a stylized menu interface that represents the city's computer server. Included are a variety of shops for rumbling-related services, including stores to buy SVs and parts, a "beam-port" that allows players to travel between cities, and an official Rumbling area where players enter battle.

=== Online ===
Online play was originally available, including a leaderboard similar to the rankings in the story mode and the ability to create clans. However, the server was officially shut down on October 1, 2006, thereby discontinuing online play.

=== Servers ===
Servers are the cities where the player can rumble. Each server has its own color, a different lay-out, and contains stores and shops. There are no unique stores for different servers, instead stores are constant. Each server also has its own unique music from Blood Music. There are 7 FIRA Servers in total; The Liberties Server, The Strip Server, The Miyako Server, The Dragon Server, The Memphis Server, The Valhalla Server, and the Hide-Park Server. The respective cities are New York, Las Vegas, Tokyo, Hong Kong, Cairo, Stuttgart, and London.

== Stores ==
In the world that the player plays in, known as HAVEN, there are several different locations ("stores") that they can visit. The player can change between stores as often as they want. However, 3 of these stores give the player an option for skipping ahead to the next day (marked with a †).

=== Hard-Wired ===
This is the "building" that the player will most often use, as it is the gateway to the rumbling arenas. This store also provides the player with the FIRA Rumbling Schedule, which shows what types of rumbles are taking place in the 7 servers for each of the 100 days on the calendar. It also allows the player to "scout" the rumblers that are currently on the field at the time you enter the store, showing them their name, IC, and bounty if they knock them out. There is also a sleep chamber so that if the player does not wish to rumble that day, they can skip to the next.

=== SV Hangar ===
The name of this store is rather self-explanatory; it is a storage area for the SV's that the player owns. The player starts out with having only 3 slots available for them, but they can purchase up to 5 more slots to use, each one at the cost of 100,000 credits. The SV Hangar also allows the player to customize and build your SV and assign it (when an SV is "assigned", the SV will stay with them as they explore HAVEN, and will be the SV that they use when they rumble). The player can also build a rumbling playlist made of songs that they purchase from Blood Music. The player can also change IC's.

=== Mechanist ===
The Mechanist is a store that sells the individual "modules" of SVs, having sections for each part type, including: Body, Legs, Arm Weapons, and Shoulder mounted weapons. The Mechanist also features paint-kits, decals, and miscellaneous optional equipment ranging from O.C. devices, tradeable stocks, insurance, I.C. improving equipment, armor additives, and priceless minerals, among others.

=== Blood Music ===
Blood Music is the store where the player can buy music and listen to their bought music when they are rumbling. It has many bands and singers including: Zebrahead, Chris Thompson, Welbilt, and many others with varying degrees of fame.

=== Difference EG. ===
Difference EG. is a store where the player can buy, sell, or heal their chip. Each chip is represented by an animal and has different stats. The stats depend on the animal type of that particular IC. For example: any bird chips will have significantly better long range attack stats than the dog chip, which can level up faster than the bird chip.

=== Edgeworks ===
Edgeworks is a shop in each server that allows the player to modify their SV's parts, with the exception of Optional parts (Coprocessors, Cloak Generators, etc.) When the player buys an SV from any of the Company's stores, all parts are at their default setting. Using Edgeworks, the player can modify each part in two general directions; Heavy upgrades their part's durability, armor points, damage, and increases the part's weight, whereas leaning a part towards the Light branch will cause a part to do less damage and have less durability, but give it more ammo and a lighter weight. (When using modifications with their legs, Heavy and Light will also change the limit of their Maximum Load stat, and if they focus the modifications on their body, it is possible to upgrade or decrease the maximum number of Optional slots available)

=== IDOL ===
The Idol store allows the player to purchase a persona that they will use to represent their character in HAVEN. There are 4 different lines of personas, ranging from the cheap "Lo-Tek" models to the top-quality "Edge" series. There is also the "Readout" series and the "Puppet" series. The Edge series is the most expensive, than the Readout series, the Puppet series and the least expensive but low quality series, the Lo-tek series.

=== Beam Port ===
The Beam Port allows the player to move to different servers. This becomes necessary when the player has either beaten all of the rankers on the server they started on, or once they cannot defeat any of the high rankers, so they must fight more D and C rankers.

=== Wild Machines ===
First to unlock Wild Machines the player must defeat at least 25 rankers. The Wild Machines store sells new rare weapons like a CO_{2}-powered laser weapon for the Proton SV and the XPC Thunderbird, a powerful laser weapon for the Hartman SV. They sell regular products like body mods and legs but at heavily upgraded levels like 5, 10, 15, and some times even 20. SVs carrying rare weapons are also sold here. Sometimes they will sell special SVs like ELINT, MOLNIYA, and ARDITO but the player must beat the 1st ranker and win the game to make them available.

== Reception ==
Reception

Aggregate score
Aggregator	Score
Metacritic	66/100

Review scores
Publication	Score
GameSpot	7/10
VideoGamer.com	7/10

S.L.A.I.: Steel Lancer Arena International received "mixed or average" reviews, according to review aggregator Metacritic.
