= Korea Game Awards =

South Korean game awards ceremony

- Text logo
- Location: Busan
- Country: South Korea
- Presented by: Ministry of Culture, Sports and Tourism; The Electronic Times; The Sports Chosun
- First award: December 2, 1996; 29 years ago

The Korea Game Awards (Korean: 대한민국 게임대상; RR: Daehan Minguk geim daesang) is an annual South Korean awards ceremony that recognizes "individuals and businesses that have contributed to domestic game industry." The ceremony is organized by the Korea Association of Game Industry (K-GAMES) and presented by the Ministry of Culture, Sports and Tourism, The Electronic Times and The Sports Chosun in conjunction with the G-Star game trade fair held in Busan in November. It is the largest and most prestigious awards ceremony for games in the country, and has been held yearly since 1996.

Winners are decided by a combination of judges, game experts and online votes. The Grand Prize, given to the overall best game of the year (also called the President's Award) has historically been won almost exclusively by PC games; 2004's Kingdom Under Fire: The Crusaders is the only console game to win the award. However, in 2014, Blade for Kakao became the first mobile game to win, and since then several mobile games have won the award.

== Winners of the Grand Prize (President's Award) ==
Year	Game	Genre	Developer	Ref.
1996	Pee & Gity 2: The Industrial Age	Beat 'em up	Family Production	
1997	Wangdo-ui Bimil	Action-adventure	Digital Dream Studios	
1998	Lineage	MMORPG	NCSoft	
1999	EZ2DJ	Rhythm	AmuseWorld	
2000	Fortress 2	Artillery	CCR Inc	
2001	The War of Genesis III: Part 2	Tactical role-playing	Softmax	
2002	Navy Field	MMORTS	SDEnterNet	
2003	Lineage II	MMORPG	NCSoft	
2004	Kingdom Under Fire: The Crusaders	Hack and slash, real-time tactics	Phantagram	
2005	Scions of Fate (Yulgang)	MMORPG	Mgame Corp	
2006	Granado Espada	MMORPG	IMC Games	
2007	Alliance of Valiant Arms (A.V.A)	First-person shooter	Red Duck	
2008	Aion: The Tower of Eternity	MMORPG	NCSoft	
2009	Continent of the Ninth Seal (C9)	MMORPG	Webzen	
2010	Vindictus (Mabinogi Heroes)	MMORPG	Nexon	
2011	TERA	MMORPG	Bluehole Studio	
2012	Blade & Soul	MMORPG	NCSoft	
2013	ArcheAge	MMORPG	XL Games	
2014	Blade for Kakao	Action RPG	Action Square	
2015	EvilBane: Rise of Ravens (Raven)	Action RPG	Netmarble	
2016	Heroes of Incredible Tales (HIT)	Action RPG	NAT Games	
2017	PlayerUnknown's Battlegrounds	Battle royale	PUBG Corporation	
2018	Black Desert Mobile	MMORPG	Pearl Abyss	
2019	Lost Ark	MMORPG	Smilegate RPG	
2020	V4 (Victory For)	MMORPG	NAT Games	
2021	Odin: Valhalla Rising	MMORPG	Lionheart Studio	
2022	Dungeon & Fighter Mobile	Beat 'em up	Nexon	
2023	Lies of P	Action RPG	Neowiz Games	
2024	Solo Leveling: ARISE	Action	Netmarble	
2025	Mabinogi Mobile	MMORPG	Nexon	
