= Cookie Run (video game) =

2013 video game

- Developer: Devsisters
- Publishers: Devsisters; Krafton (India)
- Series: Cookie Run
- Platforms: iOS, Android
- Release: Kakao: 2 April 2013; LINE: 29 January 2014; India: December 11, 2024; Classic: June 25, 2026

Cookie Run (Hangul: 쿠키런; RR Kukileon) (also known as Cookie Run: Classic) is an online mobile endless running game in the Cookie Run series created by Devsisters. The game is inspired by The Gingerbread Man, a famous fairy tale. The game was released on 2 April 2013 for Kakao, and 29 January 2014 for LINE. Cookie Run India, an India-exclusive version of the game, was released on December 11, 2024, and is published by Krafton.

There is a difference between LINE, India and Kakao versions of the game. The Kakao version is available only in South Korea with only Korean language supported, while the LINE version is available globally with 4 languages available: English, Thai, Japanese and Traditional Chinese. On 5 June 2018, the LINE version of Cookie Run discontinued and shut down. It was also removed from the Google Play Store and the App Store. On April 2, 2023, Cookie Run celebrated its 10th anniversary, and on April 2, 2024, the Kakao version resumed updates with a large-scale update for its 11th anniversary after an 8-year hiatus. Alongside the update, Cookie Run was added to the official Devsisters website game list, indicating that Cookie Run will continue its service once again. Cookie Run India, based on the Kakao version, is available only in India with only English language support.

In Cookie Run, players have to help a cookie run as far from the starting point as they can, avoiding obstacles, jumping through holes, and collecting coins and "Jellies".

== Gameplay ==
Cookie Run is an endless running game and so the player runs automatically. There are two control buttons on the screen: Jump and Slide. Cookies can perform a Double Jump if the Jump button is tapped twice. The goal is to earn as many points as possible in the form of coins and jellies until the cookie fails to obstacles, enemies, or time. The player can earn a "Bonus Time" to earn a lot more points by collecting the alphabet of those letters. The characters used are cookies, which can be upgraded and given power-ups to do better. The player can only play with the cookie for a certain amount of time before losing all their hearts. Once the cookie runs out of hearts, the player must wait for their hearts to regenerate, invite others to play the game, or pay for hearts.

== Reception ==
Cookie Run has received high player counts in the countries of South Korea, Thailand and Taiwan. It received over 10 million downloads in just a month in its LINE release and was the top-grossing game in South Korea on Kakao for 11 months.
