= Black Desert Online =

2014 video game

- Developer: Pearl Abyss
- Publisher: Pearl Abyss
- Directors: Kim Dae-il, Yoon Jae-min
- Producer: Berkay Bayar Kim Jae-hee
- Designer: Murtoli Durdoli
- Artist: Seo Yong-su
- Composer: Ryu Hui-min
- Platforms: Microsoft Windows, Linux; Black Desert Console; PlayStation 4, PlayStation 5, Xbox One, Xbox Series X/S; Black Desert Mobile; Android, iOS, iPadOS
- Release: Microsoft Windows: KOR: 14 July 2015; EU/NA: 3 March 2016; Android, iOS (Mobile): AS: 2019; WW: December 2019; Black Desert Console; Xbox One: WW: 4 March 2019; PlayStation 4: WW: 22 August 2019; PlayStation 5, Xbox Series X/S: WW: 26 June 2025
- Genre: MMORPG
- Mode: Multiplayer

Black Desert Online (Korean: 검은사막; RR: Geomeun samak) is a 2015 sandbox-oriented fantasy massively multiplayer online role-playing game (MMORPG) developed by Korean video game developer Pearl Abyss and originally published for Microsoft Windows in 2015. A mobile version titled Black Desert Mobile was initially released in Asia by early 2019, and worldwide in December 2019. The Xbox One and PlayStation 4 versions, known simply as Black Desert and referred to as Black Desert Console, were released in 2019. The game is free-to-play in some parts of the world, but follows a buy-to-play business model in other editions, including the English-language editions.

In 2018, Pearl Abyss began work on a prequel to the timeline of Black Desert, titled Crimson Desert, but during development it became a separate, stand alone IP with a different storyline and new characters.

In 2021, Kakao Games stopped services and Pearl Abyss took back the publishing rights.

== Gameplay ==
The combat in Black Desert Online is action based, requiring manual aiming and free movement similar to those found in third-person shooters. The game offers housing, fishing, farming, and trading, as well as large player versus player siege events, and castle battles. It is well regarded for its advanced and in-depth character customization.

An active combat system requires precise manual aiming, dodging and using combos, unlike the tab-targeting system seen in most MMORPGs. Skills can be activated through use of combos for attacking, dodging or blocking. Players are also able to engage in mounted combat. Mounts are acquired by taming in the wild, and players are able to breed special mounts by mating certain types. Mounts require feeding and care, cannot be stored in the inventory, and may be killed.

The game includes a number of features to assist with immersion and the sandbox aspect. The dynamic, worldwide weather system includes large-scale events such as typhoons and will influence gameplay. Localized weather will include events such as temporary fog, which players may exploit to launch surprise attacks on rival guild structures. There is also a dynamic day/night cycle with a gradual progression of lighting effects. During the night some non-player characters (NPCs) will become unavailable as they return home and the monsters will drop more loot. Different game content is available depending upon whether it is night or day. Player housing is instanced and varies in size and location. Players are able to furnish and equip their housing by purchasing furniture through NPCs or through crafting.

== Setting ==
Black Desert Online takes place in a high fantasy setting and revolves around the conflict between two rival nations, the Republic of Calpheon and the Kingdom of Valencia. Calpheon is very materialistic whereas Valencia is very spiritual.

Long ago, the four main areas, Calpheon, Serendia, Balenos, and Mediah, were at peace. This all changed when the Black Death started spreading via merchants from Valencia, in an area east of Mediah that controlled trading. Many around the world died of the plague. Some who did not, were expelled due to the black death causing paranoia. Eventually, the three of the main areas made an alliance and began a war that lasted for 30 years; with Mediah profiting the most by harvesting black stones and trading it to the others.

After the war, the alliance slowly started to conduct trades with Valencia once again. Tensions arose when the other areas discovered the importance of black stones. Desperate to gain wealth, they began to search for black stones as well. Calpheon had no area that harbored the precious black stones, thus they stole from the rest. This created further conflicts with Valencia, due to the fact that Valencia has a vast Black Desert which holds many black stones.

== Classes ==
Black Desert Online currently has 32 classes available of which are the Warrior, Ranger, Sorceress, Berserker, Tamer, Musa, Maehwa, Valkyrie, Kunoichi, Ninja, Wizard, Witch, Striker, Mystic, Lahn, Archer, Dark Knight, Shai, Guardian, Hashashin, Nova, Sage, Corsair, Drakania, Woosa, Maegu, Scholar, Dosa, Deadeye, Wukong, Seraph and Agent.

== Development and release history ==
=== Early PC development and release ===
Black Desert Online has been in development since 2010. The Korean studio Pearl Abyss was founded in September 2010 by Kim Daeil, previously a developer with Hangame and NHN Gaming, and began development of Black Desert Online shortly after. The game uses Pearl Abyss' custom Black Desert game engine specifically created to handle the fast rendering required for its seamless world and large-scale castle sieges with a lot of characters.

After agreeing a Japanese publishing deal with GameOn Japan on 8 September 2012 Pearl Abyss began releasing details of the game to the public. In November 2012 the game was demonstrated at G-Star. Black Desert Online was also showcased at Gamescom 2013.

Black Desert Online entered closed beta testing in October 2013. A second, three week long closed beta test begun in April 2014. Open beta was launched in December 2014.

The game was released in Korea, Japan and Russia in 2015, in North America and Europe on 3 March 2016, in South America, Turkey, and countries in the Middle East and North Africa region in 2017 and Southeast Asia in 2018. Black Desert Online uses a free-to-play model in Korea, Japan and Russia, while in Taiwan, South East Asia, Europe, North America and South America the game uses a buy-to-play model.

=== Post-launch PC development ===
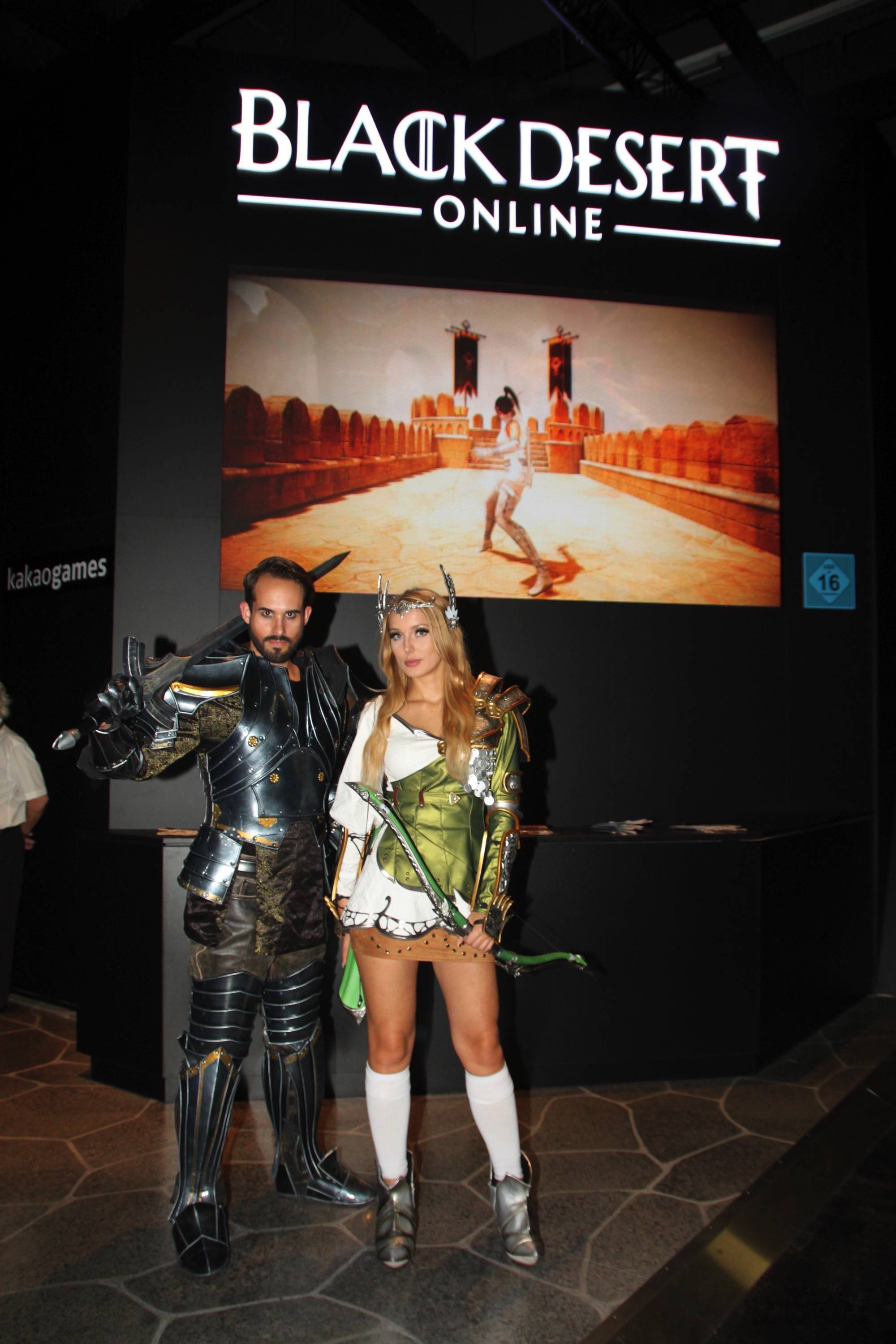
Promotion at Gamescom 2016

The Mediah Expansion was released in the North American/European version on 30 March 2016. Mediah Part 2 was released on 4 May 2016. The new classes called the Musa, the Maehwa, the Kunoichi and the Ninja were released for play in 2016, followed by the Dark Knight and the Striker in 2017, the Lahn in 2018, and the Shai in 2019. The Valencia I Expansion was released in the North American / European version on 29 June 2016. All expansions and class additions have been free of charge in the buy-to-play model, with no plans of charging for additional future content stated. An updated PC version retitled Black Desert Remastered, featuring new visuals and new audio, was released on 22 August 2018.

In October 2015, Black Desert Online was published and localized in Russia by Cypriot publisher GameNet. This contract expired on October 12, 2018, without an agreement as to account information, including character data. Pearl Abyss has apologized to Russian players and announced they would self-publish in Russia when their own localization efforts were completed. In April 2018, Pearl Abyss announced that it would be changing service providers on North American servers to improve stability. In February 2019, changes were made to the Marketplace to create the new Central Market, which features more user-friendly ways to buy and sell items from the Marketplace.

A major content update was included with the Drakania & Eternal Winter update on April 6, 2022. This update included a new region and class. Further world expansion followed in 2023. On March 8, 2023, Pearl Abyss removed Port Ratt in preparation for the release of the Land of the Morning Light expansion, which launched on June 14, 2023. Inspired by Korean folklore, mythology and the cultural aesthetics of the Joseon Dynasty. The expansion was also associated with the Woosa and Maegue classes, which were introduced prior to its release and were featured prominently in its story line. On August 23, 2023, Pearl Abyss released Ulukita, a high-level region located south of Mediah that expanded late-game content and continued the narrative of the game. The most recent content update was in August 2025, where the region of Edania was released, which sits just North of Valencia.

In Japan, Pearl Abyss Japan announced that the service is operated in 150 countries. Bonus points are given to logged-in players as a 150-country operation gift.

=== Console versions ===
At the Taipei Games Show in January 2017, Pearl Abyss stated Xbox One and PlayStation 4 versions of the game are in development, and was confirmed again by Pearl Abyss in March. The Xbox One version, simply titled Black Desert, was revealed during Microsoft's E3 2017 press conference. It was launched live in North America and Europe on 4 March 2019, following multiple beta releases since 2018. The Striker, Dark Knight, Lahn, and Musa classes were made available for the Xbox One players in April 2019. The PlayStation 4 version was released on 22 August 2019. In terms of content the Xbox version of game was about three years behind the PC version upon its release. Multiple updates in the years since its launch have seen the Xbox and PlayStation versions catch up to the PC version, though some content lag remains.

Cross-platform play for the Xbox Series X/S and PlayStation 5 consoles began in March 2020; however, the console versions have since moved to the newer platforms with natives port for both consoles on June 26, 2025, and service for the previous generation of consoles has ended due to hardware limitations.

=== Mobile versions ===
In August 2017, Pearl Abyss has released an official teaser for Black Desert Mobile. It was released for the Android and iOS in February 2018, initially only in Korea, Japan and Taiwan, with the Global version (North America, Europe and Asia) released in December 2019, during The Game Awards 2019.

=== Black Desert TV ===
In late 2025, Pearl Abyss launched Black Desert TV, a platform featuring content creators from Twitch and YouTube to promote the game and provide educational content for new and existing players.

== Reception ==
Reception

Aggregate score
Aggregator	Score
Metacritic	PC: 73/100; XONE: 75/100; PS4: 61/100

Review scores
Publication	Score
GameSpot	7/10
IGN	7.0/10

Black Desert beta has been well received. The full game has received mixed or average reviews from critics, currently holding an average score of 73/100 across the PC, PS4, and Xbox One versions on Metacritic.

In April 2016, the publisher Kakao Games announced that Black Desert Online had achieved sales of 400,000 copies in its first month on the European and North American markets and was showing an average of 100,000 concurrent users. By March 2017, Black Desert had 3.4 million registered players in North America and Europe. By May 2018, more than 1.2 million copies of the game have sold on Steam in Europe and North America. As of September 2018, the game had over 10 million registered users worldwide.

By April 2019, the game had reached over 18 million players, and its total revenue had passed $1 billion. As of September 2020, the game has reached 40 million players and grossed $1.7 billion worldwide.

== See also ==
- Guild Wars 2
- Lost Ark
- Blade & Soul
