= Pearl Abyss =

South Korean video game developer and publisher

Pearl Abyss Corp.
- Traded as: KRX: 263750
- Industry: Video games
- Founded: September 10, 2010; 16 years ago
- Founder: Kim Daeil; Youn Jaemin
- Headquarters: Gwacheon, South Korea
- Number of employees: 1,331 (August 2024)
- Website: www.pearlabyss.com/en-US

Pearl Abyss Corp. (Korean: 주식회사 펄어비스) is a South Korean video game developer and publisher, known for creating the cross-platform MMORPG Black Desert Online and the open world action-adventure game Crimson Desert.

== History ==
The company was founded in September 2010 by Kim Daeil and Youn Jaemin, previously a developer with Hangame and NHN Gaming, and began development of Black Desert Online shortly after. After the success of the game, Pearl Abyss decided to take over publishing rights and publish the game themselves rather than partnering with a third-party publisher. The success of Black Desert Online led to the development of Crimson Desert, which is a single-player action-adventure game.

On September 6, 2018, Pearl Abyss announced that they had agreed to acquire CCP Games, developer of Eve Online, for approximately US$425 million. CCP's development studios in Reykjavík, London, and Shanghai would continue under CCP Games, while the publishing and marketing functions of CCP would be integrated with Pearl Abyss. In November 2020 and June 2021, Pearl Abyss made two rounds of seed investments to Vic Game Studios, the developers of Black Clover M: Rise of the Wizard King and the upcoming Limited Zero Breakers respectively. Crimson Desert received the "Best International Game" award at the China Game Innovation Awards 2026 (CGIA), held during ChinaJoy. Pearl Abyss announced the award on August 3, 2026.

== Games ==
Year	Games	System	Genre	Ref.
2014	Black Desert Online	Microsoft Windows, Linux, PlayStation 4, Xbox One, PlayStation 5, Xbox Series X/S	MMORPG	
2018	Black Desert Mobile	Android, iOS	MMORPG	
2026	Crimson Desert	Microsoft Windows, macOS, PlayStation 5, Xbox Series X/S	Action-adventure	
TBA	DokeV	Microsoft Windows, PlayStation 5, Xbox Series X/S	Action-adventure	
TBA	Plan 8	Microsoft Windows, PlayStation 5, Xbox Series X/S	Third-person shooter, MMORPG	
Cancelled	Shadow Arena	Microsoft Windows	Battle royale, MOBA	
