= Kingdom Under Fire: Heroes =

2005 video game

- North American cover art
- Developers: Blueside; Phantagram (Note: Development support and supervision by Microsoft Game Studios Japan)
- Publishers: NA: Microsoft Game Studios; PAL: Deep Silver
- Platforms: Xbox; Windows
- Release: Xbox: NA: September 20, 2005; AU: September 30, 2005; EU: October 7, 2005; Windows: WW: June 24, 2020
- Genres: Hack and slash, real-time tactics
- Modes: Single-player, multiplayer

Kingdom Under Fire: Heroes is an real-time tactics action game developed by Phantagram and Blueside in collaboration with Microsoft Game Studios Japan, released in September 2005 for the Xbox by Microsoft Game Studios A prequel to Kingdom Under Fire: The Crusaders, the game was later ported to Windows by publisher Deep Silver.

== Gameplay ==
Both games deal with commanding large armies in epic, magical battles. When the commanding unit enters a battle, the player can control the hero. Each group or army consists of 20 to 30 soldiers, but the player is limited to only five armies and a support unit per game. A support unit, or a special unit, is an army whose main attack does not rely on the race that you control (Humans, Orcs, Dark Elves) but instead on technology for the humans and magical creatures for the Orcs and Dark Elves. Support units are directed and used as powers instead of regular army units and besides the Swamp Mammoth, all support units fly.

Besides a new storyline, commanders, and game type, there are also four new units that look like support units, but act as regular ones. The Fire Wraiths, Ice Maidens, Thunder Rhino, and Earth Golem use their respective elements to destroy enemy forces quickly.

In Heroes the player has access to seven new heroes, all of whom were in Crusaders: Ellen (half-elf), Leinhart (half-vampire), Urukubarr (ogre), Rupert (human), Cirith (dark-elf), Morene (half-vampire), and Walter (human).

Each character has their own campaign which determines the time period of gameplay. When playing as Ellen, Leinhart, or Urukubarr, the game takes place five years before Crusaders. As Morene, Cirith, Rupert, or Walter, the game takes place during Crusaders.

== Reception ==
Reception

Aggregate score
Aggregator	Score
Metacritic	78/100

Review scores
Publication	Score
Computer Games Magazine	4/5
Edge	7/10
Electronic Gaming Monthly	5.5/10 (Note: Two critics of Electronic Gaming Monthly gave the game each a score of 5/10, and the other gave it 6.5/10.)
Eurogamer	8/10
Game Informer	7.5/10
GameSpot	8.2/10
GameZone	8.4/10
IGN	8.5/10
Official Xbox Magazine (US)	8.8/10
X-Play	4/5

The game received "generally favorable reviews" according to the review aggregation website Metacritic. Edge felt that some troop types are still unable to flourish during situations when they should, some AI glitches and inconsistencies, and it feels more like a set of tweaks and fixes than a fully honed sequel. However, it was still recognised as a stirring, challenging experience which rewards a player for using levelheaded, adaptive tactics. The chaotic, brutal melee combat and support for online play was also highlighted.
