= Phantagram =

South Korean video game development studio

- Company type: Video game development studio
- Founded: 1994
- Headquarters: South Korea
- Owner: Blueside (2010-present)
- Website: phantagram.com

Phantagram (Korean: 판타그램) is a video game development studio based in South Korea. It is known for its game series Kingdom Under Fire. Phantagram co-developed the fantasy/strategy action game Ninety-Nine Nights with Q Entertainment, for the Xbox 360. It published Phantom Crash for the Xbox, which was developed by Genki.

== History ==
Phantagram was founded 1994 by a group of teenage students. They have developed video games since 1997, mostly for the popular MSX computer, such as Double Dragon and TDS. In the mid-1990s, the company became the first-generation developers in Korea.

Under their new slogan in 2000, Phantagram released their first game, Kingdom Under Fire: War of Heroes. It became a success worldwide, including in Korea. A series was later created.

Phantagram was acquired by Blueside in 2010.

== Games released ==
- PC
  - Kingdom Under Fire: A War of Heroes
  - Blade Warrior
  - Forgotten Saga
  - Zyclunt
  - Shining Lore Online
- Xbox
  - Kingdom Under Fire: The Crusaders
  - Kingdom Under Fire: Heroes
  - Phantom Crash
- Xbox 360
  - Ninety-Nine Nights (N3)
