= Comedy in video games =

Comedy in the video game medium

While some critics and designers believe the genre of comedic video games suffers from a lack of development, it has been argued that incidental comedy in video games is rather common. "Ludo-comedic consonance", an affinity between narrative and gameplay, reinforces comedy in a similar manner to how ludonarrative dissonance is a disconnect between narrative and gameplay. Both comedy and video games have historically had difficulty gaining recognition and status from academic institutions, and have been called trivial by critics. They were later both determined to be worthy of study, as scholars accepted that goal-oriented gameplay was not the sole means to experience a video game. Nevertheless, it remains common for serious games to be thought of as more artistic, while the artistry necessary to create comedy in a video game has been overlooked.

== Definition ==
Comedy when applied to video games does not always mean a game specifically designed as a comedic experience. It can refer to humorous moments in narrative (such as a witty line of dialog), in gameplay (such as a glitch, explosion, or other event resulting in slapstick humor), or through interacting with the game itself (such as a streamer becoming frustrated at a game). It is often a difficult combined effort between game developers of different disciplines, such as level designers and animators, to make a truly comedic situation.

The theory of humor in games can be separated into three main branches - superiority, incongruity, and relief/release. In the first, similar to how Plato associated laughter with hostility towards others, video games are focused on competition and defeating one's opponent. The second revolves around how one's expectation does not match the result. The third focuses on elements of comic relief, such as sidequests that provide a break from the action.

Humor is also commonly used to frame sexuality in video games without being accused of pornography, allowing for transgression of boundaries that would otherwise not be possible, although, in more problematic cases, it has been used to justify highly questionable content, such as in the controversial Custer's Revenge (1982).

== Reception ==
Stephen Totilo, writing for Slate in 2004, questioned why video games were not funny, calling them "humorless" in comparison to films and television shows. Speculating that this was caused by the difficulty of integrating comedy into gameplay, he noted that, as games moved away from text towards emphasis on graphics and action, the story and dialog was "pushed aside". He also speculated that the best solution was to make the player a "straight man".

In 2011, game designer Tim Schafer claimed that studios self-censored themselves to the point that games were unable to be comedic, out of fear of causing offense. In 2014, Chris Suellentrop of The New York Times stated his opinion that comedy was one of the least developed genres in video games besides romance, calling the greatest video game comedy up to that point Portal 2 (2011), a game that "competes with the best comedic work in any medium". Reviewing the game Jazzpunk (2014), he stated that it lacked "an emotional core", but cited Octodad: Dadliest Catch (2014) as an example of a successful humorous game.

In 2020, William Hughes of The A.V. Club stated that video games were "still fumbling clumsily" with comedy, and were in the "angry teenager punching walls" stage of their development as an artistic medium. He called funny games "outliers" that were largely in the realm of PC gaming, citing the fact that, in most games, a written script is "considered a late-development afterthought". Calling comedy in games "a matter of deliberation and thoughtfulness", he criticized games that relied on one-liners and offensive jokes as opposed to designing the entire game to support the comedy.
