= Kingdom Under Fire: The Crusaders =

2004 video game

- Cover art used in the Western world
- Developers: Phantagram; Microsoft Game Studios Japan (Note: Windows version developed by Blueside)
- Publishers: NA/EU: Microsoft Game Studios; PAL: Deep Silver
- Director: Hyunki Lee
- Producers: GilHo Lee; Jino Lee; Dee Lee
- Designer: Hyunki Lee
- Programmer: TaeYeun Yoo
- Artist: Jungsic Park
- Platforms: Xbox; Windows
- Release: Xbox: NA: October 12, 2004; EU: October 29, 2004; Windows; February 28, 2020
- Genres: Hack and slash, real-time tactics
- Mode: Single-player

Kingdom Under Fire: The Crusaders is a real-time tactics hack and slash video game developed by the Korean studio Phantagram and Microsoft's Japanese studio for the Xbox. It was published in North America and Europe by Microsoft Game Studios and other regions by Deep Silver. It is the sequel to the 2001 game Kingdom Under Fire: A War of Heroes, and continues its storyline. Kingdom Under Fire: The Crusaders combines third-person action and role-playing elements in its gameplay, which differs from its predecessor. A Windows port was released for Steam in February 2020, developed by Blueside. A DRM-free version was released on GOG.com in early April 2020. The modern Windows release came with several enhancements including full controller support, plus an all-new mouse & keyboard mode (Though, a gamepad is recommended); modern resolutions and widescreen view.

== Gameplay ==
The gameplay of Kingdom Under Fire: The Crusaders contains elements from the Dynasty Warriors games and aspects of Real-time strategy and role-playing games. As well as controlling the main character, the player fights with multiple armies or "units", which are controlled in real-time with either a minimap or the main screen. When the main character's unit engages in combat with an enemy unit, the gameplay is similar to Dynasty Warriors.

Any unit in close-quarters combat cannot be used for anything else until the combat is resolved; an exception to this is when two units are in close-quarter combat with the enemy: one unit can retreat while the other keeps the enemy unit occupied.

== Reception ==
Reception

Aggregate score
| Aggregator | Score |
|---|---|
| Metacritic | (Xbox) 81/100 (PC) 60/100 |

Review scores
| Publication | Score |
|---|---|
| Edge | 7/10 |
| Electronic Gaming Monthly | 7.83/10 (Note: In Electronic Gaming Monthly's review of the Xbox version, one critic gave it 7.5/10, and the rest gave it each a score of 8/10.) |
| Famitsu | 29/40 |
| Game Informer | 7.75/10 |
| GameSpot | 8.5/10 |
| GameSpy | 3.5/5 |
| GameZone | 8.5/10 |
| IGN | 8.2/10 |
| Official Xbox Magazine (US) | 8.4/10 |
| X-Play | 3/5 |
| Detroit Free Press | 3/4 |
| The Digital Fix | (PC) 5/10 |

The Xbox version received "favorable" reviews, while the PC version received "mixed" reviews, according to the review aggregation website Metacritic. In Japan, where the former console version was ported and published by Jaleco on January 27, 2005, Famitsu gave it a score of 29 out of 40.

The Xbox version was nominated for the "Most Surprisingly Good Game" and "Best Strategy Game" awards at GameSpot's Best and Worst of 2004 Awards, both of which went to The Chronicles of Riddick: Escape from Butcher Bay and Rome: Total War, respectively.
