= G-Star =

South Korean video game convention

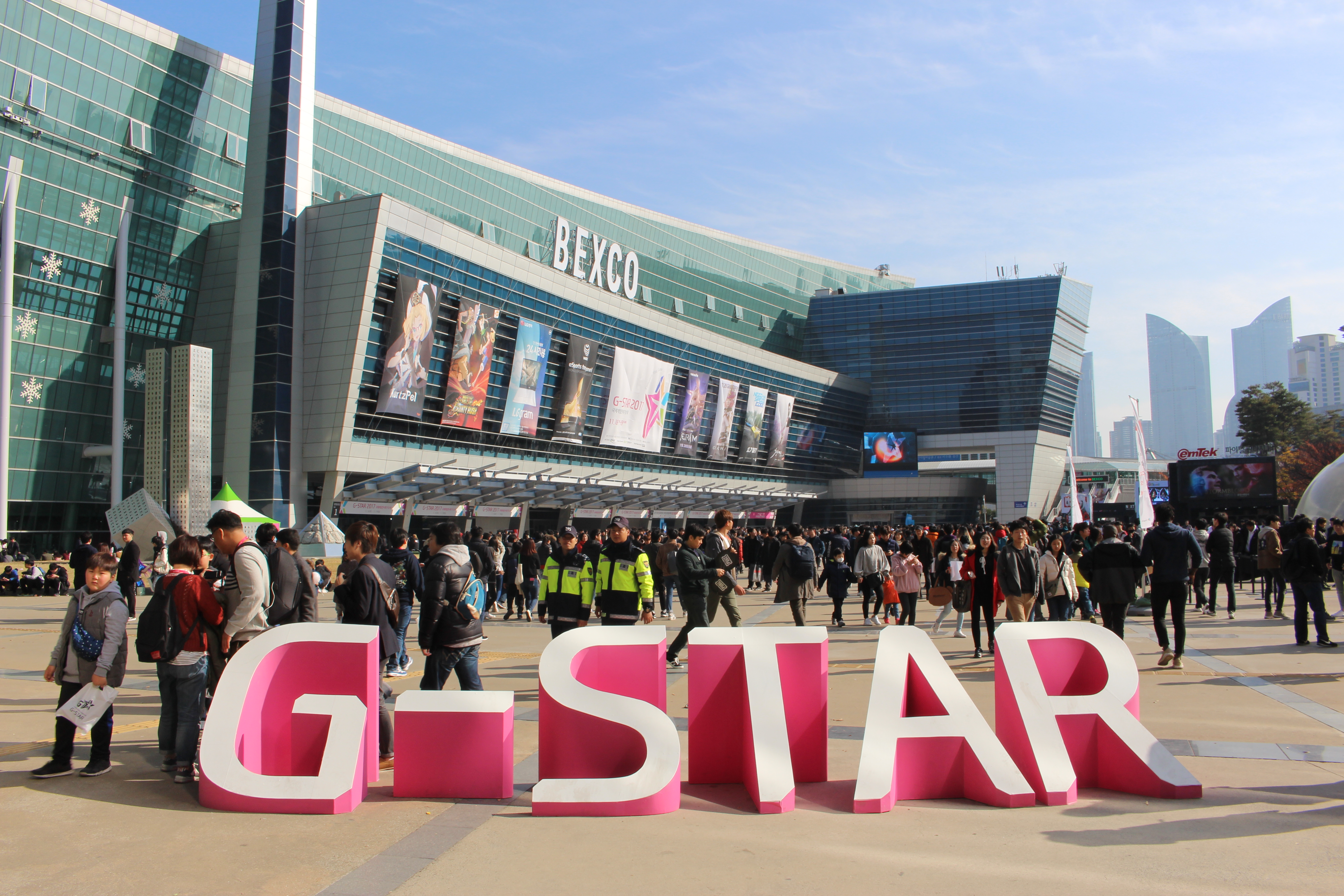
- Status: Active
- Genre: Video games, mobile games, console games
- Venue: BEXCO (2009–); KINTEX (2005–2008)
- Locations: Busan (2009–); Seoul Capital Area (2005–2008)
- Country: South Korea
- Inaugurated: 2005; 21 years ago
- Attendance: ▲215,000 (2024)
- Organizer: Korea Association of Game Industry; Busan IT Promotion Agency
- Website: gstar.or.kr

G-Star (sometimes also written G*STAR, G★ or G★STAR; Korean: 지스타; RR: Jiseuta) is an annual trade show for the video game industry presented by the Korea Association of Game Industry and Busan IT Promotion Agency in November. Originally held in the Seoul Capital Area, it was relocated to Busan in 2009.

== Attendees ==
Being a show focused on the South Korean game market, the show has a large number of online game companies, including local operators NCsoft, Netmarble, Hangame, NHN Entertainment, KakaoGames, Nexon, and Webzen, as well as overseas companies, such as Activision-Blizzard, Epic Games.

== Attendance numbers ==
Year	Total Attendees	B2B Attendees	Location
2005	n/a	n/a	KINTEX, Seoul
2006	n/a	n/a	KINTEX, Seoul
2007	n/a	n/a	KINTEX, Seoul
2008	n/a	n/a	KINTEX, Seoul
2009	n/a	n/a	BEXCO, Busan
2010	n/a	n/a	BEXCO, Busan
2011	n/a	n/a	BEXCO, Busan
2012	296,169	n/a	BEXCO, Busan
2013	188,707	n/a	BEXCO, Busan
2014	200,000+	1,656	BEXCO, Busan
2015	209,617	1,781	BEXCO, Busan
2016	161,908	1,902	BEXCO, Busan
2017			BEXCO, Busan
2018			BEXCO, Busan
2019	244,309	2,445	BEXCO, Busan
2020	n/a	655	BEXCO, Busan
2021	28,000	1,367	BEXCO, Busan
2022	184,000	2,213	BEXCO, Busan
2023	197,000	2,317	BEXCO, Busan
2024	215,000	2,211	BEXCO, Busan

== See also ==
- Korea Game Awards
