= Dead Island =

2011 video game

- PAL region PC cover art
- Developer: Techland
- Publisher: Deep Silver
- Director: Paweł Marchewka
- Producer: Adrian Ciszewski
- Artists: Paweł Selinger; Szymon Urban
- Writers: Paweł Selinger; Haris Orkin; Michał Madej
- Composer: Paweł Błaszczak
- Series: Dead Island
- Engine: Chrome Engine 5
- Platforms: Microsoft Windows; PlayStation 3; Xbox 360; OS X; Linux; PlayStation 4; Xbox One
- Release: Windows, PS3, Xbox 360: NA: 6 September 2011; WW: 9 September 2011; OS X: WW: 28 April 2014; Linux: WW: 24 October 2014; PlayStation 4, Xbox One: WW: 31 May 2016
- Genres: Action role-playing, survival horror
- Modes: Single-player, multiplayer

Dead Island is a 2011 action role-playing game developed by Techland and published by Deep Silver. Released for Linux, Microsoft Windows, OS X, PlayStation 3 and Xbox 360, the game is centered on the challenge of surviving a zombie-infested open world with an important emphasis on melee combat. The plot focuses on four playable survivors trying to survive and escape off the fictional island of Banoi.

The game was announced at the 2006 Electronic Entertainment Expo, but delayed until 2011. The game's cinematic announcement trailer was met with controversy over its depiction of a dead child. However reception was nonetheless positive, with praise going towards the emotional impact, animation and story, with the trailer being held as one of the best in any medium.

The game was released on September 2011 in North America and Europe and in October for Japan. Despite the pre-release acclaim, the game received generally lukewarm reviews. While praised for its atmosphere, gameplay and playable characters, it was also criticized for large technical difficulties and in-game glitches, graphics and most notably being hampered for lacking the emotional themes presented in the trailer. It sold over 5 million units by February 2013.

A standalone DLC expansion, Dead Island: Riptide, was released in 2013; a spin-off, Escape Dead Island, was released on 18 November 2014; and a sequel, Dead Island 2, was set to be released in 2015, but was delayed and eventually released on April 21, 2023.

A remastered version of the game, titled Dead Island Definitive Edition, was released for Microsoft Windows, PlayStation 4 and Xbox One on May 31, 2016, with a Linux version following on June 3, 2016. The remastered version was also bundled as part of the Dead Island Definitive Collection along with Dead Island Riptide: Definitive Edition, all DLC and a 16-bit side-scrolling spin-off game called Dead Island: Retro Revenge.

== Gameplay ==
Dead Island features an open world, divided by relatively large areas, and played from a first-person perspective. Most of the game-play is built around combat (mainly melee weapons) and completing quests. Dead Island is an action role-playing game and uses experience-based gameplay. The player earns XP by completing tasks and killing enemies. Upon leveling up, the player gains health and can invest one skill point into a skill tree and level up one of their skills.

Combat is carried out through either physical attacks or through the use of melee weapons and firearms. Melee weapons are emphasised to the point that firearms are not available for the first half of the game, and consist of blunt and bladed weapons. Melee weapons can also be thrown at targets at any point in the game.

Weapons are randomly generated and positioned in predetermined locations as well as found on some enemies; they have unique stats that are generally based on the player's current level. Each weapon can be upgraded three times to increase its stats, and most weapons can be "modded" – customized based on a blueprint to add special features, such as nails or electrified blades, and poison. These weapons will wear out from constant usage and require repairs and careful use, especially because once a weapon becomes damaged beyond a certain point it becomes much more expensive to repair.

There is also a stamina bar, meaning that after a set amount of physical action, such as running, jumping, or swinging a weapon, the character needs to stop to regain his or her stamina. Fighting with a high-level zombie will result in the player often running out of stamina and potentially being killed. The game features "special class" zombies, which are more powerful than the standard zombie. Players need to use flashlights in dark areas and during night-time sections, adding suspense.

Zombies in the game have different abilities, such as the Walkers being Romero-style zombies and the Infected being 28 Days Later-style running zombies. There are also other special zombies in the style of Left 4 Dead.

== Plot ==
The night after a party at a Banoi resort, four playable main characters (hereafter referred to as "the survivors"): rapper Sam B., hotel receptionist and spy for the Hong Kong Government Xian Mei, former American football star Logan Carter, and detective-turned-bodyguard for hire Purna Jackson—are awakened by a voice over the emergency intercom system directing them to evacuate the hotel. They discover that the majority of the population have been overcome by a contagious and infectious virus, turning them into psychopathic, flesh-eating creatures. Briefly overcome by one of the infected, they are rescued by lifeguard John Sinamoi.

The survivors discover that they are apparently immune from infection, and "The Voice" out of contact, the survivors are tasked by Sinamoi to try to find supplies and contact the outside world. As it becomes obvious that the resort lacks enough supplies to survive for long, Sinamoi instead has them travel to the city of Moresby to find help. The survivors take along Jin, the daughter of a bitten mechanic who modifies an armoured car they use to break out of the resort.

A promo still featuring Xian Mei about to attack a group of zombies

Upon arriving in Moresby, after taking down a new special infected known as the Ram, the survivors aid a holdout at a barricaded church. Directed first to the wealthier sections of town, they ultimately raid a supermarket under the control of "Raskol" gangs. Jin tries to offer supplies to another Raskol faction, in the abandoned police station, who capture and rape her. The gang kill the Raskol members and rescue Jin, but her actions anger Sam and Logan.

Upon their return to the resort, the survivors make contact with "The Voice": Colonel Ryder White, a Banoi Island Defense Force (BIDF) commander who is currently trapped in a high-security prison located on a remote island, only accessible through the jungle. He states that due to the characters' immunity he could create a cure/vaccine, and in-turn save his bitten wife. White directs the survivors into the jungles of Banoi having them find a smuggler named Mowen who can reach the prison.

Mowen stonewalls the survivors on the prison, but does take them to a lab studying the virus. Their researchers determine the infection is a mutation of Kuru that originated from the indigenous population. At their behest, the survivors collect a tissue sample from a native mummy to better examine the pre-mutation form of Kuru and rescue a native woman, Yerema, who was about to be sacrificed by her tribe.

Mowen finally agrees to take the survivors to the prison. After the survivors complete the preparations that he and Jin requested, they hurry back to the lab when White reports that something has gone wrong. They find the zombies the scientists were studying were accidentally released, with only Yerema still alive. Rescuing Yerema and retrieving what appears to be a prototype vaccine, the survivors proceed to the prison island.

The survivors initially help the surviving prisoners to arm themselves in exchange for reaching White, but when White finally contacts them again he urges them to abandon the prisoners and proceed to him. The prisoners' holdout eventually falls and Mowen dies helping Jin and Yerema escape. As the survivors are about to reach White, however, they are hit with a knockout gas inside their elevator. Awoken by a tech-savvy prisoner named Kevin, they learn that White stole the vaccine and intends to flee with his wife and call in a nuclear strike to purge the island.

Racing to the roof helipad, the survivors find themselves held by White at gunpoint. Jin, disgusted by White's plan, releases White's now-zombified wife from her restraints, and she bites White on the wrist. White kills his wife and shoots Jin dead, then injects himself with the vaccine, only for it to accelerate and amplify his own mutation. The survivors kill White, then finally escape Banoi with his helicopter as Kevin intones that things will never be the same.

=== Ryder White campaign ===
Two weeks prior to the outbreak, Ryder White, a Colonel in the B.I.D.F, is interviewed by a commanding officer. He is presented with a series of targets and asked if he would kill each without question. White agrees he would kill all including, after some hesitation, his wife Emily. Those viewing the interview note this and have him reassigned to Banoi, where Emily also works. They speculate that he will not "push the button because of her".

Upon the zombie outbreak, White oversees the bombing of bridges to slow the infection, but his helicopter crashes in Moresby when the co-pilot turns. Alerted that the main bridge in Moresby remains intact, he proceeds to recover the demolition charges from the Raskols and carry out the demolition himself. He is contacted by Emily, who has taken shelter inside the prison with the help of a man known as Kevin.

Upon extraction from Moresby, White hears from Emily that she has been bitten by one of her zombified patients. Disregarding his wife's pleas to leave her, White has himself dropped off at the prison, intent on saving her before ordering a nuclear strike to purge the island. By the time he arrives Emily has almost turned. Kevin then contacts White over the intercom, offering to help him as well. When they meet, however, White identifies Kevin as Charon, a notorious terrorist-affiliated hacker. However, with no other options, he follows Charon's instructions to restore emergency power and find antibiotics for Emily, fighting off armed escaped prisoners. Charon also tells White he has survivors en route with an antidote.

After administering the antibiotic to Emily, Charon notifies him that a group of prisoners are approaching in reprisal for the ones that White killed to obtain the Tetracycline. With the prisoners dead, White travels to the control room in Block C and meets up with Charon. As White approaches, he discovers that Charon was behind the deaths of the scientists at the Laboratory, including Dr. West, but hides his suspicion. He is then instructed to clear the zombies from the shower room in Block C for when the Heroes arrive.

With the shower room cleared, White uses the sewers to return to the control room. While eavesdropping on Charon's conversation with the group (the survivors from the main campaign), he discovers that Charon has been posing as him (The Voice). Out of rage, White threatens to kill Charon for endangering Emily and making him betray his country. Charon then assures him that the group have the "antidote" and that the Heroes will not trust either White or Charon if it is revealed that they were never actually speaking to White. Charon then instructs White to store knockout gas above the elevator lift that the group will be using, so they can steal the antidote from them and avoid having to negotiate.

After placing the gas and returning to the control room, Charon and White watch the Heroes pass out from the gas. Before leaving to retrieve the gas, White destroys the control room's computer to prevent Charon from pulling any more tricks. He then locks Charon in the control room and tells him that he is going to get the antidote for Emily. Charon replies to White stating that the antidote would only work on people that were in the early stages of Infection, which Emily is already well beyond. Shaken by his words, White runs off to get back to Emily in the intensive care unit. With White gone, Charon reveals that he had a hidden backup key card and taunts him stating that White should have killed him when he had the chance.

Afraid of being too late, White collects the antidote from the group and frantically fights through countless waves of Zombies to get back to Emily. Upon finding her, White finds she has already become an Infected. White then vows to make a complete antidote out of the serum. He brings Emily to the roof where he discovers that Charon has turned the group against him. Jin releases Emily to attack White, forcing him to kill his wife. White then kills Jin in retaliation. He injects himself with the antidote only to discover that it was actually an enhanced version of the virus, which transforms him into a powerful Special Infected. He is then killed by the group. The survivors then flee to safety using White's helicopter. It is revealed that Charon plans on using Yerema as what Dr. West called her, "a walking timebomb", to spread the virus.

== Development ==
A promotional film, created by UK animation studio Axis Productions and directed by Stuart Aitken, featuring the transformation of a young girl into a zombie, played in a nonlinear sequence, was commented upon by Ben Parfitt of MCV. Parfitt praised the trailer itself, but criticised the online reaction to it, writing "It's a video that uses an image of a dead girl and images of her dying to create an emotional bond with a product."

Wired exclaimed, "It may be the best video game trailer I've ever seen; gorgeous, well-edited and emotionally engaging." However Wired urged caution, stating that Techland did not make the trailer and that "everyone is hyped up about a short film, not the game itself."

Dead Island was originally announced on 8 August 2007 and stated to be released in 2008, developed by Techland and produced by Adrian Ciszewski, but was delayed. An official teaser trailer, titled "Part 1: Tragedy Hits Paradise", was released on 17 May 2011 featuring various gameplay aspects. A follow-up trailer, titled "Part 2: Dead Island Begins", was released on 6 June 2011 along with the announcement of the game's release being set for 6 September 2011 for the US and 9 September 2011 for the worldwide release.

The game's zombies were rendered to have fully modelled layers of meat and muscle, meaning they have a multi-layered damage system with real-time injuries. On 9 August 2011, Deep Silver announced that Dead Island's development had finished and that production had begun.

== Marketing and release ==
The original Dead Island logo (top) and the censored version for release in North America (bottom)

In Australia, a collector's edition was available to pre-order exclusively from EB Games Australia. The collector's edition came with a Turtle Beach X12 headset, Ripper weapon DLC and Bloodbath Arena DLC. The collector's edition in Canada has the Ripper and Bloodbath DLC. On 20 July, Dead Island became available for pre-purchase on Steam as a single copy of the game for full price, or a four pack with one free copy. Both the single copy and the four pack include the Ripper and Bloodbath DLC.

In PlayStation Home (North American version), the PlayStation 3's social gaming network, users could pre-order Dead Island from a special kiosk in the Central Plaza (Home's central meeting point redesigned for this promotion and includes a "Zombie Survival" minigame) and receive an "Exploding Zombie Outfit" (features a remote option for users to explode) for their Home avatar.

Deep Silver funded a four-part series of comedic short films written and starring hosts of Talkradar from the video game journalistic website GamesRadar, titled Dead Island: Secret Origins. The films depict fictionalised versions of the hosts who travel to Dead Island and become zombies out of choice. There is also a novelisation with the same name, released by Bantam Books on the same date to accompany the game. The novelisation differs slightly from the game, with more mature themes and an alternate ending that was presumably unsuitable for the game.

On 21 March 2011, gaming licenser ESRB announced that the original version of the Dead Island logo was not suitable for release in North America, and Deep Silver was told to change it. Instead of the hanging corpse in the original logo, it was changed to a zombie standing by the tree. This logo change appears on the boxart of the North American release (the logo in-game, however, remains unchanged), with the logo remaining unchanged in other territories. In Australia, the game was released a day early, instead of its intended release date, 9 September by EB Games Australia.

The game was not released in Germany due to the amount of violence. It was sold in some German online stores such as Amazon Germany for a limited time. It was indexed as "media harmful to youth" by the Bundesprüfstelle für jugendgefährdende Medien (BPjM) in November 2011. The game was removed from the index in January 2019.

Dead Island was offered for free to Xbox Live users with a Gold Membership as part of Microsoft's "Games with Gold" program. It was available to download from Xbox Live until 15 February 2014.

== Dead Island: Riptide ==
On 3 November 2011, Techland registered the name "Dead World". When questioned about this, they denied a sequel was in production. On 5 June 2012, at E3 2012, Techland officially announced another game in the Dead Island universe, a stand-alone expansion under the title Dead Island: Riptide. The ending of Riptide also hints toward another continuation.

== Related media ==
=== Comic ===
A one-issue comic book version of the series was released by Marvel Comics, and begins with Roger Howard, an investigative journalist, as he looks into the illegal exploitation of Banoi Island's resources. He appeared in the game as a voice, leaving behind tape recordings.

The story begins just as Roger Howard arrives. He explains why he is at the Royal Palms Resort, and then begins to target Kenneth Ballard the Royal Palms' manager. After gaining access to his office, Roger finds detailed files on Xian Mei, Purna, Logan Carter, and Sam B. After going through the files, Roger hears a knock on the door. Before opening it, he begins to explain that he was looking for the bathroom.

Unfortunately, after opening the door, he comes face-to-face with a zombie. The story then ends, with Roger's fate unknown. In the video game, audio logs of Roger are found, with him slowly going insane from being infected, and when the survivors reach the prison, they find his last audio log, which implies a prison guard killed him once he became infected, with the log found next to (presumably) Roger's corpse.

The audio logs detail his journey, which is revealed that he and a group of survivors tried to escape into the jungle, but crashed. The driver and Roger were attacked by an infected Orangutan, with the driver dying and Roger escaping. Roger makes it to the prison, and he states he is making this log for scientists to see the full symptoms of infection, and starts hallucinating about his son.

=== Film ===
On 27 September 2011, Lionsgate announced that they had acquired the rights to develop a film based on the game's release trailer, as its portrayal of a family desperately fighting for their lives provided artistic inspiration. On 1 August 2014, it was announced that Occupant Entertainment and Deep Silver would produce and finance the film; little is known about the film as of yet other than it was expected to be started around 2015.

=== Novel ===
A novelisation, based on events which take place within the game's storyline, was released concurrently in September 2011.

== Reception ==
Reception

Aggregate score
Aggregator	Score
Metacritic	PC: 80/100; PS3: 71/100; X360: 71/100; PC (Definitive Collection): 70/100; PS4: 63/100; XONE: 67/100

Review scores
Publication	Score
Computer and Video Games	6.5/10
Edge	3/10
IGN	8/10
Official Xbox Magazine (UK)	7/10
Official Xbox Magazine (US)	8/10

Dead Island received generally lukewarm to positive reviews from critics. Aggregating review website Metacritic gave the PC version 80/100, indicating "generally favorable reviews", while the Xbox 360 version received a score of 71/100, and the PlayStation 3 version received a score of 71/100, indicating "mixed or average reviews".

IGN gave the game an 8.0/10, criticizing the game presentation, glitches, various bugs for the consoles, and texture loading, but praising the atmosphere and overall feel of the game and stating that the game's pro points are significant enough to outweigh its con points. Official Xbox Magazine (UK) gave the game a score of 7.0/10, stating that while it falls short of its potential, there is more than enough to make up for the in-game issues, while the US version gave it 8.0/10.

Computer and Video Games awarded the game a more mixed score of 6.5/10, stating, "This budget zombie thriller ain't too pretty but could manage to capture a cult following." However, Edge magazine gave Dead Island a 3/10 score referencing a very large number of gameplay and technical issues.

The Microsoft Windows version of the game received many negative reviews from magazines and websites stemming from an accidental release of a development build of the game on Steam. This included features such as noclipping and the ability to toggle the third-person perspective. Rock, Paper, Shotgun also noted that the code revealed references to the Xbox 360 version. Developer Techland released a first-day patch seeking to address as many as 37 issues. A patch for the console versions has been released and fixed many issues, including corrupted savegames. As of 17 August 2013, the PC version still had many user reports of gamebreaking bugs including being unable to use savegames. This software was replaced on Steam and other distribution sites in 2016 by the Definitive Edition, which uses a different game engine (though is unlikely to be bug-free itself).

"Gender Wars", an unlockable skill for the playable character Purna which increases her combat damage against male opponents, was referred to during development as "Feminist Whore". Although changed throughout the game before release, the original name could still be found in debug code on the PC version. Publisher Deep Silver described the line in question as a "private joke" made by one of the developers, and regretted its appearance in the final product.

=== Sales ===
Dead Island has sold over 5 million units by February 2013.

== Sequels ==
On 7 August 2013, Deep Silver announced a new game titled Dead Island: Epidemic. As a MOBA (multiplayer online battle arena) game, Epidemic had three teams of players battling one another for survival while facing the hordes of undead that inhabit the series. On 19 May 2014, Epidemic was released through Steam early access, allowing players to actively participate in the final development stage of the game, reporting bugs and issues within the game so that the release is polished. Epidemic was a free-to-play title. In 2015, the game was cancelled during the open beta phase.

On 9 June 2014, Dead Island 2 was announced during the PlayStation E3 press conference. Unlike the somber trailer, the new title's trailer is vibrant and comedic similar to the Dead Rising series. The game was in development by Yager Development, before moving to Sumo Digital. It was then moved to Dambuster Studios, and was officially released on April 21, 2023.

On 1 July 2014, Escape Dead Island was announced. The game was developed by Fatshark and was released in November 2014 for PlayStation 3, Xbox 360, and Microsoft Windows.
