= Dead Island (series) =

- Genres: Action role-playing, survival horror
- Developers: Techland, Dambuster Studios, Fatshark, Stunlock Studios
- Publisher: Deep Silver
- Platforms: Windows, OS X, Linux, PlayStation 3, PlayStation 4, PlayStation 5, Xbox 360, Xbox One, Xbox Series X/S
- First release: Dead Island; September 6, 2011; 15 years ago
- Latest release: Dead Island 2 April 21, 2023; 3 years ago

Dead Island is an action role-playing survival horror video game series published by Deep Silver for Windows, PlayStation 3, Xbox 360 and mobile platforms iOS and Android. There are four installments in the series, with the latest one released on April 21, 2023. Dead Island is centered on the challenge of surviving a zombie-infested open world island with a major emphasis on melee combat.

Dead Island was originally announced at E3 2006, but was pushed back to 2011. It was initially released on September 6 in North America, September 9 in PAL regions, and October 20 in Japan. A stand-alone expansion, Dead Island: Riptide, was released in 2013 while a sequel, Dead Island 2, was released in 2023.

A spin-off, Escape Dead Island, was released in 2014. A MOBA game based on the Dead Island series called Dead Island: Epidemic was cancelled during the open beta phase in 2015. The free-to-play title had been available on Steam early access since May 2014, but eventually never saw a full release and was completely shut down.

== Video games ==
Game	Details
Dead Island Original release date(s): NA: September 6, 2011; PAL: September 9, 2011; JP: October 20, 2011	Release years by system: 2011 – PlayStation 3, Xbox 360, Windows, OS X, Linux
Dead Island Original release date(s): NA: September 6, 2011; PAL: September 9, 2011; JP: October 20, 2011	Notes: A first-person action role-playing survival horror video game.; First game in the series, developed by Techland and published by Deep Silver.; Utilizes Techland's in-house Chrome Engine.
Dead Island: Riptide Original release date(s): NA: April 23, 2013; AU: April 23, 2013; EU: April 26, 2013; JP: July 11, 2013	Release years by system: 2013 – PlayStation 3, Xbox 360, Windows
Dead Island: Riptide Original release date(s): NA: April 23, 2013; AU: April 23, 2013; EU: April 26, 2013; JP: July 11, 2013	Notes: Last game in the series developed by the IP creator Techland.; Acts as a standalone expansion to the original Dead Island
Escape Dead Island Original release date(s): NA: November 18, 2014; EU: November 21, 2014; AU: November 28, 2014	Release years by system: 2014 – PlayStation 3, Xbox 360, Windows
Escape Dead Island Original release date(s): NA: November 18, 2014; EU: November 21, 2014; AU: November 28, 2014	Notes: A third-person adventure video game with a cel-shaded art style.; Acts as a spin-off of the series.; Utilize the bitSquid Engine.; Set between Dead Island and Dead Island 2; Developed by Fatshark and published by Deep Silver.
Dead Island: Epidemic Original release date(s): December 8, 2014	Release years by system: 2014 – Windows
Dead Island: Epidemic Original release date(s): December 8, 2014	Notes: A multiplayer online battle arena (MOBA) video game; Acts as a spin-off of the series; Developed by Stunlock Studios and published by Deep Silver; Shut down in September 2015
Dead Island: Definitive Edition Original release date(s): May 31, 2016	Release years by system: 2016 – PlayStation 4, Xbox One, Windows
Dead Island: Definitive Edition Original release date(s): May 31, 2016	Notes: A high definition remaster of both Dead Island and Dead Island: Riptide.; Also includes Dead Island: Retro Revenge, a side-scrolling bonus game developed by Empty Clip Studios in collaboration with Platform and Powerhouse Animation Studios.
Dead Island Survivors Original release date(s): July 4, 2018	Release years by system: July 4, 2018 – Android, iOS
Dead Island Survivors Original release date(s): July 4, 2018	Notes: Game was shut down in July 2020.
Dead Island 2 Original release date(s): April 21, 2023	Release years by system: 2023 – PlayStation 4, Xbox One, Windows, PlayStation 5, Xbox Series X/S
Dead Island 2 Original release date(s): April 21, 2023	Notes: A first-person action role-playing video game.; First game in the series to be released on the eighth generation consoles and ninth generation consoles.; Acts as the second main entry in the series.; Formerly developed by Yager Development and Sumo Digital and development duties were later shifted to Dambuster Studios.; Utilizing Unreal Engine 4.

== Related media ==
=== Comic ===
A one-issue comic book version of the series was released by Marvel Comics. It begins with Roger Howard, an investigative journalist, as he looks into the illegal exploitation of Banoi Island's resources. He appeared in the game as a voice, leaving behind tape recordings.

The story begins just as Roger Howard arrives. He explains why he's at the Royal Palms Resort, and then begins to target Kenneth Ballard the Royal Palms' manager. After gaining access to his office, Roger finds detailed files on Xian Mei, Purna, Logan Carter, and Sam B. After going through the files, Roger hears a knock on the door. Before opening it, he tries to explain that he was looking for the bathroom. Unfortunately, after opening the door, he comes face-to-face with a zombie. The story suddenly ends, with Roger's fate unknown. In the video game, various audio logs of Roger are found, with him slowly going insane from being infected. When the survivors reach the prison, they find his last audio log, implying a prison guard had killed him once becoming infected, with the recording found next to (presumably) Roger's corpse.

The audio logs detail his journey. Revealing that he and a group of survivors tried to escape into the jungle, but had crashed. The driver and Roger were attacked by an infected Orangutan, with the driver dying and Roger escaping. Roger makes it to the prison, and states he's making this log for scientists to see the full symptoms of infection, but starts hallucinating about his son.

=== Film ===
On September 27, 2011, Lionsgate announced that they acquired rights to develop a film based on the game's announcement trailer. As its portrayal of a family desperately fighting for their lives provided artistic inspiration. The studio was reported to join with Occupant Entertainment (Producer Co.) and Deep Silver (Gaming Co.) with filming set to begin in 2015. As of 2022 no official update has been given.

=== Novel ===
A novel based on the events of the first game, and written by Mark Morris was released concurrently with Dead Island in 2011.
