= The Cycle: Frontier =

2022 video game

- Developer: Yager Development
- Publisher: Yager Development
- Engine: Unreal Engine 4
- Platform: Microsoft Windows
- Release: June 8, 2022
- Genres: First-person shooter, extraction shooter
- Mode: Multiplayer

The Cycle: Frontier (formerly titled The Cycle) was a 2022 first-person shooter video game developed and published by Yager Development. Yager describes this game as a "competitive quest shooter" and labels it with the cross-genre "PvEvP", a combination of player versus environment and player versus player. The game was released on Windows via early access in August 2019, and was launched in full on June 8, 2022.

In June 2023, Yager announced that the game servers would be sunset on September 27, 2023, at which point it would no longer be playable.

== Gameplay ==
The Cycle: Frontier was a first-person shooter, with a play style that has been compared to Escape from Tarkov. Set in a future where interstellar travel is possible, the game focuses on a group of humans living on a space station called the Prospect Station. Players take on the role of prospectors; mercenaries tasked with the job of landing on a dangerous planet called Fortuna III. Players have to compete against each other, as well as the unforgiving environment, scavenging loot and completing quests before extracting. Any equipment not insured will be permanently lost in case of death. Three major factions, the Independent Civilian Advisory (ICA), Osiris, and Korolev offer contracts they want the player to complete. Players have the option of dropping solo, in a duo or in trios; and game instances last six hours before refreshing.

The Cycle: Frontier launched with two maps, and has features including crafting, customising load-out and character appearance, as well as a "battle pass" system.

== Gameplay in early access ==
The game known as The Cycle is a first-person shooter of the PvPvE variety (a combination of player versus environment and player versus player) with a unique twist on the battle royale genre. The twist consists of:

- The gear store, a shop that can be displayed at anytime in a match. It contains the weapons and abilities you have chosen prior to the match, and a bike. In order to by them, you need to earn credits, by killing monsters, looting or completing contracts.
- Meta-progression currency (known as Krypto-Marks) that lets players unlock new weapons or abilities.
- Multiple Suit to choose from, acting like an archetype, each having its own mechanics and upgrades.
- Contracts, located through the map, are the source of Victory Points (usually shorten as VP). They go from basic PvE ressource gathering to PvP area defense. In Solo game mode, personal contracts are added, being unique to each players, even if players are in a Pact.
  - The ability to form or disband temporary squads with other players during a mission (known as Pact). XP/Credits gain and Contracts progress are shared, but shield is lost.
    - Arc Raiders, developed and launched later by different developers, has the same social functionality.
- When you die for the first time, you respawn and have to pick up your Battery in order to not get Foamed the next time you get killed. Getting Foamed puts you in spectator until end of the match.

Starting a match, players are dropped on the outskirts of the map, and have to complete the most Contracts possible in a 20 minutes time span. Survive encounters with enemy players and monsters or complete contracts, to climb the leaderboard with "victory points". In 20 minutes the evac ship arrives and the storm completely takes over the map, shooting high-damage lightning at random, making monsters stronger, and generating red crystals on the ground (known as "surge crystals"). The crystals are worth picking despite high chance of lightning strikes, as they can be your final push to winning in the leaderboard. 5 minutes after the ship arrives, the storm becomes so strong that players begin taking damage from the atmosphere everywhere on the map. At the end of match, you will get more "krypto marks" and syndicate XP for scoring higher in the leaderboard, but only if you successfully evacuated.

Several game modes are available:

- Solo. 20 solo players on the map, pacts are enabled.
- Duo. 10 squads of 2 players on the map, pacts are disabled.
- Squad. 5 squads of 4 players on the map, pacts are disabled.
- Warden's Relics. Created by the revival project volunteers.
- Deathmatch. 10 solo players on the map, infinite respawns, starting with 700 credits, smaller map, and the only contract is Eliminate Rivals.
- Tutorial. A classic tutorial level with preset gear and gameplay, and a long-winded tutorial guide.
- Training Match. Just like the Solo mode but it features less monsters, no enemy players, and a guide that explains the contracts you stumble upon.
- Shooting Range. Single player testing map. Players start with 10000 credits and can access the field shop, pick up scattered weapons and abilities, shoot practice targets (including an aim trainer), or load into different contract scenarios. Players cannot earn XP.

The lore and setting of the game are similar to the full release described in #Gameplay.

== Development ==
The initial development plans started shortly after Yager had finished working on Dreadnought. The Cycle: Frontier ended up being revealed at Gamescom 2018, eight months after. The goal was to combine the narrative with social dynamics. It was released into early access on the Epic Games Store in August 2019.

The Steam release initially set for December 2020 was delayed to some time in early 2021 due to changes in development plans and being hindered by the COVID-19 pandemic.

In June 2023, Yager released a statement that the servers for The Cycle: Frontier are scheduled to be sunset on September 27, 2023. Yager stated that continued support for the game was "unfortunately not financially viable", and that the game would not be playable offline or in private servers due to its "dedicated backend system, which doesn't allow keeping the game somewhat available after being shut down".

=== Revival projects ===
There are 2 active revival projects as of 2026, none of them are affiliated with Yager. Both projects have functioning game servers (to a varying degree), their games and community channels can be accessed completely for free via Discord: Re:Cycle works on The Cycle: Frontier (exctraction shooter), TC: Storm Runners works on The Cycle (battle royale).

== Reception ==
Reception

Aggregate score
Aggregator	Score
Metacritic	58/100

Review scores
Publication	Score
PC Gamer (US)	55/100
PC Games (DE)	7/10
NME	2/5

The Cycle: Frontier received "mixed or average" reviews, according to review aggregator platform Metacritic. This can also be reflected in the Steam Store Reviews.

PC Gamer lamented its formulaic design, writing, "Without any kind of narrative hook or any kind of subversiveness at all, and little moment to moment reward, a list of unlocks can't possibly compel me to invest that kind of time."

It gained popularity when played by Summit1g on Twitch.

The game peaked at 40,854 active players in June 2022 which slowly averaged downwards over the course of its lifespan.
