= Dead Island 2 =

2023 video game

- Developer: Dambuster Studios
- Publisher: Deep Silver
- Directors: David Stenton; James Worrall
- Designer: Adam Duckett
- Artist: Adam Olsson
- Writer: Ayesha Khan
- Composer: Ryan Williams
- Series: Dead Island
- Engine: Unreal Engine 4
- Platforms: PlayStation 4; PlayStation 5; Windows; Xbox One; Xbox Series X/S; Amazon Luna; macOS
- Release: 21 April 2023 (Note: It was released for Amazon Luna on 6 May 2025, and macOS on 24 July 2025.)
- Genre: Action role-playing
- Modes: Single-player, multiplayer

Dead Island 2 is a 2023 action role-playing survival horror game developed by Dambuster Studios and published by Deep Silver. It is a sequel to Dead Island (2011) and the third major installment in the series. Set about 15 years after the events of the original game and Dead Island: Riptide (2013), the game follows six playable characters (dubbed Slayers) as they attempt to escape a full quarantine restricted zone in Los Angeles in the midst of a zombie apocalypse. Instead of a large open world like its predecessor, Los Angeles is split into 10 different open zones, which players can freely explore. Players can use a variety of melee weapons, firearms and explosives to dispatch enemies. The game utilized a procedurally generated dismemberment system, used to create weapon-appropriate wounds on zombies.

Announced in 2014, Dead Island 2 endured a lengthy development period and saw several changes in the studios attached to the project. The developer of the original game, Techland, started the project in 2012, though Deep Silver disagreed with its creative vision and instead tasked Yager Development, the developer of Spec Ops: The Line (2012) to develop the sequel. The size of the project and its focus on online multiplayer proved to be challenging for a small team. Yager was removed in 2015 and replaced the following year by Sumo Digital, which was then replaced by Dambuster, an internal studio of Deep Silver, in 2018. Despite not being an island, Los Angeles was chosen to be the game's setting due to its diverse locations and culture, which fit with the overall motif of the franchise.

Announced in August 2022, the final iteration of Dead Island 2 was released for PlayStation 4, PlayStation 5, Windows, Xbox One, and Xbox Series X/S in April 2023. The game received generally positive reviews from critics, which praised the game's visuals, setting and gameplay, though its story and combat received criticisms. The game sold more than 3 million units by May 2024, surpassing Deep Silver's expectations and becoming its fastest-selling game. It was nominated for Best Action Game at The Game Awards 2023. Dambuster Studios released two downloadable content packs for the game. A sequel titled Dead Island 3 is set to be released in 2028.

== Gameplay ==
Players can use a variety of melee weapons, such as a sledgehammer, to fight against zombies in Dead Island 2.

Like its predecessor, Dead Island 2 is an action role-playing game played from a first-person perspective. While players can play the game solo, it also supports three-player cooperative multiplayer. Dead Island 2 takes place in Los Angeles in the midst of a zombie apocalypse. At the beginning of the game, players select from one of six playable characters as their player avatar, called a Slayer, each with their own unique skills and abilities. They have to choose from one of two defensive abilities, either learning to block or dodge hostile attacks; a well-timed dodge or block can open up opportunities for counterattack. The game's world is divided into 10 different zones. While the player can freely explore each zone, they must travel between different zones through Zone Exits. As the player progresses in the game, they will unlock fast travel points, allowing them to travel to different locations quickly. Each location also has their own side quests and unique zombie types.

Players can pick up both ranged and melee weapons to defeat enemies. Both types of weapons are divided into four different categories, each having their own combat focus and facilitating a certain playstyle. For instance, headhunting weapons deal devastating damage to an enemy's head, while maiming weapons can effectively tear their limbs. Each weapon also has their own attributes; for example, Force dictates how much the player character's stamina will be drained while using it, while Speed determines how frequent the player can swing the weapon consecutively. Weapons can be further customized with mods, which add elemental effects, and perks, which can alter the player's stats. Players can equip any two throwable weapons (dubbed "Curveballs" in-game) at a time, each with a short cooldown after use. The game features a system named "FLESH" (Fully Locational Evisceration System for Humanoids), a procedurally generated dismemberment system which can create weapon-appropriate wounds on zombies, allowing players to break their skin, bones and internal organs. Weapons are divided into different tiers of rarity, with Rare and Superior weapons being generally more powerful. Players can also use the environment to their advantage; for instance, an electric weapon can be thrown into a puddle, electrocuting all enemies standing on it. Weapons will gradually degrade and eventually break, though players can repair them at workbenches. The workbenches can also be used to upgrade and scrap weapons, as well as crafting ammunition and medkits using materials and blueprints found in the game's world.

Unlike previous games in the series, Dead Island 2 does not have a skill tree. Instead, it uses a deck-building system which allows players to alter their character's strengths and weaknesses. The Skill Deck sorts cards into four different categories: Abilities, Survivor, Slayer, and Numen. Abilities cards unlock new active abilities for players, some of which can be used during the Fury mode, which allows players to unleash devastating attacks on enemies for a brief period of time; Survival cards boost the player's health and stamina; Slayer cards grant players passive perks that enhance their combat abilities; and Numen cards unlock special abilities that have a large damage output. Players can also equip "Autophage" cards, which provide perks to the player but also debuff them, making them weaker. Cards can be earned through completing quests, levelling up, and killing special enemies. As players progress, they will also complete combat challenges, in which they can earn additional rewards, such as an increase in health or additional bonuses to critical damage.

== Plot ==
About 15 years after the events of Dead Island, the US military is forced to put Los Angeles under a full quarantine restricted zone due to a new and stronger zombie outbreak. As Los Angeles is being quarantined, six individuals (dubbed "Slayers") board one of the last evacuation flights out of the city, but an infected person ends up on board, and the military shoots the plane down. The Slayers narrowly survive the crash but are bitten trying to help other survivors. They manage to make their way to the home of one of the crash survivors, actress Emma Jaunt (Hannah Steele), who reluctantly shelters them despite their infection. Sam B (Cavin Cornwall), Emma's ex-boyfriend, arrives at the mansion intending to get Emma out of the city, and, revealing he is immune to the infection, the Slayers realize they are also immune. With the Slayers still intent on escaping the city, they head to the nearest evacuation center, to find it overrun by the infected. They recover a radio and contact Dr. Reuben Reed (Colin McFarlane), a CDC doctor who asks them to come to his safe haven in Santa Monica to use their immunity to synthesize a cure.

The Slayers head through the sewers to get to Santa Monica, discovering that the zombie corpses the military have been dumping into the sewers have melded together into a massive, tumor-like growth spreading underneath the city. They are stopped by another group of survivors led by Lola Konradt (Pippa Winslow), who drops the Slayers into a pit full of zombies, temporarily triggering a bestial rage in them, which they use to kill all the zombies. The Slayers manage to reach Reed's haven at a hotel, where he informs them that the military will not extract them unless they provide proof of immunity. The Slayers recover the equipment from the overrun CDC headquarters and return to discover that Reed and Konradt are acquaintances. The Slayers are then sent to find Reed's missing daughter, Tisha (Jessica Hayles), who gives the Slayers a way to contact Konradt directly.

Konradt tips the Slayers off about a secret lab where Reed sent other immune subjects. While fighting an infected test subject, the Slayers succumb to their feral instincts and attack Tisha, who apparently kills them, only to be revived by Konradt. Konradt explains that she, her followers, and the Slayers are a new species of humans, dubbed "Numen", who can assimilate the infection, named the "Autophage". Numen retain their mental fortitude, share a telepathic hive mind, and gain extraordinary abilities such as increased strength, speed, or the ability to enter into a rage of fury. Before leaving, she warns the Slayers that Reed is not actually searching for a cure. The Slayers return to confront Reed, only to find that he has fled with Tisha to a lab on Hollywood Boulevard and that he was responsible for the city-wide outbreak.

Furious at constantly being lied to, the Slayers gather Emma, Sam, and helicopter pilot Patton (Mel Raido), intending to steal Reed's helicopter and leave the city. They reach Hollywood Boulevard, where Sam starts succumbing to the Autophage, his immunity deteriorating. The Slayers confront Reed, who admits that he released the Autophage in the city to filter out Numen, explaining that the Autophage is not a plague but a "clock" fundamental to the human genome that is hard-coded to wipe them all out and turn them into zombies at a predetermined time, but also turn one in every million humans into Numen. The Numen, who he considers anomalies, and their "god blood" were his only way to find a method to neutralize it. He gives the Slayers a single dose of Autophage cure and reveals that Tisha also carries the remedy in her body, as he had secretly injected her with Numen blood prior to birth to harvest the cure for the rest of her life. Reed succumbs to the Autophage, forcing the Slayers to kill him while Tisha flees.

The Slayers return to Sam, Emma, and Patton and administer the cure to the former, saving his life. The Slayers decide to stay behind to find Tisha and help the other survivors trapped in the city. As Emma, Sam, and Patton escape Los Angeles, Konradt and her followers watch over the Slayers as they fight another horde of zombies.

=== Haus ===
The Slayers receive a mysterious invitation to a seaside mansion in Malibu called the Haus. Upon entering, they find the Haus is the headquarters of a doomsday cult whose leader Konstantin foresaw the zombie outbreak and tried to prepare them for it. In order to enter the Haus' inner sanctum, the Slayers gather the heads of three of the cult's leaders: Vincent, Veronique, and Yong-Ho, who are all cybernetically enhanced and can survive in their decapitated state. However, Yong-Ho turns out to be infected by the Autophage, forcing the Slayers to kill him. They then proceed into the inner sanctum of the Haus, where they discover that Konstantin is actually an artificial intelligence dedicated to preserving humanity, and had been preparing for the outbreak by digitally uploading the minds of as many humans as he could into an Ark in order to ensure humanity can survive. However, the zombie infection has breached the Haus and threatens to destroy the Ark. Konstantin reveals he had arranged for the Slayers to get infected with the Autophage because he predicted they would play a key role in saving in the Ark. The Slayers clear out the infection from the Haus to save the Ark, and as a reward, Konstantin gives them special cybernetic implants.

=== SoLA ===
The Slayers head to the ruins of the SoLA music festival where they meet a lone survivor, Grace, who warns them that a mysterious "Beat" turned all of the festival guests into zombies at once. Intrigued, the Slayers investigate the various Mood Speakers scattered around the SoLA stages and discover that one of Konradt's followers, Cadenza, is also investigating the Beat. They retrieve various pieces of the Beat from alternate universe versions of Cadenza and give them to their universe's Cadenza, who explains the Beat is some kind of message meant specifically for Numen. Investigating further, the Slayers learn, to their horror, that the Beat is a special frequency that triggers the Autophage, and Cadenza plans to use the sound equipment in SoLA to broadcast the Beat across the world against Konradt's wishes. The Slayers help Grace, who they discover is also a Numen due to her resistance to the Beat. They confront Cadenza, who is completely hypnotized by the Beat. Grace helps break the spell over Cadenza and they work together to stop the Beat. Cadenza refuses to tell the Slayers what she learned about the Beat and takes her leave, while Grace warns the Beat is still trying to breach their reality, so she will stay at SoLA in case it returns.

== Development ==
=== Extended development hell (2012–2018) ===
The original Dead Island (2011) and its sequel, Dead Island: Riptide (2013), were developed by Polish developer Techland and published by Deep Silver. However, there was already creative friction between the two companies during the original game's development, with Techland director Adrian Ciszewski saying that Deep Silver's control over the title prevented the studio from realising their vision for the original title, as the publisher was more focused on getting the game released. Upon launch, Dead Island was a large commercial success, and Techland decided to pitch a sequel to the publisher in 2012. Codenamed "Dead World", Techland wanted the new project to be bigger and more ambitious than the original game. It would have freerunning mechanics and a more serious story, focusing on the survivors and how the zombie apocalypse would influence peoples' behaviours and personality. Deep Silver, feeling that Techland's vision strayed too far from the original game, decided to turn the project down. Techland went on to create a separate zombie game named Dying Light with Warner Bros. Interactive Entertainment using the same ideas, while Deep Silver sent out requests for proposal to various studios to look for pitches of a sequel.

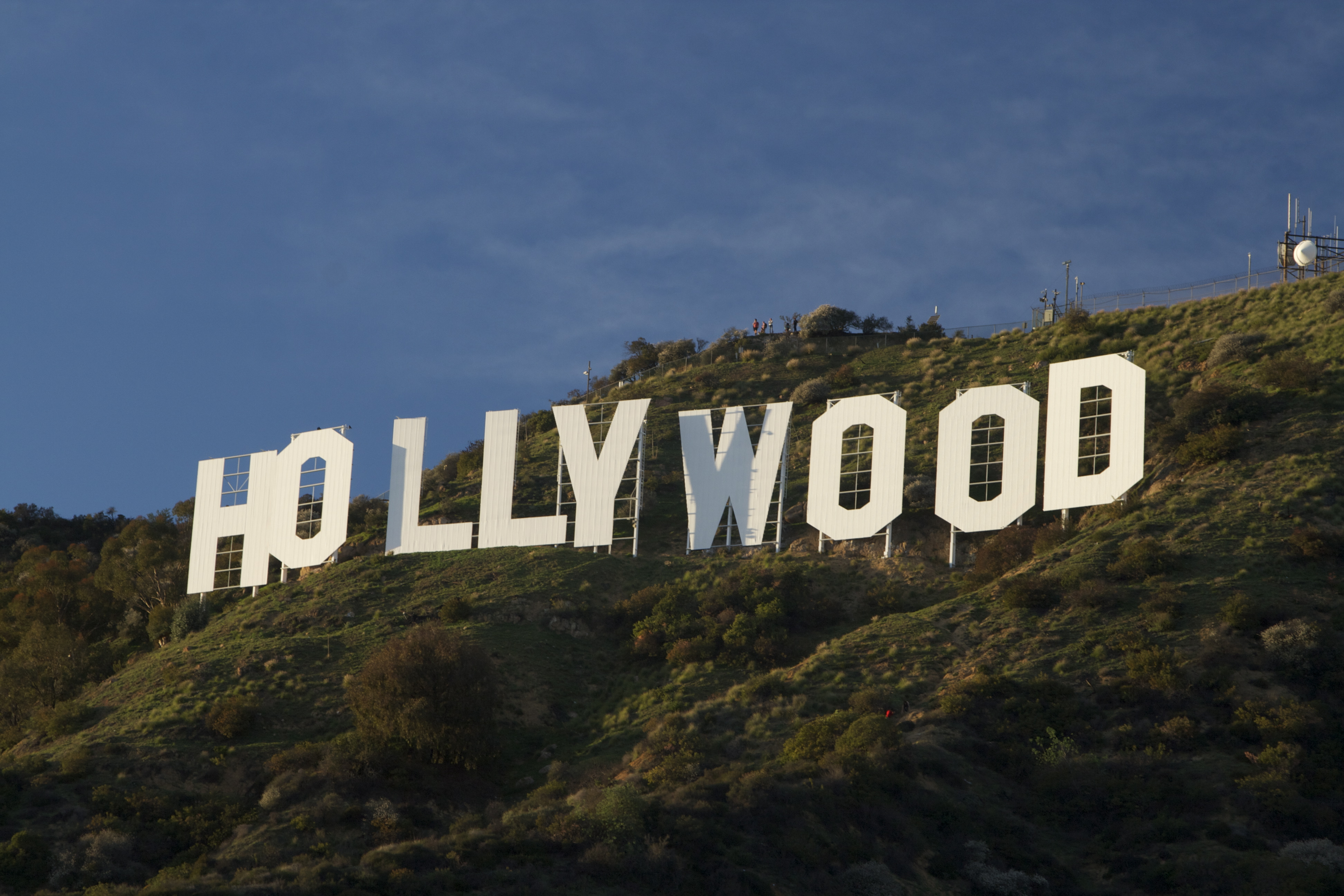
Both Yager Development's and Dambuster Studios' versions of the game were set in Los Angeles.

Yager Development was the game's first developer. It was most known for developing Spec Ops: The Line, a third-person shooter with a heavy narrative. Yager began pitching to Deep Silver for the project around the time Spec Ops: The Line launched worldwide in 2012. As it was the lowest bidder for the project, it was chosen as the developer for the sequel. Their pitch retained core gameplay elements of the original game and shared a similar lighthearted tone. According to team members working at Yager, it would have simply been the same game "in a different setting with potentially much, much higher production values". California was chosen to be the game's primary setting, with the player travelling between multiple open locations, such as San Francisco, Los Angeles and Redwood National Forest. Yager wanted these locations to be dense, allowing players to enter every building's interiors. The locations were created to be vibrant, based on how they would be depicted in postcards and mass media. As a lighthearted game, the team was inspired by Zombieland, especially its quirky characters with unusual motivations, and its story in which survivors get a "second chance at life" during a "zombie holiday" where they can make the best out of their situation. Deep Silver also wanted the game to have "seamless multiplayer"; it would have featured a persistent, "shared world" mechanic in which up to eight players in the same lobby are free to interact with each other however they want within the same game world, and the lobby would remain active until all players in the session left. The team described the game as the "world's smallest MMO".

As development progressed, the team encountered a range of technical challenges. They discovered that Unreal Engine 4 was not well-suited for an open-world game, resulting in significant performance issues on consoles. The decision to make building interiors fully explorable also introduced numerous technical problems, which Yager was unable to resolve even with assistance from Epic Games, the engine's creator. The studio's lack of experience working on multiplayer projects, the small budget, and its small size added to the challenge of creating a functional online game. Yager's "flat" corporate structure, aimed at promoting employee autonomy, resulted in the studio being directionless. As a result, Yager began missing project deadlines. Deep Silver brought in engine architects from Volition and consultants from Toadman Interactive to aid the project, though they separately concluded that the game was beyond salvagable. While the team tried to solve the issues by making the open locations smaller and significantly downplaying its MMO component, Deep Silver took the project away from Yager in July 2015. Timo Ullmann, the Managing Director of Yager Development, attributed this split to the two companies' visions for the project falling out of alignment. Losing the project was described by Ullmann as a "catastrophic" event for Yager, and Yager Productions GmbH, the single-purpose division created to develop the game, filed for insolvency, resulting in significant layoffs. Martin Wein, former Head of Communications of Deep Silver, noted that Yager had failed to reiterate the project after receiving player feedback, and that its direction ultimately did not align with feedback following an extended period of playtesting and market analysis. He commented that Yager's version was a bad game that would've been profitable, but would have killed the franchise. A playable version of the still-under-development game from 2015 was leaked in June 2020.

After Yager was forced to leave the project, Deep Silver tasked British studio Sumo Digital to develop the project. According to CEO Klemens Kundratitz, Sumo Digital, which had experience in creating AAA games such as LittleBigPlanet 3 and Crackdown 3, was chosen to lead the project as it understood the brand and shared the same creative vision for the franchise as the publisher. However, despite Deep Silver's multiple attempts at reassuring fans and investors that the game was still deep in development, it announced in 2019 that development duties would be shifted to Dambuster Studios, an internal studio which previously worked on Homefront: The Revolution.

=== Under Dambuster Studios (2018–2023) ===
After the release of Homefront: The Revolution, which received a lackluster critical reception, Dambuster Studios began trying new ideas and hiring new talents for the studio. Whereas the team felt that Homefront was overambitious and complex, the studio wanted to make a game that had a narrower but more focused vision. The studio experimented early with the FLESH system and began developing a gameplay prototype of a zombie game around it. It was the most popular prototype developed by the studio at the time, and became the foundation for Dead Island 2 when Dambuster Studio was tasked to finish the sequel. Dambuster decided to completely discard materials made by Sumo and Yager, restarting from scratch.

Dambuster identified the weakness of the previous two versions and Homefront: The Revolution as being too complex. As a result, the core development philosophy for this game was to allocate resources to only several aspects of the game and ensure that they were well-made. As a result, the cooperative multiplayer was limited to only three players and vehicular traversal was removed from the game to make level design more manageable. The team labelled four major pillars of development: "paradise gone to hell", "visceral combat", "pulp tone" and "zombie core". California was retained as the game's primary setting, and though they discussed the inclusion of alternative locations such as Catalina Island, the setting was ultimately limited to only Los Angeles. The team felt that LA's postcard-like locations perfectly matched the franchise's core premise, which often sees a picturesque setting fallen into chaos. LA was also considered to be a more diverse setting than an island resort, and its expressive culture and identity gave an opportunity to add over-the-top, eccentric characters to the story. To ensure that the zombies felt like former residents of Los Angeles, the team designed them to reflect the lifestyles and characteristics of the specific districts they inhabited.

Combat was identified as an important pillar for the development, with creative director James Worrall describing it as "visceral" and "tactile". The team first created the gameplay abilities of the six playable characters, and then a story and a personality are created around them. Unlike contemporary zombie games, Dead Island 2 solely focused on the idea of having zombies as the main enemy and the zombie outbreak itself the core of the story, and intentionally avoided delving into more serious themes and stories about human survivors. Dambuster Studios felt that an outlandish combat did not mesh well with a "strait-laced" story, adding that this disassociaton was one of the flaws of the original Dead Island. Game director David Stenton compared the game to "Saturday night blockbusters"; one that was "pulpy" and its world "larger-than-life". Worrall further added that the team was inspired by horror movies from the 1980s to 2000s, such as Robocop, Nightmare on Elm Street, and Alien and Predator. As combat was considered a major aspect of the game, the team did not envision Dead Island 2 as a survival horror video game. Gameplay mechanics such as weapon degradation were designed to draw players to workbenches, where they could discover new ways to modify their weapons; they were not intended as a mechanism to instill realism.

== Release ==
The game was initially first announced at E3 2014 with a targeted Q2 2015 release window. Following a gameplay demo at Gamescom 2014, no further gameplay footage was released. Over the course of development, the game changed developers three times. The final iteration of Dead Island 2 was shown at Gamescom 2022, and was initially scheduled to release on 3 February 2023. It was first delayed to 28 April 2023, to allow for additional development time, and then its release date was moved up a week to 21 April. The German version is censored. The player cannot further maim fallen enemies. On Windows, the game was released with a one-year exclusivity on the Epic Games Store. The game released on Steam on 22 April 2024. When the game was released, it was one of the first video games to use Alexa Game Control, allowing players to distract zombies through their own voice using Amazon's voice activated software. Players who pre-ordered the game received the "Memories of Banoi Pack", which added cosmetic items based on the setting of the original game.

The game's first story expansion, titled Haus, was released on 2 November 2023. It introduced a new location (a large villa in Malibu, California), three weapons, and eight skill cards. A second story expansion, titled SoLA Festival, was released on 17 April 2024. Set in abandoned music festival grounds, the expansion also added several new weapons and enemy types. On 22 October 2024, a New Game Plus mode, a cooperative horde mode named "Neighbourhood Watch", which was co-developed by Fishlabs, and a weapon pack based on Kingdom Come: Deliverance II, were released. Deep Silver also released the Ultimate Edition, which bundled the base game with all its downloadable content packs, on the same day. The game was released for Amazon Luna on 6 May 2025, and macOS on 24 July 2025.

== Reception ==
Reception

Aggregate score
| Aggregator | Score |
|---|---|
| Metacritic | (PC) 75/100 (PS5) 73/100 (XSXS) 76/100 |

Review scores
| Publication | Score |
|---|---|
| Game Informer | 7.75/10 |
| GameSpot | 7/10 |
| GamesRadar+ | 3.5/5 |
| IGN | 7/10 |
| PC Gamer (US) | 55/100 |
| The Telegraph | 3/5 |
| The Guardian | 3/5 |
| VG247 | 4/5 |

Dead Island 2 received "generally favorable" reviews for the PC and Xbox Series X/S versions, while the PlayStation 5 version received "mixed or average reviews" from critics, according to review aggregator Metacritic. The game was nominated for "Best Action Game" at The Game Awards 2023 and British Game at the 20th British Academy Games Awards.

Several critics praised the game's focus and ability to provide mindless escapism to players through its core gameplay loop of killing and slashing zombies. Wesley LeBlanc from Game Informer enjoyed the skill cards, writing that they added to the game's replayability and encouraged players to experiment. He also strongly praised the gore system, for being "shocking"; the level of weapon customization; and the ability of players to leverage environments in the world to defeat zombies. Mark Delaney from GameSpot praised the game's varied weapons and enemy types for contributing to a combat system that required thoughtful thinking and strategy. Several critics felt that the combat in the game was repetitive and monotonous, and late-game additions to combat failed to offer any significant deviation to the core gameplay formula. Leon Hurley from GamesRadar remarked that for players to enjoy the game, they needed to accept that "it's 95% hitting zombies with sticks". Its mission design was also criticized for being uninspiring and repetitive, the controls of ranged weapons received frequent criticisms for its imprecision, and several critics also noted that the game's difficulty was inconsistent.

Wesley strongly praised the game's setting, describing it as "bright" and "saturated" and adding that the locations in the game were "lovingly designed". Hurley praised the game's visual design, and wrote that the levels in the game "gradually expand in scale and ambition". Delaney felt that the team's ditching of the original game's open world design was a decision that benefited the title, adding that the side quests and secrets in each location were rewarding to discover. Edwin Evans-Thirlwell from Eurogamer noted that level design in the game resembled that of immersive sims, though he felt that the studio only merely scratched the surface of such design. Jordan Olomon from Polygon was surprised by the game's environmental storytelling, which contributed to a "strong sense of place". In a more negative review, Keith Stuart from The Guardian criticized the world for being similar to a theme park, and disliked how it was partitioned into multiple small sections separated through loading screens.

Critics agreed that the story of the game was forgettable and incoherent, and its depictions of eccentric personalities have been compared to Grand Theft Auto V. Critics were divided on the game's quality of writing. Delaney felt that it was as bad as its predecessor and called it "grating", Dan Silver from The Daily Telegraph described it as "unrepentantly puerile", and Stuart felt that the game maintained "an endearing sense of its own ridiculousness". Several critics also noted that the game lacked originality.

=== Sales ===
Dead Island 2 sold 1 million units in 3 days since release. It was the best-selling video game in its launch week in the UK, and the second best-selling video game in the US in April 2023, behind only Star Wars Jedi: Survivor. The game sold over 2 million units one month after release, exceeding the studio's expectations and became the largest launch ever for a Deep Silver game. By May 2024, it had sold 3 million units. In September 2025, Deep Silver announced that Dead Island 2 had surpassed 20 million players.

== Sequel ==
Development of Dead Island 3 was confirmed in 2025. The game is currently in production at Dambuster Studios, and is set to be released in the first half of 2028.
