= Dead Island Reveal Trailer =

2011 video game trailer

- Title screen
- Client: Deep Silver
- Market: Worldwide
- Language: English
- Media: Video
- Running time: 187 seconds (3:07)
- Product: Dead Island
- Release date: 16 February 2011
- Directed by: Stuart Aitken
- Music by: Giles Lamb
- Production company: Axis Productions
- Produced by: Andrew Pearce
- Country: United Kingdom

The announcement trailer for the video game Dead Island was developed by Techland and published by Deep Silver on 16 February 2011. Produced by Axis Animation, with music by Giles Lamb, it depicts a family who is attacked by a horde of zombies in a hotel. The trailer was designed to be emotional, allowing players to care for the characters and setting the game apart from competing titles; however, it does not show any gameplay footage.

Within days, the trailer amassed nearly a million views. It was praised for its tone, storytelling, and emotional weight, but received some criticism for its lack of gameplay information and its depiction of a dead child. Retrospectively, the trailer has been praised as superior to the game itself. Lionsgate once planned to release a film adaptation of the trailer, but the licensing rights ultimately expired.

== Plot ==
Playing largely in reverse and slow motion, the trailer follows a young girl and her parents as they face a zombie outbreak while vacationing on Banoi, a volcanic island near Papua New Guinea. The girl flees a horde of zombies toward her parents' hotel room, only to be caught and bitten. The girl's mother places her unconscious body on a bed as her father tries to fend off the zombies with a fire axe. During the fight, the girl turns into a zombie and attacks her father, biting his neck, which forces him to throw her out of a window in self-defense. The girl falls to the ground and dies, reverting to her human form as she does so. The trailer concludes with home footage of the family's arrival on Banoi.

== Background ==
Deep Silver (logo pictured) gave general ideas to the company that created the trailer.

Dead Island was officially announced in 2007 by Techland. Set in a zombie-infested tropical island called Banoi, the game focuses heavily on melee combat. In 2009, Techland said its publishing agreement restricted it from releasing further information. The trailer was released via the YouTube channel of IGN on 16 February 2011. It was produced by Axis Animation, which had created trailers for Killzone 2 and Mass Effect 2. Audiomotion and Dimensional Imaging were also involved in the creation of the trailer.

== Development ==
Anton Borkel, the creative consultant at Deep Silver, received a design document outlining the game's broad concepts. From it, they understood only that the game was meant to be a brutal, movie-like experience with a heavy emphasis on hand-to-hand fighting. Borkel led the team that designed the trailer. It was initially designed to showcase large amounts of violence to gain viewer attention; Borkel rejected this pitch for its perceived lack of originality. The development team then pivoted to a concept depicting negative aspects of a zombie apocalypse, highlighting a family's unpreparedness and helplessness. The trailer is made up of computer imagery and does not show any gameplay footage of Dead Island. The team was inspired by the Carousel advertisement by Philips, which they perceived as a piece of art: the team hoped that the Dead Island trailer would be perceived similarly.

According to Stuart Aitken, the director of the trailer, Deep Silver allowed Axis to create their own characters instead of using the in-game protagonists. Borkel described the trailer as a short film set within the Dead Island universe. They intended to use the trailer to depict the background information of the game, presenting information regarding the discovery of the outbreak and its unstoppable nature. The team excluded guns from the trailer, feeling their presence would distract from the story. They also felt that excluding them helped separate the game from rival first-person zombie shooters like Left 4 Dead. To make the trailer feel non-linear and focused, the team narrowed the trailer's location to a hotel room. Deep Silver wanted the trailer to have some exterior environment, so the team added a segment with the daughter falling from the hotel window, where the audience would glimpse the island setting. An early version of the trailer took place through the lens of a camcorder; though this concept was scrapped, residual footage was used to show the family's vacation before the outbreak.

Borkel added that the team used the trailer to build up the mood and atmosphere for the game. According to Deep Silver brand manager Vincent Kummer, Techland designed quests which required players to help people who had lost their families in the main game, with the goal of making players feel that they were the only hope existing on the island. Trying to establish the audience's emotional connection to the trailer's characters, despite the trailer's short length, the team decided to tell a story of a typical family unit. The mother was originally the one that turned into a zombie, but the team switched the role to the daughter, whom they considered more vulnerable, hoping to evoke greater sympathy from viewers. The team felt that the child's death showcased the feral nature of the zombies, triggering an urgent protective instinct within viewers. Non-chronological storytelling was introduced so that the action and violence featured would not seem excessive. The trailer intercuts to a chronological depiction of the zombie attack on the daughter in an effort to heighten the drama.

The marketing team debated whether they should release a chronological version of the trailer, but Borkel decided against it, opting to let the community recreate the timeline themselves to drive better engagement. Deep Silver proposed to mitigate the violence by having the trailer presented in slow motion, as they believed that it could make the action feel "balletic" instead of purely violent. Much of the violence in the trailer was directed at the zombies, as the team felt that depicting the family's fear and helplessness was more interesting than showing the brutality of their deaths.

The trailer's music was composed by Giles Lamb, who worked for a soundtrack development company called Savalas. The team used sharp audio during action scenes, and softer, melodious tracks during peaceful moments. Its melancholic and refined presentation was designed to juxtapose with the gore in the trailer.

== Reception ==
According to Mulligan, nearly a million people had viewed it on YouTube within days, exceeding Deep Silver's expectations of 100,000 views. Dead Island was one of the most searched items on Google, YouTube, and Twitter for several days, and became one of the most anticipated titles of late 2011. By 2018, the trailer had amassed more than 16 million views on YouTube.

The trailer's unexpected popularity prompted Deep Silver to adjust the game's marketing campaign. While Deep Silver Chief Operating Officer Geoff Mulligan said that the team had modified the main game's gameplay and slightly altered the story in response to the trailer's positive reception, producer Sebastian Reichert added that it was not "necessary" for the team to alter anything from the game, as the trailer was only designed to demonstrate "how desperate the situation in the world of Dead Island is". Several journalists noted that the preview build of the game did not match the emotional tone of the trailer. (Note: Cited to multiple sources) Reichert attempted to adjust expectations by comparing its gameplay to Borderlands rather than emotional experiences like Heavy Rain. Borkel remarked that the game's story concerned a "bigger picture of the situation on Banoi and less on an individual tragedy".

Wired described the trailer as a "masterpiece" with "the trappings of the classic Hollywood teaser" while Keza MacDonald, writing for VG247, called the trailer "advertising as art". The trailer's narrative was praised by several reviewers, especially the emotional impact of the girl. Other critics considered the trailer controversial due to its graphic depiction of the family's death, and criticised the gruesomeness of their deaths as a marketing technique to sell the game.

Jason Schreier from Wired said that the trailer had successfully made a saturated genre feel fresh again. The lack of gameplay information was criticized, and critics pointed out that the trailer did not include any gameplay clips. Some were concerned that the trailer would cause players to expect an emotional story that would not be present in the game. Deep Silver producer Sebastian Reichert dismissed claims of false marketing, arguing that the trailer highlighted the game's "serious setting".

The trailer was given a gold award at the Cannes Lions International Festival of Creativity in the Internet Film category.

== Legacy ==
Kirk Hamilton from Kotaku wrote that the trailer set expectations too high for the game, while Sean Cleaver from Vice felt that the trailer miscommunicated to players what the game contained. Haris Orkin, a writer for Techland, noted that the trailer "brought so much attention to Dead Island [that it] created an expectation for a tone that really isn’t possible to pull off in a game where you’re decapitating zombies". Will Adams, a creative director for visual effects company The Mill, noted that the trailer ultimately became more memorable than the main game and overshadowed it.

A recut version of the trailer that shows the story in chronological order was released by G4TV, while a live-action remake was released by fans of the trailer. The announcement trailer for Dead Island: Riptide, released in 2012, featured a similar, depressing tone. A trailer for Goat Simulator in 2014 also mimicked the format of the Dead Island announcement trailer. Lionsgate acquired the rights to develop a movie based on the trailer, though the licensing deal had expired. Deep Silver released a musical tribute to the trailer, coinciding with the launch of Dead Island: Definitive Collection in May 2016.
