= Dead Island: Riptide =

2013 video game

- Developer: Techland
- Publisher: Deep Silver
- Director: Paweł Marchewka
- Producers: Jacek Brzeziński; Marek Soból
- Designer: Jacek Brzeziński
- Programmers: Krzysztof Sałek; Tomasz Soból
- Artists: Krzysztof Kwiatek; Łukasz Skurczyński
- Writers: Jan Bartkowicz; Tomasz Duszyński; Magdalena Tomkowicz
- Composer: Paweł Błaszczak
- Series: Dead Island
- Engine: Chrome Engine 5
- Platforms: Microsoft Windows; PlayStation 3; Xbox 360; Linux; PlayStation 4; Xbox One
- Release: Windows, PlayStation 3, Xbox 360: NA: April 23, 2013; AU: April 23, 2013; EU: April 26, 2013; Definitive Edition; Windows, PlayStation 4, Xbox One: WW: May 31, 2016; Linux: WW: June 3, 2016
- Genre: Action role-playing
- Modes: Single-player, multiplayer

Dead Island: Riptide is a 2013 action role-playing game developed by Techland and published by Deep Silver. Released in April 2013 for Microsoft Windows, PlayStation 3, and Xbox 360, Riptide serves as a continuation of the story of 2011's Dead Island, with the original four survivors, plus a new survivor, arriving on another island in the Banoi archipelago, which has also been overrun by zombies.

Dead Island: Riptide received a mixed reception from critics, who cited that the game did not fix any of its predecessor's problems, nor add anything new to the gameplay. The next mainline entry in the series, Dead Island 2, was revealed at E3 2014. It was originally set for a 2016 release; however, the game entered development hell after the project was moved over from Yager Development to Sumo Digital in 2016. The development of Dead Island 2 changed hands again in 2019, this time to an internal studio of Deep Silver, Dambuster Studios, and was eventually released on April 21, 2023.

A remastered version of the game, titled Dead Island: Riptide Definitive Edition, was released for Microsoft Windows, PlayStation 4 and Xbox One on May 31, 2016, with a Linux version following on June 3, 2016. The remastered version was also bundled as part of the Dead Island Definitive Collection along with Dead Island Definitive Edition, all DLC and a 16-bit side-scrolling spin-off game called Dead Island: Retro Revenge.

== Plot ==
Riptide takes place immediately after the ending of Dead Island, with the four immune survivors landing on a military ship after escaping from the prison island. They are immediately taken into custody by the Australian Defence Force Colonel Sam Hardy and Frank Serpo, a civilian VIP.

Passing out from sedatives, the player's character wakes up to find the ship overrun with zombies. Serpo flees via helicopter shortly before the ship crashes into a rock. The immune regain consciousness on the shore of the island of Palanai and are found by Harlow, a WHO researcher, who tells them the zombie infection has spread there as well. Colonel Hardy tells the immune that Serpo's organization is interested in weaponizing the Kuru strain that caused the zombie outbreak.

The survivors decide to travel to the city of Henderson, in hopes the nearby army base can offer help. With no intact bridges or working boats, the survivors instead investigate a tunnel to reach a pier. A researcher, Dr. Kessler, reveals that the zombie-creating virus mutation was created by exposure to chemical weapons which were stored in the tunnels. The immune clear the tunnels and fight their way to Henderson.

The immune find the military base and contact Serpo; he tells them that Hardy is not to be trusted, and sends a helicopter to evacuate the survivors. When Serpo's helicopter arrives, the survivors shoot it down. Serpo reveals that Harlow is a terrorist looking to seize data and a vaccine from a quarantine zone. The survivors find Harlow. She tells them the outbreaks were started deliberately to test the virus and there is no vaccine. Harlow takes the mutagen again and attacks the survivors, who kill her.

When the immune find a boat, they are greeted by Serpo again; he freely admits to orchestrating the outbreaks, but offers the immune medical help if they come with him. The immune instead leave him to the zombies and evacuate the island with the five other survivors in their party.

The pre and post-credits scenes reveal that the high majority of the people they have helped throughout the game had been killed by zombies as their respective holdouts were overrun by the infected.

After a 6-day skip their boat washes ashore into an unknown location and attracts the attention of a nearby local. Sam B's music is played out loud and getting more and more intense as the camera pans on the deck hatch groans can be heard coming from below. The hatch's latch twists and turns and the camera fades to black leaving the fate of our heroes ambiguous.

== Marketing and release ==
The game was first announced in June 2012, and in September 2012, the first teaser trailer was released. A music video for a song called "No Room in Hell" was released in November 2012 by rapper Josef "J7" Lord (who in the song is named Sam B as the main character from Dead Island), for promotion and featured Chamillionaire. A new trailer released in March 2013 titled "They Thought Wrong" showed new gameplay, characters, and enemies.

In Japan, the game was published and localized by Spike Chunsoft.

=== Mutilated torso promotion ===
The fiberglass statuette as a promotional item with the "Zombie Bait Edition" of the game

In January 2013, Deep Silver announced that Dead Island: Riptide would be available in a "Zombie Bait Edition", which would include a statuette of the bloodily dismembered torso of a bikini-clad woman. Marketing materials described it as the game's "take on an iconic Roman marble torso sculpture" and "a striking conversation piece". The American market version of the statuette has the "Stars and Stripes" patterned bikini, while the European counterpart has a Union Jack pattern.

The statuette caused an overwhelmingly negative reaction from the video game press and from activists. Journalists described the statuette as "gross", as something not even a sociopath would want, or as a "text book example of the most extreme ends of misogynist fantasy, a woman reduced to nothing but her tits, her wounds hideously depicted in gore, jutting bones, and of course barely a mark covering her globular breasts". Within hours of the announcement, Deep Silver's UK branch issued a statement that they "apologize for any offense caused" and that they "sincerely regret this choice", reiterating "how deeply sorry we are, and that we are committed to making sure this will never happen again". Deep Silver's US branch disavowed any part in the promotion. In April 2013, video game media reported that the "Zombie Bait Edition" did not seem to have been withdrawn from sale, and that Deep Silver's parent company had made an "extremely limited quantity" of the mutilated torso statuettes available to retailers in Europe and Australia.

=== Retail versions ===
Dead Island: Riptide has been released in a variety of different editions. Available versions include the standard version, limited edition, special edition, 'survivor' edition, 'Rigor Mortis Collector's' edition, and 'Zombie Bait' edition, with a variety of extra physical (notebooks, bobble figurines, and bottle openers) and in-game (character skins and weapons) content provided.

== Reception ==
Reception

Aggregate score
Aggregator	Score
Metacritic	PC: 61/100; PS3: 62/100; X360: 57/100

Review scores
Publication	Score
Destructoid	5/10
Edge	3/10
Eurogamer	6/10
Game Informer	8/10
GameSpot	4/10
GamesRadar+	4/5
GameTrailers	7.5/10
Giant Bomb	2/5
IGN	7.2/10
Joystiq	2/5
PC Gamer (US)	45/100
Polygon	5.5/10
The Telegraph	2/5
The Guardian	3/5

Dead Island: Riptide received mixed reviews, with most critics praising the gameplay and new setting, but criticizing the many unfixed issues found in the original, as well as the lack of new content. Aggregating review website Metacritic gave the PlayStation 3 version 62/100, the PC version 61/100, and the Xbox 360 version 57/100.

IGN's Greg Miller stated that although he found it to be 'great gory fun', it still contained bugs and glitches that were found in the first game. He also stated that 'it was tempting to simply paste the original Dead Island review on the page and call it a day'. He praised the gameplay, co-op and the ability to import your save from the original, noting that the enemies you face are at scale with your level, so that the game gives you an appropriate challenge, but criticized the storyline and overall look of the game. He went on to say that it didn't do much to improve itself from its predecessor in terms of overall performance. However, he did state that the lackluster graphics and performance could be overlooked by how much fun it is to play. Miller gave the game a 7.2 out of 10.

GameSpot's Mark Walton heavily criticized the game, saying: "Dead Island: Riptide might look like an idyllic zombie-fest, but it's little more than a frustrating mess of half-baked ideas and repetitive combat.". Walton gave the game a 4 out of 10.
