= Escape Dead Island =

2014 video game

- Developer: Fatshark
- Publisher: Deep Silver
- Series: Dead Island
- Engine: Autodesk Stingray
- Platforms: Microsoft Windows, PlayStation 3, Xbox 360
- Release: NA: November 18, 2014; EU: November 21, 2014; AU: November 28, 2014
- Genres: Action-adventure, survival horror
- Mode: Single-player

Escape Dead Island is a 2014 action-adventure survival horror video game developed by Swedish developer Fatshark, published by German studio Deep Silver and distributed by Square Enix in North America for PS3 and Xbox 360 and by Valve for PC. It is the second Dead Island spin-off.

Escape Dead Island is a survival mystery game that follows the story of Cliff Calo, who sets sail to document the unexplained events rumored to have happened on Banoi. Arriving on the island of Narapela, part of the Banoi archipelago, he finds that not everything is as it seems.

== Gameplay ==
Escape Dead Island is a third-person action-adventure video game with an emphasis on stealth and melee combat, with some gunplay. Players can crouch to sneak up on enemies and execute them from behind, or engage enemies in melee by swinging a melee weapon at them. Melee utilizes light attacks, heavy attacks, and a dodge move. Specific enemies can be locked onto to focus the camera and the player's attacks on them. A silenced pistol and a shotgun are available and can be aimed and fired from an over-the-shoulder third-person perspective, but ammo is limited. The game lacks the RPG-like elements of the main Dead Island games; there are no player levels, and weapon selection is non-customizable, with weapons being collected at fixed points in the game's story. As a journalist, the player character carries a camera that can be used to take pictures of significant objects in the game environment, causing the character to comment on them. The player character's deteriorating mental state plays a significant role in gameplay, with many unreal events occurring such as buildings falling from the sky, or the player abruptly transporting from one location to another when attempting to cross a room. The game uses a cel-shaded graphics style.

== Plot ==
2 days before the Banoi Island zombie outbreak, covert operative "Kilo Two" goes to Narepela to infiltrate GeoPharm and assassinate a mole attempting to expose them for creating the zombie virus. Kilo Two assassinates the mole and recovers the data, but the zombie outbreak prevents extraction. He hides the data and is killed by a massive creature.

6 months later, journalist Cliff Calo and his two friends, Linda Waterson and Devan Mavropani, arrive on Narapela to uncover the truth about the zombie outbreak. Cliff, the son of an influential broadcasting executive, resents his father for passing him up for a promotion in favor of his sister. Shortly after arriving, Linda is bitten by a zombie. Devan carries Linda to a camp on top of the island's central mountain, while Cliff investigates a plane crash they saw earlier. Cliff arrives at the crash site and meets the pilot, Xian Mei, who had come to the island in search of Kilo Two and the GeoPharm data. She tells Cliff that the secret GeoPharm facility may have a cure for the virus. While exploring the island, Cliff begins to experience hallucinations.

Cliff passes out from a hallucination and awakens back at the mobile camp. He witnesses Linda being carried away by the creature that attacked Kilo Two. Devan implores Cliff to flee the island, revealing that Cliff hallucinated his radio communications with Linda. After an intense argument, Devan goes off to find a boat to escape Narepela. Cliff follows the creature to the GeoPharm facility, where he finds the data Kilo Two hid. He discovers the creature is Dr. Aaron Welles, an infected GeoPharm scientist whose rare mutation allows him to retain his intelligence. Aaron and another scientist, Faith Kimball, test a cure on Linda, which ultimately fails and kills her. Enraged, Cliff attacks Aaron but is forced to flee.

As Cliff continues to lose his sanity, Xian Mei tells him that she has planted explosions all over the island and will detonate them to stop the outbreak. She warns him to leave, but Cliff insists on staying to find and rescue Devan. Cliff's father contacts him to ask for the data drive so he can broadcast the truth to the world. However, Cliff refuses to, believing his father will take the credit. Dr. Kimball tells Cliff that she has Devan, telling him to meet her at the office of GeoPharm's founder, Emery Crown.

At the office, Kimball tells Cliff that she has the cure for the virus but must test it on Cliff. She releases Devan, already a zombie, who bites Cliff before collapsing. Cliff passes out and experiences a psychotic break from reality. After hallucinating alternate experiences of previous events, Cliff kneels next to Devan and apologizes before injecting one of them with the serum. Afterward, Cliff ends up on a beach of Narapela. He releases a case containing the data drive and his own narrated account of events into the ocean before Linda's voice calls him back to the island.

In a post-credits scene, the case passes by the boat Cliff, Linda, and Devan arrive on in the beginning.

== Reception ==
Reception

Aggregate score
Aggregator	Score
Metacritic	PC: 52/100; PS3: 40/100; X360: 32/100

Review scores
Publication	Score
Electronic Gaming Monthly	7.5/10
Eurogamer	2/10
Game Informer	2/10
GameSpot	5/10
GameTrailers	3/10
Hardcore Gamer	1/5
IGN	6.8/10
Polygon	2/10

Escape Dead Island received mixed to negative reviews from critics upon release. Review aggregator Metacritic gave the Microsoft Windows version 52/100 based on 23 reviews, the PlayStation 3 version 40/100 based on 25 reviews, and the Xbox 360 version 32/100 based on 12 reviews.

Eric L. Patterson from Electronic Gaming Monthly gave the game a 7.5/10, praising the comic-book-style visuals, unique graphical styles, refreshing ideas, as well as the third-person perspective. He stated that "I want more games like Escape Dead Island—games that don't have to be perfect or gigantic blockbusters and can just be fun experiences that understand what their place in the world should be."

Scott Butterworth from IGN gave the game a 6.8/10, stating that "While Escape Dead Island's workmanlike combat and ho-hum zombies fail to fully capitalize on this unoriginal but respectably executed premise, it does manage to punctuate its enjoyable filler with some genuinely spectacular moments of madness."

James Kozanitis from Hardcore Gamer gave the game a 1/5, saying, "Escape Dead Island squandered whatever opportunity it had to make a compelling story, while offering only sub-par gameplay to tide you over in the meantime. It has no business being a game, rather than a one-shot graphic novel for dedicated fans."

Tim Turi of Game Informer gave the game a 2/10, criticizing the frustrating mission structure, poor textures, combat system and animations, the lack of variety in terms of enemy type, unlikable characters and low replay value. He stated that "Escape Dead Island's single-player adventure is plagued with enough technical and design horrors that every copy of the game should be sealed shut and stamped with enough biohazard symbols to keep innocent fans of the series away."

Justin McElroy from Polygon declared it "the worst game I've ever finished", calling it a failure in its attempts at stealth, survival horror and action.
