= Yager =

2003 video game

- Developer: Yager Development
- Publishers: EU: THQ; NA: Kemco (Xbox); NA: DreamCatcher Interactive (PC)
- Designers: Uwe Beneke; Mathias Wiese
- Platforms: Xbox, Microsoft Windows
- Release: Xbox: EU: 23 May 2003; NA: 28 September 2004; Microsoft Windows: EU: 3 October 2003; NA: 4 February 2005
- Genre: Air combat simulation

Yager is a combat flight simulation video game developed by Yager Development and published by THQ, Kemco, and DreamCatcher Interactive. It was first released as an Xbox exclusive before later being ported to Microsoft Windows, both in 2003. The Xbox version was released in North America in later 2004, while the PC version was released in North America as Aerial Strike: Low Altitude - High Stakes: The Yager Missions in February 2005. In this game, gamers take on the role of Magnus Tide, a freelance pilot adventurer. Yager and Aerial Strike is set over 20 levels in which the player takes possession of various weapons and ships in an effort to accomplish each mission. The game, while well-received critically, was not a commercial success, largely in part due to a delayed North American release amidst a lack of advertising.

== Gameplay ==
Yager is set in a futuristic world where countries' borders no longer exist and the earth is controlled by a number of megacorporations, most notably DST, as well as Proteus and Lobos Robotics. Although the old countries officially do not exist there are tell tale signs identifying each environment.

The Proteus Islands are a tropical paradise and the headquarters of the Proteus Corporation. The Free Trade Zone, a landscape dotted with turbines and palm trees, is the only zone not controlled by any corporation. The DST zone and surrounding fjords are connected to the Free Trade Zone by a system of caves, rivers, and deltas that run deep into DST territory. Bitterfeld is a desolate area littered with disused industrial buildings, crashed ships, abandoned machinery and other debris left behind by the old Progress Company.

== Plot ==
At the end of the 21st century, the world is almost exclusively ruled by megacorporations. Nevertheless, a few so-called free trade zones have formed, independent of corporate rule, inhabited primarily by fishermen, traders, mercenaries, and pirates. These areas can be dangerous for pilots whose aircraft have little or no onboard weaponry. the protagonist, Magnus Tide, is a former mercenary for the Proteus Corporation, is well aware of. One day, he was unable to complete an assigned mission and lost not only his aircraft but also all his money. His relationship with a Proteus employee also ended. Several years later, he returns to his former employer, Proteus, with a new type of aircraft, the Sagittarius. The Sagittarius's unique feature is that it not only possesses typical airplane flight characteristics but can also hover like a helicopter. Magnus Tide resumes working for Proteus as a lone fighter upon his return, arriving at just the right time, as Proteus is plagued by strange attacks.

== Reception ==
Reception

Aggregate score
Aggregator	Score	
Aggregator	PC	Xbox
Metacritic	62/100	70/100

Review scores
Publication	Score	
Publication	PC	Xbox
Computer Gaming World	2.5/5	N/A
Eurogamer	N/A	7/10
Game Informer	N/A	7/10
GameRevolution	N/A	C+
GameSpot	6.3/10	6.7/10
GameZone	6.8/10	N/A
IGN	6/10	7.9/10
Official Xbox Magazine (US)	N/A	5.1/10
PC Gamer (US)	75%	N/A
X-Play	N/A	3/5

Yager and Aerial Strike received "mixed or average reviews" according to the review aggregation website Metacritic.
