= E3 2014 =

20th annual Electronic Entertainment Expo

Electronic Entertainment Expo 2014
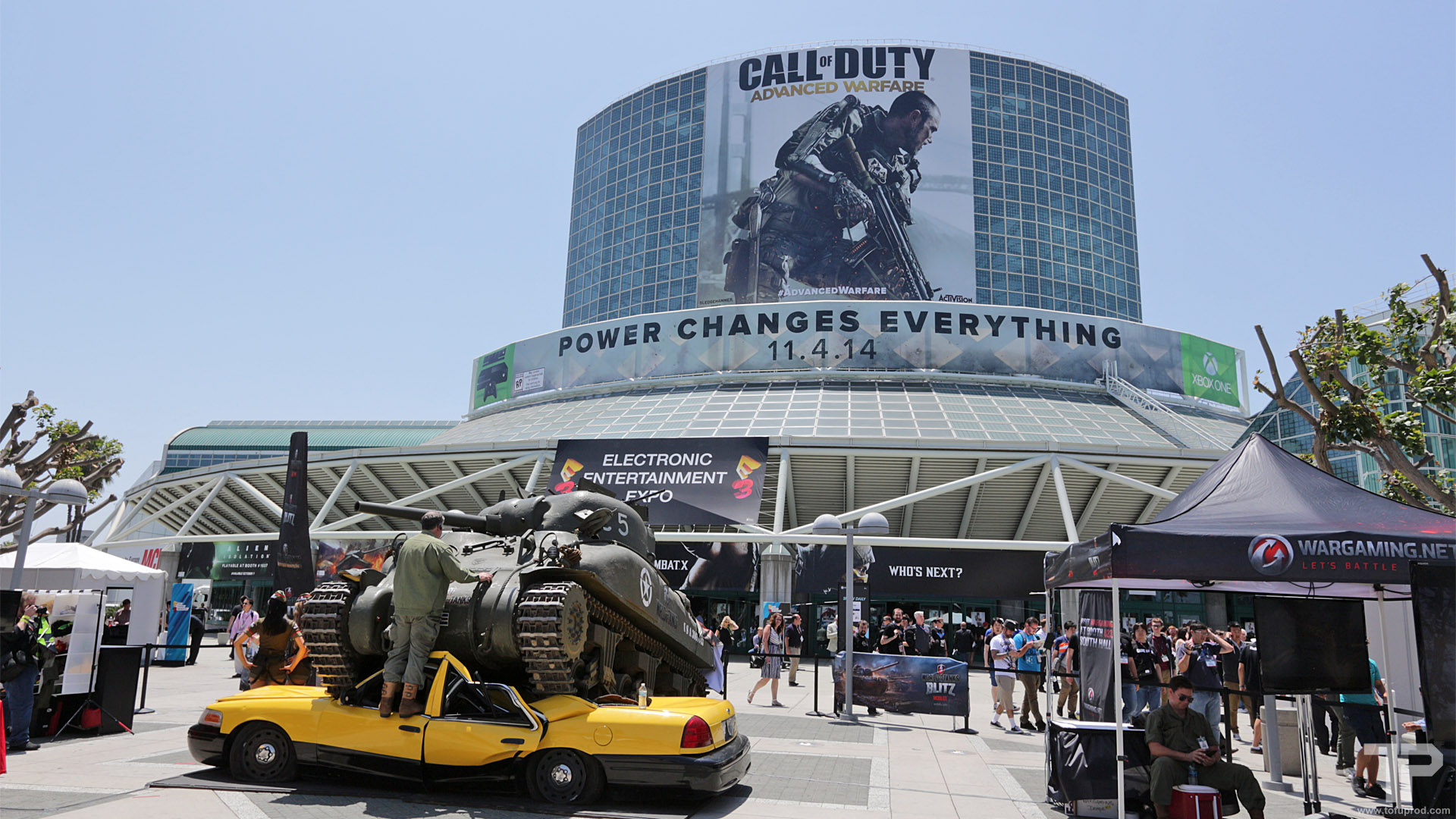
- Genre: Multi-genre
- Begins: June 10, 2014
- Ends: June 12, 2014
- Venue: Los Angeles Convention Center
- Locations: Los Angeles, California
- Country: United States
- Previous event: E3 2013
- Next event: E3 2015
- Attendance: 48,900
- Organizer: Entertainment Software Association
- Filing status: Non-profit

The Electronic Entertainment Expo 2014 (E3 2014) was the 20th E3 held. The event took place at the Los Angeles Convention Center in Los Angeles, California. It began on June 10, 2014, and ended on June 12, 2014, with 48,900 total attendees.

Major exhibitors included Microsoft Corporation, Nintendo, and Sony Computer Entertainment. Exhibitors host their own press conferences usually one day prior to the E3 event, but some companies issued additional information an extra day prior this time.

== Press conferences ==
=== Microsoft ===
Microsoft hosted a press conference on June 9 at 9:30 am. Trailers for Forza Horizon 2, Rise of the Tomb Raider, Evolve, Dragon Age: Inquisition, Sunset Overdrive, Project Spark, Ori and the Blind Forest, Halo 5: Guardians, Scalebound, a new character for Killer Instinct: Season 2, a Phantom Dust reboot and Crackdown 3 were revealed. There was also gameplay footage of Assassin's Creed Unity, Call of Duty Advanced Warfare, Sunset Overdrive, The Witcher 3: Wild Hunt and Tom Clancy's The Division. Halo: The Master Chief Collection, Scalebound and Dance Central Spotlight were announced as well.

=== Electronic Arts ===
Electronic Arts hosted a press conference on June 9 at 12:00 pm. Among the new titles shown were the role-playing game Dragon Age: Inquisition and Mass Effect 4, the action-adventure title Mirror's Edge: Catalyst and Star Wars: Battlefront, the first-person shooter Battlefield Hardline and the life simulation game The Sims 4. EA Sports announced a number of new releases, such as Madden NFL 15, NBA Live 15, FIFA 15, NHL 15 and EA Sports PGA Tour. Two untitled projects from Criterion Games and BioWare were also announced.

=== Ubisoft ===
Ubisoft hosted a press conference on June 9 at 3:00 pm. Upcoming action-adventure games included Tom Clancy's The Division, The Crew, Valiant Hearts: The Great War and the sequels Assassin's Creed Unity and Far Cry 4. Tom Clancy's Rainbow Six: Siege and Just Dance 2015 were also announced during the conference.

=== Sony ===
Sony hosted a press conference on June 9 at 6:00 pm. The new CEO of SCEA was officially introduced as Shawn Layden. An all-new white version of the PlayStation 4 was shown bundled with Destiny to be released at launch of the game. Announcement trailers were shown for PlayStation exclusives Bloodborne by FromSoftware, LittleBigPlanet 3 by Sumo Digital, and Uncharted 4: A Thief's End by Naughty Dog, among others. Trailers were also shown for Grand Theft Auto V, Dead Island 2, No Man's Sky, Destiny, Mortal Kombat X, Far Cry 4, Batman: Arkham Knight, Metal Gear Solid V: The Phantom Pain and others. Sony also announced an original TV series to be produced based on Powers.

=== Nintendo ===
Nintendo for a second consecutive E3 decided to forego hosting a traditional press conference in favor of a pre-recorded video presentation, billed the Nintendo Digital Event, which streamed online on June 10 at 9:00 am with an accompanying press release. Anchored by Nintendo of America COO Reggie Fils-Aimé and featuring stop motion sketches from the producers of Robot Chicken, the Digital Event primarily followed a documentary format with game footage and trailers accompanied by short interviews with developers. During this event, Nintendo showcased upcoming titles including Super Smash Bros. for Nintendo 3DS and Wii U, Yoshi's Woolly World, Bayonetta 2 from PlatinumGames, Koei Tecmo's Zelda spin-off Hyrule Warriors, and Xenoblade Chronicles X by Monolith Soft, among others. First time reveals included the next Legend of Zelda for Wii U, Mario Maker, Captain Toad: Treasure Tracker, Kirby and the Rainbow Curse, multiplayer shooter Splatoon and an early look at the newest Star Fox title for Wii U. The Digital Event also featured the debut of Nintendo's NFC platform, revealed as amiibo.

== List of notable exhibitors ==
This is a list of major video game exhibitors who made appearances at E3 2014.

- 2K
- 505
- Activision Blizzard
- Atlus
- Aksys Games
- Bandai Namco
- Bethesda
- Capcom
- CD Projekt Red
- Crytek
- Deep Silver
- Devolver Digital
- Disney
- Electronic Arts
- Epic
- Konami
- Microsoft
- Natsume Inc.
- Nintendo
- NIS
- Rockstar Games
- Sega
- Sony
- Square Enix
- Tecmo Koei
- Telltale
- Ubisoft
- Warner Bros.
- Xseed Games
- Zynga

== List of featured games ==
This is a list of notable titles that appeared at E3 2014.

2K: Borderlands: The Pre-Sequel! (PC / PS3 / Xbox 360); Civilization: Beyond Earth (PC); Evolve (PC / PS4 / Xbox One); NBA 2K15 (PC / PS3 / PS4 / Xbox 360 / Xbox One); WWE 2K15 (PS3 / PS4 / Xbox 360 / Xbox One); 505: Defense Grid 2 (PC / PS4 / Xbox One); Sniper Elite III (PC / PS3 / PS4 / Xbox 360 / Xbox One); Activision Blizzard: Call of Duty: Advanced Warfare (PC / PS3 / PS4 / Xbox 360 / Xbox One); Destiny (PS3 / PS4 / Xbox 360 / Xbox One); Skylanders: Trap Team (3DS / PS3 / PS4 / Wii / Wii U / Xbox 360 / Xbox One); Aksys Games: Guilty Gear Xrd (PS4, PS3); Atlus: Abyss Odyssey (PC / PS3 / Xbox 360); Citizens of Earth (3DS / PC / PS4 / Vita / Wii U); Persona 4 Arena Ultimax (PS3, 360); Persona 4: Dancing All Night (PS Vita); Persona Q: Shadow of the Labyrinth (3DS); Bandai Namco: Dragon Ball Xenoverse (PS3 / PS4 / Xbox 360 / Xbox One); Lords of the Fallen (PC / PS4 / Xbox One); Naruto Shippuden: Ultimate Ninja Storm Revolution (PC / PS3 / Xbox 360); Rise of Incarnates (PC); Sword Art Online: Hollow Fragment (Vita); Tales of Hearts R (Vita); Tales of Xillia 2 (PS3); Bethesda: BattleCry (PC); Doom (PC / PS4 / Xbox One); The Evil Within (PC / PS3 / PS4 / Xbox 360 / Xbox One); Capcom: Dead Rising 3 (PC); Deep Down (PS4); Monster Hunter 4 Ultimate (3DS); Phoenix Wright: Ace Attorney Trilogy (3DS); Professor Layton vs. Phoenix Wright: Ace Attorney (3DS); Ultra Street Fighter IV (PC / PS3 / Xbox 360); Crytek: Arena of Fate (PC); Hunt: Horrors of the Gilded Age (PC / PS4 / Xbox One); Deep Silver: Dead Island 2 (PC / PS4 / Xbox One); Homefront: The Revolution (PC / PS4 / Xbox One); Metro: Redux (PC / PS4 / Xbox One); Devolver Digital: Broforce (PC); Hotline Miami 2: Wrong Number (PC); Not a Hero (PC); Disney: Disney Infinity 2.0: Marvel Super Heroes (PC / PS3 / PS4 / Wii U / Xbox 360 / Xbox One); Fantasia: Music Evolved (Xbox 360 / Xbox One)	Electronic Arts: Battlefield Hardline (PC / PS3 / PS4 / Xbox 360 / Xbox One); Dragon Age: Inquisition (PC / PS3 / PS4 / Xbox 360 / Xbox One); EA Sports PGA Tour (TBA); EA Sports UFC (PS4 / Xbox One); FIFA 15 (3DS / PC / PS3 / PS4 / PS Vita / Wii / Xbox 360 / Xbox One); Madden NFL 15 (PS3 / PS4 / Xbox 360 / Xbox One); Mass Effect 4 (TBD); Mirror's Edge: Catalyst (PC / PS4 / Xbox One); NHL 15 (PS3 / PS4 / Xbox 360 / Xbox One); The Sims 4 (PC); Star Wars Battlefront (PC / PS4 / Xbox One); Focus Home Interactive: Sherlock Holmes: Crimes & Punishments (PC / PS3 / PS4 / Xbox 360 / Xbox One); Styx: Master of Shadows (PC / PS4 / Xbox One); Kojima Productions: Metal Gear Solid V: The Phantom Pain (PC / PS3 / PS4 / Xbox 360 / Xbox One); Microsoft: Below (PC / Xbox One); Crackdown 3 (Xbox One); D4 (Xbox One); Fable Legends (Xbox One); Forza Horizon 2 (Xbox 360 / Xbox One); Halo 5: Guardians (Xbox One); Halo: The Master Chief Collection (Xbox One); Inside (Xbox One); Killer Instinct: Season 2 (Xbox One); Ori and the Blind Forest (Xbox One / PC); Phantom Dust (Xbox One); Project Spark (PC / Xbox 360 / Xbox One); Quantum Break (Xbox One); Scalebound (Xbox One); Sunset Overdrive (Xbox One); Natsume Inc.: Alphadia Genesis (Wii U); A-Train: City Simulator (3DS); End of Serenity (PSP); Harvest Moon: The Lost Valley (3DS); Reel Fishing: Master's Challenge (PS Vita); Nintendo: Art Academy (Wii U); Bayonetta 2 (Wii U); Captain Toad: Treasure Tracker (Wii U); Code Name: S.T.E.A.M. (3DS); Devil's Third (Wii U); Fossil Fighters: Frontier (3DS); Hyrule Warriors (Wii U); Kirby and the Rainbow Curse (Wii U); The Legend of Zelda (Wii U); Mario Maker (Wii U); Mario Party 10 (Wii U); Mario vs. Donkey Kong: Tipping Stars (Wii U); Pokémon Omega Ruby and Alpha Sapphire (3DS); Pushmo World (Wii U); Splatoon (Wii U); Star Fox (Wii U); Super Smash Bros. for Nintendo 3DS and Wii U (3DS / Wii U); Xenoblade Chronicles X (Wii U); Yoshi's Woolly World (Wii U); NIS: Danganronpa 2: Goodbye Despair (Vita); Disgaea 4: A Promise Revisited (Vita); Fairy Fencer F (PS3); Natural Doctrine (PS3 / PS4 / PS Vita)	Rockstar Games: Grand Theft Auto V (PC / PS4 / Xbox One); Sega: Alien: Isolation (PC / PS3 / PS4 / Xbox 360 / Xbox One); Hatsune Miku: Project DIVA F 2nd (PS3 / Vita); Sonic Boom (3DS / Wii U); Sony: Abzû (PS4 / PSVita); Big Fest (PSVita); The Binding of Isaac: Rebirth (PC / PS3 / PS4 / PS Vita); Bloodborne (PS4); Driveclub (PS4); Entwined (PS3 / PS4 / PS Vita); Freedom Wars (PS Vita); Grim Fandango Remastered (PS4 / PS Vita); H1Z1: Just Survive (PC / PS4); Helldivers (PS3 / PS4 / PS Vita); Hohokum (PS3 / PS4 / PS Vita); Infamous First Light (PS4); Kingdom Under Fire II (PC / PS4); The Last of Us Remastered (PS4); Let It Die (PS4); LittleBigPlanet 3 (PS3 / PS4); No Man's Sky (PS4); The Order: 1886 (PS4); Ratchet & Clank Reboot (PS4); Rime (PS4); Uncharted 4: A Thief's End (PS4); Square Enix: Final Fantasy XIV: A Realm Reborn (PC / PS3 / PS4); Hitman: Sniper (iOS / Android); Kingdom Hearts HD 2.5 Remix (PS3); Lara Croft and the Temple of Osiris (PC / PS4 / Xbox One); Murdered: Soul Suspect (PC / PS3 / PS4 / Xbox One); Nosgoth (PC); Rise of the Tomb Raider (Xbox 360 / Xbox One); Theatrhythm Final Fantasy: Curtain Call (3DS); Telltale: Tales from the Borderlands (PC / PS3 / PS4 / PS Vita / Xbox 360 / Xbox One); Ubisoft: Assassin's Creed Unity (PC / PS4 / Xbox One); The Crew (PC / PS4 / Xbox One); Far Cry 4 (PC / PS3 / PS4 / Xbox 360 / Xbox One); Just Dance 2015 (PS3 / PS4 / Wii / Wii U / Xbox 360 / Xbox One); Shape Up (Xbox One); Tom Clancy's Rainbow Six: Siege (PC / PS4 / Xbox One); Tom Clancy's The Division (PC / PS4 / Xbox One); Valiant Hearts: The Great War (PC / PS3 / PS4 / Xbox 360 / Xbox One); Warner Bros.: Batman: Arkham Knight (PC / PS4 / Xbox One); Dying Light (PC / PS3 / PS4 / Xbox 360 / Xbox One); Lego Batman 3: Beyond Gotham (3DS / PC / PS3 / PS4 / Vita / Xbox 360 / Xbox One / Wii U); Middle-earth: Shadow of Mordor (PC / PS3 / PS4 / Xbox 360 / Xbox One); Mortal Kombat X (PC / PS3 / PS4 / Xbox 360 / Xbox One); The Witcher 3: Wild Hunt (PC / PS4 / Xbox One); Xseed Games: Akiba's Trip: Undead & Undressed (PS3 / Vita); Brandish: The Dark Revenant (PSP); Corpse Party (PC); Senran Kagura Bon Appétit! (Vita); Senran Kagura Shinovi Versus (Vita); Story of Seasons (3DS)
