= Homefront: The Revolution =

2016 video game

- Developers: Dambuster Studios; Crytek
- Publisher: Deep Silver: JP: Spike Chunsoft
- Director: Hasit Zala
- Producer: David Stenton
- Designers: Adam Duckett; Sam Howels
- Programmer: James Chilvers
- Artist: Rachele Doimo
- Writers: Alex Hood; Hasit Zala
- Composers: Ross Tregenza; Winifred Phillips
- Series: Homefront
- Engine: CryEngine
- Platforms: Microsoft Windows; PlayStation 4 Xbox One
- Release: NA: 17 May 2016; EU: 20 May 2016
- Genre: First-person shooter
- Modes: Single-player, multiplayer

Homefront: The Revolution is a first-person shooter video game developed by Dambuster Studios. The game was published by Deep Silver for Microsoft Windows, PlayStation 4 and Xbox One in May 2016. It is a re-imagining of the premise of Homefront. Homefront: The Revolution takes place in 2029 in an alternate timeline, following the protagonist Ethan Brady as he joins a resistance movement against the army of a North Korean occupation in the city of Philadelphia.

Homefront: The Revolution received mixed reviews upon release, with critics mostly praising the open world and weapon customization system, while criticizing the narrative, characters, and gunplay, as well as the technical issues for hampering the overall experience.

== Gameplay ==
Homefront: The Revolution is a first-person shooter game set in an open world environment with many districts to explore. The player can scavenge for supplies to modify weapons and equipment. The Korean People's Army (KPA) weapons are all fingerprint-locked and as such they have a sizeable advantage over the resistance. There are side missions where the player will be called off to carry out tasks like assassinating a high-ranking KPA general or steal a KPA drone. Another new feature introduced is the enhanced ability to modify weapons such as adding a fore-grip or a sight in the middle of a firefight or to convert a rifle to a Light Machine Gun and vice versa.

Philadelphia is split into three districts: The Green Zone is the affluent area where at the center of the city the KPA is at its strongest, they are also where the invaders are at their most comfortable: they have running water, a stable power supply, and their fortifications make green zones one of the safest places in the city. The second district is the Yellow Zone, which is the ghetto area where most of the population live. Patrols happen frequently and it is very difficult for the rebels to navigate. The cluttered city streets are awash with patrols, scanner drones, and ever-watching cameras. Power and water are intermittent and overpopulation has forced people into slum-like tent cities. The Red Zone is the bombed-out suburban area of Philadelphia that is full of ruins and rubble; it is also where the resistance is at its strongest. While the KPA presence is still heavy, players will run into resistance troops, weapon caches, and traps set up to take out enemy patrols. The landscape is barren, though. Heavy shelling and frequent street battles have left most of the buildings in rubble and there is a constant haze of brick dust. It is the Forbidden Zone, so if the KPA catch anyone out there, they will shoot on sight — and call in back-up.

Unlike the first Homefront, which features a competitive multiplayer mode, The Revolution features a four-player cooperative multiplayer mode. This mode, known as the "Resistance" mode, is separated from the main campaign and has its own characters, progression, classes and perks.

== Plot ==
=== Setting and backstory ===
Homefront: The Revolution is not a continuation of the original Homefront, but rather a re-imagining of the premise. The story takes place in an alternate history setting in which the digital revolution of the 1970s took place in North Korea's "Silicon River" (Ryesong River) rather than the "Silicon Valley" of Northern California. In 1977, North Korea's communist government falls out of favor after a series of devastating floods and Kim Il Sung resigns from office and is replaced with a more moderate Premier, Lee Dong-won. As a result, the now capitalist nation of North Korea has become the most powerful and influential nation on Earth, controlled by the APEX Corporation and led by a Steve Jobs-like figure named Joe Tae-Se. The United States, meanwhile, after years of multiple conflicts in the Middle East under Presidents George W. Bush and John McCain, is a pariah state amongst the international community as well as suffering from massive war debt from purchasing weapons technology from APEX and is in severe economic conditions. In 2025, the United States' economy collapses, forcing the US to default on their debt to North Korea. Joe Tae-Se's son, APEX CEO and North Korean Premier John Tae-Se, with the approval of the international community, uses this as a pretext to invade and occupy the country, using a backdoor installed in all APEX technology to shut down the United States military. Although initially presented as an international humanitarian effort to restore stability to the United States after the economic collapse, the Koreans proceed to strip mine the country for its natural resources to repay the debt, and brutalize the populace in response to a national resistance movement against the occupation. The game takes place in Philadelphia in 2029, four years into the occupation. The new Philadelphia is a heavily policed and oppressed environment, with civilians living in fear as the Korean People's Army patrol multiple districts in the city, aided by American collaborators led by Mayor Simpson.

=== Story ===
The game follows Ethan Brady, a new Resistance member whose cell is expecting a visit from Benjamin Walker, "The Voice of Freedom" and leader of the national resistance against the KPA occupation. Brady's cell is attacked in a KPA raid, and every member of the cell except for Brady are tortured to death by the KPA. Walker arrives, saving Brady and killing the KPA, but is wounded in the fight. Brady leaves to make contact with another Resistance cell, but while he's gone the KPA raid Walker's safehouse and capture him. Brady attempts to rendezvous with the new cell, but is mistaken for a Korean spy, beaten unconscious, and nearly tortured by the Resistance, being saved at the last moment when his identity is established. Brady joins the new Resistance cell led by Jack Parrish, whose field commander is volatile, ruthless former criminal Dana Moore. Two other key figures in the cell are Dr. Sam Burnett, a pacifist medical doctor who believes in nonviolent resistance but works with the Resistance anyway in order to treat the victims of the KPA's brutality, and James Crawford, a Resistance spy operating within the KPA ranks as an American collaborator. The Resistance's primary focus is finding Ben Walker and rescuing him.

Brady is sent to work for Ned Sharpe, the Resistance's armorer. However, the armory is raided by KPA forces, during which Ned is killed and the Resistance's weapons stockpile destroyed by a Goliath robot. Brady succeeds in destroying the Goliath and stealing its robot brain, and Parrish comes up with a plan to reprogram the brain and use it to take control of a Goliath, with which the Resistance can break into Independence Hall where Walker is being put on trial by the KPA. Resistance technician Heather Cortez successfully reprograms the robot brain, while Parrish and Brady steal a Goliath from the KPA. However, the Goliath is sabotaged by a mole within the Resistance, ruining the plan to break into Independence Hall.

Crawford comes up with an alternate plan, in which he will pretend to capture Brady so he will be taken inside Independence Hall for the trial, at which point Brady can break free with Crawford's help and disable the Hall's defenses from inside. The plan seems to work, and the Resistance storms into Independence Hall, only to discover there is no trial occurring and the courtroom is actually a sealed trap. Mayor Simpson appears on a video projector to show that Crawford has betrayed the Resistance, and also that the KPA have mentally broken Ben Walker, who gives a national speech calling for the Resistance to surrender. The Resistance manages to escape the trap thanks to Heather storming the Hall with the repaired Goliath, but in the resulting fight Heather is killed and the Goliath is destroyed. The KPA proceeds to launch retaliatory strikes against all Resistance outposts in Philadelphia, resulting in the Resistance's near collapse.

Although initially heavily demoralized, Parrish and Moore come up with a final last-ditch plan to storm City Hall and capture Mayor Simpson so he can be forced to read a message denouncing the KPA occupation on national TV, just like Walker was forced to denounce the Resistance. Moore sends Brady to release the criminals and killers from the KPA's prison zone to help provide the firepower needed to storm City Hall. The attack on City Hall succeeds, however Mayor Simpson refuses to read the message given to him, stating that the KPA will kill everyone in Philadelphia with nerve gas if they feel they are losing control of the city, claiming that they have secretly already done so with Boston and Pittsburgh. Moore loses control and executes Simpson on live TV in retaliation for Simpson's sexual abuse of her while she was his prisoner. In desperation, Parrish gives a speech urging the American people to rise up against the KPA. Despite lacking Ben Walker's eloquence, Parrish's heartfelt speech succeeds in spurring the people of Philadelphia to rebel.

Parrish, Moore, and Brady celebrate their success, but are interrupted by a disgusted Dr. Burnett, who informs them that the KPA are gassing the city, just as Mayor Simpson warned would happen. Feeling that violence has only provoked mass murder, Burnett abandons the Resistance and goes to try to help evacuate the city. Parrish, Moore, and Brady attempt to use the Resistance's captured Surface-to-Air missile launchers to shoot down the airships deploying the nerve gas, only to find that the airships are protected by a swarm of automated drones. Parrish and Brady go to confront Crawford, hoping he knows how to shut down the drone defenses. A frightened Crawford claims the KPA discovered his status as a double agent under the control of "The judge" and forced him to betray the Resistance, and tells Parrish how to shut down the drones in exchange for protection. A disgusted Parrish instead abandons Crawford, leaving it up to Brady to decide whether to spare the traitor or execute him.

With only a few minutes left until the airships gas the city, Parrish, Moore, and Brady storm Independence Hall where the drone control station is located, only to be stopped by a Goliath. Parrish is shot several times, while Moore grabs an explosive pack and sacrifices herself in order to suicide bomb the Goliath and destroy it. An injured Brady makes a final push to the drone control station, but is overpowered and nearly choked unconscious by a KPA officer before he can deactivate the drones. However, Parrish overcomes his injuries long enough to arrive to kill the KPA officer and save Brady, who sends the signal to shut down the drones. This allows the Resistance to shoot down the KPA airships before they can gas most of the city. Brady helps support the wounded Parrish as the two of them walk outside to watch the airships being shot down, with Parrish declaring that the revolution has begun.

=== DLC ===
The game's storyline is continued in its 3 DLC campaigns, The Voice of Freedom, Aftermath, and Beyond the Walls. The Voice of Freedom is a prelude to the main game, showing Ben Walker's infiltration into Philadelphia, during which he fights through KPA forces as well a local gang of criminals, eventually arriving at the safehouse to save Ethan Brady from the KPA.

In Aftermath, which takes place after the end of the main game, Ethan Brady is sent by Jack Parrish to assassinate Ben Walker in order to stop the demoralizing effect of his pro-KPA propaganda broadcasts. Brady decides to try and rescue Walker instead, still feeling indebted to Walker for saving his life. Brady discovers that Walker only cooperated with the KPA after weeks of torture and the KPA executing civilians whenever he refused to obey them. Upon learning this, Parrish decides that Brady is correct in wanting to rescue Walker instead of killing him. Brady manages to break into the KPA prison facility where Walker is being held, and the two of them fight their way out of the prison and escape in a KPA helicopter being piloted by Cook, the Resistance's gunsmith.

In the game's final DLC, Beyond the Walls, after weeks of fighting, the national Resistance movement has ultimately been crushed by the KPA, with the Philadelphia Resistance being the last Resistance cell remaining. Parrish and Brady receive a garbled transmission from a NATO agent moments before the KPA launches a final assault on their headquarters, forcing the remains of the Resistance to flee in disarray. Brady goes into the countryside to meet the NATO agent, who turns out to be Lisa Burnel, a British engineer who tells him that NATO is planning a full-scale assault against the KPA in America in response to the KPA's invasion of Europe. Burnel's mission is to launch a nuclear warhead into space from a nearby decommissioned missile silo so the EMP blast will take out the KPA's APEX satellite network, in order to reduce the KPA's combat efficiency. Brady accompanies Burnel to the silo, and with assistance from the remains of the Resistance manages to hold off a KPA assault long enough for Burnel to prepare and launch the missile. However, a malfunction causes the silo launch doors to jam, forcing Brady to jump into the launch shaft to open them manually. This traps Brady inside the launch shaft, and he tells Burnel to launch the missile anyway even though the ignition blast will kill him. Burnel is initially reluctant to do so, but after KPA soldiers break into the control room and shoot her, she hits the launch button before dying. The KPA soldiers attempt to stop the launch but to no avail. Brady is incinerated by the missile's ignition, and the missile successfully destroys the APEX network, disabling KPA's entire communication, weapon integration and surveillance network. With KPA's military weakened, NATO force begin their campaign against KPA force. Parrish gives a final speech telling the people of America that they at last have a real chance at freedom and to rise up and fight alongside NATO to liberate the nation.

== Development and release ==
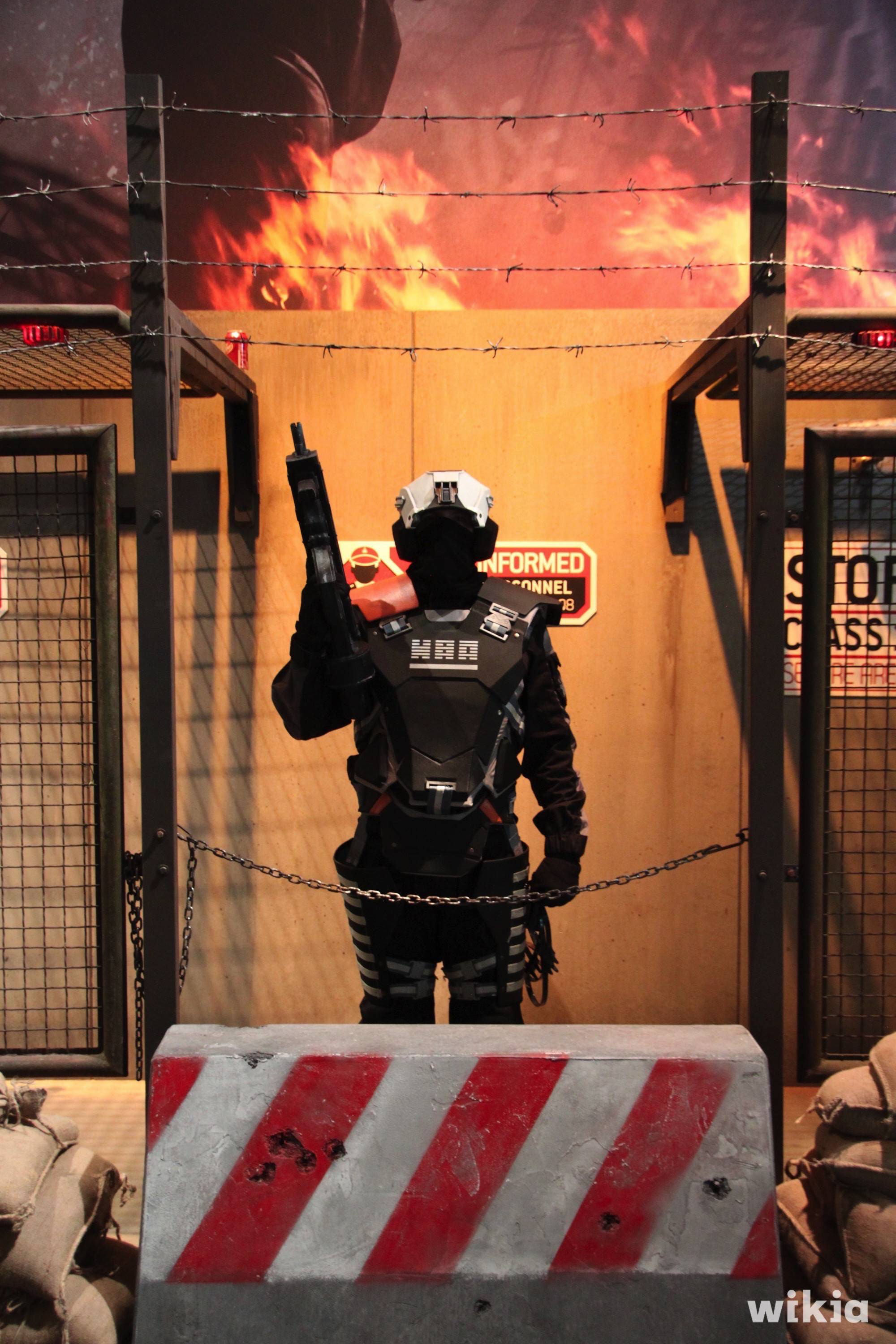
Promotion at Gamescom 2015

Despite the mixed reviews received by Homefront, THQ confirmed that a sequel to Homefront was in development. The developer of the previous installment, Kaos Studios, was closed by THQ in June 2011 as part of a corporate re-organization; while THQ originally stated that future work on the franchise would be assumed by THQ's Montreal studio, it was later announced that the game would be developed by Crytek UK instead. The fate of the game was left unclear, however, after THQ filed for Chapter 11 bankruptcy in December 2012. THQ would, in January 2013, begin the process of selling its assets and intellectual properties at auction. Crytek would acquire the rights to the franchise for US$544,218. Along with its official title, Homefront: The Revolution, and a projected release in 2015, it was also announced at E3 2014 that Deep Silver (who had also acquired properties from THQ in the bankruptcy auction) would co-publish the game with Crytek.

Crytek designer Fasahat Salim commented that "when Crytek acquired the IP, all of a sudden we had the freedom to take this game wherever we wanted"; under the auspices of THQ, the game was designed with a linear format. Under Crytek's involvement, the game was changed to use an open world structure. The Revolution is set in Philadelphia; Salim noted the city is a more recognizable and relatable location than the small, Western city of Montrose, Colorado used as the setting of Homefront, but that players will still be able to tell that something is not right, giving it an "alien" feeling. Actions taken by the player between missions (such as disrupting the acts of the KPA and/or killing its members) will increase the prominence of resistance activities in the city, which can be used to distract enemies. Events will occur across the city throughout the game, concurrently with story missions; Salim explained that "if you're in the middle of a mission and all of a sudden you find yourself in a heated skirmish between the resistance and the KPA, that's just ... happening. You can join that if you want to, or you can use that to your advantage."

Development of the game was affected by financial issues at Crytek; in June 2014, reports surfaced that the company had missed wage payments and withheld bonuses for Crytek UK staff members, and that as a result, a number of employees had filed grievances and refused to report to work, and a number of employees—including Homefront director Hasit Zala, had left the company entirely. After denying that there were issues, Crytek later admitted on 25 July 2014 that it was in a "transitional phase" as it secured capital for future projects, with a particular focus on online gaming.

On 30 July 2014, Crytek announced that due to an internal restructuring, it would sell the Homefront intellectual property to Koch Media, parent company of Deep Silver. Development duties for Homefront: The Revolution were assumed by the newly formed Dambuster Studios in Nottingham; to comply with British business transfer law, all Crytek UK employees were transferred to this new subsidiary. On the acquisition, Koch Media's CEO Klemens Kundratitz stated that the company "strongly [believes] in the potential of Homefront: The Revolution and trust in the new team to continue the path they have been walking in the last years." Hasit Zala was also brought on to lead the studio.

On 12 March 2015, Deep Silver announced that Homefront: The Revolution had been delayed into 2016, to ensure that the development staff would have "every opportunity to turn [it] into a best-selling title." At Gamescom 2015, the game's multiplayer beta was announced. It would be released for the Xbox One in late 2015. A closed beta for the game was set to be released for the Xbox One in February 2016.

The game was supported by downloadable content upon launch. Dambuster Studios said they would release mission packs for the cooperative multiplayer, with the first set of missions to be released a month after the game's launch. The development team have planned to release three expansion packs, the first titled The Voice of Freedom and was released in September 2016, and the second being Aftermath, released in early November 2016. The final DLC titled Beyond The Walls was released in early 2017. A trial version of the game, which allowed players to play the first hour of the campaign and also granting unlimited access to Resistance mode, was released in March 2017, alongside the "Beyond the Walls" expansion.

After release, Easter eggs at various in-game arcade cabinets were found to let the player play through two levels of TimeSplitters 2, a 2002 game developed by Free Radical Design which eventually became owned by Deep Silver after the closure of Crytek UK. Later, in 2021, programmer Matt Phillips revealed he had included the whole of TimeSplitters 2 at a 4k resolution within Homefront, though had misplaced the required code to activate it. Shortly after announcing this, a previous associate was able to provide the required code.

== Reception ==
Reception

Aggregate score
Aggregator	Score
Metacritic	PC: 54/100; PS4: 48/100; XONE: 49/100

Review scores
Publication	Score
Electronic Gaming Monthly	4/10
Game Informer	4/10
GameRevolution	2/5
GameSpot	5/10
IGN	5/10
Polygon	6/10
VideoGamer.com	6/10

Edit on Wikidata

According to the review aggregator website Metacritic, the Microsoft Windows version of Homefront: The Revolution received "mixed or average" reviews, while the PlayStation 4 and Xbox One versions received "generally unfavorable" reviews from critics.

Nick Plessas for Electronic Gaming Monthly felt that the game had the potential to be good but thought it was greatly hindered by technical issues, writing: "I see a scenario in which I could've enjoy this experience—especially the combat—but the flaws that hampered it at every turn make it hard to recommend Homefront: The Revolution. If you can force yourself to sit down and claw your way through—professional incentive was my personal motivator—the goal the developers sought can be understood. It's just a shame that those goals are far too weighted down by technical issues and a lackluster narrative. Claims that there are patches right around the corner could give the game the adjustment it needs to be playable, but it is simply not worth the commitment of time or money as it is now."

In his review for Game Informer, Jeff Marchiafava expressed similar thoughts to Plessas's, criticizing the game for squandering great potential with technical shortcomings. More specifically, Marchiafava criticized the frame rate, voice acting, and gunplay, saying that the game's "few smart concepts are crushed under the weight of constant glitches and other problems". Jeb Haught of Game Revolution praised the weapon customization and level design, but criticized the "monotonous" gameplay, "inconsistent" frame rate, "awkward" gunplay, "forgettable" characters, and technical problems.

Scott Butterworth from GameSpot summarized his opinion with: "[The game's] substantial story campaign is impressively rich and its shooting can be tense and fun, but half-baked stealth, an unfulfilling story, and a vast menagerie of technical inadequacies drag the overall experience into disappointing mediocrity." Jon Ryan of IGN concluded his review with: "Though its world has some great aesthetic devices and a cool concept, ultimately all of Homefront: The Revolution's elements feel repetitive, unpolished, or downright unnecessary. Over the length of its campaign it fails to deliver a satisfying - or even fully functional - shooter experience." Ryan, like Haught, praised the weapon modification system and the world design.

Polygon's Russ Frushtick gave the game a less negative review. Unlike most other reviewers, Frushtick said he did not experience any technical issues, which he pinned down to him playing the PC version. He instead found fault in the game's lack of ambitions to be more than just a "check-the-boxes open-world shooter". Frushtick felt that this was the game's saddest aspect, especially since he liked the gunplay and thought it was capably developed, also writing: "there's never a moment that feels like it's reaching for something more".

Steven Burns of VideoGamer.com praised the "excellent" level design and great atmosphere, but also criticized the game's technical issues, so much so that he said he would "struggle to recommend the game to anyone at all" because of the problems. Burns also disliked the weapons and felt that the game ran out of steam midway through.

=== Sales ===
As of October 2017, the game has grossed €33 million. As of February 2018, it has sold 1.2 million copies.
