= Dreadnought (video game) =

2017 combat flight simulation video game

- Developer(s): Six Foot; Yager Development
- Publisher(s): Grey Box
- Engine: Unreal Engine 4
- Platform(s): PlayStation 4; Microsoft Windows
- Release: PlayStation 4; 5 December 2017; Microsoft Windows; 14 October 2018
- Genre(s): Combat flight simulation
- Mode(s): Multiplayer

Dreadnought was a combat flight simulation game developed by Six Foot and Yager Development, and published by Grey Box. Following a closed beta phase, the game was released for PlayStation 4 in December 2017, followed by a release for Microsoft Windows in October 2018.

On December 15, 2022, it was announced that the game would be put offline on March 19, 2023, at 11 am Central Standard Time. This was later extended to July 11 at 2PM CDT.

== Gameplay ==
The player is the captain of a large spacecraft and uses projectile weapons to attack. The player is able to choose between several classes of ships, each with drawbacks and advantages in categories like speed and size. The ships are massive and are intended to give the feel of being a commander, not a rogue bounty hunter. As a result, gameplay involves large amounts of strategy and positioning. In addition to positioning the ship and choosing targets, the player may also allocate power to various parts of the ship. These areas include shields, weapons and engines.

=== Multiplayer ===
In multiplayer, coordinated attacks and focus fire are important. Other players may choose to heal a damaged teammate. Matches last around ten minutes and players may switch ship classes after death depending on the match type.
