= Aim trainer =

Video game genre

Example of an aim trainer. The player is presented with a set of targets with the goal of clicking on them as fast as possible.

An aim trainer is a video game designed to improve the player's aiming skill in other games. It emulates a specific type of video game gameplay and virtual camera system, typically presenting the player with a set of targets to click and measuring the results.

Aim trainers rose to prominence in late 2010s and early 2020s, with notable trainers including 3D Aim Trainer, Aimlabs and Kovaak's. Custom levels in other games that function like aim trainers were also attempted. Aim trainers have shown a noticeable impact on player performance.

== Characteristics ==
Aim trainers are designed to help improve the player's aim at a specific video game or video game genre. This is particularly relevant in Esports, where winning teams receive prize money. Aim trainers most commonly emulate first-person shooter gameplay, though some may focus on third-person shooters and MOBAs. Presets for specific games are often featured to accurately emulate gunplay. The courses in aim trainers typically represent a shooting range, providing the player with various shooting targets to hit, some of which could be partially obscured or moving. The courses may focus on specific aiming skills, such as flicking, tracking or switching targets, as well as other important skills, such as strafing. Aim trainers track various player statistics to highlight the player's strengths and weaknesses.

Gameplay of osu!, a rhythm game often used as an aim trainer due to its emphasis on precision

Most aim trainers are freeware, though some cost money. Games that feature a level editor or similar modding tools may feature community-created maps that function like aim trainers. Certain games have built-in trainers, such as the practice range in Overwatch and Overwatch 2. Precision rhythm games such as osu! have also been used as aim trainers.

While aim trainers usually help professional players prepare for a competition in a specific video game, some aim trainers host their own competitions. These are often sponsored by the owners of the aim trainer; for example, the prizes in a 2022 competition inside 3D Aim Trainer featured gaming peripherals by SteelSeries, the owners of 3D Aim Trainer since 2022.

== History ==
Aim trainers surged in popularity in the late 2010s due to the growth of Esports. The most popular aim trainers, Aimlabs and 3D Aim Trainer, were released to the public in 2018 and 2019 respectively, though the former only left early access in 2023. The popularity of aim trainers increased significantly during the early 2020s, with 3D Aim Trainer going from 125,000 active users in 2020 to over 700,000 in October 2021. Due to the rise of mobile first-person shooters as well as the popularity of video game consoles, various aim trainers were ported to these devices.

== Effects ==
The impact of aim trainers on player skill has been subject to discussion. Daniyal Sultan Malik of eXputer concluded after 2400 hours of Kovaak's that aim trainers can enhance accuracy and reaction time; however, achieving noticeable improvements may require a significant time investment. Conversely, Emma Matthews of PC Gamer stated that she noticed improvements after only "a couple of hours".
