= Yager Development =

German video game developer

Yager Development GmbH
- Company type: Private
- Industry: Video games
- Founded: 1999; 26 years ago
- Founders: Uwe Beneke; Roman Golka; Philipp Schellbach; Timo Ullmann; Mathias Wiese
- Headquarters: Berlin, Germany
- Key people: Timo Ullmann (managing director)
- Number of employees: 130 (2024)
- Parent: Tencent (2021–present)
- Website: yager.de

Yager Development GmbH is a German video game developer based in Berlin.

== History ==
Yager Development GmbH was founded in 1999 by five friends from East Berlin: Timo Ullmann, Uwe Beneke, Roman Golka, Philipp Schellbach and Mathias Wiese. Ullmann and others had previously worked at the Babelsberg developer company Terra Tools, from which Yager and Radon Labs emerged.

The company developed five of its own games between 1999 and 2024, self-published two of them and worked on several co-development projects.

The studio's first work, Yager, released in 2003, was released in the USA in 2004 under the title Aerial Strike: Low Altitude - High Stakes. To more clearly represent a distinction between the first game's name and the studio's name, the company is officially spelled as YAGER (in capital letters) and the 2003 game as Yager. About nine years later, in June 2012, Spec Ops: The Line, the second title developed by Yager Development, was released. The game was internationally praised in particular for its sophisticated plot and staging, which repeatedly presents the player with morally critical decisions. At the German Developer Awards 2012, Spec Ops: The Line won the most prizes with five awards, namely in the jury category as "Best Action Game" and in the academy categories "Best German Game", "Best Storyline", "Best Graphics" and "Best Console Game". At the same time, Yager Development was named "Best Studio" in Germany and Spec Ops: The Line won numerous international awards.

At E3 2014 in Los Angeles, it was announced that Yager had taken over the development of Dead Island 2 instead of Techland, but publisher and rights holder Deep Silver withdrew responsibility from the development studio in July 2015. The reason given was differences in the view of the game. Furthermore, Yager's collaboration with Six Foot on the development of Dreadnought was announced at E3 2014. The game was released for the PlayStation 4 in June 2017 and for PC in October 2018 while the publishing was taken over by Grey Box. For Dreadnought, Yager received the German Developer Prize 2017 in the "Best Technical Achievement" category.

In 2019, Yager announced the release of the PvPvE FPS The Cycle into Early Access during Gamescom 2019 Opening Night Live. This was the first game in the studio's history developed and published by Yager and was initially only available on the PC via the Epic Games Store. The game ran for three seasons but underwent a pivot in 2021 from the original PvPvE looter shooter approach to an FPS extraction shooter. In June 2022, the title was officially released as The Cycle: Frontier on Steam and EGS.

In 2020, the Chinese online company Tencent acquired a minority stake in Yager. Tencent wants to help the studio expand its development and publishing activities. Regardless of Tencent's participation, Yager continues to run the studio independently and develop its own games. In June 2021, Tencent acquired a majority stake in the studio. In January 2024, Yager carried out a significant rebranding of the studio, announcing not only a new logo, website, and corporate identity, but also a completely new communication strategy. As part of this communication, Yager's past and current co-development projects with other studios were also announced, including with Funcom on Dune: Awakening and with Sharkmob on Exoborne.

Yager currently employs around 130 people at its headquarters in Berlin-Kreuzberg, making it one of the largest game developers in Germany.

== Developed games ==
Release year	Title	Genre	Publisher(s)	Platform(s)
2003	Yager	Combat flight simulation	THQ	Microsoft Windows, Xbox
2004	Aerial Strike: Low Altitude - High Stakes	Combat flight simulation	DreamCatcher Interactive, Kemco	Microsoft Windows, Xbox
2012	Spec Ops: The Line	Third-person shooter	2K Games	Linux, macOS, Microsoft Windows, PlayStation 3, Xbox 360
2017	Dreadnought	Combat flight simulation	Grey Box	Microsoft Windows, PlayStation 4
2019	The Cycle	FPS looter shooter	Yager Development	Microsoft Windows (EGS)
2022	The Cycle: Frontier	FPS extraction shooter	Yager Development	Microsoft Windows (EGS / Steam)

== Co-developed games ==
Development year	Title	Genre	Publisher	Release year
2012–2015	Dead Island 2	Action role-playing game	Deep Silver	2023
2018	HYENAS	First-person shooter	Sega	Cancelled
2018–2021	Outriders	Co-op action rpg shooter	Square Enix	2021
2022–2024	Dune: Awakening	Open world survival MMO	Funcom	2025
2023–ongoing	Exoborne	Third-person extraction shooter	Sharkmob / Level Infinite	To be announced
