= Dambuster Studios =

British video game developer

Deep Silver Dambuster Studios Ltd.
- Company type: Subsidiary
- Industry: Video games
- Predecessor: Crytek UK
- Founded: 30 July 2014; 11 years ago
- Headquarters: Nottingham, England
- Products: Homefront: The Revolution, Dead Island 2
- Number of employees: 194 (2025)
- Parent: Deep Silver
- Website: dsdambuster.com

Deep Silver Dambuster Studios Ltd. is a British video game developer based in Nottingham, England and owned by Deep Silver, itself part of the Embracer Group-owned Plaion. The studio was founded on 30 July 2014, and was set up initially to take over the development of Homefront: The Revolution from Crytek UK; which was closed later that same day, transferring all of its employees to Dambuster.

== History ==
In 2014, Crytek suffered a financial crisis due to internal structuring, and ceased paying wages to the staff members at their UK subsidiary, Crytek UK (formerly known as Free Radical Design). During the development of Homefront: The Revolution, Crytek would sell the Homefront IP to Deep Silver and close down Crytek UK. In accordance with British law, most of Crytek UK's staff members were moved to a new studio founded by Deep Silver called Dambuster Studios to continue Homefront: The Revolution's development. Dambuster Studios is the third Deep Silver in-house development team, following Volition and Fishlabs.

By August 2019, Dambuster had taken over the development on Dead Island 2 from Sumo Digital, and had 140 employees.

== Games developed ==
| Year | Title | Platform(s) | Note |
|---|---|---|---|
| 2016 | Homefront: The Revolution | PlayStation 4, Windows, Xbox One | |
| 2021 | Chorus | PlayStation 4, PlayStation 5, Stadia, Windows, Xbox One, Xbox Series X/S | Assisted Fishlabs |
| 2023 | Dead Island 2 | macOS, PlayStation 4, PlayStation 5, Windows, Xbox One, Xbox Series X/S | |
| 2028 | Dead Island 3 | | |
