= Deep Silver =

Austrian video game publisher

- Type: Division
- Industry: Video games
- Founded: November 2002; 24 years ago
- Headquarters: Höfen, Austria
- Area served: Worldwide
- Products: See List of Deep Silver games
- Parent: Plaion
- Subsidiaries: Dambuster Studios; Fishlabs
- Website: deepsilver.com

Deep Silver is an Austrian video game publisher and a division of Plaion. The company is most known for publishing games such as Metro, Saints Row, Dead Island, and Kingdom Come: Deliverance.

== History ==
Deep Silver was announced in November 2002, with its first release to be Anarchy Online: The Notum Wars. According to Craig McNichol, who ran Koch Media's England branch, the idea behind Deep Silver was to have a business segment that would develop games that would complement the games Koch Media was distributing on behalf of other publishers. McNichol also stated that Deep Silver's name was subject to much internal discussion. Koch Media invested €500,000 in Deep Silver in July 2003, and in November 2003, all of Koch Media's game publishing operations (excluding distribution) were reallocated to Deep Silver. The division had been continuously active since, primarily in Europe. In April 2008, Koch Media opened Deep Silver, Inc., a subsidiary branch based in Los Angeles, under Deep Silver's name. In August 2007, Games That Matter, a studio founded by former Rockstar Vienna employees in 2006, was acquired by Koch Media and became part of Deep Silver under the name Deep Silver Vienna. Co-founders Niki Laber and Hannes Seifert had left the studio by January 2010, at which point Deep Silver Vienna was shut down. Deep Silver Vienna has only produced one game, Cursed Mountain, which was developed in association with Sproing Interactive and released in August 2009 for the Wii.

Deep Silver first gained widespread attention with its release of Dead Island and its acquisition of Volition. Dead Island had been their first release to reach the top spot on sales charts in September 2011, and they acquired Volition in January 2013, alongside the rights to the Metro series, from the bankruptcy proceedings of THQ. Deep Silver also acquired a minority interest in Berlin-based free-to-play game developer Infernum Productions in December 2012. In February 2013, Deep Silver announced its intentions to expand into the mobile games market.

In December 2013, Fishlabs, which had filed for self-administration the previous October, was acquired by Koch Media and became Deep Silver's dedicated mobile game studio. As the agreement was an asset deal, the legal entity of the studio was dissolved and Fishlabs was reorganised as a division, officially known as Deep Silver Fishlabs. In July 2014, Deep Silver acquired the rights to Homefront and its in-development sequel, Homefront: The Revolution, from German developer Crytek. Dambuster Studios (officially, Deep Silver Dambuster Studios) was established to continue the development of The Revolution, succeeding Crytek UK. Later on the same day, Crytek announced that Crytek UK would be closed, and all of its staff transferred to Dambuster Studios. In August 2018, Koch Media acquired the rights to the TimeSplitters games, which would be overseen by Deep Silver.

In May 2020, Koch Media and THQ Nordic, by this time both part of Embracer Group, exchanged several intellectual property rights: Deep Silver received Red Faction and Painkiller, while handing off Risen, Rush for Berlin, Sacred, Second Sight, and Singles: Flirt Up Your Life.

In May 2021, Deep Silver and Koch Media, part of Embracer Group since 2018, announced that Free Radical Design had been re-founded. Work on a new part of the TimeSplitters series is to begin before the end of 2021. In November 2022, Volition was transferred to Gearbox Entertainment, another company under Embracer Group. In December 2023, Free Radical Design was closed down amidst a widescale company restructuring from Embracer Group.

== Controversy ==
In January 2013, Deep Silver announced a special edition of its then-upcoming game Dead Island: Riptide, titled Zombie Bait Edition, which would include a statuette of a mutilated female torso in Europe and Australia. After strong criticism over the item, Deep Silver initially offered an apology, stating that it was "deeply sorry" and promising consumers that something like that would not happen again. However, when the game was released in April that year, the bust was still included, generating further backlash.

In January 2019, Deep Silver partnered with Epic Games on a one-year exclusivity deal for the PC version of their upcoming game Metro Exodus on Epic's digital distribution storefront, the Epic Games Store. Through this deal, Metro Exodus was removed from Steam, another digital distribution storefront, where Deep Silver had been selling pre-orders for the game since August 2018. Additionally, the deal was made and announced less than three weeks prior to game's release, causing criticism and confusion among critics and fans of the Metro franchise. Valve, the company behind Steam, labelled the move as unfair to consumers, while fans review-bombed previous entries of the series on Steam.

== Games ==
Franchises published by Deep Silver include Metro from 4A Games and Volition's Saints Row, both of which were acquired through THQ's bankruptcy auction in 2013, as well as Techland-created Dead Island. Other games include Homefront: The Revolution by Dambuster Studios, Kingdom Come: Deliverance by Warhorse Studios, Shenmue III by Ys Net, and Payday 3 by Starbreeze Studios.
