= List of Techland video games =

This is a list of Techland video games.

== Games developed ==
Year	Title	Genre	PC	7th Gen	8th Gen	9th Gen	Other
1999	Exterminacja (Polish) (Note: Exterminacja (EN: Extermination) also had an English release, Mission: Humanity.)	Real-time strategy	Windows	—N/a	—N/a	—N/a	—N/a
2000	Crime Cities	Action, Combat flight sim	Windows	—N/a	—N/a	—N/a	—N/a
2000	Mission: Humanity (aka. Exterminacja)	Real-time strategy	Windows	—N/a	—N/a	—N/a	—N/a
2001	Chess 2001	Computer chess	Windows	—N/a	—N/a	—N/a	—N/a
2001	Speedway Championships	Sim racing	Windows	—N/a	—N/a	—N/a	—N/a
2001	Survival: The Ultimate Challenge	Strategy, simulation	Windows	—N/a	—N/a	—N/a	—N/a
2001	Bridge 3000	Computer bridge	Windows	—N/a	—N/a	—N/a	—N/a
2001	Pet Racer	Racing	Windows	—N/a	—N/a	—N/a	—N/a
2002	Pet Soccer	Sports	Windows	—N/a	—N/a	—N/a	—N/a
2002	Indiana Jack	Platformer	Windows	—N/a	—N/a	—N/a	—N/a
2002	FIM Speedway Grand Prix	Sim racing	Windows	—N/a	—N/a	—N/a	—N/a
2003	Chess 2003	Computer chess	Windows	—N/a	—N/a	—N/a	—N/a
2003	Hen on Fire: Kurminator	Shooter	Windows	—N/a	—N/a	—N/a	—N/a
2003	Chrome	First-person shooter	Windows	—N/a	—N/a	—N/a	—N/a
2004	Xpand Rally	Racing	Windows	—N/a	—N/a	—N/a	—N/a
2005	Chrome: SpecForce	First-person shooter	Windows	—N/a	—N/a	—N/a	—N/a
2006	Xpand Rally Xtreme	Racing	Windows	—N/a	—N/a	—N/a	—N/a
2006	GTI Racing	Racing	Windows	—N/a	—N/a	—N/a	—N/a
2006	Crazy Soccer Mundial	Sports	Windows	—N/a	—N/a	—N/a	—N/a
2006	FIM Speedway Grand Prix 2	Sim racing	Windows	—N/a	—N/a	—N/a	—N/a
2006	Call of Juarez	First-person shooter	Windows	X360	—N/a	—N/a	—N/a
2008	FIM Speedway Grand Prix 3	Sim racing	Windows	—N/a	—N/a	—N/a	—N/a
2008	Nikita: The Mystery of the Hidden Treasure	Platformer	Windows	—N/a	—N/a	—N/a	—N/a
2008	Nikita: Wild Cars	Simulator	Windows	—N/a	—N/a	—N/a	—N/a
2009	Speedway League	Sim racing	Windows	—N/a	—N/a	—N/a	—N/a
2009	Call of Juarez: Bound in Blood	First-person shooter	Windows	PS3, X360	—N/a	—N/a	—N/a
2010	Nail'd	Racing	Windows	PS3, X360	—N/a	—N/a	—N/a
2011	FIM Speedway Grand Prix 4	Sim racing	Windows	—N/a	—N/a	—N/a	—N/a
2011	Call of Juarez: The Cartel	First-person shooter	Windows	PS3, X360	—N/a	—N/a	—N/a
2011	Dead Island	Action role-playing, survival horror	Windows, Linux/SteamOS	PS3, X360	—N/a	—N/a	—N/a
2011	Dead Stop	Tower defence	—N/a	—N/a	—N/a	—N/a	iOS
2012	Mad Riders	Racing	Windows	PS3, X360	—N/a	—N/a	—N/a
2013	Dead Island: Riptide	Action role-playing, survival horror	Windows	PS3, X360	—N/a	—N/a	—N/a
2013	Call of Juarez: Gunslinger	First-person shooter	Windows	PS3, X360	Switch	—N/a	—N/a
2014	Hellraid: The Escape	Action-adventure, hack and slash	—N/a	—N/a	—N/a	—N/a	iOS, Android
2015	Dying Light	Action role-playing, survival horror	Windows, Linux/SteamOS	—N/a	PS4, XOne, Switch	—N/a	—N/a
2015	FIM Speedway Grand Prix 15	Racing	Windows	—N/a	—N/a	—N/a	—N/a
2016	Dying Light: The Following (Note: Dying Light: The Following is a story mode expansion for Dying Light.)	Action role-playing, survival horror	Windows, Linux/SteamOS	—N/a	PS4, XOne, Switch	—N/a	—N/a
2016	Dead Island: Definitive Collection (Note: Dead Island: Definitive Collection is a bundle that includes remastered versions of Dead Island and Dead Island Riptide, as well as a brand new video game titled Dead Island: Retro Revenge.)	Action role-playing, survival horror	Windows, Linux/SteamOS	—N/a	PS4, XOne	—N/a	—N/a
2022	Dying Light 2	Action role-playing, survival horror	Windows	—N/a	PS4, XOne	PS5, XSX	—N/a
2025	Dying Light: The Beast	Action role-playing, survival horror	Windows	—N/a	—N/a	PS5, XSX	—N/a
TBA	TBA	Action role playing, fantasy					

=== Cancelled and delayed projects ===
- Chrome 2 (on hold)
- Day of the Mutants (cancelled)
- Warhound (on hold)
- Hellraid (on hold)

== Games published ==
Year	Title	Developers	Genre	PC	8th Gen	9th Gen	Other
2009	Konie i Kucyki series (aka Horse and Pony)	DTP Young Entertainment	Simulator	Windows	—N/a	—N/a	—N/a
2017	Torment: Tides of Numenera	inXile Entertainment	Role-playing	Windows, Linux	PS4, XOne	—N/a	OS X
2018	Pure Farming 2018	Ice Flames	Construction and management simulation	Windows	—N/a	—N/a	—N/a
2019	God's Trigger	One More Level	Action	Windows	—N/a	—N/a	—N/a
2019	Arise: A Simple Story	Piccolo Studio	Adventure	Windows	PS4, XOne	—N/a	—N/a
