= Xpand Rally Xtreme =

2006 racing video game

- Developer: Techland
- Publisher: Techland
- Engine: Chrome Engine
- Platform: Windows
- Release: EU: December 1, 2006; NA: May 2007
- Genre: Racing game
- Modes: Single-player, multiplayer

Xpand Rally Xtreme is a racing video game developed and published by Techland for Windows. It is the sequel to Xpand Rally from 2004.

== Gameplay ==
Xpand Rally Xtreme is a rally racing game that features two distinct driving modes: Arcade and Simulation. The Arcade setting simplifies vehicle handling and collision damage for casual play, whereas Simulation mode incorporates realistic surface physics, vehicle wear, and component failure. The game retains the realistic driver injury mechanic from the original Xpand Rally, where high-speed impacts, such as hitting a pole at 200 km/h, result in the driver's death and end the race.

The game features multiple vehicle categories; alongside traditional World Rally Championship-style cars (designated as WRL), it includes off-road 4x4s, buggies, monster trucks, touring cars suited for asphalt circuits, and high-speed GT sports cars, such as those in the "Aces Criterion" class. In total, the roster consists of 23 vehicles. Races take place across 67 tracks, comprising both open cross-country environments and closed-circuit arenas. Game modes include Championship and Free Race, as well as multiplayer support. In addition to the built-in tracks, the game includes the proprietary "ChromEd" track editor, enabling players to create custom courses.

== Development and release ==
Xpand Rally Xtreme was developed by Polish studio Techland using an updated version of its proprietary Chrome Engine. In regional markets such as Spain, the title was distributed by Take-Two Interactive. Ahead of the full commercial release, a playable demo measuring 332 MB was distributed, featuring two race tracks and two vehicle categories across both Arcade and Simulation modes.

== Reception ==
Reception

Review scores
Publication	Score
Micromanía	89/100
PC PowerPlay	60/100
PC Action	75%
Click!	4-/6
Computer Idea	7/10
PC Games	84/100
Everyeye.it	6/10
Multiplayer.it	7.4/10
Jeuxvideo.com	11/20

Xpand Rally Xtreme received generally positive or mixed reviews upon release.

The magazine Micromanía praised its technical quality, graphic and realistic vehicle handling on different surfaces. However, the publication criticized the lack of official licenses and noted the game's steep difficulty for casual players. In the publication PC PowerPlay the reviewers criticized the vehicle physics as unnatural and noted a lack of true rally atmosphere compared to established series like Colin McRae Rally but they praised the variety of the tracks and veichles. Ralph Wollner of PC Action, praised its damage model and extensive content. He noted that controlling vehicles with a keyboard was imprecise and recommended using a steering wheel for optimal gameplay. In the Polish magazine Click! the reviewer acknowledged the game's expansion over its predecessor and praised its increased content, but criticized the lack of real-world vehicle licenses and collision detection issues with the Chrome Engine. Alberto Torgano of the Italian magazine Computer Idea praised its physics engine and detailed vehicle damage model. On the other hand, he noted that the environments felt somewhat artificial, and described the driving controls as strictly arcade-oriented.

Everyeye.it praised its career mode mechanics such as driver injury and financial management and budget price point, while criticizing its physics simulation and heavy reliance on motion blur. Jeuxvideo.com described it as an average title overall. The review noted that the game failed to live up to the expectations set by its predecessor, criticizing its unusual vehicle physics and stating that it lacked sufficient depth for enthusiasts of the rally genre.
