= Dying Light (series) =

- Genre: Survival horror
- Developer: Techland
- Publishers: Techland; Warner Bros. Games (2015-2018)
- Composers: Paweł Błaszczak; Olivier Deriviere
- Platforms: Linux; macOS; Nintendo Switch; PlayStation 4; PlayStation 5; Windows; Xbox One; Xbox Series X/S
- First release: Dying Light; 27 January 2015
- Latest release: Dying Light: The Beast; 18 September 2025

Dying Light is a series of survival horror games developed by Techland. The franchise started in 2015 with Dying Light. A sequel, Dying Light 2 Stay Human was released in 2022. A standalone game, titled Dying Light: The Beast, was released in 2025. The franchise has sold more than 30 million copies since its first release.

== Common elements ==
Dying Light is a series of survival horror games played from a first-person perspective. Both games are set in zombie apocalyptic-themed open world locations that are free for players to explore. Gameplay focuses mainly on melee combat and transversal, with the protagonists in both games being able to use parkour-like movement to quickly move between locations. Dying Light and Dying Light 2 are set in a dense, urban environment, while Dying Light: The Following and Dying Light: The Beast are set in a rural environment where players also have access to a dune buggy. The game features a dynamic day–night cycle, in which zombies are slow and clumsy during daytime and extremely aggressive at night.

== Games ==
Release timeline
2015	Dying Light
2016	Dying Light: The Following
2017
2018	Dying Light: Bad Blood
2019
2020
2021
2022	Dying Light 2 Stay Human
2023
2024
2025	Dying Light: The Beast

=== Dying Light (2015) ===
In Dying Light, Kyle Crane (Roger Craig Smith), an undercover Global Relief Effort (GRE) agent, is airdropped into a fictional Middle-Eastern city called Harran to retrieve a sensitive file which contains vital data on the virus, which could potentially lead to a cure.

The core team of Techland, which had previously released Dead Island in 2011, commenced development on Dying Light in early 2012. Due to creative differences with Dead Island publisher Deep Silver, the team decided to turn Dying Light into a separate game. The team partnered with Warner Bros. Interactive Entertainment to release the game. The game was released in full on 27 January 2015 for PC, PlayStation 4, and Xbox One. It received mixed or average reviews upon release. The game had sold more than 20 million copies and achieved the highest-selling first month of sales for a new survival-horror intellectual property (IP).

=== The Following (2016) and Bad Blood (2018) ===
As the game became a commercial success for Techland, they suspended the development of other games such as Hellraid to focus on further developing the Dying Light IP. Techland released numerous updates for the game, and released an expansion pack for the game, titled Dying Light: The Following, in February 2016. In The Following, Crane must venture to the countryside of Harran to investigate a mysterious cult which may be essential for curing the zombie virus. On the same day, Techland also released Enhanced Edition, which bundled the base game, The Following and several DLC packs, and introduced numerous gameplay updates to the game.

In September 2018, Techland released Bad Blood as a paid early access game. Bad Blood is a battle royale game in which twelve players must compete against each other to be the first one to reach the last helicopter out of town. It failed to gain a large player base, and Techland made the game free for all Dying Light players in 2020.

=== Dying Light 2 Stay Human (2022) ===
Set 22 years after the first game, much of the world's population has been wiped out. The game is set in the fictional walled European city of Villedor, one of the last human settlements. In the game, the player assumes control of Aiden Caldwell (Jonah Scott), who travels to Villedor to search for his lost sister, Mia.

Dying Light 2 is an action role-playing video game, in which Aiden will meet different factions and have to make decisions that fundamentally change the state of the game's world and the fate of various non-playable characters. It was released for Windows, PlayStation 4, PlayStation 5, Xbox One and Xbox Series X and Series S in February 2024 and received mixed reviews. It sold more than 5 million copies in its first month of release. Collectively, the franchise had sold more than 30 million copies by February 2023.

=== Dying Light: The Beast (2025) ===
Kyle Crane must seek revenge on "The Baron", who had experimented on him for 13 years.

Originally intended as the second downloadable content pack for Dying Light 2, The Beast was spun-off into a standalone game after its initial premise, including details of its story, was leaked in 2023. It was envisioned as a smaller game in the franchise. The game is set in Castor Woods, described by the team as a "rural, forested valley" inspired by Twin Peaks. It was released in September 2025 for Windows, PlayStation 5 and Xbox Series X and Series S.

== Future ==
Celebrating the 10th anniversary of the franchise, Techland revealed that they were planning to expand the franchise with board games and a webcomic series.
