= Dying Light: The Following =

2016 video game

- Developer: Techland
- Publisher: Warner Bros. Interactive Entertainment (Note: Warner Bros. published the game on all platforms until 2018, with Techland currently handling publishing duties; future copies has largely omitted the WB Games logo at the start.)
- Directors: Paweł Marchewka; Adrian Ciszewski
- Designer: Tymon Smektała
- Programmer: Michał Nowak
- Writer: Paweł Selinger
- Composer: Paweł Błaszczak
- Series: Dying Light
- Engine: Chrome Engine 6
- Platforms: Linux; Windows; PlayStation 4; Xbox One; macOS; PlayStation 5; Xbox Series X/S; Nintendo Switch
- Release: 9 February 2016: Linux, Windows; WW: 9 February 2016 PlayStation 4, Xbox One; NA: 9 February 2016; POL: 9 February 2016; AU: 10 February 2016; EU: 12 February 2016 (Note: The PS4 and Xbox One versions were released in France, Belgium, Luxembourg, and the Netherlands on 11 February 2016.) macOS; WW: 15 December 2016 Nintendo Switch; WW: 19 October 2021 PS5, Xbox Series X/S; WW: 9 June 2022
- Genre: Survival horror
- Modes: Single-player, multiplayer

Dying Light: The Following is an expansion pack for the first-person survival horror video game Dying Light by Techland and was originally published by Warner Bros. Interactive Entertainment. The story of The Following follows Kyle Crane, who must venture into the countryside of Harran to investigate a mysterious cult whose leader may hold the key to immunity to a zombie virus that plagues the city. The game introduces a large, sprawling rural environment that is two times larger than the map of the base game. While the gameplay continues to focus on parkour, it has a larger emphasis on using firearms to defeat enemies, and the game introduces a dune buggy for both traversal and combat. Players can access this expansion after completing the prologue of the base game.

The release of the original game became a large success for Techland, prompting it to pause development of its other project, Hellraid, to focus on creating more content for the Dying Light franchise. Certain gameplay mechanics of The Following were originally planned for the base game, but were abandoned as the team struggled to finish development of the core game. The team listened to community feedback and decided to add numerous gameplay adjustments, introducing more weapons and refining parkour mechanics. To accommodate vehicular traversal and combat, the team had to completely revamp the artificial intelligence and behaviors of enemies in the game.

Announced in July 2015, the game was released for Linux, Windows, PlayStation 4, and Xbox One in February 2016. It was also released alongside Enhanced Edition, which bundles the base game, The Following, and some of the downloadable content packs released for the original game together. The release of the Enhanced Edition also brings new updates to the base game, introducing a new difficulty mode, Legendary Levels, and bounty missions. The Following received generally positive reviews upon release. Critics praised the map design, progression systems, crafting mechanics, and the introduction of vehicles, while criticizing its characters and quest design. Kyle Crane's story continues in Dying Light: The Beast, released on 18 September 2025.

== Gameplay ==
In The Following, players can explore the Harran countryside with a dune buggy.

Players can begin The Following at any time after completing the prologue of the base game, though Techland recommended that players have at least a level 18 character before starting the expansion. Players can switch back to playing the main game anytime while playing the expansion, and character progression players earned in The Following will be carried to the base game.

As with the base game, The Following is a played from a first-person perspective. Set in a map that is twice as large as the two previous maps of Dying Light, The Following's gameplay is similar to that of the main game, where the infected are slow and fragile during daytime and become aggressive and fast at nighttime. Players can use parkour movements to move between places and kill enemies. One of the new features introduced is a drivable dune buggy, which players can use to travel across the game's world quickly and mow down enemies. It has its own separate skill tree and weapons, including spikes, flamethrowers, UV lights, and electrical cages, and other upgrades can be added to the buggy to increase its combat abilities. The buggy's performance and efficiency are affected by factors including the power of its suspension, engine, and brakes. Players must collect fuel and salvage for engine parts in order to keep the buggy in good condition. They can also choose from 40 different paintjobs and accessory items to customize their vehicle.

As the game is set in a rural environment, the expansion has a larger focus on gunplay. The game features several new weapons, such as a crossbow and a variety of new firearms, such as submachine guns and revolvers. As players explore the world, they will meet non-playable characters and complete side quests for them. As players complete side quests, their trust ranking with the locals will increase, which will unlock opportunities for more gameplay and narrative content. The expansion also supports a four-player cooperative multiplayer mode. Each player has access to their own vehicle, but they can also choose to ride at the back of another player's buggy. Players can complete time trials for driving the buggy at the fastest speed possible or race against each other in co-op mode. The asymmetrical multiplayer mode from the first game, Be The Zombie, also returns in The Following.

The Following was released alongside the Enhanced Edition, which brings numerous updates to the original game. A new "bounty" mode, which split missions into three different categories: "Basic", "Daily", and "Community", was introduced. The missions and objectives included in this mode change every day, and players gain experience points by completing them. The game also features a new difficulty mode named "Nightmare Mode", which extends the duration of nighttime and increases the strength and health of enemies. Actions made in this mode drain stamina from players. The Following and the Enhanced Edition also introduce Legendary Levels, which are unlocked once a skill tree is fully upgraded. Players will start gaining experience points contributing to the 250 Legendary Levels, enabling players to unlock additional combat bonuses and boosts, as well as new outfits and weapons.

== Plot ==
Protagonist Kyle Crane learns from a survivor near death about a supposed cure to the zombie virus. With the survivors running short on Antizin, a drug that slows the process of infection and suppresses its symptoms, and efforts to produce a cure still unsuccessful, Crane decides to go investigate this supposed immunity. He travels to the countryside, where he discovers that many of the survivors out there have converted to a religious cult called the Children of the Sun, who worship the Mother, which is apparently the source of their immunity to the virus. In order to earn the cult's trust and learn more about the immunity, Crane decides to assist the survivors. Eventually, one of the Faceless, the high-ranking members of the cult, approaches Crane and privately admits that their immunity is gained through a special elixir they had discovered, but like Antizin, it only suppresses the infection and does not fully cure it. The Faceless also reveal that they are working on a permanent cure and promise that in exchange for his help, they will give Crane the cure to take back to Harran.

Crane is then tasked with assisting a man named Atilla, who is working on an important project for the Mother. Atilla tells Crane that the Children of the Sun believe in a prophecy where a chosen one would rise up to become the prophet of the God of the Sun and purify the infection. He also reveals that the Mother was Jasmine, the wife of a local military Colonel who was involved in the experiments that caused the outbreak but was bitten during the outbreak. Before succumbing to the infection himself, the Colonel gave Atilla a secret code that Atilla passes on to Crane. Attila then suicides in an attempt to invoke the prophecy, but it fails to occur. Crane then discovers that the remnants of Rais's gang have also traveled to the countryside to search for the supposed cure as well. Rais's thugs stage an attack on the Mother's base in a nearby dam, but when Crane arrives, he finds both Rais's bandits and the Faceless all dead.

Entering the dam, Crane discovers that the Mother has been turned into a sentient volatile. She reveals that the dam was a secret military facility that held a special chemical substance. However, rather than being a cure for the virus, the elixir instead slowly turns whoever uses it into a sentient volatile, like it did to the Mother. During the day, she is able to retain her mental faculties and has been given telepathic abilities in order to communicate, but at night, she becomes an uncontrollable feral monster. The Mother tells Crane that the only way to stop the infection is to summon the God of the Sun to purify the land, sacrificing everybody in Harran in the process. At this point, Crane can choose to either listen to the Mother or defy her.

If Crane chooses to defy the Mother, the Mother attacks, forces him to drink the elixir, and attempts to kill him, but Crane eventually prevails and kills her. Taking what is left of the elixir, Crane leaves the dam, suffering continuous blackouts, and finds himself in a populated area seemingly outside the quarantine but discovers that his exposure to the elixir has already turned him into a sentient volatile. As night falls, the infected Crane lets out a feral scream as a nearby mother and her children watch in terror. This ending is canon as it leads into the events of Dying Light: The Beast.

If Crane chooses to listen to the Mother, she leads him to a nuclear warhead that was originally meant to be a fail-safe to contain the outbreak. Crane inputs the code Atilla had given him, which activates the warhead, presumably destroying all of Harran and killing all of the survivors and infected, taking the virus with them.

== Development and release ==
The Following was developed by Techland and published by Warner Bros. Interactive Entertainment. Gameplay elements from The Following were originally part of the core Dying Light game but were later abandoned as the core game was becoming too large for the team to handle. According to lead designer Maciej Binkowski, the development of the game continued after the release of the first game, and numerous gameplay, audio, and graphical improvements were made. According to Binkowski, the team decided to implement a dune buggy into The Following as they felt that it was a "fantasy" of the zombie genre, and they missed the opportunity when developing the base game. The process of implementing them was described as difficult, as they had to ensure that the new system works functionally with other gameplay mechanics, most notably the parkour system. To achieve this, Techland completely revamped the artificial intelligence and behaviors of enemies to accommodate the fast-moving nature of gameplay. The development team also looked at players' feedback and requests regarding the first Dying Light and decided to add the most demanded features, including a new story and new firearms, to the game. The new campaign lasts for at least ten hours and centers around the theme "mystery". The team was inspired by The X-Files and Twin Peaks, and worked to ensure the story had a different mood when compared with the main game.

In May 2015, it was announced that the development of another Techland video game, Hellraid, had been put on hold so as to allow the studio to allocate resources and time to concentrate on the development of the Dying Light franchise. The Following was announced by Techland in July 2015. To reflect the increased scope and scale of the expansion, Techland raised the game's price on 25 November 2015. It was included in Dying Light: The Following – Enhanced Edition, which bundles The Following with the base game and its downloadable content, except for three DLCs: Harran Ranger Bundle, Gun Psycho Bundle, and Volatile Hunter Bundle. Players of the original game can upgrade to the Enhanced Edition for free. The Following is also free for players who have purchased the base game's Season Pass. The Enhanced Edition was released on 9 February 2016 for Linux, Windows, PlayStation 4 and Xbox One. In March 2016, Techland announced that they would be collaborating with Psyonix for crossover content. Players who owned Dying Light can unlock unique cosmetic items based on Rocket League, while players of Rocket League can customize their vehicles with items based on The Following. It was released for Nintendo Switch on October 19, 2021 as part of Dying Light: Platinum Edition, and PlayStation 5 and Xbox Series X and Series S on June 9, 2022 as part of Dying Light: Definitive Edition.

== Reception ==
Reception

Aggregate score
Aggregator	Score
Metacritic	PC: 79/100; PS4: 78/100; XONE: 86/100

Review scores
Publication	Score
Eurogamer	Recommended
GameSpot	8/10
IGN	9/10
Official Xbox Magazine (US)	4/5
PC Gamer (US)	80/100
Push Square	8/10
USgamer	4/5

Dying Light: The Following received "generally favorable reviews" from critics, according to review aggregator Metacritic.

Tom Stone from Official Xbox Magazine found the controls and handling of the dune buggy to be responsive. Describing The Following as the "real Mad Max game I've been waiting for", he praised the vehicular combat gameplay for encouraging "reckless driving." He added that the game managed to maintain its tension despite the introduction of dune buggies, creating an "undoubtedly exhilarating" gameplay experience, especially during nighttime when the infected become more aggressive. Brandan Graeber from IGN wrote that collecting engine parts and fuel for the dune buggy further expanded the main game's core premise of scavenging resources for survival and liked how the expansion's more open, sparse map design highlighted the versatility of the dune buggy. Scott Butterworth from GameSpot also felt that maintaining the buggy was a "natural evolution" of the main game's crafting system, and he enjoyed the game's progression system, which gradually made the vehicle stronger and more durable.

Butterworth also liked that the new setting encourages players to experiment with new tactics and puts an emphasis on gun combat, an aspect that he considered to be "underutilized" in the main game. Christopher Livingston, writing for PC Gamer, praised the game's faster cadence of rewarding players with new upgrades, making the early gameplay experience more enjoyable. Nathan Ditum from Eurogamer remarked that the game's introduction of Legendary levels provided new challenges for endgame players. While Alex Stinton from Push Square remarked that players who disliked the original game would be unlikely to change their opinion after playing The Following as both games share the same fundamentals of both gameplay and structure, Mike Williams from USgamer was impressed by Techland's ambition and noted that it was "almost a different game hidden in DLC" despite being based on similar concepts. Both Williams and Livingston remarked that The Following was a sizable expansion.

The story received a more mixed reception from critics. Adam Smith from Rock, Paper, Shotgun praised the rural environment for significantly contrasting with the post-apocalyptic urban setting of the original game. He also found the characters and the overall premise to be more interesting than the base game. While Stone felt that the story was engaging, he found the characters to be unlikable and criticized the game's implementation of motion capture and lip-syncing technology. Stone and Graeber praised the varied quest design for keeping the experience engaging throughout. Butterworth remarked the game's objective design relied heavily on fetch quests, though missions did not become monotonous as the game introduced more gameplay options for players. While Graeber remarked the story's initial pacing was slow, he commended the ending for being superior to the original game's narrative conclusion. Butterworth felt that Kyle Crane as a protagonist was lacking in personality, but found the story to be a refreshing and original experience and described it as an "engaging conspiracy thriller complete with tension, intrigue, and a few genuinely surprising twists." Livingston had a negative opinion of the story and found it as "dull" as the main game.

== Sequel ==
A standalone game titled Dying Light: The Beast, which follows Kyle Crane 13 years after the events of The Following, was released on September 18, 2025.
