= Nail'd =

2010 video game

- Developer: Techland
- Publishers: Deep Silver; Cyberfront (Japan)
- Engine: Chrome Engine 4
- Platforms: Microsoft Windows; PlayStation 3 Xbox 360
- Release: NA: November 30, 2010; EU: February 4, 2011; AU: March 10, 2011 (PS3, X360); JP: April 14, 2011 (PC); JP: April 21, 2011
- Genre: Arcade racing
- Modes: Single-player, multiplayer

Nail'd is an off-road arcade racing game developed by Techland for Microsoft Windows, PlayStation 3 and Xbox 360. It was released on 30 November 2010 in North America and in 2011 in the PAL region and Japan. The game focuses on ATV and dirtbike racing, with an emphasis on speed and verticality.

Nail'd was published by Deep Silver and Cyberfront and features a soundtrack including bands such as Rise Against, Slipknot and Queens of the Stone Age.

== Reception ==
Reception

Aggregate score
Aggregator	Score		
Aggregator	PC	PS3	Xbox 360
Metacritic	69/100	66/100	64/100

Review scores
Publication	Score		
Publication	PC	PS3	Xbox 360
Destructoid	N/A	N/A	7/10
Edge	N/A	N/A	5/10
Eurogamer	N/A	N/A	6/10
Famitsu	N/A	30/40	30/40
Game Informer	N/A	8/10	8/10
GamePro	N/A	N/A	3.5/5
GameSpot	N/A	5.5/10	5.5/10
GameZone	N/A	N/A	7.5/10
IGN	N/A	5.5/10	5.5/10
Joystiq	N/A	N/A	3.5/5
Official Xbox Magazine (US)	N/A	N/A	7.5/10
PC Gamer (UK)	76%	N/A	N/A
PlayStation: The Official Magazine	N/A	7/10	N/A
411Mania	9/10	9/10	9/10
The Guardian	N/A	3/5	N/A

Nail'd received "mixed or average" reviews on all platforms according to the review aggregation website Metacritic. In Japan, Famitsu gave the PlayStation 3 and Xbox 360 versions a score of 30 out of 40, while Famitsu X360 gave it a similar score of one seven, one eight, one seven, and one eight.
