= Dying Light: The Beast =

- Developer: Techland
- Publisher: Techland
- Directors: Paweł Marchewka; Nathan Lemaire
- Producers: Szymon Strauss; Michał Broda
- Designers: Marta Fijak; Brice Laborde; Andrey Velkov
- Programmers: Kacper Kowalczuk; Adam Michałowski; Galust Saakov
- Artist: Katarzyna Tarnacka-Polito
- Writer: Paweł Marchewka
- Composer: Olivier Deriviere
- Series: Dying Light
- Engine: C-Engine
- Platforms: PlayStation 5; Windows; Xbox Series X/S
- Release: PS5, Windows, XSXS; 18 September 2025
- Genre: Survival horror
- Modes: Single-player, multiplayer

Dying Light: The Beast is a 2025 survival horror video game developed and published by Techland. Originally envisioned as a downloadable content pack to Dying Light 2 Stay Human, The Beast was released as a standalone game for Windows, PlayStation 5, and Xbox Series X/S on September 18, 2025, ports for PlayStation 4 and Xbox One were in development, before their cancellation on July 14, 2026.

== Gameplay ==
Dying Light: The Beast is an action-adventure video game played from a first-person perspective. The game is set in Castor Woods, a popular rural tourist destination located in the Western Alps which is now overrun by zombies. Players can explore this open world using Kyle Crane's parkour skills, or driving a 4x4 vehicle. Like the first game, the zombies are slow when exposed to sunlight, but they become more aggressive and hostile at night. Crane can utilize a variety of melee weapons and firearms to defeat enemies, as well as superhuman abilities, allowing him to run and sprint faster than typical human beings. He can also enter "Beast Mode", which allows him to launch powerful bare-handed attacks and hurl environment objects at enemies to greatly damage them. As players progress, they will be able to unlock more skills for Crane to further boost his combat prowess. As with its predecessors, the game supports 4-player cooperative multiplayer.

== Story ==
=== Premise ===
Kyle Crane, the protagonist of the first game, returns as the protagonist of The Beast. After his transformation into a sentient volatile at the hands of the Mother in Dying Light: The Following, Crane was hiding from the Global Relief Effort (GRE) for 8 years, but was captured and taken prisoner by a mysterious villain called the Baron, who we later learn is named Marius Fischer. After being subjected to 13 years of torture and experimentation by the Baron, Crane, who now has a mix of volatile and human DNA, escapes captivity and swears revenge on the Baron, while also having to fight the beast within.

=== Plot ===
Years after being captured by the GRE and experimented upon by the Baron, Crane finally has an opportunity to escape when another test subject, subject beta, breaches containment. Taking advantage of the resulting chaos and with the assistance of a woman named Olivia, Crane escapes the lab but discovers that thanks to the experiments performed upon him he is part Volatile and can temporarily gain the strength of one. He meets up with Olivia outside the lab who agrees to assist him in his desire for revenge against the Baron in return for helping her escape the Baron's clutches. She explains that the Baron once owned a biotech company before the outbreak, and now he is obsessed with perfecting the virus so he can gain control over the world. In order to gain the strength to stand against the Baron and his army, Olivia instructs Crane to slay the Baron's experimental beasts called Chimeras, extract the GSB catalyst from their bodies, and use it to empower himself. In addition, he must find allies willing to help him fight against the Baron. Meanwhile, Olivia uses the samples collected from the chimeras Crane kills in order to figure out what exactly the Baron is trying to do with the disease.

Seeking allies, Crane first comes across survivors in the local Town Hall, led by a woman called the Sheriff, who warn him that a "Beast" has been going around hunting down the Baron's men. Upon hearing that the Baron is personally overseeing an operation at a mine, Crane and the Sheriff infiltrate the grounds in an attempt to kill him directly. However, the Sheriff betrays Crane and tries to hand him over to the Baron, but the Beast, his real target, interferes and manages to escape thanks to Kyle, allowing both of them to escape captivity while the Sheriff flees, seemingly with the Baron. The Town Hall's second in command, Jacob, informs Crane about a group of infected who were originally members of the town hall. Called exiles, former test subjects that managed to escape from the Baron's lab and developed telepathy similar to the Mother’s from experiments. Crane makes contact with their leader, Lydia, and captures one of the Baron's scientists, Doctor Camilo Marin, who agrees to help them enhance their telepathic abilities. Which will allow them control over the infected. Meanwhile, Olivia admits to Crane that her father was a scientist in Harran who was studying the virus, and is now being kept prisoner by the Baron.

Eventually, the Baron sends Chimeras to destroy the Town Hall. The Sheriff returns from exile to help Crane defend the Town Hall until Lydia can use her telepathy to take control of the Chimeras and send them away. The Sheriff apologizes to Crane, explaining she was coerced by the Baron into betraying him to protect her people, or she would be killed along with the Town Hall. With the Town Hall and exiles united, Crane figures their next step is to capture the Beast and use him to lure the Baron out of his fortress. He manages to lure the Beast into a trap and subdues him long enough for Lydia to take control of his mind. The Beast later wakes up and reveals that he is Aiden Caldwell (the protagonist of Dying Light 2). He and Spike, an old friend of Crane's from Harran, had teamed up to try and rescue Crane from the Baron's custody, but were captured. The Baron then contacts Crane, revealing he has captured Olivia and Spike, offering to free them in return for turning over Aiden. Aiden escapes and turns himself in to the Baron in hopes of saving Spike, but the Baron changes his conditions and orders Crane to turn himself in as well.

Realizing they are out of options, Crane and his allies decide to assault the Baron's fortress directly, but Olivia ends up betraying them as her father was infected during his captivity, allowing the Baron to capture them all. The Baron reveals that Crane's escape was planned from the beginning in order for Olivia (with Crane's assistance) to finish his work for him, and allow Marius to collect all the GSB samples from Kyle (whom had injected himself with a dose from each Chimera he killed). The Baron then executes Spike and Camilo before Olivia, who faked her betrayal, fights the Baron and distracts him long enough for Lydia to disturb the Baron's consciousness, having already infected himself in preparation for the final strain, and stabbing him in the eye before freeing Crane and his remaining allies. Crane then manages to corner the Baron at his helipad, where he injects himself with the perfected virus to turn himself into the ultimate Chimera. Undeterred, Crane defeats the mutated Baron, and kills him by impaling his heart with a metal pipe. He is then contacted by his former GRE superior, who reveals that the GRE is still active and thanks Crane for dealing with the Baron, since he had become a liability to them. As a reward for his service, the GRE grants Kyle his freedom and Crane’s former superior expresses her hope that they can cooperate in the future. Instead, Crane, Aiden, and Lydia swear to take their fight to the GRE, and end them.

== Development ==
The Beast was originally intended to be the second downloadable content pack for Dying Light 2 Stay Human. After the pack's main story and its script were leaked by a dataminer in April 2023, the team pivoted to turn it into a separate game. Techland described the game as a compact experience, being shorter than both Dying Light and Dying Light 2. Unlike Dying Light 2, the game features a more linear narrative structure. According to Tymon Smektala, Techland's franchise director, the decision to bring back Crane as the game's protagonist was met with enthusiasm within the studio. Crane, who was "older, more haunted, and driven by a strong desire for revenge", was voiced by Roger Craig Smith. Smith added that he was surprised when Techland asked him to return to the role due to the character's fate in Dying Light and its expansion, The Following.

According to Techland, the game had a larger emphasis on survival when compared with Dying Light 2, with the team seeking to "recapture" the fear players may have experienced when they first played Dying Light. Weapons and vehicles degrade over time, encouraging players to adapt to different combat situations. Castor Woods was described by the team as a "rural, forested valley" inspired by Twin Peaks. While the natural setting provided fewer opportunities for players to use parkour skills for transversal, landmarks and buildings in the game were designed to ensure players must use the agility of Crane to reach their objectives. The game uses an evolved version of Techland's C-Engine.

The Beast was officially announced by Techland at Gamescom 2024. The game was initially set to be released for PlayStation 5, Windows, and Xbox Series X/S in August 2025, but in July it was announced that the game would be delayed to September. Players who owned the Ultimate Edition of Dying Light 2 will receive The Beast for free, as Techland "wanted to show appreciation for the community who patiently waited for the DLC". The Ultimate Edition, however, was removed from sale in September 2024.

== Reception ==
Reception

Aggregate scores
Aggregator	Score
Metacritic	(PC) 79/100 (PS5) 78/100 (XSXS) 75/100
OpenCritic	80% recommend

Review scores
Publication	Score
Eurogamer	3/5
Game Informer	8.5/10
GameSpot	8/10
GamesRadar+	4.5/5
IGN	7/10
PC Gamer (US)	70/100
PCGamesN	8/10
Push Square	8/10
Shacknews	7/10

Dying Light: The Beast received "generally favorable" reviews, according to review aggregator website Metacritic.

=== Awards ===
Year	Award	Category	Result	Ref.
2026	The Steam Awards 2025	Outstanding Story-Rich Game	Nominated	
