= Chrome (video game) =

2003 video game

- Developer: Techland
- Publishers: PAL: Gathering; NA: Strategy First
- Engine: Chrome Engine
- Platform: Windows
- Release: POL: June 13, 2003; UK: September 19, 2003; AU: October 3, 2003; NA: October 28, 2003
- Genre: First-person shooter
- Modes: Single-player, multiplayer

Chrome is a 2003 first-person shooter video game developed by Techland and published by Gathering in Europe and Strategy First in North America. It was re-released with additional levels in 2004 as Advanced Battlegrounds: The Future of Combat (in some countries called Chrome: Gold Edition). A prequel, Chrome SpecForce, was released in 2005. In March 2006, Techland announced a sequel, which would feature the latest version of the Chrome Engine, but was reported to be "on hold" soon after.

== Plot ==
Chrome takes place in the final years of the 22nd century, and opens with partners Bolt Logan and Ron "Pointer" Hertz, former special forces members turned freelancers, engaging on a routine mission to the planet Zorg to retrieve corporate blueprints that have been stolen by an unknown party. During the mission, Pointer betrays Logan. Logan meets up with another freelancer named Carrie and the two of them team up.

One year later, Logan and Carrie have become business partners. Their initial mission is on behalf of the mining corporation SPACON, battling a group of pirates that have been hijacking SPACON transport ships and have also kidnapped a nanotechnology scientist.

Later, Logan and Carrie are contracted by SPACON to help colonists on the planet Terbon fight off attacks by a gang of thugs called the Hannibals. Logan learns that a single operative, revealed to be Pointer, has single-handedly massacred the entire SPACON corporation.

SPACON's assets are absorbed by the larger Coretech corporation. Coretech's representative, Nicole Parker, reveals that Dexon and the Hannibals were in the employ of the Zetrox corporation, who want to drive off the colonists from Terbon to seize the resources on their land. Logan embarks on Coretech's behalf to a Zetrox space station to retrieve evidence of Zetrox's illegal actions. Logan succeeds in retrieving the evidence, and rescues Nicole Parker after she is captured by Zetrox soldiers.

Coretech contacts Logan and informs him that Zetrox has developed a nanovirus using Dr. Shybkov's research, which Coretech claims Zetrox plans to use to exterminate the Terbon colonists. They hire Logan to destroy the Zetrox warehouses containing the nanovirus. Pointer is revealed to be working for Coretech. Pointer reveals that the Terbon colonists have discovered Chrome, the most valuable resource in the universe, which is why the corporations are fighting over the planet. Logan pursues Pointer and kills him before he can deploy the nanovirus.

Zetrox's representative reveals that they want to hire Logan to help them forcibly relocate the colonists in order to claim their Chrome-rich land. Simultaneously, John Brown and the colonists want Logan to help them defend their homes from the corporations, a seemingly hopeless fight. At this point, the player can choose to side with Zetrox, Coretech, or the colonists, leading to 3 separate final missions and endings.

If the player sides with Zetrox, Zetrox will forcibly relocate the colonists, leaving them without homes. Logan states that the colonists should be grateful to still be alive. Carrie ends her partnership with Logan.

If the player sides with Coretech, Logan will kill all the armed male colonists defending the colony and Coretech will offer Logan Pointer's former position.

If Logan sides with the colonists, the government will storm Coretech's offices, removing them from the equation. Logan then helps the colonists fight off a Zetrox assault. The grateful colonists offer to share the wealth from their newfound Chrome with Logan and Carrie.

== Reception ==
Chrome

Aggregate score
Aggregator	Score
Metacritic	69/100

Review scores
Publication	Score
Computer Gaming World	4/5
Edge	5/10
Eurogamer	5/10
GameSpot	7.2/10
GameSpy	3/5
GameZone	8.8/10
IGN	7.9/10
PC Format	58%
PC Gamer (UK)	53%
PC Gamer (US)	56%

Chrome is known as the first action game developed in Poland to get a major international release and receive "mixed or average" reviews beyond the country's borders, according to the review aggregation website Metacritic.

== Expansion packs ==
Advanced Battlegrounds: The Future of Combat

Advanced Battlegrounds: The Future of Combat

Aggregate score
Aggregator	Score
Metacritic	56/100

Review score
Publication	Score
GameSpot	6.2/10

Advanced Battlegrounds: The Future of Combat, known in Europe as Chrome Gold Edition, is a standalone expansion pack released in 2004 by Deep Silver and DreamCatcher Interactive. It received "mixed" reviews according to Metacritic.

Chrome SpecForce

Chrome SpecForce

Aggregate score
Aggregator	Score
Metacritic	62/100

Review scores
Publication	Score
GameSpot	5.2/10
PC Format	65%
PC Gamer (UK)	67%

Chrome SpecForce is a standalone expansion pack released in 2005 by Deep Silver and TopWare Interactive. The game serves as a prequel to Chrome, featuring Bolt Logan and Ron "Pointer" Hertz in their days as members of the military special forces. Chrome SpecForce received "mixed" reviews according to Metacritic.
