= Dying Light =

2015 video game

- Developer: Techland
- Publishers: Warner Bros. Interactive Entertainment (2015–2018); Techland (2018–)
- Directors: Paweł Marchewka; Adrian Ciszewski
- Programmer: Michał Nowak
- Artist: Paweł Selinger
- Composer: Paweł Błaszczak
- Series: Dying Light
- Engine: Chrome Engine 6
- Platforms: Linux; PlayStation 4; Windows; Xbox One; macOS; Nintendo Switch; PlayStation 5; Xbox Series X/S
- Release: 27 January 2015: Linux, PS4, Windows, Xbox One; 27 January 2015; macOS; 15 December 2016; Nintendo Switch; 19 October 2021; PlayStation 5; 8 March 2022; Xbox Series X/S; 22 March 2022
- Genre: Survival horror
- Modes: Single-player, multiplayer

Dying Light is a 2015 survival horror video game developed by Techland and originally published by Warner Bros. Interactive Entertainment. The game's story follows undercover agent Kyle Crane who is sent to infiltrate a quarantine zone in a fictional Middle Eastern city called Harran. It features an enemy-infested, open world city with a dynamic day–night cycle, in which zombies are slow and clumsy during daytime and extremely aggressive at night. The gameplay is focused on weapons-based combat and parkour, allowing players to choose fight or flight when presented with dangers. The game also features an asymmetrical multiplayer mode (originally set to be a pre-order bonus), and a four-player co-operative multiplayer mode.

The development of the game began in early 2012, after the team completed the development of Dead Island. The game's parkour system emphasizes natural movement, and David Belle, the pioneer of parkour, was invited to serve as a consultant for the game. To implement that, Techland had to abandon most of the story elements and construct them again from scratch. To create a story that would suit the taste of the American audience, the writing team collaborated with Dan Jolley. The story was inspired by both Heart of Darkness and The Plague. Announced in May 2013, it was released in January 2015 for Linux, PlayStation 4, Windows, and Xbox One. The game was planned to be released on PlayStation 3 and Xbox 360, but these versions were cancelled due to hardware limitations.

At release, Dying Light received mixed reviews from critics, with praise mainly directed at the combat, graphics, co-operative multiplayer, navigation and the day–night cycle, while receiving criticism regarding the story, difficulty, and technical issues. The game was a commercial success, breaking the record for first-month sales of a new survival horror intellectual property and selling 20 million units by April 2022. Techland committed to supporting the game, and released downloadable content packs, content drops and free updates for the game several years after the initial launch. An expansion, titled Dying Light: The Following, was released in February 2016. The sequel, Dying Light 2, was released in February 2022.

== Gameplay ==
The parkour mechanics in Dying Light allow players to leap from one rooftop to another.

Dying Light is a survival horror video game played from a first-person perspective. The game is set in an open world environment called Harran; initially, an area named the Slums can be freely explored, later adding a second area, accessible via sewers, called Old Town. Players traverse this urban environment, which is overrun by zombies. There is an emphasis on parkour mechanics, which allow players to perform actions such as climbing ledges, leaping from edges, sliding, jumping between roofs and zip-lining. A grappling hook allows players to climb up buildings and quickly travel between places. As players explore the game's world, they can scavenge supplies and loot, which can be used to craft new weapons or sold to vendors. The player character can utilise his "survivor sense" to identify all nearby loot and use lock picks to open locked chests and locked vehicles. Players can also complete various side missions by accepting tasks issued by the non-playable characters in the game's safe zones. As players explore Harran, they can also pick up various collectibles such as notes and journals, and listen to voice mail recordings.

Dying Light contains a dynamic day–night cycle. During the day, players can set traps, save random survivors, and make their way to airdrops. The infected are slow, apathetic, and easily visible and they can be easily avoided. Players can use environmental traps, such as spikes, electrified fences, and gas tanks, to kill the infected. At night, the infected transform to become much more dangerous. Without daylight, the senses of the infected become more acute and accurate. They can sprint after the player character, inflict more damage, and gain the ability to jump and climb buildings. For players to avoid contact, they need to use their "survivor sense" to locate and avoid the infected. If the player character is spotted, they can use distractions and traps to reduce the number of infected. Players' main defence against the infected is ultraviolet light, which slows their movement. At safehouses, players can adjust the time of day, skipping night altogether if the player does not feel ready.

The game features a variety of enemies, including the slow, low-level Biters, Bombers which explode when the player character gets too close, Virals which can run quickly, and dangerous Volatiles which only appear at night. The majority of the game's combat utilises melee weapons, with more than 100 weapons and over 1500 weapon possibilities through crafting and customisation. The melee weapons have a limited lifespan and will become degraded and broken if players use them in combat for a long time. Players can repair a weapon a limited number of times or dismantle it for parts. Crafting weapons requires crafting ingredients, such as gauze and metal parts, and a blueprint, which can be scavenged or purchased from a shop. In the second half of the game, players can use ranged firearms: two types of assault rifles and a variety of small firearms and shotguns. Firearms do not break or degrade, but ammunition is generally scarce and the sound from them will attract enemies. Weapons are categorised into different rarities, which are indicated by a weapon's colour. Players can utilise other items such as firecrackers, which distract enemies, and explosives like molotov cocktails, to aid combat. In addition, parkour mechanics are integrated with combat.

The player character's combat efficiency is governed by his health, fitness and stamina. When players take damage, he will lose health, which can be replenished when Crane utilises a medkit or consumes food. Fitness governs his free running endurance, while stamina focuses on how fast Crane becomes tired in combat. A variety of actions in Dying Light can help players to earn experience points. Engaging in combat with enemies will help players to earn power points, while performing parkour movement can earn agility points. Completing missions, challenges, and quests will help players to earn survival points. As players earn experience, they can spend skill points to select new skills from a skill tree. Experience points are boosted when players explore at night, and while survival points are deducted if killed during the day, there is no such penalty at night.

The game features a four-player cooperative multiplayer mode which allows players to explore Harran and complete the campaign together. Players can complete cooperative challenges for experience, such as fighting to kill as many infected as possible and racing against each other to an airdrop. A multiplayer feature included is a game mode known as "Be the Zombie" that allows the player to play as a particularly strong and fast infected mutant called the "Night Hunter" and invade other players' servers. The players who are playing as humans are tasked with destroying the infected nests and surviving attacks performed by the Night Hunter, while the Night Hunter's goal is to deplete the players' collective life pool and therefore prevent them from attacking the nests.

== Synopsis ==
=== Setting ===
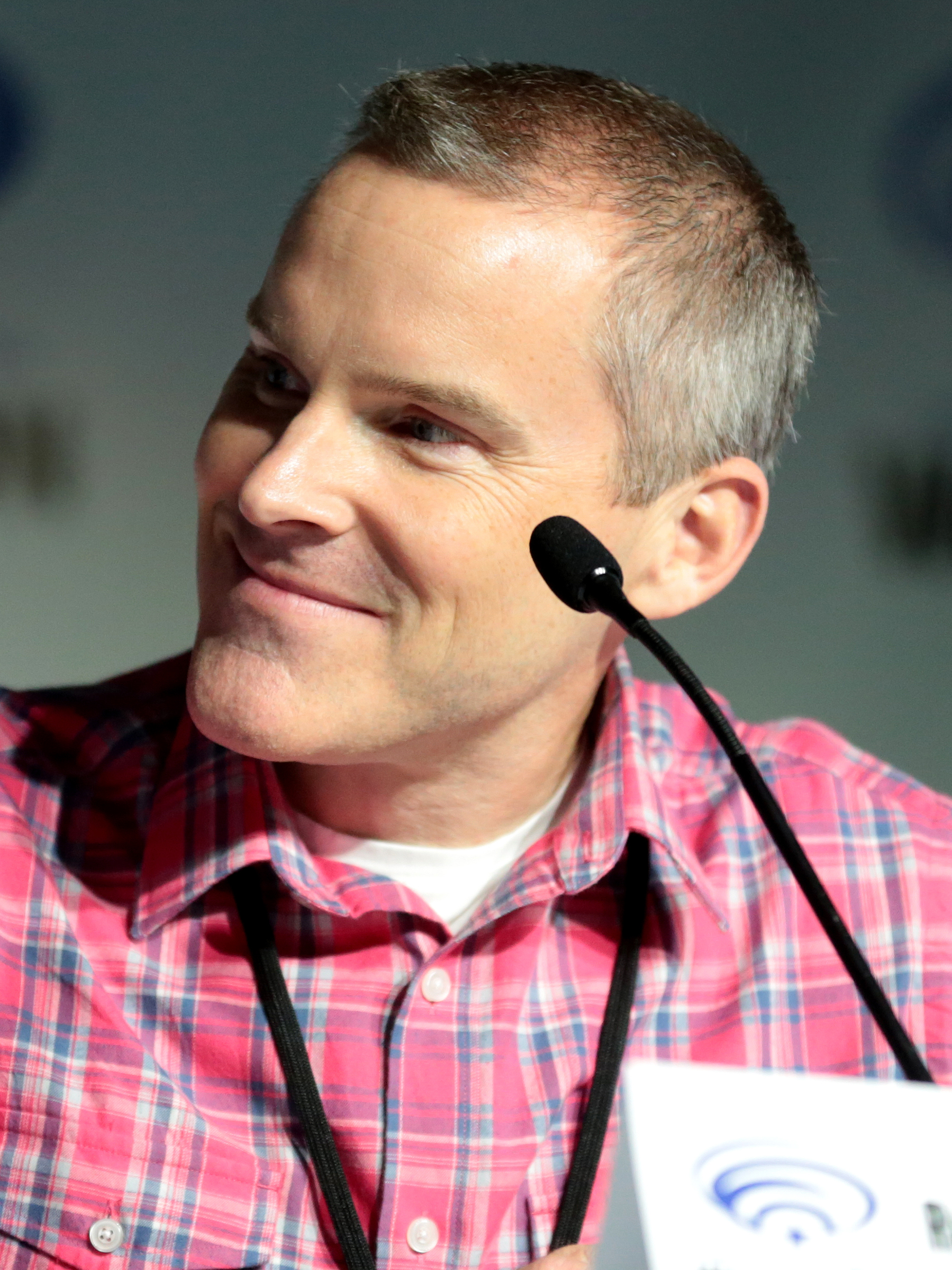
Roger Craig Smith provided the voice for protagonist Kyle Crane.

In the fictional Middle Eastern city of Harran, a mysterious viral outbreak has turned most of the population into hyper-aggressive zombie-like creatures, forcing Harran's Ministry of Public Defence to quarantine parts of the city. The Global Relief Effort (GRE) assists survivors still trapped in the city by regularly airdropping supplies. Players assume the role of Kyle Crane (Roger Craig Smith), an undercover GRE operative sent to infiltrate the quarantine zone to find Kadir "Rais" Suleiman (Jim Pirri), a political figure gone rogue who has a file that contains vital data on the virus, which could potentially lead to a cure. When Crane arrives, he must decide between completing his mission or helping the survivors.

=== Plot ===
Undercover GRE agent Kyle Crane is airdropped into Harran to retrieve a sensitive file stolen by Kadir Suleiman, who is using it for blackmail. Crane is bitten by an infected, though he is rescued by Jade Aldemir and taken to a survivor sanctuary inside a skyscraper called the Tower. Crane is introduced to Rahim Aldemir, Jade's younger brother, who then teaches him the basics of parkour. Crane learns that the Tower is being harassed by a gang of bandits led by a warlord named Rais who steals and hoards supplies from the GRE airdrops. This includes Antizin, a drug that slows the process of infection and suppresses its symptoms. Crane is tasked with reaching an airdrop containing the direly needed Antizin but the GRE instructs him to destroy the airdrop and instead buy the drug from Rais to confirm his identity. Crane reluctantly complies and lies to the Tower that the supplies have been looted.

Upset, Tower leader Harris Brecken tasks Crane with negotiating a deal with Rais. Upon meeting Rais, Crane can confirm that he is indeed Suleiman. Crane carries out a series of unethical tasks for Rais under the assumption that he will be rewarded with two crates of Antizin, but Rais betrays him by only giving him five vials. He later severs relations with the GRE when they halt the supply drops and refuse to help the Tower as the Ministry of Defense intercepts control and forces the GRE to halt the airdrops entirely for political reasons. Desperate to obtain Antizin, Crane and Jade raid Rais's storage facility but they instead find a cache of plastic explosives. Rahim attempts to use the explosives to bomb a Volatile nest, despite Crane's objection. Rahim is wounded, and Crane executes Rahim's plan and destroys all the infected in the nest. However, when he returns, he discovers that Rahim was actually bitten and had turned into an infected while Crane was gone, forcing Crane to kill him.

Meanwhile, a scientist at the Tower named Dr. Imran Zere, who was attempting to develop a cure for the virus, is kidnapped by Rais. Crane attempts a rescue but is also captured. Rais reveals that the file he stole contains proof that the GRE intends to weaponise the virus rather than develop a cure. In the process of escaping, Crane cuts off Rais's hand. Dr. Zere is killed after telling Crane that he had tasked Jade with delivering his research to scientist Dr. Allen Camden. As Crane searches for Jade, he learns that the Defence Ministry is planning to firebomb Harran to eradicate the outbreak, claiming that there are no survivors. Working with the Embers, a survivor group in Old Town, Crane tries to alert the outside world by setting off bombs in an apartment building in the pattern of a sad face, but a jet fires a missile which obscures the pattern.

Jade is captured by Rais, who steals Dr. Zere's research. Crane begins to succumb to the virus as he searches for Jade at a museum; when he reaches her, he finds that she was also bitten and will soon turn into an infected. Watching from a distance, Rais offers Crane one dose of Antizin to save either himself or Jade. Jade sacrifices herself, injecting Crane at the last minute, and protects Crane from Rais's men. Jade then succumbs to the infection and turns, forcing Crane to kill her. After killing Rais's second-in-command, Crane delivers the tissue samples to Dr. Camden, who believes that he is close to developing a cure, but needs the rest of Dr. Zere's data.

Crane then reactivates a radio tower and successfully alerts the outside world of survivors in Harran, thwarting the Ministry's plan. In a desperate effort to evade scandals, the GRE contacts Crane to retrieve Dr Zere's research for them so they can convince the public they are working on the cure, in exchange they will extract him safely from Harran.

Crane discovers that Rais is giving Dr. Zere's research to the GRE in exchange for extraction from Harran. Crane assaults Rais's headquarters and battles him atop a skyscraper, just as a GRE helicopter appears. Crane throws Rais off the building and narrowly recovers the research data; he decides to give it to Dr. Camden and stays in Harran to help the remaining survivors.

== Development ==
The core team of Techland, which had previously released Dead Island in 2011, commenced development on Dying Light in early 2012. While the team was evaluating the feedback from Dead Island and identifying areas to improve, they felt that their new project deviated considerably from the original Dead Island and warranted the need to make it a completely separate game. Techland director Adrian Ciszewski noted the difference in creative vision between the studio and Dead Island publisher Deep Silver, whose control over the title prevented the studio from realising their vision. For this reason, Techland decided to split from Deep Silver and develop a new property. The development team considered Dying Light an opportunity to prove that the studio could make a AAA game. Warner Bros. Interactive Entertainment served as the game's publisher and gave Techland complete creative control over the project.

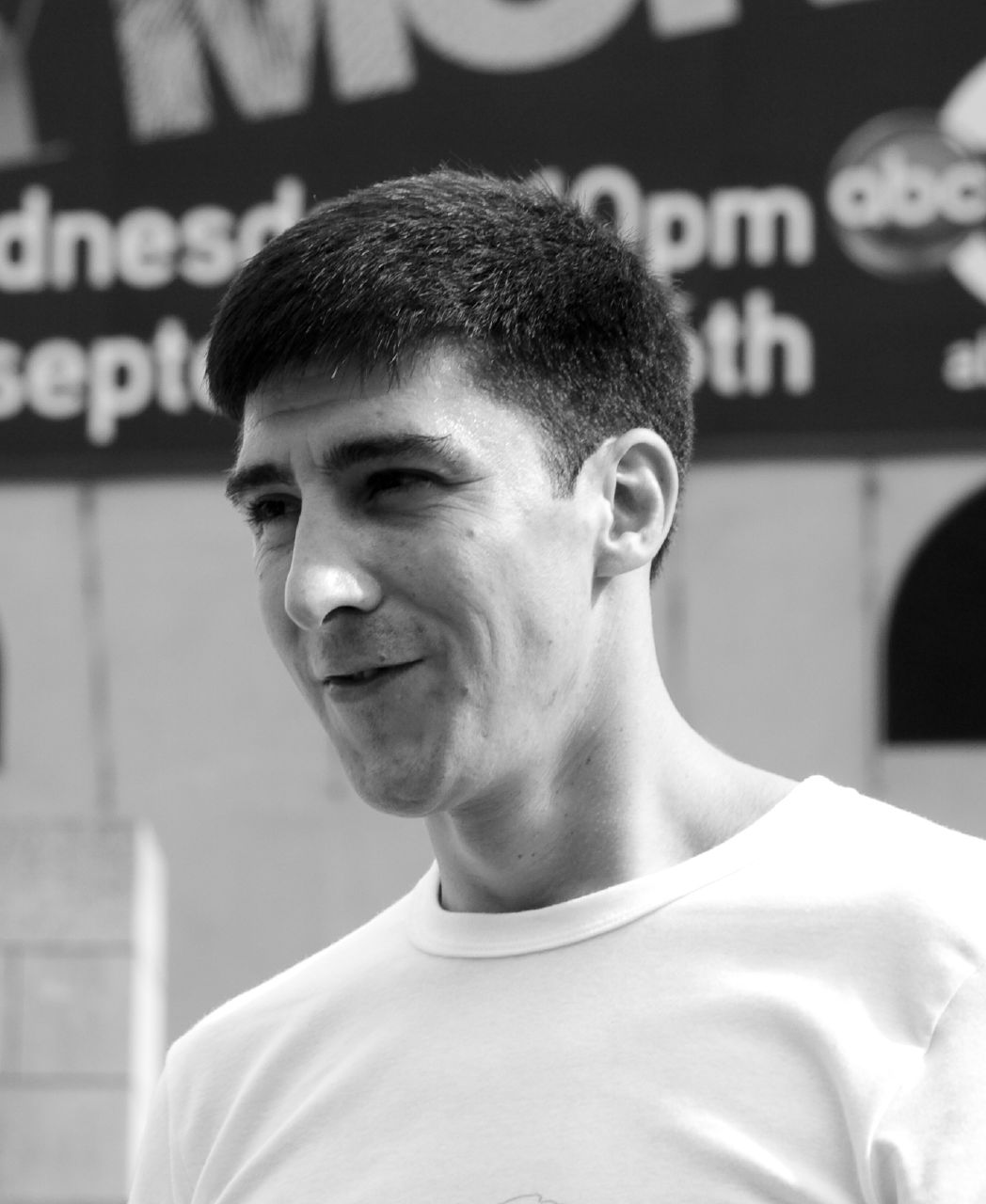
David Belle, the pioneer of parkour, was consulted by the development team.

Parkour is an important part of the game. The team felt that the gameplay experience would be restricting if players could not jump over or climb environmental obstacles or perform other basic movements. As the game is a survival game, the team believed that players should be allowed to flee from danger and that restricted movement options would hinder players' immersion. The team initially aimed to implement a system similar to that of Mirror's Edge's parkour mechanic, in which players climb up specific rooftops or walls by use of a hook, an environmental object that the player character can interact with. However, as development progressed, the team found that the hooks were limiting players' freedom, since developers were placing hooks in very specific locations. In addition, when one designer changed the position of a hook, he also needed to adjust the locations of other hooks, which was a very troublesome process. Starting in 2012, programmer Bartosz Kulon decided to implement a system that scans all possible climbable objects and recognises them as hooks. The engine would then determine what type of object the player is climbing and choose an appropriate animation for the game to render. The new system, which was named "Natural Movement", saved the designers considerable time. However, it created multiple problems. For instance, since players can now approach an objective from various directions and reach previously unreachable areas, the artificial intelligence (AI) controlling the enemies cannot spawn out of nowhere. The existing animations resulted in various glitches, as the player character would often clip through structures. Some playtesters experienced motion sickness. This resulted in major changes in animations, AI, and the heads-up display. The studio had to abandon most story and quest ideas and start again. The team invited David Belle, the pioneer of parkour, to ensure that the parkour animations were grounded in reality.

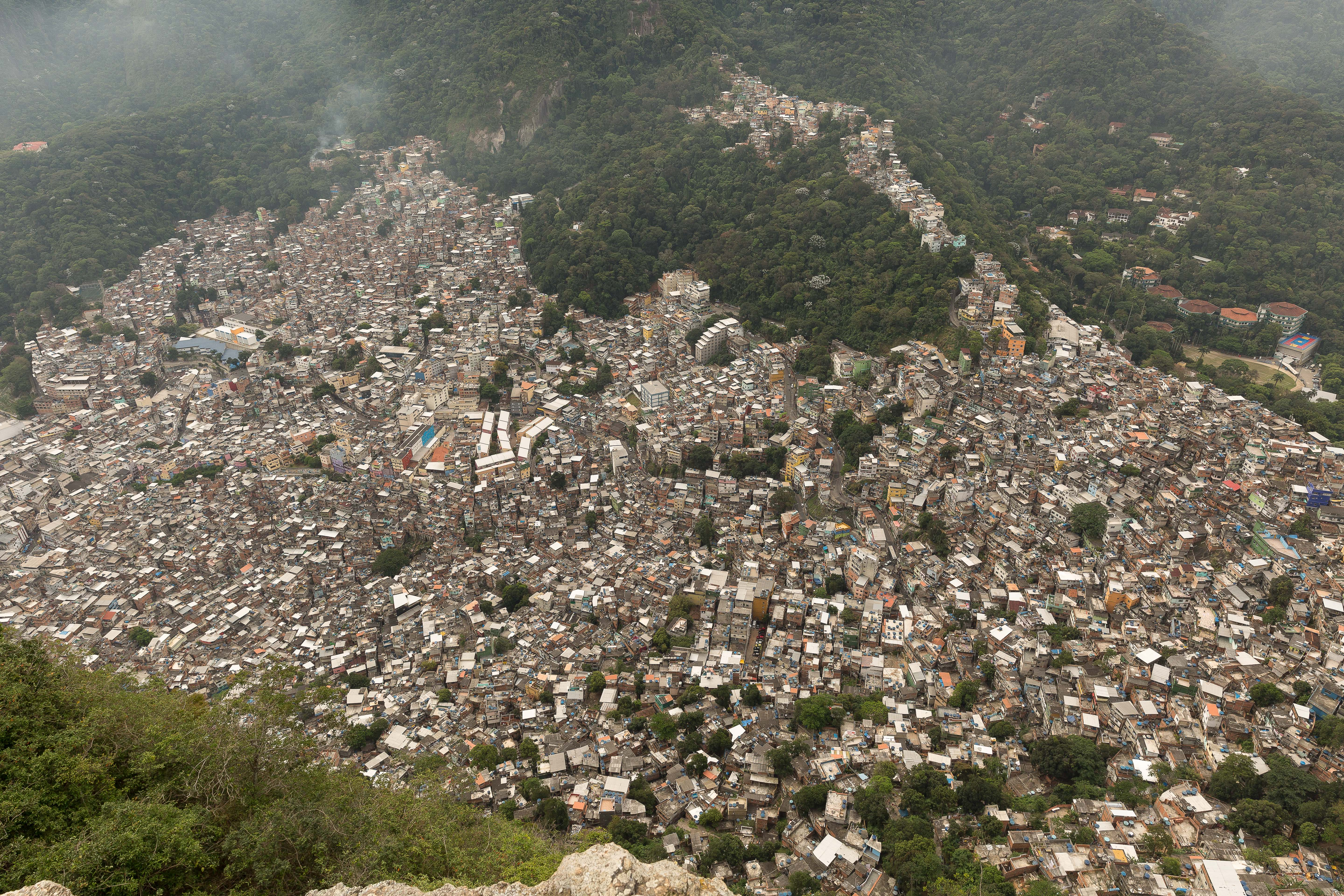
Harran was inspired by the Rocinha favela of Brazil.

The day–night cycle concept was envisioned by Ciszewski prior to the production of Dead Island, but was not implemented in that title due to the team's limited size and resources. The vision was for Dying Light to be "two games in one box", since the gameplay experience during the day would be completely different to the experience at night. Harran is a fictional city located in Middle Eastern territories, and Mumbai and Istanbul served as its major inspirations. The Old Town was inspired by Wrocław, Poland, where Techland was located. The game's level designer, Jula Arendt, is a qualified architect and created the history of Harran, which influenced its architectural design. Inspired by the Rocinha favela of Brazil, Harran was designed to be a city with many windows and interiors which serve as possible parkour routes for the players.

Another reason why Techland did not make Dying Light a sequel to Dead Island was because the team wanted to create a survival game with a serious tone, while Dead Island's story is lighthearted and the game features mostly hack and slash gameplay. According to producer Tymon Smektała, the team aimed to create a story that was "more mature and more serious". Concerned that their team of Poles would not be able to write a story that appealed to North American audiences, Techland invited DC Comics writer Dan Jolley to be a consultant for the story. Inspirations for the story were drawn from novels such as The Plague and Heart of Darkness. Despite the serious tone, the game features some exotic weapons. Game designer Maciej Binkowski felt that the game featured "Hollywood realism", and that they did not intend to make over-the-top weapons like the Dead Rising series. Like Dead Island, the game's combat was melee-focused, and the team invited a group of Krav Maga technique experts to show the programmers and designers "what it was like to hit something" in order to further refine the game's combat.

Techland audio director Paweł Błaszczak composed the music for Dying Light. He took inspiration from 1970s and 1980s movie soundtracks, seeking a sadder tone which he felt was more appropriate than typical horror music for the game's post-apocalyptic setting. He made frequent use of synthesizers to "present a feeling of abandonment, emptiness and sadness" to players. When composing music for the night section of the game, he aimed to achieve a silent atmosphere. The team eventually created a whistling sound, which they felt made enemy encounters at night more eerie and disturbing.

== Marketing and release ==
Dying Light was announced in May 2013. The game was originally planned for release in 2014, but it was later delayed until February 2015 due to a "desire to innovate", and to improve the parkour elements of the game. The game's release date was later brought forward to 27 January 2015 for personal computers, PlayStation 4, and Xbox One. The PlayStation 3 and Xbox 360 versions of the game were cancelled, due to "thorough internal testing" that demonstrated these consoles could not handle the game properly. Techland originally aimed to deliver the game at 60 frames per second (FPS) on both PlayStation 4 and Xbox One. However, according to senior game producer Adrian Ciszewski, Dying Light's frame rate was locked at 30 FPS on consoles to be able to deliver native 1080p graphics, reduce input lag to a minimum, and provide a smoother and more gameplay-tailored performance. Dying Light was the debut title for Techland's own Chrome Engine 6.

On 17 January 2015, Techland announced that physical copies of Dying Light had been delayed due to a "longer lead time than digital". The delay affected the Middle East, Asia, Australia, and Europe. Techland announced that the game would still be available digitally on its scheduled release date. The physical copies of Dying Light for the affected regions were released on 27 February 2015. "Be the Zombie" mode, originally a pre-order bonus, was made free for everyone who purchased the game regardless of platform and territory. Pre-orders of the physical copies of the game also received the "Cuisine & Cargo" and the Ultimate Survivor Bundle downloadable content (DLC) packs for free. Players who pre-ordered the game received bonus rare weapons. Early adopters were awarded with more in-game weapons. On Steam, players could pre-order four copies of the game for the cost of three.

The game's season pass included three post-launch DLC packs. "Cuisine & Cargo", was released on 10 February 2015. It introduced two narrative missions in which the player investigates buildings which were cordoned off during the early days of the zombie apocalypse. The second DLC, "Ultimate Survivor Bundle", was released on 10 March 2015, and added new character skins and weapon blueprints to the game. It was released alongside a free hard mode, which introduced a new tier of weapon rarity and extends the duration of night. The third DLC, titled "The Bozak Horde", added a location called Harran Stadium and a horde mode, which tasks players to complete various objectives. It was released on 26 May 2015. To keep the game's player base engaged, Techland held a variety of community events and challenges regularly following the game's launch.

On 2 February 2015, a patch disabled mod support for the game. At the same time, a mod that removed film grain from the game was taken down by the Entertainment Software Association (ESA) under the Digital Millennium Copyright Act. Techland later explained that the problem was an accident, caused by a side-effect of the release of a patch, and that they were developing a patch to restore modding. The ESA later apologised for issuing the takedown, stating that "the requests were issued erroneously by a third-party vendor on the organization's behalf". On 15 February 2015, a patch that restores modding was released. Techland further released the source development tool for modders in April 2015, allowing players to create custom maps and stories. Selected community maps were later released for the console version of the game in 2016.

Techland launched several promotional campaigns for the game. A "My Apocalypse Collectors Edition", which cost £250,000 (roughly $386,000 at the time) at release, was announced on 25 February 2015. In addition to a special edition of the game, it included a physical zombie shelter, parkour lessons, night vision goggles and a trip to Techland in Poland. On 25 June 2015, in parody of a promotional campaign between Destiny and Red Bull, Techland announced that it would give away codes for premium weapons to players who tweeted a picture of themselves drinking a glass of water. This was later expanded into the "Drink for DLC" campaign, with the planned release of multiple pieces of free DLC for the game if a certain amount of pictures were posted.

A standalone expansion, The Following, was released on 9 February 2016. The title would be free to all players who purchased Dying Light's season pass and also be available for separate purchase. The Following introduces a new story campaign, controllable vehicles, and a map the size of all the Dying Light maps combined. The expansion released alongside Dying Light: The Following – Enhanced Edition, which includes the base game, all DLC and content updates, and the expansion. A gameplay demo was released on 26 August 2015. The demo offers three hours of gameplay content and supports four-player co-operative multiplayer. Enhanced Edition was released for macOS on 15 December 2016.

In December 2017, Techland announced that they would release 10 content packs within the following 12 months. These content drops included new weapons, new enemies, a new map called "Prison Heist", and a time-attack mode. It partnered with the developers of Left 4 Dead 2, Chivalry: Medieval Warfare and Rocket League to create crossover content. A story mode, which drastically lowers the game's difficulty, was added in February 2020. In July 2020, Techland released Dying Light: Hellraid, a DLC pack inspired by the studio's unrealised project, Hellraid. In this DLC, players fight demonic monsters with medieval weapons.

Dying Light was bundled with all of its DLC for the "Platinum Edition", which was released for PlayStation 4, Windows, and Xbox One on 27 May 2021. Techland released the same edition for Nintendo Switch on 19 October 2021. A patch for the PlayStation 4 version of the game bringing resolution, draw distance and framerate enhancements was released for the PlayStation 5 on 8 March 2022. A performance patch was released for Xbox Series X and Series S on 21 March 2022. On 9 June 2022, Techland released Dying Light: Definitive Edition, which bundles the base game with all the downloadable content packs released.

== Reception ==
Reception

Aggregate score
Aggregator	Score
Metacritic	PC: 75/100; PS4: 74/100; XONE: 74/100

Review scores
Publication	Score
Destructoid	7/10
Eurogamer	7/10
Game Informer	8.5/10
GameSpot	7/10
IGN	8.5/10
PC Gamer (US)	70/100
Polygon	6.5/10
USgamer	3.5/5
VentureBeat	87/100

=== Critical reception ===
According to review aggregator website Metacritic, the PC version of the game received "generally positive reviews" upon release. The PlayStation 4 and Xbox One versions received "mixed or average" reviews.

Dan Whitehead from Eurogamer felt that the story, despite being predictable, was serviceable, though he noted that the main campaign was "repetitive". Writing for USgamer, Mike Williams described the hero as "generic", though he praised Roger Craig Smith's performance as Kyle Crane. Jeff Grubb from VentureBeat also criticised the writing and felt that the story does not make sense. Destructoid's Chris Carter lamented that the story was uninspired, and that the characters featured in the game were "contrived and boring". Kevin VanOrd from GameSpot stated that the story "lumbers through one cliche after another", though he remarked that it is "perfectly palatable", praising the voice acting and the expressive facial animation in the cutscenes. Mikel Reparaz from IGN believed that the characters were interesting, though "under-developed". He felt that the story was surprisingly straightforward, and wrote that the villain was "entertainingly cliched". In contrast, Brian Shea, writing for Game Informer, praised the story for being immersive, and remarked that the players will slowly grow attached to the characters.

Grubb praised the responsive controls and liked the upgrade options and the progression system, which rewards players for taking risks during the night. He added that night gameplay was "exhilarating" and "truly terrifying". Christopher Livingston from PC Gamer agreed, stating that the differences between daytime and night-time gameplay were "remarkable". VanOrd also felt that night-time gameplay was a terrifying experience and believed that it had successfully created tense moments. However, he felt that the melee combat was not as "fulfilling" as it is in Dead Island. Carter, however, enjoyed the game's combat which he described as "deliberate" and regarded it as an improvement over the original Dead Island. Shea also liked the combat due to the "sheer brutality of the hand-to-hand animations", though he criticised the gunplay for not being as polished as the melee combat. Williams wrote that the free-running mechanic is "a ton of fun", and that he can "spend hours moving from one section of the city to the next". VanOrd also applauded the free running system, saying that it "energizes moments of great tension", and that climbing tall structures can be "an anxious exercise in precision".

Several critics believed that the game should be streamlined, with some singling out the weapon-breaking mechanic and the crafting system. Williams believed that they existed only to lengthen the game. Whitehead believed that these systems prevented players from taking a proactive role in combat. He also felt that the survival focus would cause players to lose interest. Carter agreed that Techland should have streamlined the game's micromanagement and kept the focus on combat. Arthur Gies from Polygon wrote that many of the systems in Dying Light were "clunky" and poorly implemented, and he lamented that the game was extended by "stringing objectives as far away from one another as possible". Williams felt that the side missions of the game generally contained better narrative than the main quests. However, he was disappointed that most of these missions were fetch quests. VanOrd agreed and likened the protagonist to an "errand boy", finding the objectives to be uninspiring and frustrating, adding that they were mostly "frustrating slogs, or simply bad ideas". The game was often criticised for its lack of innovation, as the game features many elements commonly found in other AAA open-world games such as The Elder Scrolls V: Skyrim, Assassin's Creed, and Far Cry. Both VanOrd and Whitehead felt that the zombies become an annoyance in the game rather than an enemy.

Whitehead praised the game's multiplayer, adding that the cooperative challenges make the game's world reactive and fresh, and give players reason to stay engaged after they finished the campaign. He also praised the asymmetrical multiplayer mode and stated that it was "a blast" if players play in a full lobby. Reparaz agreed that the game is better when it is played with several friends, though he remarked that the gameplay can be unbalanced in the asymmetrical multiplayer mode if the lobby is not full. Shea also believed the multiplayer enhances the experience and that cooperative gameplay enables the campaign's difficult sections to become more "approachable". VanOrd liked the asymmetrical multiplayer, as he felt that it extended the tension created during the night. However, Livingston was not impressed, calling it a half-baked version of Left 4 Dead. Gies was concerned that this mode is merely a "distraction" and that it lacks sufficient depth and development.

=== Sales ===
In the first week after its release, 1.2 million people played Dying Light. The retail version of Dying Light debuted at No. 1 on the US software sales chart, outselling heavy competitors such as Grand Theft Auto V and Call of Duty: Advanced Warfare. Dying Light has the highest-selling first month of sales for a new survival-horror intellectual property, breaking the record previously held by The Evil Within. The game also reached No. 1 on the UK software retail chart for two weeks, outperforming other major releases in February such as The Order: 1886 and Evolve, despite the game having been released a month earlier in digital format. In its first 45 days after its release, 3.2 million people played Dying Light, making it the most popular game that Techland had developed. Techland announced 4.5 million players had played the game by May 2015. The game had sold five million units by August in the same year. More than 17 million players had played the game by December 2019. By April 2022, the game had sold 20 million units.

== Sequels and related media ==
A prequel novel, Nightmare Row, written by Raymond Benson, was released on 8 April 2016. The story revolves around Mel Wyatt and her brother Paul, who were trapped in a hotel after the outbreak.

In May 2015, it was announced that the development of another Techland video game, Hellraid, had been put on hold to allow the studio to allocate resources and time to concentrate on the development of the Dying Light franchise. A spin-off of the game, titled Dying Light: Bad Blood, was released in early access in 2018. It is a battle royale game that pits 12 players against each other on a small map. The game failed to attract many players, and Techland made it available for all Dying Light players for free in January 2020.

A sequel, Dying Light 2, was released in February 2022 for PlayStation 4, PlayStation 5, Windows, Xbox One, and Xbox Series X and Series S. A second sequel game titled Dying Light: The Beast, which stars Kyle Crane as its recurring protagonist, was released on the 18th of September 2025 for PlayStation 5, Windows, and Xbox Series X and Series S.
