= Xpand Rally =

2004 video game

- Developer: Techland
- Publisher: TopWare Interactive (Micro Application in France)
- Designers: Paweł Selinger; Paweł Zawodny; Paweł Błaszczak; Maciej Jamrozik
- Engine: Chrome Engine
- Platform: Windows
- Release: EU: September 24, 2004; NA: April 4, 2006; WW: August 24, 2006 (Steam); Xtreme: EU: December 1, 2006; NA: October 8, 2008 (Steam)
- Genre: Racing
- Modes: Single player, multiplayer

Xpand Rally is a 2004 rally racing game developed by Techland for Microsoft Windows. It contains 60 tracks where players can drive against 120 different rally drivers. A sequel, Xpand Rally Xtreme, was released in 2006. A Xbox version was in development, but never released.

== Reception ==
Reception

Aggregate score
Aggregator	Score
Metacritic	82/100

Review scores
Publication	Score
IGN	8/10
PC Gamer (UK)	74%
PC Gamer (US)	79%

The game received "favorable" reviews according to the review aggregation website Metacritic.
