= Dying Light 2 =

2022 video game

Dying Light 2 Stay Human
- Developer: Techland
- Publisher: Techland
- Directors: Adrian Ciszewski; Marc Albinet
- Producers: Paweł Marchewka; Eugen Harton; Adrian Sikora
- Designer: Tymon Smektała
- Programmer: Grzegorz Świstowski
- Artists: Katarzyna Tarnacka-Polito; Eric Cochonneau; Paweł Selinger
- Writer: Piotr Szymanek
- Composer: Olivier Deriviere
- Series: Dying Light
- Engine: C-Engine
- Platforms: PlayStation 4; PlayStation 5; Windows; Xbox One; Xbox Series X/S; Nintendo Switch
- Release: PS4, PS5, Windows, Xbox One, Xbox Series X/S; February 4, 2022; Nintendo Switch; TBA
- Genres: Action role-playing, survival horror
- Modes: Single-player, multiplayer

Dying Light 2 Stay Human is a 2022 action role-playing survival horror game developed and published by Techland. The game is a sequel to Dying Light, and was released for PlayStation 4, PlayStation 5, Windows, Xbox One, and Xbox Series X/S on February 4, 2022. A cloud version for the Nintendo Switch is in development. It received generally favorable reviews, with praise directed at the combat, parkour system, and open world, but criticism for the story. It sold 5 million units in its first month of release.

== Gameplay ==
Aiden Caldwell uses a paraglider to quickly traverse the city.

Dying Light 2 is an action role-playing survival horror video game featuring a zombie apocalyptic-themed open world. Set 22 years after Dying Light, it stars a new protagonist named Aiden Caldwell (voiced by Jonah Scott), who has various parkour skills. Players can perform actions such as climbing ledges, sliding, leaping off from edges, and wall running to quickly navigate the city. It was confirmed that there are over 3000 parkour animations to give a more fluid free-running experience. Tools such as a grappling hook and a paraglider also aid traversal in the city. Aiden can also use the undead to break his fall. The game is mostly melee-based with the majority of fighting using melee weapons. The melee weapons have a limited lifespan and will degrade as the player uses them in combat. Long-range weapons such as crossbows, shotguns, and spears can be used as well. Weapons can be upgraded with different blueprints and components which can be found by breaking down weapons for craft parts. Aiden can utilize superhuman skills due to the infection. New zombies have been added. Like the first game, the zombies are slow when exposed to sunlight, but they become more aggressive and hostile at night. During the latter time of day, players can avoid zombies roaming the streets by staying on rooftops, who would otherwise hibernate inside buildings to avoid sunlight or explore the safe interior of buildings to find items.

The game is set in the city of Villedor, a massive urban open world set in Europe that players can explore freely. The map, which is four times bigger than the first game, is broken into seven distinct regions and each has its own landmarks and locations. When exploring the city, players can scavenge for scrap and resources to craft new items and weapons. Players can activate windmills to attract survivors and merchants to set up settlements. As the player explores the city, they will find inhibitors, which can be used to increase Aiden's health or stamina. Players meet different factions and have to make decisions that fundamentally change the state of the game's world and how non-playable characters view Aiden. The consequences are far-reaching, with the player being able to bring prosperity to a faction while completely destroying another settlement. Making certain decisions will open up or seal-off areas in the city, encouraging players to complete multiple playthroughs. Like its predecessor, the game features four-player cooperative multiplayer.

== Story ==
=== Setting ===
The game takes place after the events of Dying Light; the 2014 mutated rabies-like outbreak in the fictional Middle Eastern city of Harran (the setting of Dying Light) ended with the “death” of all of the people in Harran. The international organization called the Global Relief Effort (GRE) was eventually able to develop a vaccine for the Harran Virus, ending the threat of a global pandemic, but the GRE continued experimenting on the virus in secret, intending to use it as a biological weapon.

In 2021, a mutated variant of the virus, named the Tachytransmissive Harran Virus (THV), escaped a GRE lab and started a second, more deadly pandemic that spread faster than the first, sweeping across the world and causing millions to transform into monsters. In the following global event called "The Fall", the GRE's vaccine and "Antizin" (suppressant that delays the symptoms) became ineffective against the new strain of THV, but if an individual were to be infected, their symptoms could be suppressed with ultraviolet light, which could also be used to ward off and harm the infected.

By 2036, fifteen years after the Fall, most of the world's population has been wiped out, human civilization has been reduced to a handful of scattered settlements, with the fictional walled European city of Villedor being one of the largest. Originally quarantined by the GRE, Villedor was spared the worst of the pandemic thanks to its quarantine walls keeping the hordes of infected out of the city. Control of the city is split between several factions, including the militaristic Peacekeepers, the independent Survivors, and the violent Renegades.

The main protagonist Aiden Caldwell is a Pilgrim: an individual brave enough to make the dangerous trek between human settlements. He decides to travel to Villedor in order to search for his lost sister, Mia.

=== Plot ===
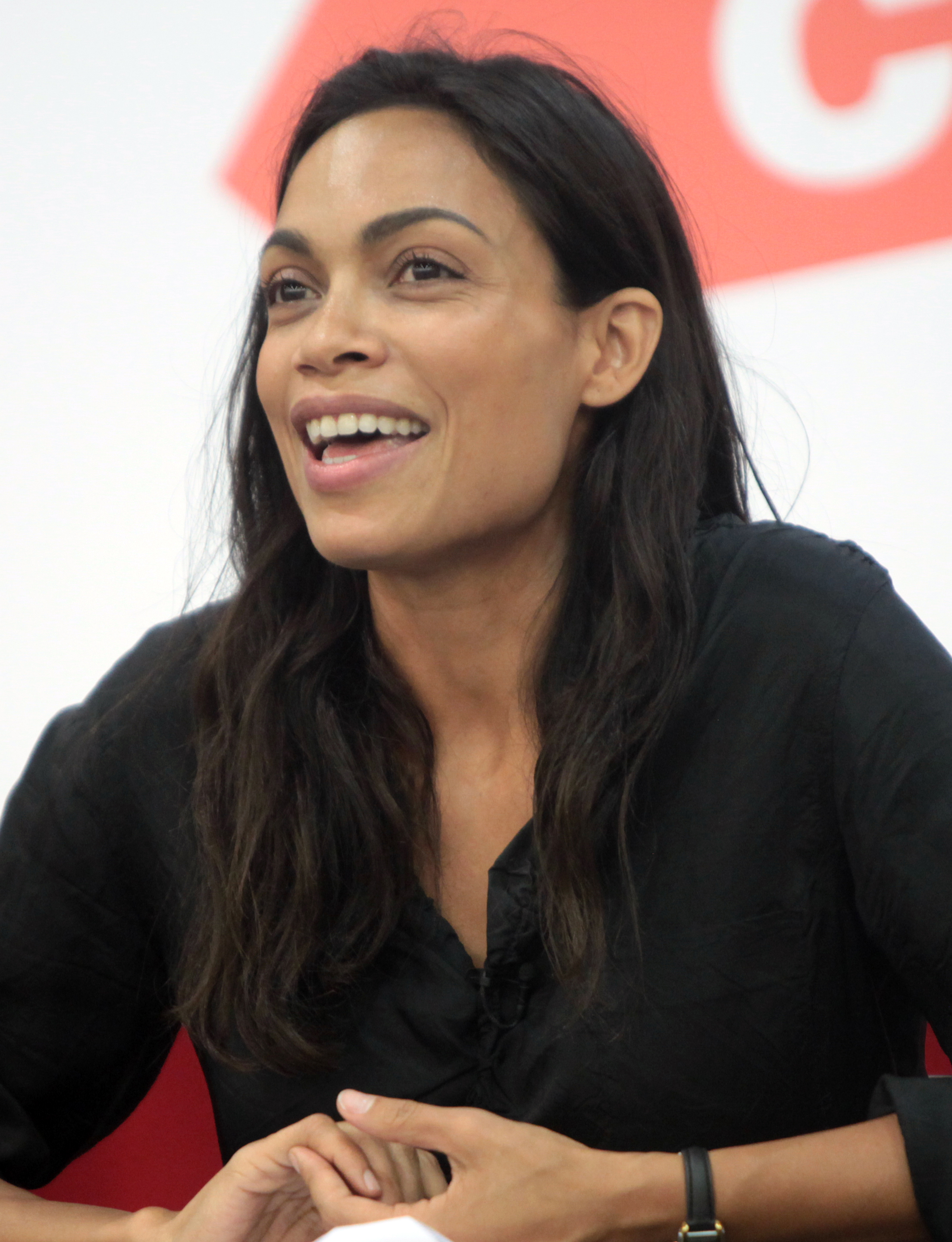
Rosario Dawson provided the voice and motion capture for Lawan, a major character in the game.

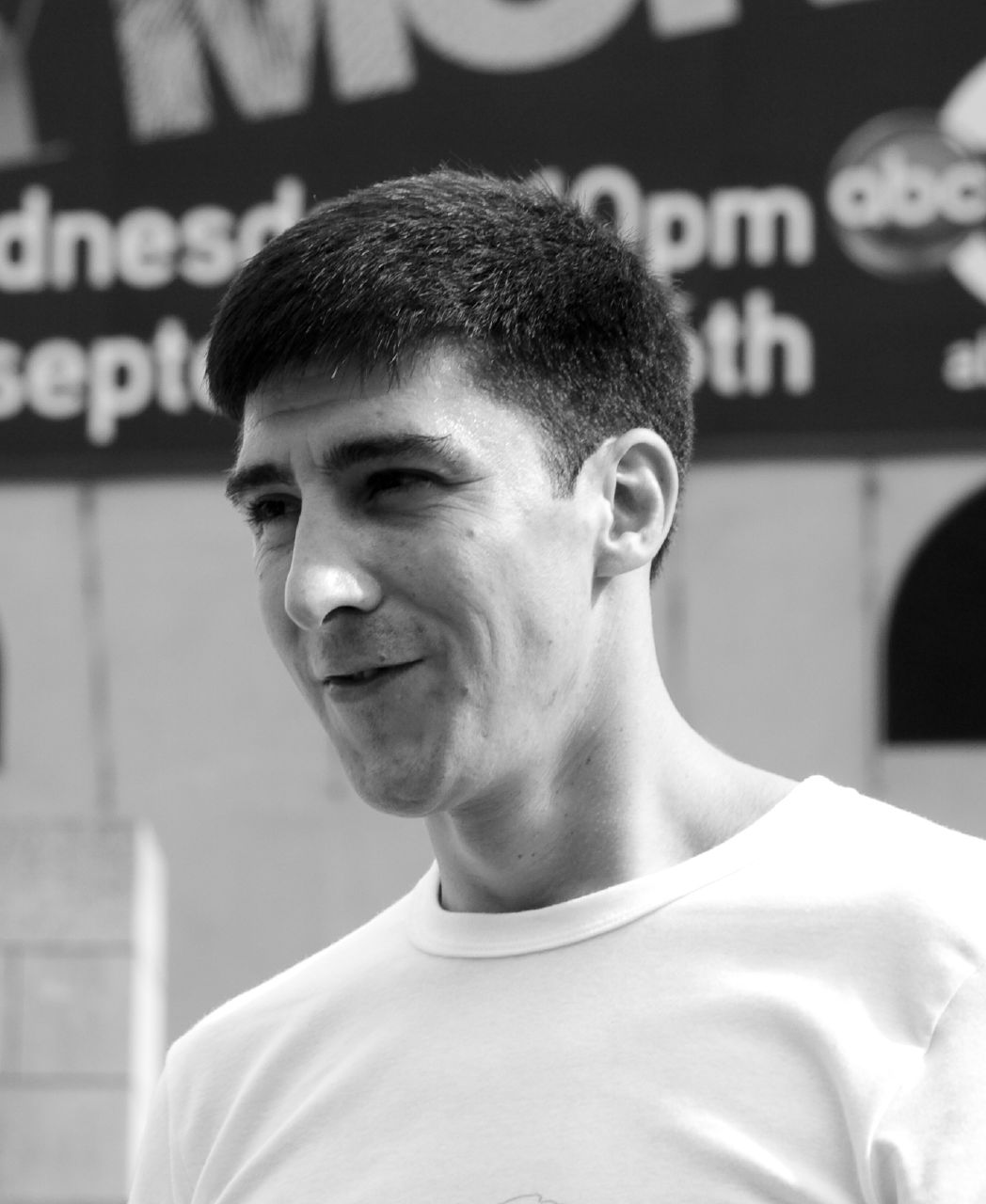
David Belle (founder of parkour) provided the motion capture for Hakon.

Aiden, a 20 year old survivor of the Fall and a Pilgrim—a brave traveler who delivers goods and information between settlements—has been making his way to the city of Villedor. After being told by Spike how to contact a man named Dylan who knows the whereabouts of Vincent Waltz, a doctor who experimented on Aiden and his sister Mia when they were children to find a cure for THV, but were separated due to a terrible incident in the lab, Aiden contacts Dylan over the radio & meets with him. However, Aiden is attacked & bitten by a Volatile and becomes infected with THV. After saving Dylan from a group of Renegades, Dylan gives Aiden a working GRE electronic key, warning him that if Waltz were to get his hands on it, Villedor would be doomed. He then instructs Aiden to take the key to the "Fish Eye", and find a woman named Lawan. Dylan proceeds to open a fan duct, and sends Aiden through before shutting & locking it. Aiden watches in horror as Waltz executes Dylan and then proceeds to chase Aiden, making his way further into Villedor.

Aiden eventually finds his way to the Bazaar, a large settlement in old Villedor run by the independent Survivors. Aiden is nearly killed due to his lack of a biomarker—an electronic device that tracks the progression of THV—but is saved by Hakon, a former Nightrunner. Hakon explains that tensions in Villedor are high due to the recent murder of the Peacekeepers' leader, Lucas. The Peacekeepers believe that the survivors of the Bazaar are responsible due to their hatred of the Peacekeepers, and risk of a war between the two factions seems imminent. Hakon helps Aiden obtain a biomarker and tries to smuggle him into Villedor's Central Loop, where the Fish Eye is located. Players can choose to side with either the Bazaar's leaders, Carl and Sophie, or with Aitor, a high ranking officer of the Peacekeepers. Both of them promise Aiden that they will smuggle him into the Central District as both sides go to war.

Regardless of who Aiden sides with, he discovers that Hakon was the one who killed Lucas, on Waltz's orders. If Aiden to hels Hakon after he is shot, Aiden comes across a person who is attempting to kill him, and discovers the person is a woman. After making his way to an abandoned GRE tunnel, Aiden is met by Aitor, who may be either angry or friendly depending on the player's choices. Waltz suddenly appears in the tunnel & confronts Aiden, demonstrating superhuman abilities as he steals the GRE key from him, and kills all of the Peacekeepers except for Aitor. Aiden pursues Waltz to an abandoned car factory, where he uses the key to activate a console before the mysterious woman intervenes, incapacitating Waltz long enough for Aiden to recover the key and escape. The woman reveals herself to be Lawan, and explains that she seeks revenge against Waltz because she was also one of his test subjects. She also reveals that Lucas was murdered by Waltz after originally finding the GRE key.

With the key, Aiden and Lawan are able to enter the Central district, where they see electricity suddenly be restored to the city due to Waltz's use of the key. Aiden then meets with the commander of the Peacekeepers, Jack Matt, as well as the former leader of the now defunct Nightrunner group, Frank. They both task Aiden with reactivating the radio antenna atop Villedor's highest skyscraper so that they can broadcast messages to the rest of Villedor and the settlements beyond, and in return they can help Aiden with finding a surviving GRE doctor so that he can access the GRE database.

After reactivating the tower, Aiden learns that the GRE doctor's identity is Dr. Veronika Ryan, a Bazaar resident. Aiden returns to the Bazaar and finds Veronika, who is on the run from the Renegades. Together, they head to a GRE facility called the Observatory, which had originally been inaccessible due to being bombarded by the toxic chemical THV Genmod. At the observatory Veronica claims they can find the location of a GRE database. After accessing the database, Aiden does not find any information to help his search for Mia, but discovers that Waltz reactivating Villedor's power plant also reactivated a GRE failsafe protocol, which initiates missile bombardments to destroy Villedor. Waltz arrives to take the key, and while fighting him, Aiden loses control of his THV infection and kills Veronika just as a missile destroys the Observatory, allowing Waltz to escape with the key.

Lawan pulls Aiden from the debris, and he warns her that Waltz's experiments on him means he will inevitably fully succumb to the infection. After a deal between the Survivors, Peacekeepers, and Renegades goes horribly wrong, Aiden has a choice to either stay & help Frank, or go after a getaway van, containing members of the Renegades. Either way, once he finishes his tasks, Aiden meets Colonel Williams, leader of the Renegades & former military colonel of Villedor. Williams claims he originally stopped the missile bombardments from destroying Villedor, but Waltz has resumed them, which resulted in Waltz being able to take Williams' men. Not wanting to see Villedor destroyed, Williams tells Aiden to head for the X13 lab to confront Waltz and stop the missiles. Aiden and Lawan enter the complex and are shocked to find that X13 was supposed to be a survival shelter for GRE officials, with massive stockpiles of food, water, and basic necessities. Lawan rescues Hakon after he tries to protect them from Waltz's Renegades, leaving Aiden to continue alone. As he journeys through X13, he realizes it is the same facility where he was experimented on.

Aiden confronts Waltz, who reveals that Aiden's memories were suppressed, and that Mia is actually Waltz's daughter, who he has been trying to cure of an aggressive strain of THV, for the past 15 years since the military incident. Waltz refuses to abort the missile launches, as that would require shutting down X13, whose facilities are necessary to cure Mia, forcing Aiden to battle him. Aiden finally manages to defeat Waltz, who succumbs to his wounds, but the GRE key is destroyed in the fighting. Lawan then tells Aiden she plans to detonate explosives to destroy the missiles before they can launch, which will destroy X13 and possibly herself. Aiden must choose to either try and save Mia, or save Lawan.

- If Aiden goes to save Lawan, he takes her out of X13. However, Aiden fails to stop the missile strike, which destroys Villedor and kills a majority of the population. Aiden then leaves the city due to his infection, continuing his journey as a Pilgrim. Depending on the player's choices during the game, Hakon may leave the city with him.
- If Aiden goes to save Mia, he takes her out of X13. X13 is destroyed in the explosion and the city is spared from destruction. Mia dies shortly after due to her weakened condition and is buried by Aiden. Meanwhile, Villedor falls under the control of the faction Aiden supported the most. However, Aiden ultimately decides to leave Villedor due to his infection and continues his journey as a Pilgrim. Depending on the player's choices during the game, Hakon may save Lawan from X13's destruction and Lawan may leave the city with Aiden.

== Development ==
Dying Light 2 was developed and published by Techland. The team intended to invoke a sense of loss and dread, and also show that humanity was on the edge of extinction. To show the fragility of humanity, the team introduced several layers to the City, in which the temporary structures are built on top of the ruins of the old buildings to accommodate humans, whereas permanent structures and concrete ground are occupied by massive hordes of zombies. When creating the city, the team utilized an internal technology named CityBuilder, which can assemble different building parts like ledges and windows with minimal input from the level designers. The technology enabled the team to create and change the city design quickly. The team created a new engine named C-Engine to power the game.

The game placed a significantly larger emphasis on narrative when compared with its predecessor. The team approached Chris Avellone to help write the game's story which is reactive to players' choices. The team felt that they had developed an open city, but they wanted the narrative to share the same level of agency. The game was described as a "narrative sandbox" in which every choice has "genuine" consequences according to Avellone. After players make certain choices, the game space will change. The game's story features a more serious tone when compared with the first game. To make the world feel believable and authentic, the team took inspiration from real-world issues and political ideologies and had to drop gameplay ideas that were deemed too unrealistic. Ciszewski added that in each playthrough, players will "lose at least 25 percent of the content".

The story focuses on a new, modern "Dark Ages" for humanity, which enables the story to convey themes such as betrayal, infidelity, and intrigue. The team was confident about the game's gameplay, though they felt that they needed additional help when designing the game's narrative. Therefore, the team recruited Avellone as well as writers who worked on The Witcher 3: Wild Hunt, a game widely praised for its writing and story. The narrative design prompts players to care about the non-playable characters and encourages players to be more sensitive about their presence and needs. Zombies, instead of being the main enemy like in the last game, become a narrative device that pressurize other non-playable characters to induce interesting drama and themes. The game features hostile human enemies more heavily when compared with the first game, as the team was inspired by works including The Walking Dead and Game of Thrones, in which living humans are equally dangerous. The team developed a life cycle for zombies in the game. Newly bitten zombies are called Viral, which are fast and dangerous enemies whose humanity still remain. They would become Biters, which are described as "regular zombies". When Biters are exposed to UV light for a long period of time, they devolved into Degenerates, which are degenerating zombies with flesh falling off from them.

Due to sexual misconduct allegations made against Chris Avellone in June 2020, Techland and Avellone agreed to terminate his involvement with Dying Light 2.

== Release ==
The game was announced at E3 2018 during the Xbox press conference by Avellone as Dying Light 2 with a 6 minute demo. At Xbox's E3 2019 press conference, the game was shown again, with an early 2020 release window. Square Enix distributes the game and provided marketing efforts in North America. In January 2020, Techland announced that the game would be delayed out of its 2020 window to allow additional development time, with no new release date given at the time. In May 2021, a digital event was held and a 7 December 2021 release date was revealed, alongside the game's title adding the subtitle of Stay Human. In September 2021, the game was delayed to 4 February 2022.

On 23 September 2021, a cloud version of Dying Light 2 was confirmed for the Nintendo Switch console during a Nintendo Direct presentation, set to release on the same day as the other platforms. This version of the game was delayed and Techland announced that it would be released "within six months" after its initial launch on other platforms, but as of early 2026, it has yet to be released.

Techland promised to support the game with downloadable content and updates for at least five years after the game's launch. A New Game Plus mode was added in April 2022. The first story downloadable content, Bloody Ties, which introduced a Roman gladiator-style arena, was released on 19 November 2022. On 18 April 2024, Techland introduced Nightmare Mode as the highest difficulty setting for Dying Light 2. This mode was first announced in September 2023 with a roadmap of future additions. On 20 August 2024 at Gamescom 2024, Techland revealed a new Dying Light game called Dying Light: The Beast, featuring the return of Kyle Crane, the protagonist of the first game. The Beast has quickly become the most-wishlisted game in the Dying Light franchise, surpassing one million wishlists just ten weeks after its announcement. Techland will be offering The Beast at no extra cost to current owners of the Dying Light 2 Ultimate Edition, delivering a full standalone instead of the planned second story downloadable content.

== Reception ==
=== Critical reception ===
Reception

Aggregate score
Aggregator	Score
Metacritic	PC: 77/100; PS5: 76/100; XSXS: 76/100

Review scores
Publication	Score
Destructoid	7.5/10
Easy Allies	7/10
Electronic Gaming Monthly	3/5
Game Informer	9.5/10
GameRevolution	6.5/10
GameSpot	6/10
GamesRadar+	3.5/5
Hardcore Gamer	3.5/5
IGN	7/10
Jeuxvideo.com	17/20
PC Gamer (US)	84/100
PCGamesN	6/10
Push Square	7/10
Shacknews	7/10
VG247	4/5
VideoGamer.com	7/10

Dying Light 2 received "generally favorable" reviews, according to review aggregator website Metacritic.

Kotaku praised the parkour system, writing that it expanded upon its predecessor in meaningful ways, "Dying Light 2 feels as if Techland realized how the first game's movement made it stand out from so many other zombie games, and focused on building it up more. The end result is one of the best parkour systems I've ever seen in a game". Ars Technica criticized the story, specifically the voice acting and writing, "[Dying Light 2]'s voice acting is perhaps the worst I've heard in a video game of this scale... And they're chained to a script that consists of awkwardly translated phrases, along with massive leaps in logic and wartime strategy". While criticizing the narrative's exposition-heavy dialogue, Polygon enjoyed the melee combat, saying that "With a smartly balanced fatigue meter governing attacks and movements, Dying Light 2 makes me think about, and use, all the tactics available to me, especially in boss and sub-boss fights". Eurogamer liked how the open world integrated with the parkour gameplay, "The first-person parkour is simply brilliant, its integration into a vast, dense open world simply astonishing, and the act of getting from A to B is an absolute thrill". Rock Paper Shotgun felt the changes to nighttime made it less dangerous and more routine "Come night, you simply avoid the horde by sticking to the rooftops... Interiors are barebones stealth sections, with all too obvious routes to sneak by sleepers... The end result is that you spend a lot of the game being shepherded towards the least interesting place at any given time".

A 'day-one' patch was released along with the digital version of the game, which fixes more than 1000 known issues with the game.

=== Sales ===
The retail version of the game debuted at No. 2 on the UK boxed chart, only behind Pokémon Legends: Arceus. It had a strong launch on Steam, with its all-time player peak count being nearly four times more than the first game 24 hours after the game's release. According to the NPD Group, the physical version of the game was also the fourth best-selling video game in the US in February 2022. The game attracted 3 million players during its first week of release. In February 2022, the game sold 5 million units.

The PlayStation 4 version of Dying Light 2 was the second bestselling retail game during its first week of release in Japan, with 24,160 physical copies being sold. The PlayStation 5 version sold 12,891 physical copies in Japan throughout the same week, making it the fourth bestselling retail game of the week in the country.
