= Hellraid =

- Developer: Techland
- Publisher: Techland
- Producer: Marcin Kruczkiewicz
- Composer: Paweł Błaszczak
- Engine: Chrome Engine 6
- Platforms: Microsoft Windows; PlayStation 4 Xbox One
- Genres: Action, hack and slash
- Modes: Single-player, multiplayer

Hellraid was a video game in development by Techland. It was scheduled to be released for Microsoft Windows, PlayStation 4 and Xbox One in 2015, but has been put on hold since then. A mobile spin-off titled Hellraid: The Escape was published in 2014.

== Gameplay ==
Hellraid was to feature both co-operative and single-player modes, as well as an online mode called 'Game Master'. The game was to be played from a first-person perspective and to feature randomly generated content. The co-op multiplayer mode was announced to be able to feature up to four players.

== Development ==
The game was originally going to be a mod for Dead Island, which was also developed by Techland, before it became an individual game. The game's working title was Project Hell.

The game was first revealed in a press release on April 29, 2013. The press release stated that the game would be released in 2013. The game was described as mixing "the best aspects of" Dead Island and The Elder Scrolls as well as a spiritual successor to the 1990s fantasy first-person shooter games such as Hexen and Witchaven.

In May 2014, Hellraid was delayed to allow it to be rebuilt on Techland's latest version of their in-house engine, Chrome Engine 6. The company also announced that it was transitioning Hellraid to the PlayStation 4 and Xbox One to be released as a digital-only game.

In May 2015, Techland announced that the company has put the development of Hellraid on hold as the game failed to meet the company's expectation. Techland decided to focus on expanding the universe of Dying Light, which was also developed by Techland and was released in January 2015.

In July 2020, Techland released "Dying Light: Hellraid", a DLC pack for the game Dying Light, inspired by Hellraid. Its final update was released in 2022.

== Hellraid: The Escape ==
Hellraid: The Escape is a video game set within the Hellraid universe. Unlike Hellraid, it puts emphasis on puzzle-solving instead of action. It was developed by Shortbreak Studios with assistance from Techland and was released on iOS platform on May 15, 2014. The game was powered by Epic Games' Unreal Engine.

Upon release, the game received generally positive reviews. Aggregating review websites Metacritic have the game 75/100. TouchArcade gave the game a 4.5/5, calling it "a great experience on iOS and a rather successful combination of first-person exploration and puzzle elements." No in-apps purchase is available in the game and all post-launch content will be free to players.
