= Techland =

Polish video game developer and publisher

Techland S.A.
- Type: Subsidiary
- Industry: Video games
- Founded: 1991; 35 years ago
- Founder: Paweł Marchewka
- Headquarters: Wrocław, Poland
- Number of locations: 3 (2016)
- Area served: Worldwide
- Key people: Paweł Marchewka (CEO); Adrian Ciszewski (CCO); Oleg Klapovskiy (CPO); Karol Bach (COO & CFO)
- Products: Call of Juarez series (2006–2013); Dead Island series (2011–2013); Dying Light series (2015-2025)
- Revenue: 182.7M PLN (2018)
- Total equity: 101M PLN (2018)
- Number of employees: 550+ (2024)
- Parent: Tencent (majority stake, 2024–present)
- Website: techland.net

Techland S.A. is a Polish video game developer and publisher founded in 1991 by Paweł Marchewka. It developed Call of Juarez (2006) and its prequel Call of Juarez: Bound in Blood (2009), as well as Dead Island (2011) and the Dying Light series. The company is headquartered in Wrocław in western Poland and has offices in Wrocław and Warsaw.

== History ==
The company was founded in 1991 by Paweł Marchewka. Marchewka, born in 1973 in Ostrów Wielkopolski, displayed an interest in video games since his early childhood. In his final years of high school, together with his friends, he started distributing video games to different shops across Poland.

The endeavour was successful enough that, in 1991, when Poland introduced changes to its intellectual property laws, he pivoted to officially founding Techland. Initially, the company focused on translating foreign programs and publishing them on the Polish market. In 1993, Techland began producing its own software: Dictionaries, translators, computer-games.

Techland started as a distributor of computer software and created Prawo Krwi, the first game developed in-house, in 1995. Techland released the sci-fi-themed first-person-shooter Chrome in 2003. A prequel titled Chrome: Specforce was released in 2005. Techland has also developed driving games including rally simulation games Xpand Rally and Xpand Rally Xtreme and Volkswagen-licensed GTI-Racing (2006).

In 2011, Techland released open world survival horror game Dead Island. Its sequel, Dead Island: Riptide appeared in 2013. In August 2013, the company launched a branch in Vancouver, Canada, under the name Digital Scapes Studios.

In 2015, Techland released Dying Light, a first-person survival horror game for the PlayStation 4, Xbox One, and Microsoft Windows. An expansion for the game, Dying Light: The Following, was released in 2016. Techland's first title as a game publisher was Torment: Tides of Numenera, released in 2017. In 2018, Call of Juarez: The Cartel and Call of Juarez: Gunslinger were both delisted from Steam, Xbox Live, and PlayStation Network citing a publishing dispute with Ubisoft. Call of Juarez: Gunslinger returned to those storefronts in April 2018 with Techland as the sole publisher.

In July 2021 Techland sold Digital Scapes Studios to CD Projekt, another Polish developer, who proceeded to rename it to CD Projekt Red Vancouver. They also celebrated the company's 30th anniversary that December with a series of discounts for its clients. In 2022, Techland released the open world survival horror game Dying Light 2: Stay Human, a sequel to Dying Light.

In July 2023, Tencent announced that it would become the company's majority shareholder. Despite acquiring a 67% stake in the company for a reported US$1.6 billion, the Polish developer is to maintain creative independence and control over its brands.

On January 10, 2024, it was reported that Tencent had completed the acquisition of a controlling stake in Techland.

== Technology ==
Techland's proprietary Chrome Engine of 2003 has been developed further. ChromeEngine 4 was completed in 2006 and provided support for the PlayStation 3. Techland is using its own engine, known as C-Engine. Previously, Techland's engine was called Chrome Engine, but the C-Engine technology is all new. According to the lead designer of the company, Tymon Smektała: “we agreed that this is what we want to do and we want to create games with highly detailed graphics so that you can truly immerse yourself in this world. We knew that to achieve this, we had to create a new engine, a new technology”.

One of the main advantage of the technology is said to be the best possible support of ray tracing (and NVIDIA DLSS) and better use of multi-core processors.

=== Chrome Engine 1 ===
First release of the engine used in Chrome.

=== Chrome Engine 2 ===
Improved version of engine enhanced with support for DirectX 9.0.

=== Chrome Engine 3 ===
This version of the engine underwent significant modifications. DirectX 9.0c and DirectX 10 support, HDR, shaders and bump mapping were implemented.

=== Chrome Engine 4 ===
The fourth iteration of the Chrome Engine that was introduced with Call of Juarez: Bound in Blood. Supports DirectX 9 only.

=== Chrome Engine 5 ===
This version debuted with Call of Juarez: The Cartel, Call of Juarez: Gunslinger and Dead Island. This version was primarily used between 2011–2013.

=== Chrome Engine 6 ===
Version used since 2013 to develop Dying Light and DLC for Dying Light Hellraid.

== Upcoming projects ==
Techland is currently involved in multiple projects, including the development of a highly anticipated AAA open-world fantasy RPG, which the studio has described as its biggest project to date. In addition to this, the studio continues to provide ongoing post-launch support for Dying Light 2, ensuring a steady stream of updates and content for the game.
