= List of Xbox Series X and Series S games =

The following is a list of games that have been announced for release or released on the Xbox Series X and Xbox Series S. Both were released on November 10, 2020.

The Xbox Series X and Series S have full backward compatibility with Xbox One games as well as several Xbox 360 and original Xbox games that were supported on the Xbox One, excluding those that use Kinect. Most Xbox One games that also have an Xbox Series X/S version will automatically download the Xbox Series X/S version for the system via Microsoft's "Smart Delivery" program, without an additional purchase for both physical and digital game purchases. Physical games are sold on Blu-ray and digital games can be purchased through the Microsoft Store. This list excludes backward compatible games.

There are currently 985 games on this list. (Note: This number is always up to date by this script.)

Key					
XP Cross-play	PA Xbox Play Anywhere	SD Supports Microsoft Smart Delivery	EN Xbox One version can be upgraded to an enhanced Xbox Series X and Series S version (Note: Excludes those already within the Smart Delivery program)	OP Optimized for Xbox Series X and Series S	XD Disc to Digital Licensing on XBOX

Title	Genre(s)	Developer(s)	Publisher(s)	Release date (Note: Release based availability for Xbox Series X and Series S, if previously released)			Addons	Ref.
Title	Genre(s)	Developer(s)	Publisher(s)	JP	NA	PAL	Addons	Ref.
007 First Light	Action-adventure	IO Interactive	IO Interactive	May 27, 2026	May 27, 2026	May 27, 2026	PA	
1000xResist	Adventure	Sunset Visitor	Fellow Traveller Games	Nov 4, 2025	Nov 4, 2025	Nov 4, 2025	PA	
1f y0u're a gh0st ca11 me here!	Action-adventure	Furoshiki Lab.	Kemco	Jun 5, 2025	Jun 5, 2025	Jun 5, 2025	SD OP	
2XKO	Fighting	Riot Games	Riot Games	Jan 20, 2026	Jan 20, 2026	Jan 20, 2026		
33 Immortals	Action; Roguelike	Thunder Lotus Games	Thunder Lotus Games	Jun 10, 2026	Jun 10, 2026	Jun 10, 2026		
3 out of 10: Season One	Action-adventure; Puzzle	Terrible Posture Games, Inc.	Terrible Posture Games, Inc.	Mar 3, 2021	Mar 3, 2021	Mar 3, 2021	SD OP	
3xtinction	Shooter game	2BAD Games	2BAD Games	Sep 3, 2024	Sep 3, 2024	Sep 3, 2024		
63 Days	Strategy	Destructive Creations	Destructive Creations	Sep 26, 2024	Sep 26, 2024	Sep 26, 2024	SD OP	
7 Days to Die	Survival horror	The Fun Pimps	The Fun Pimps	Unreleased	Jul 25, 2024	Jul 25, 2024		
AAA Dynamic Scenes	Puzzle	Somequest	We Dig Games	Jun 6, 2025	Jun 6, 2025	Jun 6, 2025	SD OP	
Abathor	Platformer; Hack and slash; Action	Pow Pixel Games	Jandusoft	Jul 25, 2024	Jul 25, 2024	Jul 25, 2024	SD PA OP	
Absolum	Beat'em up; Roguelike	Guard Crush Games; Supamonks	Dotemu	Mar 25, 2026	Mar 25, 2026	Mar 25, 2026	SD OP	
ACA 2 Neo Geo: The King of Fighters '98	Fighting	SNK	Hamster Corporation	Feb 27, 2025	Feb 27, 2025	Feb 27, 2025		
Accolade Sports Collection	Sports	QUByte Interactive	QUByte Interactive; Atari	Jan 30, 2025	Jan 30, 2025	Jan 30, 2025	SD OP	
Ace Combat 8: Wings of Theve	Air combat simulation	Bandai Namco Aces	Bandai Namco Entertainment	Oct 2, 2026	Oct 2, 2026	Oct 2, 2026		
The Adventures of Elliot: The Millennium Tales	Action role-playing	Square Enix; Claytechworks	Square Enix	Jun 18, 2026	Jun 18, 2026	Jun 18, 2026		
Aero the Acro-Bat	Platform	Sunsoft	Ratalaika Games	Aug 2, 2024	Aug 2, 2024	Aug 2, 2024	SD OP	
Aero the Acro-Bat 2	Platform	Sunsoft	Ratalaika Games	Sep 6, 2024	Sep 6, 2024	Sep 6, 2024	SD OP	
Aero The Acro-Bat: Rascal Rival Revenge	Platform	Sunsoft	Ratalaika Games	Nov 1, 2024	Nov 1, 2024	Nov 1, 2024	SD OP	
Aeterna Noctis	Metroidvania	Aeternum Game Studios	Aeternum Game Studios	Unreleased	Dec 15, 2021	Dec 15, 2021		
AEW Fight Forever	Sports	Yuke's	AEW Games	Jun 29, 2023	Jun 29, 2023	Jun 29, 2023	SD OP	
AFL 23	Sports	Big Ant Studios	Nacon	Sep 22, 2023	Sep 22, 2023	Sep 22, 2023		
AFL 26	Sports	Big Ant Studios	Nacon	May 8, 2025	May 8, 2025	May 8, 2025	SD OP	
Afterlove EP	Visual novel	Pikselnesia	Fellow Traveller Games	Feb 14, 2025	Feb 14, 2025	Feb 14, 2025		
Against the Storm	City-building	Eremite Games	Hooded Horse	Jun 26, 2025	Jun 26, 2025	Jun 26, 2025		
Age of Empires II: Definitive Edition	Real-time strategy	World's Edge; Forgotten Empires	Xbox Game Studios	Jan 31, 2023	Jan 31, 2023	Jan 31, 2023		
Age of Empires IV: Anniversary Edition	Real-time strategy	Relic Entertainment; World's Edge	Xbox Game Studios	Aug 22, 2023	Aug 22, 2023	Aug 22, 2023		
Age of Mythology: Retold	Real-time strategy	World's Edge; Forgotten Empires	Xbox Game Studios	Sep 4, 2024	Sep 4, 2024	Sep 4, 2024	PA	
Age of Wonders 4	Turn-based strategy	Triumph Studios	Paradox Interactive	Unreleased	May 2, 2023	May 2, 2023		
Ailment & Endurance Bundle	Action-adventure	Ivan Panasenko	EpiXR Games	Feb 17, 2021	Feb 17, 2021	Feb 17, 2021	SD OP	
AirportSim	Simulation	MS GAMES, MK STUDIOS	Iceberg Interactivem	Unreleased	Aug 1, 2024	Aug 1, 2024		
Air Twister	Rail shooter	YS Net	ININ Games	Nov 10, 2023	Nov 10, 2023	Nov 10, 2023		
Alan Wake Remastered	Action-adventure	Remedy Entertainment	Epic Games Publishing	Oct 5, 2021	Oct 5, 2021	Oct 5, 2021		
Alan Wake 2	Action-adventure	Remedy Entertainment	Epic Games Publishing	Oct 27, 2023	Oct 27, 2023	Oct 27, 2023		
Albion Online	MMORPG	Sandbox Interactive	Sandbox Interactive	Apr 21, 2026	Apr 21, 2026	Apr 21, 2026		
Alex Kidd in Miracle World DX	Platform	Jankenteam	Merge Games	Jun 22, 2021	Jun 22, 2021	Jun 22, 2021		
Alfred Hitchcock – Vertigo	Adventure	Pendulo Studios	Microids	Unreleased	Oct 4, 2022	Sep 27, 2022		
Aliens: Fireteam Elite	Action-adventure; third-person shooter	Cold Iron Studios	20th Century Games	Aug 24, 2021	Aug 24, 2021	Aug 24, 2021		
Alien Hominid HD	Run and gun	The Behemoth	The Behemoth	Nov 1, 2023	Nov 1, 2023	Nov 1, 2023	SD OP	
Alien Hominid Invasion	Run and gun	The Behemoth	The Behemoth	Nov 1, 2023	Nov 1, 2023	Nov 1, 2023	SD OP	
Alone in the Dark	Survival horror	Pieces Interactive	THQ Nordic	Mar 20, 2024	Mar 20, 2024	Mar 20, 2024		
Amnesia: The Bunker	Survival horror	Frictional Games	Frictional Games	Jun 6, 2023	Jun 6, 2023	Jun 6, 2023	SD PA OP	
Among Us	Party; social deduction	Innersloth	Innersloth	Unreleased	Dec 14, 2021	Dec 14, 2021	SD	
The Anacrusis	Tactical shooter	Stray Bombay Company	Stray Bombay Company	TBA	TBA	TBA		
An Airport for Aliens Currently Run by Dogs	Adventure	Strange Scaffold	Strange Scaffold	May 25, 2021	May 25, 2021	May 25, 2021		
Achilles: Legends Untold	Action role-playing	Dark Point Games	Dark Point Games	Nov 2, 2023	Nov 2, 2023	Nov 2, 2023		
Animal Well	Metroidvania; puzzle	Shared Memory	Bigmode	Oct 19, 2024	Oct 19, 2024	Oct 19, 2024		
Anno 1800	Real-time strategy	Blue Byte	Ubisoft	Mar 16, 2023	Mar 16, 2023	Mar 16, 2023		
Anodyne 2: Return to Dust	Action-adventure	Analgesic Productions	Ratalatika Games	Unreleased	Feb 18, 2021	Feb 18, 2021	SD OP	
Another Crab's Treasure	Action-adventure	Aggro Crab	Aggro Crab	Apr 25, 2024	Apr 25, 2024	Apr 25, 2024	PA SD OP	
Another Dawn	Action-adventure; Shooter	KR Games	KR Games	Jan 29, 2021	Jan 29, 2021	Jan 29, 2021	SD OP	
Apex Legends	Action-adventure; Shooter	Respawn Entertainment	Electronic Arts	Mar 29, 2022	Mar 29, 2022	Mar 29, 2022	SD XP	
Aphelion	Action-adventure	Don't Nod	Don't Nod	Apr 28, 2026	Apr 28, 2026	Apr 28, 2026		
Apsulov: End of Gods	Horror	Angry Demon Studios	Digerati Distribution	Sep 2, 2021	Sep 2, 2021	Sep 2, 2021		
A Quiet Place: The Road Ahead	Survival horror	Stormind Games	Saber Interactive	Oct 17, 2024	Oct 17, 2024	Oct 17, 2024		
Arcade Archives 2: Adventure Canoe	Action	Taito	Hamster Corporation	Feb 19, 2026	Feb 19, 2026	Feb 19, 2026		
Arcade Archives 2: Air Combat 22	Air combat simulation	Namco	Hamster Corporation	Jul 3, 2025	Jul 3, 2025	Jul 3, 2025		
Arcade Archives 2: Aqua Jet	Racing	Namco	Hamster Corporation	Aug 14, 2025	Aug 14, 2025	Aug 14, 2025		
Arcade Archives 2: Battlantis	Fixed shooter	Konami	Hamster Corporation	Oct 9, 2025	Oct 9, 2025	Oct 9, 2025		
Arcade Archives 2: Bermuda Triangle	Scrolling shooter	SNK	Hamster Corporation	Dec 4, 2025	Dec 4, 2025	Dec 4, 2025		
Arcade Archives 2: Bomb Bee	Block breaker; Video pinball	Namco	Hamster Corporation	Nov 20, 2025	Nov 20, 2025	Nov 20, 2025		
Arcade Archives 2: Bomb Jack Twin	Platform	NMK	Hamster Corporation	Jan 15, 2026	Jan 15, 2026	Jan 15, 2026		
Arcade Archives 2: Ridge Racer	Racing	Namco	Hamster Corporation	Jun 5, 2025	Jun 5, 2025	Jun 5, 2025		
Arcade Paradise	Business simulation; Action	Nosebleed Interactive	Wired Productions	Aug 11, 2022	Aug 11, 2022	Aug 11, 2022	SD PA OP	
ARC Raiders	Third-person shooter	Embark Studios	Embark Studios	Oct 30, 2025	Oct 30, 2025	Oct 30, 2025		
Arctic Awakening	Adventure	GoldFire Studios	GoldFire Studios	2022	2022	2022		
Ark 2	Action-adventure; survival	Studio Wildcard	Studio Wildcard	2028	2028	2028	OP	
Ark: Survival Ascended	MMORPG; Action-adventure; Survival	Studio Wildcard	Snail Games	Nov 21, 2023	Nov 21, 2023	Nov 21, 2023	PA	
Arrest of a Stone Buddha	Shooter	Yeo	Yeo	Unreleased	May 14, 2021	May 14, 2021		
The Artful Escape	Platform	Beethoven & Dinosaur	Annapurna Interactive	Sep 9, 2021	Sep 9, 2021	Sep 9, 2021		
Art of Rally	Racing	Funselektor Labs	Funselektor Labs	Aug 12, 2021	Aug 12, 2021	Aug 12, 2021		
Arzette: The Jewel of Faramore	Adventure	Seedy Eye Software	Limited Run Games	Unreleased	Feb 14, 2024	Feb 14, 2024		
The Ascent	Action role-playing	Neon Giant	Curve Digital	Jul 29, 2021	Jul 29, 2021	Jul 29, 2021	SD OP	
As Dusk Falls	Adventure	Interior Night	Xbox Game Studios	July 19, 2022	July 19, 2022	July 19, 2022	XP PA SD OP	
A Space for the Unbound	Adventure	Mojiken Studio	Toge Productions; Chorus Worldwide	Jan 19, 2023	Jan 19, 2023	Jan 19, 2023		
Asphalt Legends	Racing	Gameloft Barcelona	Gameloft	Aug 31, 2021	Aug 31, 2021	Aug 31, 2021	XP SD OP	
Assassin's Creed Black Flag Resynced	Action-adventure	Ubisoft Singapore	Ubisoft	Jul 9, 2026	Jul 9, 2026	Jul 9, 2026		
Assassin's Creed Mirage	Action role-playing game	Ubisoft Bordeaux	Ubisoft	Oct 5, 2023	Oct 5, 2023	Oct 5, 2023		
Assassin's Creed Shadows	Action role-playing game	Ubisoft Quebec	Ubisoft	Mar 20, 2025	Mar 20, 2025	Mar 20, 2025		
Assassin's Creed Valhalla	Action role-playing game	Ubisoft Montreal	Ubisoft	Nov 10, 2020	Nov 10, 2020	Nov 10, 2020	SD OP	
Assetto Corsa Competizione	Racing	Kunos Simulazioni	505 Games	Feb 24, 2022	Feb 24, 2022	Feb 24, 2022		
Asterigos: Curse of the Stars	Hack and slash	Acme Gamestudio	TinyBuild	Oct 11, 2022	Oct 11, 2022	Oct 11, 2022	SD OP	
Astrea: Six-Sided Oracles	Digital tabletop game	Little Leo Games	Akupara Games	Sep 26, 2024	Sep 26, 2024	Sep 26, 2024	SD OP	
Astria Ascending	Role-playing	Artisan Studios	Dear Villagers	Sep 30, 2021	Sep 30, 2021	Sep 30, 2021		
Atari 50: The Anniversary Celebration	Various	Digital Eclipse	Atari	Nov 11, 2022	Nov 11, 2022	Nov 11, 2022		
Atelier Yumia: The Alchemist of Memories & the Envisioned Land	Role-playing	Gust	Koei Tecmo	Mar 21, 2025	Mar 21, 2025	Mar 21, 2025		
Atlas Fallen	Action role-playing	Deck13 Interactive	Focus Entertainment	Aug 10, 2023	Aug 10, 2023	Aug 10, 2023		
Atomic Heart	Action role-playing; First-person shooter	Mundfish	Mundfish	Feb 21, 2023	Feb 21, 2023	Feb 21, 2023		
Avatar: Frontiers of Pandora	Action-adventure	Massive Entertainment	Ubisoft	Dec 7, 2023	Dec 7, 2023	Dec 7, 2023		
Marvel's Avengers	Action-adventure	Crystal Dynamics	Square Enix	Mar 18, 2021	Mar 18, 2021	Mar 18, 2021	SD OP	
Avowed	Action role-playing	Obsidian Entertainment	Xbox Game Studios	Feb 18, 2025	Feb 18, 2025	Feb 18, 2025	OP	
Away: The Survival Series	Action-adventure; Survival	Breaking Walls	Breaking Walls	Jun 1, 2023	Jun 1, 2023	Jun 1, 2023		
Aztech: Forgotten Gods	Action-adventure	Lienzo	Lienzo	Mar 10, 2022	Mar 10, 2022	Mar 10, 2022		
Back 4 Blood	First-person shooter; Survival horror	Turtle Rock Studios	WB Games	Oct 12, 2021	Oct 12, 2021	Oct 12, 2021		
Backfirewall	Adventure; puzzle	Naraven Games	All in! Games	Jan 30, 2023	Jan 30, 2023	Jan 30, 2023		
Backpack Hero	Roguelite	Jaspel	Jaspel	Jun 11, 2024	Jun 11, 2024	Jun 11, 2024		
Bad End Theater	Visual novel	NomnomNami	Serenity Forge	Jul 10, 2025	Jul 10, 2025	Jul 10, 2025	SD PA OP	
Balan Wonderworld	Platform	Balan Company; Arzest	Square Enix	Mar 26, 2021	Mar 26, 2021	Mar 26, 2021	SD OP	
Balatro	Roguelike deck-building	LocalThunk	Playstack	Feb 20, 2024	Feb 20, 2024	Feb 20, 2024		
Ball x Pit	Action	Kenny Sun	Devolver Digital	Oct 15, 2025	Oct 15, 2025	Oct 15, 2025		
Banishers: Ghosts of New Eden	Action role-playing	Don't Nod	Focus Entertainment	Feb 13, 2024	Feb 13, 2024	Feb 13, 2024		
Battlefield 2042	First-person shooter	DICE	Electronic Arts	Nov 19, 2021	Nov 19, 2021	Nov 19, 2021	XP	
Battlefield 6	First-person shooter	Battlefield Studios	Electronic Arts	Oct 10, 2025	Oct 10, 2025	Oct 10, 2025		
Batora: Lost Haven	Action role-playing	Stormind Games	Team17	Oct 22, 2022	Oct 22, 2022	Oct 22, 2022		
Beast of Reincarnation	Action role-playing	Game Freak	Fictions	Aug 4, 2026	Aug 4, 2026	Aug 4, 2026		
Before Exit : Gas Station	Action-adventure	Take IT Studio!	Take IT Studio!	Nov 12, 2025	Nov 12, 2025	Nov 12, 2025		
Before Exit : Supermarket	Simulation	Take IT Studio!	Take IT Studio!	Sep 30, 2024	Sep 30, 2024	Sep 30, 2024		
Before I Forget	Adventure	Plug In Digital	Plug In Digital	Apr 29, 2021	Apr 29, 2021	Apr 29, 2021		
Before We Leave	City-building	Balancing Monkey Games	Team 17	Nov 22, 2021	Nov 22, 2021	Nov 22, 2021	SD OP	
Besiege	Simulation	Spiderling Studios	Spiderling Studios	Feb 10, 2022	Feb 10, 2022	Feb 10, 2022		
Beyond Contact	Survival	Playcorp Studios	Deep Silver	TBA	TBA	TBA		
The Big Con	Adventure	Mighty Yell	Skybound Games	Aug 31, 2021	Aug 31, 2021	Aug 31, 2021	OP	
The Binding of Isaac: Repentance	Roguelike	Nicalis	Nicalis	Nov 4, 2021	Nov 4, 2021	Nov 4, 2021		
Black Legend	Turn-based strategy	Warcave	Warcave	Mar 25, 2021	Mar 25, 2021	Mar 25, 2021		
Black Myth: Wukong	Action role-playing	Game Science	Game Science	Aug 20, 2025	Aug 20, 2025	Aug 20, 2025		
Blades of Fire	Action-adventure	MercurySteam	505 Games	May 22, 2025	May 22, 2025	May 22, 2025		
Blasphemous 2	Metroidvania	The Game Kitchen	Team17	Unreleased	Aug 23, 2023	Aug 23, 2023		
Blast Brigade vs. the Evil Legion of Dr. Cread	Action-adventure; platform	Allods Team Arcade	My.Games	TBA	TBA	TBA		
Blaster Master Zero	Platform	Inti Creates	Inti Creates	Jul 1, 2021	Jul 1, 2021	Jul 1, 2021		
Blaster Master Zero 2	Platform	Inti Creates	Inti Creates	Jul 15, 2021	Jul 15, 2021	Jul 15, 2021		
Blaster Master Zero 3	Platform	Inti Creates	Inti Creates	Jul 29, 2021	Jul 29, 2021	Jul 29, 2021		
Bleach Rebirth of Souls	Multiplayer	Tamsoft	Bandai Namco Entertainment	Mar 21, 2025	Mar 21, 2025	Mar 21, 2025		
Blood Bowl 3	Sports	Cyanide	Nacon	Feb 23, 2023	Feb 23, 2023	Feb 23, 2023		
BloodRayne Betrayal: Fresh Bites	Hack and slash; platform	WayForward	Ziggurat Interactive	Sep 9, 2021	Sep 9, 2021	Sep 9, 2021		
Biomutant	Action role-playing	Experiment 101	THQ Nordic	Sep 6, 2022	Sep 6, 2022	Sep 6, 2022		
Bleach: Rebirth of Souls	Fighting; Action	Tamsoft	Bandai Namco Entertainment	Mar 21, 2025	Mar 21, 2025	Mar 21, 2025		
The Blood of Dawnwalker	Action role-playing	Rebel Wolves	Bandai Namco Entertainment	Sep 3, 2026	Sep 3, 2026	Sep 3, 2026		
Blue Prince	Puzzle-adventure; Roguelike	Dogubomb	Raw Fury	Apr 10, 2024	Apr 10, 2024	Apr 10, 2024		
Bluey: The Videogame	Adventure	Artax Games	Outright Games	Nov 17, 2023	Nov 17, 2023	Nov 17, 2023		
Bluey's Quest for the Gold Pen	Adventure	Halfbrick Studios	Halfbrick Studios	May 28, 2026	May 28, 2026	May 28, 2026		
Bō: Path of the Teal Lotus	Platform; action-adventure	Squid Shock Studios	Humble Games	Unreleased	Jul 17, 2024	Jul 17, 2024		
Borderlands 3	Action role-playing; First-person shooter	Gearbox Software	2K Games	Nov 10, 2020	Nov 10, 2020	Nov 10, 2020	SD OP	
Borderlands 4	Action role-playing; First-person shooter	Gearbox Software	2K Games	Sep 12, 2025	Sep 12, 2025	Sep 12, 2025		
Boti: Byteland Overclocked	Action-adventure	Purple Ray Studio	Untold Tales	Jan 10, 2025	Jan 10, 2025	Jan 10, 2025	SD OP	
Boyfriend Dungeon	Dungeon crawl; Dating Sim	Kitfox Games	Kitfox Games	Aug 11, 2021	Aug 11, 2021	Aug 11, 2021		
Braid Anniversary Edition	Puzzle-platform	Thekla	Thekla	May 14, 2024	May 14, 2024	May 14, 2024		
Bratz: Flaunt Your Fashion	Action; adventure	Petoons Studio	Outright Games	Nov 4, 2022	Nov 4, 2022	Nov 4, 2022	OP	
Bravely Default: Flying Fairy HD Remaster	Role-playing	Cattle Call	Square Enix	Mar 12, 2026	Mar 12, 2026	Mar 12, 2026		
Breakout: Recharged	Puzzle	Adamvision Studios; SneakyBox	Atari	TBA	Feb 10, 2022	Feb 10, 2022		
Breathedge	Action-Adventure, Survival	Redruins Softworks	HypeTrain Digital	Feb 25, 2021	Feb 25, 2021	Feb 25, 2021	SD	
Bridge Constructor: The Walking Dead	Simulation; puzzle	ClockStone	Headup Games	TBA	Nov 19, 2020	Nov 19, 2020		
Bright Memory	First-person shooter	FYQD Personal Studio	Playism	Nov 10, 2020	Nov 10, 2020	Nov 10, 2020	OP	
Bright Memory: Infinite	First-person shooter	FYQD Personal Studio	Playism	Jul 21, 2022	Jul 21, 2022	Jul 21, 2022		
Bubsy in: The Purrfect Collection	Platform	Limited Run Games	Atari	Sep 9, 2025	Sep 9, 2025	Sep 9, 2025		
Buckshot Roulette	Digital tabletop; Horror	Mike Klubnika	Critical Reflex	Jul 8, 2026	Jul 8, 2026	Jul 8, 2026	SD PA OP	
Buddy Simulator 1984	Horror; Adventure; Role-playing	Not a Sailor Studios	Feardemic Games	Apr 6, 2023	Apr 6, 2023	Apr 6, 2023		
Bus Bound	Vehicle simulation	Stillalive Studios	Saber Interactive	Apr 30, 2026	Apr 30, 2026	Apr 30, 2026		
Bus Simulator 21	Vehicle simulation	Stillalive Studios	Astragon	May 16, 2023	May 16, 2023	May 16, 2023		
Bus Simulator 27	Vehicle simulation	Simteract	Astragon Entertainment	TBA	TBA	TBA		
Call of Duty: Black Ops Cold War	First-person shooter	Raven Software; Treyarch	Activision	Nov 13, 2020	Nov 13, 2020	Nov 13, 2020	OP XP	
Call of Duty: Black Ops 6	First-person shooter	Raven Software; Treyarch	Activision	Oct 25, 2024	Oct 25, 2024	Oct 25, 2024		
Call of Duty: Black Ops 7	First-person shooter	Raven Software; Treyarch	Activision	Nov 14, 2025	Nov 14, 2025	Nov 14, 2025		
Call of Duty: Modern Warfare II	First-person shooter	Infinity Ward	Activision	Oct 28, 2022	Oct 28, 2022	Oct 28, 2022		
Call of Duty: Modern Warfare III	First-person shooter	Sledgehammer Games	Activision	Nov 10, 2023	Nov 10, 2023	Nov 10, 2023		
Call of Duty: Modern Warfare 4	First-person shooter	Infinity Ward	Activision	Oct 23, 2026	Oct 23, 2026	Oct 23, 2026		
Call of Duty: Vanguard	First-person shooter	Sledgehammer Games	Activision	Nov 5, 2021	Nov 5, 2021	Nov 5, 2021		
Call of Duty: Warzone 2.0	Battle royale; first-person shooter	Raven Software; Treyarch	Activision	Nov 16, 2022	Nov 16, 2022	Nov 16, 2022		
Call of the Sea	Puzzle adventure	Out of the Blue	Raw Fury	Dec 8, 2020	Dec 8, 2020	Dec 8, 2020	SD OP	
The Callisto Protocol	Survival horror	Striking Distance Studios	Krafton	Unreleased	Dec 2, 2022	Dec 2, 2022		
Can't Drive This	Racing	Pixel Maniacs	Pixel Maniacs	Mar 19, 2021	Mar 19, 2021	Mar 19, 2021		
Captain Blood	Action-adventure; Hack and slash	SeaWolf Studio; General Arcade	SNEG	Unreleased	May 6, 2025	May 6, 2025	SD OP	
The Case of the Golden Idol	Puzzle	Color Gray Games	Playstack	Jul 8, 2024	Jul 8, 2024	Jul 8, 2024	SD PA OP	
Cassette Beasts	Role-playing	Bytten Studio	Raw Fury	Apr 26, 2023	May 25, 2023	May 25, 2023		
Centipede: Recharged	Puzzle	Adamvision Studios; SneakyBox	Atari	TBA	Sep 29, 2021	Sep 29, 2021		
Century: Age of Ashes	Action	Playwing	Playwing	Mar 10, 2022	Mar 10, 2022	Mar 10, 2022		
Chasing Static	Adventure	Headware Games	Ratalaika Games	Jan 12, 2023	Jan 12, 2023	Jan 12, 2023	SD OP	
Chernobylite	Survival	The Farm 51	All In! Games	Apr 21, 2022	Apr 21, 2022	Apr 21, 2022		
Chicory: A Colorful Tale	Adventure	Wishes Unlimited	Finji	May 30, 2023	May 30, 2023	May 30, 2023	SD PA OP	
Choo-Choo Charles	Survival horror	Two Star Games	Two Star Games	Dec 21, 2023	Dec 21, 2023	Dec 21, 2023	SD PA OP	
Chorus	Space combat	Fishlabs	Deep Silver	Dec 3, 2021	Dec 3, 2021	Dec 3, 2021	SD OP	
Cities: Skylines Remastered	City-building; construction and management simulation	Colossal Order	Paradox Interactive	Feb 15, 2023	Feb 15, 2023	Feb 15, 2023		
Citizen Sleeper	Role-playing	Jump Over the Age	Fellow Traveller	May 5, 2022	May 5, 2022	May 5, 2022	SD PA OP	
Citizen Sleeper 2: Starward Vector	Role-playing	Jump Over the Age	Fellow Traveller	Jan 31, 2025	Jan 31, 2025	Jan 31, 2025		
Civilization VII	4X; turn-based strategy	Firaxis Games	2K	Feb 11, 2025	Feb 11, 2025	Feb 11, 2025		
Clair Obscur: Expedition 33	Role-playing	Sandfall Interactive	Kepler Interactive	Apr 24, 2025	Apr 24, 2025	Apr 24, 2025		
Clash: Artifacts of Chaos	Action-adventure	ACE Team	Nacon	Mar 9, 2023	Mar 9, 2023	Mar 9, 2023		
Clive Barker's Hellraiser: Revival	Action; Survival horror	Saber Interactive	Saber Interactive	2026	2026	2026		
Cocoon	Puzzle; Indie game; Action game; Adventure	Geometric Interactive	Annapurna Interactive	Sep 29, 2023	Sep 29, 2023	Sep 29, 2023		
Code Vein II	Action role-playing	Bandai Namco Studios	Bandai Namco Entertainment	Jan 29, 2026	Jan 29, 2026	Jan 29, 2026		
Cogen: Sword of Rewind	Platform	Gemdrops	Gemdrops	Jan 27, 2022	Jan 27, 2022	Jan 27, 2022		
Commandos: Origins	Real-time tactics	Claymore Game Studios	Kalypso Media	Apr 9, 2025	Apr 9, 2025	Apr 9, 2025		
Company of Heroes 3	Real-time strategy	Relic Entertainment	Sega	May 30, 2023	May 30, 2023	May 30, 2023		
Contra: Operation Galuga	Platform	WayForward	Konami	Mar 12, 2024	Mar 12, 2024	Mar 12, 2024		
Control: Ultimate Edition	Action-adventure; Third-person shooter	Remedy Entertainment	505 Games	Feb 2, 2021	Feb 2, 2021	Feb 2, 2021		
Control 2	Action role-playing	Remedy Entertainment	Remedy Entertainment	TBA	TBA	TBA		
Convergence: A League of Legends Story	Metroidvania	Double Stallion	Riot Forge	May 23, 2023	May 23, 2023	May 23, 2023		
Conway: Disappearance at Dahlia View	Adventure	White Paper Games	Sold Out	Nov 2, 2021	Nov 2, 2021	Nov 2, 2021		
Cookie Clicker	Incremental	DashNet	Playsaurus	May 22, 2025	May 22, 2025	May 22, 2025		
Coral Island	Farm life sim	Stairway Games	Humble Games	Unreleased	Nov 14, 2023	Unreleased		
Core Keeper	Sandbox; survival	Pugstorm	Fireshine Games	Aug 27, 2024	Aug 27, 2024	Aug 27, 2024		
Crash Bandicoot 4: It's About Time	Platform	Toys for Bob	Activision	TBA	Mar 12, 2021	Mar 12, 2021	SD	
Crashout Crew	Action; Party	Aggro Crab	Aggro Crab	May 28, 2026	May 28, 2026	May 28, 2026		
Crash Team Rumble	Real-time strategy; Platform	Toys for Bob	Activision	Jun 20, 2023	Jun 20, 2023	Jun 20, 2023	SD OP	
The Crew Motorfest	Racing	Ubisoft Ivory Tower	Ubisoft	Sep 14, 2023	Sep 14, 2023	Sep 14, 2023		
Cricket 22	Sports	Big Ant Studios	Nacon	Dec 2, 2021	Dec 2, 2021	Dec 2, 2021	SD OP	
Cricket 24	Sports	Big Ant Studios	Nacon	Oct 5, 2023	Oct 5, 2023	Oct 5, 2023	SD OP	
Cricket 26	Sports	Big Ant Studios	Nacon	Nov 19, 2025	Nov 19, 2025	Nov 19, 2025		
Crime Boss: Rockay City	First-person shooter	Ingame Studios	505 Games	Jun 15, 2023	Jun 15, 2023	Jun 15, 2023		
Crimson Desert	Action-adventure	Pearl Abyss	Pearl Abyss	Mar 19, 2026	Mar 19, 2026	Mar 19, 2026		
Crisis Core: Final Fantasy VII Reunion	Role-playing	Square Enix	Square Enix	Dec 13, 2022	Dec 13, 2022	Dec 13, 2022	OP	
Cris Tales	Role-playing	Dreams Uncorporated; Syck	Modus Games	Jul 20, 2021	Jul 20, 2021	Jul 20, 2021		
Cronos: The New Dawn	Survival horror	Bloober Team	Bloober Team	Sep 5, 2025	Sep 5, 2025	Sep 5, 2025		
CrossfireX	First-person shooter	Remedy Entertainment; Smilegate	Xbox Game Studios	Feb 10, 2022	Feb 10, 2022	Feb 10, 2022	SD OP	
Crow Country	Survival horror	SFB Games	SFB Games	Oct 22, 2024	May 9, 2024	May 9, 2024		
Crowsworn	Metroidvania	Mongoose Rodeo	Mongoose Rodeo	TBA	TBA	TBA		
CRSED: F.O.A.D.	First-person shooter	Darkflow Studio	Gaijin Entertainment	Unreleased	Dec 22, 2020	Dec 22, 2020		
Crusader Kings III	Grand strategy; role-playing	Paradox Development Studio; Lab42	Paradox Interactive	Mar 29, 2022	Mar 29, 2022	Mar 29, 2022		
Cursed to Golf	Roguelike; Sports	Chuhai Labs	Thunderful Publishing	Aug 18, 2022	Aug 18, 2022	Aug 18, 2022	SD OP	
Curse of the Sea Rats	Metroidvania	Petoon Studios	PQube	Unknown	Apr 6, 2023	Unknown		
Cyber Citizen Shockman	Platformer; hack and slash	Shinyuden	Ratalaika Games	May 18, 2023	May 18, 2023	May 18, 2023	SD OP	
Cyber Citizen Shockman 3: The Princess from Another World	Platformer; hack and slash	Shinyuden	Ratalaika Games	May 3, 2024	May 3, 2024	May 3, 2024	SD OP	
Cyberpunk 2077	Action role-playing	CD Projekt Red	CD Projekt	Feb 15, 2022	Feb 15, 2022	Feb 15, 2022	SD OP	
Daemon X Machina: Titanic Scion	Action; Third-person shooter	Marvelous First Studio	Marvelous (Company)	Sep 5, 2025	Sep 5, 2025	Sep 5, 2025		
The Dark Pictures Anthology: The Devil in Me	Interactive drama; Survival horror	Supermassive Games	Bandai Namco Entertainment	Unreleased	Nov 18, 2022	Nov 18, 2022		
The Dark Pictures Anthology: House of Ashes	Interactive drama; Survival horror	Supermassive Games	Bandai Namco Entertainment	Oct 22, 2021	Oct 22, 2021	Oct 22, 2021		
The Dark Pictures Anthology: Little Hope	Interactive drama; Survival horror	Supermassive Games	Bandai Namco Entertainment	Sep 27, 2022	Sep 27, 2022	Sep 27, 2022		
The Dark Pictures Anthology: Man of Medan	Interactive drama; Survival horror	Supermassive Games	Bandai Namco Entertainment	Sep 27, 2022	Sep 27, 2022	Sep 27, 2022		
Darksiders II: Deathinitive Edition	Action role-playing; hack and slash	Gunfire Games	THQ Nordic	Oct 15, 2024	Oct 15, 2024	Oct 15, 2024		
Darq: Complete Edition	Psychological horror	Unfold Games	Feardemic	Mar 25, 2021	Mar 25, 2021	Mar 25, 2021		
Darwin's Paradox!	Platform	ZDT Studio	Konami	2026	2026	2026		
Date Everything!	Dating sim; Visual novel	Sassy Chap Games	Team17	Jun 17, 2025	Jun 17, 2025	Jun 17, 2025		
Dawn of the Monsters	Beat 'em up	13AM Games	WayForward	Mar 15, 2022	Mar 15, 2022	Mar 15, 2022		
Daymare: 1994 Sandcastle	Survival horror	Invader Studios	Leonardo Interactive	Aug 30, 2023	Aug 30, 2023	Aug 30, 2023		
DC Universe Online	Massively multiplayer online game; Action	Dimensional Ink Games	Daybreak Game Company	Unreleased	Oct 23, 2024	Oct 23, 2024		
Dead by Daylight	Survival horror	Behaviour Interactive	Behaviour Interactive	Nov 10, 2020	Nov 10, 2020	Nov 10, 2020	SD	
Deadcraft	Survival	Marvelous First Studio	JP: Marvelous; WW: Xseed Games	May 19, 2022	May 19, 2022	May 19, 2022		
Dead Space	Survival horror	Motive Studios	Electronic Arts	Jan 27, 2023	Jan 27, 2023	Jan 27, 2023		
Deathloop	First-person shooter	Arkane Studios	Bethesda Softworks	Sep 20, 2022	Sep 20, 2022	Sep 20, 2022		
Death's Door	Action-adventure	Acid Nerve	Devolver Digital	Jul 20, 2021	Jul 20, 2021	Jul 20, 2021		
Death Stranding Director's Cut	Action	Kojima Productions	505 Games	Nov 7, 2024	Nov 7, 2024	Nov 7, 2024	PA	
Deceive Inc.	First-person shooter	Sweet Bandits Studios	Tripwire Interactive	Mar 21, 2023	Mar 21, 2023	Mar 21, 2023		
Deep Rock Galactic	First-person shooter	Ghost Ship Games	Coffee Stain Publishing	Unreleased	Sep 9, 2022	Sep 9, 2022		
Deep Rock Galactic: Survivor	Shoot 'em up	Funday Games	Ghost Ship Publishing	Sep 17, 2025	Sep 17, 2025	Sep 17, 2025		
Deliver Us Mars	Action-adventure	KeokeN Interactive	Frontier Foundry	Feb 2, 2023	Feb 2, 2023	Feb 2, 2023	SD OP	
Demon Slayer: Kimetsu no Yaiba – The Hinokami Chronicles	Fighting	CyberConnect2	JP: Aniplex; WW: Sega	Oct 14, 2021	Oct 15, 2021	Oct 15, 2021		
Descenders	Racing	RageSquid	No More Robots, Fireshine Games	May 7, 2019	May 7, 2019	May 7, 2019		
Despelote	Adventure	Julián Cordero; ebastián Valbuena	Panic	May 1, 2025	May 1, 2025	May 1, 2025		
Destiny 2	First-person shooter	Bungie	Bungie	Dec 8, 2020	Dec 8, 2020	Dec 8, 2020	SD OP	
Destroy All Humans! 2: Reprobed	Action-adventure	Black Forest Games	THQ Nordic	Aug 30, 2022	Aug 30, 2022	Aug 30, 2022		
Devil May Cry 5: Special Edition	Action-adventure; Hack and slash	Capcom	Capcom	Nov 10, 2020	Nov 10, 2020	Nov 10, 2020	OP	
Diablo II: Resurrected	Action role-playing	Vicarious Visions	Blizzard Entertainment	Sep 23, 2021	Sep 23, 2021	Sep 23, 2021		
Diablo IV	Action role-playing	Blizzard Team 3; Blizzard Albany	Blizzard Entertainment	June 5, 2023	June 5, 2023	June 5, 2023	XP SD OP	
Digimon Story: Time Stranger	Role-playing	Media.Vision	Bandai Namco Entertainment	Oct 2, 2025	Oct 3, 2025	Oct 3, 2025		
Dinos Reborn	Survival; action	HardCodeWay	Vision Edge Entertainment	2022	2022	2022		
The Diofield Chronicle	Strategy role-playing	Square Enix; Lancarse	Square Enix	Jan 1, 2023	Jan 1, 2023	Jan 1, 2023		
Directive 8020	Interactive drama; Survival horror	Supermassive Games	Supermassive Games	Oct 2, 2025	Oct 2, 2025	Oct 2, 2025		
Dirt 5	Racing	Codemasters	Codemasters	Nov 10, 2020	Nov 10, 2020	Nov 10, 2020	SD OP	
Disciples: Liberation	Turn-based strategy	Frima Studio	Kalypso Media	Oct 21, 2021	Oct 21, 2021	Oct 21, 2021		
Disco Elysium: The Final Cut	Role-playing	ZA/UM	ZA/UM	Oct 12, 2021	Oct 12, 2021	Oct 12, 2021		
Disney Dreamlight Valley	Life simulation; Adventure	Gameloft Montreal	Gameloft	Dec 5, 2023	Dec 5, 2023	Dec 5, 2023	XP SD OP	
Disney Illusion Island Starring Mickey & Friends	Platform	Dlala Studios	Disney Electronic Content	May 30, 2025	May 30, 2025	May 30, 2025		
Disney Speedstorm	Racing	Gameloft Barcelona	Gameloft	Sep 28, 2023	Sep 28, 2023	Sep 28, 2023	XP SD OP	
Dispatch	Adventure; Interactive film; Simulation	AdHoc Studio	AdHoc Studio	Jul 29, 2026	Jul 29, 2026	Jul 29, 2026	PA	
Divinity: Original Sin II – Definitive Edition	Role-playing	Larian Studios	Larian Studios	Dec 15, 2025	Dec 15, 2025	Dec 15, 2025		
DJMax Respect V	Rhythm	Neowiz MUCA	Neowiz Games	Jul 7, 2022	Jul 7, 2022	Jul 7, 2022	XP PA SD OP	
Doctor Who: The Edge of Reality	Adventure	Maze Theory	BBC Studios; Just Add Water	Unreleased	Sep 30, 2021	Sep 30, 2021		
Doki Doki Literature Club Plus!	Visual novel	Team Salvato	Serenity Forge	Jun 30, 2021	Jun 30, 2021	Jun 30, 2021		
Doom: The Dark Ages	First-person shooter	id Software	Bethesda Softworks	May 16, 2025	May 16, 2025	May 16, 2025		
Doom Eternal	First-person shooter	id Software	Bethesda Softworks	Jun 29, 2021	Jun 29, 2021	Jun 29, 2021	SD OP	
Double Dragon Revive	Beat 'em up	Yuke's	Arc System Works	Oct 23, 2025	Oct 23, 2025	Oct 23, 2025		
Double Dragon Gaiden: Rise of the Dragons	Beat 'em up; Roguelike	Secret Base	Modus Games	Jul 27, 2023	Jul 27, 2023	Jul 27, 2023	SD OP	
Dr. Fetus' Mean Meat Machine	Puzzle	Team Meat	Headup Games; Thunderful Games	Jun 22, 2023	Jun 22, 2023	Jun 22, 2023		
Dragon Age: The Veilguard	Action role-playing	BioWare	Electronic Arts	Oct 31, 2024	Oct 31, 2024	Oct 31, 2024		
Dragon Ball FighterZ	Fighting	Arc System Works	Bandai Namco Entertainment	Feb 29, 2024	Feb 29, 2024	Feb 29, 2024		
Dragon Ball Z: Kakarot	Action role-playing	CyberConnect2	Bandai Namco Entertainment	Jan 12, 2023	Jan 13, 2023	Jan 13, 2023		
Dragon Ball: Sparking! Zero	Fighting	Spike Chunsoft	Bandai Namco Entertainment	Oct 11, 2024	Oct 11, 2024	Oct 11, 2024		
Dragon Ball Xenoverse 2	Fighting; Role-playing	Dimps	Bandai Namco Entertainment	May 23, 2024	May 23, 2024	May 23, 2024		
Dragon Quest III HD-2D Remake	Role-playing	Artdink	Square Enix	Nov 14, 2024	Nov 14, 2024	Nov 14, 2024		
DreamWorks All-Star Kart Racing	Kart racing	Bamtang Games	GameMill Entertainment	Nov 3, 2023	Nov 3, 2023	Nov 3, 2023	SD OP	
Ducky Dash	Platformer	Old School Vibes	Old School Vibes	Sep 24, 2024	Sep 24, 2024	Sep 24, 2024	SD OP	
Dune: Awakening	Survival	Funcom	Funcom	TBA	TBA	TBA		
Dungeons of Hinterberg	Action role-playing	Microbird Games	Curve Games	July 18, 2024	July 18, 2024	July 18, 2024		
Dungeons & Dragons: Dark Alliance	Role-playing	Tuque Games	Wizards of the Coast	Jun 22, 2021	Jun 22, 2021	Jun 22, 2021		
Dust & Neon	Twin-stick shooter	David Marquardt Studios	Rogue Games; Netflix	Aug 17, 2023	Aug 17, 2023	Aug 17, 2023		
Dustborn	Action-adventure	Red Thread Games	Spotlight by Quantic Dream	Aug 20, 2024	Aug 20, 2024	Aug 20, 2024		
Dying Light: The Beast	Survival horror	Techland	Techland	Sep 18, 2025	Sep 18, 2025	Sep 18, 2025		
Dying Light 2 Stay Human	Action role-playing; Survival horror	Techland	Techland Publishing	Feb 4, 2022	Feb 4, 2022	Feb 4, 2022		
Dynasty Warriors 3: Complete Edition Remastered	Hack and slash	Omega Force	Koei Tecmo	Mar 19, 2026	Mar 19, 2026	Mar 19, 2026		
Dynasty Warriors 9: Empires	Hack and slash	Omega Force	Koei Tecmo	Dec 23, 2021	Feb 15, 2022	Feb 15, 2022		
Dynasty Warriors: Origins	Hack and slash	Omega Force	Koei Tecmo	Jan 17, 2025	Jan 17, 2025	Jan 17, 2025		
EA Sports College Football 25	Sports	EA Orlando	EA Sports	Jul 19, 2024	Jul 19, 2024	Jul 19, 2024		
EA Sports College Football 26	Sports	EA Orlando	EA Sports	Jul 10, 2025	Jul 10, 2025	Jul 10, 2025		
EA Sports FC 24	Sports	EA Vancouver; EA Romania	EA Sports	Sep 29, 2023	Sep 29, 2023	Sep 29, 2023	OP XP	
EA Sports FC 25	Sports	EA Vancouver; EA Romania	EA Sports	Sep 27, 2024	Sep 27, 2024	Sep 27, 2024		
EA Sports FC 26	Sports	EA Vancouver; EA Romania	EA Sports	Sep 26, 2025	Sep 26, 2025	Sep 26, 2025		
EA Sports PGA Tour	Sports	EA Tiburon	Electronic Arts	Mar 24, 2023	Mar 24, 2023	Mar 24, 2023		
EA Sports UFC 5	Fighting; Sports	EA Vancouver	EA Sports	Oct 27, 2023	Oct 27, 2023	Oct 27, 2023		
EA Sports WRC	Racing	Codemasters	EA Sports	Nov 3, 2023	Nov 3, 2023	Nov 3, 2023		
Ebenezer and the Invisible World	Metroidvania	Play on Worlds; Orbit Studio	Play on Worlds	Nov 3, 2023	Nov 3, 2023	Nov 3, 2023	SD OP	
Echo Generation	Turn-based role-playing	Cococucumber	Cococucumber	TBA	TBA	TBA		
Edge of Eternity	Role-playing	Midgard Studio	Dear Villagers	2021	2021	2021		
eFootball 2022	Sports	Konami	Konami	Sep 30, 2021	Sep 30, 2021	Sep 30, 2021		
Egg Boy	Shooter game	China Yousoi	China Yousoi	Sep 27, 2024	Sep 27, 2024	Sep 27, 2024		
Egging On	Platformer	Egobounds	Alibi Games Limited; IndieArk	Nov 6, 2025	Nov 6, 2025	Nov 6, 2025		
Eiyuden Chronicle: Hundred Heroes	Japanese role-playing	Rabbit & Bear Studios	505 Games	Apr 23, 2024	Apr 23, 2024	Apr 23, 2024		
Eiyuden Chronicle: Rising	Japanese role-playing	Rabbit & Bear Studios	505 Games	May 10, 2022	May 10, 2022	May 10, 2022		
ELEX II	Action role-playing	Piranha Bytes	THQ Nordic	Mar 1, 2022	Mar 1, 2022	Mar 1, 2022		
Elden Ring	Action role-playing	FromSoftware	Bandai Namco Entertainment	Feb 25, 2022	Feb 25, 2022	Feb 25, 2022		
Elden Ring Nightreign	Action role-playing	FromSoftware	Bandai Namco Entertainment	May 30, 2025	May 30, 2025	May 30, 2025	SD OP	
The Elder Scrolls V: Skyrim	Role-playing	Bethesda Game Studios	Bethesda Softworks	Nov 11, 2021	Nov 11, 2021	Nov 11, 2021		
The Elder Scrolls IV: Oblivion Remastered	Action role-playing	Virtuos; Bethesda Game Studios	Bethesda Softworks	Apr 22, 2025	Apr 22, 2025	Apr 22, 2025		
The Elder Scrolls Online	Massively multiplayer online role-playing	ZeniMax Online Studios	Bethesda Softworks	Jun 15, 2021	Jun 15, 2021	Jun 15, 2021	SD OP	
Elon and the Divine Proof	Platformer	Derik D.F	Derik D.F	Unreleased	Sep 3, 2024	Sep 3, 2024		
Empire of the Ants	Adventure; real-time strategy	Tower Five	Microids	Nov 7, 2024	Nov 7, 2024	Nov 7, 2024		
Enchanted Portals	Run and gun	Xixo Games Studio	Xixo Games Studio	Sep 8, 2023	Sep 8, 2023	Sep 8, 2023		
Ender Lilies: Quietus of the Knights	Metroidvania	Live Wire; Adglobe	Binary Haze Interactive	Jun 29, 2021	Jun 29, 2021	Jun 29, 2021		
Enlisted	First-person shooter	DarkFlow Software	Gaijin Entertainment	Nov 10, 2020	Nov 10, 2020	Nov 10, 2020		
Enshrouded	Survival; Action RPG	Keen Games	Keen Games	2025	2025	2025		
Eternal Strands	Action-adventure	Yellow Brick Games	Yellow Brick Games	Jan 28, 2025	Jan 28, 2025	Jan 28, 2025		
Euro Truck Simulator 2	Vehicle simulation	SCS Software	SCS Software	TBA	TBA	TBA		
Ever Forward	Puzzle adventure	Pathea Games	PM Studios	Aug 10, 2021	Aug 10, 2021	Aug 10, 2021		
Evergate	Puzzle-platform	Stone Lantern Games	PQube	Nov 10, 2020	Nov 10, 2020	Nov 10, 2020		
Evil Dead: The Game	Horror	Boss Team Games	Saber Interactive	May 13, 2022	May 13, 2022	May 13, 2022		
Evil Genius 2: World Domination	Real-time strategy; simulation	Rebellion Developments	Rebellion Developments	TBA	Nov 30, 2021	Nov 30, 2021		
The Exit 8	Adventure; Walking simulator	Kotake Create	Playism	Jan 8, 2025	Jan 8, 2025	Jan 8, 2025		
Exodus	Role-playing	Archetype Entertainment	Wizards of the Coast	Apr 7, 2027	Apr 7, 2027	Apr 7, 2027		
Exomecha	First-person shooter	TwistedRed	TwistedRed	TBA	TBA	TBA		
Exo One	Adventure	Exbleative	Future Friends Games	Nov 18, 2021	Nov 18, 2021	Nov 18, 2021	SD PA OP	
Exophobia	First-person shooter	Zarc Attack	PM Studios	Unreleased	Jul 23, 2024	Jul 23, 2024		
Exoprimal	Survival horror; third-person shooter	Capcom	Capcom	Jul 14, 2023	Jul 14, 2023	Jul 14, 2023		
The Expanse: Osiris Reborn	Action role-playing	Owlcat Games	Owlcat Games	Q1/Q2 2027	Q1/Q2 2027	Q1/Q2 2027		
F1 2021	Racing	Codemasters	Electronic Arts	Jul 16, 2021	Jul 16, 2021	Jul 16, 2021		
F1 22	Racing	Codemasters	Electronic Arts	Jul 1, 2022	Jul 1, 2022	Jul 1, 2022		
F1 23	Racing	Codemasters	Electronic Arts	Jun 16, 2023	Jun 16, 2023	Jun 16, 2023		
F1 24	Racing	Codemasters	Electronic Arts	May 31, 2024	May 31, 2024	May 31, 2024		
F1 25	Racing	Codemasters	Electronic Arts	May 30, 2025	May 30, 2025	May 30, 2025		
F1 Manager 2022	Business simulation	Frontier Developments	Frontier Developments	Aug 30, 2022	Aug 30, 2022	Aug 30, 2022		
F1 Manager 2023	Business simulation	Frontier Developments	Frontier Developments	Jul 31, 2023	Jul 31, 2023	Jul 31, 2023		
F1 Manager 2024	Business simulation	Frontier Developments	Frontier Developments	Jul 23, 2024	Jul 23, 2024	Jul 23, 2024		
Fable	Action role-playing	Playground Games	Xbox Game Studios	Feb 23, 2027	Feb 23, 2027	Feb 23, 2027		
The Falconeer	Simulation	Tomas Sala	Wired Productions	Nov 10, 2020	Nov 10, 2020	Nov 10, 2020		
Fall Guys: Ultimate Knockout	Battle royale	Mediatonic	Devolver Digital	Jun 21, 2022	Jun 21, 2022	Jun 21, 2022		
Fallout 76	Action role-playing	Bethesda Game Studios	Bethesda Softworks	Sep 15, 2026	Sep 15, 2026	Sep 15, 2026		
Far: Changing Tides	Adventure; Puzzle	Okomotive	Frontier Foundry	Mar 1, 2022	Mar 1, 2022	Mar 1, 2022	SD OP	
Far Cry 6	First-person shooter	Ubisoft Toronto	Ubisoft	Oct 7, 2021	Oct 7, 2021	Oct 7, 2021	SD OP	
Farming Simulator 22	Simulation	Giants Software	Giants Software	Nov 22, 2021	Nov 22, 2021	Nov 22, 2021		
Farming Simulator 25	Simulation	Giants Software	Giants Software	Nov 12, 2024	Nov 12, 2024	Nov 12, 2024		
Farm Tycoon	Simulation	Console Labs S.A./SONKA S.A./Cleversan Games	PlayWay S.A.	Apr 23, 2024	Apr 24, 2024	Apr 24, 2024	EN OP	
Fantasian Neo Dimension	Role-playing	Mistwalker	Square Enix	Dec 5, 2024	Dec 5, 2024	Dec 5, 2024		
Fatal Frame: Maiden of Black Water	Survival horror	Koei Tecmo	Koei Tecmo	Oct 28, 2021	Oct 28, 2021	Oct 28, 2021		
Fatal Fury: City of the Wolves	Fighting	SNK	SNK	Apr 24, 2025	Apr 24, 2025	Apr 24, 2025		
Fatum Betula	Adventure	Bryce Bucher	Baltoro Games	Jan 19, 2022	Jan 19, 2022	Jan 19, 2022		
FBC: Firebreak	First-person shooter	Remedy Entertainment	Remedy Entertainment	Jun 17, 2025	Jun 17, 2025	Jun 17, 2025		
Flashback 2	Action	Microids	Microids	Nov 16, 2023	Nov 16, 2023	Nov 16, 2023		
Flea Madness	Action	Missset	Crytivo	2021	2021	2021		
Flintlock: The Siege of Dawn	Action role-playing	A44 Games	Kepler Interactive	Jul 18, 2024	Jul 18, 2024	Jul 18, 2024	PA	
FIFA 21	Sports	EA Vancouver	Electronic Arts	Dec 4, 2020	Dec 4, 2020	Dec 4, 2020	EN OP	
FIFA 22	Sports	EA Vancouver	Electronic Arts	Oct 1, 2021	Oct 1, 2021	Oct 1, 2021		
FIFA 23	Sports	EA Vancouver	Electronic Arts	Sep 30, 2022	Sep 30, 2022	Sep 30, 2022		
Fight'N Rage	Beat 'em up	BlitWorks	BlitWorks	Mar 1, 2023	Mar 1, 2023	Mar 1, 2023		
Final Fantasy VII Rebirth	Action role-playing	Square Enix Creative Business Unit I	Square Enix	Jun 3, 2026	Jun 3, 2026	Jun 3, 2026		
Final Fantasy VII Revelation	Action role-playing	Square Enix Creative Studio I	Square Enix	Apr 8, 2027	Apr 8, 2027	Apr 8, 2027		
Final Fantasy VII Remake Intergrade	Action role-playing	Square Enix	Square Enix	Jan 22, 2026	Jan 22, 2026	Jan 22, 2026		
Final Fantasy XIV Online	MMORPG	Square Enix	Square Enix	Mar 21, 2024	Mar 21, 2024	Mar 21, 2024	XP	
Final Fantasy XVI	Action role-playing	Square Enix Creative Business Unit III	Square Enix	Jun 8, 2025	Jun 8, 2025	Jun 8, 2025		
The Finals	First-person shooter	Embark Studios	Embark Studios	Dec 7, 2023	Dec 7, 2023	Dec 7, 2023		
The First Descendant	Third-person shooter; Looter shooter	Nexon	Nexon	Jul 2, 2024	Jul 2, 2024	Jul 2, 2024		
Fishing Sim World: Bass Pro Shops Edition	Fishing	Dovetail Games	Dovetail Games	Unreleased	Nov 3, 2020	Unreleased		
Five Nights at Freddy's: Into the Pit	Horror; Adventure	Mega Cat Studios	Mega Cat Studios	Sep 27, 2024	Sep 27, 2024	Sep 27, 2024	SD OP	
Five Nights at Freddy's: Security Breach	Survival horror	Steel Wool Studios	ScottGames	Nov 22, 2022	Nov 22, 2022	Nov 22, 2022		
Flying Candy	Shooter	SilenGames	SilenGames	Nov 11, 2025	Nov 11, 2025	Nov 11, 2025		
Fobia: St. Dinfna Hotel	Psychological horror	Pulsatrix Studios	Maximum Games	Jun 28, 2022	Jun 28, 2022	Jun 28, 2022		
Football Manager 2021	Sports	Sports Interactive	Sega	Dec 1, 2020	Dec 1, 2020	Dec 1, 2020		
Football Manager 2022	Sports	Sports Interactive	Sega	Nov 9, 2021	Nov 9, 2021	Nov 9, 2021		
Football Manager 2023	Sports	Sports Interactive	Sega	Nov 8, 2022	Nov 8, 2022	Nov 8, 2022		
Football Manager 2024 Console	Sports	Sports Interactive	Sega	Nov 6, 2023	Nov 6, 2023	Nov 6, 2023	XP PA SD OP	
Football Manager 26 Console	Sports	Sports Interactive	Sega	Nov 4, 2025	Nov 4, 2025	Nov 4, 2025	XP PA SD OP	
Foreclosed	Action-adventure	Antab	Merge Games	Aug 12, 2021	Aug 12, 2021	Aug 12, 2021		
The Forest Cathedral	Adventure; Puzzle	Brian Wilson	Whitethorn Games	Mar 13, 2023	Mar 13, 2023	Mar 13, 2023		
Forge of the Fae	Role-playing	Datadyne	Deck13 Spotlight	2027	2027	2027		
The Forgotten City	Adventure	Modern Storyteller	Dear Villagers	Jul 28, 2021	Jul 28, 2021	Jul 28, 2021	OP PA	
Fortnite	Battle royale; Sandbox; Survival	Epic Games	Epic Games	Nov 10, 2020	Nov 10, 2020	Nov 10, 2020	XP SD OP	
Forza Horizon 4	Racing	Playground Games	Xbox Game Studios	Nov 10, 2020	Nov 10, 2020	Nov 10, 2020	SD PA OP	
Forza Horizon 5	Racing	Playground Games	Xbox Game Studios	Nov 9, 2021	Nov 9, 2021	Nov 9, 2021	SD PA OP	
Forza Horizon 6	Racing	Playground Games	Xbox Game Studios	May 19, 2026	May 19, 2026	May 19, 2026		
Forza Motorsport	Racing	Turn 10 Studios	Xbox Game Studios	Oct 10, 2023	Oct 10, 2023	Oct 10, 2023		
FragPunk	First-person shooter; Hero shooter	Bad Guitar Studio	NetEase	Apr 29, 2025	Apr 29, 2025	Apr 29, 2025		
Fran Bow	Point-and-click adventure	Killmonday Games	Killmonday Games	Apr 28, 2023	Apr 28, 2023	Apr 28, 2023		
Freedom Planet 2	Platform	GalaxyTrail	GalaxyTrail	Apr 4, 2024	Apr 4, 2024	Apr 4, 2024		
Frostpunk 2	City-building; Survival	11 Bit Studios	11 Bit Studios	Sep 18, 2025	Sep 18, 2025	Sep 18, 2025		
Fuga: Melodies of Steel	Tactical role-playing	CyberConnect2	CyberConnect2	Jul 29, 2021	Jul 29, 2021	Jul 29, 2021		
Fuga: Melodies of Steel 2	Tactical role-playing	CyberConnect2	CyberConnect2	May 11, 2023	May 11, 2023	May 11, 2023		
Gaelic Football Laochra	Sports	Buck Eejit	Home Entertainment Suppliers	Unreleased	Unreleased	May 25, 2025		
Galacticare	Business simulation	Brightrock Games	Cult Games	May 23, 2024	May 23, 2024	May 23, 2024		
Gears 5	Third-person shooter	The Coalition	Xbox Game Studios	Nov 10, 2020	Nov 10, 2020	Nov 10, 2020	SD PA OP	
Gears of War: E-Day	Third-person shooter	The Coalition	Xbox Game Studios	Oct 6, 2026	Oct 6, 2026	Oct 6, 2026		
Gears Tactics	Turn-based strategy	The Coalition; Splash Damage	Xbox Game Studios	Nov 10, 2020	Nov 10, 2020	Nov 10, 2020	SD PA OP	
Genshin Impact	Action role-playing	HoYoverse	HoYoverse	Nov 20, 2024	Nov 20, 2024	Nov 20, 2024		
Ghostbusters: Spirits Unleashed	Action; First-person shooter	IllFonic	IllFonic	Oct 18, 2022	Oct 18, 2022	Oct 18, 2022	SD OP	
Ghostrunner	Action; platform	One More Level	All in! Games; 505 Games	Sep 28, 2021	Sep 28, 2021	Sep 28, 2021		
Ghostrunner 2	Action; Platform	One More Level	505 Games	Oct 26, 2023	Oct 26, 2023	Oct 26, 2023		
Ghostwire: Tokyo	Action-adventure	Tango Gameworks	Bethesda Softworks	Apr 12, 2023	Apr 12, 2023	Apr 12, 2023	PA	
Glover	Puzzle-platformer	Piko Interactive	QUByte Interactive; Bleem!	Feb 27, 2025	Feb 27, 2025	Feb 27, 2025	SD OP	
Gnosia	Visual novel; Role-playing; Social deduction	Petit Depotto	Playism	Dec 14, 2023	Dec 14, 2023	Dec 14, 2023		
Goals	Sports	Goals AB	Goals AB	Jun 4, 2026	Jun 4, 2026	Jun 4, 2026		
Goat Simulator Remastered	Simulation; Action	Coffee Stain Studios; Coffee Stain North; Deep Silver Fishlabs	Coffee Stain Publishing	Nov 7, 2024	Nov 7, 2024	Nov 7, 2024		
Goat Simulator 3	Simulation; Action	Coffee Stain North	Coffee Stain Publishing	Nov 17, 2022	Nov 17, 2022	Nov 17, 2022		
The God Slayer	Action role-playing	Pathea Games	Sony Interactive Entertainment	2027	2027	2027		
Goodnight Universe	Adventure	Nice Dream	Skybound Games	Nov 11, 2025	Nov 11, 2025	Nov 11, 2025		
Gotham Knights	Action role-playing game	WB Games Montréal	WB Games	Oct 25, 2022	Oct 25, 2022	Oct 25, 2022		
Gothic 1 Remake	Action role-playing	Alkimia Interactive	THQ Nordic	Jun 5, 2026	Jun 5, 2026	Jun 5, 2026		
Grand Theft Auto Online	Action-adventure	Rockstar North	Rockstar Games	Mar 15, 2022	Mar 15, 2022	Mar 15, 2022		
Grand Theft Auto: The Trilogy – The Definitive Edition	Action-adventure	Grove Street Games	Rockstar Games	Nov 11, 2021	Nov 11, 2021	Nov 11, 2021		
Grand Theft Auto V	Action-adventure	Rockstar North	Rockstar Games	Mar 15, 2022	Mar 15, 2022	Mar 15, 2022		
Grand Theft Auto VI	Action-adventure	Rockstar Games	Rockstar Games	Nov 19, 2026	Nov 19, 2026	Nov 19, 2026		
Graven	First-person shooter	Slipgate Ironworks	3D Realms; 1C Entertainment	TBA	TBA	TBA		
Great Northern	Interactive film	Little Wooden Toys	Little Wooden Toys	2027	2027	2027		
GreedFall	Action role-playing	Spiders	Focus Home Interactive	Jun 30, 2021	Jun 30, 2021	Jun 30, 2021		
GreedFall 2: The Dying World	Action role-playing	Spiders	Nacon	Mar 12, 2026	Mar 12, 2026	Mar 12, 2026		
Green Hell	Survival	Creepy Jar	Creepy Jar	Aug 14, 2024	Aug 14, 2024	Aug 14, 2024		
Green Soldiers Heroes	Shooter	DERIK D.F	DERIK D.F	Unreleased	Sep 7, 2023	Sep 7, 2023	SD OP	
Greyhill Incident	Survival horror	Refugium Games	Perp Games	Jul 21, 2023	Jul 21, 2023	Jul 21, 2023	SD OP	
Grid Legends	Racing	Codemasters	Electronic Arts	Feb 25, 2022	Feb 25, 2022	Feb 25, 2022		
Grounded	Action-adventure; Survival	Obsidian Entertainment	Xbox Game Studios	Sep 27, 2022	Sep 27, 2022	Sep 27, 2022	SD OP	
Grounded 2	Survival	Obsidian Entertainment; Eidos-Montréal	Xbox Game Studios	TBA	TBA	TBA		
Marvel's Guardians of the Galaxy	Action-adventure	Eidos-Montréal	Square Enix	Oct 26, 2021	Oct 26, 2021	Oct 26, 2021		
Guilty Gear Strive	Fighting	Arc System Works	WW: Arc System Works; PAL: Bandai Namco Entertainment	Mar 7, 2023	Mar 7, 2023	Mar 7, 2023		
Gungrave G.O.R.E.	Third-person shooter	Iggymob	Prime Matter	Nov 22, 2022	Nov 22, 2022	Nov 22, 2022		
The Gunk	Action-adventure	Image & Form Games	Thunderful	Dec 16, 2021	Dec 16, 2021	Dec 16, 2021	SD OP	
Gunvolt Chronicles Luminous Avenger iX 2	Platform	Inti Creates	Inti Creates	Jan 27, 2022	Jan 27, 2022	Jan 27, 2022		
Hades	Action role-playing; Roguelike	Supergiant Games	Supergiant Games	Aug 13, 2021	Aug 13, 2021	Aug 13, 2021		
Hades II	Roguelike; Action role-playing; Hack and slash	Supergiant Games	Supergiant Games	Apr 14, 2026	Apr 14, 2026	Apr 14, 2026	PA	
Halo: Campaign Evolved	First-person shooter	Halo Studios	Xbox Game Studios	Jul 28, 2026	Jul 28, 2026	Jul 28, 2026		
Halo Infinite	First-person shooter	343 Industries	Xbox Game Studios	Dec 8, 2021	Dec 8, 2021	Dec 8, 2021	SD PA OP	
Halo: The Master Chief Collection	First-person shooter	343 Industries; Bungie	Xbox Game Studios	Nov 17, 2020	Nov 17, 2020	Nov 17, 2020	SD OP	
Hammerwatch 2	Action role-playing	Crackshell	Modus Games	Unreleased	Apr 23, 2024	Apr 23, 2024		
Harry Potter: Quidditch Champions	Sports	Unbroken Studios	Warner Bros. Games	Sep 3, 2024	Sep 3, 2024	Sep 3, 2024		
Harold Halibut	Graphic adventure	Slow Bros.	Slow Bros.	Apr 16, 2024	Apr 16, 2024	Apr 16, 2024	PA	
Hatsune Miku Logic Paint S	Puzzle	Crypton Future Media	Crypton Future Media	Jan 19, 2022	Jan 19, 2022	Jan 19, 2022		
Haven	Adventure; role-playing	The Game Bakers	The Game Bakers	Dec 3, 2020	Dec 3, 2020	Dec 3, 2020		
Hawked	Action; Adventure	MY.GAMES	MY.GAMES	Unreleased	Feb 15, 2024	Feb 15, 2024		
Heart of the Woods	Visual novel	Studio Élan	Studio Élan	TBA	TBA	TBA		
Hellblade: Senua's Sacrifice	Action-adventure	Ninja Theory	Ninja Theory	TBA	Aug 9, 2021	Aug 9, 2021		
Hellboy Web of Wyrd	Beat 'em up; Roguelike	Upstream Arcade	Good Shepherd Entertainment (2023-2025); Big Fan Games (2025-)	Oct 18, 2023	Oct 18, 2023	Oct 18, 2023	SD OP	
Helldivers 2	Third-person shooter	Arrowhead Game Studios	Sony Interactive Entertainment	Aug 26, 2025	Aug 26, 2025	Aug 26, 2025		
Hell is Us	Action-adventure	Rogue Factor	Nacon	Sep 4, 2025	Sep 4, 2025	Sep 4, 2025		
Hell Let Loose	First-person shooter	Black Matter Party	Team17	Oct 5, 2021	Oct 5, 2021	Oct 5, 2021		
Hello Neighbor 2	Stealth; Survival horror	Dynamic Pixels	TinyBuild	Dec 6, 2022	Dec 6, 2022	Dec 6, 2022		
Hellpoint	Action role-playing	Cradle Games	TinyBuild	Jul 26, 2022	Jul 26, 2022	Jul 26, 2022		
Hi-Fi Rush	Action; Rhythm; Beat 'em up; Hack and slash	Tango Gameworks	Bethesda Softworks	Jan 25, 2023	Jan 25, 2023	Jan 25, 2023		
Highguard	Hero shooter	Wildlight Entertainment	Wildlight Entertainment	Jan 26, 2026	Jan 26, 2026	Jan 26, 2026		
High on Life	First-person shooter	Squanch Games	Squanch Games	Dec 13, 2022	Dec 13, 2022	Dec 13, 2022	SD PA OP	
High on Life 2	First-person shooter	Squanch Games	Squanch Games	Feb 13, 2026	Feb 13, 2026	Feb 13, 2026		
Hitman 3	Stealth	IO Interactive	IO Interactive	Jan 20, 2021	Jan 20, 2021	Jan 20, 2021	SD OP	
Hogwarts Legacy	Action role-playing	Avalanche Software	Portkey Games	Feb 10, 2023	Feb 10, 2023	Feb 10, 2023		
Hollow Knight	Metroidvania	Team Cherry	Team Cherry	Feb 5, 2026	Feb 5, 2026	Feb 5, 2026		
Hollow Knight: Silksong	Metroidvania	Team Cherry	Team Cherry	Sep 4, 2025	Sep 4, 2025	Sep 4, 2025		
Hood: Outlaws & Legends	Action-adventure	Sumo Digital	Focus Home Interactive	May 10, 2021	May 10, 2021	May 10, 2021		
Hot Wheels Unleashed	Racing	Milestone	Milestone	Sep 30, 2021	Sep 30, 2021	Sep 30, 2021		
Hotel Life: A Resort Simulator	Business simulation	RingZero Game Studio	Nacon	Aug 26, 2021	Aug 26, 2021	Aug 26, 2021		
House Builder Overtime	Simulation	FreeMind S.A./Console Labs S.A.	PlayWay	Dec 26, 2024	Dec 27, 2024	Dec 27, 2024		
House of Golf 2	Sports	Starlight Games	Starlight Games	Unreleased	Aug 16, 2024	Aug 16, 2024		
Hypercharge: Unboxed	First-person shooter; Third-person shooter	Digital Cybercherries	Digital Cybercherries	May 31, 2024	May 31, 2024	May 31, 2024		
Hyper Panda	Platformer	RAFAEL V.F	RAFAEL V.F	Feb 20, 2025	Feb 20, 2025	Feb 20, 2025		
I Am Dead	Adventure	Hollow Ponds	Annapurna Interactive	Aug 9, 2021	Aug 9, 2021	Aug 9, 2021		
I Am Fish	Action-adventure; simulation	Bossa Studios	Curve Digital	Sep 16, 2021	Sep 16, 2021	Sep 16, 2021		
I Am Future: Cozy Apocalypse Survival	Survival; Simulation	Mandragora	tinyBuild	Jan 8, 2026	Jan 8, 2026	Jan 8, 2026		
I Have No Mouth, and I Must Scream	Point-and-click adventure; Horror	The Dreamers Guild	Nightdive Studios	Mar 27, 2025	Mar 27, 2025	Mar 27, 2025	SD OP	
Icarus: Console Edition	Survival	RocketWerkz	Grip Studios	Feb 26, 2026	Feb 26, 2026	Feb 26, 2026		
Icy Gifts 2	Shooter	SilenGames	SilenGames	Feb 17, 2026	Feb 17, 2026	Feb 17, 2026		
Inazuma Eleven: Victory Road	Role-playing; Sports	Level-5	Level-5	Nov 14, 2025	Nov 13, 2025	Nov 13, 2025		
Indiana Jones and the Great Circle	Action-adventure	MachineGames	Bethesda Softworks	Dec 9, 2024	Dec 9, 2024	Dec 9, 2024		
Indika	Adventure	Odd-Meter	11 Bit Studios	May 19, 2024	May 19, 2024	May 19, 2024		
Infernax	Action-adventure	Berzerk Studio	The Arcade Crew	Unreleased	Feb 14, 2022	Feb 14, 2022		
The Inquisitor	Action-adventure	The Dust	Kalypso Media	Feb 8, 2024	Feb 8, 2024	Feb 8, 2024		
In Sound Mind	Psychological horror	We Create Stuff	Modus Games	Unreleased	Aug 3, 2021	Aug 3, 2021		
Instruments of Destruction	Simulation	Radiangames	Secret Mode	Oct 23, 2025	Oct 23, 2025	Oct 23, 2025		
Insurgency: Sandstorm	First-person shooter	New World Interactive	Focus Home Interactive	Jan 30, 2024	Jan 30, 2024	Jan 30, 2024		
Intrepid Izzy	Platformer; Metroidvania	Senile Team	Wave Game Studios	Dec 2, 2022	Dec 2, 2022	Dec 2, 2022		
The Invincible	Adventure	Starward Industries	11 Bit Studios	Nov 6, 2023	Nov 6, 2023	Nov 6, 2023		
Invincible VS	Fighting	Quarter Up	Skybound Games	Apr 30, 2026	Apr 30, 2026	Apr 30, 2026		
InZOI	Life simulation	inZOI Studio	Krafton	TBA	TBA	TBA		
Immortals Fenyx Rising	Action-adventure	Ubisoft Quebec	Ubisoft	Dec 3, 2020	Dec 3, 2020	Dec 3, 2020		
Iron Danger	Action role-playing	Action Squad Studios	Daedalic Entertainment	Aug 16, 2023	Aug 16, 2023	Aug 16, 2023		
Iron Harvest	Real-time strategy	King Art Games	Deep Silver	Oct 26, 2021	Oct 26, 2021	Oct 26, 2021		
It Takes Two	Action-adventure; platform	Hazelight Studios	Electronic Arts	Mar 26, 2021	Mar 26, 2021	Mar 26, 2021		
JDM: Japanese Drift Master	Racing	Gaming Factory	Gaming Factory	Nov 21, 2025	Nov 21, 2025	Nov 21, 2025		
JoJo's Bizarre Adventure: All Star Battle R	Fighting	CyberConnect2	Bandai Namco Entertainment	Sep 1, 2022	Sep 2, 2022	Sep 2, 2022		
Journey to the Savage Planet	First-person shooter	Raccoon Logic	505 Games	Feb 14, 2023	Feb 14, 2023	Feb 14, 2023		
Judgment	Action-adventure	Ryu Ga Gotoku Studio	Sega	Apr 23, 2021	Apr 23, 2021	Apr 23, 2021		
A Juggler's Tale	Platform	Kaleidoscube	Mixtvision Games	Unreleased	Sep 29, 2021	Sep 29, 2021		
Jujutsu Kaisen: Cursed Clash	Fighting	Byking; Gemdrops	Bandai Namco Entertainment	Feb 1, 2024	Feb 2, 2024	Feb 2, 2024		
Jurassic World Evolution 2	Business simulation	Frontier Developments	Frontier Developments	Nov 2021	Nov 9, 2021	Nov 9, 2021		
Jurassic World Evolution 3	Construction and management simulation	Frontier Developments	Frontier Developments	Oct 21, 2025	Oct 21, 2025	Oct 21, 2025		
Jusant	Puzzle; Platform	Don't Nod	Don't Nod	Oct 31, 2023	Oct 31, 2023	Oct 31, 2023		
Just Dance 2021	Music	Ubisoft Paris	Ubisoft	Nov 24, 2020	Nov 24, 2020	Nov 24, 2020	˄ OP	
Just Dance 2022	Music	Ubisoft Paris	Ubisoft	Nov 4, 2021	Nov 4, 2021	Nov 4, 2021	˄ OP	
Just Dance 2023 Edition	Music	Ubisoft Paris	Ubisoft	Nov 22, 2022	Nov 22, 2022	Nov 22, 2022		
Just Dance 2024 Edition	Music	Ubisoft Paris	Ubisoft	Oct 24, 2023	Oct 24, 2023	Oct 24, 2023		
Just Dance 2025 Edition	Music	Ubisoft Paris	Ubisoft	Oct 15, 2024	Oct 15, 2024	Oct 15, 2024		
Just Dance 2026 Edition	Music	Ubisoft Paris	Ubisoft	Oct 14, 2025	Oct 14, 2025	Oct 14, 2025		
Kao the Kangaroo	Platform	Tate Multimedia	Tate Multimedia	May 27, 2022	May 27, 2022	May 27, 2022		
Kerbal Space Program: Enhanced Edition	Space flight simulation	Squad	Private Division	Sep 29, 2021	Sep 29, 2021	Sep 29, 2021		
KeyWe	Puzzle	Stonewheat and Sons	Sold Out	Aug 31, 2021	Aug 31, 2021	Aug 31, 2021		
Killer Klowns from Outer Space: The Game	Survival Horror	IllFonic Teravision Games	IllFonic	Jun 4, 2024	Jun 4, 2024	Jun 4, 2024		
Killing Floor 3	Survival horror	Tripwire Interactive	Tripwire Interactive	Jul 24, 2025	Jul 24, 2025	Jul 24, 2025		
The King of Fighters XV	Fighting	SNK	SNK	Feb 17, 2022	Feb 17, 2022	Feb 17, 2022		
King of Meat	Action	Glowmade	Amazon Games	Oct 7, 2025	Oct 7, 2025	Oct 7, 2025		
Kingdom of Arcadia	Action-adventure	EastAsiaSoft	EastAsiaSoft	Apr 14, 2021	Apr 14, 2021	Apr 14, 2021		
Kingdom Come: Deliverance	Action role-playing	Warhorse Studios	Deep Silver	Feb 13, 2026	Feb 13, 2026	Feb 13, 2026		
Kingdom Come: Deliverance II	Action role-playing	Warhorse Studios	Deep Silver	Feb 4, 2025	Feb 4, 2025	Feb 4, 2025		
Kingdom Hearts IV	Role-playing	Square Enix Creative Business Unit I	Square Enix	TBA	TBA	TBA		
Kusan: City of Wolves	Top-down shooter	CIRCLEfromDOT	PQube	30 July 2026	30 July 2026	30 July 2026		
Lab Rat	Puzzle	Chump Squad	Chump Squad	2022	2022	2022		
Lake	Graphic adventure	Gamious	Whitethorn Games	Sep 1, 2021	Sep 1, 2021	Sep 1, 2021		
The Lamplighters League	Turn-based tactics	Harebrained Schemes	Paradox Interactive	Oct 3, 2023	Oct 3, 2023	Oct 3, 2023		
The Last Case of Benedict Fox	Metroidvania	Plot Twist	Rogue Games	Apr 27, 2023	Apr 27, 2023	Apr 27, 2023		
Last Oasis	Survival; MMO	Donkey Crew	Donkey Crew	Mar 26, 2021	Mar 26, 2021	Mar 26, 2021		
The Last Oricru	Action role-playing	GoldKnights	Prime Matter	Oct 13, 2022	Oct 13, 2022	Oct 13, 2022		
The Last Stand: Aftermath	Roguelike	Con Artist Games	Armor Games Studios	Unreleased	Nov 16, 2021	Nov 16, 2021		
Last Stop	Adventure	Variable State	Annapurna Interactive	Jul 22, 2021	Jul 22, 2021	Jul 22, 2021		
Lawn Mowing Simulator	Simulation	Skyhook Games	Curve Digital	Aug 11, 2021	Aug 11, 2021	Aug 11, 2021		
Lego Batman: Legacy of the Dark Knight	Action-adventure	TT Games	Warner Bros. Games	May 2026	May 2026	May 2026		
Lego Builder's Journey	Puzzle	Light Brick Studio	Lego Games	Nov 25, 2021	Nov 25, 2021	Nov 25, 2021		
Lego Party	Party	SMG Studio	Fictions	Sep 30, 2025	Sep 30, 2025	Sep 30, 2025		
Lego Skylines	City-building	Iceflake Studios	Paradox Interactive	TBA	TBA	TBA		
Lego Star Wars: The Skywalker Saga	Action-adventure	Traveller's Tales	WB Games	Apr 5, 2022	Apr 5, 2022	Apr 5, 2022	SD OP	
Lego Voyagers	Puzzle-platformer	Light Brick Studio	Annapurna Interactive	Sep 15, 2025	Sep 15, 2025	Sep 15, 2025		
Lemnis Gate	First-person shooter	Ratloop Games Canada	Frontier Foundry	Sep 28, 2021	Sep 28, 2021	Sep 28, 2021		
Let's School	Simulation video game	Pathea Games	Pathea Games, PM studios	Jul 16, 2024	Jul 16, 2024	Jul 16, 2024		
Let's Sing 2022	Music; Rhythm	Voxler	Ravenscourt; Plaion	Nov 23, 2021	Nov 23, 2021	Nov 23, 2021		
Let's Sing 2023	Music; Rhythm	Voxler	Ravenscourt; Plaion	Nov 15, 2022	Nov 15, 2022	Nov 15, 2022		
Let's Sing 2024	Music; Rhythm	Voxler	Ravenscourt; Plaion	Nov 7, 2023	Nov 7, 2023	Nov 7, 2023		
Lies of P	Soulslike; action role-playing	Round 8 Studio	Neowiz	Sep 18, 2023	Sep 18, 2023	Sep 18, 2023	SD OP	
Life Is Strange Remastered Collection	Adventure	Dontnod Entertainment; Deck Nine	Square Enix	Feb 2022	Feb 1, 2022	Feb 1, 2022		
Life Is Strange: Double Exposure	Adventure	Deck Nine	Square Enix	Oct 29, 2024	Oct 29, 2024	Oct 29, 2024		
Life Is Strange: Reunion	Adventure	Deck Nine	Square Enix	Mar 26, 2026	Mar 26, 2026	Mar 26, 2026		
Life Is Strange: True Colors	Adventure	Deck Nine	Square Enix	Sep 10, 2021	Sep 10, 2021	Sep 10, 2021		
Like a Dragon: Infinite Wealth	Role-playing	Ryu Ga Gotoku Studio	Sega	Jan 26, 2024	Jan 26, 2024	Jan 26, 2024		
Like a Dragon Gaiden: The Man Who Erased His Name	Action-adventure	Ryu Ga Gotoku Studio	Sega	Nov 9, 2023	Nov 9, 2023	Nov 9, 2023		
Like a Dragon: Ishin!	Action-adventure	Ryu Ga Gotoku Studio	Sega	Feb 22, 2023	Feb 21, 2023	Feb 21, 2023		
Like a Dragon: Pirate Yakuza in Hawaii	Action-adventure; beat 'em up; hack and slash	Ryu Ga Gotoku Studio	Sega	Feb 21, 2025	Feb 21, 2025	Feb 21, 2025		
Lil' Guardsman	Puzzle	Hilltop Studios	Versus Evil, TinyBuild	Unreleased	Jan 23, 2024	Jan 23, 2024		
Lisa: Definitive Edition	Role-playing	Dingaling Productions	Serenity Forge	Unreleased	Jul 18, 2023	Jul 18, 2023		
Little Kitty, Big City	Adventure	Double Dagger Studio	Double Dagger Studio	May 9, 2024	May 9, 2024	May 9, 2024		
Little Nightmares Enhanced Edition	Puzzle-platform; Survival horror	Tarsier Studios; Engine Software	Bandai Namco Entertainment	Oct 10, 2025	Oct 10, 2025	Oct 10, 2025		
Little Nightmares II	Puzzle-platformer; Survival horror	Tarsier Studios	Bandai Namco Entertainment	Feb 11, 2021	Feb 11, 2021	Feb 11, 2021	˄	
Little Nightmares III	Puzzle-platformer; Survival horror	Supermassive Games	Bandai Namco Entertainment	Oct 10, 2025	Oct 10, 2025	Oct 10, 2025		
Little Noah: Scion of Paradise	Action role-playing; Platform	Cygames; Grounding	Cygames	Nov 1, 2023	Nov 1, 2023	Nov 1, 2023	SD PA OP	
Little Witch in the Woods	Life simulation	Sunny Side Up	Sunny Side Up	Sep 15, 2025	Sep 15, 2025	Sep 15, 2025		
Llamasoft: The Jeff Minter Story	Arcade	Digital Eclipse	Digital Eclipse	Mar 13, 2024	Mar 13, 2024	Mar 13, 2024		
Looney Tunes: Wacky World of Sports	Sports	Bamtang Games	GameMill Entertainment	Sep 27, 2024	Sep 27, 2024	Sep 27, 2024		
The Lord of the Rings: Gollum	Action-adventure	Daedalic Entertainment	Daedalic Entertainment	May 25, 2023	May 25, 2023	May 25, 2023		
The Lord of the Rings: Return to Moria	Survival	Free Range Games	North Beach Games	Aug 27, 2024	Aug 27, 2024	Aug 27, 2024		
Lost in Random	Action-adventure	Zoink	Electronic Arts	Sep 10, 2021	Sep 10, 2021	Sep 10, 2021		
Lost Judgment	Action-adventure	Ryu Ga Gotoku Studio	Sega	Sep 24, 2021	Sep 24, 2021	Sep 24, 2021		
Luto	Action-adventure	Broken Bird Games	Selecta Play	Jul 22, 2025	Jul 22, 2025	Jul 22, 2025		
Madden NFL 21	Sports	EA Tiburon	Electronic Arts	Dec 4, 2020	Dec 4, 2020	Dec 4, 2020	EN OP XP	
Madden NFL 22	Sports	EA Tiburon	Electronic Arts	Aug 20, 2021	Aug 20, 2021	Aug 20, 2021	XP	
Madden NFL 23	Sports	EA Tiburon	Electronic Arts	Aug 19, 2022	Aug 19, 2022	Aug 19, 2022		
Madden NFL 24	Sports	EA Tiburon	Electronic Arts	Aug 18, 2023	Aug 18, 2023	Aug 18, 2023	XP	
Madden NFL 25	Sports	EA Tiburon	Electronic Arts	Aug 16, 2024	Aug 16, 2024	Aug 16, 2024	XP	
Madden NFL 26	Sports	EA Tiburon	Electronic Arts	Aug 14, 2025	Aug 14, 2025	Aug 14, 2025		
Maid of Sker	Survival horror	Wales Interactive	Wales Interactive	Unreleased	May 26, 2021	May 26, 2021		
The Making of Karateka	Action-adventure	Digital Eclipse	Digital Eclipse	Aug 29, 2023	Aug 29, 2023	Aug 29, 2023		
Maneater	Action role-playing	Tripwire Interactive; Blindside Interactive	Tripwire Interactive; Deep Silver	Nov 10, 2020	Nov 10, 2020	Nov 10, 2020	SD	
Manifold Garden	Puzzle	William Chyr Studio	William Chyr Studio	Nov 10, 2020	Nov 10, 2020	Nov 10, 2020	SD OP	
Manor Lords	City-builder; Real-time tactics	Slavic Magic	Hooded Horse	TBA	TBA	TBA		
Maquette	Puzzle-platform	Graceful Decay	Annapurna Interactive	Jul 19, 2023	Jul 19, 2023	Jul 19, 2023	SD OP	
Marathon	First-person shooter	Bungie	Bungie	Mar 5, 2026	Mar 5, 2026	Mar 5, 2026		
Martha is Dead	Psychological horror	LKA	Wired Productions	Feb 24, 2022	Feb 24, 2022	Feb 24, 2022	SD OP	
Marvel Cosmic Invasion	Beat 'em up	Tribute Games	Dotemu	Dec 1, 2025	Dec 1, 2025	Dec 1, 2025		
Marvel Rivals	Hero shooter	NetEase Games	NetEase Games	Dec 6, 2024	Dec 6, 2024	Dec 6, 2024		
Marvel MaXimum Collection	Beat 'em up	Limited Run Games	Limited Run Games	Mar 27, 2026	Mar 27, 2026	Mar 27, 2026		
Matchpoint: Tennis Championships	Sports	Torus Games	Kalypso Media	2022	2022	2022		
Maximum Football	Sports	Invictus Games	Modus Games	Jun 17, 2025	Jun 17, 2025	Jun 17, 2025		
MechWarrior 5: Mercenaries	Vehicle simulation	Piranha Games	Piranha Games	May 27, 2021	May 27, 2021	May 27, 2021		
The Medium	Psychological horror	Bloober Team	Bloober Team	Jan 28, 2021	Jan 28, 2021	Jan 28, 2021	OP	
Mega Man: Dual Override	Platform	Capcom	Capcom	2027	2027	2027		
Mega Man Star Force Legacy Collection	Role-playing; turn-based	Capcom	Capcom	Mar 27, 2026	Mar 27, 2026	Mar 27, 2026		
Metal Eden	First-person shooter	Reikon Games	Deep Silver	Sep 2, 2025	Sep 2, 2025	Sep 2, 2025		
Metal Gear Solid Delta: Snake Eater	Action-adventure; Stealth	Konami	Konami	Aug 28, 2025	Aug 28, 2025	Aug 28, 2025		
Metal Gear Solid Master Collection Vol. 1	Action-adventure; Stealth	Konami	Konami	Oct 24, 2023	Oct 24, 2023	Oct 24, 2023		
Metal Gear Solid: Master Collection Vol. 2	Action-adventure; Stealth	Konami	Konami	Aug 27, 2026	Aug 27, 2026	Aug 27, 2026		
Metal: Hellsinger	First-person shooter; rhythm	The Outriders	Funcom	Sep 15, 2022	Sep 15, 2022	Sep 15, 2022		
Metaphor: ReFantazio	Role-playing	Studio Zero	Sega	Oct 11, 2024	Oct 11, 2024	Oct 11, 2024	PA	
Metro Exodus Complete Edition	First-person shooter; survival horror	4A Games	Deep Silver	Jun 18, 2021	Jun 18, 2021	Jun 18, 2021		
A Memoir Blue	Interactive drama	Cloisters Interactive	Annapurna Interactive	Unreleased	TBA	TBA		
Mewgenics	Tactical role-playing; Roguelike; Life simulation	Edmund McMillen, Tyler Glaiel	Nicalis	Sep 8, 2026	Sep 8, 2026	Sep 8, 2026		
Microsoft Flight Simulator	Amateur flight simulation	Asobo Studio	Xbox Game Studios	Jul 27, 2021	Jul 27, 2021	Jul 27, 2021		
Microsoft Flight Simulator 2024	Amateur flight simulation	Asobo Studio	Xbox Game Studios	Nov 19, 2024	Nov 19, 2024	Nov 19, 2024		
Mighty Morphin Power Rangers: Rita's Rewind	Side-scroller; Beat 'em up	Digital Eclipse	Digital Eclipse	Unreleased	Dec 10, 2024	Dec 10, 2024		
Mina the Hollower	Action-adventure	Yacht Club Games	Yacht Club Games	May 29, 2026	May 29, 2026	May 29, 2026		
MindsEye	Action-adventure	Build a Rocket Boy	IOI Partners	Jun 10, 2025	Jun 10, 2025	Jun 10, 2025		
Minecraft: Bedrock Edition	Sandbox; Survival	Mojang Studios / Xbox Game Studios	Xbox Game Studios	Jun 17, 2025	Jun 17, 2025	Jun 17, 2025	XP SD OP	
Mio: Memories in Orbit	Metroidvania	Douze Dixièmes	Focus Entertainment	Jan 20, 2026	Jan 20, 2026	Jan 20, 2026	PA	
MLB The Show 21	Sports	San Diego Studio	Sony Interactive Entertainment	Apr 20, 2021	Apr 20, 2021	Apr 20, 2021		
MLB The Show 22	Sports	San Diego Studio	Sony Interactive Entertainment	Apr 5, 2022	Apr 5, 2022	Apr 5, 2022		
MLB The Show 23	Sports	San Diego Studio	Sony Interactive Entertainment	Mar 28, 2023	Mar 28, 2023	Mar 28, 2023	OP XP	
MLB The Show 24	Sports	San Diego Studio	Sony Interactive Entertainment	Mar 19, 2024	Mar 19, 2024	Mar 19, 2024		
MLB The Show 25	Sports	San Diego Studio	Sony Interactive Entertainment|MLB Advanced Media	Mar 18, 2025	Mar 18, 2025	Mar 18, 2025		
MLB The Show 26	Sports	San Diego Studio	Sony Interactive Entertainment	Mar 17, 2026	Mar 17, 2026	Mar 17, 2026		
Monaco 2	Stealth; Action	Pocketwatch Games	Humble Games	Apr 10, 2025	Apr 10, 2025	Apr 10, 2025		
Mortal Kombat 1	Fighting	NetherRealm Studios	Warner Bros. Games	Unreleased	Sep 19, 2023	Sep 19, 2023		
Mortal Kombat 11 Ultimate	Fighting	NetherRealm Studios	WB Games	Unreleased	Nov 17, 2020	Nov 17, 2020		
Mortal Kombat: Legacy Kollection	Fighting	Digital Eclipse	Digital Eclipse	Oct 30, 2025	Oct 30, 2025	Oct 30, 2025		
Mortal Shell: Enhanced Edition	Action role-playing	Cold Symmetry	Playstack	Unreleased	Mar 4, 2021	Mar 4, 2021		
Morkredd	Puzzle	Hyper Games	Aspyr	Dec 11, 2020	Dec 11, 2020	Dec 11, 2020		
Monopoly Madness	Board game	Engine Software	Ubisoft	Dec 8, 2021	Dec 9, 2021	Dec 9, 2021		
Monster Boy and the Cursed Kingdom	Platform	Game Atelier	FDG Entertainment	Aug 2, 2022	Aug 2, 2022	Aug 2, 2022		
Monster Energy Supercross: The Official Videogame 4	Racing	Milestone	Milestone	Mar 11, 2021	Mar 11, 2021	Mar 11, 2021		
Monster Jam Showdown	Racing	Milestone	THQ Nordic	Aug 29, 2024	Aug 29, 2024	Aug 29, 2024		
Monster Hunter Rise	Action role-playing	Capcom	Capcom	Jan 20, 2023	Jan 20, 2023	Jan 20, 2023		
Monster Hunter Wilds	Action role-playing	Capcom	Capcom	Feb 28, 2025	Feb 28, 2025	Feb 28, 2025		
Moonglow Bay	Fishing; Role-playing	Bunnyhug	Coatsink	Oct 26, 2021	Oct 26, 2021	Oct 26, 2021	SD PA OP	
The Mooseman	Adventure	Morteshka	Sometimes You	Mar 16, 2022	Mar 16, 2022	Mar 16, 2022		
Moto Roader MC	Racing	Masaya Games; Shinyuden	Ratalaika Games	Feb 25, 2022	Feb 25, 2022	Feb 25, 2022		
MotoGP 21	Racing	Milestone	Milestone	May 12, 2021	Apr 22, 2021	Apr 22, 2021		
MotoGP 22	Racing	Milestone	Milestone	Apr 28, 2022	Apr 21, 2022	Apr 21, 2022		
MotoGP 23	Racing	Milestone	Milestone	Jun 8, 2023	Jun 8, 2023	Jun 8, 2023		
MotoGP 24	Racing	Milestone	Milestone	May 2, 2024	May 2, 2024	May 2, 2024		
MotoGP 25	Racing	Milestone	Milestone	Apr 30, 2025	Apr 30, 2025	Apr 30, 2025		
MotoGP 26	Racing	Milestone	Milestone	Apr 29, 2026	Apr 29, 2026	Apr 29, 2026		
Mouse: P.I. For Hire	First-person shooter	Fumi Games	PlaySide Studios	Mar 19, 2026	Mar 19, 2026	Mar 19, 2026		
Moving Out 2	Action; puzzle	DevM Games; SMG Studio	Team17	Aug 15, 2023	Aug 15, 2023	Aug 15, 2023		
Mr. Driller Drill Land	Puzzle	Bandai Namco Entertainment	Bandai Namco Entertainment	Nov 4, 2021	Nov 4, 2021	Nov 4, 2021		
MultiVersus	Fighting	Player First Games	Warner Bros. Games	May 28, 2024	May 28, 2024	May 28, 2024		
Mundaun	Adventure; horror	Hidden Fields	MVM Interactive	Mar 16, 2021	Mar 16, 2021	Mar 16, 2021		
MX vs. ATV Legends	Racing	Rainbow Studios	THQ Nordic	Jun 28, 2022	Jun 28, 2022	Jun 28, 2022		
Mystic Pathways: Crystal Quest	Puzzle	Afil Games	Afil Games	Jul 2, 2025	Jul 2, 2025	Jul 2, 2025		
My Time at Evershine	Simulation; role-playing	Pathea Games	Pathea Games	TBA	TBA	TBA		
My Time at Sandrock	Role-playing	Pathea Games	Pathea Games	Jun 19, 2024	Jun 19, 2024	Jun 19, 2024		
Naraka: Bladepoint	Action-Adventure	24 Entertainment	NetEase Game, ThunderFire Universe X Studio	Jun 23, 2022	Jun 23, 2022	Jun 23, 2022		
NASCAR 21: Ignition	Racing	Motorsport Games	Motorsport Games	Jun 23, 2022	Jun 23, 2022	Jun 23, 2022		
NASCAR 25	Racing	IRacing Studios	iRacing	Oct 14, 2025	Oct 14, 2025	Oct 14, 2025		
Nascar Arcade Rush	Racing	Team6 Game Studios	GameMill Entertainment	Sep 15, 2023	Sep 15, 2023	Sep 15, 2023	SD OP	
NBA 2K21	Sports	Visual Concepts	2K Sports	Nov 10, 2020	Nov 10, 2020	Nov 10, 2020		
NBA 2K22	Sports	Visual Concepts	2K Sports	Sep 10, 2021	Sep 10, 2021	Sep 10, 2021		
NBA 2K23	Sports	Visual Concepts	2K Sports	Sep 9, 2022	Sep 9, 2022	Sep 9, 2022		
NBA 2K24	Sports	Visual Concepts	2K Sports	Sep 8, 2023	Sep 8, 2023	Sep 8, 2023		
NBA 2K25	Sports	Visual Concepts	2K Sports	Sep 6, 2024	Sep 6, 2024	Sep 6, 2024		
NBA 2K26	Sports	Visual Concepts	2K Sports	Sep 5, 2025	Sep 5, 2025	Sep 5, 2025		
Need for Speed Unbound	Racing	Criterion Games	Electronic Arts	Dec 2, 2022	Dec 2, 2022	Dec 2, 2022		
Nerf Legends	First-person shooter	Fun Labs	GameMill Entertainment	Nov 18, 2021	Nov 19, 2021	Nov 19, 2021		
NHL 22	Sports	EA Vancouver	Electronic Arts	Oct 15, 2021	Oct 15, 2021	Oct 15, 2021		
NHL 23	Sports	EA Vancouver	EA Sports	Oct 14, 2022	Oct 14, 2022	Oct 14, 2022		
NHL 24	Sports	EA Vancouver	EA Sports	Oct 6, 2023	Oct 6, 2023	Oct 6, 2023		
NHL 25	Sports	EA Vancouver	EA Sports	Oct 4, 2024	Oct 4, 2024	Oct 4, 2024		
NHL 26	Sports	EA Vancouver	EA Sports	Sep 12, 2025	Sep 12, 2025	Sep 12, 2025		
Nickelodeon All-Star Brawl	Fighting	Fair Play Labs; Ludosity	NA: GameMill Entertainment; EU: Maximum Games	Unreleased	Oct 5, 2021	Oct 5, 2021		
Nickelodeon All-Star Brawl 2	Fighting	Fair Play Labs	NA: GameMill Entertainment; EU: Maximum Games	Nov 13, 2023	Nov 7, 2023	Nov 7, 2023		
Nickelodeon Kart Racers 3: Slime Speedway	Kart racing	Bamtang Games	NA: GameMill Entertainment; EU: Maximum Games	Oct 12, 2022	Oct 7, 2022	Oct 7, 2022		
Ninja Gaiden II Black	Action-adventure; Hack and slash	Team Ninja	Koei Tecmo	Jan 23, 2025	Jan 23, 2025	Jan 23, 2025		
Ninja Gaiden 4	Action-adventure; Hack and slash	Team Ninja; PlatinumGames	Xbox Game Studios	Oct 21, 2025	Oct 21, 2025	Oct 21, 2025		
Ninja Gaiden: Ragebound	Hack and slash; Platform	The Game Kitchen	Dotemu	Jul 31, 2025	Jul 31, 2025	Jul 31, 2025	SD OP	
Necromunda: Hired Gun	First-person shooter	Streum On Studio	Focus Home Interactive	Unreleased	Jun 1, 2021	Jun 1, 2021		
Neptunia: Sisters vs. Sisters	Role-playing	Compile Heart	Idea Factory	May 21, 2024	May 21, 2024	May 21, 2024		
Nikoderiko: The Magical World	3D platformer; Action-adventure	Vea Games	Knights Peak	Oct 2024	Oct 2024	Oct 2024		
Nobody Saves the World	Role-playing	Drinkbox Studios	Drinkbox Studios	Jan 18, 2022	Jan 18, 2022	Jan 18, 2022		
Nobody Wants to Die	Adventure	Critical Hit Games	Plaion	Unreleased	Jul 17, 2024	Jul 17, 2024		
No Man's Sky	Action-adventure; survival	Hello Games	Hello Games	Nov 10, 2020	Nov 10, 2020	Nov 10, 2020		
No More Heroes III	Action-adventure	Grasshopper Manufacture	Marvelous	Oct 6, 2022	Oct 11, 2022	Oct 14, 2022		
No Sleep for Kaname Date – From AI: The Somnium Files	Adventure; Visual novel; Escape room	Spike Chunsoft	Spike Chunsoft	Feb 26, 2026	Feb 26, 2026	Feb 26, 2026		
Norco	Adventure	Geography of Robots	Raw Fury	Nov 17, 2022	Nov 17, 2022	Nov 17, 2022	SD PA OP	
Observer: System Redux	Psychological horror	Bloober Team	Aspyr	Nov 10, 2020	Nov 10, 2020	Nov 10, 2020		
Octopath Traveler 0	Role-playing	Square Enix; DokiDoki Groove Works	Square Enix	Dec 4, 2025	Dec 4, 2025	Dec 4, 2025		
Octopath Traveler II	Role-playing	Square Enix; Acquire	Square Enix	Jun 5, 2024	Jun 5, 2024	Jun 5, 2024		
OlliOlli World	Sports	Roll7	Private Division	Feb 8, 2022	Feb 8, 2022	Feb 2022		
Once Upon a Katamari	Puzzle; Action	Bandai Namco Entertainment	Bandai Namco Entertainment	Oct 24, 2025	Oct 24, 2025	Oct 24, 2025		
One Piece Odyssey	Role-playing	ILCA	Bandai Namco Entertainment	Jan 12, 2023	Jan 13, 2023	Jan 13, 2023		
One Piece: Pirate Warriors 4	Action-adventure; Beat 'em up	Omega Force	Bandai Namco Entertainment	Nov 21, 2025	Nov 21, 2025	Nov 21, 2025		
Onimusha: Way of the Sword	Action-adventure	Capcom	Capcom	Sep 25, 2026	Sep 25, 2026	Sep 25, 2026		
Öoo	Puzzle-platform	Nama Takahashi	Hachinos	Mar 18, 2026	Mar 18, 2026	Mar 18, 2026		
Orphan of the Machine	Metroidvania	Dynamic Voltage Games	Dynamic Voltage Games	TBA	TBA	TBA		
Outbound	Adventure	Square Glade Games	Silver Lining Games	Apr 23, 2026	Apr 23, 2026	Apr 23, 2026		
Outcast : A New Beginning	Action-adventure	Appeal	THQ Nordic	Mar 15, 2024	Mar 15, 2024	Mar 15, 2024		
Out of Words	Platform; Adventure	Kong Orange; Wired Fly	Epic Games Publishing	2026	2026	2026		
The Outer Worlds: Spacer's Choice Edition	Action role-playing	Obsidian Entertainment	Private Division	Mar 7, 2023	Mar 7, 2023	Mar 7, 2023		
The Outer Worlds 2	Action role-playing	Obsidian Entertainment	Xbox Game Studios	Oct 29, 2025	Oct 29, 2025	Oct 29, 2025		
The Outlast Trials	Survival horror	Red Barrels	Red Barrels	Mar 5, 2024	Mar 5, 2024	Mar 5, 2024		
Outriders	Third-person shooter	People Can Fly	Square Enix	Apr 1, 2021	Apr 1, 2021	Apr 1, 2021	SD OP	
Overcooked! All You Can Eat	Simulation	Ghost Town Games; Team17	Team17	Nov 10, 2020	Nov 10, 2020	Nov 10, 2020		
Override 2: Super Mech League	Beat 'em up	Modus Studios Brazil	Modus Games	Dec 22, 2020	Dec 22, 2020	Dec 22, 2020		
Overwatch 2	First-person shooter; Hero shooter	Blizzard Entertainment	Blizzard Entertainment	Aug 10, 2023	Aug 10, 2023	Aug 10, 2023		
Paleo Pines	Farm life sim	Italic Pig	Modus Games	Sep 26, 2023	Sep 26, 2023	Sep 26, 2023		
Palworld	Survival; Monster-taming	Pocketpair	Pocketpair	Jul 10, 2026	Jul 10, 2026	Jul 10, 2026		
Park Beyond	Construction and management simulation	Limbic Entertainment	Bandai Namco Entertainment	Jun 16, 2023	Jun 16, 2023	Jun 16, 2023		
Party Crasher Simulator	Simulation	Glob Games Studio	Glob Games Studio	2021	2021	2021		
Path of Exile 2	Action role-playing	Grinding Gear Games	Grinding Gear Games	TBA	TBA	TBA		
The Pathless	Action-adventure	Giant Squid	Annapurna Interactive	Feb 2, 2023	Feb 2, 2023	Feb 2, 2023		
Payday 3	First-person shooter	Starbreeze Studios	Deep Silver	Sep 21, 2023	Sep 21, 2023	Sep 21, 2023		
The Pedestrian	Puzzle-platform	Skookum Arts	Skookum Arts	Jan 4, 2022	Jan 4, 2022	Jan 4, 2022		
Penny's Big Breakaway	Platform; Action	Evening Star	Pirate Division	Feb 21, 2024	Feb 21, 2024	Feb 21, 2024		
Penny Blood	Role-playing	Yukikaze; Shade; Studio Wildrose	—N/a	TBA	TBA	TBA		
The Persistence Enhanced	Action-adventure	Firesprite	Perp Games	Jun 24, 2021	Jun 24, 2021	Jun 24, 2021		
Persona 3 Portable	Role-playing	Atlus	Sega	Jan 19, 2023	Jan 19, 2023	Jan 19, 2023		
Persona 3 Reload	Role-playing	P-studio	Sega	Feb 2, 2024	Feb 2, 2024	Feb 2, 2024		
Persona 4 Golden	Role-playing	Atlus	Sega	Jan 19, 2023	Jan 19, 2023	Jan 19, 2023		
Persona 4 Revival	Role-playing	P-Studio	WW: Sega; JP: Atlus	Feb 18, 2027	Feb 18, 2027	Feb 18, 2027		
Persona 5 Royal	Role-playing	Atlus	Sega	Oct 21, 2022	Oct 21, 2022	Oct 21, 2022		
Persona 5 Tactica	Tactical role-playing	P-Studio	Atlus	Nov 17, 2023	Nov 17, 2023	Nov 17, 2023		
Persona 6	Role-playing	P-Studio	Sega	TBA	TBA	TBA		
Phantasy Star Online 2: New Genesis	Action role-playing	Sega	Sega	TBA	Jun 9, 2021	TBA	OP	
Phantom Abyss	Action-adventure	Team WIBY	Devolver Digital	Oct 19, 2022	Jan 25, 2024	Jan 25, 2024		
Phoenotopia: Awakening	Action-adventure; Metroidvania; Platformer	Cape Cosmic	Flyhigh Works	Aug 25, 2021	Aug 25, 2021	Aug 25, 2021		
Pico Park 2	Multiplayer action-puzzler	TECOPARK	TECOPARK	Sep 12, 2024	Sep 12, 2024	Sep 12, 2024		
Pinball Fx	Simulation	Zen Studios	Zen Studios	Feb 16, 2023	Feb 16, 2023	Feb 16, 2023	SD OP	
Planet Coaster: Console Edition	Construction and management simulation	Frontier Developments	Frontier Developments	Nov 10, 2020	Nov 10, 2020	Nov 10, 2020		
Planet Coaster 2	Construction and management simulation	Frontier Developments	Frontier Developments	Nov 6, 2024	Nov 6, 2024	Nov 6, 2024		
Planet Zoo: Console Edition	Construction and management simulation	Frontier Developments	Frontier Developments	Mar 26, 2024	Mar 26, 2024	Mar 26, 2024		
Planet of Lana	Platform	Wishfully Studios	Thunderful Publishing	May 23, 2023	May 23, 2023	May 23, 2023		
PO'ed: Definitive Edition	First-person shooter	Nightdive Studios	Nightdive Studios	Unreleased	May 16, 2024	May 16, 2024		
Pocky & Rocky Reshrined	Scrolling shooter	Natsume Atari	ININ	Dec 17, 2023	Dec 17, 2023	Dec 17, 2023		
Port Royale 4	Real-time strategy	Gaming Minds Studios	Kalypso Media	Sep 10, 2021	Sep 10, 2021	Sep 10, 2021		
PowerWash Simulator	Simulation	FuturLab	Square Enix Collective	Jul 14, 2022	Jul 14, 2022	Jul 14, 2022	SD OP	
PowerWash Simulator 2	Simulation	FuturLab	FuturLab	Oct 23, 2025	Oct 23, 2025	Oct 23, 2025		
Pragmata	Action-adventure	Capcom	Capcom	Apr 17, 2026	Apr 17, 2026	Apr 17, 2026		
Predecessor	Multiplayer online battle arena	Omeda Studios	Omeda Studios	Aug 20, 2024	Aug 20, 2024	Aug 20, 2024		
Psychonauts 2	3D platformer; Action-adventure game; Action-adventure	Double Fine	Xbox Game Studios	Aug 25, 2021	Aug 25, 2021	Aug 25, 2021	SD OP	
PUBG: Battlegrounds	Battle royale	PUBG Studios	Krafton	Nov 13, 2025	Nov 13, 2025	Nov 13, 2025		
Pupperazzi	Photography	Sundae Month	Kitfox Games	Jan 20, 2022	Jan 20, 2022	Jan 20, 2022		
Puyo Puyo Tetris 2	Puzzle	Sonic Team	Sega	Dec 10, 2020	Dec 8, 2020	Dec 8, 2020	SD	
Qomp2	Puzzle-platform	Graphite Lab	Atari	Feb 20, 2024	Feb 20, 2024	Feb 20, 2024	SD OP	
Quantum Error	First-person shooter	TeamKill Media	TeamKill Media	TBA	TBA	TBA		
Raidou Remastered: The Mystery of the Soulless Army	Action role-playing	Atlus	Atlus	Jun 19, 2025	Jun 19, 2025	Jun 19, 2025		
Relooted	Action-platformer	Nyamakop	Nyamakop	Feb 12, 2026	Feb 12, 2026	Feb 12, 2026		
Read Only Memories: Neurodiver	Adventure	MidBoss	MidBoss	2022	2022	2022		
Ready or Not	First-person shooter; Tactical shooter	VOID Interactive	VOID Interactive	Jul 15, 2025	Jul 15, 2025	Jul 15, 2025		
Reanimal	Survival horror; Cinematic platformer	Tarsier Studios	THQ Nordic	Feb 13, 2026	Feb 13, 2026	Feb 13, 2026	PA	
Record of Lodoss War: Deedlit in Wonder Labyrinth	Metroidvania	Team Ladybug; Why So Serious?	Playism	Dec 16, 2021	Dec 16, 2021	Dec 16, 2021		
Recompile	Metroidvania	Phigames	Dear Villagers	Aug 19, 2021	Aug 19, 2021	Aug 19, 2021		
Rec Room	Virtual world	Rec Room Inc.	Rec Room Inc.	Dec 3, 2020	Dec 3, 2020	Dec 3, 2020	XP	
Red Dead Redemption	Action-adventure	Rockstar San Diego; Double Eleven; Cast Iron Games	Rockstar Games	Dec 2, 2025	Dec 2, 2025	Dec 2, 2025		
Redfall	Tactical shooter	Arkane Studios	Bethesda Softworks	May 2, 2023	May 2, 2023	May 2, 2023		
Red Solstice 2: Survivors Ultimate Edition	Survival; Strategy	Ironward	505 Games	Jan 23, 2025	Jan 23, 2025	Jan 23, 2025		
Relicta	Puzzle	Mighty Polygon	Ravenscourt	Apr 26, 2021	Apr 26, 2021	Apr 26, 2021	SD	
Rematch	Sports	Sloclap	Sloclap; Kepler Interactive	Jun 19, 2025	Jun 19, 2025	Jun 19, 2025		
Replaced	Action; Platform	Sad Cat Studios	Coatsink; Thunderful Publishing	2026	2026	2026		
RESEARCH and DESTROY	Turn-based strategy	Implausible Industries	Spike Chunsoft	Apr 26, 2022	Apr 25, 2022	Apr 25, 2022	SD	
Resident Evil 2	Survival horror	Capcom	Capcom	Jun 13, 2022	Jun 13, 2022	Jun 13, 2022		
Resident Evil 3	Survival horror	Capcom	Capcom	Jun 13, 2022	Jun 13, 2022	Jun 13, 2022		
Resident Evil 4	Survival horror	Capcom	Capcom	Mar 24, 2023	Mar 24, 2023	Mar 24, 2023		
Resident Evil 7: Biohazard	Survival horror	Capcom	Capcom	Jun 13, 2022	Jun 13, 2022	Jun 13, 2022		
Resident Evil Requiem	Survival horror	Capcom	Capcom	Feb 27, 2026	Feb 27, 2026	Feb 27, 2026		
Resident Evil Village	Survival horror	Capcom	Capcom	May 7, 2021	May 7, 2021	May 7, 2021		
Revenge of the Savage Planet	Action-adventure	Raccoon Logic	Raccoon Logic	May 8, 2025	May 8, 2025	May 8, 2025		
Ride 4	Racing	Milestone	Milestone	Jan 21, 2021	Jan 21, 2021	Jan 21, 2021	SD OP	
Ride 5	Racing	Milestone	Milestone	Aug 24, 2023	Aug 24, 2023	Aug 24, 2023		
Ride 6	Racing	Milestone	Milestone	Feb 12, 2026	Feb 12, 2026	Feb 12, 2026		
Riders Republic	Extreme sports	Ubisoft Annecy	Ubisoft	Oct 28, 2021	Oct 28, 2021	Oct 28, 2021	SD OP	
RiMS Racing	Racing	RaceWard Studio	Nacon	Aug 19, 2021	Aug 19, 2021	Aug 19, 2021		
River City Girls 2	Beat 'em up	WayForward	Arc System Works	Dec 1, 2022	Dec 1, 2022	Dec 1, 2022		
Road 96	Adventure	DigixArt	DigixArt	Jun 16, 2022	Apr 13, 2022	Apr 13, 2022		
RoboCop: Rogue City	First-person shooter	Teyon	Nacon	Nov 2, 2023	Nov 2, 2023	Nov 2, 2023		
Roboquest	First-person shooter; roguelike	RyseUp Studios	RyseUp Studios	Nov 7, 2023	Nov 7, 2023	Nov 7, 2023		
Roguebook	Roguelike deck-building game	Abrakam Entertainment	Nancon	Feb 24, 2022	Feb 24, 2022	Feb 24, 2022		
Rogue Company	Third-person shooter	First Watch Games	Hi-Rez Studios	Nov 10, 2020	Nov 10, 2020	Nov 10, 2020		
RollerCoaster Tycoon 3: Complete Edition	Construction and management simulation	Frontier Developments	Atari	Mar 20, 2025	Mar 20, 2025	Mar 20, 2025	SD OP	
Routine	Survival horror	Lunar Software	Raw Fury	Dec 4, 2025	Dec 4, 2025	Dec 4, 2025		
R-Type Final 2	Shoot 'em up	Granzella	JP: Granzella; WW: NIS America	Apr 29, 2021	Apr 30, 2021	Apr 30, 2021		
Rubber Bandits	Party	Flashbulb Games	Flashbulb Games	Dec 2, 2021	Dec 2, 2021	Dec 2, 2021		
Rugby 22	Sports	Eko Software	Nacon	Jan 2022	Jan 2022	Jan 2022		
Rugby League 26	Sports	Big Ant Studios	Nacon	Jul 17, 2025	Jul 17, 2025	Jul 17, 2025	SD OP	
Ruined King: A League of Legends Story	Role-playing	Airship Syndicate	Riot Forge	Nov 16, 2021	Nov 16, 2021	Nov 16, 2021		
Rumbleverse	Battle Royale	Iron Galaxy	Epic Games Publishing	Aug 11, 2022	Aug 11, 2022	Aug 11, 2022		
Rushing Beat X: Return of Brawl Brothers	Brawler	City Connection	City Connection	Mar 19, 2026	Mar 19, 2026	Mar 19, 2026		
RWBY: Arrowfell	Metroidvania	WayForward	Arc System Works	Unreleased	2022	2022		
S.T.A.L.K.E.R. 2: Heart of Chornobyl	First-person shooter; Survival horror	GSC Game World	GSC Game World	Nov 20, 2024	Nov 20, 2024	Nov 20, 2024		
Sable	Adventure	Shedworks	Raw Fury	Sep 23, 2021	Sep 23, 2021	Sep 23, 2021		
Sail Forth	Action-adventure	Festive Vector	Quantum Astrophysicists Guild	Dec 21, 2022	Dec 21, 2022	Dec 21, 2022		
Saint Kotar	Point-and-click adventure	The-Mark Entertainment	Soedesco	Nov 22, 2022	Nov 22, 2022	Nov 22, 2022	SD OP	
Saints Row	Action-adventure	Volition	Deep Silver	Aug 23, 2022	Aug 23, 2022	Aug 23, 2022		
Saints Row: The Third Remastered	Action-adventure	Volition	Deep Silver	May 25, 2021	May 25, 2021	May 25, 2021		
Samurai Shodown	Fighting	SNK	SNK	Mar 16, 2021	Mar 16, 2021	Mar 16, 2021		
Sand Land	Action role-playing	ILCA	Bandai Namco Entertainment	Apr 25, 2024	Apr 26, 2024	Apr 26, 2024		
Scarlet Nexus	Action role-playing	Bandai Namco Studios	Bandai Namco Entertainment	Jun 25, 2021	Jun 25, 2021	Jun 25, 2021	SD OP	
ScootX	Sports	Mash Games	Mash Games	Sep 18, 2025	Sep 18, 2025	Sep 18, 2025		
Scorn	First-person shooter; Survival horror	Ebb Software	Ebb Software	Oct 14, 2022	Oct 14, 2022	Oct 14, 2022	OP	
Scott Pilgrim EX	Beat 'em up	Tribute Games	Tribute Games	Mar 3, 2026	Mar 3, 2026	Mar 3, 2026		
Scott Pilgrim vs. The World: The Game - Complete Edition	Beat 'em up	Ubisoft; Engine Software	Ubisoft	Jan 14, 2021	Jan 14, 2021	Jan 14, 2021		
SCP-3008: Infinite Store	Action-adventure	YAP	Upscale Studio	Oct 23, 2026	Oct 23, 2026	Oct 23, 2026		
Screamer	Racing	Milestone	Plaion	Mar 26, 2026	Mar 26, 2026	Mar 26, 2026		
Sea of Thieves	Action-adventure	Rare	Xbox Game Studios	Mar 13, 2024	Mar 13, 2024	Mar 13, 2024	SD PA OP	
Senua's Saga: Hellblade II	Action-adventure	Ninja Theory	Xbox Game Studios	May 21, 2024	May 21, 2024	May 21, 2024		
Sephonie	Puzzle-platform	Analgesic Productions	Ratalaika Games	Jul 21, 2023	Jul 21, 2023	Jul 21, 2023		
Serious Sam 4	First-person shooter	Croteam	Devolver Digital	Dec 7, 2021	Dec 7, 2021	Dec 7, 2021	OP	
Session	Sports	Crea-ture Studio	Nacon	Sep 22, 2022	Sep 22, 2022	Sep 22, 2022		
Shadows of the Damned: Hella Remastered	Action-adventure	Grasshopper Manufacture	NetEase Entertainment Interactive	Oct 31, 2024	Oct 31, 2024	Oct 31, 2024		
Sherlock Holmes: The Awakened	Adventure	Frogwares	Frogwares	Apr 11, 2023	Apr 11, 2023	Apr 11, 2023		
Sherlock Holmes: Chapter One	Adventure	Frogwares	Frogwares	Nov 16, 2021	Nov 16, 2021	Nov 16, 2021		
Shredders	Sports	Foam Punch	Foam Punch	Feb 2022	Feb 2022	Feb 2022		
Silent Hill 2	Survival horror	Bloober Team	Konami Digital Entertainment	Nov 21, 2025	Nov 21, 2025	Nov 21, 2025		
Silt	Adventure; Puzzle	Spiral Circus	Fireshine Games	Jun 1, 2022	Jun 1, 2022	Jun 1, 2022	SD OP	
The Sinking City Remastered	Action-adventure; Survival horror	Frogwares	Frogwares	Feb 19, 2021	Feb 19, 2021	Feb 19, 2021		
The Sinking City 2	Survival horror	Frogwares	Frogwares	Aug 18, 2026	Aug 18, 2026	Aug 18, 2026		
Skull and Bones	Action-adventure game	Ubisoft Singapore	Ubisoft	Feb 16, 2024	Feb 16, 2024	Feb 16, 2024		
Skull Island: Rise of Kong	Action-adventure	IguanaBee	GameMill Entertainment	Oct 17, 2023	Oct 17, 2023	Oct 17, 2023	SD OP	
Slime Rancher 2	Adventure	Monomi Park	Monomi Park	Sep 23, 2025	Sep 23, 2025	Sep 23, 2025		
Slitterhead	Survival Horror; sealth	Bokeh Game Studio	Bokeh Game Studio	Nov 8, 2024	Nov 8, 2024	Nov 8, 2024		
Slave Zero X	Action	Poppy Works	Ziggurat Interactive	Feb 21, 2024	Feb 21, 2024	Feb 21, 2024		
Smalland: Survive the Wilds	Survival	Merge Games	Maximum Entertainment	Feb 15, 2024	Feb 15, 2024	Feb 15, 2024		
The Smurfs: Mission Vileaf	Action-adventure	OSome Studio	Microids	Unreleased	Dec 2, 2021	Dec 2, 2021		
Snaky Snakes	Action-adventure	Zakym	Zakym	Dec 8, 2025	Dec 8, 2025	Dec 8, 2025	SD PA OP	
Sniper Elite 5	Tactical shooter	Rebellion Developments	Rebellion Developments	2022	2022	2022		
Sniper Ghost Warrior Contracts 2	Tactical shooter; stealth	CI Games	CI Games	Jun 4, 2021	Jun 4, 2021	Jun 4, 2021		
SnowRunner	Simulation	Saber Interactive	Focus Home Interactive	May 31, 2022	May 31, 2022	May 31, 2022		
Soccer Golf	Puzzle	Petite Games	Ratalaika Games	May 22, 2025	May 22, 2025	May 22, 2025	SD OP	
Soulstice	Action role-playing	Reply Game Studios	Modus Games	Sep 20, 2022	Sep 20, 2022	Sep 20, 2022		
South of Midnight	Action-adventure	Compulsion Games	Xbox Game Studios	Apr 8, 2025	Apr 8, 2025	Apr 8, 2025		
Somerville	Adventure	JumpShip	JumpShip	Nov 15, 2022	Nov 15, 2022	Nov 15, 2022		
Song of Iron	Action-adventure	Escape	Escape	Aug 31, 2021	Aug 31, 2021	Aug 31, 2021		
Sonic Frontiers	Platform	Sonic Team	Sega	Nov 8, 2022	Nov 8, 2022	Nov 8, 2022	OP	
Sonic Origins	Platform	Sonic Team	Sega	Jun 23, 2022	Jun 23, 2022	Jun 23, 2022		
Sonic Origins Plus	Platform	Sonic Team	Sega	Jun 23, 2023	Jun 23, 2023	Jun 23, 2023		
Sonic Racing: CrossWorlds	Kart racing	Sonic Team	Sega	Sep 25, 2025	Sep 25, 2025	Sep 25, 2025		
Sonic Superstars	Platform	Arzest; Sonic Team	Sega	Oct 17, 2023	Oct 17, 2023	Oct 17, 2023		
Sonic X Shadow Generations	Platform	Sonic Team	Sega	Oct 25, 2024	Oct 25, 2024	Oct 25, 2024		
Spacelords	Action-adventure	MercurySteam	MercurySteam	Nov 10, 2020	Nov 10, 2020	Nov 10, 2020		
Spacelines from the Far Out	Roguelike, Party	Coffeenauts	Skystone Games	Jun 7, 2022	Jun 7, 2022	Jun 7, 2022	SD	
SpellForce 3 Reforced	Real-time strategy; role-playing	Grimlore Games	THQ Nordic	Dec 7, 2021	Dec 7, 2021	Dec 7, 2021		
Spelunky 2	Platform	Mossmouth, Blitworks	Mossmouth	Jan 13, 2022	Jan 13, 2022	Jan 13, 2022		
Spirit of the North: Enhanced Edition	Adventure	Infuse Studio	Merge Games	Jun 29, 2021	Jun 29, 2021	Jun 29, 2021		
Split Fiction	Action-adventure; Platform	Hazelight Studios	Electronic Arts	Mar 6, 2025	Mar 6, 2025	Mar 6, 2025		
Splitgate	First-Person Shooter	1047 Games	1047 Games	Jul 27, 2021	Jul 27, 2021	Jul 27, 2021		
SpongeBob SquarePants: The Cosmic Shake	Platform; action-adventure	Purple Lamp	THQ Nordic	Oct 24, 2023	Oct 24, 2023	Oct 24, 2023		
Squirrel with a Gun	Action-adventure	Dee Dee Creations	Maximum Entertainment	Oct 15, 2024	Oct 15, 2024	Oct 15, 2024		
State of Decay 3	Action-adventure; Survival horror	Undead Labs	Xbox Game Studios	2027	2027	2027	OP	
Station Manager	Simulation	Kairosoft	Kairosoft	Sep 15, 2023	Sep 15, 2023	Sep 15, 2023	PA OP	
SteamWorld Build	City-building; Dungeon crawl	The Station	Thunderful Publishing	Dec 1, 2023	Dec 1, 2023	Dec 1, 2023	SD OP	
Starfield	Action role-playing	Bethesda Game Studios	Bethesda Softworks	Sep 6, 2023	Sep 6, 2023	Sep 6, 2023		
Star Ocean: The Divine Force	Action role-playing	Tri-Ace	Square Enix	Oct 27, 2022	Oct 27, 2022	Oct 27, 2022		
Starsand Island	Life simulation	Seed Lab	Seed Lab	Feb 1, 2026	Feb 1, 2026	Feb 1, 2026		
Starseeker: Astroneer Expeditions	Adventure	System Era Softworks	Devolver Digital	2026	2026	2026		
Star Wars: Battlefront Classic Collection	First-person shooter; Third-person shooter	Aspyr	Aspyr	Unreleased	Mar 14, 2024	Mar 14, 2024		
Star Wars Episode I: Jedi Power Battles	Action	Aspyr	Aspyr	Unreleased	Jan 23, 2025	Jan 23, 2025		
Star Wars Jedi: Fallen Order	Action-adventure	Respawn Entertainment; Panic Button	Electronic Arts	Jun 11, 2021	Jun 11, 2021	Jun 11, 2021		
Star Wars Jedi: Survivor	Action-adventure	Respawn Entertainment	Electronic Arts	Apr 28, 2023	Apr 28, 2023	Apr 28, 2023		
Star Wars Outlaws	Action-adventure	Massive Entertainment	Ubisoft	Aug 30, 2024	Aug 30, 2024	Aug 30, 2024		
Stasis	Survival horror; Point-and-click adventure	The Brotherhood	Feardemic	Jun 26, 2025	Jun 26, 2025	Jun 26, 2025	SD OP	
Steelrising	Action role-playing; soulslike	Spiders	Nacon	Sep 8, 2022	Sep 8, 2022	Sep 8, 2022		
Stonefly	Action-adventure	Flight School Studios	MWM Interactive	Jun 1, 2021	Jun 1, 2021	Jun 1, 2021		
Stranger of Paradise: Final Fantasy Origin	Action role-playing; soulslike	Team Ninja	Square Enix	Mar 18, 2022	Mar 18, 2022	Mar 18, 2022		
Stranger Than Heaven	Action-adventure	RGG Studio	Sega	Jan 15, 2027	Jan 15, 2027	Jan 15, 2027		
Stray	Adventure	BlueTwelve Studio	Annapurna Interactive	Aug 10, 2023	Aug 10, 2023	Aug 10, 2023	OP	
Stray Blade	Action role-playing	Point Blank	505 Games	Apr 20, 2023	Apr 20, 2023	Apr 20, 2023		
Street Fighter 6	Fighting	Capcom	Capcom	Jun 2, 2023	Jun 2, 2023	Jun 2, 2023		
Stumble Guys	Party; Battle royale	Scopely	Scopely	Jan 23, 2024	Jan 23, 2024	Jan 23, 2024	SD OP	
Subnautica	Action-adventure	Unknown Worlds Entertainment	Gearbox Publishing	May 14, 2021	May 14, 2021	May 14, 2021	SD PA OP	
Subnautica: Below Zero	Action-adventure	Unknown Worlds Entertainment	Bandai Namco Entertainment	May 14, 2021	May 14, 2021	May 14, 2021	SD PA OP	
Suicide Squad: Kill the Justice League	Action-adventure	Rocksteady Studios	WB Games	Feb 2, 2024	Feb 2, 2024	Feb 2, 2024		
Sunshower	Action-adventure	NOKOGODO	NOKOGODO	Apr 16, 2025	Apr 16, 2025	Apr 16, 2025	SD OP	
Super Animal Royale	Battle royale	Pixile	Modus Games	Aug 26, 2021	Aug 26, 2021	Aug 26, 2021		
Super Bomberman Collection	Action	Red Art Games	Konami	Feb 5, 2026	Feb 5, 2026	Feb 5, 2026		
Super Bomberman R 2	Action	HexaDrive	Konami	Sep 12, 2023	Sep 12, 2023	Sep 12, 2023		
Super Crazy Rhythm Castle	Rhythm	Second Impact Games	Konami Digital Entertainment	Nov 14, 2023	Nov 14, 2023	Nov 14, 2023		
Supermarket Owner Simulator: Business	Simulation	GameToTopDesign	GameToTopDesign	Jun 12, 2025	Jun 12, 2025	Jun 12, 2025		
Super Monkey Ball: Banana Mania	Platform	Ryu Ga Gotoku Studio	Sega	Oct 7, 2021	Oct 5, 2021	Oct 5, 2021		
Super Slime Boy	Action-adventure	Kanuni Games	Kanuni Games	Jun 11, 2025	Jun 11, 2025	Jun 11, 2025		
Super Woden GP	Racing	ViJuDa	Eastasiasoft	Nov 9, 2022	Nov 9, 2022	Nov 9, 2022		
Superliminal	Puzzle	Pillow Castle	Pillow Castle, PlayEveryWare	Nov 21, 2022	Nov 21, 2022	Nov 21, 2022		
Sword Art Online: Last Recollection	Action role-playing	Aquria	Bandai Namco Entertainment	Oct 6, 2023	Oct 6, 2023	Oct 6, 2023		
Sword of the Necromancer	Roguelike; role-playing	Grimorio of Games	JanduSoft	TBA	TBA	TBA		
Synduality: Echo of Ada	Third-person shooter	Game Studio	Bandai Namco Entertainment	Jan 23, 2025	Jan 23, 2025	Jan 23, 2025		
Tainted Grail: Conquest	Roguelike deck-building	Questline	Awaken Realms	Sep 23, 2021	Sep 23, 2021	Sep 23, 2021		
Tainted Grail: The Fall of Avalon	Action role-playing; Open world	Questline	Awaken Realms	May 23, 2025	May 23, 2025	May 23, 2025		
Tales of Arise	Action role-playing	Bandai Namco Studios	Bandai Namco Entertainment	Sep 10, 2021	Sep 10, 2021	Sep 10, 2021		
Tales of Berseria Remastered	Action role-playing	Bandai Namco Studios	Bandai Namco Entertainment	Feb 26, 2026	Feb 27, 2026	Feb 27, 2026		
Tales of the Neon Sea	Adventure; Puzzle	Palm Pioneer; YiTi Games	Zodiac Interactive|Boke Technology|Thermite Games	Mar 30, 2023	Mar 30, 2023	Mar 30, 2023		
Tales of the Shire	Life simulation	Wētā Workshop	Private Division	Jul 29, 2025	Jul 29, 2025	Jul 29, 2025		
Talisman: Digital Edition	Role-playing	Nomad Games	Nomad Games	Jun 3, 2021	Jun 3, 2021	Jun 3, 2021		
The Talos Principle 2	Puzzle; Adventure	Croteam	Devolver Digital	Nov 2, 2023	Nov 2, 2023	Nov 2, 2023		
Teenage Mutant Ninja Turtles: Mutants Unleashed	Beat 'em up; Platformer	Aheartfulofgames	Outright Games	Oct 18, 2024	Oct 18, 2024	Oct 18, 2024	SD PA OP	
Teenage Mutant Ninja Turtles: Splintered Fate	Roguelike; Brawler	Super Evil Megacorp	Super Evil Megacorp	Jun 24, 2025	Jun 24, 2025	Jun 24, 2025		
Tennis World Tour 2	Sports	Big Ant Studios	Nacon	Jun 12, 2024	Mar 30, 2021	Jun 12, 2024		
Terminator 2D: No Fate	Action	Bitmap Bureau	Reef Entertainment	Dec 12, 2025	Dec 12, 2025	Dec 12, 2025	SD OP	
Test Drive Unlimited Solar Crown	Racing	Kylotonn	Nacon	Sep 12, 2024	Sep 12, 2024	Sep 12, 2024		
Tetris Effect: Connected	Puzzle	Monstars; Resonair	Enhance Games	Nov 10, 2020	Nov 10, 2020	Nov 10, 2020	SD OP	
Tetris Forever	Puzzle	Digital Eclipse	Digital Eclipse	Nov 12, 2024	Nov 12, 2024	Nov 12, 2024		
Tekken 8	Fighting	Bandai Namco Studios; Arika	Bandai Namco Entertainment	Jan 26, 2024	Jan 26, 2024	Jan 26, 2024		
Temtem	MMORPG	Crema	Humble Games	Sep 6, 2022	Sep 6, 2022	Sep 6, 2022		
Thank Goodness You're Here!	Adventure	Coal Supper	Panic	Dec 9, 2025	Dec 9, 2025	Dec 9, 2025		
There Are No Ghosts at the Grand	Simulation; Adventure	Friday Sundae	Friday Sundae	2026	2026	2026		
Theme Park Jam	Puzzle	Entity3 Limited	Entity3 Limited	Sep 10, 2025	Sep 10, 2025	Sep 10, 2025	SD PA OP	
Thomas & Friends: Wonders of Sodor	Adventure; Simulation	Dovetail Games	Dovetail Games	Mar 17, 2026	Mar 17, 2026	Mar 17, 2026		
Thymesia	Action role-playing	OverBorder Studio	Team17	Aug 18, 2022	Aug 18, 2022	Aug 18, 2022		
Tides of Tomorrow	Adventure	DigixArt	Deep Silver	Feb 24, 2026	Feb 24, 2026	Feb 24, 2026		
Tiebreak: Official Game of the ATP and WTA	Sports	Big Ant Studios	Nacon	Aug 22, 2024	Aug 22, 2024	Aug 22, 2024	SD OP	
Tiny Tina's Wonderlands	Action role-playing; First-person shooter	Gearbox Software	2K Games	Mar 25, 2022	Mar 25, 2022	Mar 25, 2022		
Tom Clancy's Rainbow Six Extraction	Tactical shooter	Ubisoft Montreal	Ubisoft	Jan 20, 2022	Jan 20, 2022	Jan 20, 2022		
Tom Clancy's Rainbow Six Siege	Tactical shooter	Ubisoft Montreal	Ubisoft	Dec 1, 2020	Dec 1, 2020	Dec 1, 2020		
Tomb Raider I–III Remastered	Action-adventure	Aspyr	Aspyr	Feb 14, 2024	Feb 14, 2024	Feb 14, 2024		
Tomb Raider IV–VI Remastered	Action-adventure	Aspyr	Aspyr	Feb 14, 2025	Feb 14, 2025	Feb 14, 2025		
Tomb Raider: Catalyst	Action-adventure	Crystal Dynamics	Amazon Game Studios	2027	2027	2027		
Tomb Raider: Legacy of Atlantis	Action-adventure	Crystal Dynamics; Flying Wild Hog	Amazon Game Studios	Feb 12, 2027	Feb 12, 2027	Feb 12, 2027		
Tony Hawk's Pro Skater 1 + 2	Sports	Vicarious Visions	Activision	Mar 26, 2021	Mar 26, 2021	Mar 26, 2021		
Tony Hawk's Pro Skater 3 + 4	Sports	Iron Galaxy	Activision	Jul 11, 2025	Jul 11, 2025	Jul 11, 2025	SD PA OP	
TopSpin 2K25	Sports	Hangar 13	2K	Apr 26, 2024	Apr 26, 2024	Apr 26, 2024		
Toree 3D	Platform	Siactro	Diplodocus Games	Jul 14, 2022	Apr 9, 2021	Apr 9, 2021		
Tormented Souls	Survival horror	Dual Effect; Abstract Digital	PQube	Sep 7, 2021	Sep 7, 2021	Sep 7, 2021		
Towerborne	Action role-playing	Stoic	Xbox Game Studios	Feb 26, 2026	Feb 26, 2026	Feb 26, 2026		
The Touryst	Action-adventure	Shin'en Multimedia	Shin'en Multimedia	Nov 10, 2020	Nov 10, 2020	Nov 10, 2020	SD OP	
Trainlax	Puzzle	Wildery	Upscale Studio	Feb 2, 2026	Feb 2, 2026	Feb 2, 2026		
Train Sim World 3	Simulation	Dovetail Games	Dovetail Games	Sep 6, 2022	Sep 6, 2022	Sep 6, 2022	SD OP	
Train Sim World 5	Simulation	Dovetail Games	Dovetail Games	Sep 17, 2024	Sep 17, 2024	Sep 17, 2024		
Trainz Simulator: World Tour	Simulation	N3V Games	N3V Games	Oct 23, 2025	Oct 23, 2025	Oct 23, 2025		
Trepang2	First-person shooter	Trepang Studios	Team17	Oct 2, 2023	Oct 2, 2023	Oct 2, 2023		
Trials of Mana	Action role-playing	Square Enix	Square Enix	Sep 26, 2024	Sep 26, 2024	Sep 26, 2024	PA	
Trifox	Action-adventure	Glowfish Interactive	Big Sugar	2022	2022	2022		
Tropico 6	Simulation	Limbic Entertainment	Kalypso Media	Mar 31, 2022	Mar 31, 2022	Mar 31, 2022		
Tropico 7	Simulation	Gaming Minds Studios	Kalypso Media	Jan 28, 2027	Jan 28, 2027	Jan 28, 2027		
Truck Driver: The American Dream	Simulation	Kyodai Limited	Soedesco	Sep 25, 2023	Sep 25, 2023	Sep 25, 2023		
Trek to Yomi	Action-adventure	Flying Wild Hog	Devolver Digital	2022	2022	2022		
Truck-kun is Supporting Me from Another World?!	Racing	Strange Scaffold	Frosty Pop Games	Jul 2026	Jul 2026	Jul 2026		
Tunic	Action-adventure	Isometricorp Games	Finiji	Mar 16, 2022	Mar 16, 2022	Mar 16, 2022	PA	
Turok 3: Shadow of Oblivion Remastered	First-person shooter	Nightdive Studios	Nightdive Studios	Nov 30, 2023	Nov 30, 2023	Nov 30, 2023	SD OP	
Twelve Minutes	Adventure	Luis Antonio	Annapurna Interactive	Aug 19, 2021	Aug 19, 2021	Aug 19, 2021		
Two Point Campus	Business simulation	Two Point Studios	Sega	Aug 9, 2022	Aug 9, 2022	Aug 9, 2022		
Two Point Museum	Business simulation	Two Point Studios	Sega	Mar 4, 2025	Mar 4, 2025	Mar 4, 2025		
UFL	Sports	Strikerz Inc.	Strikerz Inc.	Unreleased	Dec 5, 2024	Dec 5, 2024		
Ufouria: The Saga 2	Platformer; Metroidvania	Sunsoft	Red Art Games; Sunsoft	Mar 1, 2024	Mar 1, 2024	Mar 1, 2024		
Ultimate Fishing Simulator 2	Sports	Ultimate Games	Ultimate Games	TBA	TBA	TBA		
Ultros	Metroidvania	Hadoque	Kepler Interactive	Feb 13, 2025	Feb 13, 2025	Feb 13, 2025		
Undisputed	Sports	Steel City Interactive	Deep Silver	Oct 11, 2024	Oct 11, 2024	Oct 11, 2024		
Unexplored 2: The Wayfarer's Legacy	Roguelike	Ludomotion	Ludomotion	Unreleased	Jun 3, 2022	Jun 3, 2022		
Unicorn Overlord	Tactical role-playing	Vanillaware	Atlus	Mar 8, 2024	2024|Mar|08	Mar 8, 2024		
Unknown 9: Awakening	Action-adventure	Reflector Entertainment	Bandai Namco Entertainment	Oct 18, 2024	Oct 18, 2024	Oct 18, 2024		
Vampire: The Masquerade – Bloodlines 2	Action-adventure	Hardsuit Labs	Paradox Interactive	TBA	TBA	TBA	SD OP	
Vampire: The Masquerade – Swansong	Action role-playing	Big Bad Wolf	Nacon	May 19, 2022	May 19, 2022	May 19, 2022		
Visage	Survival Horror	SadSquare Studio	SadSquare Studio	Oct 30, 2020	Oct 30, 2020	Oct 30, 2020	OP	
Visions of Mana	Action role-playing	Ouka Studios	Square Enix	Jul 29, 2024	Sep 30, 2024	Sep 30, 2024		
The Walking Dead: Destinies	Action-adventure	Flux Games	GameMill Entertainment	Nov 17, 2023	Nov 17, 2023	Nov 17, 2023		
The Wandering Village	City-building	Stray Fawn	Stray Fawn	Jul 17, 2025	Jul 17, 2025	Jul 17, 2025		
Wanderstop	Cozy	Ivy Road	Annapurna Interactive	Mar 11, 2025	Mar 11, 2025	Mar 11, 2025		
Wanted: Dead	Action; Hack and slash; third-person shooter	Soleil	110 Industries	Feb 14, 2023	Feb 14, 2023	Feb 14, 2023	OP	
Wardogs	First-person shooter	Bulkhead	Team17	2028	2028	2028		
Warframe	Third-person shooter	Digital Extremes	Digital Extremes	Apr 14, 2021	Apr 14, 2021	Apr 14, 2021		
Wargroove 2	Turn-based tactics	Chucklefish; Robotality	Chucklefish	Sep 19, 2024	Sep 19, 2024	Sep 19, 2024		
Warhammer: Chaosbane	Action role-playing; Hack and slash	Eko Software	Bigben Interactive	Nov 10, 2020	Nov 10, 2020	Nov 10, 2020		
Warhammer 40,000: Battlesector	Turn-based tactics	Black Lab Games	Slitherine Software	Dec 2, 2021	Dec 2, 2021	Dec 2, 2021		
Warhammer 40,000: Boltgun	First-person shooter	Auroch Digital	Focus Entertainment	May 23, 2023	May 23, 2023	May 23, 2023	SD OP	
Warhammer 40,000: Boltgun 2	First-person shooter	Auroch Digital	Big Fan Games	2026	2026	2026		
Warhammer 40,000: Chaos Gate - Daemonhunters	Turn-based strategy; Tactical role-playing	Complex Games	Frontier Foundry	Feb 20, 2024	Feb 20, 2024	Feb 20, 2024		
Warhammer 40,000: Dark Heresy	Role-playing	Owlcat Games	Owlcat Games	TBA	TBA	TBA		
Warhammer 40,000: Darktide	Action	Fatshark	Fatshark	Oct 4, 2023	Oct 4, 2023	Oct 4, 2023		
Warhammer 40,000: Shootas, Blood and Teef	Run and gun	Rogueside	Rogueside	Oct 26, 2022	Oct 26, 2022	Oct 26, 2022	SD OP	
Warhammer 40,000: Space Marine 2	Third-person shooter (with Hack and slash elements)	Saber St. Petersburg	Focus Entertainment	Sep 9, 2024	Sep 9, 2024	Sep 9, 2024		
War Hospital	Strategy	Brave Lamb Studio	Nacon	Jan 11, 2024	Jan 11, 2024	Jan 11, 2024		
Warlock: Dungeons & Dragons	Action-adventure	Invoke Studios	Wizards of the Coast	2027	2027	2027		
War Mongrels	Real-time tactics	Destructive Creations	All In! Games	2021	2021	2021		
War Thunder	Action; vehicular combat; combat flight simulator	Gaijin Entertainment	Gaijin Entertainment	Nov 10, 2020	Nov 10, 2020	Nov 10, 2020		
Watch Dogs: Legion	Action-adventure	Ubisoft Toronto	Ubisoft	Nov 10, 2020	Nov 10, 2020	Nov 10, 2020	SD OP	
Wavetale	Platform	Zoink Games	Thunderful Publishing; Thunderful Group	Dec 13, 2022	Dec 13, 2022	Dec 13, 2022		
Wayfinder	Action role-playing	Airship Syndicate	Airship Syndicate	Oct 21, 2024	Oct 21, 2024	Oct 21, 2024		
Wayward Strand	Adventure	Ghost Pattern	Ghost Pattern	Sep 15, 2022	Sep 15, 2022	Sep 15, 2022		
We Love Katamari Reroll+ Royal Reverie	Puzzle; Action	Bandai Namco Entertainment	Bandai Namco Entertainment	Jun 2, 2023	Jun 2, 2023	Jun 2, 2023		
Weird West: Definitive Edition	Action role-playing	WolfEye Studios	Devolver Digital	May 8, 2023	May 8, 2023	May 8, 2023		
Welcome to Brightville	Action	Contrast Games	Contrast Games	2027	2027	2027		
Werewolf: The Apocalypse – Earthblood	Action role-playing	Cyanide	Nacon	TBA	Feb 4, 2021	Feb 4, 2021		
White Day: A Labyrinth Named School	Survival horror	Sonnori	PQube	Sep 8, 2022	Sep 8, 2022	Sep 8, 2022	SD OP	
The Wild at Heart	Action-Adventure, Puzzle	Moonlight Kids	Humble Games	May 20, 2021	May 20, 2021	May 20, 2021	SD	
Wild Hearts	Action	Omega Force	Electronic Arts	Feb 17, 2023	Feb 17, 2023	Feb 17, 2023		
Wildermyth	Tactical role-playing	Worldwalker Games	Auroch Digital	Unreleased	Oct 22, 2024	Oct 22, 2024		
Wildfrost	Roguelike deck-building	Deadpan Games; Gaziter	Chucklefish	Dec 10, 2024	Dec 10, 2024	Dec 10, 2024	SD PA OP	
The Witcher IV	Action role-playing	CD Projekt Red	CD Projekt	TBA	TBA	TBA		
The Witcher 3: Wild Hunt	Action role-playing	CD Projekt Red	CD Projekt	Dec 14, 2022	Dec 14, 2022	Dec 14, 2022	SD OP	
Wo Long: Fallen Dynasty	Action role-playing	Team Ninja	Koei Tecmo	Mar 3, 2023	Mar 3, 2023	Mar 3, 2023		
The Wolf Among Us 2	Adventure	Telltale Games; AdHoc Studio	Telltale Games	TBA	TBA	TBA		
World of Warships: Legends	Massively multiplayer online; Vehicular combat; Third-person shooter	Wargaming	Wargaming	Apr 26, 2021	Apr 26, 2021	Apr 26, 2021		
Worms Rumble	Action; battle royale	Team17	Team17	June 23, 2021	June 23, 2021	June 23, 2021		
WRC 9	Racing	Kylotonn	Nacon	Nov 10, 2020	Nov 10, 2020	Nov 10, 2020	SD OP	
WRC 10	Racing	Kylotonn	Nacon	Sep 2, 2021	Sep 2, 2021	Sep 2, 2021		
WRC Generations	Racing	Kylotonn	Nacon	Nov 3, 2022	Nov 3, 2022	Nov 3, 2022		
The Wreck	Narrative adventure	The Pixel Hunt	The Pixel Hunt	Mar 14, 2023	Mar 14, 2023	Mar 14, 2023	SD OP	
Wreckfest	Vehicular combat; racing	Bugbear Entertainment	THQ Nordic	May 4, 2021	May 4, 2021	May 4, 2021		
Wreckfest 2	Vehicular Combat; Racing	Bugbear Entertainment	THQ Nordic	TBA	TBA	TBA		
WrestleQuest	Role-playing	Mega Cat Studios	Skybound Games	Aug 22, 2023	Aug 22, 2023	Aug 22, 2023	SD OP	
Wuchang: Fallen Feathers	Soulslike; Action role-playing	Leenzee	505 Games	Jul 24, 2025	Jul 24, 2025	Jul 24, 2025		
WWE 2K22	Sports	Visual Concepts	2K	Mar 11, 2022	Mar 11, 2022	Mar 11, 2022		
WWE 2K23	Sports	Visual Concepts	2K	Mar 17, 2023	Mar 17, 2023	Mar 17, 2023		
WWE 2K24	Sports	Visual Concepts	2K	Mar 8, 2024	Mar 8, 2024	Mar 8, 2024		
WWE 2K25	Sports	Visual Concepts	2K	Mar 14, 2025	Mar 14, 2025	Mar 14, 2025		
WWE 2K26	Sports	Visual Concepts	2K	Mar 13, 2026	Mar 13, 2026	Mar 13, 2026		
XDefiant	First-person shooter	Ubisoft San Francisco	Ubisoft	May 21, 2024	May 21, 2024	May 21, 2024		
XEL	Action-adventure	Tiny Roar	Assemble Entertainment	Apr 21, 2023	Apr 21, 2023	Apr 21, 2023		
XIII	First-person shooter; Stealth	PlayMagic	Microids	Sep 13, 2022	Sep 13, 2022	Sep 13, 2022		
Yakuza 0 Director's Cut	Action-adventure	Ryu Ga Gotoku Studio	Sega	Dec 8, 2025	Dec 8, 2025	Dec 8, 2025		
Yakuza: Like a Dragon	Role-playing	Ryu Ga Gotoku Studio	Sega	Feb 25, 2021	Nov 10, 2020	Nov 10, 2020	SD OP	
Yakuza Kiwami	Action-adventure	Ryu Ga Gotoku Studio	Sega	Dec 8, 2025	Dec 8, 2025	Dec 8, 2025		
Yakuza Kiwami 2	Action-adventure	Ryu Ga Gotoku Studio	Sega	Dec 8, 2025	Dec 8, 2025	Dec 8, 2025		
Yakuza Kiwami 3 & Dark Ties	Action-adventure; Beat 'em up	Ryu Ga Gotoku Studio	Sega	Feb 12, 2026	Feb 12, 2026	Feb 12, 2026		
Yes, Your Grace	Role-playing; strategy	Brave at Night	No More Robots	Nov 10, 2020	Nov 10, 2020	Nov 10, 2020	SD	
You Suck at Parking	Arcade Racing	Happy Volcano	Curve Games	Sep 14, 2022	Sep 14, 2022	Sep 14, 2022	SD	
Yu-Gi-Oh! Master Duel	Card battle	Konami	Konami	Jan 18, 2022	Jan 18, 2022	Jan 18, 2022	XP SD OP	
Yuoni	Survival horror	Tricore	Chorus Worldwide	Aug 19, 2021	Aug 19, 2021	Aug 19, 2021		
Zenless Zone Zero	Action role-playing; Hack and slash	miHoYo	WW: HoYoverse; TWN/HKG/MAC: Nijigen Games; VNM: Gamota	Jun 6, 2025	Jun 6, 2025	Jun 6, 2025		

== Cancelled games ==
Title	Genre(s)	Developer(s)	Publisher(s)	Ref.
Contraband	Action-adventure	Avalanche Studios Group	Xbox Game Studios	
Deus Ex Remastered	Action role-playing; Stealth	Aspyr; Eidos-Montréal	Aspyr	
Everwild	Adventure	Rare	Xbox Game Studios	

== See also ==
- List of backward-compatible games for Xbox One and Series X/S
- List of PlayStation 5 games
- List of Nintendo Switch games
- List of Nintendo Switch 2 games
