= List of Suikoden characters =

List of Suikoden characters refers to these lists of Suikoden characters:

- List of Suikoden II characters
- List of Suikoden III characters
- List of Suikoden IV characters
- List of Suikoden V characters
- List of Suikoden Tierkreis characters
