= Suikoden Tierkreis =

2008 video game

- Developer: Konami
- Publisher: Konami
- Director: Osamu Komuta
- Artist: Masaki Hirooka
- Writer: Kazuyoshi Tsugawa
- Composers: Yoshino Aoki; Norikazu Miura; Masaharu Iwata; Kaori Komuro; Hiroaki Tomuno
- Series: Suikoden
- Platform: Nintendo DS
- Release: JP: December 18, 2008; EU: March 13, 2009; NA: March 17, 2009
- Genre: Role-playing video game
- Mode: Single-player

Suikoden Tierkreis (Gensō Suikoden Tierkreis (幻想水滸伝ティアクライス; with "Tierkreis" being German for "Zodiac") is a role-playing video game for the Nintendo DS developed and published by Konami as part of the Suikoden series. It was released in December 2008 in Japan, and released in English in Europe and North America in March 2009. The game's development was led by project head Osamu Komuta, who had previously been a planner for Suikoden Tactics, with a music staff composed of Norikaku Miura, Yoshino Aoki, Masaharu Iwata, and Kaori Komuro. The game features the opening and ending theme songs "Tears in the Sky" and "Tierkreis" respectively, each performed by Japanese pop idol Satomi Takasugi.

Created as a spin-off of the main series of games, Suikoden Tierkreis was made to explore one of the myriad of worlds that exist in the Suikoden metaverse. Following the game's main theme of "the infinite possibility of future", players must assume the role of a young protagonist who gathers the combined forces of 108 heroes to attempt to defeat a powerful entity known as The One King, leader of The Order of the One True Way, who seeks to control the world by spreading his doctrine that all fate is predetermined and all people have no control of their lives.

== Gameplay ==
A battle scene. Character information is on the top screen, while gameplay is shown on the bottom.

Suikoden Tierkreis is a traditional JRPG where the player must navigate through three-dimensional environments and complete story-based objectives to advance the narrative. Taking advantage of the Nintendo DS' dual screens, gameplay, text, and menu options are often displayed on the bottom screen. On the field, the top screen shows a landscape image of the player's current location, along with the name of that location and season information. During battle the top screen also displays character information such as hit points, magic points, etc. Players move their character through the game using either the directional pad or the stylus wand to take advantage of the DS' touchscreen function. While advancing through the game, the player must interact with non-player characters to move the story forward and allow new scenarios to become available for play, as well as to discover new items and areas.

During gameplay, players will randomly encounter enemy creatures every few steps while in hostile areas. Battles in Suikoden Tierkreis use a turn-based approach where players input commands for all active characters in their party before each combat round, with the corresponding actions taking place in accordance with each character's "speed" rating. A player's party may consist of up to four characters at a time, with special combination skills becoming available depending on which specific characters are included. When a player defeats a group of enemies, they are awarded experience points that go toward increasing their party member's levels, thereby making them stronger and able to use more special skills in battle. Defeated enemies may also provide trade items that can be sold for money to purchase goods in-game such as restorative items and better equipment that will allow the player to battle even stronger enemies. By using the DS' Wi-Fi function, two players each with their own game card can connect to each other to exchange characters and items, as well as gain access to unique battle scenarios.

== Plot ==
The game is set in a world with several diverse nations and tribes and inhabited by a range of creatures including humans, Roar (similar to the Kobolds and Nay-Kobolds of previous games), Porpos-kin (small, penguin/dolphin like creatures), and Auster (a race of horned giants).

The game opens as the leader of 108 heroes engages the main antagonist known as "The One King" in battle. It is currently unknown whether the defeat shown in the introduction precedes the game or if the game is actually a flashback leading to that scene. The game is set in a parallel world to the main world of the series, which is one of the many worlds in the Suikoden multiverse, known collectively as the Infinity.

The protagonist is an energetic young man from Citro Village who eventually ends up fighting a mysterious organization that preaches a fatalist philosophy in which the future is predetermined.

The concept of the Infinity has been previously explored in other Suikoden games: monsters from another dimension are summoned by Windy and Leknaat in Suikoden I, and by Luc and Sarah in Suikoden III; Nash Latkje, Humphrey Mintz, and Futch visit The World of Wings and Scales in Suikogaiden II, a parallel world where only dragons exist, while dragons are only able to exist in the main Suikoden world via the Dragon Rune, one of the 27 True Runes; the Fog Ship Guide, who appears in Suikoden IV, hails from another world; and the final battle of Suikoden Tactics takes place in the World of Emptiness, a parallel world from which monsters are summoned. Additionally, it is implied that recurring characters Viki, Yuber, and Pesmerga likely come from parallel worlds.

== Characters ==
The player takes on the role of an unnamed character from Citro Village. Events in the game lead to the hero working to assemble the 108 heroes to oppose the powerful, cult-like society called The Order of the One True Way, which tries to force its principles on other nations under the mantra of "One World! One Future!" The leader of the Order intends to summon the being known as The One King with the power of the Chronicles, memories of different worlds, in hopes of becoming part of The One King's world, where everything is predetermined.

No characters from previous installments of the Suikoden series return for Tierkreis.

== Development ==
Suikoden Tierkreis was directed by Osamu Komuta, who had previously served as a programmer in Suikoden IV and a planner in Suikoden Tactics. Kazuyoshi Tsugawa, who had penned Suikoden V, also served as head writer. Takahiro Sakiyama, the director of Suikoden V, took part in this game's development as the lead planner.

== Reception ==
Reception

Aggregate score
Aggregator	Score
Metacritic	76 / 100

Review scores
Publication	Score
Destructoid	8.5 / 10
Eurogamer	7 / 10
Famitsu	34 / 40
GamePro	4/5 stars
GameSpot	7.5 / 10
GameZone	7.9 / 10
IGN	8.8 / 10
NGamer	85%
Nintendo Power	7 / 10
Official Nintendo Magazine	81%

Suikoden Tierkreis sold an estimated 40,000 copies in its first day in Japan, with a lifetime total of approximately 174,000 in the region. Famitsu Weekly gave it a score of one nine, one eight, one nine, and one eight for a total of 34 out of 40; they found the game's story "fascinating" and the game itself to have no real shortcomings, stating, "from the way the story unfolds to the battle system, there are no obvious flaws to be found."

The English version received "generally favorable reviews" according to the review aggregation website Metacritic. IGN granted the game with an Editor's Choice award. Although the website found the game's overall presentation and production to be good, they felt longtime fans of the series may find it too different, commenting that "Suikoden Tierkreis may not be a pocket-sized representation of what hardcore series fans have grown to love, but it's still one of the deepest and fully produced RPGs on the system, and a serious showpiece." Editors at Nintendo Power conversely found fault with the game's core gameplay and simple battle system, but still found it to have a good storytelling technique, remarking that "As much as [I] grumble about its flaws, Tierkreis's epic scope and engaging narrative did keep [me] playing, eager to see what would happen next." GameSpot called the game "a brisk, beautiful role-playing experience", commenting on the game's "fantastic" visuals and music but panning the main character's "atrocious" English voice acting and lack of initial Wi-Fi support until the player is well into the game.
