= Miki Higashino =

Japanese video game composer (born 1968)

- Also known as: MIKI-CHANG
- Born: January 1, 1965 (age 61); Toyonaka, Osaka Prefecture, Japan
- Genres: Jazz; Video game music
- Occupation: Composer
- Instrument: Piano
- Years active: 1985–present

Miki Higashino (東野 美紀, Higashino Miki; born January 1, 1965) is a Japanese video game composer best known for her works in the Suikoden series.

== Biography ==
Higashino first began composing video game music as a student employed by Konami and contributed to various minor products, often uncredited or under the alias MIKI-CHAN or MIKI-CHANG. Her substantial early works include the Gradius soundtrack in collaboration with the Konami Kukeiha Club in 1985. Higashino has since been involved in over a dozen projects and compilations.

Aside from being the primary composer for the original Suikoden soundtrack, she also worked on the Suikoden II soundtrack, a 105 track effort which she composed in its entirety save 7 songs by Keiko Fukami and 1 song by Tappy Iwase. In 2001 Higashino left Konami on maternity leave but later collaborated with videogame composer Yasunori Mitsuda in 2005 on the Tsukiyo ni Saraba (Moonlit Shadow) soundtrack. Arranged versions of her original music appear on the Suikoden IV, Suikoden V, and Suikoden Tactics soundtracks.

== Musical style and influences ==
Higashino cites Maurice Ravel, Gabriel Fauré, Lúnasa, and Hevia as musical influences.

== Discography ==
Composer

- Gradius (1985)
- Yie Ar Kung-Fu (1985)
- Salamander (1986)
- Life Force (1986)
- Knightmare (1986)
- Salamander (MSX) (1987) – with Motoaki Furukawa and Masahiro Ikariko
- Gradius III (1989) – with Seiichi Fukami, Keizo Nakamura, Mutsuhiko Izumi, and Junichiro Kaneda
- Teenage Mutant Ninja Turtles (1989) – with Mutsuhiko Izumi
- Surprise Attack (1990) – with Hidenori Maezawa and Keizo Nakamura
- Contra III: The Alien Wars (1992) – with Masanori Adachi and Tappi Iwase
- Premier Soccer (1993)
- Mōryō Senki MADARA 2 (1993) – with Masanori Adachi and Tappi Iwase
- Teenage Mutant Ninja Turtles: Tournament Fighters (Mega Drive/Genesis version) (1993)
- Double Dribble: The Playoff Edition (1994)
- Tokimeki Memorial (1994) – with Mikio Saito, Seiya Murai, and Hiroe Noguchi
- Suikoden (1995) – with Tappi Iwase, Hiroshi Tamawari, Setsu Taniguchi, Mayuko Kagesita
- Gradius Deluxe Pack (1996) (Staff roll music) – with Akira Yamaoka, Kiyohiko Yamane, and Motoaki Furukawa
- Vandal Hearts: Ancient Lost Civilization (1996) – with Hiroshi Tamawari, Kosuke Soeda, Masahiro Yamauchi
- Suikoden II (1998) – with Keiko Fukami
- Gensō Suikogaiden Vol. 1 (2000) – with Keiko Fukami
- Gensō Suikogaiden Vol. 2 (2001) – with Keiko Fukami
- 10,000 Bullets (2005) – with Yasunori Mitsuda
- Pop'n Music: Adventure (2007)
