= Gensō Suikoden Card Stories =

2001 video game

- Developer(s): Will
- Publisher(s): Konami
- Artist(s): Fumi Ishikawa; Junko Kawano
- Series: Suikoden
- Platform(s): Game Boy Advance
- Release: JP: September 13, 2001
- Genre(s): Strategy
- Mode(s): Single-player

Gensō Suikoden Card Stories (Japanese: 幻想水滸伝カードストーリーズ) is a spin-off title of the Suikoden franchise by Konami which includes both a Game Boy Advance game and a physical collectible card game. Both were released in the fall of 2001 in Japan.

Unlike other areas of the Suikoden franchise, in which the storyline is a major element of gameplay, Card Stories focuses mainly on the card battles themselves and less on the plot.

Most of the cards feature characters who appear in both Suikoden and Suikoden II of Konami's role-playing video game series. Several cards also feature characters who would later go on to appear in Suikoden III.

The GBA game retells the story of Suikoden II with a few changes. An English fan translation of the game by Pokeytax was released on September 7, 2013.
