= 10,000 Bullets =

2005 video game

- European cover art
- Developers: Blue Moon Studio; Metro Corporation
- Publisher: Taito
- Director: Yoshitaka Murayama
- Artist: Ryōji Minagawa
- Composers: Yasunori Mitsuda; Miki Higashino
- Platform: PlayStation 2
- Release: JP: February 24, 2005; EU: October 6, 2005
- Genre: Shooter
- Mode: Single-player

10,000 Bullets, known in Japan as Tsukiyo ni Saraba (ツキヨニサラバ; lit. "Farewell to the Moonlit Night"), is a third-person shooter video game developed by Blue Moon Studio with Metro Corporation and published by Taito for the PlayStation 2 console. It was released in Japan in 2005, and distributed in Europe by 505 GameStreet later that year. 10,000 Bullets follows an elite hitman named Crow, who works for an Italian mob family and has the innate power of the "gunslinger", allowing him to manipulate the flow of time in battle. The gameplay of 10,000 Bullets focuses on this ability, in which the player must slow down the action in order to avoid the waves of enemy assaults and other hazards.

10,000 Bullets was directed by Suikoden franchise creator Yoshitaka Murayama, who left Konami in 2002 and started his own development firm, Blue Moon Studio, shortly thereafter. Accompanied by Spriggan illustrator Ryōji Minagawa and composers Yasunori Mitsuda and Miki Higashino, Murayama began producing 10,000 Bullets about a half a year after founding the new company. Murayama had wanted to create an action-shooter even before the Suikoden series. 10,000 Bullets was met with poor sales in Japan and a mediocre response from import reviewers. Critics found the game to be unoriginal and noted camera problems, but enjoyed the action sequences.

== Plot ==
10,000 Bullets follows Crow, a hitman living in Ireland who works for the Rome-based crime syndicate known as the Tonio Family. Crow possesses the special "gunslinger" ability, which allows him to slow down time. He inherited this trait from his late mother, a powerful fortune teller who was murdered when Crow was very young. After being taken in by mob boss Papa Tonio, Crow is taught to optimize his abilities by a fellow hitman named Judas, a fugitive from France. Crow hopes to one day exact revenge on the person responsible for his mother's death. The protagonist is partnered with the young Alice, an Englishwoman of German descent fleeing custody after the death of her military officer grandfather.

== Gameplay ==
The player freezes time to easily kill a number of enemies.

10,000 Bullets is an action/third-person shooter in which the gun-wielding player character battles numerous enemies and bosses in different environments. Styled similar to cinematography found in The Wachowskis' The Matrix film franchise and gameplay mechanics in games such as Dead to Rights and Max Payne, the player is given an ability to slow down time and thus dodge multitudes of flying bullets and other obstacles. The first level, "Enhancement", slows down all action, including the player character. The second level, "Blitz", slows down only the enemies, allowing the player to move around at normal speed. The third level, "Frozen Time", halts everything around the player, who again maintains normal speed. By pressing the shoulder buttons, the player can lock-onto and switch aim at the various enemies. Successfully dispatching several foes in a row earns the player bonus points, which can be used at the end of a stage to purchase upgrades like more health, as well as special attacks and acrobatic evasion skills that can be mapped to certain controller buttons. The game features four playable characters (Crow, Alice, Dragon, and Boris), each of which has their own unique set of abilities. Between the action sequences, the player must advance the plot through a graphic adventure-style interface, where certain characters must be spoken to in order to continue.

== Development ==
10,000 Bullets was produced by Suikoden series creator Yoshitaka Murayama under his own Blue Moon Studio, with game development handled by Metro Corporation and published by Taito. It is the first game that Murayama has created since Suikoden III and his departure from Konami in 2002. The project began about half a year after starting up his own development company. Before signing on to create the role-playing franchise, Murayama had been wanting to make a shoot 'em up, citing his preference for arcade action titles such as Taito's Metal Black. When the game was first revealed, the new detail revealed that the player could die from a single gunshot wound. Murayama explained in an interview to Dengeki Playstation: "I've been thinking for a while if there were any ways of bringing movie-style gunplay action scenes into video games, but the difficult thing was that it wouldn't be much of a game if you died instantly with one quick shot. And the solution to that was slow motion and motion stopping. I realized that the game's visuals didn't have to be quick to convey the thrills of gun battles and getting killed with a single shot... When you think about having to dodge enemy shots and shooting back at them, Tsukiyo ni Saraba is kind of close to a shooting game". Development on 10,000 Bullets took nearly three years to complete. The game's characters were designed by Ryōji Minagawa, the artist for the manga series Spriggan.

=== Music ===
The music for the game was co-composed by Konami veteran Miki Higashino and Yasunori Mitsuda, famous for his work on Square properties such as Chrono Trigger and Xenogears. After her contribution to the 2001 release Gensō Suikogaiden Vol. 2, Higashino retired from video game scoring to focus on her family. She returned to work on 10,000 Bullets after an invitation from her former boss Murayama. Higashino chose jazz for her contributions to the score and wanted to integrate bebop or acid jazz, but found she lacked the time to do so while caring for a new baby. Higashino felt that she "probably caused a good deal of trouble for my family, my client, and Mitsuda-san" and took yet another hiatus from composing. The game's soundtrack, Moonlit Shadow, was published in Japan by Mitsuda's Procyon studio the day before the game's Japanese launch.

Moonlit Shadow track list
No.	Title	Lyrics	Music	Length
1.	"Tsukiyo Ni Saraba ~ Opening Theme ~"		Yasunori Mitsuda	1:38
2.	"The Maximum High Speed"		Miki Higashino	2:47
3.	"Smooth Blues"		Higashino	4:34
4.	"D.O.L.L"		Mitsuda	3:19
5.	"Cool Sky"		Mitsuda	3:03
6.	"Joni Scott Club"		Higashino	2:21
7.	"An Illegal Messenger"		Higashino	3:24
8.	"Red Shot"		Higashino	2:20
9.	"Urban Fantasy"		Mitsuda	2:06
10.	"Hit Man"		Mitsuda	3:59
11.	"Striking Distance"		Mitsuda	1:39
12.	"Junk! Junk! Junk!"		Higashino	3:34
13.	"Target"		Mitsuda	3:05
14.	"One Note Blues"		Higashino	3:18
15.	"Jungle City"		Mitsuda	3:46
16.	"Asian Kung-Fu Foundation"		Higashino	4:15
17.	"Blue Moon"		Mitsuda	3:16
18.	"Au Revoir Dans la Nuit de Clair de Lune"		Higashino	2:49
19.	"Maria"	Yoshitaka Murayama	Mitsuda	1:16
20.	"Lullaby"	Higashino	Higashino, Akira Ishii	4:01
Total length:				60:30

== Release ==
10,000 Bullets was first announced via the Japanese magazine Dengeki PlayStation in September 2004. The game was subsequently showcased at the Tokyo Game Show (TGS) later that month. 10,000 Bullets was officially released in Japan on February 24, 2005. A launch event was held at three locations near Shinjuku Station; Atsuko Enomoto, the Japanese voice actress for the character Alice, held autograph sessions for those who purchased the game. Taito published the game in Europe later that year with distribution by 505 GameStreet. The game was translated by the Japanese firm Soli Consultants and features English voice acting and in-game text with multiple language options including English, Italian, German, French, and Spanish. The game was re-released in Japan on November 2, 2006, under the "Taito Best" label.

== Reception ==
10,000 Bullets received mediocre scores from Japanese publications including a 27 out of 40 from Weekly Famitsu and a 270 out of 400 from Dengeki PlayStation. Spencer of Siliconera found the Japanese version of 10,000 Bullets to be a cheap imitation of more successful action games that use bullet-time. He noticed a faulty camera and lock-on system issues, bland environments, a tedious adventure mode, and a musical score that does not match the game's overall theme. The reviewer did, however, enjoy the action sequences. Ed Lewis of IGN, who previewed the incomplete TGS version of the game, noted similar problems with the camera, but was likewise impressed with the action, stating that the game "packs in lots of action and uses the time manipulation in a way that almost feels like a 3D version of Viewtiful Joe". 10,000 Bullets was met coldy by the editors of Official UK PlayStation 2 Magazine, who summarized it as "dull action-adventure which combines sub-standard bullet-time combat, badly synched cut-scenes, and a waif-like plot" and stated that "not even hardcore masochists should touch it".

10,000 Bullets sold poorly in Japan. According to Media Create sales information, the game ranked 500th on the top 500 best-selling games in Japan for 2005 at just 15,244 copies. Taito had previously developed a third-person action game Bujingai. However, as of 2010, the company has expressed no interest in re-entering the genre.
