= Gensō Suikoden: Tsumugareshi Hyakunen no Toki =

2012 video game

- Developer: Konami
- Publisher: Konami
- Director: Osamu Komuta
- Producer: Shingo Mukaitoge
- Artist: Ohtsuki Beruno
- Writer: Kazuyoshi Tsugawa
- Composer: Seiichi Takamoto
- Series: Suikoden
- Platform: PlayStation Portable
- Release: JP: February 9, 2012
- Genre: Role-playing game
- Mode: Single-player

Gensō Suikoden: Tsumugareshi Hyakunen no Toki (Japanese: 幻想水滸伝 紡がれし百年の時) "Gensō Suikoden: The Woven Web of a Century" is a role-playing video game developed by Konami for the PlayStation Portable. It was released in Japan on February 9, 2012.

== Gameplay ==
Gensō Suikoden: Tsumugareshi Hyakunen no Toki is a traditional console role-playing video game featuring three-dimensional characters and environments. To progress through the game, players must travel through various environments, interact with non-player characters and battle enemies to advance the story. Players take control of a party of up to six characters out of a possible 108, which are recruited from one of three time periods of the game's world: the present, 100 years ago, and 200 years ago. Each character is classified as one of eight combat job classes: Medicine User, Bard, Ninja, Martial Artist, Archer, Spearman, Wizard, and Swordsman, or a craftsman class such as Blacksmith, Magic Stone Craftsman, or Cook, each with their own distinct abilities and statistics. Characters may take on new sub-jobs by altering their equipment. By using the "Skill Transmission System", characters from the past may teach others of the same job class new abilities which have been "lost in time".

Battles in Tsumugareshi Hyakunen no Toki take place when a character touches an on-screen enemy, and use a turn-based approach where each character takes turns attacking based on their speed statistic. Players may arrange their characters in formation on a three-by-three grid, the placement of which affects certain characters' combat performance. Certain characters may also use special team-up moves with others to attack enemies together.

== Plot ==
Like Suikoden Tierkreis, Tsumugareshi Hyakunen no Toki is a side-game which takes place in its own universe within the Suikoden "Million World" multiverse outside the continuity of other games in the series. The plot concerns the main protagonist, a swordsman from a small village, and his two friends, Myura and Zeno, who are thrown back in time 100 years by a mysterious boy named Xephon. While in the past, they must train with heroes of antiquity and eventually face the Centennial Monster, a powerful being which rises every century and attempts to destroy the world.

=== Characters ===
Protagonist
Voiced by: Hiroshi Kamiya

Murat (ミュラ, Myura)
Voiced by: Marina Inoue

Zeno (ジーノ, Jīno)
Voiced by: Jun Fukuyama

Ducasse (デューカス, Deyūkasu)
Voiced by: Katsuyuki Konishi

Xephon (ゼフォン, Zefon)
Voiced by: Yūki Kaji

== Development ==
Gensō Suikoden: Tsumugareshi Hyakunen no Toki was first announced by representatives of Konami at the 2011 Tokyo Game Show in Japan, though no specific details aside from its platform were given until the following month in an October 2011 issue of Weekly Famitsu magazine.

The development team was composed of project director Osamu Komuta, who previously worked on Suikoden Tierkreis, and scenario writer Kazuyoshi Tsugawa, who was involved with Tierkeis and Suikoden V. Like previous games in the series, the title's art direction was made to include elements of Eastern and Western culture.

== Release and promotion ==
Konami offered multiple special edition packages to customers in Japan through their Konami Style online store, including the option to bundle the game with a soundtrack CD, drama CD, artbook, and a Genso Suikoden encyclopedia guidebook.

The soundtrack album, Genso Suikoden Tsumugareshi Hyakunen no Toki Original Soundtrack & Drama CD, published by Konami Digital Entertainment, contains 38 tracks from the game across two discs, including the vocal theme song "The Giving Tree" performed by Chiaki Ishikawa. First print copies in the region were packaged with codes which could be redeemed for PlayStation Portable themes based on previous games in the series.

An English fan translation of the game by the Twisted Phoenix Game Translation was released on October 7, 2021.

== Reception ==
Reception

Review score
Publication	Score
Famitsu	30 / 40

Gensō Suikoden: Tsumugareshi Hyakunen no Toki was the highest-selling title during its debut week in Japan, selling 61, 784 units. It would go on to sell a total of 83,086 copies in the region before falling from the top 20 sales charts in March 2012. The game received a 30 out of 40 rating from Weekly Famitsu magazine based on individual reviews of 8, 7, 8, and 7, as well as a 78.75 out of 100 average based on scores of 80, 80, 80 and 75 from Dengeki PlayStation magazine.
