= Junko Kawano =

Japanese game designer, game director and writer

- Born: Japan
- Occupations: Game designer and producer

Junko Kawano (河野 純子, Kawano Junko) is a Japanese game designer, game director and writer. She helped Yoshitaka Murayama create the Suikoden series of role-playing video games. Initially a character designer and illustrator, she helped the series for Konami following Murayama's departure in 2002, writing and producing Suikoden IV and its spinoff title Suikoden Tactics.

== Biography ==
A newly hired artist at Konami in 1993, Kawano was assigned to create an RPG along with writer Yoshitaka Murayama, another newcomer to the company. The project was initially intended for an internally developed video game console, which was scrapped, but it was later reopened to be included as one of Konami's first games for Sony's upcoming PlayStation console.

Kawano was not directly involved with the following two entries to the series, instead writing, producing and designing her own title, the adventure game Shadow of Memories (titled Shadow of Destiny in North America). It was released for the PlayStation 2 in 2001 to generally positive reviews, and later ported to Windows/PC, Xbox and PSP. Kawano took creative control of the series following departures from the Suikoden team in July 2002, including series creator Murayama, just a month before the release of Suikoden III. Kawano wrote and designed Suikoden IV in 2004 and the spinoff Suikoden Tactics in 2005, with plans for further installments on the PlayStation 3 that were never realized.

She made a successor to Shadow of Memories in 2008, titled Time Hollow, and the adventure puzzle game Zack & Ombra: The Phantom Amusement Park in 2010, both for the Nintendo DS. In 2020, Kawano co-founded Rabbit & Bear Studios, reuniting with former Suikoden developers, including series creator Yoshitaka Murayama. She worked as a character designer for Eiyuden Chronicle: Hundred Heroes, a spiritual successor to Suikoden, released in 2024.

== Works ==
Game	Role	Release	Platform
Suikoden	Designer	1995	PlayStation, Saturn, Windows
Suikoden II	Other (Ending Theme "La passione commuove la storia")	1998	PlayStation, Windows, Mobile
Twinbee RPG	Planner	1998	PlayStation
Diver's Dream	Original Planner	1999	PlayStation
Shadow of Memories	Writer, director, Character Designer, Voice Actress (Cat)	2001	PlayStation 2, Windows, Xbox, PSP
Suikoden IV	Writer, producer, designer	2004	PlayStation 2
Suikoden Tactics	Writer, producer, designer	2005	PlayStation 2
Suikoden V	Special Thanks	2006	PlayStation 2
Time Hollow	Writer, designer	2008	Nintendo DS
Zack & Ombra: The Phantom Amusement Park	Writer, director	2010	Nintendo DS
Eiyuden Chronicle: Rising	Character designer	2022	Nintendo Switch, PlayStation 4, PlayStation 5, Windows, Xbox One, Xbox Series X/S
Eiyuden Chronicle: Hundred Heroes	Character designer	2024	Nintendo Switch, PlayStation 4, PlayStation 5, Windows, Xbox One, Xbox Series X/S
