= Gensō Suikogaiden =

Gensō Suikogaiden Volume 1: Swordsman of Harmonia
- Developer: Konami Computer Entertainment Tokyo
- Publisher: Konami
- Artist: Shou Yashioka
- Composers: Miki Higashino; Keiko Fukami
- Series: Suikoden
- Platform: PlayStation
- Release: JP: September 21, 2000
- Genre: Visual novel
- Mode: Single player

Gensō Suikogaiden (Japanese: 幻想水滸外伝) is a two volume series of spin-offs from the Suikoden series of role-playing video games. Suikogaiden Volume 1: Swordsman of Harmonia (幻想水滸外伝Vol.1 ハルモニアの剣士, Gensō Suikogaiden Vol.1 Harumonia no Kenshi) was released in the autumn of 1999; Volume 2: Duel at Crystal Valley (幻想水滸外伝Vol.2 クリスタルバレーの決闘, Gensō Suikogaiden Vol.2 Kurisutaru Barē no Kettō) was released in the spring of 2001. Both volumes are visual novels, rather than role-playing games the other Suikodens are known for. The games were only released in Japan and never officially translated into other languages.

The events of the game intersect with those of Suikoden II, but are more of a side story, hence the name gaiden.

== Volume 1: Swordsman of Harmonia ==
Nash Latjke, the game's protagonist

Nash Latkje, the protagonist controlled by the player and an agent of Holy Harmonia's Southern Border Defence Force, has been assigned to obtain information to either verify or disprove a rumour concerning the appearance of one of the 27 True Runes in the Jowston City States. During his travels, he encounters Sierra Mikain, a female vampire, who decides to accompany him on his journey. As a result, he soon becomes entangled in the larger conflict involving the events of Suikoden II.

== Volume 2: Duel at Crystal Valley ==
Julie Latjke, Nash's sister

Gensō Suikogaiden Volume 2: Duel at the Crystal Valley
- Developer: Konami Computer Entertainment Tokyo
- Publisher: Konami
- Composers: Miki Higashino; Keiko Fukami
- Series: Suikoden
- Platform: PlayStation
- Release: JP: March 22, 2001
- Genre: Visual novel
- Mode: Single player

After the completion of the Dunan Unification Wars (the events of Suikoden II), Nash intends to return to the capital of Holy Harmonia, the Crystal Valley. However, his travels involve more adventure than he anticipates.

His journey involves traveling through the Grasslands, where one village happens to be celebrating the legend of the Flame Champion and the Fire Bringers who stopped the Harmonians from invading some sixty years ago; an unfortunate stop over in Caleria, the base of operations for mercenaries of Southern Harmonian Border Defence Force; helping stop a wild dragon from terrorizing a village before finally reaching his destination.

As Volume 2 was released roughly a year before Suikoden III, it presumably helped set up and introduce the Grasslands, which were the main focus of Suikoden III. Nash also returns in Suikoden III; outside Japan, Suikoden III is Nash's first appearance in the series.

== Development ==
The Suikogaiden games were made by a separate development group at Konami. After Duel at Crystal Valley was completed, the Suikoden III team and the Suikogaiden team merged and began work on both Suikoden IV and Suikoden V.

== English fan translation ==
In August and September 2013, fan translations of both games were released to the public by a group of Suikoden fans led by RinUzuki.
