= Kuniyuki Takahashi =

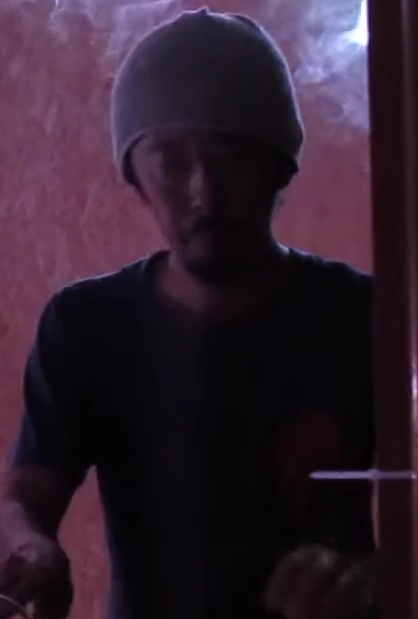
- Takahashi performing in 2011

Background information
- Born: 高橋邦之
- Origin: Sapporo, Hokkaido, Japan
- Genres: Deep house, future jazz, experimental
- Occupations: sound engineer, producer, DJ
- Labels: Mule Musiq, Life Line, Sacred Rhythm Music, et al.

Kuniyuki Takahashi (often best known simply as Kuni or Kuniyuki) is a Japanese DJ and music producer, sound engineer from Sapporo, Hokkaido, Japan.

He records under many different aliases depending on the style of music he is producing, including Forth (dub techno/acid house), Frr Hive (downtempo/drum n' bass), Koss (for techno). He was also a joint member of the group DRP (Deutsches Reichs Patent) along with other member Tomoyuki Murashige. He has also composed music for Suikoden V, as well as ringtones for Crypton Future Media, which were distributed via its G6.COM website.

His productions generally fit mainly within the house music and techno styles of electronic music.

== Releases ==
Most releases are listed below, with many additional remixes not listed.

=== Kuniyuki Takahashi ===
Albums

- We Are Together (Mule Musiq Distribution, 2006)
- Live At Kompakt Night (Mule Electronic, 2006)
- Journey (Mule Musiq Distribution, 2006)
- All These Things (Mule Musiq Distribution, 2007)
- Remixed (Mule Musiq Distribution, 2008)
- Walking In The Naked City (Mule Musiq, 2010)
- Dancing In The Naked City (Mule Musiq, 2011)
- Mule Musiq Sampler (Mule Musiq Distribution, 2012)
- Remixed 2 [2×CD] (Mule Musiq, 2013)
- Feather World (Mule Musiq, 2013)

Singles, EPs, 12"s

- Precious Hall [12"] (Natural Resource, 2002)
- Kids Breath [2×12"] (Life Line, 2002)
- Earth Beats [12"] (Mule Musiq, 2005)
- Sun Shine [12"] (Mule Musiq, 2005)
- Think Of You / Melody At The Night [12"] (Mule Musiq, 2006)
- We Are Together EP [12"] (Mule Musiq, 2006)
- Sekai No Ichiban Tooi Tochi E [12"] (Mule Musiq, 2006)
- Remixed Vol.3 [12"] (Mule Musiq, 2008)
- Remixed Vol.1 [12"] (Mule Musiq, 2008)
- Flying Music [12"] (Mule Musiq, 2008)
- All These Things EP [12"] (Mule Musiq, 2008)
- Remixed Vol.2 [12"] (Mule Musiq, 2008)
- Henrik Schwarz And Kuniyuki (Ft. Yoshihiro Tsukahara) – The Session [12"] (Mule Musiq, 2008)
- Remixed Vol. 4 [12"] (Mule Musiq, 2009)
- Henrik Schwarz & Kuniyuki – Once Again [12"] (Mule Musiq, 2010)
- Set Me Free [12"] (Mule Musiq, 2010)
- Night Forest [12"] (Mule Musiq, 2010)
- All These Things (Joaquin Joe Claussell Remix) [12"] (Mule Musiq, 2011)
- Bamboo City [12"] (Mule Musiq, 2011)
- Vakula & Kuniyuki – Session North #1 / Passage To The Moon [12"] (Soundofspeed, 2012)
- Kuniyuki Takahashi (Ft. Henrik Schwarz) – The Session 2 [12"] (Mule Musiq, 2013)
- Shout [12"] (Mule Musiq, 2013)
- Kuniyuki (Ft. Anne Clark) – Between Shadow And Lights [12"] (Mule Musiq, 2013)

=== Forth ===
- Die-Sun (Tarot Dub No. 79 Mix) on Analog In My Mind Issue 2 [Compilation] (Dubrex Records, 1995)

=== Frr Hive ===
- Rose Trumpet Herb [Album] (Bassmental, 1997)
- Rose Trumpet Herb / Knife / Dying Room [12"] (Bassmental, 1997)

=== Koss ===
Albums

- Ring (Soundofspeed, 2001)
- Live Ring (Soundofspeed, 2002)
- Koss a.k.a. Kuniyuki Takahashi – Live At Kompakt Night (Mule Electronic, 2006)
- Four Worlds Converge As One (Mule Electronic Distribution, 2006)
- Ancient Rain (Mule Electronic Distribution, 2008)
- Mnml Ssgs (Mnml ssgs, 2009)
- Koss / Henriksson / Mullaert – The Möllan Sessions [2×CD] (Mule Electronic, 2011)
- Silence (Mule Musiq, 2015)

Singles, EPs,12"s

- Ring 01 [12"] (Mule Electronic, 2005)
- Ring 02 [12"] (Mule Electronic, 2005)
- Ra1030in [12"] (Mule Electronic, 2006)
- Earth [12"] (Mule Electronic, 2008)
- Ocean Waves [12"] (Mule Electronic, 2010)
- Koss / Mullaert / Henriksson – One [12"] (Mule Electronic, 2011)
- Koss / Henriksson / Mullaert – The Möllan Session Edit Pt.2 [12"] (Mule Electronic, 2012)
- Koss / Henriksson / Mullaert – The Möllan Session Edit Pt. 1 [12"] (Mule Electronic, 2012)
