= Time Hollow =

2008 video game

- Developer: Tenky
- Publisher: Konami
- Designer: Junko Kawano
- Writer: Junko Kawano
- Composer: Junichi Yoshida
- Platform: Nintendo DS
- Release: JP: March 19, 2008; NA: September 23, 2008; EU: February 6, 2009
- Genres: Adventure, visual novel
- Mode: Single-player

Time Hollow (TIME HOLLOW 奪われた過去を求めて, Taimu Horou Ubawareta Kako o Motomete; lit. Time Hollow: Search for the Stolen Past) is a Japanese adventure visual novel video game developed and published by Konami for the Nintendo DS video game console. The game was released in Japan on March 19, 2008, North America on September 23, 2008, and Europe on February 6, 2009. The game was written by Junko Kawano, whose PlayStation 2 work Shadow of Memories also features a young man using a time-travelling device to try and alter his future.

== Gameplay ==
Time Hollow is a graphic adventure game, in which the player controls protagonist Ethan Kairos as he attempts to find his missing parents. Using the "Hollow Pen", he is able to open circular portals into the past after he has experienced a "flashback" of a certain location. By opening portals into different areas, he is able to recover or place items and people, as well as observe the past. Although time stops while a portal is open, certain characters are able to interact with Ethan. The player must draw these portals with the stylus, and once the portal is closed, a certain amount of "Time" is lost, equivalent to HP. Portions of Time equivalent to one portal, called "Chrons", can be recovered by finding Ethan's cat, Sox, in the game world. The game is supplemented by animated cut scenes showing important events and flashbacks. Backgrounds are static, and layered to provide a 3D perspective effect when they are moved from side to side.

== Plot ==
Time Hollow follows the story of Ethan Kairos, whose parents, Timothy and Pamela Kairos, mysteriously disappear on his 17th birthday. Ethan realizes that the entire world has changed as if his parents had disappeared 12 years ago. Ethan then finds a strange green pen with the ability to open portals to the past and a note tied to his cats collar telling him to look in a dumpster behind his school, there he finds a note from his father. Ethan uses the pen to solve problems that suddenly and mysteriously occur, thus changing the present, though he himself is able to remember these past parallel universes. He also meets a girl, Kori Twelves, who seems to share Ethan's displacement from time. Eventually, Ethan comes to realize that the past is being manipulated by another Hollow Pen wielder, Irving Onegin, as revenge for the fact that Ethan supposedly killed his mother. After a final confrontation, Irving steps through his own portal, taking the identity of Ethan's teacher in order to exact his plan. After thwarting a series of determined attempts to murder his friends by Irving, he saves his parents from a restaurant explosion that caused their disappearance. He confronts Irving again, causing him to fall off a cliff. Ethan realizes that Irving's mother committed suicide using her own Hollow Pen out of guilt for the fact that she could not prevent her son from killing Kori. Ethan's uncle volunteers to save Kori after Irving attempts to murder her, preventing Irving from ever causing the events of the game. At the end of the game, Ethan sends the pen and note back to his past self to prevent a time paradox.

=== Characters ===
Note: All of the characters' last names are references to numbers or time.

- Ethan Kairos/Horou Tokio (時尾 歩郎, Tokio Horō)

Ethan Kairos

The main character of Time Hollow, a normal high school student who lives with his family. On the morning of his seventeenth birthday, he discovered that the world had changed into one where his parents went missing 12 years ago. In order to solve this mystery, he takes up the Hollow Pen, which has the power to change history.

"Tokio Horō" is a pun on the Japanese pronunciation of the word "hollow" as well as on "time corridor" (toki no horou). His English last name is Latin for "the fullness of time." Kairos (καιρός) is an ancient Greek word meaning the right or opportune moment (the supreme moment). The ancient Greeks had two words for time, chronos and kairos. While the former refers to chronological or sequential time, the latter signifies a time in between, a moment of undetermined period of time in which something special happens. What the special something is depends on who is using the word.

- Timothy Kairos/Wataru Tokio (時尾 亘, Tokio Wataru)

Ethan's Father. At his son's 17th birthday, both he and his wife disappeared. He investigated the death of one of his classmate's mother, Mary Onegin.

Timothy's Japanese is a homonym for "to cross time" (toki o wataru).

- Pamela Kairos/Aki Tokio (時尾 秋, Tokio Aki)

Ethan's Mother. She has a cheerful personality and doesn't focus on difficult problems, but she's a caring mother who always puts her family first. She is said to have disappeared 12 years ago along with her husband Timothy.

Aki means "autumn."

- Derek Kairos/Tamotsu Tokio (時尾 保, Tokio Tamotsu)

Ethan's uncle, Timothy's younger brother. A freelance writer engaged in chasing the long-ago incident. He's brusque, and has a serious disposition. Although it seems he did not get along well with his older brother, he took Ethan in after Timothy and Pamela disappeared. He was the original founder of the Chronos café.

Derek's Japanese name means "to preserve time" (toki o tamotsu).

- Sox/Follow (フォ郎, Forō)

Ethan's pet cat, who is attached to Ethan, and often sleeps on his bed.

'Forou' can also be pronounced as 'Horou' (Hollow).

- Irving Onegin/Seisaku Ichiyanagi (一柳 清作, Ichiyanagi Seisaku)

The main villain. Originally posing as an antiques dealer, he has been altering time to mess with the Kairos family and Ethan's friends.

- Mary Onegin/Naoko Ichiyanagi (一柳 奈緒子, Ichiyanagi Naoko)

Irving's mother, who also possesses a hollow pen, which means she remains active when a time hole is opened. She died in a bus accident 35 years ago, which motivates Irving to get revenge on the Kairos family.

- Jack Twombly/Sakutarou Ninomiya (二宮 朔太郎, Ninomiya Sakutarō)

Ethan's teacher. He also taught Derek and Timothy.

- Vin Threet/Motoki Mihara (三原 元樹, Mihara Motoki)

One of Ethan's friends. He was once a basketball star, but he broke his hip. He is often resentful of his sister, but is concerned when something happens to her.

- Ashley Threet/Waori Mihara (三原 和織, Mihara Waori)

Vin's younger sister. She and her friend Emily both seem to have a crush on Ethan. She often gets into trouble as a result of Irving's interference.

- Ben Fourier/Shunta Shidou (四堂 駿太, Shidō Shunta)

One of Ethan's friends. He has a problem with dogs because Shiloh was killed in a thunderstorm long ago when he was supposed to be watching him. He likes to chase after pretty, older girls.

- Morris Fivet/Nagi Goshima (五島 凪, Goshima Nagi)

One of Ethan's friends. He is extremely serious about studying, and can be easily stressed about his marks. Ethan briefly confides in him, but he forgets after reality is rewritten. He drops out of high school and starts up a dog-walking service in one of the alternate realities.

- Eva Sixon/Kotoko Rokujou (六条 琴子, Rokujō Kotoko)

The new owner of Chronos after Derek sells it. She likes to gossip.

- Aaron Seven/Ryuunosuke Nanasawa (七沢 竜之介, Nanasawa Ryūnosuke)

Olivia's boyfriend. He's kind of a jerk.

- Olivia Eights/Mayu Yagi (八木 まゆ, Yagi Mayu)

Waitress at Chronos. Ben has a crush on her, although she is dating Aaron. She parks her bicycle outside Chronos every day.

- Emily Niner/Shouko Kuri (九里 祥子, Kuri Shōko)

Ashley's shy, bespectacled friend. She takes up fortune-telling and accurately predicts incident points for Ethan, which doubles as an in-game hint device.

- Sara Tenneson/Sonoka Tokura (十倉 想乃香, Tokura Sonoka)

Librarian at Kako Library. She often helps Ethan by looking up articles.

- Jacob Eleven/Arata Juuichitani (十一谷 新, Jūichitani Arata)

A little boy that often gets involved in incidents. He owns a dog named Lucky.

- Kori Twelves/Kanon Juunibayashi (十二林 かのん, Jūnibayashi Kanon)

The mysterious girl that is at the center of all of this. Timothy pulls her out of time when she falls off the roof, to prevent Derek from killing himself. Both Ethan and Derek have feelings for her. Being pulled out of time, she also gets flashbacks and can move when time holes are open.

- Shiloh/Shiro (シロ, Shiro)

The dog that was kept at the secret hideout. After Ethan saves him, Ben adopts him and is often walked by Morris.

== Reception ==
Reception

Aggregate score
Aggregator	Score
Metacritic	64 of 100

Review scores
Publication	Score
1Up.com	C+
Adventure Gamers	4 of 5
Edge	6 of 10
Famitsu	32 of 40
Game Informer	7 of 10
GameSpot	5.5 of 10
IGN	7 of 10
Nintendo Life	7 of 10
Nintendo Power	7 of 10
Official Nintendo Magazine	64%

Time Hollow received "mixed" reviews according to video game review aggregator Metacritic. GameSpot praised its "great concept" and "vivid artwork", but thought that the gameplay was "overly simple" and "restrictively linear," with "very little for you to figure out for yourself." IGN commended the plot, but complained that "only a handful of characters are interesting enough to care about." In Japan, Famitsu gave the game a score of all four eights for a total of 32 out of 40.

== Legacy ==
The main theme song of the game was composed and arranged by Masanori Akita, and also appeared on the Japanese PlayStation 2 version of Dance Dance Revolution SuperNova 2, the Arcade and North American PlayStation 2 version of Dance Dance Revolution X.
