= Suikoden I & II =

2006 video game

- Developer: Konami
- Publisher: Konami
- Series: Suikoden
- Engine: Unity (HD Remaster)
- Platforms: PlayStation Portable; Nintendo Switch; PlayStation 4; PlayStation 5; Windows; Xbox One; Xbox Series X/S; Nintendo Switch 2
- Release: PlayStation Portable: JP: February 23, 2006; Nintendo Switch, PlayStation 4, PlayStation 5, Windows, Xbox One, Xbox Series X/S: WW: March 6, 2025; Nintendo Switch 2: WW: June 5, 2025
- Genre: Role-playing
- Mode: Single-player

Suikoden I & II (Note: Japanese: 幻想水滸伝I&II, Hepburn: Gensō Suikoden I& II) is a 2006 video game compilation developed and published by Konami for the PlayStation Portable. It contains enhanced ports of the first two games in the Suikoden series, Suikoden (1995) and Suikoden II (1998) for the PlayStation Portable. Both games are combined in one Universal Media Disc (UMD), in which the player can choose which Suikoden game they want to play, as well as a third choice which is "Gallery" (ギャラリー).

A high-definition English localization version of the compilation, under the title Suikoden I & II HD Remaster: Gate Rune and Dunan Unification Wars was announced on September 16, 2022. It includes graphical improvements such as enhanced backgrounds and redrawn portraits, new and enhanced sound effects, new world map system, and quality of life features such as a fast-forward toggle for battles. It was originally scheduled for a worldwide release in 2023 for Nintendo Switch, PlayStation 4, Windows and Xbox One but on August 30, 2023, it was announced that the remaster had been delayed. On August 27, 2024, it was announced that the remaster had been rescheduled for a March 6, 2025 release date and would also be released for PlayStation 5 and Xbox Series X/S. On April 24, 2025, a Nintendo Switch 2 version was announced as a launch title for the system on June 5, 2025.

== Development ==
Several changes from the original versions were made for this compilation. The player is now able to move their character diagonally inside places and over the world map. Graphics have been slightly enhanced and redone to fit widescreen. This includes an extension of some places which were designed for PAL and NTSC televisions.

== Reception ==
Reception

Aggregate score
Aggregator	Score
Metacritic	(NS) 82/100 (PC) 82/100 (PS5) 81/100

Review scores
Publication	Score
GameSpot	6/10
Nintendo Life	8/10
Nintendo World Report	8.5/10
PC Gamer (US)	79/100
Push Square	8/10
RPGFan	92/100

The remastered version of Suikoden I & II received "generally favorable" reviews from critics, according to review aggregator website Metacritic.

Suikoden I & II sold 21,707 copies in Japan, considered low based on the critical reception of the original games.
