= Futch =

Futch is a surname. Notable people with the surname include:

- Bing Futch (born 1966), American musician
- Eddie Futch (1911–2001), American boxing trainer
- Theodore Leslie Futch (1895–1992), American Army officer
- Truman Futch (1891–1960), American politician and judge
- Eric Futch (born 1993), American Athlete

Futch may also refer to:

- Futch, an LGBT slang, named after butch and femme.
