= Suikoden Tactics =

2005 video game

- Developer: Konami
- Publisher: Konami
- Director: Osamu Komuta
- Producer: Junko Kawano
- Designer: Osamu Komuta
- Artist: Junko Kawano
- Writer: Junko Kawano
- Composer: Norikazu Miura
- Series: Suikoden
- Platform: PlayStation 2
- Release: JP: September 22, 2005; NA: November 8, 2005; EU: February 24, 2006
- Genre: Tactical role-playing game
- Mode: Single-player

Suikoden Tactics, originally released in Japan as Rhapsodia (ラプソディア, Rapusodia), is a tactical role-playing video game developed and published by Konami for the PlayStation 2 console as part of their Suikoden series. Initially released in Japan and North America in late 2005, the game was later made available in Europe and the PAL region in early 2006. It is the first strategy-based installment of the series, using tactical, grid-based combat instead of the turn-based battles employed by previous games in the series. The game's music was composed by series veteran Norikazu Miura and features the opening theme "Another World" performed by Japanese vocalist yoshiko.

The game's fantasy story is told in two parts, taking place both before and after the events of Suikoden IV released one year earlier, and features appearances by characters from the title. Players assume the role of Kyril, a young man investigating the power of mysterious weapons called "Rune Cannons," which hold strange powers of transformation.

== Gameplay ==
A battle sequence

Suikoden Tactics is a tactical role-playing game and thus shares many traits with the genre. The player controls a young man named Kyril, and advances the plot by completing tactical battles and talking with other characters. The player can also recruit new characters to his cause, which often involves a short sidequest. In towns, the player can gather information, sharpen character's weaponry, learn new skills, and buy equipment. Each character may use special "Runes" or items to imbue terrain squares with various elements. Characters each have a particular element on which their attack and defence is boosted by a significant amount when they occupy a space with the corresponding element, and the reverse is true if the character occupies a space with an element the character is weak to.

Another feature of the battle system in Suikoden Tactics is its use of supporting characters. Such characters have no offensive value, as they can not attack, but impart various effects on the playing field such as healing, stealing, digging, and stat buffing.

Aside from that, the elemental runes and weapon runes from previous games return. Elemental Runes all have as their level 1 spell, a magic that turns an area of the playing field of a certain element. Weapon runes in Suikoden Tactics operate differently from previous Suikoden games. Instead of a single attack with infinite uses, weapon runes impart three different attacks that operate similarly to spell runes, as each attack is defined by a certain number of charges before it can no longer be used, although all MP would be recharged upon a level-up.

== Story ==
The story of Suikoden Tactics begins about seven years before the events of Suikoden IV, and establishes the reason why Kyril is determined to search out and destroy the Rune Cannons. The prequel part of Suikoden Tactics ends with a traumatic event for Kyril, and how Brandeau gains the possession of the Rune of Punishment.

The game leaps forward about three years after the events of Suikoden IV takes place. From here on, Kyril begins his investigation on Rune Cannons and eventually leads him north into the Kooluk Empire. Kyril meets a mysterious man, Iskas, who hints at a connection between Rune Cannons and Kooluk. From there, Kyril investigates further about connections between Kooluk and Rune Cannons, and soon leads Kyril to Kika and her pirate crew. Clues turn Kyril's journey north, first to the fortress of El Eal, then finally into the Kooluk Empire itself.

During his investigation in the Kooluk Empire, Kyril and his company meets up with a young aristocrat girl named Corselia, who is later revealed as the granddaughter of the Emperor of the Kooluk Empire. It is also here that Iskas finally reveals his real intentions and begins a plot to antagonize Kyril.

== Soundtrack ==
The music for Suikoden Tactics was composed and arranged by Norikazu Miura, who would go on to also compose the soundtrack of Suikoden V. The opening theme "Another World" was performed by yoshiko. The music was released first as the Rhapsodia Privilege Collection was released on September 22, 2005. It is a single CD containing selected tracks from the game as well as remixes from other Suikoden soundtracks. It also features a preview of "Castle of Dawn," the music for the Ceras Lake castle in Suikoden V, which was at the time unpublished. A week later on September 28, the Rhapsodia Original Soundtrack was released as a full compilation of the music in the game over 2 CDs.

== Reception ==
Reception

Aggregate score
Aggregator	Score
Metacritic	68 / 100

Review scores
Publication	Score
Electronic Gaming Monthly	7.33 / 10
Eurogamer	5 / 10
Famitsu	31 / 40
Game Informer	6.75 / 10
GameSpot	7.6 / 10
GameSpy	3/5
GameZone	6.6 / 10
IGN	7.3 / 10
Official U.S. PlayStation Magazine	3/5
X-Play	3/5

Suikoden Tactics was met with a fairly positive response in Japan, selling approximately 64,472 within its first year, enough to qualify it for a re-release under Sony's "PlayStation the Best" distinction in November 2006 at a budget price. Famitsu gave it a score of two eights, one seven, and one eight for a total of 31 out of 40.

In the west, the game received "average" reviews according to the review aggregation website Metacritic. GameSpot praised the game's user-friendliness and battle design, stating that the game was "fun for veterans and newcomers alike", yet found the game's "weak story and characters" and "spotty voice acting" to be its low points. IGN also found the game's battle system to be engaging, but ultimately declared the game's plot to be "paltry", urging the player to "[e]xpect more from battles rather than plotlines." Conversely, Game Informer found the game too confusing with haphazard battle scenes, stating, "I'd rather have a simple and well-balanced game than a complicated and lopsided one, and Suikoden Tactics definitely has too many short legs." Official U.S. PlayStation Magazine stated that the gameplay "works when it's not broken", but was hindered by "boring" story sequences and "awful" graphics.

Eurogamer found the game to be lackluster when compared to other tactical-based role-playing games, particularly those developed by Nippon Ichi Software, declaring that Suikoden Tactics's "[b]attles are fun and fairly compulsive but this is a game we've played many times over, usually presented better, executed more beautifully and intertwined with a far superior story." G4's X-Play echoed their sentiment, stating that "despite some interesting play mechanics, it's not nearly as deep as some of the other games on the market right now."
