= Suikoden III =

2002 video game

- Developer: Konami Computer Entertainment Tokyo
- Publisher: Konami
- Directors: Yoshitaka Murayama; Keiichi Isobe
- Producer: Noritada Matsukawa
- Artist: Fumi Ishikawa
- Composers: Michiru Yamane; Takashi Yoshida; Masahiko Kimura
- Series: Suikoden
- Engine: RenderWare
- Platform: PlayStation 2
- Release: JP: July 11, 2002; NA: October 22, 2002
- Genre: Role-playing
- Mode: Single-player

Suikoden III (Japanese: 幻想水滸伝III, Hepburn: Gensō Suikoden Surī) is a role-playing video game developed by Konami Computer Entertainment Tokyo and published by Konami for the PlayStation 2 video game console, and the third installment in the Suikoden video game series. It was released in 2002 in Japan and North America, with a manga adaption published in 2004.

The game follows the perspectives of three protagonists, each revolving around a conflict between the Grassland tribes, the merchant nation of the Zexens, and the warmongering Harmonia. Eventually, the three set out on a quest to recruit the 108 stars of Destiny to prevent a potential outbreak of war.

== Mechanics ==
Like other games in the series, Suikoden III features an intricate, detailed setting. The game's story is presented through the "Trinity Sight System"; rather than having only one "hero", the plot is explored through three different viewpoints, allowing events to be seen from multiple sides. There are three struggling factions in Suikoden III, each with their own divisions and politics, and there is no unambiguous "right" side. Hugo of the Karaya Clan is a Grasslander, Chris Lightfellow is a Knight of the merchant nation of Zexen, and Geddoe is a member of the Harmonian Southern Frontier Defense Force, keeping watch for the huge nation of Harmonia on the Grasslands area.

The named "hero" chosen by the player at the beginning of the game is actually the Flame Champion, the Grassland leader who upheld the independence of the Grasslands against a Harmonian incursion decades ago. Unlike other Suikoden games, which generally feature a silent protagonist, the Flame Champion and the other main characters all have personalities and dialog.

== Gameplay ==
Suikoden III shares many elements with other role-playing video games. The player controls the current protagonist and travels with them around the world map, advancing the plot by completing tasks and talking with other characters. In towns, they can gather information, sharpen their weaponry, learn new skills, and buy equipment; wilderness areas generally feature random encounters with monsters. Aside from the main plot, after a certain point in each main character's chapters, they may recruit new characters to go to Budehuc castle. Recruiting a character often requires a short sidequest or other mission. Unlike Suikoden II and Suikoden V, Suikoden III has no "time limits" for character recruitment; assuming certain plot decisions are made "correctly," it is always possible to recruit all 108 Stars of Destiny.

As in other RPGS, characters in Suikoden III possess a variety of statistics that determine in-game combat ability. However, characters can also learn specific skills; for instance, the "Parry" skill allows a character to defend against attacks more often, while other skills may increase damage output or hasten the casting of spells. Different characters have affinities for different skills, and their own maximum limit on the number of skills they can learn. Parties may consist of up to 6 characters who participate in combat and one "support" character who adds a special skill to the party, such as minor healing after battle. If all 6 characters lose all their hit points (and are thus incapacitated), it is game over and the player must restart. Exceptions exist for certain plot battles in which winning is optional; the player can lose and the plot continues on, albeit in a slightly different fashion.

Battles in Suikoden III take place on a continuous field of battle, unlike the static front and back rows of earlier Suikodens. Characters are still aligned in rows at the onset of battle, but the front and back character in each row are controlled as a pair. For example, selecting to cast a rune spell with the character in the back row of the pair will cause the character in the front row to defend them while they are casting. On the other hand, choosing to attack will cause a character in the front row to move towards the enemy and strike.

Runes, the primary source of magic in the world of Suikoden, are generally handled similarly to other Suikoden games. Characters have a certain number of spell usages per "spell level;" for instance, a character with 4 level 1 spell slots and a Water Rune could cast "Kindness Drops" (the level 1 Water Rune spell) 4 times. Other runes offer different benefits, and some may be used as often as desired. Since Suikoden III's combat takes place on a free movement field, some of the rune effects were reinterpreted from other games to strike areas. For example, some Fire rune effects that only struck enemies in earlier Suikoden games now strike a generalized area, meaning they could affect allies who moved in too close. The rune spells cause the caster to begin chanting. While in this state the character can be struck to slow or halt the casting time. The time required for chanting varies depending on the abilities of the character and the magnitude of the spell.

At certain points in the game, armies clash and a strategic battle system is used, similar to those seen in military turn-based strategy games. These are set on a graph, a set of connected vertices. Certain places on the map offer special advantages for units occupying them, such as a defense bonus for a forest or castle ramparts, or automatic free healing for a base of operations. When attacking, units in other nodes adjoining the attacked space can aid, giving a bonus to the attack. When army units engage in combat (generally by one unit moving into a space occupied by a hostile unit), the standard Suikoden III battle system is used, albeit an extremely sped-up variety in which no orders are issued and characters act on a simple AI. Leaders can aid their army units with a variety of special abilities and rune magic. Each side also requires a strategist; the better the strategist, the more moves that side can take before their turn is over. Strategy battles end when the pre-set mission objectives are completed, generally either to take a node on the map for offensive missions, or to successfully hold a node or escape for defensive engagements. Alternatively, they can end in failure if a main character is defeated.

Suikoden III also features a number of minigames, such as gambling on dice, card games, and horse racing. These minigames are generally accessible from Budehuc castle.

== Setting ==
Suikoden III is set in IS 475, roughly 16 in-game years after the events of Suikoden II. The game takes place in the diverse Grasslands region, an area to the northwest of Dunan from Suikoden II (which itself was to the north of the Toran area from Suikoden). Politically, the Grasslands are mostly controlled by the Six Clans, a loose coalition between the Karaya, Lizard, Duck, Chisha, Safir and Alma Kinan clans. The clans are considered rather backward and barbaric by neighboring powers, and the clans have comparatively smaller towns than the cities seen elsewhere in the Suikoden universe. On the western coast, the merchant nation of Zexen thrives. The Zexens were an ignored offshoot of the Grassland clans long ago, and have since grown to be powerful and independent. Their architecture, politics, and citizenry are similar to Renaissance Western European civilizations. To the east lie imposing mountains and eventually Harmonia, a gigantic and populous nation. Harmonia maintains outposts along the border, notably the submissive, conquered town of Le Buque, formerly a clan from the Grasslands, and the trading citadel Caleria.

All magic in the world of Suikoden comes from Runes. Any person can have a rune inscribed on them, although some people are more talented in their use, and others can inscribe more than one rune (with three as the general maximum). In turn, all power from individual carved runes ultimately descends from the 27 True Runes, which created the world in Suikoden's mythology. Bearers of a True Rune gain tremendous power and do not age; these Runes are thus hotly contested.

Around 50 years prior to the start of Suikoden III, Harmonia attempted to extend its control over the Grasslands, and eventually invaded. Resistance was fierce, and eventually a successful leader known as the Flame Champion emerged from among the clans who was said to bear the True Fire Rune. His followers—considered bandits by the Harmonians—raided the Harmonians constantly and became known as the Fire Bringer. Eventually, a titanic clash was fought between the combined armies of the Grasslands and Harmonia. In it, the Flame Champion unleashed the full power of the True Fire Rune, and both sides suffered tremendous casualties in the resulting raging fire. The battle was a draw, but Harmonia withdrew nevertheless, unwilling to pay any more lives for the land, and a truce was signed.

== Plot ==
The Trinity Sight System contains three chronological chapters per character. Players have the ability to switch characters and point of view after the end of each chapter.

=== Hugo's point of view ===
Hugo is the son of the chief of the Karaya Clan. He is sent to visit the Zexen capital to deliver a truce offer for the Clans, who had been clashing against Zexen recently. The visit goes wrong, and Hugo is forced to flee back to Karaya, only to find it in flames. His childhood friend, Lulu, is then slain by Chris Lightfellow. Eager for revenge and to help defend the Clans, Hugo travels the Grasslands, eventually reuniting with the other Karayans in exile at the Lizard Clan's Great Hollow. He learns from the Flame Champion's story, and eventually seeks out the Flame Champion for aid with the Clans set upon by both the Zexens and, in Chisha village, the Harmonians.

=== Chris's point of view ===
Chris Lightfellow is the Acting Captain of the Zexen Knights. Respected and revered as a hero, she is known as the 'Silver Maiden'. While she is dedicated to protecting her country and people, Chris finds herself increasingly frustrated with the Zexen Council, disagreeing with their methods. This dilemma only worsens as the conflict with the Grassland clans increases.

Chris commands the Zexen forces against the Grassland clans early in the game, fighting them at the botched truce agreement, the Karaya village (where she kills Hugo's friend Lulu), and the Lizard's Great Hollow. At Iksay Village, where she helps fend off a combined assault by the Lizard and Karaya clans, she finds that her missing and assumed dead father Wyatt may still be alive. She sets off on a personal journey throughout the Grasslands to find him and whatever traces she can as to the nature of recent events. In doing so, Chris also comes to meet and learn more of the people she has been fighting.

=== Geddoe's point of view ===
Geddoe is the reserved and enigmatic leader of the Twelfth Harmonian Southern Fringe Defense Force Unit, a band of mercenaries under the employ of Harmonia. He is charged with investigating rumors of the resurgence of the Fire Bringer. As a somewhat neutral observer on the Zexen - Grassland conflict, Geddoe and his band see several of the more provocative moments, such as the inexplicable attack by the Zexens on the Great Hollow, the assassination of the Lizard clan chief, and the burning of Karaya village by the Zexens. Despite Harmonia's orders, Geddoe has his own agenda; he is especially suspicious of a new bishop of Harmonia who always wears a mask.

Eventually Geddoe is ordered to look for the True Fire Rune itself, a rather easy task for him. Geddoe is in truth the bearer of the True Lightning Rune and was a personal companion of the Flame Champion from 50 years ago. He travels to the True Fire Rune in order to defend the Grasslands once more.

Despite his knowledge of history and events, Geddoe does not often divulge his information, preferring to remain enigmatic. Likewise, the members of his team have generally left their pasts behind and use aliases. Geddoe's chapters are also somewhat unusual in that his team changes very little; after saving and recruiting the Karayan Aila, Geddoe's 5 companions stick together, unlike the other chapters in which characters join and leave often.

=== Turning point ===
At the end of each character's Chapter 3, they meet at the Flame Champion's hideout. Up until the end of Chapter 3, it is assumed by Hugo that the Flame Champion was still alive and would now join the group. However, the Flame Champion is not at the hideout; his elderly wife Sana is. The Flame Champion is dead, as he chose to give up his True Rune and age with his wife. At this point, a new Flame Champion is chosen from among the three protagonists by the player. In canon and the manga, Hugo becomes the Flame Champion, though it is emphasized that this "destiny" is not fixed. Afterward, the "Destroyer" forces seen in the background earlier attack to claim the True Fire Rune themselves, and the masked bishop is revealed to be Luc from the earlier Suikoden games. Despite Luc's True Wind Rune, the Destroyers are deterred by protections the old Flame Champion left in his hideout.

=== Chapters 4 and 5 ===
At the onset of Chapter 4, the Harmonian army attacks in force. The new Flame Champion must rally the feuding Grassland and Zexen forces together in a fighting retreat against the larger and better trained Harmonian army. After retreating from the Chisha and Duck clan villages, the unified army makes its stand at the fortified Brass Castle and stops the Harmonian advance. The new Flame Champion may also (at the player's choice) take up the old Flame Champion's name. As Brass Castle is a Zexen stronghold, the unified army decides to make its new base at the more neutral Budehuc Castle, suggested by its master Thomas. Budehuc may also be renamed. Afterward, both Luc's Destroyers and the new Fire Bringer advance to the Sindar Ruins where the True Water Rune is sealed. There, its bearer Jimba — in truth, Wyatt Lightfellow, Chris's father and companion of Geddoe and the original Flame Champion — is slain, and the rune passed on to either Chris or Hugo (if Chris is the Flame Champion).

In Chapter 5, Luc's political scheme evaporates as he engages in his real plan- to steal all the elemental True Runes himself, and use their combined power to destroy his own True Rune that has dominated his destiny. With the aid of Sarah and a series of traps, Luc successfully claims the True Lightning, Fire, and Water runes from the protagonists. He also steals his supposed ally Sasarai's True Earth Rune, guaranteeing Harmonian support against the Destroyers. Though increasingly exhausted, Sarah is still able to summon large quantities of magical monsters to serve as a surrogate army. A second assault against Brass Castle is repulsed by the unified army, and the monster army is chased to the Ceremonial Site, where Luc intends to focus the energies of the True Runes into destroying his Rune. There, the other True Runes are reclaimed, and though Luc defeats Sasarai in a duel, the incarnation of the True Wind Rune which gave Luc his haunting visions is defeated.

=== Other views ===
There are three optional viewpoints in addition to the mandatory ones.

- Thomas, a young minor noble from the northern lands, has two chapters which become available once his castle is visited by the other main characters. After a visit from his illegitimate son Thomas, the Zexen Council member Lowma desires to rid himself of the embarrassment by appointing Thomas as master of the poor and rundown Budehuc castle. To revitalize the castle, Thomas decides to rent out land to potential store owners in order to earn money and promote commerce. With the help of the castle's staff, Thomas travels and recruits Stars of Destiny. However, flouting the Zexen regulations eventually brings trouble upon Budehuc. If the Thomas chapters are not completed by the time the third chapter for each other character has completed, they become unavailable, and Thomas and his acquaintances join the Stars of Destiny in Chapter 4.
- Koroku, a dog, has a short chapter intended for humor. Koroku can listen in to other characters within the castle and eavesdrop, occasionally hearing some interesting dialogue.
- Luc is the main antagonist of the game. If all 108 Stars of Destiny are recruited before the end of the game, then Luc's scenario may be seen, showing his band's plotting and scheming throughout the game.

It is speculated that Sasarai was intended to have an optional chapter as well, due to the fact that all the True Rune holders in the game would then have a chapter. The Sasarai chapter would presumably have replaced Koroku's short chapter.

== Development ==
Suikoden III was developed by the same team as Suikoden II, for the most part. In June 2002, just a month before its release, some of Suikoden III's team left Konami, including series creator Yoshitaka Murayama. Programmer Keiichi Isobe took over as Senior Director after Murayama's departure. With the removal of Murayama and the other's names from the end-credits, fans speculated that a case of corporate meddling had caused him to leave, but Murayama himself denies this and claims their relations remain amicable, and that the omission of credits were due to a Konami company policy of not crediting former employees. The opening video sequence for Suikoden III was developed and produced by the team responsible for animating the Suikogaiden games; following the second Suikogaiden game's completion, the Suikogaiden team and Suikoden III team merged and went on to develop Suikoden IV and Suikoden V.

== Soundtrack ==
A scene from the opening movie, in which "Exceeding Love" plays. It shows one of the protagonists (Hugo, right) and a Star of Destiny.

The music to Suikoden III was composed by Michiru Yamane, Keiko Fukami, and Masahiko Kimura. The vocal to the opening track "Ai wo Koete" (usually translated as "Exceeding Love" or "Transcending Love") was performed by Himekami. The soundtrack was released on 2 CDs on July 24, 2002, as Genso Suikoden III Original Soundtrack. Miki Higashino, who had composed the main Suikoden themes and most of the music in the first two games, did not participate in the soundtrack, which explains the noticeable difference in style from the earlier soundtracks. On September 11, 2002, Genso Suikoden III Collection ~Rustling Wind~ was released, featuring 10 tracks from the game with new arrangements. The arrangement was done by a group calling themselves "bosque aroma" that consisted of Shusei Murai, Jiro Okada, and Mantell Nonoda.

== Sales ==
By the end of 2002, 377,729 copies of Suikoden III were sold in Japan. American sales were 190,000 copies in total.

Konami did not release Suikoden III in PAL territories. A European version was announced but cancelled a few months before release, allegedly due to problems with the conversion tools. Konami's policy at that time was that all PAL games had to be fully translated to the respective languages and that only releasing the game in English was not an option. Petitions to change Konami's decision on the matter were unsuccessful. Suikoden III would finally be released in European territories on June 23, 2015, as a PS2 Classic on PlayStation Network.

== Reception ==
Reception

Aggregate score
Aggregator	Score
Metacritic	86/100

Review scores
Publication	Score
Edge	6/10
Electronic Gaming Monthly	7/10
Famitsu	31/40
Game Informer	9.5/10
GamePro	4.5/5
GameRevolution	B+
GameSpot	9.1/10
GameSpy	4/5
GameZone	7.8/10
IGN	9.4/10
Official U.S. PlayStation Magazine	3/5

The game received "favorable" reviews according to the review aggregation website Metacritic. In Japan, Famitsu gave it a score of 31 out of 40.

GameSpot said that it "had the makings of a classic" and that "the plot is more mature than that of the average 'bad guy threatens to destroy the world' RPG"; its only criticism was that "apart from the striking theme accompanying the opening movie, the music is largely unremarkable." IGN's Jeremy Dunham said that the game was "as close to perfection as I could have hoped. An easy recommendation to any and all RPG fans regardless of their dedication."

Criticisms tended to fall into two camps. Some, such as Official PlayStation Magazine's review, felt that the game dragged too much: "With each chapter I became more discouraged by the lack of action and the overwhelming amounts of story thrust upon me... Suikoden III forces you to spend so much time weaving in and out of the different storylines that you barely have time to enjoy any combat." Others were from some fans of the first two Suikodens who felt that Suikoden III had tampered too much with what they enjoyed of the first two games.

The game won both GameSpot and IGN's RPG of the Year for 2002. It was a runner-up for GameSpot's annual "Best Story on PlayStation 2" award, which went to Medal of Honor: Frontline. During the 6th Annual Interactive Achievement Awards, Suikoden III was nominated for "Console Role-Playing Game of the Year" by the Academy of Interactive Arts & Sciences.

In 2007, IGN awarded Suikoden III the 24th spot on their Top 25 PS2 Games of All Time retrospective list, and later in 2010 it was awarded the 47th spot on IGN's Top 100 PlayStation 2 games.

== Related products ==
The cover to the Suikoden III manga by Aki Shimizu

An 11-volume manga series based on Suikoden III by Aki Shimizu was published by Tokyopop in 2004 in North America. There was also a small amount of merchandising done with the three main characters, who had figurines of them released in the Japan-only Suikoden Figurine collection by Yamato Toys.

Brady Games was commissioned by Konami to write the official U.S. strategy guide for release in the U.S. The guide was co-authored by IGN's Jeremy Dunham and Brady's own Laura Parkinson, but due to undisclosed reasons, it was never published.
