= Suikoden =

Video game series

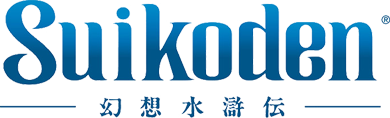
- Genre: Role-playing
- Developers: Konami Computer Entertainment Tokyo (1995–2004); System Sacom (1998); Konami Computer Entertainment Sapporo (1998); Will (2001); Konami (2005–present); Hudson Soft (2006); Mythril (TBA)
- Publisher: Konami
- Creator: Yoshitaka Murayama
- Platforms: PlayStation; Sega Saturn; Windows; PlayStation 2; Game Boy Advance; Nintendo DS; PlayStation Portable; Nintendo Switch; PlayStation 4; PlayStation 5; Xbox One; Xbox Series X/S; Nintendo Switch 2; Android; iOS
- First release: Suikoden; December 15, 1995
- Latest release: Suikoden: Star Leap; August 7, 2026

Suikoden (Japanese: 幻想水滸伝, Hepburn: Gensō Suikoden; lit. "Fantasy Water Margin") is a series of role-playing video games developed and published by Konami. Created by Yoshitaka Murayama, the games are loosely based on the classical Chinese novel Water Margin, whose title is rendered as Suikoden (水滸伝) in Japanese. Each individual game centers on themes of politics, corruption, revolution, mystical crystals known as True Runes, and the "108 Stars of Destiny"—the 108 protagonists who are loosely interpreted from the source material.

Although the events of the games are not chronological, the entire series (except for Tierkreis and Tsumugareshi Hyakunen no Toki) takes place within the same world, among continuing and overlapping histories. In some cases, several characters appear in multiple installments.

A spiritual successor to the series titled Eiyuden Chronicle: Hundred Heroes was released on 23 April 2024. A high-definition remaster of the first two games' port on the PlayStation Portable under the title Suikoden I & II HD Remaster: Gate Rune and Dunan Unification Wars was released on 23 February 2006 and for other platforms on 6 March 2025.

== Games ==
=== Main series ===
Title	Original release date		
Title	Japan	North America	PAL region
Suikoden	December 15, 1995	December 23, 1996	April 11, 1997
Notes: Released on PlayStation; Developed by Konami Computer Entertainment Tokyo; Also available on Sega Saturn, Windows (1998)
Suikoden II	December 17, 1998	September 29, 1999	July 28, 2000
Notes: Released on PlayStation; Developed by Konami Computer Entertainment Tokyo; Also available on Windows (2003)
Suikoden III	July 11, 2002	October 24, 2002	June 23, 2015 (PlayStation Network)
Notes: Released on PlayStation 2; Developed by Konami Computer Entertainment Tokyo
Suikoden IV	August 19, 2004	January 11, 2005	February 25, 2005
Notes: Released on PlayStation 2; Developed by Konami Computer Entertainment Tokyo
Suikoden V	February 23, 2006	March 21, 2006	September 22, 2006
Notes: Released on PlayStation 2; Developed by Konami and Hudson Soft

=== Spin-offs ===
Title	Original release date		
Title	Japan	North America	PAL region
Gensō Suikogaiden Vol. 1 – Swordsman of Harmonia	September 21, 2000	none	none
Notes: Released on PlayStation; Developed by Konami Computer Entertainment Tokyo
Gensō Suikogaiden Vol. 2 – Duel at Crystal Valley	March 22, 2001	none	none
Notes: Released on PlayStation; Developed by Konami Computer Entertainment Tokyo
Gensō Suikoden Card Stories	September 13, 2001	none	none
Notes: Released on Game Boy Advance; Developed by Will
Suikoden Tactics	September 22, 2005	November 8, 2005	February 23, 2006
Notes: Released on PlayStation 2; Developed by Konami
Suikoden Tierkreis	December 18, 2008	March 13, 2009	March 19, 2009
Notes: Released on Nintendo DS; Developed by Konami
Gensō Suikoden: Tsumugareshi Hyakunen no Toki	February 9, 2012	none	none
Notes: Released on PlayStation Portable; Developed by Konami
Suikoden: Star Leap	August 7, 2026	TBA	TBA
Notes: Releasing on iOS, Android and Windows; Developed by Konami and Mythril

=== Compilations ===
Title	Original release date		
Title	Japan	North America	PAL region
Suikoden I & II	February 23, 2006	March 6, 2025 (remaster)	March 6, 2025 (remaster)
Notes: Released on PlayStation Portable; Developed by Konami; Also available on Nintendo Switch, PlayStation 4, PlayStation 5, Windows, Xbox One, Xbox Series X/S, Nintendo Switch 2 (2025)

== Elements ==
=== Gameplay ===
In the Suikoden series, the player takes control of a battle party having a maximum of six people (consisting of the protagonist and 5 other characters), Suikoden IV, however, reduces the party to four fighters and one support. The goal of the game is for the protagonist to defeat the opponents who are trying to oppose his/her team. This becomes possible as every game in the series revolves around the recruitment of the 108 Stars of Destiny; wherein the fighter characters recruited from the bunch can be used as members for the battle party; every game in the series has their respective Stars of Destiny. The series practically makes use of running around towns on different islands and into dungeons filled with monsters or enemies. A base or headquarters will also be obtained by the player which is usually abandoned, monster-infested castles which turns into bustling communities when captured.

==== Battle modes ====
The most typical form of battle in the series is the turn-based battle wherein the 6-man team faces the opponents. However, it is not the sole form of battle featured in the games. There are 3 different types of battle present which recurs and have been accustomed to every game. They are: 'Basic Battle', 'One-on-one Duel' and 'Strategic War Battle'.

1. Basic Battle: It is the most common form of battle. It is when the protagonist's 6-man team will have to battle out. This mode allows the player to control the 6 party members with different commands such as the 'Fight' where the player designates the action he/she wants the characters to perform, 'Run' to escape, 'Bribe' to use the party's money called Potch to bribe the enemy for escape and the 'Auto' command in which the game automatically designates the 'Attack' command for every character.
2. One-on-one Duel: A battle where only a single character fights and happens only in special events. It is a turn-based duel in which the player chooses command to attack (instead of manually controlled fighting). Duels in the series is typically not time-based except Suikoden V wherein choosing a command is timed for 3 seconds. Duels are usually accompanied by dialogue exchange between the player and the enemy, with the dialogue giving clues to what command the enemy will choose next (Essentially rock, paper scissors with the enemy commentary telling the player which they chose).
3. Strategic War Battle: A turn-based strategic battle between the protagonist's side and the enemy. In more accurate terms, this is a battle between armies of the protagonist and the enemy. The protagonist's army is made up of many units which could be organized by the player however he/she desires. Every game in the series has different forms of war battles most notably in Suikoden IV, where the battles are done in the sea. Suikoden V however, is the first game to make use of real-time strategy.

== Development ==
Release timeline
1995	Suikoden
1996
1997
1998	Suikoden II
1999
2000	Gensō Suikogaiden Vol. 1 – Swordsman of Harmonia
2001	Gensō Suikogaiden Vol. 2 – Duel at Crystal Valley
2001	Gensō Suikoden Card Stories
2002	Suikoden III
2003
2004	Suikoden IV
2005	Suikoden Tactics
2006	Suikoden I & II
2006	Suikoden V
2007
2008	Suikoden Tierkreis
2009
2010
2011
2012	Gensō Suikoden: Tsumugareshi Hyakunen no Toki
2013
2014
2015
2016
2017
2018
2019
2020
2021
2022
2023
2024
2025	Suikoden I & II HD Remaster: Gate Rune and Dunan Unification Wars
2026	Suikoden: Star Leap

The Suikoden series was created, written, produced, and overseen by Yoshitaka Murayama, who left Konami near the end of Suikoden III's development. Noritada Matsukawa took over as Senior Director of Suikoden III following Murayama's departure. Suikoden IV was directed by Matsukawa as well but was produced by Junko Kawano, who was the chief designer in Suikoden I. Suikoden V was directed by Takahiro Sakiyama, a relative newcomer to RPGs.

=== Future ===
In an interview conducted by Japanese website 4gamers.net regarding the RPG Frontier Gate, Konami developers revealed that the Suikoden development team had been disbanded with members scattered about teams within Konami and elsewhere. This led to speculation that the franchise had indeed been abandoned following disappointing sales of the latest entries in the series.

Despite these rumours, Konami presented a trailer for a new Suikoden game on Tokyo Game Show 2011: Genso Suikoden: The Woven Web of a Century (Genso Suikoden Tsumugareshi Hyakunen no Toki). It came out in Japan for PSP on February 12, 2012 to generally lackluster reviews.

According to an article published by The Nikkei in 2015, development on the series had been halted.

In 2020, one of Suikoden's development crew left Konami and named a new studio called Rabbit & Bear, founded by some of the key creative minds behind the classic PlayStation-era roleplaying series, including Yoshitaka Murayama, director and writer on the first two Suikoden games, and the creative team also includes Junko Kawano, the lead artist on Suikoden 1 and 4; Junichi Murakami, art director on Castlevania: Aria of Sorrow; Suikoden Tactics director Osamu Komuta; and composers Motoi Sakuraba and Michiko Naruke. Murayama directed a Suikoden spiritual successor titled Eiyuden Chronicle: Hundred Heroes, released in 2024; Murayama died during development.

On March 3rd and 4th, 2025, Konami announced through livestream that they were working with Mythril on a new gacha game spinoff of the franchise called Suikoden: Star Leap that is set chronologically between Suikoden I and V and would be completely canonical to the mainline continuity. The game, along with an anime adaptation of Suikoden II, a stage play adaptation of Suikoden I, and a touring orchestral concert are considered projects of part 2 of the Suikoden revival plan, with all the current and future projects of part 2 specifically focused on expanding the Suikoden fanbase. Suikoden I & II HD Remaster was then retroactively declared part 1 of the plan. A stage play adaptation of Suikoden II has been announced to be running in July of 2027.

== World, setting, and concepts ==
Essentially, each game follows the plot formula of a coup d'état by corrupt power holder(s) and the protagonist is an exile from his/her home. The plot also follows the disastrous misuse of the "True Runes" while the hero struggles, despite overwhelming odds, to bring peace to the land alongside his/her friends, and the climactic showdown with the corrupted True Rune incarnation.

=== The 27 True Runes ===
The 27 True Runes are powerful sources of all magic and primal forces in the world of Suikoden. Wholly sentient and possessing their own will, the True Runes hold immeasurable power, and are the equivalents of gods in the Suikoden world. Many wars have been fought over them in the past, some instigated by the will of the runes themselves. True Runes are often sought by the powerful and influential due to their shared property of granting immortality to those who will bear them. All bearers of True Runes stop aging and become immune to disease and all other natural causes of death, though they can still die from physical trauma such as accidents or murder.

The True Runes often attach themselves to living beings. Doing so gives the True Rune holder great power over the aspect of nature the Rune governs, as well as immortality so long as they bear the Rune. Bearing a True Rune can also have negative consequences, as in the case of the bearer of the Moon Rune being transformed into a vampire. A True Rune can also take the shape of a physical object, as is the case with the Star Dragon Sword being a manifestation of the Night Rune. They can also incarnate themselves unattached from a host, as the Beast Rune did during the Highland-Jowston conflict, self-activating and then feeding of its own will.

Origin of True Runes and the Creation of the Suikoden universe

The story of the creation of the Suikoden universe can be found in books discovered in most games. The story from "Old Book Vol.1" from Suikoden I reads:

In the beginning...there was "Darkness". "Darkness" lived for eons in a rift in time. Suffering in solitude for so long, "Darkness" finally dropped a "Tear". Two brothers were born of "Tear". "Sword" and "Shield". "Sword" said he could cut anything to pieces. "Shield" swore he could protect anything. And so, the two went to battle. The battle lasted seven days and seven nights. "Sword" cut apart "Shield", and "Shield" broke "Sword" into pieces. Fragments of "Sword" fell and became the sky. Fragments of "Shield" fell and became the earth. Sparks from the battle became the stars. The 27 jewels that adorned "Sword" and "Shield" became the "27 True Runes," and the World went into motion.

Identified True Runes

- Gate Rune
- Rune of Life and Death (also known as the Soul Eater)
- Rune of the Beginning
- Rune of Punishment
- True Elemental Runes (Fire, Water, Earth, Wind, and Lightning)
- Sun Rune
- Sovereign Rune
- Hachifusa (Eight-Fold) Rune
- Circle Rune
- Rune of Change
- Moon Rune
- Night Rune
- Beast Rune
- Dragon Rune

=== The 108 Stars of Destiny ===
A concept borrowed from the Chinese novel Shui Hu Zhuan, each Suikoden game has featured 108 characters who band together to ward off a threat. In each main Suikoden game (excluding the Suikogaiden games and Suikoden Tactics), there are 108 notable characters, all of which are recruitable except for in Suikoden III, where several of the stars of destiny were the antagonist characters. While recruiting all of the Stars of Destiny is not a requirement to finishing the game, recruiting all of them gives certain bonuses that affect the story of the game.

=== Geography ===
The Suikoden series is set in a world with many countries. The political geography has changed over the series chronology; while the most recent game in the setting is Suikoden V, chronologically, Suikoden IV is the earliest game while Suikoden III occurs latest within the time span of the series.

Suikoden, Suikoden II and Suikoden III are set on the Northern Continent, a land mass composed of several regions. Suikoden takes place in the Scarlet Moon Empire, which is located on southeastern coast of the Northern Continent, and is composed primarily of the Toran region, with Lake Toran at its centre. Notable locations in this area include Gregminister, the empire's capital situated in Arlus, the Warrior's Village in the Lorimar region, and the Great Forest. At the end of Suikoden, the empire is replaced by the Toran Republic.

Suikoden II is set in the Dunan region, north-west of the Toran Republic, and initially comprises the Highland Kingdom in the east and the Jowston City-States, a confederation of politically autonomous states, in the west. Significant locations in Jowston include the cities-states of South Window, Greenhill, Muse, and Two River, and the Knightdom of Matilda. Following the Dunan Unification War, the Highland Kingdom falls and it, along with the Jowston City-States unite to form the Dunan Republic. The Tinto region lying in the west, separated from Dunan by mountains, chooses to remain politically independent and becomes the Tinto Republic.

Sharing Dunan's western border and north of Tinto are the Grasslands, which stretch from the centre of the Northern Continent to a small portion of the continent's west coast. The area is composed of the six clans: the Lizard, Duck, Karaya, Chisha, Safir, and the Alma Kinan. Directly west of the Grasslands and bordered in the east by Tinto is the Zexen Confederacy, located on the west coast of the Northern Continent and historically an offshoot of the Grasslands. Important locations include the Zexen capital Vinay del Zexay and Budehuc Castle, which lies close to the Grasslands border in northwest Zexen. The primary conflict of Suikoden III occurs in these areas. The northwestern portion of the continent, due north of the Grasslands and Zexen, is the Knightdom of Camaro and the surrounding Nameless Lands.

The largest country in the north is the Holy Kingdom of Harmonia, located in the northeastern portion of the continent. Since its establishment, it has assimilated various neighbouring countries, such as Sanadia, as well as a portion of the Grasslands – the Kanaa clan of the Grasslands became Le Buque under Harmonian rule after the First Fire Bringer War. Notably, the Scarlet Moon Empire originally formed after obtaining political autonomy from Harmonia and taking Harmonia's old capital as its own, renaming it Gregminister, resulting in Harmonia establishing a new capital at the Crystal Valley. Harmonia is also home to the Tower, a location reserved for training and housing members of the Howling Voice Guild.

Other major areas on the Northern Continent include the Kooluk region and Kanakan. The Kooluk region was originally the Kooluk Empire during the course of Suikoden IV and eventually dissolved in Suikoden Tactics to be left as a group of independent settlements. It takes up most of the southern edge of the Northern continent and directly borders the Toran Republic in the east and the Dunan Republic in the north. Off the eastern coast of Toran is the island of Kanakan.

Lying directly south of the Northern Continent is the ocean and several islands, including Obel, Middleport, and Razril. At the end of Suikoden IV, most of these islands are unified to become the Island Nations Federation. The largest island in the area, the Dukedom of Gaien, remains independent. West of Gaien is the island nation of the Kingdom of Zelant.

Due south of the Island Nations is the Southern Continent, a landmass composed primarily of three countries: the Queendom of Falena, and its neighbours, the theocracy of Nagarea in the southwest and the New Armes Kingdom in the southeast. As the setting for Suikoden V, Falena has a large network of rivers and lakes throughout the country and the Ashtwal Mountains in its northern region. Key locations include the cities of Stormfist and Doraat in the west; Rainwall, Estrise, and Sable, located on the Armes border, in the east; Lelcar, Lordlake, and Sauronix in the south; and the Falenan capital, Sol-Falena, and the holy land of Lunas, governed by the Oracle, in the north. Falena has been protected from the militant theocracy Nagarea since the mountain pass between the nations was destroyed, though Armes continues to remain a threat throughout Suikoden V.

Northeast of Falena also appears portion of a landmass of considerable size. West of the Northern and Southern Continents and the Island Nations is a landmass referred to as the Western Continent, of which few details are known. Scattered across the world are mysterious ruins attributed to the lost Sindar race, which is a recurring theme throughout the Suikoden series.

== Music collections ==
The Suikoden games have generally been considered to have soundtracks very well liked by the gaming community, though they have only been released in Japan as of 2007.

A series of arranged soundtracks were released from late 2001–2004. Despite the first being released slightly before Suikoden III and the last at around the same time as Suikoden IV, the music was always taken from music in Suikoden, Suikoden II, Suikoden III, and (rarely) the Suikogaiden side-stories.

- Genso Suikoden Music Collection Produced by Hiroyuki Nanba — a 10-track arrangement released on December 29, 2001. The production and arrangement were both done by Hiroyuki Namba, as the name indicates.
- Genso Suikoden Music Collection Produced by Kentaro Haneda — another 10-track arrangement released on April 24, 2002. Kentarō Haneda was only the producer; the arrangements were done by Kousuke Yamashita, Michiru Oshima, Rie Akagi, Kenji Yamamoto, and Hiroshi Takagi.
- Genso Suikoden Vocal Collection ~La passione commuove la storia~ — a 10-track arrangement released on July 3, 2002. The first piece is an instrumental, but the other tracks all feature vocals. The arrangement was done by Kousuke Yamashita, Hiroshi Takagi, and Megumi Ohashi. Performers included Yuko Imai, Risa Oki, and Yoko Ueno.
- Genso Suikoden Vocal Collection ~Distant Stars, Echoes of Love~ — a 10-track arrangement released on January 22, 2003. The arrangement was once more done by Kousuke Yamashita, Hiroshi Takagi, and Megumi Ohashi. Performers included Sanae Shintani, Yuko Imai, and Tomoko.
- Genso Suikoden Piano Collection ~Avertunerio Antes Lance Mao~ — a 13-track arrangement released on December 18, 2002, arranged by Shusei Murai. Despite the name, these are not piano solos; most include orchestral backup, and some have vocals as well.
- Genso Suikoden Celtic Collection — a 12 track arrangement in the style of celtic music released on March 5, 2003. The arrangements were done by Yoko Ueno, Mina Kubota, Yuko Asai, Shigeyoshi Kawagoe, and "The Rain Book."
- Genso Suikoden Celtic Collection 2 — a 12-track arrangement released on August 20, 2003. Arrangement was done by Yoko Ueno, Yuji Yoshino, Yuko Asai, and Shigeyoshi Kawagoe.
- Genso Suikoden Music Collection ~Asian Collection~ — a 12-track arrangement released on November 27, 2003. It was arranged by Kiyoshi Yoshida, Hidenori Maezawa, Yuko Asai, and Shigeyoshi Kawagoe.
- Genso Suikoden Piano Collection 2 — a 12 track arrangement released on January 21, 2004, arranged by Shusei Murai.
- Genso Suikoden Celtic Collection III — a 13 track arrangement released on April 14, 2004, arranged by Yuji Yoshino.

== Publications, adaptations, and other material ==
Many publications, such as the Suikoden World Guide and Suikoden Encyclopedia, exist for the Suikoden series, though the majority are only in Japanese. Suikoden and Suikoden II have light novel adaptations written by Shinjiro Hori released only in Japan. Suikoden III was adapted into a manga by Aki Shimizu, which was released in English markets by Tokyopop. A manga based on tie-in for Suikoden: Star Leap, subtitled Trails of the Stars, began publication on November 5, 2025. An anime adaptation of Suikoden II titled Suikoden: The Anime, produced by Konami Animation with NBCUniversal Entertainment Japan handling general production, was announced on March 4, 2025 and began airing on October 3, 2026. A stage play adaptation of Suikoden I, titled Suikoden: The Gate Rune War Arc, and a touring orchestral concert, which both ran in December 2025 for the game's 30th anniversary, were also announced at the same time.

== Cameos ==
- Tokimeki Memorial: Forever with You (1995) (PlayStation, Sega Saturn, PlayStation Portable)
- Mitsumete Knight R (1998) (PlayStation), the protagonist of Suikoden I is one of the characters in this game.
- Konami Wai Wai Sokoban (2006) (mobile phones), the protagonist of Suikoden I is one of the selectable characters in this game.
- Professional Yakyuu Spirits A (2015) (mobile phones), Tir appear as supportive character.
- Super Bomberman R Online (2021), Riou from Suikoden II features as a playable character.
- Astro Bot (2024), a VIP bot known as the First Star can be rescued in the game, designed with the clothing and Bō-staff belonging to the protagonist of Suikoden I, as well as featuring the Rune of Life and Death if the First Star is interacted with.
