= Suikoden II =

1998 video game

- Developer: Konami Computer Entertainment Tokyo
- Publisher: Konami
- Director: Yoshitaka Murayama
- Producer: Yoshitaka Murayama
- Designers: Fumi Ishikawa; Junko Kawano
- Artist: Fumi Ishikawa
- Writers: Yoshitaka Murayama; Junko Kawano
- Composers: Miki Higashino; Keiko Fukami
- Series: Suikoden
- Platforms: PlayStation; Windows
- Release: PlayStation: JP: December 17, 1998; NA: September 29, 1999; EU: July 28, 2000; Windows: CHN: 2003
- Genre: Role-playing
- Mode: Single-player

Suikoden II (Japanese: 幻想水滸伝II, Hepburn: Gensō Suikoden Tsū;) is a role-playing video game developed and published by Konami for the PlayStation video game console and the second installment of the Suikoden video game series. It was released on December 17, 1998, in Japan; on September 29, 1999, in North America; and on July 28, 2000, in Europe. The game features a vast array of characters, with over 100 recruitable characters, of which over 40 are usable in combat.

Suikoden II takes place three years after the events of the original Suikoden. In the northern neighboring countries of the newly established Toran Republic (previously Scarlet Moon Empire) by President Lepant, the new protagonist are caught in a devastating war between City-States of Jowston led by Mayor Anabelle and Kingdom of Highland led by Prince Luca Blight. The player is also adopted son of Genkaku, a hero who saved the City-States of Jowston in a war against Highland years ago. The Genkaku Jr. and his best friend, Jowy Atreides, each gain one half of the Rune of the Beginning, one of the 27 True Runes of the Suikoden setting, and become caught up in the intrigues of the invasion and the dark fate of those who bear the halves of that Rune. As with other Suikoden titles, the game also centers on the recruitment of the 108 Stars of Destiny.

Suikoden II was initially released to lackluster sales and somewhat tepid critical reception, with some criticism (and lack of widespread appeal) being directed at the game's simpler and more retro 16-bit sprite visuals at a time when 3D graphics were heavily emphasized across the video game industry in the late-1990s. Since then, it in retrospect has become a cult classic of the role-playing genre and regarded one of the greatest video games ever made.

A compilation of the first two Suikoden games, Suikoden I & II, was released for PlayStation Portable in Japan on February 23, 2006. A high-definition English localization version of the compilation under the title Suikoden I & II HD Remaster: Gate Rune and Dunan Unification Wars released worldwide on March 6, 2025, for Nintendo Switch, PlayStation 4, PlayStation 5, Windows, Xbox One and Xbox Series X/S. An anime television series adaptation produced by Konami Animation premiered in October 2026.

== Gameplay ==
Suikoden II is a role-playing video game with strategic elements, with multiple gameplay formats ranging from one-on-one combat to large scale confrontations between two armies. The player controls a silent protagonist, advancing the plot by completing tasks and talking with other characters. The player can also recruit over 100 new characters to his cause, often involving a short sidequest to do so. In towns, the player can gather information, sharpen characters' weaponry, and buy equipment and runes; wilderness areas generally feature random encounters with monsters.

Like other games of the series, Suikoden II employs a unique character leveling system from most RPGs. There is a fixed number of experience points needed to gain each level, and experience gained after battles is determined by the difference in levels between the party members and enemies. This allows for low-level characters to catch up to the levels of enemies at later points in the game quickly, reducing the need for level grinding.

Runes, the source of all magic in the world of Suikoden II, are handled the same as the original Suikoden. Characters have a certain number of spell usages per "spell level"; for instance, a character with four level 1 spell slots and a Fire Rune could cast "Flaming Arrows" (the level 1 Fire Rune spell) four times. Some specialized runes or skill-based runes have different rules, such as unlimited use or a single use per battle.

Updates from the original Suikoden include a grid and unit based tactical battle system, the addition of a three rune slot system which allows for three different runes to be equipped at once, a party inventory system, a "dash" button that allowed the player to move around the screen quicker, and vast graphical improvement. Also notable is the inclusion of a variety of mini-games including one quite reminiscent of Iron Chef. A transfer of data from the prior game in the series enables returning characters to enter the fray with higher levels and improved weapons. References to the original Suikoden are also adapted accordingly for a greater feel in continuity.

Following the original Suikoden, Suikoden II contains three different types of combat:

- Regular battles: Where the majority of combat takes place in the game, the turn-based battle system in Suikoden II is considered typical of JRPGs at the time, containing options for attack, magic (runes), items etc. The player can enter battles through random encounters on the world map and dungeons, or at specific points of the plot. The player may have a party of up to 6 characters in this battle type, against up to 6 enemies. If all six characters lose all their hit points and are thus incapacitated, it is game over and the player must restart (exceptions exist for certain plot battles in which winning is optional). This is the only type of combat where the player can gain experience, items or Potch (the currency of Suikoden II). Emphasis is placed on "unite attacks," unique combination attacks between specific characters in the party. These special attacks exhibit a wide variety of abilities and usually highlight the personality traits and relationships of the characters.
- Duels: The main character is pitted against another character in single combat. This style of fighting only has three moves: Attack, Wild Attack, and Defend. This duel is played in a Rock, Paper, Scissors style where "Attack" beats "Defend", "Wild Attack" beats "Attack", and "Defend" beats "Wild Attack". The player must attempt to guess what kind of attack the enemy is going to perform by the dialogue displayed on-screen before each round.
- Massive battles: More interactivity was added to this element of the gameplay over that of its predecessor. While some of the shades of the old "Rock, Paper, Scissors" style battle of the original (where cavalry beats archers, archers beat magic and magic beats cavalry) remain, Suikoden II introduces a grid style battle system reminiscent to that of the Romance of the Three Kingdoms or Fire Emblem games. As the main character recruits characters for his castle, this opens up more options for more units. Certain characters are 'unit leaders' while others are 'supports'. Every character adds a certain amount of defense or attack to a unit. In addition, certain characters also add special abilities to the unit to which they have been attached. The numbers affect the chances of win or loss as much as the type of units being pitted against each other. Every unit may take up to a total of two 'losses' which are counted when a unit suffers a severe number of casualties. Each skirmish they take part in might result in no loss, loss on one side, or even loss on both sides. As mentioned before, certain characters add special abilities to the units. Examples of these abilities include being able to take more losses than usual, magic or archery to allow attacks from a distance, healing of itself or others, etc. When a unit suffers its maximum losses it will retreat from battle and, when this happens there is a possibility of the characters in the unit being wounded or even killed. Should a character be killed in a massive battle, they are considered permanently dead.

Dialogue between characters in Suikoden 2 is an important part of gameplay.

== Story ==
=== Characters ===
The story of Suikoden II centers around the protagonist, Riou Genkaku (canon name; although other name can also be chosen by the player), his childhood best friend Jowy Atreides, and his adopted big sister Nanami. The story revolves around Riou and Jowy each acquiring one half of the Rune of the Beginning, one of the 27 True Runes that each govern an aspect of the Suikoden universe and are the source of all magical powers. The Rune, whose name references the creation myth of the Suikoden universe, governs conflict and war, and steers the destinies of Riou and Jowy so they must fight each other until one is defeated and the two halves are reunited. Their fated conflict causes much pain for Nanami, who wishes for the three friends to run away and live a quiet and happy life together.

The main conflict of the story centers on a war between the nations of Highland and the City-States of Jowston. The antagonist for the majority of the game is Prince Luca Blight, heir to the throne of Highland. Luca is a brutal and bloodthirsty madman who developed a strong hatred for Jowston at a young age after witnessing his mother's rape by Jowstonian soldiers during an earlier war. Other antagonists include Neclord, a senile vampire who uses another of the True Runes to fulfill his lust and sadistic tendencies; Gordeau, the brutal leader of an order of knights; Leon Silverberg, a mysterious strategist working for his own endslast surviving relative of Mathiu and the fallen rebel leader Odessa from the first Suikoden; and the Beast Rune, driven by its instinct to seek Luca, so both can combine their power together to become even stronger.

As with all Suikoden games, the principal cast of the game is the 108 Stars of Destiny, who play important or minor roles in the plot of the game. Important characters include Shu, student of Mathiu who becomes Riou's main strategist; Eilie, Riou's main romantic interest; Teresa, a steadfast woman acting as a mayor in her father's place; Kiba, a Highland general who defects after Riou defeats him; Chaco, an impertinent young member of a race of flying humanoids; and Apple, another Mathiu disciple that secretly have romantic feelings for Shu and one of Riou's logistic tactician.

Some prominent Stars of Destiny from the original Suikoden appear in Suikoden II and play key roles in the game, including Viktor, McDohl and Flik. If the player loads save data from the original Suikoden at the beginning of the game, the protagonist from the previous game can be recruited.

=== Plot ===
The game begins with Riou and Jowy waking up from their sleep; they are members of the Unicorn Youth Brigade of the Highland army. On the same night, the maniacal Prince Luca Blight orchestrates a false flag attack on the brigade, blaming the Jowstonians and giving the excuse to justify an incursion deep into Jowston territory after a recent peace treaty. After witnessing the slaughter of their fellow youth soldiers, Riou and Jowy have no choice but to escape by jumping from a cliff into a river, while promising to return to a marked spot they made if they ever get separated.

Riou is rescued from the river by a group of mercenaries working for Jowston, led by Viktor and Flik from the first Suikoden game. Riou is detained as an enemy soldier of Highland. Jowy is rescued and nursed back to health by the keepers of a mysterious shrine in nearby Toto Village. Learning of Riou's imprisonment, Jowy rescues Riou, and the two escape back to their hometown in Highland. After reuniting with Riou's adoptive sister Nanami, they are captured and sentenced to death by the Highland army to silence the truth of the youth brigade massacre. They are once again saved by Viktor and Flik and were taken back to Jowston. Apple, a former disciple of Mathiu the strategist, joins them to prepare for the inevitable war.

Soon after, Blight and the Highland army begun their invasion of Jowston and the mercenaries prove no match against them and are forced to flee. As Luca razes the region, Riou and Jowy passed the now-destroyed Toto Village during their escape and discover that the village's shrine is the resting place of the Rune of the Beginning. Riou's adoptive grandfather, Genkaku, had shared the rune 25 years ago with his best friend, and Highland champion, Han Cunningham. The two tried to reunite the rune, but failed due to the animosity between their respective nations, and were forced to seal it in the shrine instead. Inside the shrine, each of them receives half of the Rune, with Riou gaining the Bright Shield Rune and Jowy gaining the Black Sword Rune.

The ragtag group flees onward to Muse, capital of the City-States of Jowston, where Riou and Jowy are inadvertently asked to participate in a spy mission to the Highland army camp. During the mission, Jowy is captured by the enemy. He is able to escape back to Muse but begins to act strangely. The individual leaders of the Jowston Alliance were divided in how to respond to the Highland invasion. As the Highland army approaches, Jowy betrays the group, assassinates Anabelle, the mayor of Muse, and opens the city gates to let the Highland army in. Riou and Nanami, distraught over Jowy's betrayal, flee south across Lake Dunan with the surviving members of Viktor's mercenaries.

Regrouping in South Window, the group were tasked to drive the vampire Neclord out of Victor's ruined hometown of North Window. Neclord escapes and South Window fell to Highland soon after. The group then uses Neclord's old hideout in North Window as a new base to build their forces against Highland. Apple helps them recruit a brilliant merchant named Shu, as their chief strategist; another former disciple of Mathiu. Leknaat, the mage and the Gate Rune bearer from the original Suikoden who oversees fate, tells Riou that he has been chosen to gather the 108 Stars of Destiny. Riou and the recruited Stars of Destiny work to rally the remaining City-States under the banner of the New State Army. He rescued Teresa, acting leader of Greenhill from a Highland takeover by Jowy, and formed alliances with Two River and the Toran Republic (the setting of the first game). Gordeau, leader of the Knightdom of Matilda, refuses to join the alliance, but many of the knights under his command defect to Riou's cause.

After capturing Greenhill without a battle, Jowy rises through the ranks of the Highland army, marrying Luca's sister Princess Jillia and plotting with Luca to assassinate the King of Highland, Agares Blight. However, Jowy reveals that his support for Luca is a ruse, that he believes Luca's insanity and cruelty are a threat to both Highland and Jowston, and he intends to betray Luca to create his own nation after building his own base of support. After poisoning his father and becoming King of Highland, Luca launches an attack against the New State Army. Jowy uses the pending attack to betray Luca by warning the New State Army and giving Riou information on Luca's whereabouts. Riou and the New State Army ambush Luca and kill him after a lengthy struggle. Jowy then becomes king of Highland through his marriage to Jillia. Unfortunately, even with Luca dead, Jowy is still unwilling to make peace, believing that distrust and antagonism will always exist as long as Highland and Jowston exists.

Riou defeats Neclord once more to free the state of Tinto, then liberates Greenhill. However, the Matilda Knightdom has formed an uneasy truce with Highland, becoming their puppet state. While Riou besieges Matilda to sever their alliance with Highland, Nanami is gravely wounded in a treacherous attack by Gordeau. Riou and Jowy briefly reunite to take Gordeau down. Despite the best efforts of the New State Army's doctor, Nanami appears to succumb to her wounds. Riou shakes off his grief and leads his completed alliance to attack the Highland capital city of L'Renouille, where he duels and defeats Han Cunningham; before dying, Han expresses the hope that Riou and Jowy can succeed where he and Genkaku failed.

Realizing he has lost, Jowy tells Jillia and their adopted daughter Pilika to flee the kingdom. Meanwhile, Leon Silverberg informs Riou that Jowy had been using his Black Sword Rune to suppress the power of the Beast Rune, another of the 27 True Runes that governs animalistic rage, passion, and blood sacrifice. Luca's earlier sacrifice of the people of Muse had filled the Beast Rune with power, and Leon remained with Highland while he sought a way to destroy it. Leon activates the Beast Rune with his own blood, and Riou and his allies defeat it for good.

From this point, the game diverges into several potential endings. After Riou returns to his headquarters, Shu asks him to become the leader of the newly allied city-states. If the player accepts, the story ends. Alternately, the player can refuse, and have Riou keep his promise to reunite with Jowy at the rock from the beginning of the game. Jowy challenges Riou to a final duel, realizing that the split Rune of Beginning will slowly kill them both unless one of them dies. Riou can kill Jowy in the duel, or refuse to fight, whereupon Jowy sacrifices his life to heal Riou and reunite the Rune of Beginning.

If the player recruits all 108 Stars of Destiny and fulfills certain other requirements, Leknaat appears to halt Riou and Jowy's duel, and informs Riou that his refusal to kill Jowy has resolved the conflict within the Rune. As Riou and Jowy journey down the mountain, they are met by Shu, who informs them that Nanami survived her wounds after all—she asked Shu to help her fake her death so Riou could focus on ending the war without her grieving at seeing him and Jowy fighting. The three friends joyfully reunite at Genkaku's dojo and leave to travel the world together.

== Development and release ==
In the winter of 1993/1994, Konami newcomers Yoshitaka Murayama and Junko Kawano were tasked with creating an RPG for an internally developed video games console. This game was scrapped in the early stages of development and despite the popular belief was not the basis for the script of Suikoden. Murayama, Kawano and ten other employees were instead assigned with developing Konami's first games for Sony's upcoming console, the PlayStation. With the pick of making a baseball game, a racing game or an RPG, Murayama and Kawano decided to reopen their RPG project, although Murayama has stated that given the opportunity, he would have preferred to make a shoot 'em up, citing his preference for arcade action titles such as Taito's Metal Black. Committed from the start to make a franchise to rival series such as Enix's Dragon Quest and Square's Final Fantasy, Murayama wrote the scenario of the first Suikoden. With the success of the first game a sequel gained a green-light. After reading fan letters Murayama decided that the selling point of the first game was its story, and thus it became the main focus of the second title. The story for Suikoden 2 was conceived after Suikoden 1 and was mostly written by Murayama himself. Suikoden II was made available for download on the PlayStation Network on December 9, 2014.

== Reception ==
Reception

Aggregate score
Aggregator	Score
Metacritic	82/100

Review scores
Publication	Score
Electronic Gaming Monthly	7/10
Game Informer	9/10
GameSpot	7.6/10
IGN	9/10
Next Generation	4/5
Official U.S. PlayStation Magazine	4/5
PlayStation: The Official Magazine	4.5/5

Suikoden II was commercially successful in Japan. In the West, the game saw a limited print run, and the lackluster initial response prevented a reprinting of the game. Despite this, the game received "favorable" reviews according to the review aggregation website Metacritic. Francesca Reyes of Next Generation called it "One of the best RPGs to hit PlayStation this year."

Since the 2010s, reanalysis of the game is often met with critical praise, and many video game critics and players alike consider it to be one of the best Konami games as well as one of the best console RPGs from outside of the Square Enix canon, and the best of all Suikoden games.

== Other media ==
- Suikoden II

幻想水滸伝II (Gensō Suikoden Tsū)
- Created by: Konami Digital Entertainment
- Manga

Suikoden: The Anime: Honmono no Eiyū
- Written by: Konami
- Illustrated by: Kochiya
- Published by: ASCII Media Works
- Magazine: Comic Dengeki Daioh "g"
- Original run: July 27, 2026 – present
- Anime television series

Suikoden: The Anime
- Directed by: Yūzō Satō
- Written by: Michihiro Tsuchiya
- Music by: Kōji Nakamura
- Studio: Konami Animation
- Licensed by: Crunchyroll: SEA: Medialink
- Original network: Tokyo MX, Kansai TV, BS Asahi, HTB, ABA, mit, tbc, AAB, YBC, FTV, GYT, GTV, NST, KNB, Ishikawa TV, FTB, YBS, NBS, SBS, Nagoya TV, TSK, RNC, Hiroshima TV, KRY, JRT, RNB, TNC, KTN, RKK, OBS, KTS
- Original run: October 3, 2026 – present
- Episodes: 6

=== Manga ===
A manga adaptation of the original game and its anime adaptation, titled Suikoden: The Anime: Honmono no Eiyū (幻想水滸伝 The Anime 〜本物の英雄〜; lit. 'Suikoden: The Anime: The True Hero') and illustrated by Kochiya, began serialization in ASCII Media Works' Comic Dengeki Daioh "g" magazine on July 27, 2026.

=== Anime ===
An anime television series adaptation of Suikoden II, titled Suikoden: The Anime, was announced during a livestream for the game franchise on March 4, 2025. The series is produced by Konami Animation and directed by Yūzō Satō, with Ryō Hino from NBCUniversal Entertainment Japan serving as the production manager, Michihiro Tsuchiya handling series composition, and Kōji Nakamura is composing the music. It premiered on October 3, 2026, on Tokyo MX and other networks. The opening theme song is "Kanashimi Sae Otonabite" (悲しみさえ大人びて; 'Even in Sadness I'll Look Like an Adult') performed by Amazarashi, and the ending theme song is "closed eye sun" performed by Koji Nakamura featuring Honoka Takahashi. Beginning October 6, 2026, the show has been streamed on YouTube via its official YouTube channel. Beginning on November 10, 2026, Crunchyroll is also streaming the series. Medialink licensed the series in Southeast Asia.

=== Stage play ===
A stage play adaptation of Suikoden II was announced on September 21, 2026. It will be directed by Norihito Nakayashiki and will run in Tokyo and Osaka in July 2027.

== See also ==
- List of video games considered the best
