= Suikoden (video game) =

1995 video game

- Developers: Konami Computer Entertainment Tokyo (PS); System Sacom (PC); Konami Computer Entertainment Sapporo (Saturn)
- Publisher: Konami
- Director: Yoshitaka Murayama
- Producer: Kazumi Kitaue
- Designer: Junko Kawano
- Artist: Junko Kawano
- Composers: Miki Higashino; Tappy Iwase; Hiroshi Tamawari; Hirofumi Taniguchi; Mayuko Kageshita
- Series: Suikoden
- Platforms: PlayStation; Windows; Sega Saturn
- Release: PlayStation: JP: December 15, 1995; NA: December 23, 1996; EU: April 11, 1997; Windows: JP: March 26, 1998; Sega Saturn: JP: September 17, 1998
- Genre: Role-playing
- Mode: Single-player

Suikoden (Japanese: 幻想水滸伝, Hepburn: Gensō Suikoden;) is a role-playing video game published by Konami. It is the first installment of the Suikoden series. Developed by Konami Computer Entertainment Tokyo, it was released initially in 1995 for the PlayStation in Japan. A North American release followed one year later, and a mainland European release came the following April. The game was also released for Windows and Sega Saturn in 1998, but only in Japan.

The game centers on the political struggles of the Scarlet Moon Empire. The player controls a Scarlet Moon Empire general's son, who is destined to seek out 108 warriors (referred to as the 108 Stars of Destiny) in order to revolt against the corrupt sovereign state and bring peace to a war-torn land. The game is loosely based on the Chinese novel Water Margin, and features a vast array of characters both controllable and not, with over ninety characters usable in combat and many more able to help or hinder the hero in a variety of ways.

A compilation of the first two Suikoden games, Suikoden I & II, was released for PlayStation Portable in Japan on February 23, 2006. A high-definition English localization version of the compilation under the title Suikoden I & II HD Remaster: Gate Rune and Dunan Unification Wars released worldwide on March 6, 2025 for Nintendo Switch, PlayStation 4, PlayStation 5, Windows, Xbox One and Xbox Series X/S.

== Gameplay ==
Suikoden plays like a traditional role-playing video game, with the player moving characters across a landscape, advancing the plot by completing tasks and talking with other characters. It has been compared to Beyond the Beyond and, more rarely, Final Fantasy VII.

The Hero may recruit up to 107 new characters to his cause, although not all recruited characters are playable characters, and the battle system in Suikoden features six person parties in combat, with each character being individually controllable, with an option to allow the characters to fight automatically. Some characters can only be recruited if the party has reached a certain experience level or found a special item.

Combat triggers through random encounters and is turn-based. Both the player-controlled party members and the computer-controlled enemy combatants select their actions before the turn commences. Characters carry out their actions in the order of their speed.

A variety of statistics determine in-game combat ability, including optimum weapon range. Weapon range requires the player to think about character placement in the standard battle formation. There are three ranges from which a character can have the ability to attack: Short, Medium and Long. Short range characters are typically swordsmen who have to be placed at the front row of the six party formation, while Medium range attacks can fight from either the front or the back row, meanwhile Long range attackers can attack from both ranges but benefit more so from fighting in the back row, usually due to either their low hit point total, their low physical defence, or both. They also benefit from being able to attack either the enemy's front row or back row in combat. If all six characters lose all their hit points and are thus incapacitated, it is game over and the player must restart from a save point. Exceptions exist for certain plot battles in which winning is optional; the player can lose and the plot continues on, albeit in a slightly different fashion.

A battle scene from Suikoden

Two other types of battle systems exist: duel battles and war battles. Both duel battles and strategic war battles are analogous to Rock, Paper, Scissors. In one-on-one duels, there are three commands: attack, defend and special. Attack beats defend, defend beats special and special beats attack. The player is given hints on the best course of action as the dueling opponent will often telegraph their intentions. In strategic war battles, the four major groups are charge attacks, bow attacks, magic attacks and others. Charge attacks beat bow attacks, bow attacks beat magic attacks and magic attacks beat charge attacks. The 'other' command acts as a free special command enabling the player to, for example, learn what the enemy's next attack will be.

Weapons are unique to each character and require sharpening in towns that have blacksmiths. There are no weapon shops in Suikoden and equipment shopping is limited to armour and items. However, because of the need to sharpen a minimum of six characters' weapons at any one time, this can be a more expensive process than in a typical RPG. Information gathering and character recruiting is also a commonplace occurrence within towns. Wilderness areas such as the world map or dungeons generally feature random encounters with monsters that do not increase in difficulty as the player's party advances in level, and the amount of experience characters gain is based on their level (a low-level character will receive more experience than a high level character, even in the same battle).

Runes are the source of all magic in the world of Suikoden. Characters have a certain number of spell usages per "spell level;" governed generally by their magic statistic. For instance, a character with four level 1 spell slots and a Water Rune could cast "Kindness Drops" (the level 1 Water Rune spell) four times. Other runes offer different benefits such as allowing a character to deal double damage at the cost of a 50% reduction in defence. Most runes can only be used in a limited capacity.

== Plot ==
The Hero (nameable by the player, though known as "Tir" in official material) is the son of a Great General of the Scarlet Moon Empire, Teo McDohl. Teo is called away to fight a battle in the northlands, leaving his son alone under the guardianship of several family friends: long-time friend Ted and servants Cleo, Pahn and Gremio. Together, they accompany the hero to begin his career in the Imperial Army. He soon comes to realize through his missions and association with his leaders that the corruption within the Empire's top tier has led to a country whose population is trapped into labor and depressed.

Through Ted, who is left hurt by a top servant of the king's, he comes into possession of the Rune of Life and Death (also known as the Soul Eater), one of 27 True Runes that govern various aspects of the world. Because the Rune is ruthlessly hunted for by corrupt officials within the Empire and their manipulators, the Hero and his companions are forced to flee the capital city of Gregminster with the help of Viktor, a suspicious character with unknown intentions. Unable to move properly, Ted stays behind to delay the enemy. Pahn, unsure of where his loyalty lies, decided to side with the Empire.

After escaping, Viktor reveals he is part of the ongoing rebellion determined to face the corrupt Empire. Taking a liking to The Hero, he enlists him into the organization with the approval of their leader, Odessa Silverberg and reluctance of other members, particularly warrior Flik. In his short time there, the hero is only convinced of the need to struggle against the Empire when the hideout is attacked and sacked by Imperial forces, who kill Odessa after she tries to protect an innocent child. Recruiting the help of Odessa's brother, former imperial strategist Mathiu Silverberg, the Hero becomes the new Liberation Army leader. After securing an abandoned castle as its headquarters (nameable by the player), the army starts off as a small force working to unite rebel factions throughout Scarlet Moon, and eventually becomes a force large and powerful enough to bring down the Empire itself and evil lurking from inside it.

== Characters ==
Suikoden has over 108 allied characters and numerous enemies and neutral characters. Many of the characters in this game also appear in later games in the Suikoden franchise.Characters include Tir McDohl (canonical, but referred to as Tir,) Gremio, Pahn, Cleo, Yuber, Viki, Viktor, Flik, Kraze, Barbarossa, Teo McDohl, Futch, Ted, Odessa, Mathiu, Luc, Kasumi, Leknaat, Jeane, Windy, Valeria, Ain Gide, Apple, Kanaan, Lepant, Mina, Neclord, Pesmerga, Sarah, Sheena, Varkas, Sydonia, Tai Ho, Camille, Hix, Tengaar, Gwen, Hudai, and Wakaba.

== Development ==
Suikoden took roughly two years to develop. Scenario Writer Yoshitaka Murayama cites inspiration for the story and setting from the novels Romance of the Three Kingdoms and The Eternal Champion.

== Audio ==
The soundtrack was published by King Records and released in Japan on April 5, 1996. It was composed and arranged by Miki Higashino, Tappi Iwase (Tappy), Taniguchi Hirofumi, Mayuko Kageshita and Hiroshi Tamawari. The soundtrack contained 2 discs and a total of 48 tracks.

== Release ==
Suikoden was released for the PlayStation in Japan on December 15, 1995.

The Saturn version was released nearly three years after the PlayStation original. It is an enhanced port including new locations, new enemies, enhanced colors, and a new opening full motion video.

== Reception ==
Reception

Aggregate score
Aggregator	Score
GameRankings	82%

Review scores
Publication	Score
AllGame	4.5/5
Computer and Video Games	3/5
Electronic Gaming Monthly	8.5/10, 9/10, 9/10, 8.5/10
Famitsu	7/10, 8/10, 6/10, 5/10
Game Informer	7.75 of 10
GameFan	277/300 (Japan); 281/300 (US)
GameRevolution	A−
GameSpot	6.5/10
IGN	9/10
Next Generation	4/5
PlayStation Official Magazine – UK	9/10
RPGamer	7 of 10
RPGFan	90%
Dengeki PlayStation	90/100, 85/100, 85/100, 85/100

Awards
Publication	Award
5th Annual GameFan Megawards (1996)	RPG Game of the Year, Best Game Story of the Year, Best Soundtrack of the Year
Game Informer	82nd Best Game Of All Time

At the time of its release, Suikoden received mostly positive reviews. It has averaged a score of 82% on GameRankings culled from 14 reviews. Art Angel of GamePro deemed it "a superlative RPG experience. What separates Suikoden from other RPGs are a great story line, sensational sounds, and a user-friendly interface." He elaborated that the many subplots "neatly tie up the final denouement", the soundtrack captures the feeling behind each situation and setting, and the clearly laid-out inventories eliminate any unnecessary effort in playing the game. He identified the graphics as his one point of criticism, citing the pixelization when the game zooms and the absence of full motion video. A reviewer for Next Generation called it "one of the most addictive RPGs to come along." He particularly praised the look of the combat engine, the strategic elements of the war battles, and the lack of a resurrection mechanic. He described the story as "stock RPG" but said it was enough to keep the player motivated. The four reviewers of Electronic Gaming Monthly were enthusiastic about the lengthy storyline, massive lineup of playable characters, different combat systems, and soundtrack. They described it as the most ambitious PlayStation RPG to date, while noting that it was soon to be eclipsed by Final Fantasy VII. IGN claimed the game was "one of the best RPGs ever made", stating that although its story is simple, the background visuals and music are beautiful and fantastic, and it never becomes boring. Jeff Gerstmann stated in GameSpot that, although not ground-breaking, it was a good game, if short and easy. He considered the game as a "warm-up" for upcoming RPGs such as Wild Arms or Final Fantasy VII. Game Revolution gave the game an A−, quoting in particular its astonishing musical scores.

Electronic Gaming Monthly named Suikoden a runner-up for Role-Playing Game of the Year. Though the award went to Blood Omen: Legacy of Kain, they noted it had been a close race between the two games. During the inaugural Interactive Achievement Awards, the Academy of Interactive Arts & Sciences nominated Suikoden for "Console Game of the Year" and "Console Role-Playing Game of the Year".

In a retrospective review, RPGamer stated that the game was original, breaking out from the typical "Mysterious stranger saves the world" story-line, and also pointed out that it was a relatively simple game suited generally for "novices" and for "die-hard fans" of the series who hadn't played it yet and rated it a 7. Peter Tieryas of Kotaku described the narrative as telling "a sweeping tale about justice, corruption, and humanity in a way few games have." Game Informer ranked it the 82nd best game ever made in its 100th issue in 2001. They felt that its originality made up for lower-than-average graphics and standard gameplay.

== Legacy ==
Suikoden began the Suikoden franchise, which includes video games, light novels, and manga. Its direct sequel was Suikoden II, which first released in 1998.

Game designer Warren Spector listed Suikoden as his sixth favorite video game of all time. He credited it as an inspiration on his work, particularly the Deus Ex series as well as Epic Mickey. He said the limited choices in Suikoden inspired him to expand on the idea with more meaningful choices, with the development of Deus Ex.

A stage play adaptation of Suikoden was announced during a livestream for the game franchise on March 4, 2025. It was directed by Norihito Nakayashiki and ran in Tokyo and Kyoto in December 2025.
