= Suikoden IV =

2004 video game

- Developer: Konami Computer Entertainment Tokyo
- Publisher: Konami
- Director: Masayuki Saruta
- Producer: Junko Kawano
- Artist: Junko Kawano
- Writer: Junko Kawano
- Composers: Masahiko Kimura; Michiru Yamane; Norikazu Miura
- Series: Suikoden
- Platform: PlayStation 2
- Release: JP: August 19, 2004; NA: January 11, 2005; EU: February 25, 2005
- Genre: Role-playing
- Mode: Single-player

Suikoden IV (Japanese: 幻想水滸伝IV, Hepburn: Gensō Suikoden Fō;) is a role-playing video game developed by Konami Computer Entertainment Tokyo and published by Konami exclusively for the PlayStation 2 video game console and is the fourth installment of the Suikoden video game series. It was released in August 2004 in Japan, and early 2005 in North America and Europe.

Suikoden IV takes place approximately 150 years before the events of the first Suikoden game, and relates the story of a young boy living on the island of Razril and the Rune of Punishment, one of the 27 True Runes. The Rune of Punishment governs both atonement and forgiveness, and is unusual in that it consumes the life of the bearer with use; once the previous bearer dies, it immediately jumps to someone nearby. Meanwhile, the Kooluk Empire seeks to expand into the nearby Island Nations.

Konami later produced Suikoden Tactics, a spinoff that serves as a direct prequel, side-story, and sequel to Suikoden IV.

== Story ==
Suikoden IV begins its tale with a training session where the Hero and his best friend Snowe Vingerhut face off against their Commander and Vice Commander, Glen and Katarina Cott respectively, out at sea. After the training concludes, the Hero and his fellow knight trainees head home to Razril, where they are to be pronounced full-fledged Gaien knights.

After the ceremonial Kindling Ritual and a night of feasting, the Hero awakens the next morning for his first duties as a new knight, including the task of escorting a man named Ramada to the neighboring island of Iluya. During the trip there, they are attacked by Brandeau and his pirates. Snowe abandons the ship after being fired upon by "rune cannons," while the Hero decides to brave the attacks and stay, thus inspiring jealousy in his cowardly comrade. Brandeau then boards the Hero's ship and challenges him to a duel, which the young knight unexpectedly wins. As a last effort, Brandeau unleashes the power of the Rune of Punishment and attempts to destroy everyone, but a mysterious force shields the Hero from its might. Glen arrives to save his men, and in that brief moment, the Rune of Punishment is passed from Brandeau to Glen, after which Brandeau evaporates into dust.

Soon after, the knights retreat back to Razril. Several enemy fleets attack in succession, finally forcing Glen to repel them with the power of the deadly Rune. In the aftermath, the Hero finds the Commander dying, and unwittingly becomes the Rune of Punishment's next bearer. Snowe arrives just in time to witness Glen's evaporation and blames the Hero for killing him. Katarina, who assumes command in Glen's stead, believes Snowe's story and sentences the Hero to exile from the island. Drifting aimlessly on a small boat, the Hero discovers that two of his fellow knights, as well as a wandering merchant, have stowed away to join him.

As the Hero and his companions drift on the open sea, they come across one of the militaristic Kooluk nation's merchant ships, which takes them on board. However, the Hero discovers that the ship is actually a military vessel, captained by the Kooluk hero Troy, and that the Hero's former charge Ramada had been a Kooluk spy. Troy catches the Hero eavesdropping, draws steel and easily defeats him in a fight, but then allows the banished knight and his friends to flee. Adrift again, the companions wash up on a deserted island, where they forage for materials and eventually build a raft to leave. This time, they encounter a ship from the friendly kingdom of Obel, and are welcomed as guests.

The ship's crew inspects the Hero, recognizes the Rune on his hand, and sends him to meet with Lino En Kuldes, Obel's young and capable king. Lino En Kuldes hires the Hero, putting him in charge of recruiting new talent to help shore up Obel's defenses in the event of a Kooluk invasion. The Hero's first assignment is to meet and recruit the inventor Oleg. During their meeting, Oleg's invention (the world's first movie camera) captures Kooluk's Rune Cannon strike on Illuya. This prompts the King of Obel to take serious action, but too late; Obel is next on Kooluk's list, and the Hero, his friends, and Lino En Kuldes himself are all forced to flee in Obel's secret flagship (which becomes the hero's HQ for the remainder of the game). The Kooluk forces, with the backing of the arms merchant Graham Cray, conquer Obel with ease, establishing a foothold for their planned southern expansion.

In need of help, the Hero and company join forces with the pirate queen Kika, who suggests the recruitment of the tactician Lady Elenor Silverberg. Elenor is reluctant to help, but joins once she hears that Graham Cray is involved. She quickly forms a plan to liberate each of the Island Nations, then bring them together to face the Kooluk as a united front.

The Hero leads his forces from island to island, recruiting more and more along the way. Eventually, his campaign takes him back to Razril, where Snowe and his lord father have sold everyone out in the hopes of a peaceful takeover. The liberation of Razril succeeds, and Snowe leaves in further disgrace. (Later, depending on the player's actions, the Hero either tracks Snowe down and befriends him again, tracks him down and executes him, or just forgets about him entirely.)

As the company's forces continue to grow, Lino En Kuldes successfully leads the fight to recapture Obel. That leaves only Kooluk's regional base of operations, El Eal, where the threat remains of the giant rune cannon that destroyed the city Iluya. Elenor devises a two-pronged attack, and the night before it is to be executed, Lino En Kuldes tells the Hero the story of how his wife died using the Rune of Punishment against pirates to save her two children, Flare and her little brother, who was lost to the sea after that event.

The fruition of Elenor's plan to attack El Eal ultimately brings both she and the Hero face-to-face with Graham Cray. Cray summons an enormous tree-like creature, both to dispose of the Hero and to claim the Rune of Punishment for himself. The Hero defeats the tree, leaving a wounded Cray in the now-collapsing fortress. As the company flees, Elenor stays behind to confront Cray — her former student — and apparently dies along with him in El Eal's collapse.

Just as the Hero escapes the fortress, Troy appears and challenges him to a final duel. They fight aboard a sinking ship, where the Hero claims victory. Returning the favor from before, the Hero offers Troy a lifeline, but Troy chooses to go down with the ship instead. El Eal explodes, forcing the Hero activate the Rune of Punishment one last time, followed by the Hero passing out. During his final vision of the Rune's memories the Hero sees an image of the deceased wife of Lino En Kuldes, presumably his mother, who seems to recognize him.

Lino En Kuldes is shown holding a meeting of all the leaders of the Island Nations in Obel, where he proposes the creation of a new Island Nations Federation. The leaders unanimously agree to its creation, and Lino becomes its first chairman. The Hero is notably absent from this meeting.

It is not made entirely clear what happened after the Hero saves the fleet; however, the final, post-credits scene shows the Hero floating motionless in a lifeboat, presumably sent away from the Island Nations to remove the Rune of Punishment which had caused so much destruction from the region. If the player recruited all 108 Stars of Destiny, the Hero then awakens and attempts to wave over the passing HQ ship.

== Reception ==
Reception

Aggregate score
Aggregator	Score
Metacritic	63/100

Review scores
Publication	Score
Edge	4/10
Electronic Gaming Monthly	6/10
Eurogamer	6/10
Famitsu	30/40
Game Informer	8.5/10
GamePro	3.5/5
GameRevolution	D+
GameSpot	6.7/10
GameSpy	3/5
GameZone	8/10
IGN	7.9/10
Official U.S. PlayStation Magazine	3/5
Detroit Free Press	2/4

Suikoden IV sold reasonably well in Japan, selling 303,069 copies by the end of 2004. This was down from the 377,729 Japanese sales of Suikoden III, however; Famitsu also gave it a score of one eight, one seven, one eight, and one seven for a total of 30 out of 40. The game did not sell as well as Suikoden III in North America and received "mixed" reviews according to the review aggregation website Metacritic.

While some new features were praised, many were disappointed in the fourth entry, to the point where it is widely considered the weakest of the five games. However, the voice acting in the North American version was generally recognized as a good addition and well-done. The plot was also considered a strong point, if perhaps somewhat slow at first, and perhaps reason enough to play the game. Snowe Vingerhut was also widely praised as an excellent character; IGN said that "...his evolution as a character was definitely one of the best in any game of recent memory... I don't think there's another character like him in an RPG to date - and watching his ups, downs, and movements in-between, will likely be most people's driving force towards finishing Suikoden IV's storyline."

However, the plot was not completely given a pass. Many felt that the pacing was uneven, and that the game was entirely too short. An RPGFan review said, "If one just played the game straight, getting only the characters they earned through story events, Suikoden IV could arguably be beaten in 15 hours - and it would only take that long because of the sailing and frequent random battles." Due to the game's brevity, the characterization was thin, especially among supporting characters. The main villain's motives and past don't seem to be fully explored, either. Additionally, the return to a silent protagonist after Suikoden III did away with the tradition was considered unwise by many, with the hero remaining mute and unresponsive even when falsely accused of murder. Christian Nutt of GameSpy wrote, "This was much more plausible in the era of small, 2D characters. It doesn't work very well this time around."

Traveling between the Island Nations was considered overly annoying by some; GameSpot wrote that "a horrible seafaring travel system and an often outrageous enemy encounter rate detract much from the experience." The long time gap also meant that Suikoden IV was rather unconnected with the first three installments, with only a very few characters returning. The new four-person battle system was not well received by long-term fans of the series, as with the huge number of playable characters, there was less ability to experiment with different character combinations. The skill system from Suikoden III was removed as well, rendering characters less distinct, and the number of equipable runes were reduced from earlier installments. This simplified battle system was criticized as being too easy.
