= Suikoden V =

2006 video game

- Developers: Konami; Hudson Soft
- Publisher: Konami
- Director: Takahiro Sakiyama
- Artists: Kaori Fujita; Kizaki Sub-zero; Mikisato; Riya Hozumi
- Writer: Kazuyoshi Tsugawa
- Composers: Yoshihiro Tsukahara; Takashi Watanabe; Kuniyuki Takahashi; Chiharu Mukaiyama
- Series: Suikoden
- Platform: PlayStation 2
- Release: JP: February 23, 2006; NA: March 21, 2006; EU: September 22, 2006; AU: October 13, 2006
- Genre: Role-playing
- Mode: Single-player

Suikoden V (Japanese: 幻想水滸伝V, Hepburn: Gensō Suikoden Faibu;) is a role-playing video game developed by Konami and Hudson Soft and published by Konami for the Sony PlayStation 2 video game console and the fifth and final main installment of the Suikoden video game series. It was released in 2006, and has sold around 200,000 copies in Japan.

Loosely based on a classical Chinese novel, Shui Hu Zhuan by Shi Nai'an,Suikoden V centers on the political struggles of the Queendom of Falena, and takes place 6 in-universe years before the events of the first Suikoden. The player controls the Prince of Falena and travels the world, acquiring allies and dealing with the problems of the nation. The game features a vast array of characters, with over sixty characters usable in combat and many more able to help or hinder the Prince in a variety of ways.

== Gameplay ==
Suikoden V is a role-playing video game and thus features many of the usual traits. The player controls the Prince and travels with him around the world map, advancing the plot by completing tasks and talking with other characters. The Prince can also recruit new characters to his cause, which often involves a short sidequest. In towns, the player can gather information, sharpen character's weaponry, learn new skills and buy equipment; wilderness areas generally feature random encounters with monsters. The game runs at 60 FPS and is the first 3d Suikoden game to feature a camera system similar to the top down perspective of the first 2 games.

The battle system to Suikoden V features six person parties in combat rather than the four person parties of Suikoden IV, reversing a much-decried change. Each character is individually controllable, as well (as opposed to Suikoden III). A variety of statistics in Suikoden V determine in-game combat ability. Like in Suikoden III, there exists a skill system in Suikoden V; for instance, the "Stamina" skill increases a character's hit points. Different characters have affinities for different skills. Only two skills can be equipped to each character, though they can be switched at any time between battles. If all six characters lose all their hit points and are thus incapacitated, it is game over and the player must restart. Exceptions exist for certain plot battles in which winning is optional; the player can lose and the plot continues on, albeit in a slightly different fashion.

The characters can be set up in a variety of fighting formations across a roughly 6x4 grid. Each formation allows the party to gain increased statistics, such as increased defense or increased attacks, occasionally offset by decreased stats in other categories, as well as a special attack based on the formation. New formations are acquired over the course of the game. Like in previous games, some characters have special cooperative attacks that can potentially do more damage. These attacks often do more damage than normal and cannot miss, but they also cannot receive critical damage bonuses and cannot hit targets multiple times. An auto-battle function is enable as well for quickly breezing through easy battles.

Characters that don't participate directly in combat usually offer other services to the Prince, such as running a shop, giving clues for potential recruits, or aiding in the strategic war battles. Additionally, up to four characters may be kept in reserve of the current party; some non-combat characters, when in the reserve, offer minor benefits such as healing after battle or a greater chance of finding a special item after battle.

Runes, the source of all magic in the world of Suikoden, are handled similarly to other Suikoden games. Characters have a certain number of spell usages per "spell level;" for instance, a character with four level 1 spell slots and a Water Rune could cast "Kindness Drops" (the level 1 Water Rune spell) four times. Other runes offer different benefits, and some may be used as often as desired.

The strategic war battles from earlier Suikodens return for major army clashes, in real-time with more freedom of movement than the hex and square based earlier installments. Instead, the battlefield is now continuous. Both land and naval battles exist in Suikoden V; some battles even combine both elements. The system is analogous to Rock, Paper, Scissors, where cavalry beats infantry, infantry beats archers, and archers beat cavalry; at sea, ram ships are strong against archery ships, infantry ships defeat rams, and archery ships beat infantry ships. There are also additional benefits to having certain characters in certain units, such as magical attacks using runes or leadership bonuses. A few special units exist as well in beaver units and dragon cavalry units, which can travel on both sea and land.

Suikoden V also contains a number of minigames, including, but not limited to, fishing, accessible through the character Subala, and Blind Man's Bluff, a card game that Linfa plays.

== Story ==
=== Setting ===
Suikoden V takes place in the Queendom of Falena, portraying the events of that region of the Suikoden world six years before the events in Suikoden and 142 years after the events in Suikoden IV (~IS 449). The Queendom of Falena is a relatively rich land sustained by the Feitas River, which connects its disparate parts and enables trade and communication. It is ruled by Queen Arshtat and her husband Ferid, who have been a balancing and steady force since the demise of her somewhat rash mother. However, the tensions of the past have not been entirely settled. Arshtat's mother and aunt had been engaged in a covert struggle for power over the succession. Falena's government also has powerful nobles who maintain their own separate forces, loyal to them. Arshtat's hand in marriage was seen as key to gaining power in the future by the nobles; a civil war was narrowly averted when Ferid, a neutral outsider, won the Sacred Games and thus the right to marry Arshtat.

Arshtat and Ferid begat two heirs, the Prince (named by the player, called Freyjadour in the manga) and Lymsleia. At the beginning of Suikoden V, the time has come for Lymsleia's Sacred Games, a gladiatorial tournament in which the winner may ask for the future Queen's hand in marriage. (As a Queendom rather than a Kingdom, the first-born female is in line for the throne.) Aside from the many freelancers, suitors, and independent nobles who desire this prize, the two most powerful noble houses both bear a special interest in it; like with Arshtat's Sacred Games, Lymsleia's hand could prove a crucial advantage. The Godwins believe that Falena needs to be more centralized, powerful and perhaps expansionistic. The Barows seek more to rebuild and trade with foreign nations. The Barows faction has of late been somewhat on the decline, though they are still powerful; a recent war with the neighboring New Armes Kingdom was fought on Barows-allied lands, while the Godwins remained safe and untouched in the west of Falena, perhaps explaining the Barows wish to not further antagonize Armes. The royal family and others worry that if a Godwin or Barows were to win, it might well trigger another struggle.

A key part of the Suikoden setting is the existence of Runes, the source of all magic. Any person can have a rune inscribed on them, although some people are more talented in their use, and others can inscribe more than one rune (with three as the general maximum). In turn, all power from individual carved runes ultimately descends from the powerful 27 True Runes, which created the world in Suikoden's mythology. Falena's national treasure is the Sun Rune, a True Rune which can both bring prosperity and growth as well as destruction and calamity. Falena also controls the "child" runes of the Sun Rune, the Dawn Rune and Twilight Rune.

However, Falena's grip on the runes has gone somewhat awry. Two years prior to the start of Suikoden V, residents of Lordlake rioted and charged the East Palace, near the capital of Sol-Falena. In the confusion, the Dawn Rune, which was housed there, was stolen. Lordlake had previously been considered the most loyal of all the towns to the royal government and granted special privileges. With this seeming act of high treason by Lordlake, Arshtat took the Sun Rune upon herself, normally stored in Sol-Falena's palace on a pedestal, and used the Rune's power to scorch Lordlake's vegetation, wildlife and river, killing its leader Lord Rovere in the process. Since bearing the Sun Rune, the normally compassionate Arshtat has grown more and more erratic in behavior, prone to mood swings and wild fits of vengeance.

=== Characters ===
As with previous Suikoden titles, there are "108 Stars of Destiny" to recruit in the game. While some characters join as per the story's requirements, others require that the Prince recruit them either at a specific time, or by fulfilling particular conditions. As such, certain characters can be missed entirely.

Some of the characters from Suikoden V appeared in earlier Suikoden games; as Suikoden V takes place before I–III, their experiences in Falena are a prequel of sorts for them. Notably, Georg Prime and Lorelai both play important roles in Suikoden V and appear in other games, while Viki, Jeane and Leknaat continue their run of all Suikoden games to date.

== Plot ==
Two years after Lordlake was razed by her Sun Rune, Queen Arshtat dispatches her son the Prince, her sister Sialeeds, and their royal bodyguards Lyon and Georg Prime to inspect the state of the ruined town. The player as the Prince sees the grim state of the dried-up town and report on it, but Arshtat scorns this; she declares that Lordlake's citizens deserve their desolation for stealing the Dawn Rune. Arshtat's husband Ferid pulls her back to her senses, and she dismisses the inspection party with a whisper.

The next issue of contention is the Sacred Games for Princess Lymsleia's hand in marriage, being held somewhat early for the ten-year-old Lymsleia. The two main contestants, both representing themselves with a champion, hail from rival noble houses: the foppish Euram Barows, and Sialeeds' former fiancé, the charismatic Gizel Godwin. The royal family, however, favors the mysterious outsider Belcoot, as a neutral option less likely to cause strife; the Prince attempts to aid Belcoot quietly with Ferid's approval. However, Gizel successfully rigs the Games to his advantage, and his champion Childerich defeats a drugged Belcoot while the Barow's champion is disqualified.

However, Lord Marscal Godwin, Gizel's father, is less than impressed with Gizel's activities, thinking that he has made an enemy of the Prince and the royal family as a whole with his plotting. Additionally, the royal family took Zegai, the Barows champion, into their own personal custody, who could perhaps help reveal the Godwins cheating and offer an excuse to annul the engagement. Thus, the Godwins launch a preemptive attack at the engagement ceremony in Sol-Falena, Falena's capital. Arshtat and Ferid had anticipated and prepared for the attack, but not the involvement of the elite Nether Gate assassins, who overwhelm the palace's defenses. The struggle culminates in Arshtat and Ferid's deaths, while Lymsleia finds herself a captive. The Prince (whose irrelevance to the line of succession made him the lowest-priority target), Lyon, Georg and Sialeeds are forced to flee.

The Prince searches first for a sanctuary, then for a way to fight back. He finds both (temporarily) as a guest of the influential noble Salum Barows, Lord Godwin's long-time rival. Salum (with his son Euram alongside) clearly plans to be the senior partner in his alliance with the Prince, but the Prince must take what allies he can find. Reluctantly, Sialeeds suggests bringing in help in the form of the legendary tactician Lucretia Merces, whom the Prince frees from prison. With her intelligence and vast network of contacts, Lucretia finds out that the Barows were behind the theft of the Dawn Rune – an act of high treason. With this revelation, the Prince is able to convince the Barows' allies to join him personally, including even Salum's daughter Luserina. The recovered Dawn Rune picks the Prince as its new bearer, even though the Prince can never inherit the throne.

Lucretia guides the Prince and his army in establishing a headquarters, forging alliances, restoring Lordlake, and winning a long streak of battles. The Godwins crown Lymsleia Queen and claim to fight in her name, but lose the public relations war due to the Prince's resistance, the claims of a coup, the restoration of Lordlake (thus fixing a mistake of Arshtat's rule), and the Godwins' army commanders foolish brutality. The civil war almost comes to a close when Lymsleia takes the field personally, officially due to the Godwin's failure to put down the "rebellion", but actually to be rescued by her brother. The Prince and his forces defeat her bodyguards and attempt to capture Lymsleia back; without Lymsleia, the Godwin's government would collapse. At this juncture, however, Sialeeds defects to Gizel's side, spiriting Lymsleia away and prolonging the conflict. Lyon is seriously wounded, preventing the party from pursuing Lymsleia. Meanwhile, Sialeeds takes up the Twilight Rune, the counterpart to the Dawn Rune held in Godwin territory.

The Godwins enjoy a brief reversal in fortunes with new army levies and an alliance with a faction of Falena's neighbor Armes. However, Falena's normally neutral Dragon Cavalry enters the war on the Prince's side due to Armes' involvement, and the Godwins are driven back once more. Sialeeds ensures that the Prince's forces must capture Stormfist, the seat of Godwin power, and thoroughly erase any possible strongholds of Godwin sympathy. Despite seemingly being affiliated with the Godwins, however, Sialeeds incinerates a Godwin ambush of the Prince's force. Sialeeds later murders Salum Barows in Gizel's name, leaving the whimpering Euram alive with the venomous taunt that the Barows faction will surely fall to ruin with an idiot like him in charge.

Only the capital city of Sol-Falena remains under Godwin control. The battle for it claims the lives of both Sialeeds and Gizel. As she expires, Sialeeds hints at her motives (which her maids confirm, if the player speaks with them later): she knew that, if the Prince had rescued Lymsleia when he first had the chance, things only would have returned to the way they were before, with the same corrupt nobility holding power struggles. The only way, in her mind, to secure the royal family's hold on the Queendom was to prolong the war such that the nobility would be completely and utterly ruined. By doing it in the Godwins' name, the Prince and Lymsleia could be rid of them without getting their hands dirty. As Gizel dies, felled by the Prince in a duel, he declares that Sialeeds was the only real winner. Lord Marscal, the only remaining Godwin, retreats with the Sun Rune to a nearby mountain range, where he meets the Prince in a showdown to prove that the royals can rule without the power of the Sun Rune. He draws the Rune's power into himself for the final battle with the Rune incarnation.

In the ending, Lymsleia re-assumes the throne and dissolves the Senate, though a new representative parliament is created to replace it and advise the Queen. Depending on the player's choices and performance, several endings are possible. If very few optional stars of destiny were recruited, Lyon dies of the wounds she received earlier and the Prince wanders off alone in despair. If most but not all of the stars were recruited, the Prince travels the world with Georg. If all 108 Stars were recruited, Lyon survives. If the Prince chose to be nice when interacting with Lymsleia, he has the further option of staying in Falena and becoming the new Commander of the Queen's Knights, with Lyon by his side.

== Development ==
Suikoden V was directed by Takahiro Sakiyama, a newcomer to the Suikoden franchise, and written by Kazuyoshi Tsugawa, who served as the writer for The Sword of Etheria and worked on the battle system design for Skies of Arcadia.

Development of the game started when Sakiyama was working on a side-game (gaiden) to the Suikoden series at a conceptual stage. Producer Noritada Matsukawa asked him if he was interested in directing Suikoden V. The gaiden project was cancelled and Sakiyama fully focused on the development of a main game. On the next day after having been asked to direct the game, he drafted the framework of the scenario.

== Soundtrack ==
The music was composed by Yoshihiro Tsukahara, Takashi Watanabe, Kuniyuki Takahashi, and Chiharu Mukaiyama under the direction of Konami veteran Norikazu Miura. The opening theme, "Wind of Phantom", was composed by Yuji Toriyama, conducted by Robin Smith, and performed by the Royal Philharmonic Orchestra.

The complete Genso Suikoden V OST, featuring all the music from the game in original form, was released on March 24, 2006. A shorter "Limited Edition" demo disc with 10 tracks had been released earlier.

== Reception ==
Reception

Aggregate score
| Aggregator | Score |
|---|---|
| Metacritic | 76/100 |

Review scores
| Publication | Score |
|---|---|
| Electronic Gaming Monthly | 6.5/10 |
| Eurogamer | 7/10 |
| Famitsu | 32/40 |
| Game Informer | 7.5/10 |
| GameRevolution | C+ |
| GameSpot | 8.1/10 |
| GameSpy | 4.5/5 |
| GameTrailers | 8.5/10 |
| GameZone | 8.1/10 |
| IGN | 8.2/10 |
| Official U.S. PlayStation Magazine | 3/5 |
| The Times | 2/5 |

Suikoden V had disappointing sales compared to earlier PlayStation 2 Suikodens. In 2006 in Japan, the game sold 194,780 copies, down from Suikoden IV's 303,069. Famitsu gave it a score of one nine, two eights, and one seven for a total of 32 out of 40.

Elsewhere, the game received "generally favorable reviews" according to the review aggregation website Metacritic. The plot received praise for the depth of its political maneuverings, even if the game starts off somewhat slowly: GameSpy said, "Suikoden V has a robust, well-done plot that doesn't telegraph every twist or conform to embarrassing clichés." Most reviewers also found the cast of characters engaging, as well; GameSpot said that "Suikoden's always been great at making the stars evince unique personalities with just a few exchanges of conversation, and there's lots of interesting people to meet and lure to your forces." Suikoden V also reversed some of the unpopular changes of Suikoden IV (such as 4-person parties), and offered some tie-ins to Suikoden and Suikoden II for fans of the original PlayStation games.

The graphics and loading times were generally criticized, however. IGN wrote, "there's a ton of loading everywhere you turn. Moving from one area to another means 2-5 second loads; initiating a battle means 7-10 second loads; winning a skirmish brings 4-6 second loads afterwards." Game Revolution said of the graphics that "Army battles and in-engine cut scenes look blocky and raw, but the CGI cut scenes are beautiful and detailed. Towns look great, but dungeons are horrid, bland, maze-like nightmares."

Suikoden V won IGN's 2006 award for Best Story on the PlayStation 2. It also won the Danish gaming magazine Gamereactor's award for Best Story overall, and was named the 9th best game of the year by them.
