= Magic (game terminology) =

Character attribute in role-playing games

A mana bar or magic bar, used to keep track of a character's magic points (MP) in a video game

Magic or mana is an attribute assigned to characters within a role-playing or video game that indicates their power to use special magical abilities or "spells". Magic is usually measured in magic points or mana points, shortened as MP. Different abilities will use up different amounts of MP. When the MP of a character reaches zero, the character will not be able to use special abilities until some of their MP is recovered.

Much like health, magic might be displayed as a numeric value, such as "50/100". Here, the first number indicates the current amount of MP a character has whereas the second number indicates the character's maximum MP. In video games, magic can also be displayed visually, such as with a gauge that empties itself as a character uses their abilities.

== History ==
The magic system in tabletop role-playing games such as Dungeons & Dragons is largely based on patterns established in the Dying Earth novels of author Jack Vance. In this system, the player character can only memorize a fixed number of spells from a list of spells. Once this spell is used once, the character forgets it and becomes unable to use it again.

"Mana" is a word that comes from Polynesian languages with a complex meaning. Mostly, it loosely represents power, respect and dignity. The concept of mana was introduced in Europe by missionary Robert Henry Codrington in 1891 and was popularized by Mircea Eliade in the 1950s. It was first introduced as a magical fuel used to cast spells in the 1969 short story, "Not Long Before the End", by Larry Niven, which is part of and later popularized by his The Magic Goes Away setting. It has since become a common staple in both role-playing and video games.

== Mechanisms ==
Because skills and abilities are not usually lost, a game designer might decide to limit the use of such an ability by linking its use to magic points. This way, after using an ability, the player is required to rest or use an item to replenish their character's MP. This is done for balancing, so that each skill does not have an infinite casting ability with equal results every time.

"Magic" may be substituted with psychic powers, spiritual power, advanced technology or other concepts that would allow a character to influence the world around them that is not available in real life. Magic is often restricted to a specific class of character, such as a "mage" or "spellcaster", while other character classes have to rely on melee combat or physical projectiles. Other character classes, such as those that rely on melee attacks, may also have a "magic" bar that limits their special abilities, although they are usually called something different, such as the Barbarian's "Fury" in Diablo 3.

In video games, MP can often be restored by consuming magic potions or it may regenerate over time. Status effects are temporary modification to a game character's original set of stats. A character may cast a spell that inflicts a positive or negative status effect on another character.

=== In role-playing games ===
In both tabletop role-playing games and role-playing video games (RPG), magic is most usually used to cast spells during battles. However magic has many uses outside of combat situations, such as using love spells on NPCs to gain information. Some games base the strength and amount of a character's magic on stats such as "wisdom" or "intelligence". These stats are used because they are easy to keep track of and develop in pen-and-paper RPGs.

Some games introduce a separate point system per skill. For example, in the Pokémon games, each skill of each fighting character has its own "Power Points" (PP). If the PP of only one of its skills are depleted, that specific Pokémon still has three other skills to choose from.

=== In god games ===
In god games, the player's power is usually called mana and grows along with the number and prosperity of the player's worshipers. Here, the population size influences the maximum amount of mana the player has and the rate at which their mana restores itself when it is below that maximum. Using "godly powers" consumes mana, but such actions are necessary to increase the number and prosperity of the population.

== See also ==
- Health (game terminology)
- Experience point
- Magic in fiction
