= Xbox Developer Direct =

Livestream events produced by Microsoft Gaming

Xbox Developer_Direct
- Logo since 2024
- Status: Active
- Genre: Video game livestream event
- Frequency: Annually
- Location: Worldwide
- Years active: 2023–present
- Inaugurated: January 25, 2023
- Most recent: January 22, 2026
- Organiser: Xbox

Xbox Developer Direct (stylized as Developer_Direct) is a series of livestream events produced by Xbox to showcase upcoming first-party content from Xbox Game Studios, Bethesda Softworks, Activision, Blizzard Entertainment, and King. The livestreams also include third-party titles. The Developer Direct takes place at the beginning of each year in January.

== History ==
Xbox Developer Direct was founded as part of Microsoft's ongoing efforts to enhance communication and engagement with gamers worldwide. Prior to Developer Direct, some critics argued that Xbox needed to have a showcase to establish "brand identity" and differentiate themselves from other competitors' platform showcases such as Nintendo Direct and State of Play. Additionally, there were suggestions that Xbox should be more transparent regarding the development of their video games.

The first showcase was announced on January 11, 2023, and took place on January 25, 2023. Developer Direct has evolved and expanded. Initially focusing on presentations from Xbox Game Studios and Bethesda Softworks, in 2024 the event series has grown to encompass a broader range of developers and publishers, including third-party titles. Following Microsoft Gaming's strategic pivot towards multiplatform publishing in 2024, the January 2025 installment of Xbox Developer Direct was the first presentation to advertise the availability of Xbox's first and second-party titles on platforms outside Microsoft's ecosystem, such as Ninja Gaiden 4 and Doom: The Dark Ages on PlayStation 5. Microsoft Gaming CEO Phil Spencer confirmed the following month that all Microsoft Gaming showcases going forward would be transparent about the availability of their games on PlayStation and Nintendo consoles. Asha Sharma later stated that Xbox showcases following the Xbox Games Showcase 2026 would return to focusing exclusively on games presented for Xbox platforms. Previously, during the Xbox Podcast on May 29, 2026, Matt Booty had confirmed that the Xbox Games Showcase 2026 would maintain Microsoft's transparency policy by indicating the availability of titles on non-Microsoft platforms. Following the event, Xbox Wire's official recap omitted references to other platforms, including Steam, for Xbox first-party and second-party titles.

== Format ==
Each Xbox Developer Direct event typically features a combination of announcements, trailers, gameplay reveals, and developer interviews. These presentations offer audiences a look into upcoming games, downloadable content (DLC), expansion packs, updates, and other relevant developments. The format allows developers to showcase their games directly to fans and consumers and announce brand-new video game content.

== List of events ==
Alongside the Xbox Developer Direct livestreams, other Xbox events without the "Xbox Developer Direct" branding are listed.

=== Xbox Developer Direct ===
| Name | Date | Duration | Games featured | Ref. |
|---|---|---|---|---|
| Developer_Direct | January 25, 2023 | 44 minutes | Minecraft Legends, Forza Motorsport, Hi-Fi Rush, The Elder Scrolls Online: Necrom, Redfall | |
| Developer_Direct '24 | January 18, 2024 | 48 minutes and 42 seconds | Avowed, Senua's Saga: Hellblade II, Visions of Mana, Ara: History Untold, Indiana Jones and the Great Circle | |
| Developer_Direct '25 | January 23, 2025 | 52 minutes and 29 seconds | Ninja Gaiden 4, Ninja Gaiden 2 Black, South of Midnight, Clair Obscur: Expedition 33, Doom: The Dark Ages | |
| Developer_Direct '26 | January 22, 2026 | 52 minutes and 48 seconds | Fable, Forza Horizon 6, Beast of Reincarnation, Kiln | |

=== Xbox Games Showcase ===
The Xbox Games Showcase debuted in 2021 as a joint presentation between Xbox Game Studios and Bethesda Softworks replacing the publisher's traditional E3 press conference around that timeframe, before being rebranded to reflect the expanded Microsoft Gaming group. The showcase similarly recurs annually during the summer season, and features a mix of previously announced and new titles from across Xbox's subsidiaries and an array of third-party partners. Since 2023, Xbox Games Showcase has been immediately followed by a dedicated "Direct" presentation specifically focused on an upcoming game from Xbox's first-party studios.

| Name | Date | Duration | Games featured | Ref. |
|---|---|---|---|---|
| Xbox & Bethesda Games Showcase E3 2021 | June 13, 2021 | 2 hours, 15 minutes | Starfield, Halo Infinite, Forza Horizon 5, Redfall, Diablo II: Resurrected, S.T.A.L.K.E.R. 2: Heart of Chornobyl, Back 4 Blood, Battlefield 2042, Contraband, The Outer Worlds 2, Sea of Thieves: A Pirate's Life, Grounded, Yakuza series, Eiyuden Chronicle: Hundred Heroes, Eiyuden Chronicle: Rising, Twelve Minutes, Psychonauts 2, Microsoft Flight Simulator, Age of Empires IV, Doom Eternal, Fallout 76, The Elder Scrolls Online, Party Animals, Hades, Somerville, A Plague Tale: Requiem, Far Cry 6, Slime Rancher 2, Atomic Heart, Shredders, Replaced, Among Us, The Ascent | |
| Xbox & Bethesda Games Showcase | June 12, 2022 | 1 hour, 35 minutes and 18 seconds | Redfall, Hollow Knight: Silksong, High on Life, A Plague Tale: Requiem, Forza Motorsport, Microsoft Flight Simulator, Overwatch 2, Ara: History Untold, The Elder Scrolls Online - High Isle, Fallout 76, Forza Horizon 5, Ark 2, Flintlock: The Siege of Dawn, Minecraft Legends, Lightyear Frontier, Gunfire Reborn, The Last Case of Benedict Fox, League of Legends, League of Legends: Wild Rift, Valorant, As Dusk Falls, Naraka: Bladepoint, Pentiment, Grounded, Ereban: Shadow Legacy, Diablo IV, Sea of Thieves, Ravenlok, Cocoon, Wo Long: Fallen Dynasty, Persona 3 Portable, Persona 4 Golden, Persona 5 Royal, OD, Starfield | |
| Xbox Games Showcase + Starfield Direct | June 11, 2023 | 1 hour, 52 minutes, and 18 seconds | Fable, South of Midnight, Star Wars: Outlaws, 33 Immortals, Payday 3, Persona 3 Reload, Avowed, Sea of Thieves, Microsoft Flight Simulator, Microsoft Flight Simulator 2024, Senua's Saga: Hellblade 2, Like A Dragon: Infinite Wealth, Fallout 76, Kunitsu-Gami: Path of the Goddess, Forza Motorsport, The Elder Scrolls Online: Necrom, Overwatch 2, Persona 5 Tactica, Starfield, Jusant, Still Wakes The Deep, Dungeons of Hinterberg, Cyberpunk 2077 Phantom Liberty, Cities: Skylines II, Metaphor: ReFantazio, Towerborne, Clockwork Revolution | |
| Xbox Games Showcase + Call of Duty: Black Ops 6 Direct | June 9, 2024 | 1 hour, 47 minutes, and 7 seconds | Call of Duty: Black Ops 6, Doom: The Dark Ages, State of Decay 3, Dragon Age: The Veilguard, Starfield: Shattered Space, Fallout 76, Clair Obscur: Expedition 33, South of Midnight, World of Warcraft: The War Within, Metal Gear Solid Delta: Snake Eater, Sea of Thieves, Flintlock: The Siege of Dawn, Age of Mythology: Retold, Perfect Dark, Diablo IV: Vessel of Hatred, Fable, FragPunk, Winter Burrow, Mixtape, Microsoft Flight Simulator 2024, The Elder Scrolls Online: Gold Road, Life is Strange: Double Exposure, Indiana Jones and the Great Circle, Mecha Break, Avowed, Atomfall, Assassin's Creed Shadows, S.T.A.L.K.E.R. 2: Heart of Chornobyl, Gears of War: E-Day | |
| Xbox Games Showcase + The Outer Worlds 2 and Grounded 2 Direct | June 8, 2025 | 1 hour, 58 minutes, and 49 seconds | The Outer Worlds 2, High on Life 2, Resonance: A Plague Tale Legacy, Hollow Knight: Silksong, The Blood of Dawnwalker, Super Meat Boy 3D, Ninja Gaiden 4, Indiana Jones and the Great Circle – The Order of Giants, Beast of Reincarnation, Clockwork Revolution, Grounded 2, Cronos: The New Dawn, The Elder Scrolls Online, Aphelion, There Are No Ghosts At the Grand, Age of Mythology: Retold – Heavenly Spear, Mudang Two Hearts, Planet of Lana II: Children of the Leaf, Fallout 76, Solo Leveling: Arise Overdrive, Aniimo, Tony Hawk's Pro Skater 3 + 4, At Fate's End, Gears of War: Reloaded, Persona 4 Revival, Sea of Thieves, Invincible VS, Final Fantasy VII Remake Intergrade, Final Fantasy XVI, Keeper, Call of Duty: Black Ops 7 | |
| Xbox Games Showcase + Gears of War: E-Day Direct | June 7, 2026 | 1 hour, 41 minutes, and 13 seconds | Gears of War: E-Day, Fable, Halo: Campaign Evolved, Resonance: A Plague Tale Legacy, Persona 4 Revival, State of Decay 3, Sea of Thieves, Metro 2039, Bad Magpie, Wo Long 2: Wings of Ember, Join Us, Senua, Fallout 76, Doom: The Dark Ages, Crazy Taxi: World Tour, Age of Empires IV, Minecraft Dungeons II, Magicians: The Devil's Deal, Valor Mortis, The Elder Scrolls Online, Microsoft Flight Simulator 2024, Where Winds Meet, Castlevania: Belmont's Curse, Vivarium, Persona 6, Spyro: A Realm Beyond, Clockwork Revolution, Call of Duty: Modern Warfare 4 | |

=== Xbox Partner Preview ===
Xbox Partner Preview debuted in 2023 as a shorter presentation of previously announced and newly debuted upcoming titles, coming to Xbox platforms from third-party publishers.

| Name | Date | Duration | Games featured | Ref. |
|---|---|---|---|---|
| Xbox Partner Preview | October 25, 2023 | 28 minutes and 51 seconds | Metal Gear Solid Delta: Snake Eater, Alan Wake 2, Ark: Survival Ascended, Like a Dragon: Infinite Wealth, Still Wakes the Deep, Manor Lords, IKARO: Will Not Die, Spirit of the North 2, RoboCop: Rogue City, Dungeons of Hinterberg, The Finals | |
| Xbox Partner Preview | March 6, 2024 | 29 minutes and 31 seconds | Unknown 9: Awakening, Sleight of Hand, The Alters, Creatures of Ava, Roblox, The Sinking City 2, S.T.A.L.K.E.R. Legends of the Zone Trilogy, Monster Jam Showdown, Persona 3 Reload, The First Berserker: Khazan, Tales of Kenzera: Zau, Frostpunk 2, Final Fantasy XIV Online, Kunitsu-Gami: Path of the Goddess | |
| Xbox Partner Preview | October 17, 2024 | 28 minutes and 43 seconds | Alan Wake 2 - The Lake House, Cronos: The New Dawn, Blindfire, Like a Dragon: Pirate Yakuza in Hawaii, Mouse: P.I. For Hire Subnautica 2, Animal Well, Edens Zero, Eternal Strands, Mistfall Hunter, Wheel World, Phasmophobia, The Legend Of Baboo, Wuchang: Fallen Feathers, FBC: Firebreak | |
| Xbox Partner Preview | November 20, 2025 | 33 minutes and 48 seconds | 007 First Light, Reanimal, Tides of Annihilation, Crowsworn, Zoopunk, Armatus, CloverPit, Dave The Diver, Echo Generation 2, Hitman: World of Assassination, Total Chaos, Vampire Crawlers, Roadside Research, Raji: Kaliyuga, The Mound: Omen of Cthulu, Erosion | |
| Xbox Partner Preview | March 26, 2026 | 33 minutes and 18 seconds | Stranger Than Heaven, S.T.A.L.K.E.R. 2: Heart of Chornobyl - Cost of Hope, The Expanse: Osiris Reborn, Serious Sam: Shatterverse, Wuthering Waves, Super Meat Boy 3D, Bluey: Happy Snaps, Grave Seasons, Ascend to Zero, The Eternal Life of Goldman, Moosa: Dirty Fate, Forever Ago, Artificial Detective, Frog Sqwad, ADS: Alien Deathstorm, Vaunted, Hunter: The Reckoning - Deathwish, Dispatch, Hades II | |

=== Xbox Presents ===
Xbox Presents is a new format introduced in 2026 that encompasses standalone presentations dedicated to upcoming Xbox games.

| Name | Date | Duration | Games featured | Ref. |
|---|---|---|---|---|
| Xbox Presents: A First Look at Metro 2039 | April 16, 2026 | 15 minutes | Metro 2039 | |
| Xbox Presents: A Special Look at Stranger Than Heaven | May 6, 2026 | 32 minutes and 17 seconds | Stranger Than Heaven | |

=== Xbox Tokyo Game Show ===
Since 2021, an Xbox presentation has aired in conjunction with the annually scheduled Tokyo Game Show in September, highlighting a slate of upcoming games from Xbox's first-party studios, Japanese third-party publishers, and select independent developers.

| Name | Date | Duration | Games featured | Ref. |
|---|---|---|---|---|
| Xbox Showcase - Tokyo Game Show 2021 | September 30, 2021 | 50 minutes and 54 seconds | Scarlet Nexus, AI: The Somnium Files, Mighty Goose, Back 4 Blood, Forza Horizon 5, Halo Infinite, Ghostwire: Tokyo, Redfall, Starfield, The Good Life, Eternal Return | |
| Xbox Tokyo Game Show 2022 | September 15, 2022 | 39 minutes and 39 seconds | Persona 5 Royal, Wo Long: Fallen Dynasty, Exoprimal, BlazBlue: Cross Tag Battle - Special Edition, Guilty Gear Strive, Naraka: Bladepoint, Ni no Kuni: Wrath of the White Witch Remastered, Danganronpa V3: Killing Harmony, Overwatch 2, Eiyuden Chronicle: Hundred Heroes, Dyson Sphere Program Forza Horizon 5, Palworld, Assassin's Creed Odyssey, Fuga: Melodies of Steel, Fuga: Melodies of Steel 2, Deathloop | |
| Xbox Tokyo Game Show 2023 | September 21, 2023 | 41 minutes and 4 seconds | Phoenix Wright: Ace Attorney Trilogy, Forza Motorsport, Mineko's Night Market, Like a Dragon Gaiden: The Man Who Erased His Name, Like a Dragon: Ishin!, Persona 5 Tactica, Persona 3 Reload, Eiyuden Chronicle: Hundred Heroes, Octopath Traveler II, Fallout 76, The Elder Scrolls Online, Altheia: The Wrath of Aferi, Exoprimal, Infinity Strash: Dragon Quest The Adventure of Dai. My Lovely Express, Palworld, Party Animals, PUBG: Battlegrounds, Wo Long: Fallen Dynasty | |
| Xbox Tokyo Game Show 2024 | September 26, 2024 | 51 minutes and 11 seconds | Metal Gear Solid Delta: Snake Eater, StarCraft: Remastered, StarCraft II, Overwatch 2, Age of Mythology: Retold - Immortal Pillars, Tanuki Pon's Summer, Threads of Time, Indiana Jones and the Great Circle, We Love Katamari ReROLL + Royal Reverie, Metaphor: ReFantazio, FragPunk, Atelier Yumia: The Alchemist of Memories & The Envisioned Land, Asurajang Rumble, Fallout 76, Synduality: Echo of Ada, Bleach: Rebirth of Souls, Suikoden I & II HD Remaster: Gate Rune and Dunan Unification Wars, All You Need is Help, The Starbites: Taste of Desert, Slitterhead, Dragon Quest III HD-2D Remake, Legend of Mana, Trials of Mana, Final Fantasy I-VI Pixel Remaster | |
| Xbox Tokyo Game Show 2025 | September 25, 2025 | 52 minutes and 2 seconds | 007 First Light, Aniimo, Double Dragon Revive, Fatal Frame II: Crimson Butterfly Remake, Gungrave G.O.R.E Blood Heat, Hitman: World of Assassination, Hotel Barcelona, Mistfall Hunter, Monster Hunter Stories, Monster Hunter Stories 2: Wings of Ruin, Monster Hunter Stories 3: Twisted Reflection, Project Evilbane, Rhythm Doctor, Starsand Island, Sudden Strike 5, Terminal Brigade, Winter Burrow, Dragon Quest I & II HD-2D Remake, Romancing SaGa 2: Revenge of the Seven, Age of Mythology: Retold - Heavenly Spear, Call of Duty: Black Ops 7, Fallout 76, Microsoft Flight Simulator 2024, Ninja Gaiden 4, Forza Horizon 6 | |
| Xbox Tokyo Game Show 2026 | September 17, 2026 | 42 minutes and 58 seconds | Gachiakuta: Breakout, Crazy Taxi: World Tour, Persona 4 Revival, Call of Duty: Modern Warfare 4, Shape of Dreams, Wo Long 2: Wings of Ember, Hope in the City, Bloomwalker, Faradays Blue, Atelier Karia: The Night Kingdom & the Guide of Memories, Raji: Kalygula, Once Human: Isles of Abyss, Edge of Memories, Genigods: Nezha, Fallout 76, Bloodstained: The Scarlet Engagement, OD, Physint | |

== See also ==
- Nintendo Direct
- State of Play (video program)
- Minecraft Live
- BlizzCon
