= Crowsworn =

Upcoming video game

- Developer: Mongoose Rodeo
- Publisher: Mongoose Rodeo
- Director: Aleksandar Kuzmanovic
- Composer: J.J. Ipsen
- Engine: Unity
- Platforms: Linux; Windows; macOS; Nintendo Switch; PlayStation 5; Xbox Series X/S
- Genre: Metroidvania
- Mode: Single-player

Crowsworn is an upcoming Metroidvania game developed by Canadian independent developer Mongoose Rodeo. The game was funded on Kickstarter, and has not had a new release date announced since a delay in August 2023. It is planned to release on Windows, macOS, Linux, Nintendo Switch, PlayStation 5, and Xbox Series X/S.

== Gameplay ==
Crowsworn is a Metroidvania with elements of the soulslike genre. The player character fights enemies in melee using a scythe, and at range using two guns. They can also utilize Corvian powers, magical abilities that can be used in combat. Use of Corvian powers requires the exertion of an energy called Malice, which can be recharged by attacking enemies with the scythe. The game features platforming, side quests, over 120 enemies, and more than 30 bosses, as well as a boss rush mode and a planned DLC expansion after launch.

== Premise ==
Crowsworn will take place in Fearanndal, a once vibrant kingdom now beset by a curse. Now "overrun by sightless creatures of nightmare", "all but the last remnants of humanity have seemingly vanished". The player will take control of a currently unnamed protagonist with the appearance of a plague doctor and a crow, who wakes up in a coffin suffering from amnesia. As the protagonist, the player will traverse the vast kingdom to end the curse, uncover its origin, and realize their salvation.

== Development and promotion ==
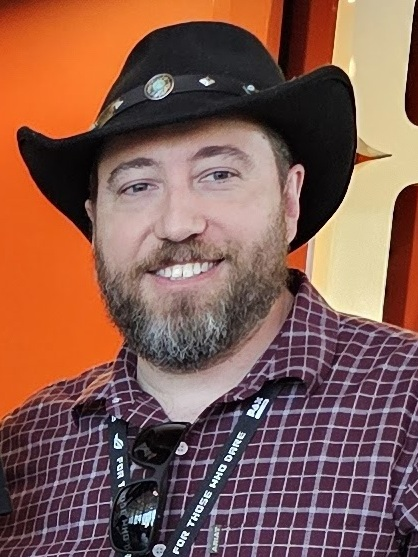
Marketing and publishing manager Matthew Griffin in 2024

The game was first announced on Kickstarter and raised over $1 million CAD by the end of its campaign in August 2021, ahead of its planned funding target of $125,000 CAD. The developers were influenced by the Metroidvania Hollow Knight, and drew further inspiration from Bloodborne and Devil May Cry. Director Aleksandrar Kuzmanovic noted how the game was often compared to Hollow Knight, and desired to find ways to stand out from his inspirations. The game is being marketed by Matthew Griffin, who has worked with Team Cherry and has done marketing for their games Hollow Knight and Hollow Knight: Silksong, and its music is being composed by J.J. Ipsen. Updates for Crowsworn have been frequently posted on Twitter and Kickstarter. In August 2023, Mongoose Rodeo delayed the game from its planned release in December 2023, citing the game's increasing size as a result of raising more funds than planned during the Kickstarter campaign. The game received a new gameplay trailer at the November 2025 Xbox Partner Preview showcase, which showcased a new minecart mechanic, and announced that it will additionally release on the Xbox Series X/S, PlayStation 5, and Nintendo Switch, and that it will be available on Xbox Game Pass at release.

== Reception ==
=== Pre-release ===
GamesRadar+ writer Kaan Serin called the world of Feranndal "stunning", and the combat "excellent-looking". Kate Grey of Nintendo Life was similarly positive describing the game as being "unabashedly Bloodborne-y in its presentation", and stating that "it's fantastically on the nose ... and we bloody love it". Jeuxvideo.com reported that the Kickstarter backer-exclusive demo was praised for its polished art direction, music, sound design, fluid and engaging gameplay, and its fair and challenging difficulty. They reported on only one critique, that being that there can be a "lack of clarity in certain actions and attacks." IGN's Michael Cripe praised the game's "dark fantasy universe" and "cute-but-intimidating characters", and called its November 2025 trailer "what may be Mongoose Rodeo’s most substantial showing in quite some time."

== Spin-off ==
A spin-off multiplayer racing title, Crowkart, is also in development. An early build of the game is currently available to Kickstarter backers, and the full title will release for free later, after Crowsworn's release.
