= Beast of Reincarnation =

2026 video game

- Developer: Game Freak (Note: Additional work and development support by Blast Edge Games, Liona Interactive, Safehouse, C&R Creative Studios, Lakshya Digital, Technicolor Games and others)
- Publisher: Fictions
- Director: Kota Furushima
- Engine: Unreal Engine 5
- Platforms: PlayStation 5; Windows; Xbox Series X/S
- Release: August 4, 2026
- Genre: Action role-playing
- Mode: Single-player

Beast of Reincarnation is an action role-playing game developed by Game Freak and published by Fictions. The game was released on August 4, 2026, for PlayStation 5, Windows and Xbox Series X/S.

Set in Japan in the year 4026, the story follows Emma the Sealer and her dog Koo as they navigate a post-apocalyptic land ruined by corruption.

Beast of Reincarnation received mixed reviews.

== Premise ==
Beast of Reincarnation is described as a "one-person, one-dog action role-playing game". It follows Emma the Sealer, an 18-year-old woman with blight powers who can manipulate plants to traverse and fight enemies. Her companion is a stray dog known as Koo, as they work together to free post-apocalyptic Japan from a corrupted creature that has blighted the natural world. The game's art style and story have been compared to Studio Ghibli works such as Princess Mononoke.

== Gameplay ==
The game focuses heavily on combat, pitting players against various enemies from oversized mutant creatures to robots. The combat system has been compared to other action role-playing games such as Black Myth: Wukong and Sekiro: Shadows Die Twice.

== Development ==
Development of Beast of Reincarnation began in 2020, as part of Game Freak's internal "Gear Project" initiative, which is geared towards fostering new IP outside of the studio's flagship Pokémon role-playing games and had previously resulted in titles like HarmoKnight and Pocket Card Jockey. Following initial prototyping, the studio handled creative direction and overall project management, overseeing the work of several external partners due to the game's larger scope.

== Release ==
The game was announced in May 2023 under the working title Project Bloom as a partnership between Game Freak and Private Division. Upon announcement, scarce details were provided other than a projected 2026 release, the reveal of Furushima as director, and a single piece of concept art showing a lone woman in a forest.

At the Xbox Games Showcase in 2025, the game was publicly revealed for the first time, with a gameplay trailer that confirmed its title as Beast of Reincarnation, along with a release window of 2026. This is the first Game Freak title to release on PlayStation 5 and Xbox Series X/S, and also their first title to be available on Xbox Game Pass immediately upon launch. In PlayStation's State of Play February 2026, Fictions confirmed that the game will launch on August 4, 2026.

== Reception ==
Reception

Aggregate scores
Aggregator	Score
Metacritic	(PC) 71/100 (PS5) 71/100 (XSXS) 75/100
OpenCritic	55% recommend (Note: Based on 66 reviews)

Review scores
Publication	Score
Destructoid	7/10
Eurogamer	3/5
Game Informer	6/10
GameSpot	6/10
GamesRadar+	4.5/5
Giant Bomb	3.5/5
Hardcore Gamer	3.5/5
IGN	6/10
PC Gamer (US)	73/100
PCGamesN	8/10
Push Square	7/10
RPGamer	3.5/5
RPGFan	70/100
Shacknews	8/10
The Guardian	3/5
Video Games Chronicle	3/5

Beast of Reincarnation received "mixed or average" reviews for the Windows and PlayStation 5 versions, while the Xbox Series X/S version received "generally favorable" reviews, according to review aggregator website Metacritic. On 13 August, Game Freak apologized for "not providing a sufficiently enjoyable experience", and said they would continue working on the game.

Andrej Barovic reviewed the game for Destructoid, saying, "Beast of Reincarnation tries too many things at once and, as expected in such cases, fails at most of them. An incredible combat system and some of my favorite boss fights of all time are overshadowed by inconsistencies in level design, difficulty, and storytelling, leaving Game Freak's foray into Soulslikes as Blighted as its protagonist, though there is still a lot here for people to enjoy."

Writing for Eurogamer, Matt Wales said in his mixed review, "Game Freak borrows liberally from the genre's biggest hits. And while it's messy and muddled, it's salvaged by exhilarating combat and traversal, and a surprising amount of soul."

Jake Dekker of GameSpot also gave the game a mixed review, praising it for its fascinating world, flashy combat and the main protagonist's companion, while criticizing its incredibly dull cast of character with uninteresting dialogue, reused bosses and lack of polish. He awarded it a final score of six out of ten.

Luke Kemp reviewed the game for GamesRadar, saying, "Beast of Reincarnation is a great ARPG, with firm but fair combat and wide scope for crafting a build to your tastes. Surprisingly, perhaps, it also has a deep and thoughtful story that it trusts you to dig into yourself. Let Game Freak henceforth be known as the Beast of Reincarnation studio."

Shawn McDowell said in his review for Giant Bomb, "I ended up enjoying Beast of Reincarnation more than I thought I would from the game’s initial slow, basic impression, but it never truly sunk its claws into me. This feels like the result of Game Freak’s designers having something to say (or at least wishing they did), but constantly struggling to find the right words. It eventually becomes a very fun action RPG to play, but stumbles many, many times on the path of getting there."

Adam Beck's closing comments for his review for Hardcore Gamer said, "Beast of Reincarnation is an engaging, highly addictive experience with a lot to explore, but it comes with some issues. For starters, the plot is as lifeless as the characters and the environmental design is seriously lacking. In addition, while bosses are enjoyable and become a lot more challenging, most of them only have a handful of repeating attacks with middling second phases. With that said, the combat is fantastic, especially for those who enjoy parrying, and the amount of variety with Koo helps immensely. The world also has quite a bit to explore and there are good progression systems along with RPG elements. The end result is an adventure that doesn’t quite hit the mark on every occasion, but enough to make it worthwhile.

Writing for IGN, Travis Northup said, "Beast of Reincarnation is an action RPG that has some great ideas blossoming here and there, but they can be hard to spot among the weeds.".

Shaun Prescott's PC Gamer review summary said, "It's not perfect, but this parry-centric scrapper has a distinctive mood and often excellent combat."

Writing for PCGamesN, Quinn Collins said in his review, "Despite a slow start, Beast of Reincarnation provides a hardcore post-apocalyptic JRPG experience wrapped in a well-woven narrative of memory and connection set to a stellar soundtrack and great art design."

Stephen Taliby reviewed the game for Push Square, saying, "Beast of Reincarnation is an interesting action RPG that ties together various elements to present something quite unique. While the narrative isn't particularly enthralling and it suffers from some visual and technical issues, the combat is a highlight, focusing on parries and a mix of melee and pseudo-turn-based commands that feels fun to balance. It wears its influences on its sleeve, but there are just enough fresh ideas that mean it stands apart."

The closing comments of Donovan Erskine's review for Shacknews said, "Beast of Reincarnation is a fun action-adventure game, primarily thanks to a robust combat system that kept me experimenting throughout my playthrough. I was also quite charmed by Koo and his relationship with Emma; it’s an area where you can really see Game Freak’s Pokemon DNA shining through. The exploration elements don’t come together, but I plan on coming back to Beast of Reincarnation when I want to slash my way through robots and monsters."

Dave Aubrey said in his review for Video Games Chronicle, "Game Freak's Beast of Reincarnation might be the best non-Pokémon game the studio has ever made. Combat is weighty and satisfying, and there’s heart at its core. The story and especially the lore of the world can fall flat, but the relationship between Emma and the game’s small cast will keep you playing. It’s not the best action game of 2026 by any means, but it’s one that deserves to have its ideas fully fleshed out in a sequel."
