= Yoshitaka Murayama =

Japanese video game designer (1969–2024)

- 村山 吉隆
- Born: 1969; Hokkaido, Japan
- Died: 6 February 2024 (aged 55)
- Occupations: Game designer, director and producer
- Website: www.bm.ai

Yoshitaka Murayama (村山 吉隆, Murayama Yoshitaka; 1969 – 6 February 2024) was a Japanese game designer, game director and game producer. He was best known for his career at Konami, where he created the Suikoden series of role-playing video games, for which he produced and directed major installments until his departure in 2002 before the release of Suikoden III. He is also widely known as the creator of Eiyuden series, developed by Rabbit & Bear Studios and published by 505 Games.

Murayama died on 6 February 2024 at the age of 55, due to complications from an ongoing illness.

== Biography ==
=== Konami ===
After finishing his computer programming studies at University of Tokyo in the summer of 1992, Murayama visited Konami's newly opened Tokyo headquarters to submit his first job application whereupon he was hired. Initially hired for QA and menial tasks, he was handpicked six months later along with a few others to create his own launch game for an internally developed video game console, where he began collaborating with designer Junko Kawano, also a newcomer to Konami and future writer and designer for Suikoden IV and Tactics. This game was scrapped in the early stages of development & despite popular belief, was not the basis for the script of Suikoden. Murayama, Kawano and ten other employees were instead assigned with developing Konami's first games for Sony's upcoming console, the PlayStation. With the pick of making a baseball game, a racing game or an RPG, Murayama and Kawano decided to reopen their RPG project, although Murayama has stated that given the opportunity, he would have preferred to make a shoot 'em up, citing his preference for arcade action titles such as Taito's Metal Black.

Committed from the start to make a franchise to rival series such as Enix's Dragon Quest and Square's Final Fantasy, Murayama wrote the scenario of the first Suikoden. Unimpressed with their early 3D polygon tests, he made a traditional 2D RPG using sprite graphics. In the winter of 1993, when pitching his idea of an RPG with a great gallery of supporting characters, inspired by Murayama's preference for manga such as Fist of the North Star and Captain Tsubasa he instead decided to use the classic Chinese novel Shui Hu Zhuan in order to better illustrate his point to his boss, who was around 50 years old and assumed to be unfamiliar with these manga. The pitch was a success, and in this short meeting the game was given the name Suikoden, the Japanese reading of Shui Hu Zhuan, and Murayama was tasked with making 108 characters mirroring the 108 outlaws in the Chinese classic.

Suikoden was released in Japan in 1995 to positive reviews and an initial lackluster response from the market. However sales increased when word of mouth started spreading and a cult following was formed. Murayama personally responded to each and every fan letter that was sent. Konami was also intent on making Suikoden into a franchise, and he was asked to develop its sequel, bringing back most of the team from the first game. By then, it was well known that Square was developing Final Fantasy VII for the PlayStation, and Murayama and his team were sure from the start that their game would not be able to stand up commercially to Square's RPG. Deciding what aspects to focus on for Suikoden II, response from the fans prompted them to concentrate on further developing the world and its characters over the graphics and mechanics. The game was released in December 1998, like its predecessor to positive reviews and slow but steady sales.

A third game in the series was developed, but a month before the release of Suikoden III in July 2002, Murayama left Konami. In compliance with Konami's company policy, his name was taken out of the credits for the game. In an interview with Swedish gaming magazine LEVEL in August 2009, Murayama clarified that he left Konami because it had been exactly ten years since he first joined the company, and his personal goal had always been to stay no longer than ten years before turning freelance. He claims that after the success of Suikoden II, his superiors were very supportive and that he was allowed to decide freely how the next Suikoden would be made, and that he is still on good terms with the old team. Soon after leaving Konami, Murayama set up his own company, Blue Moon Studio, the developer of the video game 10,000 Bullets (Tsukiyo ni Saraba in Japan).

=== 2010s ===
In January 2010, Murayama posted an update on the Blue Moon Studio blog, indicating that he has received an unspecified offer from another company. One of Murayama's projects during the 2010s was a manga adaptation of Laura Resnick's Magic: The Gathering novel The Purifying Fire with artwork by Yoshino Himori.

=== Rabbit & Bear Studios ===
Yoshitaka Murayama worked with Junko Kawano and other contributors to the Suikoden franchise for a new project which echoes its legacy: Eiyuden Chronicle: Hundred Heroes. The game was announced on 27 July 2020 and launched a successful Kickstarter campaign, making its base funding requirements in just over 3 hours. It exceeded all of its original stretch goals and was released on 23 April 2024. Its predecessor, Eiyuden Chronicle: Rising, was released on 10 May 2022.

== Game design philosophy ==
Murayama stated that he often preferred the supporting characters over the main character, in the case of manga such as Saint Seiya and Captain Tsubasa, and whereas the protagonist keeps the plot moving forward, it is the supporting characters that are usually the most memorable.

Inspired by a line of code in Enix's 1992 RPG Dragon Quest V where each time the player is killed and resurrected, the dialog from the priest character is slowed down a little, Murayama wanted to use small details such as this to give his games a greater sense of realism and emotional depth. While levelling out the skill curves of many characters in order to push the player not to use the same characters exclusively, this type of coding was implemented in order to try to invoke different emotions, such as the case of forcing the player to use a character that's been recently nerfed in order to irritate the player, only to have that character killed moments later to give the player guilty conscience.

== Works ==
Game	Role	Releases	Platform
Suikoden	Producer, writer, director	1995	PlayStation
Suikoden II	Producer, writer, director	1998	PlayStation
Suikogaiden Vol. 1: Swordsman of Harmonia	Writer	2000	PlayStation
Suikogaiden Vol. 2: Duel at Crystal Valley	Writer	2001	PlayStation
Suikoden Card Stories	System programmer	2001	Game Boy Advance
Suikoden III	Producer, writer, director	2002	PlayStation 2
10,000 Bullets	Producer, writer, director	2005	PlayStation 2
Tensho Gakuen Gekkoroku	Writer	2006	PlayStation 2
The Alliance Alive	Scenario	2017	Nintendo 3DS
Eiyuden Chronicle: Rising	Supervisor	2022	Microsoft Windows, Xbox One, Xbox Series X/S, PlayStation 4, PlayStation 5, Nintendo Switch
Eiyuden Chronicle: Hundred Heroes	Game designer, scenario	2024	Microsoft Windows, Xbox One, Xbox Series X/S, PlayStation 4, PlayStation 5, Nintendo Switch
