= Finishing Move Inc. =

Video game music production team

- Genres: Electronic, soundtrack, classical, pop
- Occupations: Composer, producer, musician, sound designer
- Instruments: Guitar, bass, piano, percussion, sampling, programming
- Labels: Xbox Game Studios, Sumthing Else, 343 Industries, Laced Records
- Members: Brian Lee White; Brian Trifon; Jay Wiltzen; Alex Klingle
- Website: finishingmoveinc.com

Finishing Move Inc. are a video game music production and composer team formed by Brian Trifon and Brian Lee White. The duo has composed soundtracks for several video game titles, including The Callisto Protocol, Grounded, Borderlands 3, Microsoft Flight Simulator, Crackdown 3, Halo Wars 2, Massive Chalice, and Doom: The Dark Ages.

They won Best Original Instrumental for Halo 2 Anniversary at the 2015 Game Audio Network Guild (G.A.N.G.) Awards and were nominated that same year in the following categories: Music of the Year, Best Original Soundtrack Album, Best Original Vocal Song Pop, and Best Audio Mix.

In 2017, they were nominated for The Hollywood Music in Media Awards for Original Score - Video Game for their work on Halo Wars 2. The real-time strategy video game also got Trifon and White nominations for Best Interactive Score, Best Cinematic Cutscene Audio, and Best Audio Mix at the G.A.N.G. Awards in 2018.

In 2019, they were nominated for The Hollywood Music in Media Awards for Original Score - Video Game for their work on Borderlands 3.

== Credits ==
Year	Title	Notes	Ref.
2014	Halo: The Master Chief Collection	Adapted and orchestrated score originally composed by Martin O'Donnell and Michael Salvatori	
2015	Massive Chalice		
2017	Halo Wars 2	Composed with Gordy Haab	
2019	Crackdown 3		
2019	Borderlands 3	Composed with Jesper Kyd, Michael McCann and Raison Varner	
2020	Microsoft Flight Simulator		
2022	Grounded	Composed with Justin E. Bell	
2022	The Callisto Protocol		
2024	Microsoft Flight Simulator 2024		
2025	Doom: The Dark Ages		
2025	Grounded 2		
2025	Borderlands 4	Composed with Cris Velasco, Joshua Michael Carro, Christian Pacaud, Casey Di lorio	
2026	Doom: The Dark Ages Revelations		

== Awards and nominations ==
Year	Award	Title	Category	Result	Ref.
2015	Game Audio Network Guild (G.A.N.G.)	Halo 2: Anniversary	Best Original Instrumental	Won	
2015	Game Audio Network Guild (G.A.N.G.)	Halo 2: Anniversary	Music of the Year	Nominated	
2015	Game Audio Network Guild (G.A.N.G.)	Halo 2: Anniversary	Best Original Soundtrack Album	Nominated	
2015	Game Audio Network Guild (G.A.N.G.)	Halo 2: Anniversary	Best Original Vocal Song Pop	Nominated	
2015	Game Audio Network Guild (G.A.N.G.)	Halo 2: Anniversary	Best Audio Mix	Nominated	
2017	Hollywood Music In Media Awards	Halo Wars 2	Original Score - Video Game	Nominated	
2018	Game Audio Network Guild (G.A.N.G.)	Halo Wars 2	Best Interactive Score	Nominated	
2018	Game Audio Network Guild (G.A.N.G.)	Halo Wars 2	Best Cinematic Cutscene Audio	Nominated	
2018	Game Audio Network Guild (G.A.N.G.)	Halo Wars 2	Best Audio Mix	Nominated	
2019	Hollywood Music In Media Awards	Borderlands 3	Original Score - Video Game	Nominated	
2019	Broadcast Production Awards	Drumline Trap	Production Music Album - Sports	Won	
2020	Game Audio Network Guild (G.A.N.G.)	Borderlands 3	Best Audio Mix	Nominated	
2020	Game Audio Network Guild (G.A.N.G.)	Borderlands 3	Audio of the Year	Nominated	
2020	Game Audio Network Guild (G.A.N.G.)	Borderlands 3	Music of the Year	Nominated	
2020	Game Audio Network Guild (G.A.N.G.)	Borderlands 3	Best Interactive Score	Nominated	
2020	Game Audio Network Guild (G.A.N.G.)	Borderlands 3	Best Game Music Cover/ Remix	Nominated	
2025	World Soundtrack Awards (WSA)	DOOM: The Dark Ages	WSA Game Music Award	Nominated	
2025	NYX Game Awards	DOOM: The Dark Ages	Original Game Soundtrack Gold Award	Won	
2025	Grand Game Awards	DOOM: The Dark Ages - From the Ashes	Best OST	Nominated	
2025	Grand Game Awards	DOOM: The Dark Ages	Best Score and Music	Nominated	
2026	22nd British Academy Games Awards	DOOM: The Dark Ages	Music	Longlisted	
2026	BMI Film, TV & Visual Media Awards	Borderlands 4	BMI Video Game Award	Won	
