= Frog Sqwad =

- Developer: Panic Stations
- Publisher: Panic Stations
- Platforms: Windows; Xbox Series X/S; Nintendo Switch 2; PlayStation 5
- Release: Windows, Xbox Series X/S; June 11, 2026; Nintendo Switch 2; October 28, 2026; PlayStation 5; TBA
- Mode: Multiplayer

Frog Sqwad is a cooperative platformer video game developed and published by Panic Stations. It was first announced in December 2025, and released on June 11, 2026.

== Development ==
Developer Panic Stations is based in the United Kingdom. The game was first announced at a Day of the Devs digital showcase event through a trailer on 10 December 2025. A playtest was opened on 11 December. It will be the first game released by the studio. During an Xbox Partner Preview event held in March 2026, Panic Stations announced that the game will be launched for Xbox Series X/S on the same day as Windows. It set for release on Nintendo Switch 2 on October 28, 2026, and for PlayStation 5 at an unspecified date.

== Gameplay ==
The game is a slapstick physics-based game with up to eight players. Players encounter different levels, with puzzles or challenges, to feed the "Swamp King." Successful runs results in players obtaining gold, which can be used to purchase various items.
