= Grounded 2 =

2025 video game

- Developers: Eidos-Montréal; Obsidian Entertainment
- Publisher: Bethesda Softworks (Note: Xbox Game Studios published the early access release until 2026, when Obsidian was restructured under Bethesda.)
- Directors: Chris Parker; Justin Vazquez
- Producer: Miles Winzeler
- Designers: Henri Durocher; Vincent Lavallée; Chris Ractliffe
- Artist: Natasha Bouchard
- Writer: Stéfanie Jolin
- Composer: Finishing Move Inc.
- Series: Grounded
- Engine: Unreal Engine 5
- Platforms: PlayStation 5; Windows; Xbox Series X/S
- Release: 2027: early access; Windows, Xbox Series X/S; July 29, 2025; early access; PlayStation 5; August 11, 2026
- Genres: Survival, action-adventure
- Modes: Single-player, multiplayer

Grounded 2 is a 2027 survival action-adventure video game developed by Eidos-Montréal and Obsidian Entertainment and published by Bethesda Softworks. A sequel to Grounded (2022), the game was announced during the Xbox Games Showcase in June 2025 and entered early access on July 29, 2025, for Windows and Xbox Series X/S through Steam Early Access and Xbox Game Preview, respectively. An early access version for PlayStation 5 followed on August 11, 2026, with the game's full release scheduled for 2027.

Continuing the core premise of the first game, Grounded 2 follows miniaturized teenagers who must survive in an oversized environment by gathering resources, crafting tools and equipment, building bases, and fighting insects and other creatures. The sequel is set in Brookhollow Park, a larger setting than the backyard of the original game.

== Gameplay ==
Grounded 2 is a survival game that can be played from a first-person perspective or third-person perspective. Players explore Brookhollow Park, gather materials, craft weapons, armor, and tools, and build shelters and other structures while defending themselves from hostile creatures.

As in the first game, progression is tied to improved equipment and access to new areas and resources. New features introduced in the sequel include rideable insect mounts known as "Buggies" and the "Omni-Tool", which combines multiple gathering and repair functions into a single tool. The game also adds revised movement and combat options, including dodging.

The game supports both single-player and cooperative multiplayer.

== Synopsis ==
Grounded 2 is set in 1992, two years after the events of the first game, and again follows the four original teenagers after they are shrunk. The story is set in Brookhollow Park and involves renewed activity connected to Ominent, the corporation featured in the first game.

== Development ==
Grounded 2 was co-developed by Obsidian Entertainment and Eidos-Montréal. According to the developers, rideable insect mounts were one of the most requested additions after the first game and became a major reason for developing a sequel rather than trying to retrofit the mechanic into the original.

Creative director Justin Vazquez said that the design of the mounts, known as Buggies, and the design of Brookhollow Park had to be developed together, while game director Chris Parker said balancing traversal and combat around mounted and on-foot play was a major development challenge. Obsidian also said that technical limitations influenced the decision to create a new game rather than continue expanding the first title.

== Early access ==
Announced during the Xbox Games Showcase in June 2025, Grounded 2 was released on July 29, 2025, through both Xbox Game Preview and Steam Early Access. It was also made available at launch to subscribers of Xbox Game Pass Ultimate and PC Game Pass.

The early access version includes the larger Brookhollow Park setting, Buggies, new combat options, and the Omni-Tool, with additional updates planned during development. Developers described early access as a way to gather player feedback and identify problems that could be addressed before the full release.

Post-launch updates during early access included the Hairy and Scary update in September 2025, which added the tarantula boss AXL and related equipment, Toxic Tangle in January 2026, which introduced the Garden area, the Ladybug Buggy, and new gear and creatures, Beat the Heat in April 2026, which introduced the Sinkhole Anthill area, the lizard boss King Dozer, a Black Soldier Ant Buggy, and additional progression systems, Into the Abyss in August 2026, introducing the Skunk Pond area and underwater gameplay, and the amphibious Toe Biter buggy., and Rot and Ruins in October 2026, introducing the Woodpile area, the centipede boss Skritch, a Potato Beetle Buggy, and additional quality of life update, such as base and world painting system, SCA.B 2 themes.

Within two weeks of release, the game had reached more than 3 million players. It was later nominated for Best Early Access Game at the Golden Joystick Awards in 2025.

Announced during Summer Games Fest in June 2026, Grounded 2 released in early access for PlayStation 5 on August 11, 2026, alongside the Into the Abyss update. With latest Rot and Ruin update, Obsidian announced that the game would fully release in 2027.

== Reception ==
Pre-release and early-access coverage generally described Grounded 2 as a larger and more streamlined follow-up to the first game. Critics highlighted Brookhollow Park, the Buggy system, and the Omni-Tool as notable additions to the formula.

In its review in progress, GameSpot wrote that the sequel established "a much stronger foundation for the future", while noting that some features and content from the original game were not yet present in the early-access build. PC Gamer praised the game's world design and quality-of-life changes, particularly the Omni-Tool and mounted traversal, though it also noted that the game was still in an early-access state.
