= Wo Long: Fallen Dynasty =

2023 video game

- Developer: Team Ninja
- Publisher: Koei Tecmo
- Directors: Masakazu Hirayama; Hidehiko Nakajima
- Producers: Fumihiko Yasuda; Masaaki Yamagiwa
- Designer: Masaki Yokota
- Programmer: Satoshi Kawasaki
- Artists: Kazuhiro Nishimura; Hirohisa Kaneko
- Writer: Masakazu Hirayama
- Composer: Kenichiro Suehiro
- Engine: Katana Engine
- Platforms: PlayStation 4; PlayStation 5; Windows; Xbox One; Xbox Series X/S; Nintendo Switch 2
- Release: PS4, PS5, Win, XONE, XBSX/S; March 3, 2023; Switch 2; September 3, 2026
- Genres: Action role-playing, hack and slash
- Modes: Single-player, multiplayer

Wo Long: Fallen Dynasty is a historical fantasy action role-playing video game developed by Team Ninja and published by Koei Tecmo. The game was released on March 3, 2023, on PlayStation 4, PlayStation 5, Windows, Xbox One and Xbox Series X/S. A port for Nintendo Switch 2 was released in September 3, 2026.

Set during a fictionalized version of the fall of the Han Dynasty, shortly before the Three Kingdoms period, the plot follows an unnamed protagonist who battles historical characters and Chinese mythological creatures corrupted by demonic qi. The game received generally favorable reviews with praise for its combat system and sold over 1 million units by April 2023. A sequel, Wo Long 2: Wings of Ember, is set to be released in March 2027.

== Gameplay ==
Wo Long: Fallen Dynasty is an action role-playing video game. At the beginning of the game, players can create and customize their own player avatar, and choose from one of five "phases". The game offers two options for close-range attacks. To succeed in combat, players are required to deflect attacks using their melee weapons, as this will create opportunities for them to counter an opponent's attacks. Each enemy has a "Morale rank", which indicates how challenging the combat encounter will be. More difficult enemies would drop more valuable loot. As the players perform close-ranged attacks, their spirit gauge will gradually fill. Eventually, players can unleash "spirit attacks", allowing them to use special combat moves or cast elemental spells. Players can also choose from one of five "Divine Beasts" including the Qilin, Baihu, Qinglong, Zhuque and Xuanwu. These beasts can assist players during combat, or provide passive perks to players through "Divine Beast Resonance".

Like Nioh 1 and 2, the game is largely linear. As players progress in the game, they will encounter Battle Flags scattered throughout the world. Players can use them to save their game, or use "Genuine Qi", the game's form of experience, to upgrade their characters and unlock new abilities. Unlike the first two entries in the Nioh series, Wo Long has a jump button, which further facilitates exploration and combat. The game also features a cooperative multiplayer mode, in which players can summon a friend to help during combat.

== Story ==
In 184 CE, the Yellow Turban Rebellion breaks out in China, spearheaded by the three Zhang brothers, who are using a powerful Elixir given to them by a mysterious Taoist named Yu Ji to overthrow the ruling Han dynasty. During a rebel raid on a rural village, the unnamed protagonist, who serves as a soldier for a local militia, rescues a blindfolded boy from some rebels. Both escape from the village using the Boy's magic but are stopped by one of the Zhang brothers, Zhang Liang, whom the protagonist kills in battle. With Liang's death, Yu Ji appears and captures the Boy, who is revealed to be an embodiment of the dragon deity Yinglong(应龙). The Taoist takes control of the dragon and escapes. Seeking to liberate the captured spirit, the protagonist resolves to track down the other two Zhang brothers to find Yu Ji.

While roaming the nearby mountains, the protagonist joins forces with another militiaman called Zhao Yun. The pair confront the second rebel leader, Zhang Bao, and rescue Hong Jing, a young sorceress who has been searching for her lost brother. Later, after parting ways with Yun, the protagonist and Hong Jing meet the three famous oath brothers Liu Bei, Guan Yu and Zhang Fei, who help them find and kill Bao. Through the oath brothers, the protagonist comes into the service of Cao Cao and Sun Jian, two Han army generals tasked with putting down the rebellion. Cao's forces find the final rebel leader, Zhang Jiao, in a fort built out of a desecrated temple and the protagonist slays him after he uses the Elixir to turn into a demon. Afterwards, the protagonist and Hong Jing travel to her home village in the mountains, where they rescue her mentor, Zuo Ci, from a demon and, using his divination magic, they learn that the Yellow Turban leaders were conspiring with Zhang Rang, a eunuch minister who hoped to cause chaos in the country as a pretext to concentrate more power on himself. The protagonist, Cao and his friend, Yuan Shao, infiltrate the eunuch's palace to assassinate him. The trio fight Rang, who uses dark magic to clone himself and attack as a mob. Close to death, the eunuch flees, only to be killed by one of his allies, Dong Zhuo, who then steals his Elixir.

Using the Elixir and demons summoned by Yu Ji, Dong Zhuo raises an army and captures the Imperial Capital, taking the Emperor hostage. Yuan Shao and Cao Cao put together a coalition of various provincial ministers and military officers to march against Dong, battling his forces in Hulaoguan. During the battle, the protagonist fights against Dong's right hand-man, Lu Bu, but fails to kill him. After catching a brief glimpse of him at the end of the fight, Hong Jing recognizes Lu as her lost brother. As the coalition army reaches the Capital, Dong retreats to his fortress in Meiwu and burns the capital down. Having driven Dong out of the capital, most of the coalition's members abandon their mission as they consider Dong to no longer be a threat, much to the dismay of Yuan Shao, who believes Dong still hasn't been punished for his crimes. Making matters worse, Yu Ji's manipulation of events results in Sun Jian's Elixir-induced transformation and untimely death at the hand of the Protagonist, causing his sons Sun Ce and Sun Quan to swear vengeance.

Later, Hong Jing infiltrates Dong's fortress dressed as a dancer named Diao Chan, both to help the protagonist sneak in and to make contact with her brother to learn why he's joined the tyrannical Dong. The protagonist duels Dong in his throne room, wounding him so badly that he retreats and tries to use the Elixir to turn Hong Jing into a demon as a last-ditch defense, only to be stabbed in the back by Lu for threatening his sister.

Lu allows his sister and the protagonist to leave Meiwu alive, but then takes possession of the Elixir and marshals Dong's former army to go to war against Cao's government troops. Lu and Cao's armies battle across several provinces but, despite being forced to retreat multiple times, Lu never uses the Elixir. After his army is cornered by Cao's in Xiapi, Lu is approached by Yu Ji, who questions why he hasn't used the Elixir and offers him more. Lu attacks the Taoist and reveals his aim was to lure him out so that he could kill him to put an end to the chaos he's been causing. However, Yu Ji turns the tables on him and uses the Elixir to turn him into a demon just as the protagonist and Hong Jing arrive to his command center. The duo are forced to kill the transformed Lu Bu to stop his rampage, much to Hong Jing's grief.

Due to the failure of the coalition and Yu Ji's influence, Yuan has come to believe that Cao wished to take power for himself, so he plans to steal the Elixir in his own bid for power. As Cao's army prepares to package the Elixir and take it back to the Capital for safekeeping, an army commanded by Yuan Shao mounts a surprise assault and forces them to retreat, with Yuan taking the Elixir and capturing Liu Bei. Shortly after, Sun Ce is killed by Yu Ji near Guandu. The protagonist, Guan Yu and Zhang Fei mount a mission to rescue Liu Bei from Yuan, even turning him back to human after Yuan uses Yu Ji's dark magic to turn him into a demon. After Liu Bei is rescued, Cao leads his armies into a decisive battle against Yuan in Guandu. Cornered in his castle's main hall, Yuan uses the elixir to turn into a demon and battles the protagonist and Cao, but he's ultimately defeated. With his dying words, Yuan apologizes to Cao for his betrayal, which Cao accepts and bids his former friend goodbye.

After his last puppet is bested, Yu Ji attacks the protagonist personally and reveals his aim is to use the chaos of war to create a demon of pure dark magic so he can command it to take control of the country for himself. After he's fatally wounded, Yu Ji sacrifices his physical body to turn into the ultimate demon, but the protagonist is able to slay it, returning dragon Yinglong back to his human form as the Blindfolded Boy. The protagonist takes the comatose Boy back to the village where they found him in the hopes of its magic reawakening him. However, when the Boy awakens, he's been possessed by Yu Ji, who now has full access to Yinglong's power. Despite this advantage, the Protagonist is still able to beat him and release the Boy from his control, after which Yinglong's spirit destroys Yu Ji once and for all.

With peace restored, the protagonist takes the Boy to Hong Jing's hidden mountain village to live in tranquility. Years later, the protagonist and Hong Jing prepare to set out on a journey once more as Zuo Ci has felt the Elixir being used for dark magic again. The Boy, now revealed to be Zhuge Liang, bids them goodbye with a smile but, after they leave, he frowns and sees visions of war between the Three Kingdoms which will be founded by Cao Cao, Liu Bei and Sun Quan.

== Development ==
On October 26, 2021, during a development stream celebrating the 40th anniversary of Koei Tecmo president and CEO Kou Shibusawa's career, it was announced that Team Ninja were currently developing a new action game based on Luo Guanzhong's 14th-century historical novel Romance of the Three Kingdoms. The game was formally revealed on June 12, 2022, at the Xbox & Bethesda Games Showcase 2022 event for release on Windows, Xbox One and Xbox Series X/S, with PlayStation 4 and PlayStation 5 versions being announced shortly after.

Development of Wo Long: Fallen Dynasty began around two years before its reveal. The project is being led by Team Ninja president Fumihiko Yasuda (who directed 2017's Nioh as well as its 2020 follow-up) and producer Masaaki Yamagiwa (best known for his work on Tokyo Jungle and Bloodborne), who joined Team Ninja in mid-2021 following his exit from Sony's now-defunct Japan Studio several months prior. Like Nioh, Wo Long: Fallen Dynasty takes place during real-life historical events, but is embellished with prominent supernatural elements taken from folklore and mythology. Wo Long: Fallen Dynasty was developed using Koei Tecmo's in-house engine called "Katana Engine".

In October 2022, it was announced that the game will be released on March 3, 2023.

== Reception ==
Reception

Aggregate score
Aggregator	Score
Metacritic	(PC) 79/100 (PS5) 80/100 (XSXS) 79/100

Review scores
Publication	Score
Destructoid	9/10
Digital Trends	4/5
Famitsu	36/40
Game Informer	8.75/10
GameSpot	8/10
GamesRadar+	4/5
Hardcore Gamer	4.5/5
IGN	8/10
NME	3/5
PC Gamer (US)	89/100
PCGamesN	8/10
Push Square	9/10
RPGFan	86/100
Shacknews	9/10
Video Games Chronicle	3/5
VG247	4/5

Wo Long: Fallen Dynasty received "generally positive" reviews, according to review aggregator website Metacritic. In Japan, four critics from Famitsu gave the game a total score of 36 out of 40, with each critic awarding the game a 9 out of 10.

Polygon enjoyed the morale system, writing that it was "an inventive spin on the Soulslike formula, as it indicates how challenging a particular match will likely be from afar — without you having to die multiple, needless deaths by plunging headfirst into random encounters". Rock Paper Shotgun liked how it made Nioh's overwhelmed complexity manageable, "Wo Long untangles a lot of Nioh's woes, streamlining things to make the act of ticking off missions not only a joy, but a joy that doesn't threaten entire brain collapse". Eurogamer praised the setting, but criticized the overgenerous loot system, seeing it as a "leftover" from Nioh. The PC port was criticized for its poor performance and broken mouse controls.

Sales

The PlayStation 5 version of Wo Long: Fallen Dynasty was the second bestselling retail game during its first week of release in Japan, with 30,132 physical copies being sold. The PlayStation 4 version was the sixteenth bestselling retail game in Japan throughout the same week, selling 17,699 physical copies.

The game sold over 1 million units by April 2023.

== Sequel ==
A sequel, Wo Long 2: Wings of Ember, was announced by Koei Tecmo and Team Ninja at the Xbox Games Showcase in June 2026. It is scheduled for release on March 4, 2027 for PlayStation 5, Xbox Series X and Series S, Nintendo Switch 2, and Windows.
