= FragPunk =

2025 first-person shooter video game

- Developer: Bad Guitar Studio
- Publisher: NetEase
- Engine: Unreal Engine
- Platforms: Windows; PlayStation 5; Xbox Series X/S
- Release: Windows; March 6, 2025; PS5, XSX/S; April 29, 2025
- Genres: First-person shooter; Hero shooter
- Mode: Multiplayer

FragPunk is a 2025 first-person hero shooter video game developed by Bad Guitar Studio and published by NetEase. The game was released for Windows on March 6, 2025, and PlayStation 5 and Xbox Series X/S on April 29, 2025.

The game is free-to-play and follows the live service game model. It features a shard card system, hero shooter and tactical shooter gameplay. Each player assumes control of an attacker or a defender in the main mode, Shard Clash. FragPunk has no campaign and features a custom mode that can be played solo.

== Gameplay ==
FragPunk is an online multiplayer tactical hero shooter game featuring 2 teams of five players using characters with distinctive abilities, called "Lancers". Two opposing teams, defenders and attackers compete in the main game mode "Shard Clash" to plant or defuse the Converter at a target site. During the preparation phase of each round, players can contribute shard points to purchase Shard Cards. Each team is given a selection of 3 cards randomly chosen from the unlocked cards of all teammates. Every Shard Card has a total cost that must be reached by the total contributions of a team for it to take effect that round. Each card has an effect that remains active for the round. FragPunk had 169 cards on its release. Most of the cards need to be unlocked during gameplay process and level-up.

The game features a variety of weapon types, including shotgun, submachine gun, assault rifle, light machine gun, marksman weapon, sniper rifle, pistol, utility gun, Dagger. Weapons are also divided into 3 classes: Primary Weapons, Secondary Weapons, Melee Weapons. At launch, FragPunk featured 7 maps, 13 playable characters and 7 main modes. In addition to the core modes (Shard Clash and Shard Clash Ranked), players can also access Arcade Modes, which include Outbreak, Team Deathmatch, Duel Master, Capture The Core, and Scrimmage.

=== Chapters and Seasons ===
Each new season is intended to bring with it the release of a new playable character and other new content such as new maps, new weapons and new modes. Seasons are further broken down into chapters, each chapter also includes a free, premium, and ultimate battlepass.

Season 1 Chapter 1 started on March 6, 2025 with the release of new playable character Chum and new map Dongtian. After that, Season 1 Chapter 2 began, releasing another new character, Dex.

Title	Season	Chapter	Start	Description
Wild Dawn	1	1	March 6, 2025	Wild Dawn introduced a new playable character known as Chum and new map Dongtian as well as lots of bugfixes and gameplay improvements, including movement changes.
Wild Dawn	1	2	April 25, 2025	Wild Dawn: Chapter 2 added a new character, Dex, a new deathmatch map, Aesir, and a new Headshot Only mode.

== Development and release ==
FragPunk was developed by Bad Guitar Studio. The game was created with "punk" style to emphasize character designs.

A closed alpha was run from June 28 to July 2024, and a closed beta was run later in the year from October 10 to 21. The game was then released worldwide on March 6, 2025, for Windows on Steam and Epic Games Store. Versions for the PlayStation 5 and Xbox Series X/S consoles were also expected to be released the same day, but were delayed to a later date shortly before release due to "unexpected technical challenges in optimization and adaptation." The delay was initially reported to be until March 7, but Bad Guitar stated its goal was to have the game ready for a console release "within the next two months". Once the game releases onto console platforms, it is set to be cross-play.

== Reception ==
Reception

Aggregate scores
Aggregator	Score
Metacritic	74/100
OpenCritic	56% recommend

Review scores
Publication	Score
IGN	7/10
PC Gamer (US)	83/100
Shacknews	6/10

The game received "generally favorable" reviews according to review aggregator Metacritic. OpenCritic determined that 56% of critics recommended it.

Lauren Bergin of PCGamesN noted that players were critical of the game's in-game transaction system, writing that "its nine different currencies and costly microtransactions have left players frustrated", citing negative Steam reviews, as well as the game's "mixed" 67% rating at launch. A sentiment that was shared by Justin Koreis of IGN. PC Gamer's writer Echo Apsey agreed too, but praised the game for being "one of the most creative and refreshing competitive shooters in years". Regarding the gameplay, Bergin opined, "what I loved about FragPunk was the fast-paced, Valorant-esque action. This is day one, however, so hopefully Bad Guitar rolls back the movement changes to be more reflective of the beta". Stacey Henley of TheGamer compared FragPunk's PVP deckbuilding concept to the 2023 indie game Friends vs Friends, writing that "If you are absolutely loving FragPunk, then that's easy - keep playing FragPunk [...] but, as I suspect some people will find, if you think FragPunk is only okay and wish it did more with the card gimmick, Friends vs Friends is the friend you need and a friend indeed".

=== Player count ===
2 days after its launch, FragPunk surpassed a peak of 100 thousand concurrent users.
