= Crazy Taxi: World Tour =

- Developer: Sega
- Publisher: Sega
- Producer: Kenji Kanno
- Series: Crazy Taxi
- Engine: Unreal Engine
- Platforms: Nintendo Switch 2; PlayStation 5; Windows; Xbox Series X/S
- Release: 2027
- Genre: Racing
- Modes: Single-player, multiplayer

Crazy Taxi: World Tour is an upcoming racing video game developed and published by Sega. It is fourth main installment of the Crazy Taxi franchise. The game is set to release in early 2027 for Nintendo Switch 2, PlayStation 5, Windows, and Xbox Series X and Series S.

== Gameplay ==
Crazy Taxi: World Tour is set to feature a single-player story campaign spread across five cities, in addition to the game's traditional arcade mode and various multiplayer modes. San Francisco Bay Area, Germany, Japan, India and Brazil are the five five confirmed locations. Each location is further separated into various zones. Many campaign missions require players to transport passengers under specific conditions, though players can also choose to pick up random passengers in the game world and deliver them within a time limit. While driving, players can perform various tricks such as boosting and drifting. Each city is designed as an open world for players to explore, where they can pick up side jobs and complete minigames and skill tests.

Two multiplayer modes are confirmed: Pickup Race, which supports up to six players and tasks them with dropping off as many passengers as possible within a time limit, and Cops ‘N’ Cabbies, which tasks a team of police officers with chasing down another team playing as taxi drivers.

== Plot ==
Axel, the series' returning protagonist, must embark on a globe-trotting adventure to retrieve his stolen taxi from a group of international car thieves.

== Development and marketing ==
Sega greenlit World Tour as part of an attempt to revive dormant franchises. Kenji Kanno, the game's producer, added that the goal for the development team was to "recreate the original Crazy Taxi in a new form" while evolving and modernizing its gameplay. There is also a greater emphasis on the game's narrative, with the team attempting to further flesh out character backstories. Despite calling the title a "massively multiplayer driving game" in 2024, Kanno added in 2026 that World Tour was designed primarily as a single-player game, though a multiplayer option was included for "hardcore players" and those who want to spend more time with the game after finishing its campaign.

In 2023, Sega teased the release of a new and untitled Crazy Taxi game at The Game Awards. In May 2026, Sega dropped a teaser of a flickering taxi light across their social media platforms, which sparked speculation. The following month, Sega released the official trailer for Crazy Taxi: World Tour with an early 2027 release date. Upon the announcement, fans discovered that the Steam page had a disclaimer regarding the use of generative AI, which Sega later confirmed was used to produce unspecified background elements. Series creator Kenji Kanno elaborated that AI was used to create concept art for artists to reference and claimed that generative AI was not used elsewhere. A closed network test of the game was held from September 11 to September 13, 2026.
