= Doom: The Dark Ages =

2025 video game

- Developer: id Software
- Publisher: Bethesda Softworks
- Director: Hugo Martin
- Artist: Emerson Tung
- Composer: Finishing Move Inc.
- Series: Doom
- Engine: id Tech 8
- Platforms: PlayStation 5; Windows; Xbox Series X/S
- Release: May 15, 2025
- Genre: First-person shooter
- Mode: Single-player

Doom: The Dark Ages is a 2025 first-person shooter game developed by id Software and published by Bethesda Softworks. It is the eighth main entry in the Doom franchise, following Doom Eternal (2020). A prequel to Doom (2016), it follows the Doom Slayer's efforts to combat a demonic invasion of the planet Argent D'Nur.

id Software began work on Doom: The Dark Ages following the completion of Doom Eternal's post-launch campaign, The Ancient Gods, in 2021, entering full production by August 2022. The game was announced in June 2024, and was released on PlayStation 5, Windows, and Xbox Series X/S on May 15, 2025, to positive reviews from critics, who praised the game's combat systems and setting. An expansion pack, subtitled Revelations, was released on July 7, 2026.

== Gameplay ==
First-person perspective of the Doom Slayer wielding his Super Shotgun and Shield Saw while facing off against demons

While previous entries in the Doom series, such as Doom (2016) and Doom Eternal (2020), focused on fast-paced, acrobatic combat, Doom: The Dark Ages shifts towards a heavier, more grounded combat experience, emphasizing strategic engagements. The Doom Slayer is portrayed as an "iron tank", equipped with enhanced melee options and a slow-motion "glory kill" feature for improved control during combat. The introduction of the Shield Saw allows for blocking, parrying, and attacking within a single input. New weapons include the Skull Crusher, which fires bone fragments. Melee weapons such as a gauntlet, an iron mace, and a flail, are available. The Dark Ages is the first Doom game to allow players to pilot vehicles, like a cybernetic dragon and a 30-story Atlan mech, to combat enemies during certain sections. The narrative places a greater emphasis on storytelling, with more cutscenes and character development, providing a deeper insight into the Doom Slayer's origins. Doom: The Dark Ages is a single-player-only game, featuring no multiplayer like previous entries.

== Plot ==
=== Main campaign ===
At some point following his arrival on the planet Argent D'Nur and his subsequent empowerment, (Note: As depicted in Doom Eternal's (2020) flashbacks) the Doom Slayer is weaponized by the alien Maykrs to assist Argent D'Nur's people, the Night Sentinels, in their war against the forces of Hell, who seek an object known as the Heart of Argent; the Slayer does not fight completely of his own free will, however, as his master, Kreed Maykr, suppresses him with a device called a Tether. Meanwhile, the leader of the demons, Prince Ahzrak, realizes it is not worth fighting the Slayer directly and focuses his efforts on finding the Heart.

Ahzrak finds the hiding place of the Heart, but the Slayer and King Novik manage to thwart him. However, Novik decides to keep the Heart with himself, not fully trusting the Slayer or the Maykrs. Ahzrak attacks the retreating Sentinel forces. Kreed refuses to deploy the Slayer to help them, intending to keep himself protected. Unwilling to let innocents die, the Slayer is able to break free of the Tether's control, forcing Kreed to send him back into battle, where he successfully holds off the demons long enough for the Sentinels to escape. Ahzrak is able to steal the Heart from Novik but finds it empty and useless. Ahzrak offers an alliance to Kreed, who himself has come to fear the Slayer turning on him. The Slayer attempts to remove the Tether from his armor with little success. Novik's daughter, Commander Thira, tasks him with finding the Heart's power source before Ahzrak does.

Thira invokes an ancient ritual to empower the Slayer's shield, and he assaults Ahzrak's fortress in Hell. Meanwhile, Kreed betrays the Sentinels by sending a recording of Thira's ritual to Ahzrak, who realizes that Thira is actually the Heart's power source, and orders her capture. Failing to find Ahzrak, the Slayer returns to Argent D'Nur only to see Thira and Kreed being taken by demons. In order to follow them, the Slayer reawakens an ancient being, known as an Old One, and follows it back to its homeworld, the Cosmic Realm. However, Kreed betrays the Slayer and Ahzrak overpowers him. Ahzrak reveals Thira houses the soul of a Wraith, who are descendants of the Cosmic Realm, and extracts it to power the Heart. Instead of following Kreed's advice to kill the Slayer since the latter cannot permanently die, Ahzrak instead leaves him imprisoned by the Old Ones while he leads the final assault against the Sentinels.

The Slayer self-destructs the Tether in his armor, killing himself. His soul is sent to Hell, where he fights his way back to the mortal plane as Commander Valen resurrects him with a demonic ritual. The Slayer kills Kreed, then confronts Ahzrak once again, defeating him and freeing Thira's soul. Ahzrak flees back to Hell, with the Slayer and Thira in pursuit. The Slayer kills Ahzrak, causing his forces to retreat. Afterwards, the Maykrs disavow Kreed's actions while Novik and Valen plan to purge any remaining traitors in their midst. Thira rallies the Sentinels, bidding them not to put their faith in the Maykrs, but in themselves instead. Meanwhile, the Slayer commandeers Kreed's ship to continue his crusade against Hell.

=== Revelations ===
The Slayer confronts Hell's High Council, but they use the Slayer's deep-seated guilt to weaken him, and he is defeated by their champion, the Henchman, and banished to a purgatory beneath their chamber. In the purgatory, the Slayer is found by the Architect, who nurses him back to health and repairs his weapons and shield. The Architect instructs the Slayer to collect three Ascension Stones that will cleanse his soul and allow him to escape. The stones reveal the source of the Slayer's guilt: back on Earth, when he was a MARSOC operative, the Slayer destroyed an enemy bunker beneath a hospital, but killed a young girl in the process by mistake; codex logs also reveal the Slayer assaulted his superior officer over the incident, as he was under the impression the hospital was devoid of civilians, leading to him being court-martialed and sent to perform grunt duty on Phobos. (Note: As referenced in the manual for Doom (1993))

The Slayer acquires a replica of Novik's axe, through which he sees Novik being killed by Valen's son, Marok—appointed as the champion of the Maykrs' leader, the Khan Maykr, who secretly allied with Hell and convinced them to stop attacking Argent D'Nur in return for betraying the Slayer. Marok arrives at the purgatory and destroys the Slayer's exit portal; the Slayer defeats Marok, who kills himself before his Tether can reassert control. The Architect turns the stones into a power source for the Slayer's new armor, the Praetor Suit—the suit that the Slayer would use in his later battles against Hell; (Note: As depicted in Doom (2016) and Doom Eternal) the Praetor Suit reactivates the portal. The Slayer returns to Argent D'Nur, finding its populace on the brink of a civil war between Maykr loyalists and those who distrust them. He gives the replica to Thira; upon touching it, Thira sees her father's death and orders her forces to rebel against the Maykrs. The Khan Maykr retreats with the Night Sentinels still loyal to her, and summons the Henchman; the Slayer kills the Henchman, and Thira declares war on the Maykrs. In a post-credits scene, unlocked via completing all postgame content, Valen is tormented by demonic whispers; Thira arrives and offers him the axe replica.

== Development ==
After the release of Doom Eternal's second downloadable content (DLC) campaign The Ancient Gods - Part 2 in March 2021, creative director Hugo Martin mentioned that he was open to exploring more stories with the series protagonist Doom Slayer in future games, despite intending for The Ancient Gods to act as a culmination for the character's arc that began with Doom (2016). One possibility he expressed was telling a narrative around the Slayer's first encounter with the Night Sentinels on Argent D'Nur, in a setting that was more rooted in fantasy aesthetics compared to previous games. By November 2021, id Software had begun pre-production on a new action first-person shooter game. During QuakeCon 2022, executive producer Marty Stratton confirmed that the developer had begun production on their next project.

In September 2023, numerous documents submitted by ZeniMax Media parent company Microsoft during the FTC v. Microsoft court case concerning their impending acquisition of Activision Blizzard were leaked online. Included was an internal roadmap concerning multiple Bethesda Softworks games in development. A new Doom entry, Doom: Year Zero, was listed for release during Bethesda's 2023 fiscal year ending March 2024 at that time, with two sets of downloadable content (DLC) tentatively dated for the 2023 fiscal year and the 2024 fiscal year ending March 2025, respectively. Doom: The Dark Ages uses the id Tech 8 engine and features advanced game physics, which includes destructible environments.

After the acrimonious split between Doom Eternal composer Mick Gordon and id, music for The Dark Ages was handled by Finishing Move Inc.; the Revelations DLC also featured Whitechapel's Phil Bozeman on vocals.

== Release ==
In September 2020, following Doom Eternal's launch, Microsoft entered an agreement to acquire Bethesda's parent company, ZeniMax Media, for $7.5 billion, gaining ownership over all of Bethesda's associated development teams and franchises, including id Software and the Doom license, now as part of Microsoft Gaming. Doom: The Dark Ages was announced at Microsoft's Xbox Games Showcase event on June 9, 2024, where it was confirmed for release on Windows and Xbox Series X/S in 2025. Following the presentation, a PlayStation 5 version was announced as launching day and date with the other platforms. On the decision to not pursue exclusivity, Phil Spencer explained that the Doom series' history on other platforms made it a series he felt "everyone deserves to play."

Doom: The Dark Ages was launched on May 15, 2025, though it provided an advanced access period to pre-order purchasers. Buyers of a GeForce 50 series graphics card of the RTX 5070 and above models were able to receive a free copy of Doom: The Dark Ages until May 21, 2025. In addition, Asus partnered with Bethesda Softworks and id Software to offer a limited edition RTX 5080 ROG Astral graphics card in a Doom: The Dark Ages design. An expansion, titled Revelations, was released on July 7, 2026.

== Reception ==
Reception

Aggregate scores
Aggregator	Score
Metacritic	(PC) 85/100 (PS5) 83/100 (XSXS) 85/100
OpenCritic	95% recommend

Review scores
Publication	Score
Destructoid	9.5/10
Digital Trends	3.5/5
Eurogamer	4/5
Famitsu	35/40
Game Informer	9.5/10
GameSpot	8/10
GamesRadar+	3.5/5
Hardcore Gamer	5/5
IGN	9/10
PC Gamer (US)	80/100
PCGamesN	8/10
Push Square	8/10
Shacknews	9/10
The Guardian	4/5
Video Games Chronicle	4/5
VG247	4/5
VideoGamer.com	8/10

Doom: The Dark Ages received "generally favorable" reviews from critics, according to review aggregator website Metacritic. OpenCritic determined that 95% of critics recommended it.

Reviewers praised the innovative combat mechanics and atmospheric setting. Mitchell Saltzman of IGN wrote that while it "may strip away the mobility focus of Doom Eternal", it "replaces it with a very weighty and powerful style of play that is different from anything the series has done before, and still immensely satisfying in its own way". Marcus Stewart from Game Informer described it as "modern Doom executed better than ever", and highlighting the "bloody, challenging, and strategic thrill ride" that tested his skills and kept him engaged. Alessandro Barbosa of GameSpot said it "reinvents and reins in with equal measure, taking the series in a bold new direction without straying from its captivating roots". Morgan Park of PC Gamer called it "indulgent and deliciously violent, but surprisingly safe".

Jade King from TheGamer criticized The Dark Ages as "the weakest entry in a fantastic trilogy", stating that despite its additions to combat and exploration, she would prefer an experience that took more risks and sought to reinvent what it means to play a Doom game. Vulture wrote that The Dark Ages just "feels recursive", suggesting that despite its attempts at innovation, it remains too tethered to its predecessors without expanding the vocabulary of its violence. The Washington Post found that while it introduces a refined first-person action gameplay with a shield-based combat system, it suffers from the absence of signature "glory kills" and a less impactful score.

=== Player count ===
Doom: The Dark Ages reached 3 million players in its first week, seven times faster than Doom Eternal, making it the biggest launch in id Software's history; however, it was also the first Doom game to be released on Xbox Game Pass at launch.

=== Awards ===
Year	Award	Category	Result	Ref.
2025	The Game Awards 2025	Best Action Game	Nominated	
2025	The Game Awards 2025	Innovation in Accessibility	Won	
2026	The Steam Awards 2025	Outstanding Visual Style	Nominated	
2026	29th Annual D.I.C.E. Awards	Action Game of the Year	Nominated	
2026	29th Annual D.I.C.E. Awards	Outstanding Technical Achievement	Nominated	
2026	24th Game Audio Network Guild Awards	Best Audio Mix	Nominated	
2026	22nd British Academy Games Awards	Music	Longlisted	
2026	22nd British Academy Games Awards	Technical Achievement	Nominated	
2026	24th Visual Effects Society Awards	Outstanding Visual Arts in a Real-Time Project	Nominated	
2026	Develop:Star Awards 2026	Best Audio	Nominated	
2026	Develop:Star Awards 2026	Best Technical Innovation	Nominated	
2026	Develop:Star Awards 2026	Best In-Game Accessibility	Won	
2026	44th Golden Joystick Awards	Best Game Expansion (Revelations)	Won	
