= Super Meat Boy 3D =

2026 video game

- Developers: Team Meat; Sluggerfly
- Publisher: Headup Games
- Artist: Lala Fuchs
- Composers: Ridiculon; Matthias Bossi; Jon Evans; (Note: Matthias Bossi and Jon Evans aren't credited in the credits of the videogame.)
- Engine: Unreal Engine 5
- Platforms: Nintendo Switch 2; PlayStation 5; Windows; Xbox Series X/S
- Release: March 31, 2026
- Genre: Platform
- Mode: Single-player

Super Meat Boy 3D is a 2026 platform video game developed by Team Meat and Sluggerfly and published by Headup Games. The third main installment in the Super Meat Boy series, it was released for the Nintendo Switch 2, PlayStation 5, Windows and Xbox Series X/S on March 31, 2026.

== Gameplay ==
Meat Boy jumping over toxic waste

Super Meat Boy 3D is a 3D platformer in which players control a small, dark red, cube-shaped character named Meat Boy, who must save his cube-shaped, heavily bandaged girlfriend Bandage Girl from the evil scientist Dr. Fetus. The game adapts the gameplay of Super Meat Boy, bringing its precision platforming into a 3D environment. Players attempt to reach the end of each level while avoiding enemies, circular saw blades, industrial shredders and various other obstacles. Meat Boy does not have any health; any contact with dangerous obstacles kills him instantly. Upon death, the player instantly respawns at the beginning of the level. The player can jump and run on platforms, and can jump off, slide down or run on walls. Additionally, a mid-air dash can be performed, allowing the player to extend jumps and break certain platforms. Dark world is set to return from Super Meat Boy, which houses harder versions of regular levels. The game also features bosses. After a level is completed, all the player's attempts to complete the level are shown simultaneously. Most levels contains a collectible bandage in hidden or hard-to-reach areas.

== Development and release ==
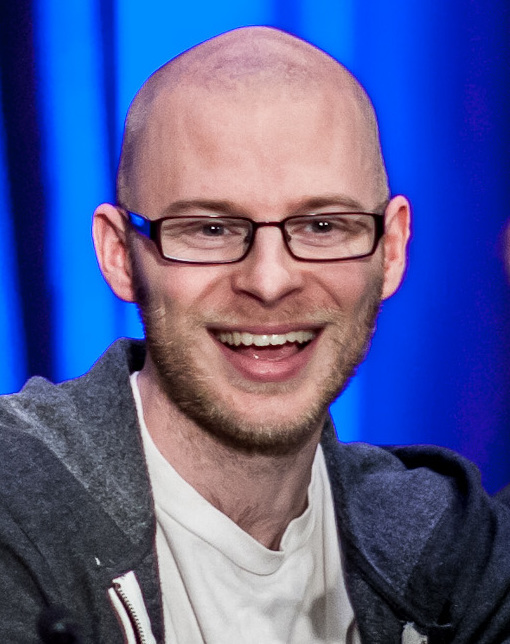
Refenes in 2012

In an interview with Creative Bloq, Sluggerfly co-founder and art director Dominik Plassmann stated that the publisher was approached by the Super Meat Boy co-creator Tommy Refenes to make a 3D prototype in six months to "test all these different approaches and see if it even works". The prototype was originally an open world with a collectathon-style progression before being changed into a linear level structure with a fixed camera inspired by Super Mario 3D World. Sluggerfly chose the Unreal Engine 5 as the engine for the game, with Plassmann stating that "The first game had a super iconic stylized look, but [they] also want to modernise it a bit, so [there is] a lot of visual detail in some areas of the game". Plassmann also stated in the gameplay trailer that Sluggerfly have "worked closely with Team Meat" to ensure that Meat Boy controls "just right in 3D" which resulted in the addition of horizontal wall running and a mid-air dash.

Super Meat Boy 3D was first announced on June 8, 2025, during the Xbox Summer Showcase at Summer Game Fest 2025. Upon the release of the trailer, various news outlets welcomed Meat Boy's transition to 3D, calling the game's artstyle faithful and noting the lack of auto-running introduced in Super Meat Boy Forever to a mixed reception. On June 11, IGN released additional gameplay footage. In June, publisher Headup Games announced that a playable demo of the game would be playable at Gamescom 2025 in Cologne. A gameplay trailer was published on July 24.

A Nintendo Switch 2 version of the game was announced by the game's publisher, Headup, on February 27, 2026. It was released on March 31, 2026. The game became available on Xbox Game Pass upon release.

== Reception ==
Reception

Aggregate scores
Aggregator	Score
Metacritic	(NS2) 73/100 (PC) 75/100 (PS5) 63/100 (XSXS) 78/100
OpenCritic	71% recommend (Note: Based on 69 reviews)

Review scores
Publication	Score
Hardcore Gamer	4/5
IGN	8/10
Nintendo Life	8/10
Nintendo World Report	7/10
Shacknews	7/10

Super Meat Boy 3D received "mixed or average" reviews for the Nintendo Switch 2 and PlayStation 5 versions while the Windows and Xbox Series X versions received "generally favorable" reviews, according to review aggregator website Metacritic. Fellow review aggregator OpenCritic assessed that the game received strong approval, being recommended by 71% of critics.

Polygon called the transition to 3D "sloppy", opining that the game "chooses to play it safe," while Digital Spy rated the game 4/10, stating that the imprecise depth perception may cause unfair deaths, calling the level design "forgettable" and concluding that Super Meat Boy 3D "doesn't understand what made the original enjoyable." In contrast, IGN rated the game 8/10, arguing that the series' precision platforming has transitioned well into 3D, though noting that the fixed perspective can at times be detrimental to the player. Hardcore Gamer gave the game a 4 out of 5, lauding the level variety and controls, though boss levels were criticized due to their emphasis on memorization.
