= The Last Case of Benedict Fox =

- Developer: Plot Twist
- Publisher: Rogue Games
- Engine: Unity
- Platforms: Windows; Xbox One; Xbox Series X/S
- Release: WW: April 27, 2023
- Genre: Metroidvania
- Mode: Single-player

The Last Case of Benedict Fox is a Metroidvania video game developed by Plot Twist and published by Rogue Games.

== Gameplay ==
Players control Benedict Fox, a detective joined to a demon. Fox tracks down his father, who turns out to be dead. Using his demonic familiar, Fox enters another dimension where he seeks answers about his father's death. Players must solve puzzles, jump to platforms, and fight Lovecraftian monsters.

== Development ==
Developer Plot Twist is based in Kraków, Poland. Rogue Games released The Last Case of Benedict Fox for Windows, Xbox One, and Xbox Series X/S on April 27, 2023. A definitive edition announce for PlayStation 5, featuring fixes the issues from patch, Better UI, Graphical enchantment and improve the AI.

== Reception ==
The Last Case of Benedict Fox received mixed reviews on Metacritic. PC Gamer wrote, "Intriguing puzzles aside, this Metroidvania is plagued with systems that seem designed to frustrate." IGN called it "disappointingly uneven" and "just as likely to engage as it is to enrage". Though they praised the art and puzzles, Game Informer said that its "fundamentals struggle to match its vision". GameSpot enjoyed the lore and art, but they also criticized what the felt were "mediocre combat and platforming mechanics".
