= Ravenlok =

- Official Poster
- Developer: Cococucumber
- Publisher: Cococucumber
- Director: Vanessa Chia
- Producer: Vanessa Chia
- Programmers: Martin Gauvreau (Lead); Justin San Juan
- Artists: Edgar Abrego (Animator); Danielle Magpayo; Simone Heath; Vicky Liang; Leona Wu
- Writer: Vanessa Chia
- Composers: Mike Lizola Rocha; Eggplant Music and Sound
- Platforms: Microsoft Windows; Xbox One; Xbox Series X/S
- Release: May 4, 2023
- Genre: Action role-playing
- Mode: Single-player

Ravenlok is an indie action role-playing game developed and published by Canadian studio Cococucumber and released for Windows, Xbox One, and Xbox Series X/S on May 4, 2023. The game follows a young girl named Ravenlok, who finds herself pulled away from reality and into a fantasy land cursed by an evil Caterpillar queen.

== Gameplay ==
Ravenlok is an action role-playing game that combines voxel tech with pixel art. The game features a third-person perspective, in which players battle enemies using a sword and shield combo.

Weeping-Fungi Boss from Ravenlok

Gameplay features include arena-based boss fights, a leveling system where players can hunt for new weapons and items to level up their skills, and quests where players can interact with secondary characters and uncover their stories.

== Plot ==
Ravenlok is a fairytale reimagining a young girl and her quest to fulfill a dangerous prophecy. The game follows Kira, whose family has moved into a new home in the countryside, after inheriting the estate from a missing relative. While investigating her new home, Kira falls through a mirror into a magical realm called Dunia, where she takes up the mantle of Ravenlok and embarks on a journey. The developers have disclosed that the real-world home of Ravenlok is set in an unspecified place in rural Canada.

Screenshot from Ravenlok

The game draws inspiration from Alice's Adventures in Wonderland, with the protagonist being pulled through a mirror into a fantasy world. But unlike modern adaptations of the novel, the story does not appear to include its heavy subject material, such as mental illness. Secondary characters and enemies include knights made of cards, a Queen of Hearts, a white rabbit, court jesters, playing-card guardsmen, and robotic versions of Tweedledum and Tweedledee.

== Development ==
Ravenlok was announced and a trailer was revealed at the Xbox and Bethesda Games Showcase in 2022. The initial trailer earned praise for its unique art style, which blends voxel-based character designs and non-voxel 3D assets. The trailer references classic elements of Lewis Carroll's Alice's Adventures in Wonderland, with both the storyline and character designs reminiscent of Carroll's famous works. Ravenlok's early footage has also drawn comparisons to 2000's American McGee's Alice, another third-person action-adventure game and modern retelling of Alice in Wonderland.

Ravenlok is the third and final installment in Cococucumber's Voxel Trilogy, following the releases of Riverbond and Echo Generation. Ravenlok has been described as the culmination of their studio's exploration into the 3D pixel aesthetic. Prior to Ravenlok's partnerships with Microsoft and Xbox, Echo Generation received positive online attention from both Microsoft Gaming CEO, Phil Spencer, and Xbox corporate Vice President, Sarah Bond, on Twitter.

The Cococucumber team has spoken of leaning into themes of family, and identity and finding your home in the structure of a coming-of-age story, while incorporating elements of different fantasy stories. Additional inspiration was found in exploring the idea of Asian identity. While not explicitly mentioned, the protagonist comes from an Asian family.

Ravenlok game director Vanessa Chia told Epic Games Store that "the works of Studio Ghibli are a wonderful source of inspiration, especially My Neighbor Totoro, Kiki's Delivery Service and Spirited Away". The Cococucumber team have expressed that the game references a number of fantasy stories, such as Labyrinth, The Lord of the Rings series, The Neverending Story, and Over the Garden Wall. Chia said that while the comparison to American McGee's take on Alice in Wonderland is interesting, American McGee's Alice, it is more of a reflection for the appetite for a new game from the auteur developer.

The Cococucumber team have spoken about aiming to make an action role-playing game that builds upon their previous works' gameplay elements, specifically the turn-based combat in Echo Generation and Riverbond's dungeon crawling and arcade elements.

== Release ==
Ravenlok was released for Windows, Xbox One, and Xbox Series X/S on May 4, 2023.

== Reception ==
Ravenlok received "mixed to generally favorable reviews" for Xbox Series X/S upon release, according to review aggregator Metacritic. The game has been particularly praised for its art direction and atmosphere, pacing, and the incorporated Alice in Wonderland iconography. PC Gamer described it as an "absolute treat", with every environment being "packed with detail rendered in unfiltered textures" and "packed full of voxelized decoration and lit impeccably".

Game Rant's Dalton Cooper rated the game 4/5 stars, stating that, while Ravenlok may not be for players looking to "invest hundreds of hours into their games", it's a "short, sweet, easy game" that is "perfect to pick up and play", or as a "good starter game for kids". He praised the story for "never losing momentum" and being "consistently entertaining from start to finish", but stated that a hindrance is that the "camera can be overly restrictive at times."
