= Eiyuden Chronicle: Hundred Heroes =

2024 video game

- Developers: Rabbit and Bear Studios
- Publisher: 505 Games
- Director: Osamu Komuta
- Producer: Junichi Murakami
- Designer: Junko Kawano
- Artists: Junko Kawano; Junichi Murakami
- Writer: Yoshitaka Murayama
- Composers: Motoi Sakuraba; Michiko Naruke
- Engine: Unity
- Platforms: Nintendo Switch; PlayStation 4; PlayStation 5; Windows; Xbox One; Xbox Series X/S
- Release: April 23, 2024
- Genre: Role-playing
- Mode: Single-player

Eiyuden Chronicle: Hundred Heroes is a 2024 role-playing video game developed by Rabbit and Bear Studios and published by 505 Games. It has been called a spiritual successor of lead developer Yoshitaka Murayama's previous series, Suikoden, which he made for Konami.

== Development and release ==
The development of Eiyuden Chronicle: Hundred Heroes was led by Yoshitaka Murayama, the creator of the Suikoden video game series by Konami. Murayama had directed Suikoden I and II during his time at Konami, but resigned from Konami in 2002, shortly before the release of series third installment, Suikoden III.

The fundraising campaign for the Eiyuden Chronicle project was conducted through the crowdfunding platform Kickstarter. The campaign exceeded all of the original stretch goals and met its base funding requirements after surpassing $500,000 within 3 to 4 hours on July 27, 2020. It ultimately raised $4,541,481 with 46,307 backers, making it the third highest funded video game in Kickstarter history behind Shenmue III and Bloodstained: Ritual of the Night.

Hundred Heroes was featured at E3 2021 for Nintendo Switch, PlayStation 4, PlayStation 5, Windows, Xbox One and Xbox Series X/S, and was originally slated to be released worldwide in October 2022 before being delayed due to the COVID-19 pandemic. The game was then set for a 2023 release, but was delayed to 2024. It was later confirmed to release on April 23, during their presentation on the September 2023 Nintendo Direct. A prologue, Eiyuden Chronicle: Rising, was released for the same platforms in May 2022.

== Reception ==
Reception

Aggregate score
Aggregator	Score
Metacritic	PC: 79/100; XSX: 76/100; PS5: 75/100

Review score
Publication	Score
Famitsu	33/40

Eiyuden Chronicle: Hundred Heroes received "generally favorable reviews" on Windows, Xbox Series X and PlayStation 5, according to review aggregator website Metacritic. In Japan, four critics from Famitsu gave the game a total score of 33 out of 40.

Game Informer awarded it an 8/10, saying "archaic structures makes those first impressions tough to look past, but a creative battle system, extensive party customization, and top-notch writing make up for the retro jank." Game Informer however criticized the gameplay for being outdated at certain points, such as having an empty open world and some tedious dungeons to go through.

Godisageek praised the game, saying that "Eiyuden Chronicle: Hundred Heroes is a truly memorable experience that absolutely will stick with you when it's over." IGN Japan gave the game a 90/100.

On a more mixed review, PCGamesN said that "whether or not you're a fan of Suikoden II, Eiyuden Chronicle: Hundred Heroes is just about worth your time. Unfortunately, almost every high point in Nowa's adventure is met with a painful low, making for a disjointed experience bursting with forgettable minigames and characters."
