= Wo Long 2: Wings of Ember =

Upcoming video game

- Developer: Team Ninja
- Publisher: Koei Tecmo
- Series: Wo Long
- Platforms: Nintendo Switch 2; PlayStation 5; Windows; Xbox Series X/S
- Release: March 4, 2027
- Genre: Action role-playing
- Mode: Single-player

Wo Long 2: Wings of Ember is an upcoming action role-playing game developed by Team Ninja and published by Koei Tecmo. It is a sequel to Wo Long: Fallen Dynasty (2023). It is scheduled for release in early 2027 for Nintendo Switch 2, PlayStation 5, Windows, and Xbox Series X/S.

== Gameplay ==
Wo Long 2: Wings of Ember is an action role-playing game set in a dark fantasy version of the Three Kingdoms period of Chinese history. The player controls a nameless champion who fights humans and demons across battlefields inspired by the late Eastern Han dynasty. The game builds on the Chinese martial arts based combat of Wo Long: Fallen Dynasty, with an evolved system involving both offensive and defensive techniques. At launch, the game features six weapon classes, with each having its own unique moveset. Players must parry an opponent's attack to drain their stamina. A successful parry opens up opportunities for counterattacks. In addition, levels are more open than those in its predecessor, allowing players to explore for optional content.

== Story ==
The game is set after the events of Wo Long: Fallen Dynasty during a fantasy interpretation of the late Eastern Han period, as warlords compete for power and figures associated with the Three Kingdoms emerge. The story involves wars fought over the pursuit of an elixir of immortality and a protagonist empowered by the phoenix.

== Development and release ==
In February 2024, Koei Tecmo revealed that the studio had "no plans" for a Wo Long sequel, though the team expressed interest in a new game based on the Three Kingdoms era. Wo Long 2: Wings of Ember was announced during the Xbox Games Showcase on June 7, 2026. The game is scheduled to launch worldwide on March 4, 2027, for Windows, Nintendo Switch 2, PlayStation 5, and Xbox Series X and Series S. It is also planned to be available through Xbox Game Pass at launch. A demo for the game was released in September 2026.
