= List of Prime Matter games =

Prime Matter is a division of Plaion that publishes video games. It was established in 2021 and, according to reports in May 2023, will eventually be phased out in favor of the Plaion brand.

== List of video games ==
Title	Platform(s)	Release date	Developer(s)	Ref.
King's Bounty II	Microsoft Windows	August 24, 2021	1C Entertainment	
King's Bounty II	Nintendo Switch	August 24, 2021	1C Entertainment	
King's Bounty II	PlayStation 4	August 24, 2021	1C Entertainment	
King's Bounty II	Xbox One	August 24, 2021	1C Entertainment	
Encased	Microsoft Windows	September 7, 2021	Dark Crystal Games	
Encased	GeForce Now	September 7, 2021	Dark Crystal Games	
Phoenix Point: Behemoth Edition	PlayStation 4	October 1, 2021	Snapshot Games	
Phoenix Point: Behemoth Edition	Xbox One	October 1, 2021	Snapshot Games	
Wasteland 3: Cult of the Holy Detonation	Linux	October 5, 2021	InXile Entertainment	
Wasteland 3: Cult of the Holy Detonation	Macintosh	October 5, 2021	InXile Entertainment	
Wasteland 3: Cult of the Holy Detonation	Microsoft Windows	October 5, 2021	InXile Entertainment	
Wasteland 3: Cult of the Holy Detonation	PlayStation 4	October 5, 2021	InXile Entertainment	
Wasteland 3: Cult of the Holy Detonation	Xbox One	October 5, 2021	InXile Entertainment	
Iron Harvest: Complete Edition	PlayStation 5	October 26, 2021	King Art Games	
Iron Harvest: Complete Edition	Xbox Series X/S	October 26, 2021	King Art Games	
Phoenix Point: Behemoth Edition	PlayStation 5	December 9, 2021	Snapshot Games	
Phoenix Point: Behemoth Edition	Xbox Series X/S	December 9, 2021	Snapshot Games	
Pathfinder: Wrath of the Righteous - Inevitable Excess	Microsoft Windows	February 15, 2022	Owlcat Games	
Phoenix Point: Behemoth Edition - Kaos Engines	PlayStation 4	March 1, 2022	Snapshot Games / Saber Minsk	
Phoenix Point: Behemoth Edition - Kaos Engines	PlayStation 5	March 1, 2022	Snapshot Games / Saber Minsk	
Phoenix Point: Behemoth Edition - Kaos Engines	Xbox One	March 1, 2022	Snapshot Games / Saber Minsk	
Phoenix Point: Behemoth Edition - Kaos Engines	Xbox Series X/S	March 1, 2022	Snapshot Games / Saber Minsk	
Outward: Definitive Edition	PlayStation 5	May 15, 2022	Nine Dots Studio	
Outward: Definitive Edition	Xbox Series X/S	May 15, 2022	Nine Dots Studio	
Dolmen (video game)	Microsoft Windows	May 20, 2022	Massive Work Studio	
Dolmen (video game)	PlayStation 4	May 20, 2022	Massive Work Studio	
Dolmen (video game)	PlayStation 5	May 20, 2022	Massive Work Studio	
Dolmen (video game)	Xbox One	May 20, 2022	Massive Work Studio	
Dolmen (video game)	Xbox Series X/S	May 20, 2022	Massive Work Studio	
Pathfinder: Wrath of the Righteous – The Treasure of the Midnight Isles	Microsoft Windows	August 30, 2022	Owlcat Games	
Pathfinder: Wrath of the Righteous – Enhanced Edition	Nintendo Switch	September 29, 2022	Owlcat Games	
Pathfinder: Wrath of the Righteous – Enhanced Edition	PlayStation 4	September 29, 2022	Owlcat Games	
Pathfinder: Wrath of the Righteous – Enhanced Edition	Xbox One	September 29, 2022	Owlcat Games	
The Last Oricru	Microsoft Windows	October 13, 2022	GoldKnights	
The Last Oricru	PlayStation 5	October 13, 2022	GoldKnights	
The Last Oricru	Xbox Series X/S	October 13, 2022	GoldKnights	
Mount & Blade II: Bannerlord	PlayStation 4	October 25, 2022	TaleWorlds Entertainment	
Mount & Blade II: Bannerlord	PlayStation 5	October 25, 2022	TaleWorlds Entertainment	
Mount & Blade II: Bannerlord	Xbox One	October 25, 2022	TaleWorlds Entertainment	
Mount & Blade II: Bannerlord	Xbox Series X/S	October 25, 2022	TaleWorlds Entertainment	
The Chant	Microsoft Windows	November 3, 2022	Brass Token	
The Chant	PlayStation 5	November 3, 2022	Brass Token	
The Chant	Xbox Series X/S	November 3, 2022	Brass Token	
Gungrave G.O.R.E.	Microsoft Windows	November 22, 2022	Iggymob	
Gungrave G.O.R.E.	PlayStation 4	November 22, 2022	Iggymob	
Gungrave G.O.R.E.	PlayStation 5	November 22, 2022	Iggymob	
Gungrave G.O.R.E.	Xbox One	November 22, 2022	Iggymob	
Gungrave G.O.R.E.	Xbox Series X/S	November 22, 2022	Iggymob	
Crossfire: Legion	Microsoft Windows	December 8, 2022	Blackbird Interactive	
Mato Anomalies	Microsoft Windows	2023	Arrowiz Games	
Mato Anomalies	Nintendo Switch	2023	Arrowiz Games	
Mato Anomalies	PlayStation 4	2023	Arrowiz Games	
Mato Anomalies	PlayStation 5	2023	Arrowiz Games	
Mato Anomalies	Xbox One	2023	Arrowiz Games	
Mato Anomalies	Xbox Series X/S	2023	Arrowiz Games	
Payday 3	Microsoft Windows	2023	Overkill Software	
Payday 3	PlayStation 5	2023	Overkill Software	
Payday 3	Xbox Series X/S	2023	Overkill Software	
Scars Above	Microsoft Windows	2023	Mad Head Games	
Scars Above	PlayStation 5	2023	Mad Head Games	
Scars Above	Xbox Series X/S	2023	Mad Head Games	
System Shock	Linux	2023	Nightdive Studios	
System Shock	Macintosh	2023	Nightdive Studios	
System Shock	Microsoft Windows	2023	Nightdive Studios	
System Shock	PlayStation 4	2023	Nightdive Studios	
System Shock	Xbox One	2023	Nightdive Studios	
Echoes of the End	Microsoft Windows	2025	Myrkur Games	
Final Form	Microsoft Windows	TBA	Reikon Games	
Final Form	PlayStation 5	TBA	Reikon Games	
Final Form	Xbox Series X/S	TBA	Reikon Games	
Kingdom Come: Deliverance	Nintendo Switch	TBA	Saber Interactive	
Painkiller	TBA	TBA	Saber Interactive	
