= Summer Game Fest =

Live video game event

- Status: Active
- Genre: Video games; Interactive entertainment
- Frequency: Annually
- Locations: Los Angeles, California
- Country: United States
- Years active: 2020–present
- Inaugurated: May 1, 2020; 6 years ago
- Most recent: June 5, 2026; 5 months ago
- Organizer: Geoff Keighley
- Website: summergamefest.com

Summer Game Fest is a live video game event organized and hosted by game journalist Geoff Keighley. The event takes place annually over multiple live streams during the North American summer period, the most notable of which is the "main show" which usually airs on the first day of the event and showcases upcoming major releases. The "main show" is usually then followed by multiple streams over the next few days from other publishers or groups, such as an Xbox Game Studios showcase or "Day of the Devs" featuring several indie games.

While Keighley had been involved in events associated with E3, one of the game industry's prominent events, he had expressed concern and dissatisfaction with the direction the Entertainment Software Association (ESA) had planned for the event in 2020, and withdrew from participation. When the COVID-19 pandemic caused the cancellation of physical events for E3 and Gamescom in 2020, Keighley established the livestreamed Summer Game Fest presentation to help replace these events. Following the ESA's decision to discontinue E3 after 2021, Summer Game Fest has become the default mid-year showcase for game announcements, and often is nicknamed as "not-E3" because of this substitution.

== List of events ==
Event name	Start date	End date
Summer Game Fest 2020	May 7, 2020	August 24, 2020
Summer Game Fest 2021	June 10, 2021	July 22, 2021
Summer Game Fest 2022	June 9, 2022	June 14, 2022
Summer Game Fest 2023	June 8, 2023	June 11, 2023
Summer Game Fest 2024	June 7, 2024	June 10, 2024
Summer Game Fest 2025	June 6, 2025	June 9, 2025
Summer Game Fest 2026	June 5, 2026	June 8, 2026

== History ==
=== 2020 ===
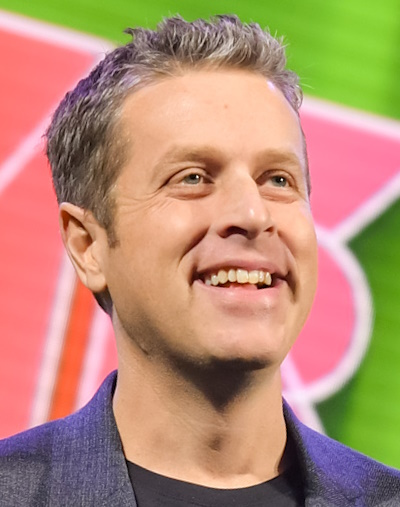
Summer Game Fest creator and host Geoff Keighley (pictured in 2018)

Games journalist Geoff Keighley had been working with the ESA since before 2000 to support the E3 convention typically held in June of each year, including running the E3 Coliseum, a side event to give developers and their games more exposure than the standard press conferences. Ahead of the planned E3 2020 show, the ESA had announced a number of changes to its approach, aiming the content of the show towards what it described as a "fan, media and influencer festival". This change of approach was criticized by some in the industry, and Sony Interactive Entertainment announced that it would not be participating in the event, after missing E3 2019, as the vision offered by the ESA did not match its expectations; Keighley also opted out of the show, noting he did not "feel comfortable participating" due to the changes.

Because of the COVID-19 pandemic, the ESA canceled the physical event for E3 in 2020. Keighley began working with numerous developers and publishers to run a four-month Summer Game Fest from May 7 to August 24, 2020, helping developers and publisher to host live streams and other events in lieu of E3 and Gamescom. Alongside Summer Game Fest, Keighley promoted the third Steam Game Festival, following The Game Awards 2019 and the previously canceled 2020 Game Developers Conference, which ran from June 16–22, 2020. Over 900 games had demos available on Steam for players to try, alongside a slate of interviews with developers throughout the period. A similar event for Xbox One games occurred from July 21–27, 2020, as part of Summer Game Fest.

Announcements made during Summer Game Fest 2020 included:

- Tony Hawk's Pro Skater 1 + 2, a remastered version of Tony Hawk's Pro Skater and its sequel for modern systems.
- The release of Unreal Engine 5, the next iteration of Epic Games' game engine, in mid-2021.
- Star Wars: Squadrons, a new game from Motive Studios and Electronic Arts featuring team-play combat using the spacecraft of the Star Wars universe like X-wing fighters and TIE fighters.
- Crash Bandicoot 4: It's About Time, a sequel to the original trilogy of Crash Bandicoot games on the original PlayStation console, being developed by Toys for Bob and Activision.
- The launch of Cuphead for the PlayStation 4.

=== 2021 ===
The second Summer Game Fest took place from June 10 to July 22, 2021, coinciding with E3 2021. From June 15–21, 2021, ID@Xbox offered a number of demos of upcoming games for the Xbox One and Xbox Series X and Series S consoles as part of Summer Game Fest.

Summer Game Fest 2021 opened with an announcement stream of games hosted by Keighley on June 10, 2021. Titles presented include:

- Among Us
- The Anacrusis
- Back 4 Blood
- Call of Duty: Warzone
- The Dark Pictures Anthology: House of Ashes
- Death Stranding Director's Cut (PS5)
- Elden Ring
- Escape from Tarkov
- Evil Dead: The Game
- Fall Guys
- Jurassic World Evolution 2
- Lost Ark
- Metal Slug Tactics
- Monster Hunter Stories 2: Wings of Ruin (NS)
- Overwatch 2
- Planet of Lana
- Salt and Sacrifice
- Solar Ash
- Tales of Arise
- Tiny Tina's Wonderlands
- Two Point Campus
- Valorant
- Vampire: The Masquerade - Bloodhunt

Summer Game Fest 2021 included the first Tribeca Games Spotlight on June 11, 2021, featuring games that had been nominated for the inaugural Tribeca Film Festival video game award. These games included:

- The Big Con
- Harold Halibut
- Kena: Bridge of Spirits
- Lost in Random
- NORCO
- Sable
- SIGNALIS
- 12 Minutes

Koch Media presented a showcase on June 11, 2021, as part of Summer Game Fest. Alongside introducing their new publishing label, Prime Matter, Koch Media's presenting covered the following games:

- The Chant
- Codename Final Form
- Crossfire: Legion
- Dolman
- Echoes of the End
- Encased
- Gungrave G.O.R.E.
- King's Bounty 2
- The Last Oricru
- Painkiller 2
- Payday 3
- Scars Above

Sony participated in the event by holding a State of Play on July 8, 2021. Announcements made during the event include:

- Arcadegeddon
- Deathloop
- Death Stranding: Director's Cut
- Demon Slayer: Kimetsu no Yaiba – The Hinokami Chronicles
- F.I.S.T.: Forged In Shadow Torch
- Hunter's Arena: Legends
- Jett: The Far Shore
- Lost Judgment
- Moss: Book II
- Sifu
- Tribes of Midgard

=== 2022 ===
The third Summer Game Fest ran throughout June 2022, with its core programming from June 9–12. Participating publishers with individual showcases included Capcom, Devolver Digital, Epic Games, Netflix, Nintendo, Sony, and Xbox.

The following titles were showcased:

- Aliens: Dark Descent
- American Arcadia
- Call of Duty: Modern Warfare II
- The Callisto Protocol
- Cuphead: The Delicious Last Course
- Fall Guys
- Flashback 2
- Fort Solis
- Goat Simulator 3
- Gotham Knights
- Highwater
- Honkai: Star Rail
- The Last of Us Part I
- Layers of Fears
- Marvel's Midnight Suns
- Metal: Hellsinger
- Midnight Fight Express
- Neon White
- Nightingale
- One Piece Odyssey
- Outriders: Worldslayer
- The Quarry
- Routine
- Stormgate
- Street Fighter 6
- Teenage Mutant Ninja Turtles: Shredder's Revenge
- Warframe: The Duviri Paradox
- Warhammer 40,000: Darktide
- Witchfire
- Zenless Zone Zero

=== 2023 ===
The fourth Summer Game Fest was a combined digital and physical event for the first time, held from June 8 to 11 2023, at the YouTube Theater in Inglewood, California; a physical component was available to the press only in 2022.

The following companies were featured:

- Activision
- Amazon Games
- Annapurna
- Bandai Namco Entertainment
- Behaviour
- Capcom
- CD Projekt RED
- Devolver Digital
- Digital Extremes
- Disney
- Electronic Arts
- Epic Games
- Focus Entertainment
- Gearbox Publishing
- Grinding Gear Games
- Hoyoverse
- Kabam
- Larian Studios
- Level Infinite
- Magic the Gathering
- Neowiz
- Netflix
- Nexon
- Niantic
- North Beach Games
- Paradox
- Pearl Abyss
- Phoenix Labs
- Plaion
- PlayStation
- Pocketpair
- Razer
- Samsung Gaming Hub
- Second Dinner
- Sega
- Smilegate
- Square Enix
- Steam
- Techland
- Tribeca Festival
- Ubisoft
- Warner Bros. Games
- Xbox

Nintendo and Konami did not participate. Nintendo instead hosted a Nintendo Direct on June 21, while Konami announced their games at the Tokyo Game Show in September.

The following titles were showcased during the main show:

- Prince of Persia: The Lost Crown
- Mortal Kombat 1
- Path of Exile 2
- Witchfire
- Crossfire: Sierra Squad
- Remnant 2
- Sonic Superstars
- Lies of P
- Sand Land
- Throne and Liberty
- Warhaven
- Party Animals
- Alan Wake 2
- Warhammer 40,000: Space Marine 2
- John Carpenter's Toxic Commando
- Baldur's Gate 3
- Spider-Man 2
- Palworld
- The Lord of the Rings: Return to Moria
- Final Fantasy VII: Ever Crisis
- Banishers: Ghosts of New Eden
- Like a Dragon Gaiden: The Man Who Erased His Name
- Under the Waves
- Fae Farm
- Marvel Snap: Conquest mode
- King Arthur: Legends Rise
- Wayfinder
- Stellaris Nexus
- Space Trash Scavenger
- Star Trek: Infinite
- Lysfanga: The Time Shift Warrior
- Immortals of Aveum
- Final Fantasy VII Rebirth

The following titles had new updates, downloadable content, or ports showcased throughout the festival.

- Exoprimal (Collab with Street Fighter 6)
- Dead by Daylight: Nicolas Cage as playable character
- Honkai: Star Rail (PlayStation 5 release)
- Yes, Your Grace: Snowfall
- Black Desert Online: Land of the Morning Light
- Call of Duty: Modern Warfare II (Season 4 content)
- Fortnite (Chapter 4 Season 3 content)

=== 2024 ===
The fifth Summer Game Fest was held at the YouTube Theater from June 7 to 10, 2024.

The following titles were showcased during the main show:

- Asgard's Wrath 2
- Batman: Arkham Shadow
- Battle Aces
- Battle Crush
- Black Myth: Wukong
- Cairn
- Civilization VII
- Crisol Theater of Idols
- Cuffbust
- Dark and Darker
- Deer and Boy
- Delta Force: Hawk Ops
- Dragon Ball: Sparking! Zero
- Dune: Awakening
- Enotria: The Last Song
- Fatal Fury: City of the Wolves
- Fear The Spotlight
- Grave Seasons
- Harry Potter: Quidditch Champions
- Honkai: Star Rail
- Hyper Light Breaker
- Killer Bean
- Kingdom Come: Deliverance II
- Kunitsu-Gami: Path of the Goddess
- Lego Horizon Adventures
- Mecha Break
- Metaphor ReFantazio
- Mighty Morphin Power Rangers: Rita's Rewind
- Monster Hunter Wilds
- Neva
- No More Room in Hell 2
- Once Human
- Party Animals
- Phantom Blade Zero
- Project C
- Skate
- Sleep Awake
- Slitterhead
- Sonic X Shadow Generations
- Star Wars Outlaws
- Tears of Metal
- The First Descendant
- The Simulation
- Unknown 9: Awakening
- Wanderstop
- Warhammer 40,000: Space Marine 2

The following titles had new updates, downloadable content, or ports showcased throughout the festival:

- Alan Wake 2: Night Springs
- Monster Hunter Stories (remaster)
- Monster Hunter Stories 2: Wings of Ruin (remaster)
- New World: Aeternum
- Palworld
- Street Fighter 6 (Year 2 content)
- The Finals (Season 3 content)
- Valorant (console release)

In addition, Innersloth, creator of Among Us, announced Outersloth, a game fund to support other indie game developers. Innersloth also showcased the upcoming animated television series based on Among Us. Again, Nintendo and Konami did not participate. Nintendo instead hosted a Nintendo Direct on June 18, while Konami announced their games at the Tokyo Game Show in September.

Following his experience at the 2024 Summer Game Fest, Diego Nicolás Argüello of Paste thought the event was in a "transitional period" and shifting towards something "more in line with what E3 used to be". He commented that "as of now, the Summer Game Fest conglomerate stands as a hybrid of sorts—a fading summer vacation with the preview commitment traditions of old. Perhaps it was naive to expect the 'chill' vibe to remain as one of the event's pillars, as it's already becoming larger than its intended place and runtime. It's clear that this ambition is deliberate. But I'm glad I caught it during this period".

=== 2025 ===
The sixth Summer Game Fest was held at the YouTube Theater on June 6, 2025, with a physical "Play Days" event taking place from June 7 to 9, 2025. Peak live viewership of Summer Game Fest increased 89% year-over-year to 50 million viewers.

The following publishers attended the event:

- 2K
- 505 Games
- Amazing Seasun Games
- Annapurna Interactive
- Bandai Namco
- Brass Lion Entertainment
- Capcom
- Coffee Stain
- Cubit Studios
- Day of the Devs
- Dotemu
- Dreamhaven
- Drinkbox Studios
- Embark
- Epic Games
- Eskil Team
- Fictions
- Focus Entertainment
- Frontier
- Funcom
- GameMill Entertainment
- IO Interactive
- Kakao Games
- Kuro Games
- Meta Quest
- Mundfish
- NC
- Netmarble
- Nexon
- Night Street Games
- PlayStack
- PlayStation
- Raw Power Games
- Sega
- Serenity Forge
- Skystone Games
- Square Enix
- Steam
- Supermassive Games
- Team Clout, Inc.
- Techland
- Tribute Games
- Xbox
- Yacht Club Games

The following titles were showcased during the main show:

- Mortal Shell II
- Death Stranding 2: On the Beach
- Chronicles: Medieval
- Sonic Racing: CrossWorlds
- Code Vein II
- End of Abyss
- Mouse: P.I. for Hire
- Game of Thrones: War for Westeros
- Atomic Heart 2
- The Cube
- Marvel Cosmic Invasion
- Onimusha: Way of the Sword
- Felt That: Boxing
- Killer Inn
- ARC Raiders
- Dune: Awakening
- Chrono Odyssey
- Mio: Memories in Orbit
- Out of Words
- Mafia: The Old Country
- LEGO Voyagers
- Nicktoons & The Dice of Destiny
- Fractured Blooms
- Blade & Soul Neo
- Blade & Soul Heroes
- The Seven Deadly Sins: Origin
- Jurassic World Evolution 3
- Mina the Hollower
- Marvel's Deadpool VR
- Dying Light: The Beast
- Mixtape
- Towa and the Guardians of the Sacred Tree
- Acts of Blood
- Scott Pilgrim EX
- Scum
- MindsEye
- LEGO Party
- Wildgate
- Blighted
- ILL
- Mecha Break
- Infinitesimals
- Last Flag
- Wuchang: Fallen Feathers
- Wu-Tang: Rise of the Deceiver
- Mongil Star Dive
- Into the Unwell
- Splitgate 2
- Stranger Than Heaven
- Resident Evil Requiem

The following titles had new updates, downloadable content, or ports showcased throughout the festival:

- Fortnite: Death Star Sabotage Event
- Wuthering Waves
- Lies of P: Overture DLC
- Street Fighter 6 (Year 3 content)
- Crystal of Atlan: One Punch Man crossover
- Hitman World of Assassination: addition of Le Chiffre from Casino Royale

Justin Carter of Gizmodo commented that "five years in, Summer Game Fest still feels like it has no real identity of its own beyond an extension of the annual year's end Game Awards" and despite wanting to be E3, it "can't be that, both because publishers have their individual, more regular showcases, and it doesn't want to be perceived as disrespectful to the medium and its audience happy to receive recognition but not the criticism that comes with it". Ash Parrish of The Verge noted there were good games shown at Summer Game Fest, however, there was "nothing big enough to anchor the show" and "as the industry faces its third straight year of rampant layoffs, cancellations, delays, and studio closures we're finally starting to see the pipeline of blockbuster games dry up". Nathan Grayson of Aftermath highlighted the juxtaposition between attending Summer Game Fest and the nearby June 2025 Los Angeles protests against mass deportation, stating "the whiplash is impossible to ignore" and "willingly or not, SGF attendees were gifted a front-row seat to authentic community action". He noted that discussions on the protests came "up organically more often than not" and that "the overriding sentiment SGF attendees feel the need to convey, as though it's a weight threatening to cave in their chests, is guilt. Multiple PR people repeatedly lament that they can't make it out into the streets because of job obligations". Parrish similarly commented that while she was "ensconced in a happy bubble" at Summer Game Fest, "the escalating conflict between demonstrators protesting against immigration raids and the Los Angeles Police Department cast a dark and soul-shaking pall that could not be ignored".

=== 2026 ===
The seventh Summer Game Fest was held from June 5 to 8, 2026, at the Dolby Theatre in Los Angeles.

The following publishers attended the event:

- Bandai Namco Entertainment
- Bloober Team
- Capcom
- CI Games
- Creative Assembly
- Dead Astronauts
- Electronic Arts
- Epic Games
- Innersloth
- Maverick Games
- NetEase Games
- NC
- Omega Force
- Paramount Game Studios
- PlatinumGames
- Pocketpair
- RGG Studio
- Sega
- Shift Up
- Smilegate
- Square Enix
- Studio MDHR
- Telltale Games
- TinyBuild
- Ubisoft
- Xbox

The following titles were showcased during the main show:

- 1666: Amsterdam
- Aion 2
- Alien: Isolation 2
- Among Us Story: On Guard
- Assassin's Creed Black Flag Resynced
- Attack on Titan 3
- Blood Message
- Chronicles: Medieval
- Clutch
- Control Resonant
- Crossfire
- End of Abyss
- Final Fantasy VII Revelation
- Gen Atlas
- Guild Wars 3
- Gundam Rogue Orbit
- Haex
- Hot Wheels Infinite Rush
- Last Harbor
- Lords of the Fallen II
- Mighty Cuphead Adventure
- Palworld
- Resident Evil Veronica
- RuneScape: Dragonwilds
- Sand: Raiders of Sophie
- Saw: Genesis
- Sea of Remnants
- Soulframe
- Star Wars: Galactic Racer
- Star Wars Zero Company
- Stellar Blade: Blood Rain
- Stranger Than Heaven
- Teenage Mutant Ninja Turtles: The Last Ronin
- The Blood of Dawnwalker
- The Wolf Among Us 2
- The Wolf Among Us Remastered
- Virtua Fighter Crossroads

The following titles were showcased during the Xbox Games Showcase on June 7, 2026.

- Bad Magpie
- Call of Duty: Modern Warfare 4
- Castlevania: Belmont's Curse
- Clockwork Revolution
- Crazy Taxi: World Tour
- Fable
- Gears of War: E-Day
- Halo: Campaign Evolved
- Join Us
- Magicians: The Devil's Deal
- Metro 2039
- Minecraft Dungeons II
- Persona 4 Revival
- Persona 6
- Resonance: A Plague Tale Legacy
- Senua
- Spyro: A Realm Beyond
- State of Decay 3
- Valor Mortis
- Vivarium
- Wo Long 2: Wings of Ember

The following titles had new updates, downloadable content, or ports showcased throughout the festival:

- 007 First Light
- Age of Empires IV
- DOOM: The Dark Ages: Revelations
- Fallout 76: Infestations
- Fortnite Battle Royale (Chapter 7: Season 3, and Shattered live event)
- Grounded 2
- Hitman: World of Assassination
- Mafia: The Old Country: Man of Honor
- Microsoft Flight Simulator 2024
- Monster Hunter Wilds: Ascendance
- Mortal Shell II
- Sea of Thieves
- Sonic Racing: CrossWorlds
- Street Fighter 6 (Year 4 content)
- The Elder Scrolls Online
- Where Winds Meet
- Wuthering Waves (Collab with Cyberpunk: Edgerunners)

PlayStation and Nintendo did not participate in the official event, instead offering a standalone State of Play on June 2 and a Nintendo Direct on June 9, respectively.

== Event types ==
=== Main show ===
The most notable and watched part of Summer Game Fest is the "main show", which is usually held on the first day of the event and is used to showcase major upcoming releases. Most of the content shown on the show is paid promotional content from major publishers, though a few "free slots" are also reserved for smaller and indie games and studios to be showcased at the show.

=== Day of the Devs ===
Double Fine Productions and iam8bit jointly held a "Day of the Devs" event as part of E3 and later Summer Game Fest to feature indie games. The stream was first incorporated at Summer Game Fest in its inaugural event in 2020 after the event which originally was a free in-person festival held in San Francisco was cancelled due to the COVID-19 pandemic in 2020, and has remained a part of the event since. With Double Fine's acquisition by Microsoft in 2019, a Day of the Devs non-profit organization was founded in 2024 to allow the event to continue with Double Fine's involvement but independent of Microsoft. The games selected to be showcased on the stream are selected following an application process that closes a couple months before the event. Developers and publishers do not have to pay any costs or fees to be featured on the stream.

== Trailers ==
Publishers and developers pay for trailers to appear during the main show. Anonymous marketing professionals claimed to Esquire that for the main show in Summer Game Fest 2024, it cost $250,000 to air a one minute trailer, with $100,000 being added to the price for each additional 30 seconds. Though a few "free slots" are also reserved at each main show for smaller and indie games and studios, Esquire estimated that at those rates the 2023 Game Awards made $9.65 million in fees to air trailers during the main show. This fee structure has attracted criticism, as it puts airing a trailer during the show mostly out of reach for smaller and independent studios who do not get a free slot.

== See also ==
- BIG Festival
- Brasil Game Show
- Consumer Electronics Show
- Gamercom
- Tokyo Game Show
