= Empulse (video game) =

2026 video game

- Developer: 1047 Games
- Publisher: 1047 Games
- Platforms: PlayStation 5, Windows, Xbox Series X/S
- Release: WW: June 24, 2026
- Genre: First person shooter
- Mode: Multi-player

Empulse is a 2026 multiplayer first person shooter game developed and published by 1047 games. It was released in early access on June 24, 2026. The game has received comparisons to the Titanfall series.

== Gameplay ==
Empulse is a 6v6 arcade shooter with an emphasis on movement and mechs. The game is heavily inspired by Respawn Entertainment's series Titanfall. Players can use wall-running, grappling hooks, and other advanced movements to traverse maps. However, in Empulse, mechs function more like power weapons and aren't dropped in by players.

The game also features a grenade-slot paint mechanic, where players can toss on surfaces to gain extra speed or jump boosts, damage/heal players, or slow them down. The paint was seemingly inspired by a mechanic in Valve's Portal 2.

== Development ==
Following the unsuccessful launch and re-launch Splitgate 2, 1047 Games shifted development focus to Empulse as its priority title.

1047 Games CEO Ian Proulx described Titanfall 2, Black Ops 3, and SSX Tricky as inspirations to the game's movement design. In response to Titanfall comparisons in publication headlines, Proulx stated "We're not trying to build Titanfall 3".

The game's early access build was developed in "about a year and a few months", according to Proulx.

On August 26, 2026, 1047 games announced Empulse will not continue active development citing a player count that was unable to financially justify continued support for dedicated servers. Peer-to-peer servers were announced to continue operating for the foreseeable future.

== Release ==
The game was unveiled and made playable as a demo for Steam Next Fest in early June 2026. Rather than using a free-to-play model like the company did with Splitgate, 1047 Games opted to make Empulse a premium $20 release. It launched without an in-game cash shop for monetization.

The game was briefly delayed from its early access release date on PlayStation 5 due to certification processing.
