= 1047 Games =

American video game developer

- Industry: Video games
- Founders: Ian Proulx; Nicholas Bagamian
- Headquarters: Zephyr Cove, Nevada, United States
- Products: Splitgate; Empulse

1047 Games is an American video game developer and publisher, known for its first-person shooter games Splitgate, Splitgate 2 and Empulse.

== History ==
1047 Games was founded by Stanford University students Ian Proulx and Nicholas Bagamian. While attending Stanford, Proulx met Bagamian in their dormitory at 1047 Campus Drive, which later inspired the company's name. The pair were both fans of the Halo series and classic arena FPS, began developing a project in their spare time. According to Proulx, the idea for the studio's first game, Splitgate, originated after he played Portal 2 and imagined combining portal-based mechanics with arena shooter combat.

According to Proulx, the concept for what would become Splitgate originated after he played Portal 2 and imagined applying portal mechanics to a competitive multiplayer shooter. Splitgate launched in early access in 2019 but remained relatively niche until 2021, when it experienced a sudden surge in popularity during its open beta phase. The rise in attention pushed 1047 Games from a small team into a venture backed studio, allowing it to expand operations and hire significantly more staff to support live service demands. $6.5 million was raised for Splitgate development in May 2021. Galaxy Interactive led the round, with participation from VGames, Lakestar, and 1Up Ventures.

Following the success of Splitgate, 1047 Games shifted toward developing a full sequel, eventually announced as Splitgate 2. Splitgate 2 launched in June 2025, but its release was quickly followed by criticism. 1047 responded by saying the game had “launched too early” and began pulling the project back into a beta-style rebuild. Staff reductions were made across the company, with the co-founders forgoing their salaries. During the same period, 1047 Games and Ian Proulx faced broader public scrutiny following a controversial promotional appearance at Summer Game Fest.

Splitgate 2 was re-revealed as Splitgate: Arena Reloaded in December 2025. The game's player engagement figures were modest relative to expectations and it faced issues rebuilding momentum after Splitgate 2’s launch.

The company followed up Splitgate: Arena Reloaded's unsuccessful relaunch with a 6v6 multiplayer FPS game Empulse, labeled as a spiritual successor to the Titanfall series. The game was released in early access release on June 24, 2026. On July 14, it was announced the company was laying off an undetermined number of staff.

In August 2026, 1047 announced they would cease development and shut down the dedicated servers for both Splitgate: Arena Reloaded and Empulse. The titles moved to peer-to-peer hosting with a server browser. The company also stated they would move away from making live service shooters.

== Games ==
Year	Title	Genre	Platform(s)	Notes
2019	Splitgate	First-person shooter	Microsoft Windows, Linux, PlayStation 4, PlayStation 5, Xbox One, Xbox Series X/S	
2025	Splitgate 2	First-person shooter	PlayStation 4, PlayStation 5, Windows, Xbox One, Xbox Series X/S	Re-released as Splitgate: Arena Reloaded
2026	Empulse	First-person shooter	PlayStation 5, Windows, Xbox Series X/S	
