= Höfen =

Höfen or Hoefen can be:

== Austria ==
- Höfen, Tyrol, a municipality in the district of Reutte in Tyrol

== Germany ==
- Höfen an der Enz, a town in the district of Calw, Baden-Württemberg
- Höfen, Gummersbach, a village in the municipality of Gummersbach, Bergisches Land, North Rhine-Westphalia
- Höfen, Monschau, a borough (former village) of Monschau, Aachen District, North Rhine-Westphalia
- Höfen, Stegaurach, a village in the municipality of Stegaurach, Bavaria
- Höfen, Meinersen, a village in the municipality of Meinersen, Lower Saxony

== Switzerland ==
- Höfen, Thun, a municipality (commune) in Thun, in Canton of Bern

== See also ==
- Hofen (disambiguation)
