= Empulse =

Empulse may refer to:

- Brammo Empulse, a brand of electric motorcycle
- Empulse (video game), a 2026 video game
