= Dolmen (disambiguation) =

A dolmen is a type of megalithic tomb, common in Europe.

Dolmen may also refer to:

- Dolmen (miniseries), a 2005 French TV miniseries
- Dolmen (typeface), a 1923 typeface, designed by Max Salzmann for the Schelter & Giesecke Type Foundry
- Dolmen (video game), a 2022 video game
- The Dolmen, a UK band
- Dolmen City, a development in Karachi which houses the Dolmen Mall.

== See also ==
- Dolman, an article of clothing
