= Mortal Shell II =

- Developer: Cold Symmetry
- Publisher: Playstack
- Directors: Andrew McLennan-Murray; Anthony Gonzalez; Vitaly Bulgarov
- Writer: Ryan Schapals
- Composers: Lustmord; A. Liam Neighbours
- Engine: Unreal Engine 5
- Platforms: PlayStation 5; Windows; Xbox Series X/S
- Release: August 20, 2026
- Genre: Action role-playing
- Mode: Single-player

Mortal Shell II is an action role-playing video game developed by Cold Symmetry and published by Playstack. The game was released on August 20, 2026, for PlayStation 5, Windows, and Xbox Series X/S. Mortal Shell II is a standalone sequel to Mortal Shell.

Set in an interconnected dark fantasy world, the game follows the Harbinger, a being tasked with reclaiming the stolen eggs of the Undermether. Players can possess the bodies, known as Shells, of eight fallen warriors, each with unique abilities and combat styles. The game received positive reviews from critics.

== Gameplay ==
Mortal Shell II is played from a third-person perspective and features action-oriented combat. Unlike its predecessor, the game does not use a traditional stamina system, allowing players to perform attacks, dodges, and other actions without being restricted by a stamina gauge. Combat includes melee and ranged weapons, posture-breaking mechanics, critical strikes, and executions.

The game features eight playable Shells scattered throughout its world. Each Shell has its own abilities and can be upgraded as players progress. Weapons can also be customized and upgraded, allowing players to develop different combat styles. The world is designed as a compact, interconnected open world containing forests, temples, citadels, and other locations. More than 60 dungeons are located throughout the game, with exploration rewarding players with additional Shells, weapons, upgrades, and story elements.

== Plot ==
The player controls the Harbinger, who travels through a ravaged world in search of the stolen eggs of the Undermether. The eggs are guarded by dangerous creatures and powerful enemies. During the journey, the Harbinger can possess the bodies of eight lost warriors and find out their memories and individual stories.

== Development ==
Cold Symmetry announced Mortal Shell II during Summer Game Fest in June 2025. The game was developed by an expanded team and was described as a larger-scale sequel to the original Mortal Shell.

An open beta was held before release. The game was released worldwide on August 20, 2026, for PlayStation 5, Xbox Series X/S, and Windows. A digital deluxe edition, titled the Devout Edition, included additional Obsidian skins for the playable Shells and up to 72 hours of early access.

== Reception ==
Reception

Aggregate scores
Aggregator	Score
Metacritic	(PC) 82/100 (PS5) 84/100 (XSXS) 83/100
OpenCritic	89% recommend (Note: Based on 108 reviews)

Review scores
Publication	Score
Eurogamer	4/5
GameSpot	8/10
GamesRadar+	4/5
Giant Bomb	4.5/5
Hardcore Gamer	4.5/5
IGN	8/10
PCGamesN	7/10
Push Square	8/10
Shacknews	9/10

Mortal Shell II received "generally favourable" reviews, according to review aggregator website Metacritic. Fellow review aggregator OpenCritic assessed that the game received strong approval, being recommended by 89% of critics.

GameSpot gave the game a score of 8/10 and wrote: "Cold Symmetry's sequel improves upon its predecessor by continuing to deconstruct familiar souls-like mechanics."

IGN's score for the game was 8/10 and in their summary said: "Mortal Shell 2’s expansion into a large scale action-RPG is mostly successful, and all of its new ideas are great ones."
