= Hofen =

Hofen may mean:

- Hofen, Switzerland, a municipality in the Canton of Schaffhausen
- Hofen, a former community incorporated into modern Friedrichshafen, Germany
- Shahe fen or Héfěn (河粉, river vermicelli), a Chinese noodle dish similar to phở

== See also ==
- Höfen (disambiguation)
