= Last Flag =

2026 video game

- Developer: Night Street Games
- Publisher: Night Street Games
- Director: Matthew Berger
- Composers: Dan Reynolds; JT Daly; Dave Lowmiller
- Engine: Unreal Engine
- Platform: Windows
- Release: April 14, 2026
- Genre: Hero shooter
- Mode: Multiplayer

Last Flag is a third-person hero shooter developed and published by Night Street Games, a studio founded by Imagine Dragons vocalist Dan Reynolds. It is a spin on the classic capture the flag gameplay formula. It was released on April 14, 2026, for Windows with planned console ports.

== Gameplay ==
Last Flag is a 5v5 team based third person multiplayer shooter with an art style inspired by game shows from the 1970s. A hero shooter, it features nine characters with different abilities, weapons and team roles. It expands on the capture the flag formula by adding the ability to move and hide the flag as opposed to the flag spot being pre-determined. Both teams are given a minute to hide their flag and collect currency for character upgrades. Three towers are situated in the middle of the playfield; capturing them will provide healing to teammates and gradually scan sections the map, revealing the location of the flag if it lies in the scanned sections. After one team brings the opposing team's flag to their flag, the game enters sudden death, where the flag has to be defended for a period of time, giving the opponents a chance to win the flag back. Running out of health gets the player into a downed state where they can be finished off.

== Development ==
=== Conception ===
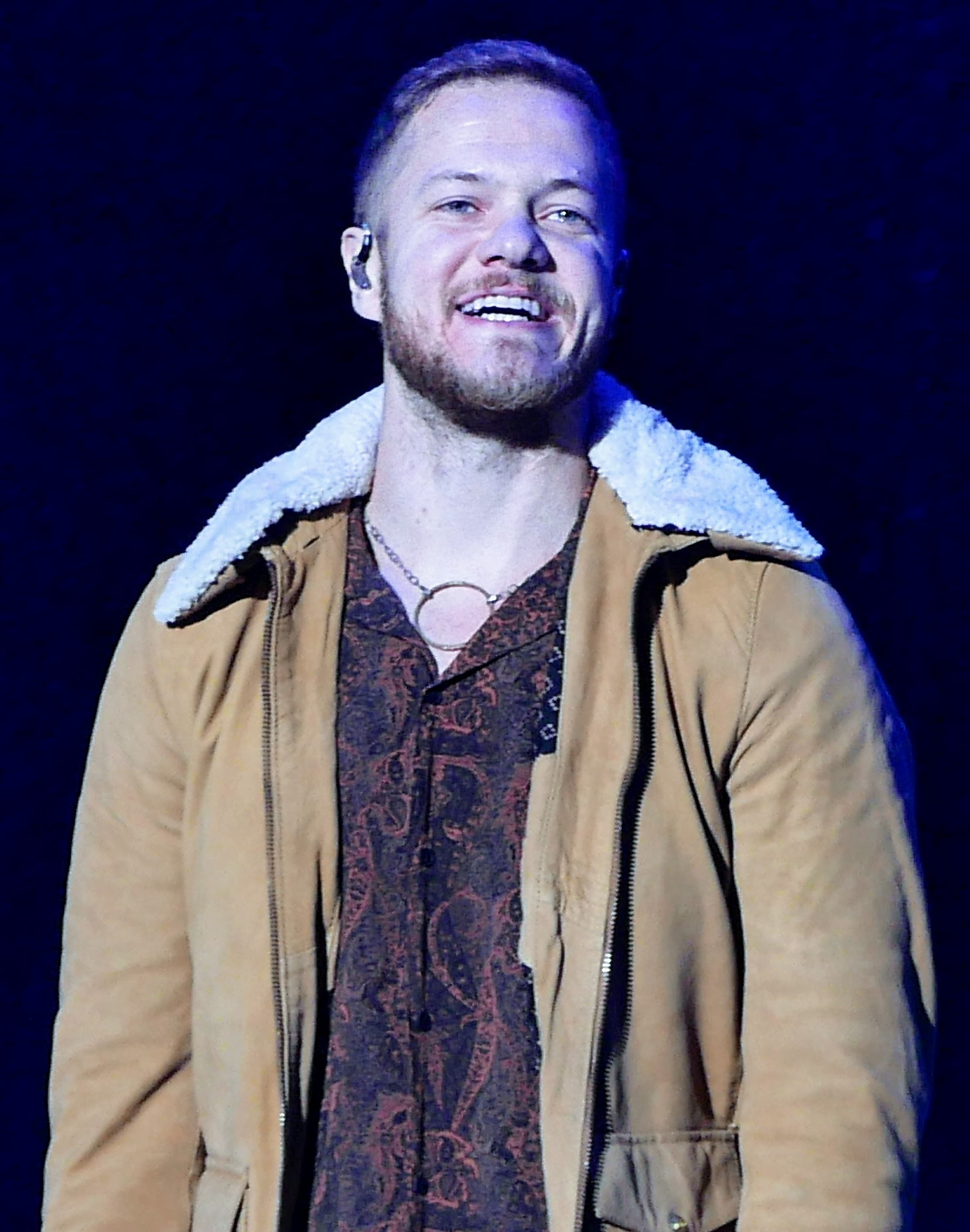
Dan Reynolds in 2017

Last Flag's development studio, the Las Vegas-based Night Street Games, was founded by Dan Reynolds, vocalist of the pop rock band Imagine Dragons, alongside his brother and band manager Mac Reynolds. Imagine Dragons have been involved with the video game industry since 2014 when they performed a The Legend Of Zelda medley with Nintendo composer Koji Kondo at The Game Awards 2014. They also composed "Children of the Sky", a song made in collaboration with Bethesda Softworks for their 2023 game Starfield.

Speaking to The Washington Post, Dan stated that he is a gamer and has played various games from Super Mario World to League of Legends, noting starting to play video games before playing music. In an interview with Variety, Mac stated that he wanted to run a video game studio since third grade. He also recalls "playing capture the flag in the woods at night with flashlights, friends, and lots of adrenaline", noting that video game versions of capture the flag, such as those present in Halo, do not "[scratch] that itch of what it feels like to play capture flag, which is real hiding, real finding, the thrill of nature, being a hero, sneaking around." On Steam, Night Street Games is described as "an independent game studio on a mission to build multiplayer games crafted with heart."

=== Production ===
The Reynold brothers recruited a team of developers and formed Night Street Games, with Mac becoming a CEO. Dan teased the project in 2021, stating "We've always talked about making a video game," noting to have worked on voice acting and character sketches. In an Epic Games Store blog, Mac described the game as "really more about hide-and-seek, strategy, and outsmarting your opponent." Last Flag was originally made using Unity, but the game engine was later switched to Unreal. NPC monsters, fog of war mechanics and items that could be picked up were planned for the game, but were scrapped due to them slowing down the gameplay. Last Flag is positioned as a "fun first, competitive second" shooter, with extensive playtesting to ensure careful balancing.

=== Music ===
The game's soundtrack is composed by Dan alongside Grammy-nominated musician JT Daly and Dave Lowmiller, the latter known for composing for the Battlefield and Dead Space series. The music was recorded using vintage instruments. Game director Matthew Berger stated "Sound is very important for us, and one of the our defining philosophies is we want you to have moments of fun, moments of joy at every moment of the game: whenever you press a button, when you're running and all that," noting putting special attention the song that plays to the losing team so that "you have lost, which is never great, but you get to have this really cool song that the winning team doesn't get. I think that's really important."

=== Announcements and release ===
Last Flag was announced at the Summer Game Fest 2025. In December 2025, a public game demo became available during Steam Next Fest on Steam. The game was released for Windows on April 14, 2026, with console ports being in production.

== Reception ==
=== Pre-release ===
After a 2025 digital preview event, Polygon stated that Last Flag "captures the essence of playing schoolyard games like hide-and-seek or capture the flag," calling the game "promising". PC Gamer criticized the movement and shooting mechanics, but otherwise called it a "great concept", praising the art style and comparing it to Team Fortress 2.

=== Post-release ===
Reception

Aggregate score
Aggregator	Score
Metacritic	(PC) 69/100

Review score
Publication	Score
Shacknews	6/10

The PC version of Last Flag received "mixed or average" reviews from critics, according to the review aggregator website Metacritic. Shacknews praised the original gameplay formula, describing it as a "tribute to a bygone era" and a "breath of fresh air" in an otherwise oversaturated market; criticism was directed at the underlying capture the flag mechanics, while the game's content at launch was deemed insufficient.

While the initial player reception was generally enthusiastic, Last Flag struggled to find its audience, attracting less than 600 players at launch with the player count slowly dwindling overtime. Consequently, the studio failed to achieve its expected financial goals. In May 2026, two weeks after release, Night Street Games announced the end of post-release support beyond the planned updates in the roadmap, while also abandoning plans to port the game to PlayStation 5 and Xbox Series X/S. Mac commented that Last Flag was "unable to find the audience it needs to give [the players] the experience [they] deserve". The studio also expressed its desire to "give [the game] to the community." The financial failure of Last Flag led the studio to lay off approximately half of its staff, reducing it to 13 employees.
