= Palworld =

2026 video game

- Promotional art
- Developer: Pocketpair
- Publisher: Pocketpair
- Director: Takuro Mizobe
- Producer: Takuro Mizobe
- Designer: Kotaro Suzuki
- Programmer: Hiroto Matsutani
- Artist: Daiki Kizu
- Composer: Tatsuya Yano
- Engine: Unreal Engine 5
- Platforms: Windows; Xbox One; Xbox Series X/S; PlayStation 5; macOS
- Release: July 10, 2026
- Genres: Survival, monster-taming
- Modes: Single-player, multiplayer

Palworld (Note: Japanese: パルワールド, Hepburn: Paruwārudo) is a monster-taming survival game created and published by Japanese developer Pocketpair. It was announced in 2021 and launched through early access for Windows, Xbox One, and Xbox Series X/S in January 2024, and for the PlayStation 5 in September 2024. The game was fully released on July 10, 2026.

The game is set in an open world populated with animal-like creatures called "Pals", which players can battle and capture to use for base building, traversal, and combat. Players may also assign the Pals to bases where they will automatically complete tasks for the player. Palworld can be played either solo or online with up to 32 players on one server.

The game's premise, which involves using firearms and equipping Pals with them, has earned it the nickname "Pokémon with guns". Other elements, such as using Pals for food or as manual labor in mines and factories, have also garnered a mixed reaction, with praise for its gameplay, content, and satirical premise, but criticism for its reliance on shock humor and for its use of unoriginal designs and mechanics.

== Gameplay ==
In Palworld, players control a customizable avatar from a third-person perspective and explore the open-world Palpagos Islands. Players must manage their hunger level, craft basic tools, gather materials, and build bases that act as fast travel points. Unlocks through a technology tree allow the player to craft and use weapons, structures, and decorations.

The islands are inhabited by 287 different types of creatures called Pals, which players directly engage in combat with to weaken and then capture using a variety of different tiers of "Pal Spheres". Pals can also be bought on the black market or through merchants through non-player characters or traded with other players, with the black market providing rarer Pals for lower Gold Coin prices. After obtaining Pals, they can be summoned to battle or stationed at bases to assist with tasks such as scavenging, crafting, and cooking depending on their type. Each Pal has a Partner Skill, allowing further utility by using them as weapons or mounts. However, not all Partner Skills are unlocked upon catching a Pal, and must instead be obtained through the crafting of equipment that permanently unlocks the Partner Skill.

Notably, human non-player characters can also be captured by the player by using Pal Spheres, which can allow for accessibility to the captured character at the player's base (which can include utilities offered, such as shops), but their working and combat statistics will be significantly lower than most Pals. The game also allows the player to butcher caught Pals and human NPC's using equipment such as a butcher knife or a disassembly line, which allows for an additional roll of that Pal or NPC's loot pool provided upon the catching or defeat of the Pal or NPC.

The player can manage and build their own base with their caught Pals.

The game's bosses and human assailants hail from various factions, such as the Rayne Syndicate, the Free Pal Alliance, the Brothers of the Eternal Pyre, the Palpagos Islands Defense Force, the PAL Genetic Research Unit, the Moonflower Clan, the Feybreak Warriors, and the Azure Covenant. These factions are led by powerful Pal Tamers who reside in towers across the islands and are the game's main boss battles. The factions include human NPCs who occasionally spawn in the world, either patrolling or battling each other, who are hostile to the player and can fight them with weapons. The game features a wanted level system; if the player commits a crime, usually against humans, other human NPCs will become hostile and defense force troopers will spawn to attack them until they are killed or evade their pursuers.

Certain islands in the game are "Wildlife Sanctuaries" which, in prior versions, increased the player character's wanted level if they were caught by a patrolling officer similar to if they attacked a human in the presence of a witness. However, the 1.0 update incorporates more stealth and puzzle elements in these areas in the form of patrolling ancient drones that are meant to be avoided due to their high stats, and devices to disable force fields placed around each sanctuary. To reward the player for exploring the areas without being caught, certain Pal species, such as certain ones used by the game's boss battles, can only naturally spawn within these areas.

== Synopsis ==
The game opens with the player character washing up on a shore of the Palpagos Islands, where they find a damaged tablet instructing them to pursue the Towers and the World Tree. After the tablet is fixed by a fellow survivor, the player character ventures to a nearby village where they are told by the village's chief about the World Tree and that the de facto leader of the Rayne Syndicate, Zoe Rayne, likely has knowledge of it and the history of the Palpagos Islands. However, Zoe attacks the player character when they enter her Tower, though she is defeated and drops a mysterious device known as a Key Sphere. The player character then learns from both the village chief and Zoe that Key Spheres are held by each of the Towers' faction leaders, and that they are important to reaching the World Tree.

The player character then travels across the Palpagos Islands, defeating each of the Towers' faction leaders and claiming their Key Spheres. Along the way, the player also learns about the Calamity, an apocalyptic event that wiped out the ancient civilization that once inhabited the Palpagos Islands in a single night. After defeating Auri, the leader of the Azure Covenant faction, she informs the player about how the creature that brought about the Calamity was sealed away inside the World Tree, though it has been steadily draining the tree's life essence since its imprisonment. To prevent the creature from growing strong enough to escape, Auri tells the player character to venture into the World Tree with the help of the legendary Pal Panthalus and defeat the creature to save the Palpagos Islands.

After the player character recruits Panthalus and enters the World Tree, they place each of the Key Spheres into a door at the tree's core and encounter Astralym, the creature that brought about the ancient civilization's demise, and Zenara, a biologist of the Ancient Civilization who ultimately aligned herself with Astralym after the Ancients discredited her work on it. Zenara then fuses with Astralym and attacks the player character, but is defeated and ends up buried under rubble. The player then falls into darkness as the arena collapses around them before reawakening on the shore they washed up on surrounded by the Pals they have befriended.

== Development ==
=== Pre-release ===
Palworld is developed and published by Pocketpair, an independent and doujin soft company based in Shinagawa, Tokyo. It was their second early access open world survival project, following Craftopia. Like it, it uses gameplay mechanics reminiscent of The Legend of Zelda: Breath of the Wild, but has added creature-collecting mechanics popularized by the Pokémon franchise. Pocketpair said that Pokémon was not one of their main inspirations. According to CEO Takuro Mizobe, the concept of Palworld is based on Ark: Survival Evolved, which also had monster companions in dinosaurs; the survival mechanics and in-game tasks were inspired by Rust. RimWorld was also cited as a major inspiration for the game.

The game uses more original assets than Craftopia, which proved to be challenging for the team. Early in development, it was decided to move Palworld from Unity, which powered Pocketpair's earlier projects, to Unreal Engine 4, as they decided it was more suitable for heavier open-world games. It was first planned for release in 2022, but the deadline was extended to August 2023 as the scope of the project grew and the company hired more staff, and then once again to support dedicated servers on launch. When early access began, the game was estimated to be 60% complete.

In total, the budget exceeded 1 billion yen, and the company hired over 40 additional employees. The game's character animator was hired, despite having no prior industry experience, after Takuro Mizobe reached out to a hobbyist animator on YouTube who had been uploading combat animation videos and Girls' Frontline fan content. The game's director applied during a Twitter recruitment run despite already lining up for a position at NetEase. The main character designer for the Pals was initially rejected during an October 2020 recruitment drive for illustrators, but was hired when she reapplied in February 2021.

Development for Pal designs proceeded through a series of concept arts produced by artists, with voting on the submitted designs done via the platform Slack. Pals that did not make it through this voting process often had portions of them reworked or incorporated into other submitted Pal designs. One notable Pal that received acclaim among the Pocketpair staff was the Pal Sekhmet, who was initially introduced in the upcoming spin-off game Palfarm as a companion to the Pal Anubis. Sekhmet was later fully introduced into Palworld in the 1.0 update as a potential encounter in the game's desert regions.

=== Post-release ===
After release, Pocketpair staff immediately started work on future updates for the game including the 1.1 update, which reportedly contained a feature "...players have been screaming at us to do for a while." On October 20 of 2026, the 1.1 update and its subtitle, Side By Side, were revealed along with silhouettes of the characters Zoe, Saya, and Auri. Speculation as to the content of the update has included the recruitment of Saya and Auri as allies to the player, as a prior questline in the game has allowed for the recruitment of Zoe to the player's base.

== Release ==
The game was revealed on June 5, 2021, detailing key features such as survival, crafting, exploration, exploitation of creatures, and the multiplayer focus. More details were shared over the following years, and the game appeared as part of presentations such as Tokyo Game Show, where Pocketpair announced the release for Xbox consoles in addition to PC, and Summer Game Fest, where they revealed an early access launch window in January 2024.

Palworld was released on January 19, 2024, through Steam Early Access and Xbox Game Preview, and is available with Game Pass from day one. The game was expected to remain in early access until 2026. Planned features for future updates include PvP modes, guild raids, and cross-server Pal trading. On June 10, 2024, it was announced that the game would be released in early access for macOS later that year. On June 24, 2024, it was teased to be released on PlayStation 5. Pocketpair announced the first major expansion to be released on June 27, 2024, which includes new Pals, a new island called Sakurajima, and other new content. On September 25, 2024, the PlayStation 5 version of the game was released. On December 23, 2024, the production team released a major update Feybreak Island. On March 19, 2025, update 0.5.0 added crossplay across all platforms. After being in early access for almost two years, Pocketpair announced the full release of the game (known as the 1.0 update) on June 6, 2026, with a July 10 release date. The release brought many new mechanics, areas, and content.

=== Potential Nintendo Switch 2 release ===
In October 2026, Nintendo Life reported that Pocketpair is open to the idea of bringing Palworld to the Nintendo Switch 2 in the future, but the studio will first have to work out their legal dispute with Nintendo and The Pokémon Company before they make a compromise.

== Reception ==
=== Pre-release ===
The game's reveal trailer was met with high engagement on social media and mixed reception, ranging from excitement to disgust. The phrase "Pokémon with guns" was commonly used to refer to the game by both players and journalists. Some viewers thought that the game was fake, a sentiment that surprised the development team. It also received some skepticism due to the unfinished state of the developer's earlier work, Craftopia. The satirical tone of promotional material, with references to labor laws and illegal hunting, sparked interest in the game exploring the dark undertones of the creature-collecting genre. In Brazil, the game's publicity was boosted due to the pronunciation of pal being similar to pau in Portuguese. Pau can mean 'wood' but is also sexual slang for penis. Both players and journalists made various puns when discussing the game and the Pals due to this double meaning.

=== Early access ===
Palworld received mixed reviews from critics. IGN and PC Invasion praised its fun combat and engaging gameplay loop, with the latter noting the large, albeit somewhat barren, environments being brought to life by different Pals. The Escapist described the combat allowing players to fight alongside their Pals against tougher enemies as a high point. PCGamesN called the game "a morbidly compelling descent into creature capitalism", stating that though it had some flaws, such as its insistence on ethically questionable behavior and the unoriginal designs of Pals, its gameplay and the open world made up for it. GameSpot praised the game's mechanics and tone as a "refreshing perspective in a genre so often tripping over itself to present things as joyous and heartfelt", believing it to represent the first time "a creature collector game has owned up to its exploitation-as-gameplay systems."

Conversely, Rock Paper Shotgun and PC Gamer criticized Palworld for relying too heavily on shock humor about animal abuse and sweatshop labor in its gameplay, which PC Gamer derided as "mid-2000s Newgrounds edgelord" and "over-committing to the bit", with Rock Paper Shotgun arguing the gameplay mechanics and presentation of Pals fundamentally misunderstood the meanings and appeal behind Pokémon and the monster-catching genre. It also attracted some criticism for the unoriginal designs of Pals and mechanics lifted from other titles, which VG247 thought undermined a game "worth admiring".

Palworld sold over one million copies in its first eight hours of early access on January 19, 2024, which rose to two million copies within the first 24 hours, three million copies within the first 40 hours, five million copies by day 3, six million by day 4, seven million by day 5, and eight million by day 6. On January 24, 2024, it reached over 2,000,000 concurrent players on Steam, becoming the first game since PUBG: Battlegrounds to achieve this feat. The high player count led to server issues. On January 27, Palworld recorded 2,101,867 concurrent players on Steam. By February 1, the game sold 12 million copies on Steam and had reached 7 million players on Xbox. According to Microsoft, the game was the most-played 3rd party release on Xbox Game Pass, reaching a peak of almost 3 million daily active players on the Xbox platform. As of February 22, 2024, the game sold 15 million copies on Steam and had reached 10 million players on Xbox.

By February 11, the game reportedly faced the largest two-week player drop on Steam - down from its peak concurrent player count of 2,101,867 to about 750,000 concurrent players. In response to those reports, Pocketpair community manager Bucky wrote on Twitter "This emerging 'Palworld has lost X% of its player base' discourse is lazy, but it's probably also a good time to step in and reassure those of you capable of reading past a headline that it is fine to take breaks from games." He also wrote "If you are still playing Palworld, we love you. If you're no longer playing Palworld, we still love you, and we hope you'll come back for round two when you're ready." As of February 2025, Palworld has attracted over 32 million players across all platforms, including PC via Steam, Xbox, and PlayStation 5. Palworld later returned to Steam's list of the 10 most-played games in July following the release of its Terraria-themed update. The update contributed to a 24-hour peak of 122,397 concurrent players, placing the title among the platform's top performers at the time.

=== Release ===
Reception

Aggregate score
Aggregator	Score
OpenCritic	72% recommend (Note: Based on 34 reviews, as of September 25, 2026)

Palworld reached a peak of 961,867 concurrent players on Steam in the second weekend after its release.

=== Accolades ===
Year	Ceremony	Category	Result	Ref.
2024	Golden Joystick Awards	Best Early Access Game	Nominated	
2024	The Steam Awards	Better With Friends	Nominated	
2026	Golden Joystick Awards	Still Playing — PC & Console	Nominated	

== Nintendo and The Pokémon Company lawsuit ==
Shortly after release, users on Twitter alleged similarities between the designs of several Pals and Pokémon, with a user claiming to show evidence of plagiarism of game assets. However, several legal experts have pointed out that Palworld's creatures were unlikely to be infringing on the copyrights in Pokémon species designs, instead borrowing only the general ideas for various creature concepts (see idea–expression distinction). The CEO of Pocketpair stated that the character concepts were mostly designed by a single graduate student hired in 2021 following the company's public recruitment run for new illustrators. He also states that the game has cleared legal reviews. On January 24, The Pokémon Company issued a statement indirectly citing the game, writing: "[We] have received many inquiries regarding another company's game released in January 2024 ... we intend to investigate and take appropriate measures to address any acts that infringe on intellectual property rights related to the Pokémon." Pocketpair's CEO stated that the company has received death threats from Japanese users on Twitter.

Nintendo and The Pokémon Company filed a lawsuit against Pocketpair for infringement of patent rights in the Tokyo District Court on September 18, 2024. The corporations claimed a mechanic in Palworld is similar to catching Pokémon in a virtual field. Nintendo and The Pokémon Company sought 5 million yen for each plus late payment damages, as well as an injunction against Palworld to block its release. In response, Pocketpair stated it was unaware of any patents it had violated. Pocketpair released patches for Palworld that altered the mechanics similar to Pokémon's. In December, Nintendo filed a series of patents in the United States designed to challenge Pocketpair in court there as well. One of the 23 patents was approved while the rest were rejected.

Pocketpair disputed Nintendo's case, arguing there had been game mods similar to the Pokémon catching mechanic, such as the Pocket Souls mod for Dark Souls III, and these prior arts invalidated Nintendo's patent claims. In response, Nintendo claimed mods are not subject to patent infringement, because they do not stand on their own due to requiring an original game on which they must run. Florian Mueller, an analyst from Games Fray, called Nintendo's position "extreme", saying the company disregarded the creativity of modders, and Nintendo's view could allow others to patent modders' ideas. The court scheduled a presentation of evidence for 1 October 2026, and will express an opinion on 9 November.

== See also ==
- Palworld Trading Card Game
- Video game clone
