= Palworld Trading Card Game =

2026 trading card game

Palworld
- Publishers: Bushiroad
- Genres: Trading card game
- Players: 2
- Chance: Medium (card draw)

Palworld Trading Card Game is a trading card game based on the survival video game Palworld. It was released on July 30, 2026, with publishing and development done by Bushiroad.

The first expansion was Dawn of Palpagos, released on July 30, 2026. It sold more than 3.5 million cards, with cards selling for high prices.

== Gameplay ==
The game starts with a determination of which of the two players go first (with rock paper scissors being provided as an example by the official manual). There are two card decks, the main deck which consists of 50 cards (which also includes up to eight Lucky cards), and the Soul deck. Souls are used to pay for cards in the main deck. Pals are the primary card types in the games, and represent the creatures in Palworld. There exist five colors of non-Soul cards: Red, Blue, Green, Purple, and Colorless. Players can use Colorless cards freely, but can only use up to two of the four other colors in their deck. Every turn, the player can put 2 soul cards from the soul deck on the base. Pals on each turn can attack other pals or structures, attack the opposing player, or stand to block enemy attacks and be unable to be directly targeted by enemy Pals. Combat between Pals is based on Pals' Power values, and Pals with higher maximum Power values will destroy weaker ones in combat even if their current Power was depleted through another effect. Power values also determine the damage Pals deal to Structure cards. Each pal also has a Strike value, which determines the damage done and cards in the deck lost for every attack targeted at a player. However, if a player manages to draw a Lucky card during the player damage check, they avoid taking damage and stop drawing any more cards from their deck. Each player starts with 10 Life points and if a player's Life points drop to zero or run out of cards in their deck, they lose the game. Certain Pals in the player's hand can also interrupt any attack targeted at a Pal, Structure, or player, and will consume one Soul card or a card in the player's hand to do so.

In addition to Pals, there are Event cards with a temporary effect, Gear cards that can buff Pals or do one time effects, or Structure cards that can help the player if a Pal is assigned to one or consume cards while it is on the field to cause special effects. There also exist two resource counters: Materials and Ingredients, which can be made or consumed by Structures and Pals to cause special effects. Day and Night can also be invoked by certain Pals and Structures, with Night granting additional effects to certain Purple Pals.
