= The Last Oricru =

- Developer: GoldKnights
- Publisher: Prime Matter
- Designer: Pavel Jiří Strnad
- Engine: Unreal Engine 4
- Platforms: Microsoft Windows; PlayStation 5 Xbox Series X/S
- Release: 13 October 2022
- Genre: Action role-playing
- Mode: Single-player Multiplayer

The Last Oricru is a 2022 action role-playing game developed by GoldKnights and published by Prime Matter.

== Development ==
Development for the game began in 2017 using Unreal Engine 4. It is the first project of Czech studio GoldKnights. Around 40 developers worked on the game which was originally named Lost Hero. It changed its name to The Last Oricru in 2021 when Koch Media, now Plaion, was announced as game's publisher.

== Plot ==
The Last Oricru is set on Planet Wardenia and follows the immortal warrior, Silver, who crash-landed on the planet and gets involved in the conflict between local factions.

== Gameplay ==
Gameplay is inspired by Dark Souls. It gives large focus on story which is non-linear with every decision making changes in game's world.

== Reception ==
The Last Oricru was released to mixed reviews. Metacritic listed The Last Oricru as the seventh-worst game of 2022.
