= Splitgate =

2021 video game

- Developer: 1047 Games
- Publisher: 1047 Games
- Engine: Unreal Engine 4
- Platforms: Microsoft Windows; Linux; PlayStation 4; PlayStation 5; Xbox One; Xbox Series X/S
- Release: Early access On May 24, 2019 (PC); On July 27, 2021 (consoles); Indefinite beta On August 25, 2021; Official release On September 15, 2022
- Genre: First-person shooter
- Mode: Multiplayer

Splitgate (known during development under the working title Splitgate: Arena Warfare and originally known as Wormhole Wars) is a free-to-play multiplayer first-person shooter video game developed and published by 1047 Games. It was released in early access on May 24, 2019, for Linux and Microsoft Windows on Steam, and on Xbox One, and PlayStation 4 on July 27, 2021. A PlayStation 5 and Xbox Series X/S version came in 2022. On August 25, 2021, the developers announced that the game would stay in beta indefinitely and at the same time released Season 0. The game revolves around Halo-inspired sci-fi combat in battle arenas where players can create wormhole portals between two points on the map that have been compared to those of the Portal series, and fire weapons or travel through those portals.

A sequel, Splitgate 2, was released on June 6, 2025. The dedicated servers for the original Splitgate were shut down on August 29, 2025.

== Development ==
The game was developed by Nevada-based 1047 Games. Its founders, Ian Proulx and Nicholas Bagamian started working on the game as a school project while they were attending Stanford University studying computer science. Proulx was inspired by Portal and Portal 2, and believed that its mechanic could translate well into other video game genres. They worked on the game without funding for six months, and then released a demo for user testing, which became unexpectedly popular as the game drew 600,000 downloads in its first month of release. The game design philosophy was described to be similar to that of Fortnite and Rocket League, in which the game is "easy to learn" but "difficult to master".

The game was released as a free-to-play title on Steam on May 24, 2019. 1047 Games continued to work on the game post-release and had raised a total of $10 million for the project by May 2021 from investors. In June 2021, the company announced that the game would be coming to PlayStation 4, PlayStation 5, Xbox One, and Xbox Series X/S with cross-platform play supported.

While Splitgate struggled to maintain a viable player base after its initial early access launch in 2019, the game saw a significant surge of players when the game's beta launched in early July 2021, causing it to surpass 600,000 downloads in the first week. Its sudden popularity was unexpected by the developers and led to the game going offline several times to fix server issues. This led to the postponement of its departure from early access while the developers attempted to increase server capacity to handle well over 100,000 concurrent players. Despite attempts at increasing server capacity, a queue system was implemented to limit the number of players logging onto the game. Developers posted updates on the server's status on their Twitter accounts until the system was removed in August 2021. On July 22, 2025, the official Splitgate X account has announced that they will be shutting down Splitgate's dedicated servers, so they can continue supporting Splitgate 2.

=== Seasons ===
Season	Title	Period	Description
0	Season Zero	August 25, 2021 – January 27, 2022	The first season of Splitgate included a new map called "Karman Station", a new game mode called "Contamination", a new battle pass that builds off of the beta battle pass, and balance changes.
1	Season One	January 27, 2022 – present	The second season of Splitgate added a highly anticipated map creator beta, and brought new fidelity changes to the map Foregone Destruction as well as a new simulation map called Hotel. It also included the new game modes "Evolution" and "One Flag Capture the Flag", a new battle pass with skins and other in-game goodies, and some graphical overhauls to all maps.

== Reception ==
Reception

Aggregate score
Aggregator	Score
Metacritic	68/100

Review scores
Publication	Score
GameRevolution	3.5/5
IGN	7.1/10

Splitgate received an aggregate score of 68/100 on Metacritic. Samuel Horti of IGN said that while the game is an "average arena FPS", the "clever twist" of being able to place portals turns it into a "smart, tactical team-based shooter". However, he criticized the game's "bland" maps and its low player count, which made it difficult to create balanced matches. Alex Santa Maria of Game Revolution called the gameplay "impressively solid" but saying it needed "a bit more visual flair" and comparing the game's armor designs to "forgotten also-rans like Section 8". Aiman Maulana of the New Straits Times rated the game 7/10, calling the gameplay variety "decent", but saying it needed more content and maps.

Polygon included Splitgate under their list of what they considered to be the "best games of 2021."

== Sequel ==
A sequel, Splitgate 2, was released for Windows, PlayStation 4, PlayStation 5, Xbox One and Xbox Series X and Series S in June 2025.
