= Encased =

2021 video game

Encased: A Sci-Fi Post-Apocalyptic RPG
- Developer: Dark Crystal Games
- Publisher: Prime Matter
- Engine: Unity
- Platform: Microsoft Windows
- Release: September 7, 2021
- Genre: Role-playing
- Mode: Single-player

Encased: A Sci-Fi Post-Apocalyptic RPG, is an isometric turn-based RPG developed by Dark Crystal Games and inspired by computer role-playing games such as Fallout and Wasteland as well as the classic and influenctial Soviet era science fiction novel Roadside Picnic by Arkady and Boris Strugatsky. The game was released in early access on Microsoft Windows on September 26, 2019, and its full release was on September 7, 2021.

== Gameplay ==
The gameplay is inspired by classic computer RPGs such as Fallout. It features a turn-based combat system with an isometric camera view. One of the game's distinguishing features is its emphasis on storybuilding, with the player's decisions affecting the rest of the gameplay in one way or another.

Character customization is a key feature, along with a reputation system where a character's reputation can change due to player choice. While the player begins with only one character of their creation, various companions can also join them along the way.

== Plot ==
The story take place in an alternative history version of the 1970s. A huge building called the Dome was discovered in a remote, created by unknown beings called the Forefathers.

Beneath the Dome, subterranean complexes contain advanced technology, artifacts, automated defense systems, traps, and anomalies. An energy field prevents anyone who enters the Dome from leaving. The CRONUS Corporation, a coalition backed by major world powers, oversees exploration and research within the Dome, dividing operations into five specialized branches known as Wings

== Development ==
May 18, 2018 Encased development was announced by Russian studio Dark Crystal Games. After the game's announcement, Dark Crystal Games were considering additional funding avenues. This ended in the September 2018 launch of the Kickstarter campaign, that was aiming to expand the game content, not funding it

The full release was on September 7, 2021. Under the wing of Prime Matter Publishing, a subsidiary of Koch Media.

The developers have published a roadmap with plans for further content development for the game through the spring of 2022.

== Reception ==
Reception

Aggregate score
Aggregator	Score
Metacritic	73/100

Review scores
Publication	Score
Eurogamer	7/10
Jeuxvideo.com	14/20

Encased received mixed reviews on Metacritic. Jeuxvideo praised the game's faithfulness to its inspirations but said the combat was too rooted in old-school gameplay. Alberto Naso of Eurogamer Italia praised the storytelling and visuals, but also felt the combat was lacking.
