= Mecha Break =

- Developer: Amazing Seasun Games
- Publisher: Amazing Seasun Games
- Platforms: Windows; Xbox Series X/S; PlayStation 5
- Release: Windows, Xbox Series X/S; July 1, 2025; PlayStation 5; 2026
- Genre: Shooter game
- Mode: Multiplayer

Mecha Break (Chinese: 解限机) is a mecha shooter game developed by Kingsoft's subsidiary Amazing Seasun Games. It was announced at The Game Awards 2023. It supports cross-platform connectivity between Windows and Xbox Series X/S. It was released on July 1, 2025, with plans to release on PlayStation 5 middle of 2026.

== Plot ==
Mech Break is set in an alternate world where a virtual "Great Catastrophe" in 2082 led to the discovery of an allotrope of Silicon Carbide called Corite, or EIC. This mineral became the solution to Earth's energy crisis. However, the use of Corite comes with severe side effects, including high infectivity and strong pathogenicity. Polluted areas, referred to as "Marcens Zones", quickly spread across the globe. Only mechas, known as "strikers", are capable of operating within these high-contamination zones. They are powered by a high-purity form of Corite known as Corixium. To ensure the survival of civilization and uncover the truth behind this world, striker pilots fight battles and run resource-gathering ops.

== Gameplay ==
Mecha Break is an online team-based game, primarily played in the form of a shooter. The game features 3 main modes, mainly focusing on team coordination in battles or achieving specific objectives. These are, in the order they are presented: Operation: VERGE, a 6v6 mode that has a number of different maps and match types, such as Control points, Payload, and Deathmatch; Operation: STORM, a Free-for-all(FFA) Extraction Shooter mode, which features the option to play in a team of up to 3 and/or in a 'covert ops' mode where there are no player enemies; and ACE ARENA, a 3v3 deathmatch mode. Players can choose from multiple strikers across five class types: Attacker, who deals most of the damage to attack or defend control points; Defender, who absorbs large amounts of damage; and Supporter, who provides healing or other buffs to teammates. Other roles include Brawler and Sniper, each offering unique playstyles.

Below is a table of the different strikers, as of March 5, 2026, and their roles:

Striker Name	ID/code	Weight	Role
FALCON	UBP-R02T	Light	Attacker
PANTHER	UBP-A04S	Medium	Brawler
ALYSNES	PGI-X30G1	Medium	Attacker
TRICERA	SLM-M324C	Ultra-heavy	Defender
NARUKAMI	KMA-D201	Light	Sniper
LUMINAE	NGL-XR30	Light	Support
PINAKA	MHI-XT31	Medium	Support
INFERNO	SLM-M143	Ultra-heavy	Attacker
SKYRAIDER	NGS-Y244E	Medium	Attacker
WELKIN	PGI-T02	Heavy	Brawler
AQUILA	NGS-X327A	Heavy	Sniper
STEGO	SLM-M334F	Ultra-heavy	Attacker
HURRICANE	SLM-M144	Ultra-heavy	Defender
STELLARIS	PGI-T27G	Light	Brawler
SERENITH	MHI-SR00	Light	Support
ALPHARD	NGS-X241T	Medium	Attacker
HEL	UBP-DO6A	Medium	Attacker
NORNE	UBP-D08E	Light	Sniper
MIKILLJA	PGI-T06	Ultra-heavy	Attacker
FREYR	UBP-A05S	Heavy	Attacker

The game's soundtrack includes composer Hiroyuki Sawano, who has previously featured in other mecha works such as Aldnoah.Zero.

The open beta for Mecha Break launched in February 2025 and reached over 300,000 concurrent players on Steam. This milestone briefly allowed the game to surpass Marvel Rivals in player count.

== Reception ==
On Metacritic, Mecha Break received mixed reviews for Windows and positive reviews for Xbox Series X/S.
