= Splitgate 2 =

2025 video game

- Developer: 1047 Games
- Publisher: 1047 Games
- Director: Ian Proulx
- Engine: Unreal Engine 5
- Platforms: PlayStation 4; PlayStation 5; Windows; Xbox One; Xbox Series X/S
- Release: Initial release June 6, 2025; Arena Reloaded; December 17, 2025
- Genre: First-person shooter
- Mode: Multiplayer

Splitgate 2 is a free-to-play first-person shooter developed and published by 1047 Games. A successor to Splitgate (2019), it was released for PlayStation 4, PlayStation 5, Windows, Xbox One and Xbox Series X/S in June 2025. Following a lackluster response to the game's original launch, it returned to beta a month later and was relaunched as Splitgate: Arena Reloaded on December 17, 2025.

== Gameplay ==
Splitgate 2 is a first-person shooter. Players can place portals between two points on a map, and they can fire weapons or travel through those portals. The game features several gameplay modes. In addition to the round-based team deathmatch mode, the game introduces Hot Zone, a mode similar to King of the Hill. In Hot Zone, respawn time gradually increases as a match progresses, though successful eliminations will lower the respawn time. Splitgate 2 also has a 60-player battle royale mode. and a map creator named the Lab.

The game has three factions of characters, with each having their own unique gameplay mechanics. The faction "Aeros" is fast and agile for players who prefer fast-paced gameplay; Meridian is a support-focused faction that can heal allies, detect enemy location, and track an enemy's health level; Sabrask focuses mainly on using defensive strategies rather than using portals, and players can place "smart walls" that block enemy attacks.

== Development ==
In September 2022, 1047 Games announced that they have ended the development of Splitgate to work on a new, free-to-play game set in the same universe. While the first game was created by about 15 people, Splitgate 2 was created by a team of more than 200 people. While the original Splitgate started as a student game, Splitgate 2 was considered by Ian Proulx, the creative director, as a triple-A product. He cited hero shooters, Call of Duty, and Halo as the game's main sources of inspiration, and compared the game to Valorant, in which a player's success in combat is governed by their "ability to shoot and portal and have good positioning" rather than the use of active abilities. Maps in Splitgate 2 were designed to be more symmetrical and less vertical, with greater similarities to maps from multiplayer games like Call of Duty than to those of arena shooters. The game is developed using Unreal Engine 5.

1047 Games announced Splitgate 2 in July 2024. An open beta including 25 weapons, 15 maps and 10 modes was released on May 22, 2025. The game was released in full on June 6, 2025, for PlayStation 4, PlayStation 5, Windows, Xbox One and Xbox Series X/S. Splitgate 2 was designed to be a live service game, with 1047 planning to add and rotate content regularly.

The game was rebranded as Splitgate: Arena Reloaded and was relaunched on December 17, adding a new progression system and new maps and weapons, while removing factions and character abilities, allowing for any weapon to be equipped, regardless of the player's character, and abilities were able to be picked up on the map, such as Rush and Hypersight. On August 26, 2026, it was announced that the game's dedicated servers and matchmaking would be shut down. However, the game is still playable through peer-to-peer servers.

== Controversies ==
At the 2025 Summer Game Fest on June 6, 2025, a trailer presentation from Proulx received negative reception from both video game journalists and fans when he appeared on the stage wearing a "Make FPS Great Again" hat, while criticizing other FPS games like Halo and Call of Duty. He said it was not a political statement, although PCGamesN described it as "tone-deaf" regardless of whether it was. An additional controversy emerged over the game's expensive launch microtransactions, such as a "Nano Swarm" bundle that cost US$70 even at a 45% discount. Players also accused the developers of hypocrisy for including a battle royale mode, commonly seen in the Call of Duty series. Proulx responded to the backlash by announcing the price of the bundle and other microtransactions in the game's store would be halved, as well as stating that he believed the development team had innovated sufficiently to not be "[chasing] a trend" by including battle royale.

On July 22, 2025, 1047 Studios release a statement apologizing for the state of the game's release and announced that Splitgate 2 would be "going back to beta", with minimal updates until 2026 in order to focus on reworking various aspects of the game with improved playtesting. The studio also announced staff layoffs and that the original Splitgate's servers would be taken offline due to a lack of funds to keep the game operational.

== Reception ==
Reception

Aggregate scores
Aggregator	Score
Metacritic	(PC) 68/100 (PS5) 67/100
OpenCritic	45% recommend

Review scores
Publication	Score
GamesRadar+	3.5/5
IGN	7/10
PC Gamer (US)	60/100
Push Square	7/10
Shacknews	7/10

Splitgate 2 received "mixed or average" reviews from critics, according to review aggregator website Metacritic. Fellow review aggregator OpenCritic assessed that the game received fair approval, being recommended by 45% of critics.

After the game was relaunched as Splitgate: Arena Reloaded, media outlets noted that Steam player-counts peaked at 2,297 users, less than 10% of its initial release. 1047 Games responded with a statement that "Steam Charts don't measure fun. They show one number, on one platform...they don't show the full picture or what it feels like to actually play".
