= Dolmen (video game) =

- Developer: Massive Work Studio
- Publisher: Prime Matter
- Engine: Unreal Engine
- Platforms: PlayStation 4; PlayStation 5; Windows; Xbox One; Xbox Series X/S
- Release: WW: May 20, 2022
- Genre: Action role-playing game
- Modes: Single-player, multiplayer

Dolmen is an action role-playing video game developed by Massive Work Studio. Prime Matter published it for PlayStation 4 and 5, Xbox One and Series X/S, and Windows in May 2022. It is a science fiction-themed Soulslike set on an alien planet.

== Gameplay ==
Players are tasked with landing on an uncolonized planet and retrieving Dolmen crystals, which are used for space travel. While exploring, players discover it is inhabited by Lovecraftian monsters. Dolmen is an action role-playing game played from a third-person perspective. There are three character classes, each of whom have their own skill tree. During combat, players must time their attacks and defenses properly. When defeated, the player's character drops any crystals they were carrying. After respawning, players must return to where they died and collect the crystals. Dying again causes the crystals to become irretrievable.

== Development ==
There were two crowdfunding campaigns for Dolmen in 2018. The first did not reach its goal, but the second did. Prime Matter released it for PlayStation 4 and 5, Xbox One and Series X/S, and Windows on May 20, 2022.

== Reception ==
Dolmen received mixed reviews on Metacritic. Shacknews called it "a solid sci-fi spin on the Soulslike formula", though they criticized the lack of a jumping mechanic and the cutscenes, which they felt were lower quality than the rest of the game. Commenting on what they felt was poorly balanced gameplay, NME said it "misunderstands why Soulslike games are so enticing". Gamepressure said it "looks great" but the gameplay fails to live up to its influences.
