= Höfen, Tyrol =

Höfen
- Municipality
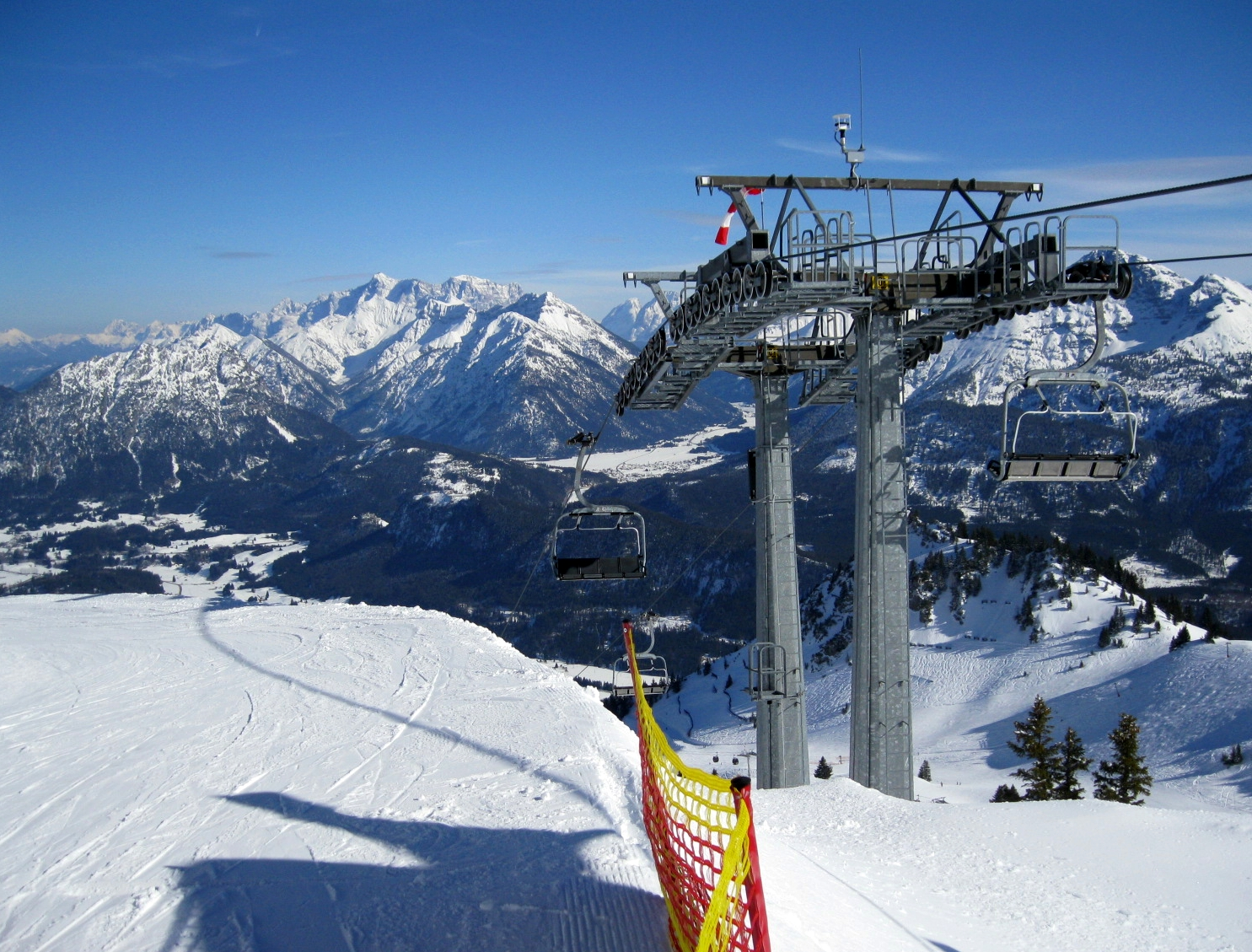

- Coat of arms

- Location within Austria
- Coordinates: 47°28′16″N 10°41′14″E
- Country: Austria
- State: Tyrol
- District: Reutte

Government
  - Mayor: Vinzenz Knapp

Area
  - Total: 8.36 km^{2} (3.23 sq mi)
- Elevation: 868 m (2,848 ft)

Population (2018-01-01)
  - Total: 1,200
  - Density: 140/km^{2} (370/sq mi)
- Time zone: UTC+1 (CET)
  - Summer (DST): UTC+2 (CEST)
- Postal code: 6600
- Area code: 05672
- Vehicle registration: RE

Höfen is a municipality in the district of Reutte in the Austrian state of Tyrol.

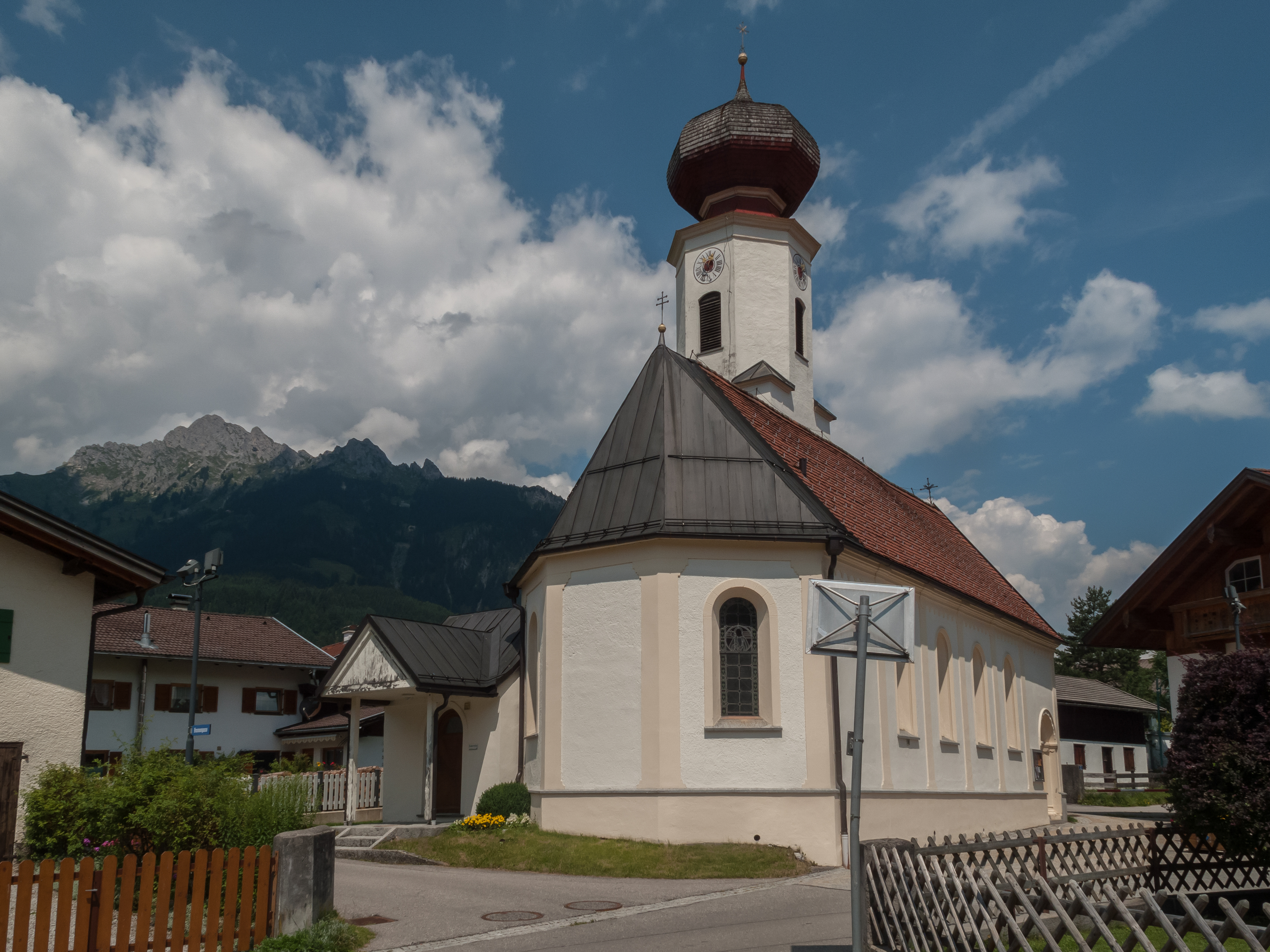
Höfen, church: katholische Filialkirche Maria Hilf

== Geography ==
Höfen lies southwest of Reutte on the left bank of the Lech.
