= Plaion =

Austrian media company

Plaion GmbH
- Formerly: Koch Media (1994–2022)
- Type: Subsidiary
- Industry: Mass media
- Founded: 1994; 32 years ago
- Founders: Franz Koch; Klemens Kundratitz
- Headquarters: Höfen, Austria
- Key people: Phil Rogers (CEO); Reinhard Gratl (CFO); Stefan Kapelari (COO)
- Number of employees: 1,976 (2021)
- Parent: Embracer Group (2018–present)
- Divisions: Deep Silver; Prime Matter; Ravenscourt
- Subsidiaries: 18point2; Development Plus; Gaya Entertainment; Milestone; Plaion Pictures; Splatter Connect; Vertigo Games; Voxler
- Website: plaion.com

Plaion GmbH (formerly Koch Media) is an Austrian media company headquartered in Höfen, Tyrol, with an additional office in Planegg, Germany. It was founded in 1994 by Franz Koch and Klemens Kundratitz. The company operates video game publishing labels Deep Silver, Prime Matter and Ravenscourt, the video game developer Milestone, as well as a film distribution arm, Plaion Pictures. Koch Media's parent company, Koch Media Holding, was acquired by Swedish holding company Embracer Group (then known as THQ Nordic AB) in February 2018.

== History ==
=== Early history (1994–2015) ===
Former Koch Media logo

Koch Media was founded in 1994 by Franz Koch (founder of Koch International) and his business partner, Klemens Kundratitz to market and distribute software. Koch Media operated out of offices in Germany and Austria, while a regional subsidiary, Koch Media Ltd., was opened in England. In 1995, Koch Media sold more than 250,000 software licenses, and in 1996, the company began distributing video games. Another regional subsidiary, Koch Media AG, was formed in Switzerland in 1998. A holding company, Koch Media Holding, was established in 2000 to unite Koch Media's business areas. The same year, Koch Media srl was formed as a regional subsidiary for Italy.

In 2002, Koch Media established Deep Silver as a video game publishing division to "complement games that [Koch Media] was distributing". A film division, Koch Home Entertainment, was announced in June 2003 and formally formed in early October. A game label for mass-market games, Fantastic.tv, was announced in November 2003. In October 2005, Koch Media acquired French distributor SG Diffusion, which had recently signed with NCsoft to distribute their game Guild Wars. SG Diffusion was renamed Koch Media SAS in January 2006. In February 2006, they established Koch Media Licensing GmbH as their license holding subsidiary. Another game label, named Spielen wir (lit. "Let's Play"), was created in July 2008 to publish casual games under. The same month, Koch Media acquired Proein, the Spanish distribution arm of SCi Entertainment, to undisclosed terms. Proein was renamed Koch Media S.L.U. in January 2009. Regional offices for Scandinavian and Benelux countries, operated by the England subsidiary, were opened in February and July that year, respectively. In March 2012, Koch Media had 250 employees. The creation of another game publishing label named Ravenscourt, focusing on simulation games, was announced in March 2015. In August 2015, Koch Media Licensing GmbH was renamed Koch Films GmbH and absorbed the operations of the former Koch Home Entertainment division.

=== Under Embracer Group (2018–present) ===
On 14 February 2018, Koch Media Holding was acquired by THQ Nordic AB (later known as Embracer Group), a Swedish video game holding company. The purchase agreement was signed at 8:00 AM, and the deal was announced that same day. The deal comprised a purchase price of €91.5 million, split into €66 million in cash paid at closure of the deal (which was expected to occur later on the same day), €9.5 million in stock to be paid by 15 June 2018, and another €16 million in cash to be paid by 14 August 2018. The total consideration for Koch Media's share capital amounted to €121 million on a cash and debt-free basis.

Koch and Kundratitz had owned 90% and 10% in the company, respectively, and both of them sold their shares, and THQ Nordic AB became the sole owner of the company. According to manager Reinhard Gratl, the sale primarily came about because Koch wanted to retire, and no one in his family was interested in taking over the business. He asked for all money to be paid to Koch Media instead of him, so the company could profit from the deal. Koch resigned from Koch Media on the same day. Koch Media's management, consisting of chief executive officer Kundratitz, chief financial officer Gratl and chief operating officer Stefan Kapelari, was subsequently joined by THQ Nordic AB's Erik Stenberg.

On 13 February 2019, Koch Media entered into an agreement to acquire Czech developer Warhorse Studios. Warhorse's game Kingdom Come: Deliverance had been co-published by Deep Silver exactly one year prior, and Koch Media paid €42.8 million, equal to Warhorse's 2018 earnings, to seize ownership over the studio and its intellectual property. The acquisition closed later that day. Also on the same day, it was announced that Koch Media had also acquired 18point2, an Australian publishing partner, for €1.9 million, aiming at establishing a stronger presence in the Australian market for Koch Media. The two acquisitions added 120 and 8 employees, respectively, to Koch Media's staff.

In June 2019, THQ Nordic AB acquired KSM GmbH, a German distributor of anime films, from its founder and chief executive officer (CEO), Benjamin Krause. KSM is to be merged into Koch Films. Also acquired was Gaya Entertainment, a merchandise production company; Nordic Games Group, a holding company controlled by THQ Nordic AB CEO Lars Wingefors, sold the subsidiary to THQ Nordic AB for €1 at the end of the latter's first fiscal quarter of 2019. Gaya Entertainment is to be consolidated with Koch Media's operations. On 14 August 2019, Koch Media agreed to fully acquire racing game developer Milestone srl and all of its intellectual property for €44.9 million paid in cash. The acquisition was completed later that day.

Koch Films acquired Sola Media, a Stuttgart, Germany-based television-and-film licenser for children and family properties, in August 2020. Later that month, Koch Media opened offices in Hong Kong and Tokyo, both headed by Kundratitz, to expand publishing operations in Southeast Asia.

In September 2020, Koch Media acquired Vertigo Games, who develops, publishes, and distributes games exclusively for virtual reality platforms, including Arizona Sunshine and After the Fall.

In November 2020, Koch Media acquired Flying Wild Hog.

In March 2021, Koch Media signed a €50 million co-publishing deal with Starbreeze Studios to finance the production, release, and post-launch support of Payday 3, with Starbreeze Studios retaining ownership of the IP.

Koch Media opened a new publishing division, Prime Matter, in June 2021, operating from its Munich headquarters. Prime Matter was announced to include some previous publishing agreement and Warhorse's future games, which were previously of Deep Silver.

=== Rebranding as Plaion ===
On 4 August 2022, Koch Media rebranded themselves as Plaion. In October 2022, Plaion Pictures acquired British anime distribution company Anime Limited for an undisclosed sum. In May 2023, Gamesindustry.biz learned of plans to dissolve Deep Silver, Ravenscourt and Prime Matter, and consolidate the publishing business under the "Plaion" label.

In January 2025, Kundratitz announced he was stepping down as CEO, and would be transferring leadership to Phil Rogers in April.

On 19 December 2025, Plaion Pictures had agreed to a deal for Toho to sell a 100% equity share in Anime Limited for an undisclosed amount. Through the deal, Anime Limited will be a fully-owned subsidiary of the newly-formed Toho Global and will expand Toho's operations to Europe.

== Offices ==
As of February 2018, Plaion is headquartered in Höfen, a municipality with a population of roughly 1,200 people that is located in Austria's Tyrol region and close to Bavaria, Germany. In Höfen, Plaion occupies an office complex in which the company employs 150 people in various departments. The property, as well as an adjacent 7,000 square metres (75,000 sq ft) plot, is owned by Embracer Group. In Planegg, a municipality in Bavaria that is located close to Munich, Plaion operates a subsidiary branch also called Plaion GmbH.

== Subsidiaries ==
Division	Subsidiary	Location	Founded/Acquired	Ref.
Plaion Pictures	Sola Media	Stuttgart	August 2020	
Plaion Pictures	Spotfilm Networx	Berlin	December 2021	
Vertigo Games	Vertigo Arcade	Rotterdam / Los Angeles / Amsterdam	September 2020	
Vertigo Games	Vertigo Publishing	Rotterdam / Los Angeles / Amsterdam	September 2020	
Vertigo Games	Vertigo Studios	Rotterdam / Los Angeles / Amsterdam	September 2020	
DPI Merchandising		California	March 2022	
DigixArt		Montpellier	August 2021	
Milestone		Milan	August 2019	
Prime Matter		Munich	June 2021	
Ravenscourt		Munich	2014	
Splatter Connect		Manchester	October 2021	
Voxler		Paris / Marseille	February 2020	

=== Divested subsidiaries ===
Division	Subsidiary	Location	Founded/Acquired	Divested	Ref.
Deep Silver	Deep Silver Vienna	Vienna	August 2007	February 2010	
Deep Silver	Volition	Champaign	January 2013	November 2022	
Deep Silver	Free Radical Design	Nottingham	May 2021	December 2023	
Plaion Pictures	Anime Limited	Glasgow / Paris / San Francisco	October 2022	December 2025	
Plaion Pictures	KSM	Planegg	August 2019	December 2019	

== See also ==
- List of Deep Silver games
- List of Prime Matter games
- List of Ravenscourt games
