= Mike Marr =

Mike Marr is the Director of Product Development for Novel, Inc. a videogame and enterprise simulation developer in the Seattle area. As Director of Product Development, he is responsible for management of the design team, company direction, culture, and creation of new intellectual properties.

Marr's background includes experience designing massively multiplayer strategy games, real time strategy and role playing game titles. He has also worked as a UI engineer, tools programmer, and online technologies consultant.

Other titles Marr has worked on include strategy games such as Gas Powered Games’ Supreme Commander, and SSI’s Panzer General, role-playing games such as Demigod, Dungeon Siege II and Space Siege, Supreme Commander: Forged Alliance, as well as MMO games such as Empire & State, Electronic Arts' The Sims Online, Earth & Beyond and Motor City Online.
