= Chris Taylor (video game designer) =

Canadian video game designer

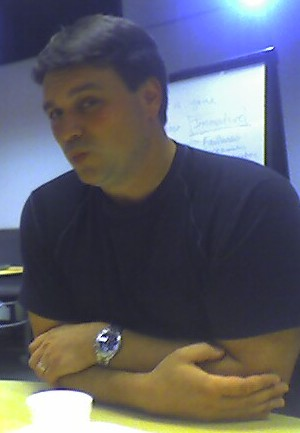
- Taylor in 2006
- Born: British Columbia, Canada
- Citizenship: Canada
- Occupation: Video game developer
- Known for: Co-founder of Gas Powered Games
- Notable work: Total Annihilation; Dungeon Siege; Supreme Commander
- Spouse: Kimberly Taylor

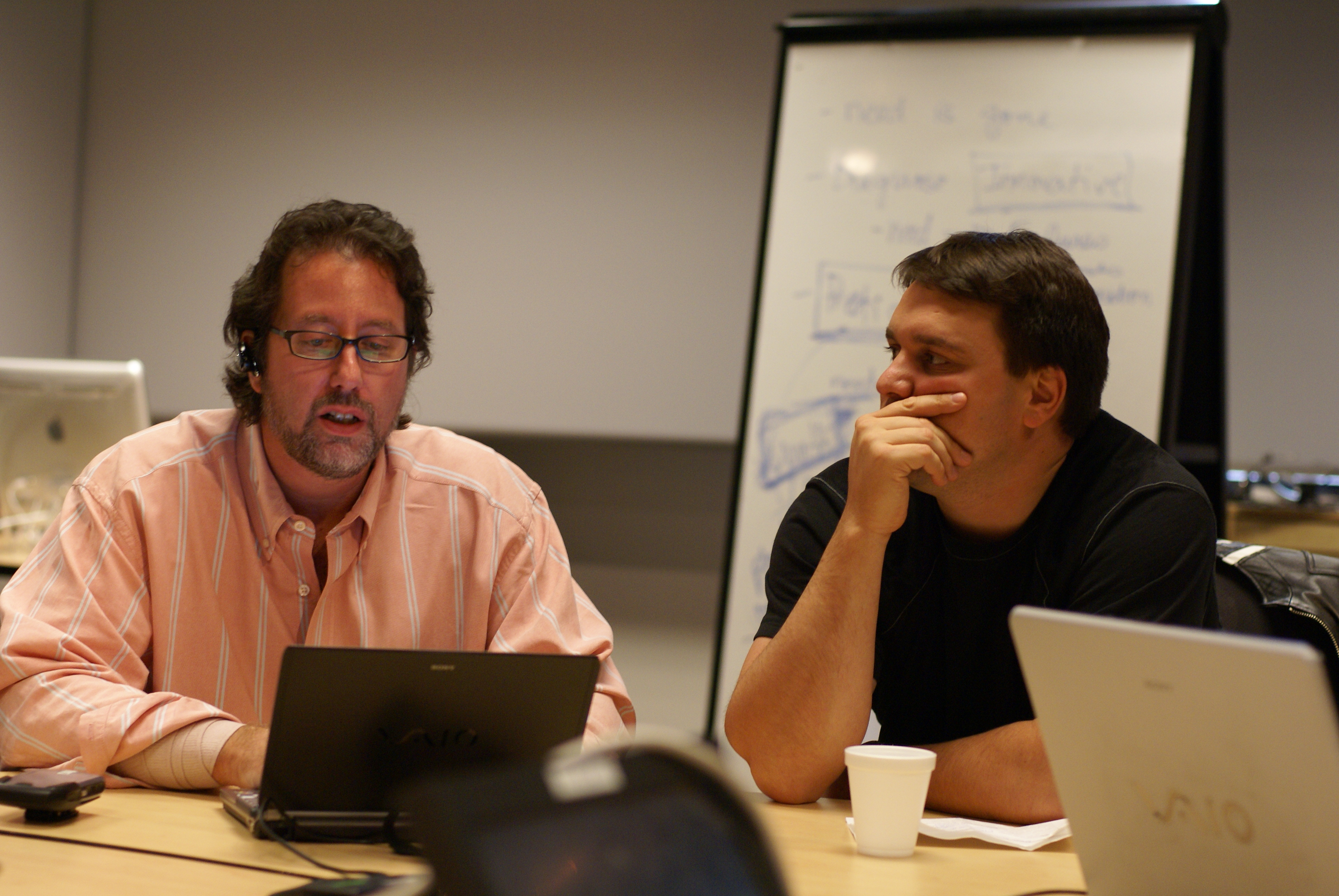
Jordan Weisman and Chris Taylor at USC IMD in October 2006

Chris Taylor is a Canadian video game designer best known for Total Annihilation and the Dungeon Siege and Supreme Commander series and co-founding the now-defunct studio Gas Powered Games. In 2002, GameSpy named him the "30th most influential person in gaming." In 2019, he revealed he has been working on Kanoogi, a cloud-based gaming platform, and developing his next game, Intergalactic Space Empire.

== Career ==
Taylor was born in British Columbia and started in the video game industry in the late 1980s at Distinctive Software in Burnaby. His first game was Hardball II released in 1989. Taylor moved to Seattle, Washington in January 1996 when he joined Cavedog Entertainment as the designer and project leader for the real-time strategy video game Total Annihilation and its first expansion, Total Annihilation: The Core Contingency. He left Cavedog in March 1998 and later founded Gas Powered Games two months later in May where he designed the action role-playing game Dungeon Siege. Its sequel, Dungeon Siege II, was released in 2005.

In the August 2005 edition of PC Gamer, it was announced that Gas Powered Games was developing Supreme Commander, Taylor's first real-time strategy game since 1997. It is described as the spiritual successor to Total Annihilation, but was not able to be named as such because Atari (formerly Infogrames) owns the rights to the Total Annihilation name. Although Atari has shown no interest in reviving the Total Annihilation franchise, the company nonetheless held on to it until July 2013. He helped create the game's standalone expansion Supreme Commander: Forged Alliance.

On January 14, 2013, Taylor funded a new project through Kickstarter, called Wildman. On February 11, 2013, Taylor shut down the kickstarter for Wildman prematurely. Four days before the campaign's end the pledged amount was only $504,120 of the required $1.1 million.

Shortly thereafter in 2013, Gas Powered Games was acquired by Wargaming, where Taylor was reported to be working on an unannounced project. Taylor left Wargaming in November 2016 with a forward looking statement to be part of indie gaming.

On April 24, 2019, Taylor unveiled Intergalactic Space Empire, a new real-time strategy game, while also announcing Kanoogi, a cloud-based gaming platform. Kanoogi will debut with Intergalactic Space Empire as its first title, with intentions to support a wider range of games in the future.

== Awards ==
Supreme Commander, released in 2007, has been dubbed "best RTS of E3 2006," the GameCritics Best Strategy Game Award and achieving high ratings from major game websites and magazines.

== Games credited ==
Year	Title	Role	Developer
1989	HardBall II	Designer, programmer	Distinctive Software
1989	The Duel: Test Drive II	Designer, programmer	Distinctive Software
1991	4D Sports Boxing	Designer, programmer	Distinctive Software
1995	Triple Play Baseball '96	Designer, programmer	Extended Play
1997	Total Annihilation	Director	Cavedog Entertainment
1998	Total Annihilation: The Core Contingency	Director	Cavedog Entertainment
2002	Dungeon Siege	Director	Gas Powered Games
2003	Dungeon Siege: Legends of Arana	Executive producer	Gas Powered Games
2005	Dungeon Siege II	Creative director	Gas Powered Games
2006	Dungeon Siege: Throne of Agony	Creative director	SuperVillain Studios
2006	Dungeon Siege II: Broken World	Creative director	Gas Powered Games
2007	Supreme Commander	Lead designer	Gas Powered Games
2007	Supreme Commander: Forged Alliance	Creative director	Gas Powered Games
2008	Space Siege	Creative director	Gas Powered Games
2009	Demigod	Creative director	Gas Powered Games
2010	Supreme Commander 2	Lead designer	Gas Powered Games
2011	Dungeon Siege III	Adviser	Obsidian Entertainment
2011	Age of Empires Online	Creative director	Robot Entertainment; Gas Powered Games
TBA	Intergalactic Space Empire	—N/a	—N/a
Cancelled	Chris Taylor's Kings and Castles	—N/a	Gas Powered Games
Cancelled	Wildman	Project lead, Lead designer	Gas Powered Games
