= Chris Taylor's Kings and Castles =

- Developer: Gas Powered Games
- Platforms: Microsoft Windows, Xbox 360
- Release: Cancelled
- Genre: Real-time strategy
- Modes: Single-player, multiplayer

Chris Taylor's Kings and Castles was a real-time strategy (RTS) video game that was in development by Gas Powered Games. Development of the game was announced on 15 February 2010 via press release, then put on hold indefinitely in 2013, and ultimately was cancelled when the company was closed in 2018.

== Gameplay ==
Although specific gameplay details are few, the game represented a departure from Gas Powered Games prior RTS series, Supreme Commander, given a new setting in a fantasy universe. This was similar to the transition made by Total Annihilation: Kingdoms after the original Total Annihilation (both running on the same engine, the latter designed by Chris Taylor).

== Plot ==
According to Gas Powered Games' presentations on the game, the plot of the single-player campaign would have been woven across three separate kings/kingdoms into one overarching storyline. Specific plot details never surfaced.

== Marketing and development ==
The game was extensively marketed in 2010 via a variety of social media channels, including an official video blog, company Facebook page, game Facebook page, and official Twitter account (@GasPoweredGames). Gas Powered Games CEO Chris Taylor has promoted the game and provided details through interviews and industry events.

The game was put on hold pending the completion of Gas Powered Games role in the development of Age of Empires Online. However, even after the completion and release of Age of Empires Online, it was still on hold indefinitely until the game was cancelled when the company was shuttered in July 2018.
