= Dungeon Siege III =

2011 video game

- European cover art
- Developer: Obsidian Entertainment
- Publisher: Square Enix
- Director: Richard Taylor
- Producers: David Baker; John Lee; Greg Lutton
- Designers: Nathaniel Chapman; Tyson Christensen
- Programmer: Richard Taylor
- Artist: Justin Cherry
- Writers: George Ziets; John Gonzalez; Travis Stout
- Composers: Jason Graves; Tim Wynn
- Series: Dungeon Siege
- Platforms: Microsoft Windows, PlayStation 3, Xbox 360
- Release: AU: June 16, 2011; EU: June 17, 2011; NA: June 21, 2011; JP: July 28, 2011
- Genre: Action role-playing
- Modes: Single-player, multiplayer

Dungeon Siege III is an action role-playing game developed by Obsidian Entertainment. It was published by Square Enix for PlayStation 3, Xbox 360 and Microsoft Windows in June 2011. It is the third full and fifth overall release in the Dungeon Siege series of video games and the first since Dungeon Siege: Throne of Agony in 2006. The game is set in the pseudo-medieval kingdom of Ehb, 150 years after the events of Dungeon Siege and follows descendants of survivors of the 10th Legion in their quest to reestablish their military force.

The game employs classical role-playing elements in a high fantasy setting. Players control one of four characters, with one of the other three either controlled by the computer or another player using multiplayer features. When playing in single-player mode, players can readily switch out the supporting character at any time but unlike previous games in the series, only one companion character can be in the game at one time. Dungeon Siege III features an extensive set of items such as armor, weapons and jewelry that can be used to influence the characters' abilities and traits with each character having their own unique set of clothing, armor and weapons.

Dungeon Siege III was announced in June 2010 as the first main entry in the series not to be developed by Gas Powered Games following a purchase of the rights to the series by Square Enix earlier that year. The game was instead developed by Obsidian Entertainment with Chris Taylor, the inventor of the Dungeon Siege franchise, serving as an adviser. The game received above-average reviews by critics who praised the game's mechanics and graphics, especially the character models. Opinions about the story, replay value and multiplayer system were mixed on the other hand.

== Gameplay ==
Dungeon Siege III is an action role-playing game that takes place in a fantasy medieval world with geographic variety in open and closed environments (dungeons). The game displays the game world from an isometric (top-down) perspective and uses a display engine that makes the entire experience seamless by constantly loading required game scenes in the background. This way, the game does not need any load screens often found in other games. The game also avoids using many cut scenes by having characters talk to each other while traveling.

The game features a control system created to accommodate the parallel release on consoles as well as on the PC. As such, unlike previous games in the series, Dungeon Siege III no longer features an automatic targeting system and point-and-click mechanics. Instead, the player moves their character using the keyboard or a controller and the screen will move to stay centered on the character. To fight, player have to point the character in the direction of the enemies they want to engage and press the attack button.

The player character uses the block-system to defend against an attacking enemy while the AI controlled companion (left) shoots at the enemies from a distance. The visual design of the characters and weapons, the graphical effects and the AI's effective control over the companion character were positively noted by reviewers.

Players control one of four predefined characters chosen at the beginning of the game. The other three appear as non-player characters (NPCs). In single-player mode only one of computer-controlled NPCs accompanies the player character at any given time, although the active companion can be changed at any time. This distinguishes the game from previous Dungeon Siege titles, where multiple characters could be in the game at the same time. If either the player or their companion die, they can be revived by the surviving character. If both die, the game has to be restarted from the last location it was saved. The AI is programmed to effectively use a companion's skills to complement the player, such as by waiting for the right time to use abilities or only attempting to revive the player when no more enemies are in the area.

Each character has two fighting stances to handle different situations. For example, the character of Lucas can wield a two-handed sword to damage a lot of enemies at once but with less protection, or use a one-handed sword and shield to fight against single strong enemies or to block attacks. In addition, there are three different special abilities for each stance that require "focus", the game's equivalent to magic points, to use. The amount of focus required varies based on the ability used. Each of those abilities has an improved version available after meeting certain conditions, such as using the skill a certain number of times. There are also three different passive abilities (such as healing, increased armor etc.). The improved versions of the attack abilities and the passive abilities use a different system of power spheres. All improved and passive abilities will deplete such a sphere. Both the focus points and the spheres are refilled by fighting enemies. While amount of focus available will always be a maximum of 100%, the player will start with only one sphere and gain three additional ones at key points of the plot, regardless of their level or experience points. Additionally, players collect experience points for defeating enemies and completing quests which in turn increase the character's level. At each new level, the player can choose to improve one of ten different beneficial effects for the character, such as improved attacks, bonus effects when being hit etc.

On the console versions, a second player can control the companion character using a second controller at the same device. Additionally, using the online multiplayer feature, up to four players can play the campaign together, with the difficulty being adjusted accordingly. However, since players can join and leave at any time, the game will only save progress for the player who initiated the game, not the other players. If a player leave or goes inactive, the game's AI will take over. When multiple players play together, they can vote on which quests to accept or how to handle different story-related decisions. Throughout the game, the game asks the player to make decisions using a wheel-like interface reminiscent of the Mass Effect series that can affect events later in the game.

Each of the four characters features nine unique sets of equipment, meaning that (with the exception of rings) no piece of equipment can be used by any of the other characters. Items can be obtained as a reward for winning fights, looted from fallen enemies and bought with gold, the game's currency, from vendors, special non-player characters that can be found in various locations. Vendors will also buy excess gear from player. Additionally, the game features a "transmute item" option, allowing the player to transmute their items into gold instantly at any time, albeit for a lower amount than they would have received if sold to a vendor. Unlike other role-playing games, including previous Dungeon Siege titles, the game does not feature any items that allow instant regeneration of health, focus or power spheres such as "health potions". Instead, there are abilities characters can use to replenish health over time.

== Synopsis ==
=== Setting and characters ===
The game takes place in the fictional Kingdom of Ehb in a high fantasy world, roughly 150 years after the events of Dungeon Siege. 30 years before the events of Dungeon Siege III, the 10th Legion, a military force that provided stability and protection for the kingdom for 400 years, attempted to remove King Hendrick from the throne to replace him with his son. The mission went wrong and Hendrick was slain. His illegitimate daughter, Jeyne Kassynder, then rallied the people and the Azunite Church against the Legion. Following a long and brutal campaign, she managed to kill most of the Legion. The king and his family moved against Kassynder but were killed save for his daughter Roslyn, the legitimate heir. Rosyln was forced to flee into the mines with the remnant of her army. A small group of legionnaires remained, led by a man calling himself the Venerable Odo, a former Legion spy. He kept descendants of the Legion safe from Kassynder and, at the beginning of the game, calls them to meet in order to regroup the Legion.

The player can choose to play as one of four different characters:

- Lucas Montbarron is the youngest son of Hugh Montbarron, the Grand Master of the 10th Legion at the time of their last fight against Jeyne Kassynder and a descendant of the first Lady Montbarron, the protagonist of Dungeon Siege. Lucas fights with a one-handed sword and shield or a two-handed sword.
- Anjali is an archon, a member of a servant race to the lost creator gods. As a mythical being, she can shift between human form and elemental fire form.
- Reinhart Manx is a descendant of Merik, the mage from Dungeon Siege. He is able to fight with magic at range and in close combat.
- Katarina is the illegitimate daughter of Hugh Montbarron and a Lescanzi witch. She fights with a long-range rifle or a pair of shotguns at close range. Rebecca Grant modeled for Katarina's character.

Depending on which character is chosen, the plot is subtly altered. The other three characters are later available as AI-controlled companions or can be controlled by other players using the multiplayer feature. As the game progresses and different quests are completed, the other three characters will first meet and then join the player character. Depending on which character was chosen, some events encounters might be subtly changed and the lines of dialogue are altered to fit the character's back-story; for example, while Lucas, Anjali and Reinhart will meet Katarina for the first time in the town of Raven's Rill helping them, players who chose to play as Katarina will meet a non-player character serving the same purpose.

=== Plot ===
The player arrives to find the meeting place attacked by Kassynder's mercenaries. With the help of Marten Guiscard, another Legion descendant, the player tracks down Odo at a former Legion safehouse. After hearing what happened, the player is tasked with finding other survivors and information on the attacks. After fighting more of Kassynder's forces, the player travels to Stonebridge City to reopen the Legion's Grand Chapter-house there as a sign of their resurgence. On the way to Stonebridge they help a group of royalist soldiers fighting Kassynder.

After reopening the Stonebridge chapter-house, the player seeks to enlist the support of the royalists by aiding Queen Roslyn against Kassynder's assault on her position and the help of the City of Stonebridge by helping the city council. Their support ensured, the player attacks Kassynder's capital. After prevailing against Kassynder in battle, she is revealed to be an archon who was seeking to reawaken her long lost masters in the Rukkenvahl Forest, but only managed to create a mutant god. After it is defeated, Kassynder is captured alive in the forest. The player may then choose to either kill or spare Jeyne; if her life is spared, the player can decide to have her stand trial, deliver her to the Queen, exile her or ask for her help in rebuilding the kingdom. The game ends with Odo narrating the events that happen afterwards based on the player's choices in the game.

== Development and release ==
In 2010, Square Enix purchased the rights to the Dungeon Siege franchise from Gas Powered Games. Square Enix announced in June 2010 that they commissioned Obsidian Entertainment, which had previous experience creating role-playing games such as Neverwinter Nights 2 and Fallout: New Vegas, with developing Dungeon Siege III. Chris Taylor, the original creator of Dungeon Siege, served as an advisor during the development of the game. It is the third game in the series and the first main entry title not to be developed by Gas Powered Games (after Dungeon Siege: Legends of Aranna by Mad Doc Software and Dungeon Siege: Throne of Agony by SuperVillain Studios). It was also the first major game of the series that was developed for Xbox 360, PlayStation 3 and Windows PC while the first two entries were PC-exclusive.

For Dungeon Siege III, Obsidian used its own proprietary Onyx Engine, allowing the developers to create graphically appealing settings. A first preview was shown at E3 2010, in June 2010. At this point, Obsidian was still working with character classes and not predefined characters, previewing two such classes. Further details about the game's co-op mode were revealed in April 2011, shortly before the game's release a month later, including the ability to vote on choices.

Originally slated for release on May 27, 2011, the game's release was delayed until June 16, 2011 in Australia, June 17, 2011 in Europe, most of Asia and South Africa, June 21, 2011 in North America and July 28, 2011 in Japan. A three-issue mini-series also titled Dungeon Siege III was released digitally by Dark Horse Comics. A printed fourth edition was available as a pre-order bonus from Walmart.

After the release, a number of players complained about the controls on the PC version of the game, prompting the developer Obsidian Entertainment to address those concerns.

=== Treasures of the Sun ===
Dungeon Siege III: Treasures of the Sun was released on October 25, 2011 as downloadable content (DLC) for Dungeon Siege III. It features a new location, several new monster types, three new obtainable perks, and raises the level cap to 35. The story follows the protagonist(s) on a journey to Aranoi desert, where an undead outbreak is taking place, in search of a long lost Legion spy and the mysterious "greatest treasure of the Azunite church". The downloadable content offers approximately five hours of added play time to the base game.

== Reception ==
Reception

Aggregate score
Aggregator	Score		
Aggregator	PC	PS3	Xbox 360
Metacritic	72/100	71/100	72/100

Review scores
Publication	Score		
Publication	PC	PS3	Xbox 360
Destructoid	N/A	N/A	7.5/10
Eurogamer	N/A	8/10	N/A
Game Informer	8/10	8/10	8/10
GameRevolution	B	B	B
GameSpot	6/10	6.5/10	6.5/10
GameSpy	3.5/5	N/A	N/A
GameTrailers	N/A	N/A	6.3/10
IGN	6.5/10	6.5/10	6.5/10
Joystiq	N/A	N/A	3.5/5
Official Xbox Magazine (US)	N/A	N/A	8.5/10
PC Gamer (UK)	78%	N/A	N/A
PlayStation: The Official Magazine	N/A	7/10	N/A
RPGamer	N/A	4/5	N/A
RPGFan	70%	N/A	85%
Digital Spy	N/A	3/5	N/A
The Escapist	N/A	N/A	3.5/5

Dungeon Siege III received "mixed or average reviews" on all platforms according to the review aggregation website Metacritic. In Japan, Famitsu gave it a score of 30 out of 40, while Famitsu X360 gave the Xbox 360 version a score of one seven, one eight, and two sevens for a total of 29 out of 40.

The game's graphics were praised by reviewers, with critics especially noting the landscape as well as light and shadow effects. Reviewers also positively noted the visual design of the characters and of the various gear, with GameSpot pointing out that items get more visually impressive as the game progresses. The differences between the console versions were thought to be marginal at best, although Eurogamer pointed out that the frame rate was capped at 30 frames per second on the Xbox 360 while it fluctuated on the PlayStation 3, thus making the Xbox version appear more consistent. Rock Paper Shotgun also bemoaned that on PC the game does not allow 16:10 aspect ratios, controls cannot be changed to different keys, and there are only two zoom settings, indicating that the PC version was considered less important by the developers than the console versions.

The voice acting received mixed responses, with Memeburn remarking that it helps the characters more than the story does while Joystiq called it "horrible". The music and soundtrack were described as "decent" and doing its job but not exceptional.

The loot system was often considered too complicated with too many items and not enough discernible differences and a difficult to manage inventory. Reviewers also were confused by the game using a lot of different statistics on inventory items there were not explained, such as "doom", "chaos" or "momentum" and thus does not allow players to adequately know what items to choose. The skill system on the other hand was considered refreshing and intriguing by many reviewers, especially the amount of customization it allowed.

Most reviewers were satisfied with the fighting system, with Game Informer lauding Obsidian's approach that forces the player to actively be involved in the battle in order to be able to use abilities instead of waiting for some kind of mana system to recharge. Similarly, GameSpy liked that the combat system combines healing with fighting instead of using items to heal characters and thus forces players to keep fighting in order to replenish their health instead of trying to avoid confrontations at low health like in other games. IGN emphasized that the fighting system is more natural and like an action game than a traditional dungeon crawler and that by varying stances and abilities the game manages to keep players interested in combat although they also bemoaned that in the later stages of the game, when an ability set has been unlocked completely, the interest might wane. Reviewers also lauded the game's AI controlling the player's companion for acting both autonomously and effective and how the various characters complement each other.

Some critics found the story compelling and interesting, with PC Gamer expressing surprise that the game features both memorable characters and choices that actually impact the game. Game Informer highlighted the steampunk-accents of the game's world and praised setting and characters while considering the story not as interesting. On the other hand, several reviewers did not find the story particularly interesting and too linear with the quests offering little variety from the standard "kill something" or "retrieve items"; IGN called the story tedious and both GameSpot and GameSpy found both the story and the characters uninteresting. The Telegraph (giving it eight out of ten) found the story simpler than in Obsidian's previous game, Fallout: New Vegas, and that choices only have cosmetic consequences but thought the story fitting for the game; this sentiment was largely shared by Rock Paper Shotgun in their review. IGN also thought there is no incentive to replay the game or continue exploring the game's world, while others thought the alterations provided by the four different characters does provide some replay value. Critics also considered the game's length too short, especially compared to its predecessors.

Reviewers also liked the multiplayer system, explicitly noting how easy it is for others to join, while also bemoaning that progress is not saved for other players. Memeburn on the other hand considered multiplayer a "waste of time" and criticized Obsidian for forgetting to implement obvious safeguards, mentioning that anyone can join a game and sell off all the player's items before exiting again. The restricted camera in co-op mode, forcing all characters to be on the same screen, was criticized by many reviewers as unnecessarily limiting and potentially confusing. The game's artificial intelligence was considered up to the task, with critics praising that the AI-controlled second character is usually well designed and capable of making smart choices when using character abilities.

GameZone gave the game 8.5 out of 10, calling it "a game worthy of your attention if you like the hack-and-slash, dungeon crawl, action-rpg [sic] type of game. There's no fighting over the massive amount of loot you'll come across, and most of all, IT'S FUN! Minus story fluff, inconsequential dialogue, and an unruly, this game gets a lot of things right, or is on the right path with a lot of things." Edge gave the PlayStation 3 version a score of seven out of ten, saying, "It's a game built from pluck and resourcefulness, in other words: thoughtful when it can afford to be and stoically reliable – for the most part – when it can't." GamePro gave the game three stars out of five, calling it "an ambitious game, to be sure, and it brings a lot of nifty innovations to the action-RPG genre. In fact, it brings too darn many -- that is, it bites off more than its control system, or the average player, can chew."

Samantha Nelson of The A.V. Club gave the Xbox 360 version a B+, saying, "Dungeon Siege III isn't extraordinary, but is it a highly satisfying way to spend time gaming with a friend or three." Dan Watson of 411Mania gave it 7.5 out of 10, saying, "There is definitely something here to be found, however, it isn't the solid game it could be if they would have just tweaked a few issues. Would it have been so hard to allow people to bring their own character into other games? Would it have been hard to make the camera independent? Give it a rental and see what you think." Susan Arendt of The Escapist gave it three-and-a-half stars out of five, saying, "I love playing Dungeon Siege III despite its many flaws, and if you don't mind that the overall experience is pretty shallow and meant for single player, you probably will, too."

Marc Saltzman of Common Sense Media gave the PlayStation 3 version a score of four stars out of five, calling it "a fun and frantic 'RPG lite' with great co-op play." David Jenkins of Metro gave the same console version a score of seven out of ten, saying, "The best Dungeon Siege ever is a more of a compliment than you might think in this accessible and fun action role-player." However, Mark Langshaw of Digital Spy gave it three stars out of five, saying, "One of the most disappointing aspects of Dungeon Siege III is the seemingly pointless restrictions imposed on co-op play."
