= In the Name of the King 3: The Last Mission =

- Official DVD cover
- Directed by: Uwe Boll
- Written by: Joel Ross
- Based on: Dungeon Siege by Gas Powered Games
- Produced by: Uwe Boll; Dan Clarke; Gary Otto; Tatyana Pedersen; Jonathan Shore; Dessy Sims
- Starring: Dominic Purcell; Ralitsa Paskaleva; Daria Simeonova
- Cinematography: Mathias Neumann
- Edited by: Thomas Sabinsky
- Music by: Jessica de Rooij
- Production company: Boll KG Productions / Herold Productions / Event Film Distribution
- Distributed by: 20th Century Fox Home Entertainment
- Release date: February 5, 2014 (Sweden DVD)
- Running time: 86 minutes
- Countries: Canada; United States; Bulgaria
- Language: English
- Budget: $3.5 million

In the Name of the King 3: The Last Mission is a 2014 action fantasy film directed by Uwe Boll. Starring Dominic Purcell, it is the third installment in the In the Name of the King film series, and the sequel to 2011's In the Name of the King 2: Two Worlds.

== Plot ==
Hazen Kaine is a ruthless modern-day assassin, wanting out, and determined to quit the business after carrying out one last job involving a European royal family: kidnapping the two daughters. Hazen easily completes this task, and locks the two girls in a connex box and discovers that one of the girls is wearing a necklace with a charm that looks similar to a tattoo he has and takes the charm from the young girl, which opens a portal to the Middle Ages.

Once there Hazen soon gains his bearing and realizes quickly that a village before him is being attacked by a dragon. Hazen runs to the village when he see that the dragon has noticed him and now attacks him too. He uses his pistol to fire at the dragon. When the two sisters Arabella and Emeline notice this, they call to him and bring him into their home for safety. The sisters soon take him to their shaman where he finds out he was chosen to return to the Middle Ages and bring back order to a kingdom in chaos.

Hazen comes to realize that he must stand against the evil King Tervon (Marian Valev), who has seized that kingdom. He and the sisters form an army and head for Tervon's castle, but are ambushed by the king's armies. After a serious battle, Hazen faces and easily defeats Tervon in a duel. It is also revealed the dragon which attacked the village earlier is actually controlled by Tervon, who calls upon it to make his escape when he is defeated in the duel. Now as Hazen finds himself up against an evil king, his armies, and the dragon he controls, he realizes that he must fight on the side of good. He and Arabella finally reach Tervon's castle and Hazen defeats and kills him with ease.

Arabella tells him he must save the girls he locked in the connex box. Hazen returns to his time, but the dragon, now under no one's controlm follows him, trying to kill him, as well as the men who hired him as an assassin. He finds the man who hired him holding the girls at gunpoint, and he fights the remaining henchmen and one of them is carried off by the dragon, which heads off some place unknown. Hazen returns the girls home, and their father allows him to leave unharmed, for which Hazen thanks him and walks off. In the final shot, the dragon is seen flying overhead in the background.

== Cast ==
- Dominic Purcell as Hazen Kaine
- Ralitsa Paskaleva as Arabella
- Daria Simeonova as Emeline
- Marian Valev as King Tervon
