= Space Siege =

2008 video game

- Developer: Gas Powered Games
- Publisher: Sega
- Designers: Chris Taylor; Mike Marr
- Composers: David Arkenstone; Howard Mostrom
- Platform: Microsoft Windows
- Release: NA: August 12, 2008; EU: August 22, 2008; AU: August 28, 2008
- Genre: Action role-playing
- Modes: Single-player, multiplayer

Space Siege is a 2008 action role-playing game developed by Chris Taylor and Gas Powered Games, published by Sega. The title is a play on the Dungeon Siege series, which is also produced by Gas Powered Games.

Space Siege takes place on a massive space colonization ship under attack by an alien foe that has annihilated the planet Earth before the game begins. Players have the choice to replace body parts with cybernetically enhanced components throughout the game, to more effectively counter the alien threat at the sacrifice of some of their humanity. Whichever path they choose, players can upgrade their robotic sidekick, powered armor, and weapons.

== Plot ==
Space Siege takes place in the far future, where Earth has just been destroyed by the Kerak, an insect-like race of aliens that are seeking to exterminate humanity in retaliation for mankind's colonization of their homeworld, Elysium IV. The game takes place on the escaping colony ship ISCS Armstrong, which is under attack by the Kerak. Players take the role of security officer Seth Walker who, along with his robot sidekick HR-V (pronounced "Harvey"), is tasked with repelling the Kerak attack on the ship. Assisting Seth are communications officer and love interest Gina Reynolds, Seth's best friend soldier Jake Henderson, cybernetics surgeon Dr. Edward DeSoto, and alcoholic mechanic Frank Murphy. Throughout the game, the player is given the option of replacing their body parts with cybernetic augmentations, which allow Seth to battle the Kerak more effectively, at the nebulous cost of "some of his humanity". Gina is fiercely opposed to cybernetic augmentation, Jake supports it fervently, and Dr. DeSoto is in favour of it to a certain extent, believing that man should not replace all their body parts.

Later in the game, it is revealed that the AI controlling the Armstrong, PILOT, is secretly planning to convert the ship's entire human population into mind-controlled cyborgs in order to ensure the survival of mankind from the threat of the Kerak. Seth, Harvey, and Gina set out to stop PILOT's plan, while Jake sides with PILOT and is converted into a massive cybernetic war-machine. Towards the end the player is asked via dialog box whether to join PILOT or to destroy it. After defeating Jake, Seth confronts PILOT. The closing scene has three different endings with the path followed determined by whether the player wishes to destroy PILOT and/or whether the player has undergone cybernetic augmentation throughout the game.

== Reception ==
Reception

Aggregate score
Aggregator	Score
Metacritic	60/100

Review scores
Publication	Score
1Up.com	C
Edge	4/10
Eurogamer	5/10
Game Informer	6/10
GamePro	2.25/5
GameSpot	5/10
GameSpy	2.5/5
Giant Bomb	3/5
IGN	6.4/10
PC Gamer (US)	58%

Space Siege received "mixed" reviews according to the review aggregation website Metacritic.
