= Supreme Commander 2 =

2010 video game

- Developers: Gas Powered Games; Virtual Programming (Mac)
- Publisher: Square Enix
- Designer: Chris Taylor
- Platforms: Windows, Xbox 360, Mac OS X
- Release: Windows: NA: March 2, 2010; PAL: March 5, 2010; Xbox 360: NA: March 16, 2010; PAL: March 19, 2010; Mac OS X: WW: September 24, 2010
- Genre: Real-time strategy
- Modes: Single-player, multiplayer

Supreme Commander 2 is a real-time strategy (RTS) Military science fiction video game developed by Gas Powered Games and published by Square Enix as the sequel to Supreme Commander. A Windows-only demo was initially released via Steam on February 24, 2010, with the full game released on March 2, 2010.

A Mac OS X version of Supreme Commander 2 was announced by Mac games publisher Virtual Programming in May 2010. They released the Mac OS X version of the game on September 24, 2010, and released the Infinite War Battle Pack for Mac OS X in January 2011.

The game received mixed reviews upon its release, getting 77 out of 100 based on 54 reviews on Metacritic.

== Gameplay ==
In both the skirmish and multiplayer modes, players start out with an Armored Command Unit (ACU), which is a large, powerful, construction-capable unit, as their avatar on the battlefield. They build mass extractors and power generators, which produce mass and energy, along with research facilities that produce research points faster. Players can also build land, air, and sea factories that produce land, air, and sea units, respectively. Players may also build add-on structures, expanding the capabilities of existing factories. Some buildings and units are more advanced than others and as players' bases and research levels expand, so does the quality of their units. Research points can be spent on faction-specific tech trees to add bonuses, abilities and upgrades, and to unlock more-advanced units and buildings. The final result of this development is the unlocking of experimental units, which are large, research-unlocked units and buildings with significantly more power than other units and buildings. Experimental units can be produced from experimental gantries (buildings with the sole purpose of building experimental units) or built by engineers. The ultimate aim of the game is to destroy the opponents' ACUs.

In the heavily-scripted campaign mode, the player is provided with a base at the start of the game, and faces an already-established opponent. In order to finish the level, the player has to complete certain objectives, for example "destroy the enemy's experimental unit." As the campaign progresses the player is able to unlock a wider range of units, the missions become more challenging, and the enemy grows stronger.

In an interview with MacGamer, an online magazine dedicated to gaming on Mac PCs, game designer Chris Taylor had this to say about Supreme Commander 2 and its spiritual link to his previous Total Annihilation series: "I think they are indeed the spiritual successors, because of the way I approach RTS Real-time strategy design. I don't like a lot of rules, and I like big, open worlds. Some might say the economy systems play a role in that, but I think it goes much deeper than that. I think many folks will see our upcoming Kings and Castles game as a continuing extension of those previous RTS titles."

The game is AMD Eyefinity validated.

== Plot ==
25 years after the expansion of the first game, the newly elected Coalition President is assassinated, causing the breakup of the coalition formed to defeat the Seraphim.

The first phase of the campaign (dedicated to the United Earth Federation, or UEF) follows Dominic Maddox, a UEF officer who is married to an Illuminate. After a botched training exercise, Maddox fights off rogue Cybran units at a communications array. After repelling the attack, his commanding officer, Colonel Rogers, takes sole command of all UEF forces on the planet. After defending a strategic weapons facility and encountering a mysterious Cybran named William Gauge in the Weddell Straits, Rogers orders Maddox to destroy the Illuminate colony of New Cathedral. Maddox, knowing that his Illuminate wife is inside New Cathedral, refuses and goes AWOL. Along the way, he is contacted by Dr. Zoe Snyder, whom provides him weapons and technology. After failing to stop UEF Commander Lynch from destroying New Cathedral with nuclear weapons before the population can be fully evacuated, Maddox decides to eliminate Colonel Rogers. Maddox defeats Rogers' forces and destroys his command center, but destroys the stealth system shielding a hidden teleportation gate in the process, unlocking the second phase of the campaign.

The second phase (dedicated to the Aeon Illuminate) follows Commander Thalia Kael as she fights for a group known as the Royal Guardians to "restore the Illuminate to their former glory." After ambushing a Cybran weapons convoy, securing technology from a decommissioned Aeon facility, and freeing a group of Aeon political prisoners, Thalia, along with technical assistance from her terminally ill brother Jaren, defends a geothermal power plant from UEF forces, where they meet Gauge, whom has show up for their assistance. The siblings learn of Maddox's defense of New Cathedral from Gauge and accompany him in his attack on a Coalition outpost, hoping to send a message to the Illuminate government. Only after Gauge levels the entire outpost's city with nuclear weapons does Thalia realize her mistake in unwittingly aiding Gauge's plans to find what he calls "Shiva Prime." On top of that, the Cybran convoy was actually on a humanitarian mission and the prisoners she freed were actually Royal Guardian commanders. Seeking to atone for her deeds, Thalia travels to Altair II intending to turn herself in to Coalition forces, but instead discovers a standoff between multiple commanders and Maddox, who has been holding position at the gate since his battle with Rogers. Maddox attempts to deescalate, but Gauge conducts multiple strategic launches to force the parties into combat. Maddox and Thalia join forces and defeat the other commanders, but Gauge arrives and slips past them into the gate. Acknowledging Jaren's observation that more Guardian forces are likely on their way, Maddox and Thalia divert their attention from Gauge and once again prepare their forces.

The third phase (dedicated to the Cybran Nation) begins on the planet Seraphim VII, and follows Ivan Brackman (an experimental clone of Dr. Brackman), an old roommate of Maddox, who fights under the direction of Dr. Brackman. Dr. Brackman informs Ivan that Shiva Prime is an ancient terraforming device built by a precursor race older than even the Seraphim. The pair secure Dr. Brackman's research from Gauge, whom has arrived via the gate and leave the planet before responding to a distress call from Dr. Snyder, whose facility is under attack by the Royal Guardians. After Snyder realizes her research has been stolen by the Guardians, Ivan travels to Altair II, where he encounters Thalia and Maddox holding off a Guardian assault. After beating back the attack, Ivan returns to Seraphim VII to confront Gauge. Gauge launches Shiva Prime into the atmosphere and sends a Guardian to the surface stop Ivan, but Ivan succeeds in defeating her in time and teleports to Shiva Prime.

Aboard the station, Gauge massacres the remaining Royal Guardians and uses the station's propulsion system to immediately travel to Altair II with the intent of destroying the planet. After a lengthy battle with Gauge and Shiva Prime's automated defenses, Ivan defeats Gauge, but then comes to the realization that as long as Shiva Prime exists, the factions will fight battle after battle for its control. He therefore decides not conform to his father's will, destroying Shiva Prime rather than allowing anyone else to possess it, a decision that greatly disappoints Dr. Brackman.

In the final cutscene, Ivan gives a voice-over speech at the Coalition Senate appealing for renewed ties between humanity's factions, while Maddox reunites with his family and an imprisoned Thalia visits the grave of Jaren, whom had succumbed to his illness. In the teaser, Dr. Brackman talks with Gauge - revealed to have survived his fight against Ivan and secretly working with Brackman - and begins a proto-brain initialization sequence, asking Gauge if he is ready for a new adventure.

== Demo ==
On February 24, 2010, a demo of Supreme Commander 2 was released on the Steam digital distribution service. The demo includes two tutorial levels and two campaign levels all played as the UEF faction, but does not include skirmish or multiplayer modes. The single player includes two missions, which were picked to show the more advanced portion of the game.

== Reception ==
Reception

Aggregate score
Aggregator	Score
Metacritic	PC: 77/100; X360: 75/100

Review scores
Publication	Score
Eurogamer	8/10
IGN	PC: 8.4/10; X360: 8.3/10
PC Gamer (UK)	87/100

On initial release, the game received mixed critical reception. While many critics praised the game as a standalone title, it was generally perceived to be a simplified version of the original game. Alec Meer, reviewing for Eurogamer, predicted that the game would "leave much of its intended fanbase cold," and Tom Francis, writing for PC Gamer UK, later summarized Supreme Commander 2 as "a game that solved the accessibility issues of the first game, bought primarily by people who didn't want them solved." On Metacritic, which aggregates a wide range of reviews and assigns an average score, the game received 77 out of 100 based on 54 reviews. The original Supreme Commander received 86 out of 100 on Metacritic.

After release, the game received several major updates and changes. For example, one update released in October 2010 reworked the way construction was paid for, as described above. The changes were widely praised and the game was considered by critics to have been improved since release. For example, Tom Francis, who gave the game a score of 85 out of 100 on release, said in October 2010 that had he been reviewing it in October 2010, he would have given it a 90. PC Gamer UK named Supreme Commander 2 their 2010 "Co-op Game Of The Year".

During the 14th Annual Interactive Achievement Awards, the Academy of Interactive Arts & Sciences nominated Supreme Commander 2 for "Strategy/Simulation Game of the Year".
