= Empire & State =

2011 video game

- Developer: Novel, Inc.
- Publisher: Novel, Inc.
- Platform: Microsoft Windows
- Release: November 28, 2011
- Genres: MOBA, MMORPG
- Mode: Massively multiplayer online game

Empire & State is a browser-based, free-to-play political strategy MMORPG developed by Novel. Empire & State was released as an open beta in April 2011 and was fully released in November 2011. In addition to being available through Empire & States website, the game became available to play through a game portal at Bigpoint Games in November 2011. The Lead Designers were Mike Marr and Toby Ragaini with Paul Furio as Technical Director and Keenan Purk as Lead Artist. The game involves the exploration and conquest of a new planet and is designed to appeal to both casual and hardcore gamers.

== Gameplay ==
Empire & State allows players to immigrate to other player-run empires to set up their home territory. Like citizens of an empire players can do jobs, collect resources, own property, build vehicles, and earn currency. Players can support the leader of an empire, start rebellions to overthrow governments or attempt to build their own empire by taking control of a city and fighting for the surrounding land.

For an empire to survive, players collaborate during rebellions or development of new empires. This creates a constantly evolving political environment where players form alliances or make enemies while facing honorable or corrupt governments.
