= Novel, Inc. =

American video game developer

- Type: Private
- Industry: Simulation and video games
- Founded: Redmond (2009)
- Headquarters: Kirkland, United States
- Key people: Brayden Olson (CEO) Mike Marr (Director of Product Development); Gordon Ludlow (Technical Director); Elizabeth Walkey (Senior Producer) Keenan Purk (Art Director)
- Products: Empire & State
- Number of employees: 20+

Novel, Inc. is a video game studio and enterprise simulation developer, based in Kirkland, Washington, United States. Novel is known for being both a traditional video game developer and bridging the gaming and business world with enterprise simulations.

The latter work, being deemed by press as "The Matrix for businesses," was ranked by The Huffington Post as one of the Top 30 Most Underrated Innovations of 2010 at #18 between Gmail #19 and the iPad #17.

Novel is led by a leadership team made up of video game industry veterans from EA, Microsoft, Bungie, Turbine, Big Fish and Playdom. Novel was founded by the young American entrepreneur Brayden Olson who continues to be the company’s chief executive.

The company's first major videogame release, Empire & State was released November, 2011. Empire & State is a massively multi-player game offering a completely dynamic world controlled by players. In one interview with Lead Designer Mike Marr, it is described as "Civilization 5 with hundreds of players fighting Risk-style on a hex map, but with the focus on politics and economy".

Novel has an announced partnership with the University of Washington’s Center for Leadership & Strategic Thinking, which is part of the University of Washington Michael G. Foster School of Business. The stated goal for the partnership is to, "become the undisputed heavy weight champions and thought leaders in the new enterprise simulations space." It was also announced that this simulation was being built for a yet unnamed Fortune 1000 company in the Pacific Northwest.

The specific details of Novel’s first enterprise simulation have not yet been announced. However, based on what has been released, Novel’s work was named by The Huffington Post as one of the Top 30 Most Underrated Innovations of 2010, and hailed by the reporter as, "by far one of the most exciting things (though sadly still in concept stage) that I’ve ever heard of."
