= Dungeon Siege =

2002 action role-playing game

- Developer: Gas Powered Games
- Publishers: Microsoft (Windows); Destineer (Mac OS X)
- Producer: Jacob McMahon
- Designer: Chris Taylor
- Writer: Neal Hallford
- Composer: Jeremy Soule
- Platforms: Microsoft Windows; Mac OS X
- Release: April 5, 2002 (Windows); May 2, 2003 (Mac OS X)
- Genre: Action role-playing
- Modes: Single-player, multiplayer

Dungeon Siege is an action role-playing game developed by Gas Powered Games and published by Microsoft in April 2002 for Microsoft Windows and the following year by Destineer for Mac OS X. Set in the pseudo-medieval kingdom of Ehb, the high fantasy game follows a young farmer and her companions as they journey to defeat an invading force. Initially only seeking to warn the nearby town of the invasion of a race of creatures named the Krug, the farmer and the companions that join her along the way are soon swept up in finding a way to defeat another race called the Seck, resurgent after being trapped for 300 years. Unlike other role-playing video games of the time, the world of Dungeon Siege does not have levels but is a single, continuous area without loading screens that the player journeys through, fighting hordes of enemies. Also, rather than setting character classes and manually controlling all of the characters in the group, the player controls their overall tactics and weapons and magic usage, which direct their character growth.

Dungeon Siege was the first title by Gas Powered Games, which was founded in May 1998 by Chris Taylor, then known for the 1997 real-time strategy game Total Annihilation. Joined by several of his coworkers from Cavedog Entertainment, Taylor wanted to create a different type of game, and after trying several concepts they decided to make an action role-playing game as their first title. Taylor also served as one of the designers for the game, joined by Jacob McMahon as the other lead designer and producer and Neal Hallford as the lead story and dialogue writer. The music was composed by Jeremy Soule, who had also worked on Total Annihilation. Gas Powered Games concentrated on making a role-playing game that was stripped of the typical genre elements they found slow or frustrating, to keep the player focused on the action. Development took over four years, though it was initially planned to take only two; completing the game within even four years required the team to work 12- to 14-hour days and weekends for most of the time.

The game was highly rated by critics upon release; it is listed by review aggregator Metacritic as the third-highest rated computer role-playing game of 2002. Critics praised the graphics and seamless world, as well as the fun and accessible gameplay, but were dismissive of the plot. Dungeon Siege sold over 1.7 million copies, and was nominated for the Computer Role-Playing Game of the Year award by the Academy of Interactive Arts & Sciences. Gas Powered Games emphasized creating and releasing tools for players to use in making mods for the game during development, which resulted in an active modding community after release. An expansion pack, Dungeon Siege: Legends of Aranna, was released in 2003, and a further series of games was developed in the franchise, consisting of Dungeon Siege II (2005) and its own expansion Dungeon Siege II: Broken World (2006), a spinoff PlayStation Portable game titled Dungeon Siege: Throne of Agony (2006), and a third main title, Dungeon Siege III (2011). A trilogy of movies, with the first loosely inspired by the plot of Dungeon Siege, were released as In the Name of the King: A Dungeon Siege Tale (2007, theaters), In the Name of the King 2: Two Worlds (2011, home video), and In the Name of the King 3: The Last Mission (2014, home video).

== Gameplay ==
An eight-person party fights robots in the Goblin mines. The character statuses are in the upper left, while the tactical controls are in the lower right.

Dungeon Siege is an action role-playing game set in a pseudo-medieval high fantasy world, presented in 3D with a third-person virtual camera system under the control of the player, in which the player characters navigate the terrain and fight off hostile creatures. The player chooses the gender and customizes the appearance of the main character of the story prior to the start of the game and typically controls them. The main character is joined by up to seven other characters, which are controlled via artificial intelligence; the player may switch which character they are controlling at any time. The other characters move in relation to the controlled character according to the formation and level of aggression towards enemies chosen by the player. The additional characters can be removed from the group and re-recruited at any given time.

The game world is not broken up into levels, but is instead one large area not separated by loading screens. As the player journeys through the largely linear world, they encounter numerous monsters and enemies of varying types that attack whenever the party of player characters approach. The party defends themselves and attacks enemies using melee and ranged weapons, and nature and combat magic. The player does not select a character class for the characters, unlike other role-playing video games; instead, using weapons or magic of a particular type increases the character's skill with them over time. Whenever a player gains enough experience points from killing enemies and reaches a new level in that weapon type, they gain some number of points in their strength, dexterity, or intelligence statistics, which in turn relate to the number of health points and mana that they have, and damage that they do with weapons.

Characters can equip weapons, armor, rings, and amulets, which provide attack or defense points, or give bonuses to some other statistic. There are also usable items such as potions to restore a character's health or mana. Weapons, armor, and other items are found by killing enemies, breaking containers, or by purchase from vendors. Each character has an inventory, represented as a fixed grid, with each item depicted by a shape taking up spaces on the grid. One character type, the mule, cannot use weapons or magic, but has a much larger inventory.

Dungeon Siege has both a single-player and multiplayer mode. The single-player mode consists of a single story and world; players can either create a new character when starting the story or use one created in a prior playthrough. The cooperative multiplayer mode allows for up to eight players to play through either the single-player storyline or in the multiplayer map, which features a central town hub with increasingly difficult enemies as players move away from it. Multiplayer games can be set to different difficulty levels, allowing accommodation of higher-leveled characters. Additional maps can be created by players that can allow for competitive multiplayer instead. Multiplayer matches can be created and joined via local area networks, direct IP addresses, and, prior to its closure in 2006, through the Microsoft Zone matchmaking service.

== Plot ==
Dungeon Siege is set in the Kingdom of Ehb, a varied region on the continent of Aranna containing deserts, swamps, forests, and mountains, created three centuries earlier at the dissolution of the Empire of Stars. At the beginning of the game, the player character's farming village is attacked by a race of creatures named the Krug. The main character, a farmer with no given background who is named by the player, journeys through the Krug forces to the town of Stonebridge. Upon breaking the siege of the town, and gaining their first companion, the player character is tasked by the town's garrison leader Gyorn with journeying to the town of Glacern and alerting the Ehb military forces, called the 10th Legion, of the incursion and defeating any forces they encounter along the way. After journeying through crypts, mines, and mountains, the player character reaches Glacern, where they are informed that the Krug invasion happened the same day that the Grand Mage Merik disappeared, and are charged with traveling over the mountains to Fortress Kroth to assist the legion there. In the mountains they find Merik, who informs them that the Krug invasion is part of a larger invasion by the Seck, who destroyed the Empire of Stars before being imprisoned underneath Castle Ehb, and who have escaped and taken the castle. Merik asks the player to help recover the Staff of Stars from the Goblins. Prior to its theft, the Staff had kept the Seck imprisoned in the Vault of Eternity.

The player fights through monsters and bandits in crystal caves, a forest, a swamp, and an underground Goblin fortress filled with mechanical war machines. After recovering the Staff from the Goblins, the player character meets a division of the 10th Legion and is pointed towards Fortress Kroth, which has been overrun with undead. After clearing the fortress and fighting monsters and a dragon in the Cliffs of Fire, they march on Castle Ehb. The player characters then storm the castle and fight through the Seck forces to rescue King Konreid. He informs the party that the Seck's leader, Gom, is seeking the magical weapons from the Empire of Stars stored in the Chamber of Stars, and that the characters must secure the weapons and then defeat the remaining Seck. The player character collects the weapons and fights through lava caves and the Vault of Eternity where the Seck had been imprisoned. The player character kills Gom, defeating the Seck and saving the kingdom.

== Development ==
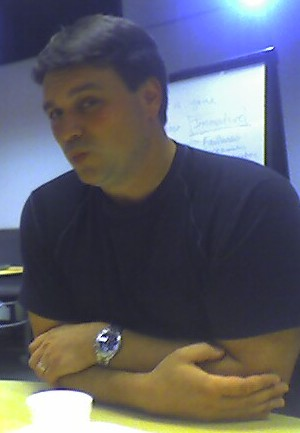
Designer and Gas Powered Games founder Chris Taylor in 2006

Gas Powered Games was founded in May 1998 by Chris Taylor, then known for the 1997 real-time strategy game Total Annihilation. Joined by several of his coworkers from Cavedog Entertainment, Taylor wanted to create a different type of game than before, and after trying several concepts the team decided to make an action role-playing game as their first title. As well as helping create the initial concept, Taylor served as one of the designers for the game, joined by Jacob McMahon as the game's other lead designer and producer and Neal Hallford as the game's lead story and dialogue writer. Hallford was brought onto the project after it had already started; Taylor had devised the start and end of the game but left the intervening details and background story to him. The game's music was composed by Jeremy Soule, who had also worked on Total Annihilation. The development team included around thirty people during development, with changes over time, and reached forty at the project's conclusion. The development of the game took over four years, though it was initially planned to take only two.

Dungeon Siege was inspired by prior role-playing games such as Baldur's Gate and the Ultima series, but primarily by Diablo, which Taylor admired for having an experience that "concentrated on action" that players could jump into without first researching the gameplay details and settings. Taylor wanted to expand that concept into a streamlined, immersive, and action-heavy role-playing game that removed common elements of the genre that he found boring, frustrating, or slow. Taylor also wanted to make the gameplay itself simpler than contemporary role-playing games, so as to appeal to a wider audience. To that end, he asked Hallford to craft a narrative that was also fast and streamlined; he had him write a detailed backstory for the game, which would not be presented to players but would inform and inspire the developers, leaving the in-game text restrained to keep players engaged with the action. Hallford described the process of writing for the game as similar to other game projects, besides a greater emphasis on brevity, though he has said that he was brought onto the project much later than he usually is, which meant that he had to create a story that worked as a background to the set pieces that had already been developed. The plot of the game was intended by Taylor to be subordinate to the gameplay; to that end, he was unconcerned that his overall story arc was considered, even by the development team, to be somewhat of a cliché, as he felt that journeying to defeat an "ultimate evil" was very motivating to players. Taylor and Hallford discussed producing a Dungeon Siege novel to explore Hallford's story, though it never came to fruition.

Taylor wanted to further improve on the Diablo role-playing game formula by removing the concept of picking a character class at all and omitting Diablo's long loading times. The development team also tried to make the game more streamlined by removing the need to backtrack to previously visited towns to sell items, by adding inventories to companion characters and pack mules. At one point in development, they planned to have a "helper" character who would pick up items dropped by enemies to let the player avoid doing so themselves. The developers also changed some elements that were standard in role-playing games that Taylor and the other developers found frustrating, such as letting players resell items to vendors for the same price that they were bought for instead of a steep discount, and "sipping" or only partially using potions instead of always using up the whole item.

Gas Powered Games included their game development tool, called the Siege Editor, as a tool for players to mod the game. Having seen the output of players creating mods for Total Annihilation, Taylor wanted to "take that to the extreme" and provide a full set of tools to foster a community of players enhancing and changing the game after release. He felt that the tools, which could allow players to make new game worlds, characters, and gameplay, would help support a large, long-term community of players around the game. Gas Powered Games hoped that providing what Daily Radar called "one of the most comprehensive level toolsets we've ever seen" would allow players to quickly and easily create small game regions, as well as allow more serious modders the ability to develop entire parallel games using the Dungeon Siege game engine. They also hoped that this modding community would be able to enhance and extend the multiplayer gameplay beyond what they could release. Taylor attributed his enthusiasm for releasing their own development tools for modding to both his enjoyment of seeing mods for Total Annihilation produced years after its release as well as the lack of negative consequences to John Carmack and id Software's historical tendency to release the entire source code to their games. Taylor later estimated that the company spent around twenty percent of their budget on developing the modding tools.

After the first year of development, Gas Powered Games found that they were not going to be able to finish the game within the planned two years; not only was the seamless world without loading screens harder to create than they had thought, but, according to lead developer Bartosz Kijanka, they had been overambitious in choosing how many innovative features they could put into the game's custom engine, such as the wide range through which the virtual camera system could zoom in and out. Other features supported and later dropped included allowing up to ten characters at once—and therefore maintaining up to ten areas of the single-player world—instead of the final maximum of eight, and a weather system that included wind blowing projectiles off course. According to Kijanka, the developers also spent a lot of time changing technologies mid-development, such as building a custom animation editor before moving to a licensed one, and starting with the OpenGL graphics library only to switch to Direct3D. As a result, the team was required to work 12- to 14-hour days and weekends for most of the development time in order to complete the game within four years. In a 2011 interview, Taylor stated that in retrospect the final cost in development time of the seamless world may have been too high, and also that the team tried to make too large of a game for their budget; he believed that a game with closer to 35 hours of playtime instead of 70 would have been a better and more polished experience given their constraints.

By 2000, Gas Powered Games had begun to search for a publisher for the game. Taylor claims that multiple publishers were interested in the game, but he was convinced by Ed Fries to partner with the newly established Microsoft PC publishing group. Although Microsoft's publishing wing was established in part to publish games for the newly announced Xbox console, Gas Powered Games and Microsoft did not strongly consider bringing the game to the console. Taylor believes that this was due to the size of the game itself, as well as the small market for role-playing games on consoles at the time. Dungeon Siege was initially planned for release in the third quarter of 2001, before being delayed to the following year, and Gas Powered Games spent the added time tuning and polishing the game and expanding the game's items and multiplayer features. Dungeon Siege was released for Windows on April 5, 2002, by Microsoft. A version for Mac OS X on May 2, 2003, by developer Westlake Interactive and publisher Destineer.

== Reception ==
Reception

Aggregate score
| Aggregator | Score |
|---|---|
| Metacritic | 86/100 (29 reviews) |

Review scores
| Publication | Score |
|---|---|
| Computer Gaming World | 4.5/5 |
| Game Informer | 9.25/10 |
| GamePro | 5/5 |
| GameSpot | 8.4/10 |
| GameSpy | 89/100 |
| IGN | 8.5/10 |
| PC Gamer (US) | 91/100 |

Dungeon Siege was commercially successful, selling over 1.7 million copies. According to the NPD Group, preorders of the game in the month before its release made it the eighth-best selling computer game of March 2002, and upon release in the following month it rose to second-best selling, after The Sims: Vacation. It fell to seventh and then thirteenth place the following two months, and finished in 14th place for the year overall. By August 2006, it had sold 360,000 copies and earned $14.5 million in the United States alone. This led Edge to declare it the country's 44th-best selling computer game between January 2000 and August 2006. By September 2002, Dungeon Siege had also received a "Gold" certification from the Verband der Unterhaltungssoftware Deutschland (VUD), indicating sales of at least 100,000 units across Germany, Austria and Switzerland.

The game was highly rated by critics upon release; it is listed by review aggregator Metacritic as the third-highest rated computer role-playing game of 2002, behind Neverwinter Nights and The Elder Scrolls III: Morrowind, and the twenty-first-highest computer game overall for the year. The graphics were highly praised; Dan Adams of IGN called it "ridiculously pretty to watch", while reviewers for GameSpot and GamePro praised the environments as being detailed and varied. Robert Coffey of Computer Gaming World and Greg Vederman of PC Gamer similarly lauded the detailed environments, while Andy McNamara and Kristian Brogger of Game Informer and GameSpy's Peter Suciu called out the seamless world without loading screens as especially worthy of note. Suciu further praised how the freeform, seamless map was used to create areas that were not shaped like rectangular regions with a winding path filling up the space, as was typical with other role-playing games of the time. The IGN and GamePro reviewers commended the sound effects as excellent and for helping to create the atmosphere of the game, while the IGN and GameSpot reviewers also praised the "ambient orchestral score".

The gameplay was similarly lauded; the GamePro review claimed that "Dungeon Siege's gameplay is perhaps its biggest and most transparent improvement over previous titles in the genre." Several reviewers compared it favorably to Diablo II (2000), then one of the most popular computer action role-playing games, with Adams of IGN claiming that it was very similar to Diablo II with some changes and improvements, and Coffey of Computer Gaming World stating that the only thing keeping it from being directly rated as better was that the shift to a more tactical gameplay made it too different of a game to directly compare. PC Gamer's Vederman, Computer Gaming World's Coffey, and the GameSpot reviewer praised the gameplay as being streamlined and accessible; they liked the tactical nature of controlling a party of adventurers who improved according to how they were used rather than directly controlling their actions and statistics. IGN's Adams, however, said that the gameplay could get monotonous, Vederman of PC Gamer felt that the gameplay combat choices were somewhat limited, and GameSpy's Suciu disliked the linearity of the single-player game. Adams further added that many of the tactical choices in the game were inconsequential, as all battles quickly devolved into brawls, and that the freeform system of leveling was essentially the same as four character classes as pursuing multiple tracks was ineffective.

The multiplayer content received mixed reviews: Adams praised the amount of additional content, while Suciu and the GameSpot reviewer noted that the multiplayer gameplay could easily become unbalanced between different players. The single-player plot was generally dismissed as inconsequential: the GamePro reviewer termed it "skeletal" and the Game Informer reviewers "lackluster", and the GameSpot reviewer called it "bland and forgettable" and concluded that players who wanted a "deeper role-playing game" would be disappointed. Overall, Vederman of PC Gamer called Dungeon Siege "one of the best, most enjoyable games of the year" and GamePro's reviewer claimed it "walks all over its competition with almost effortless grace", while Adams of IGN concluded that it was entertaining but had "untapped potential".

== Legacy ==
After it was showcased at E3 2000, Dungeon Siege proceeded to win the Best RPG award from Game Revolution and Most Immersive Role-playing Game award from GameSpot. After release, the Academy of Interactive Arts & Sciences (AIAS) nominated Dungeon Siege for "Computer Role-Playing Game of the Year" and "Outstanding Innovation in Computer Gaming" at the 6th Annual Interactive Achievement Awards; it did not win either category, losing to Neverwinter Nights and Battlefield 1942, respectively. The game was also a nominee for PC Gamer US's "2002 Best Roleplaying Game" award, but lost again to Neverwinter Nights. It did win the Best PC Game Graphics award from IGN.

Gas Powered Games' release of the Siege Editor did spark the rise of a modding community around the game; even before release several modding groups announced intentions to use the engine to create large-scale mods remaking games from the Ultima series of role playing games. After the game's release, numerous mods were created, including several "total conversion" mods that made wholly new games and stories such as "The Lands of Hyperborea" and "Elemental". Gas Powered Games released one mod of their own in July 2002 titled "Yesterhaven", created by six designers over six weeks, which provided a short multiplayer storyline for low-level characters wherein they defended a town from three thematic plagues of monsters. It was followed up by Legends of Aranna, a full expansion pack developed by Mad Doc Software and released on November 11, 2003 for Windows and Mac OS X by Microsoft. The expansion pack added little new gameplay besides new terrains, creatures, and items, but featured an entirely separate story from the original game. In Legends, the player controls another unnamed farmer; after the Staff of Stars is stolen by a creature called the Shadowjumper, they set off to retrieve it. After fighting their way through monsters in icy hills, jungles, and islands, the player arrives at the mystical Great Clock, a giant artifact which controls Aranna's seasons. There they defeat the Shadowjumper and retrieve the Staff of Stars. It received generally less positive reviews than the original, with critics praising the amount of content but criticizing the lack of changes to the base gameplay. At the 7th Annual Interactive Achievement Awards, the AIAS nominated Legends of Aranna for "Computer Role-Playing Game of the Year", though it lost to Star Wars: Knights of the Old Republic.

Several other games have been released in the Dungeon Siege series, beginning with Dungeon Siege II (2005). That game received its own expansion pack, Dungeon Siege II: Broken World (2006), and was followed by a spinoff PlayStation Portable game titled Dungeon Siege: Throne of Agony (2006) and a third main title, Dungeon Siege III (2011). A movie directed by Uwe Boll and inspired by the original game, In the Name of the King: A Dungeon Siege Tale, was released in theaters in 2007; it has been described as being "loosely based" on the game, and was a commercial and critical failure. It was followed by the home video sequels In the Name of the King 2: Two Worlds (2011) and In the Name of the King 3: The Last Mission (2014).
