= HardBall II =

1989 video game

- Developer: Distinctive Software
- Publisher: Accolade
- Designers: Don Mattrick; Rick Friesen; Chris Taylor
- Programmers: Chris Taylor; Rick Friesen
- Artist: Tony Lee
- Composers: Krisjan Hatlelid; Bernie Vachon
- Platforms: MS-DOS, Amiga, Classic Mac OS
- Release: 1989: IBM PC; 1990: Amiga, Mac
- Genre: Sports
- Mode: Single-player

HardBall II is a baseball video game developed by Distinctive Software and published for MS-DOS in 1989 by Accolade. Classic Mac OS and Amiga versions were released in 1990. It is the sequel to HardBall!, which was released in 1985.

== Gameplay ==
HardBall II maintains the game play mechanics from HardBall! and adds the following features:

1. Updates and stores stats in "virtually every conceivable category."
2. Stats change from at-bat to at-bat, from game to game.
3. Pickoffs
4. League play
5. Team editor
6. More frames of animation per player.
7. Shift the infield and outfield according to each hitter.
8. Addition of seven different stadiums and five different views.
9. TV Instant Replay feature.
10. Pull-down menus make managing the game easier.

== Release ==
The Hardball II package includes:

1. Two floppy disks
2. 60 page manual
3. Batting commands sheet
4. Fielding commands chart
5. Copy protection code wheel

The code wheel contains three wheels. The outer wheel contains the last name of baseball players. The middle ring contains the players' first names. The inner ring contains years. When the rings are properly aligned, cut outs in the third ring reveal the players' baseball stats. These stats must be entered into the program before the game will load.

== Reception ==
HardBall II sold about 100,000 copies.

A review in the Chicago Tribune commented, "Though nowhere near as statistically accurate as Earl Weaver Baseball, Hardball II offers a much better arcade version of the National Pastime than does the competition. So if pitching the ball and swinging the bat are more exciting to you than lineup changes or clever managerial moves, this fun game should be a big hit."

In the June 1990 edition of Games International, Brian Walker admired the available customization options, saying that it added a "subtlety" to the game. He called the graphics "excellent", and thought that this would help popularize the game of baseball in the United Kingdom. He concluded by giving the game above-average ratings of 9 out of 10 for game play and 8 out of 10 for graphics, saying, "Quality products like Hardball II can only spread the word."

HardBall II won in the Best Sports Program category in the 1990 CODiE Awards.
