= Dungeon Siege: Throne of Agony =

2006 video game

- PAL region box art
- Developer: SuperVillain Studios
- Publishers: NA: 2K; PAL: Take-Two Interactive
- Designer: Chris Taylor
- Engine: Custom-DS2
- Platform: PlayStation Portable
- Release: NA: October 30, 2006; PAL: February 2, 2007
- Genre: Role-playing
- Modes: Single-player, multiplayer

Dungeon Siege: Throne of Agony is a role-playing video game for PlayStation Portable developed by SuperVillain Studios and published by 2K in the U.S. in 2006, and by Take-Two Interactive in the PAL region in 2007.

== Gameplay ==
Instead of using the mouse like in the original Dungeon Siege games, the player directly controls the character with the analog stick. There are three characters to choose from, customizable as they level up. Players can also choose a partner, making a party of a maximum of two characters, but the partner can be changed (ranged, magic, melee). A friend can join in ad-hoc wireless play between two PlayStation Portable consoles, forming a party of up to four characters (two characters and two followers). Enemies are much more scattered throughout the map rather than having several enemies in one screen at the same time like in Dungeon Siege II. Players can unlock exclusive items using codes provided in Dungeon Siege II: Broken World.

== Plot ==
Dungeon Siege: Throne of Agony picks up where Dungeon Siege II left off: after the second cataclysm altered the world of Aranna. A new threat appears out of nowhere, and the player has to choose one of three characters to oppose it. Wild monsters attack elves and humans, with the one behind this menace being known as the Black Druid. The player has to face many different creatures before the Black Druid is located and killed. It turns out that the true enemy are Vagar, a race of corrupted beings of whom the Black Druid was a member. They serve their mistress, Malith, once a leader of Agallan giants, now a fallen creature who takes its powers from the Throne of Agony. The hero has to defeat Vagar, find the Agallan giants, and ultimately defeat Malith. Finally, the player has to decide what to do with the Throne of Agony, a sentient throne of darkness, as it can either be used or destroyed.

== Development ==
A console based Dungeon Siege game was planned by Gas Powered Games since 2003. The project named Dungeon Siege X was originally planned for Xbox and expected release simultaneously with Dungeon Siege II. The project slowed down and was eventually canceled. In 2006, Gas Powered ended the publishing rights with Microsoft Game Studios and signed with 2K Games. The project was resurrected by 2K and finally announced for PSP alongside Dungeon Siege II: Broken World expansion for PC. It was developed by SuperVillain Studios.

== Reception ==
Reception

Aggregate score
Aggregator	Score
Metacritic	74/100

Review scores
Publication	Score
1Up.com	B+
Eurogamer	7/10
Game Informer	8/10
GameSpot	6.8/10
GameSpy	3.5/5
GameZone	8.5/10
IGN	8.3/10
Pocket Gamer	3.5/5
PlayStation: The Official Magazine	8/10
RPGFan	76%
X-Play	3/5

The game received "mixed or average reviews" according to the review aggregation website Metacritic.
