= In the Name of the King 2: Two Worlds =

- Official DVD cover
- Directed by: Uwe Boll
- Written by: Michael C. Nachoff
- Based on: Dungeon Siege series by Gas Powered Games
- Produced by: Dan Clarke; Chawn Williamson
- Starring: Dolph Lundgren; Natassia Malthe; Lochlyn Munro
- Cinematography: Matthias Neumann
- Edited by: Peter Forslund
- Music by: Jessica de Rooij
- Production companies: Boll Kino; Brighlight Pictures; Studio West Productions
- Distributed by: 20th Century Fox Home Entertainment
- Release dates: December 27, 2011 (United States and Canada)
- Running time: 96 minutes
- Countries: United States; Canada
- Language: English
- Budget: $4.5 million

In the Name of the King 2: Two Worlds (also known as In the Name of the King 2 and In the Name of the King: Two Worlds) is a 2011 fantasy adventure film directed by Uwe Boll. The film stars Dolph Lundgren, Natassia Malthe and Lochlyn Munro. It is the second installment in the In the Name of the King film series and it is the sequel to the 2007's In the Name of the King starring Jason Statham. The film was released on DVD and Blu-ray in the United States and Canada on December 27, 2011. The German Blu-Ray release included a 3D version.

== Plot ==
Granger, a former Special Forces soldier living in modern-day Vancouver, is sent on a quest to fulfill an ancient prophecy. He is forcibly pulled into a time portal in his home after fighting off a small group of hooded assassins who try to kill him. He finds himself several hundred years in the past during the middle ages, in the forested war-torn Kingdom of Ehb. Granger teams up with an unlikely band of allies, accompanied by a female doctor named Manhattan. His goal is to slay the leader of the "Dark Ones", a witch known only as the Holy Mother. Fighting against all odds, Granger must free the land from the grasp of the evil tyrant Raven, save the kingdom, and find a way to get back to his own time.

== Cast ==
- Dolph Lundgren as Granger
- Lochlyn Munro as The King / Raven
- Natassia Malthe as Manhattan
- Christina Jastrzembska as Holy Mother
- Aleks Paunovic as Allard
- Natalia Guslistaya as Elianna
- Elisabeth Rosen as Seer
- Michael Adamthwaite as Thane
- Michaela Mann as Young Woman
- Noah Beggs as Pudgy Dark One
- Heather Doerksen as Dunyana

== Sequel ==
A third film, In the Name of the King 3: The Last Mission, was released in 2014. The film stars Dominic Purcell; Boll returned to direct.
