= Demigod (video game) =

2009 video game

- Developer: Gas Powered Games
- Publisher: Stardock: EU/AS: Atari
- Designers: Mike Marr; Chris Taylor
- Programmer: Patrick Meade
- Artists: Nate Simpson; Steve Thompson
- Writers: Nate Simpson; Steve Baumann; Dru Staltman
- Composer: Howard Mostrom
- Platform: Microsoft Windows
- Release: NA: April 14, 2009; EU: May 29, 2009
- Genre: Multiplayer online battle arena
- Modes: Single-player, multiplayer

Demigod is a multiplayer online battle arena video game developed by Gas Powered Games for Microsoft Windows platform and released on April 14, 2009. The game's title refers to the powerful player characters that battle for supremacy over various zones. The game is multiplayer-oriented and competitive in nature, though it also features a single-player mode against CPU commanded characters. A free demo featuring a multi-player option became available on July 30, 2009 with all gameplay modes unlocked.

== Gameplay ==
There are two distinct types of Demigod: Assassins and Generals. Assassins rely on their varied combat abilities in a direct fight to kill other Demigods. Generals are a hybrid Demigod that create and support their own minions and other Demigods. Demigod launched with eight Demigods available, four for each type of Demigod, and added two additional Demigods after release.

== Development ==
On December 3, 2008, Atari Europe picked up the rights to co-publish and distribute the retail release of the game in Europe and Asia. On April 9, 2009, GameStop began selling Demigod before its release date of 14 April. The game's servers were not yet launched thus not allowing preorder customers to have online play as originally intended. The issue was compounded by a cracked version of the game available for illegal download on torrent sites. In response, Stardock activated all pre-orders a day early from the planned release after returning to work on Monday April 13, 2009. The game also had technical problems during online play. Players experienced connectivity issues until June when a patch was released.

== Reception ==
Demigod

Aggregate score
Aggregator	Score
Metacritic	76/100

Review scores
Publication	Score
1Up.com	C
GameSpot	6.5/10
GameTrailers	8.5/10
GameZone	8.7/10
IGN	7.5/10
PC Gamer (UK)	8.1/10

The game received "generally favorable" reviews, according to video game review aggregator Metacritic. Review website 1UP.com summarized much of the negative and angered criticism the game received with the following quote: "If you're interested in throwing down cash for a beta and maybe getting in some practice before things get smoothed out, go ahead and bump that score up a letter grade. Anybody else should find something else to do until then."

GameSpot reviewed the game with a rating of 6.5/10, noting major online connectivity problems and the lack of tutorial or story based campaign as major problems. IGN's Jason Ocampo gave the game a 7.5/10 citing bad multiplayer netcoding and stating "you'd best wait a while for the developers to get things working before you dive into Demigod".
