= Dungeon Siege II: Broken World =

- Developer: Gas Powered Games
- Publisher: 2K
- Designer: Chris Taylor
- Series: Dungeon Siege
- Platform: Microsoft Windows
- Release: NA: August 4, 2006; EU: September 1, 2006
- Genre: Action role-playing
- Modes: Single-player, multiplayer

Dungeon Siege II: Broken World is the expansion pack for the role-playing video game Dungeon Siege II and continues the unfinished plot of the previous game. It was developed by Gas Powered Games and published by 2K in 2006.

== Gameplay ==
The expansion pack introduced several new features, including two hybrid classes based on existing classes, Dwarf as a playable race, and recipes crafting system, PlayStation Portable crossover items to promote and to be used in conjunction with Dungeon Siege: Throne of Agony.

== Plot ==
The game continues where Dungeon Siege II left off. As with the main game, Broken World takes place on the continent of Aranna. However the world has changed much following the fall of Valdis and the clash of the Sword of Zaramoth and the Shield of Azunai. The protagonist continues to pursue the Dark Wizard who advised Valdis and masterminded much of what happened during Dungeon Siege II.

=== Part 1 ===
The game starts in a Dryad Outpost south of Aman'lu where numerous rogue mages corrupted by the Dark Wizard have appeared and are attacking the local population. Additionally, strange beings known as "bound creatures" started to appear in great numbers in the nearby forests. The hostile bound creatures are identifiable as mutilated creatures native to the forest. The player is asked by a refugee to find and save his brother Kanred, a rogue mage. The player is able to locate Kanred but is forced to kill him. A group of dryad patrol appears at the scene and collects Kanred's magical residue. The dryad patrols are not very happy with player's interference with their affairs. Nonetheless, player continues to pursue the Dark Wizard.

Using Kanred's staff, the player is able to track down the Dark Wizard in the Kelvaran Waste. The Dark Wizard explains to the player that he is the Overmage of the Cinbri and is in an effort to return his people to Aranna. The Overmage promptly escapes. From the conversation, the player learns that Overmage has already brought destruction to Aman'lu, protagonist's hometown. The player then seeks passage to Aman'lu.

Warden Celia, the commander of the Dryad Outpost, has sealed off the passage to Aman'lu for safety reasons and she is away on duty. While trying to reach her, player is forced to kill a rogue mage who turned out to be Celeb'hel the Elder of Aman'lu. After defeating Celeb'hel, Warden Celia appears with number of dryads and starts to collect Celeb'hel's magic residue. Celia refuses to reveal dryad's motive for collecting the magical residues and speaks about a secretive yet auspicious goal. With all the unwelcome vigilantism, Celia is more than happy to send the player away.

=== Part 2 ===
Arriving at Aman'lu, player realized that it is only a shadow of its former self. The surviving residents are forced to wall themselves in against the onslaught of bound creatures. It is made clear in Aman'lu that bound creatures are the products of Familiar Surgeons. The Familiars are a race that the elves have previously fought, and nearly lost, had it not been for a group of brave warriors, named "Crimson Hunters".

After venturing deep into the Vai'lutra forests near Aman'lu, the player's company is able to defeat two Familiar Surgeons. While inside one of their strongholds, the protagonist learns that the Overmage is behind the Familiars and that the dryads are helping Familiars collecting magical energy.

After returning to Aman'lu, the player is sent to confront dryad's Great Leader in Solanum. The Great Leader has prepared a portal for the dryads. Just as the player arrives, the attending dryads entered the portal. While alone with the player's group, the Great Leader reveals himself to be Overmage incognito. Overmage was able to escape again by summoning a minion, and changing the destination of the portal. After defeating the minion, player enters the portal and is transported to Glorydeep Enclave.

=== Part 3 ===
The dwarf inhabitants of Glorydeep Enclave are surprised by the visit of an outsider. The Overmage have enslaved them for over a hundred years to restore the buried Cinbri City. They are more than willing to help the protagonist, for they know they will be sent to the Familiar Surgeons once they are no longer needed. After freeing the dwarves from their overseers, the dwarves in turn help player enter Cinbri City.

Deep inside Cinbri City, player meets the Overmage and the group of dryads. The Overmage explained to the player that he is going to transform into Zaramoth reborn in order to achieve his goal. After player weakens the Overmage, the Overmage promptly transforms into Zaramoth reborn. While Zaramoth is powerful, it is not something the protagonist cannot handle. After defeating Overmage in his Zaramoth form, the only surviving dryad at the scene Kirani got up and recapped what has transpired. The story ends with a cinematic ending explaining the fate of all the companions.

== Reception ==
Reception

Aggregate score
Aggregator	Score
Metacritic	62/100

Review scores
Publication	Score
1Up.com	C+
Computer Games Magazine	3/5
Computer Gaming World	(average)
Game Informer	7.5/10
GameRevolution	D+
GameSpot	6.3/10
GameSpy	3/5
GameZone	6.8/10
IGN	6.3/10
PC Gamer (US)	59%

Broken World received "mixed" reviews according to the review aggregation website Metacritic.
