= Age of Empires Online =

2011 online video game

- Developers: Robot Entertainment; Gas Powered Games
- Publisher: Microsoft Game Studios
- Series: Age of Empires
- Platform: Microsoft Windows
- Release: WW: August 16, 2011
- Genre: Massively multiplayer online real-time strategy game
- Mode: Multiplayer

Age of Empires Online is a discontinued multiplayer online real-time strategy game developed by Robot Entertainment and Gas Powered Games that was released on August 16, 2011. Based upon the gameplay of the Age of Empires series, it was originally developed by Robot Entertainment, but on February 24, 2011, Gas Powered Games, took over production. The game was published by Microsoft.

The game initially followed a freemium model, with the base game being free-to-play and premium content such as certain in-game items being purchasable through the game store. Subsequent updates to the game eventually made all aspects of the game completely free-to-play, with content previously purchased via microtransactions made purchasable using earnable in-game currency.

On March 27, 2012, the game premiered on Steam after a major overhaul patch which addressed complaints of an "MMO-like grind" and many other features, along with the debut of the Celtic civilization. On June 15, 2012 the premium content system was changed to offer the option to purchase all past and future content through "Empire points" earned in game, or by purchasing the points directly with real world money.

As of January 3, 2013, Microsoft ceased further development on the game. A Microsoft representative later announced on the forums that on August 22, 2013, the Games for Windows – Live Marketplace would be shut down, leaving the game only accessible by current or former players. In September 2013, it was announced that the game would remain functional until July 1, 2014 when the service would be shut down. The closure was due to the content being too expensive to maintain.

== Gameplay ==
Gameplay screenshot showing a battle scene

Age of Empires Online, like its predecessors, was a real-time strategy videogame. The game features much of the gameplay of the series, with the addition of a massive multiplayer online game element. The player possessed a capital city for each started civilization, that continued to exist when the player was offline. The game also featured gameplay systems novel to the series, such as the ability to craft items with earned materials and trading with other players.

The main gameplay revolved around the player developing a civilization from its birth to its peak and fall. To assure victory, the player had to gather and preserve resources to spend on new units, buildings and more advanced technology.

Civilian units, called villagers, were used to gather resources (hunting, fishing, farming, forestry, mining etc.). Resources could be traded, and also "spent" to train units, construct buildings, and research technologies.

=== Units ===
Age of Empires Online includes five classes of military units: Infantry, archers, cavalry, siege weaponry, and naval units. All military classes were developed to maintain a balance on gameplay, and thus avoid advantages between civilizations. As an example, a unit powerful against buildings may have been weak against a certain kind of cavalry. Unique units were available for the Greek, Egyptian, Celts, and Persian civilizations, either from the start of the game or through advisor cards. These civilization-specific units were generally more powerful, but could still be vulnerable to certain units. The priest was a special kind of military unit that has the ability to convert enemy units to the player's civilization, and to heal allied units.

Every player had a limit to the total number of units they could create—a population limit—but could not immediately use the entire potential population. The population limit increases with the number of houses or town centers in the player's village to a maximum of 200, with each house contributing five (or ten for the Norse) and each town center contributing 20 to the limit. There were two important features for unit management: the idle villager button, which helps players identify villagers that have not been assigned a task, and the town bell, which sends all of the player's villagers into the nearest town center, fortress or tower for safety.

=== Buildings ===
The buildings in Age of Empires Online were either economic or military buildings. Buildings were used to research technologies and upgrades that increased economic, military or unit-based efficiency, as well as to provide resources for the player. Each civilization had unique buildings, but some were common for all civilizations; the most important of these being the town center, where villagers were created, resources were stored, some technologies researched and in which the player could advance to the next technological age. The town center fired arrows at enemy units within range. Other economic buildings available included the storehouse for resources, farms, docks, and houses.

Military buildings included unit-producing buildings such as barracks, archery ranges, stables, and fortresses, as well as defensive buildings such as walls and towers. Military buildings performed research to improve the abilities of military units, increasing their strength, defensive capabilities, or other attributes. The fortress was a defensive building which trained a variety of units, including the civilization's unique units, and fired arrows at enemy units within range. It could only be built after a player had reached the third age. There were two other important defensive buildings: Walls and towers. Walls were used to prevent access for enemy units to an enclosed area, while friendly units could traverse the walls through inserted gates. Towers were equipped with the ability to fire arrows at enemy units, or garrison friendly units for protection, and could be used in conjunction with walls in establishing defense lines. Watch posts were used for extending the player's line of sight.

=== Capital city ===
The capital city was similar to the "Home city" concept implemented in Age of Empires III. The city functioned as the player's home base for their civilization. It continued to exist even when the player logged out of the game, and could not be attacked or altered by other players. Through the capital city, the player managed quests, improved technologies, sent mail, crafted items, participated in player to player trade, acquired and equipped new gear for individual units, and visited other players' cities. Stores built within the city could be visited by other players and currency used for the items purchased would add to the owner's funds. Unlike the home city from Age of Empires III where the player could only customize the look of buildings, the capital city was completely customizable; buildings and rewards could be placed anywhere on the city map as the player chose. Players could add buildings, rewards, houses as well as statues and bushes along with other things to decorate their capital city. "Vanity Island" existed to add new bushes and statues for the player to use to decorate their capital city. The city was also used as a gateway to other AI controlled cities within the region, where a player could visit and acquire new quests and items. The capital city also had many different buildings that the player could build. Craft schools, built from the city, produced gear and consumables for the player to use. Additionally, Microsoft released a crafting app for Windows Phone which a player could use to assist in crafting within the game.

=== Quests ===
Quests were the main PvE aspect of the game. Quests generally involved fighting and defeating the AI player. They were similar to the campaigns in previous Age of Empires games. They were completed when the objectives were met. Objectives in quests varied greatly. Some quests involved defeating enemies, others involved protecting a building or unit, and some involved collecting a certain amount of resources while defending from the enemy. Quest rewards included experience points, gold, empire points, chests, and sometimes gear. Certain quests also had a co-op option, which allowed the player to do the quest with another player to help them. Certain quests also had an "elite" version, which allows for the player to gain a greater amount of rewards, but were more difficult, presenting the player with a greater challenge.

The different civilizations also had different quest lines, e.g. the Celts had 80 unique quests that the other civilizations did not possess.

=== PvP ===
Player versus player, or PvP, was another aspect of the game. PvP in this game could be started in one of two ways: By using Sparta PvP to find a random match, or by using the arena in the capital city to play against a party member. Sparta PvP could be accessed by visiting the Sparta region in the world map. In Sparta PvP, there were two different types of PvP options. Standard PvP is the first option and allowed the player to use star techs from their tech-tree as well as any gear and advisors that they had equipped in their capital city. This PvP option was first to be released. Champion mode PvP was the second Sparta PvP option. This was also sometimes known as ranked PvP while Standard PvP is known as unranked PvP. In this PvP option all gears, star techs and advisors are disabled and cannot be used to start the players off at an even footing. All gear equipped would provide the units with a cosmetic change but would not affect their stats like they would normally do in PvE missions.

In Sparta PvP, the player starts off with a minimal amount of resources, a few villagers and their scout. Map selection is random and cannot be chosen by either players. Champion mode PvP results will also determine your TrueSkill ranking which is used to determine a player's rank globally as well as to help find the player a match and opponents for PvP. Currently, in Sparta PvP, there is an option for 1v1 PvP and 2v2 PvP. Rewards from Sparta PvP include experience points, empire points, gold and Sparta points which can be used in the stores in Sparta for chests, gear and consumables.

The August 2012 update also added a new spectator mode option for Arena PvP and the October 2012 update made Arena PvP (Standard or Champion mode) free for all players.

=== Civilizations ===
Seven civilizations were available. Premium civilizations start at level 1 and were the Greeks, Egyptians, Celts and Romans. Pro civilizations start at level 20 and were the Persians, Babylonians and the Norse. Each civilization had technologies and units that were unique to them.

== Development ==
The developers intended for the game to be reminiscent of the previous games from the series, yet have a "bold and more graphic look with a lot of character". Note the near identical units and building placement.

Age of Empires Online, under the working title Project S, was to be the first game developed by Robot Entertainment, a company founded by 45 of the 110 former staff members of Ensemble Studios, who created the Age of Empires series. The game was officially announced on August 16, 2010. Robot was hired by Microsoft to develop the game over a 24-month period. The entire studio team focused on it as their sole project, in an effort to earn startup funds for Robot's future projects.

During early production, Age of Empires Online was originally called Age of Empires IV. The development team had noticed that many other RTS game developers had moved away from the "economic game". The team felt that Age of Empires II: The Age of Kings had blended the economic and military aspects of the game perfectly, so they decided to play test it with hindsight. They noticed that many features had been lost or changed over time. It was during this time the team decided to do an "Age of Kings style gameplay in an Age of Empires setting". The designers were surprised that fans of the series were most fond of the simpler aspects of the previous titles. Former Age of Empires II lead designer Ian M. Fischer stated: "When we started floating some of the early [AoEO] out to people other pieces fell into place – I cannot tell you how many times I have had someone email me or talk to me at a show and mention how much they loved the villagers carrying big hunks of meat in the original Age or the priest "wololo."" From that point on, one of the goals was to invoke nostalgia from fans of the series when playing the game, despite the newer and updated features.

The decision to make the game online-only was based in part on the success of Age of Empires II and the popularity of its online integration with MSN Gaming Zone. Since online player interaction through the game was made a priority by the studio, two iterations of the game had to be created; a server version and a client version. This resulted in a heavily modified version of the BANG engine used in previous games of the series, along with requiring large amounts of additional server code and infrastructure to be implemented. Excluding the tools, Age of Empires Online contains over 1.2 million lines of code.

In designing the new look for the game, Robot had six artists come together to create a new art style which would look similar to the previous games from the series, yet look more "visually appealing", "timeless", and "bright". Among the art team was Ensemble Studios' first artist Brad Crow, who had worked on every Age of Empires game produced by the studio. The team implemented several ideas to give the game an improved core visual interface over that of its predecessors such as; increasing the field of view so that the player was able to see more on the screen, a tighter user interface to allow more of the field of play to be visible, a new building design to make them encompass less screen space — while also making them look more recognizable, and giving each unit a unique look and animation making them more easily distinguishable from each other.

The music and sound for the game was developed by GL33k and veteran video game composer Chris Rickwood. In composing the music, Rickwood strove to keep it in the spirit of Stephen Rippy's and Kevin McMullan's work from the prior games of the series.

On February 24, 2011, it was announced - first via Chris Taylor's Facebook page - that Gas Powered Games had taken over development from Robot Entertainment. According to a blog post, Gas Powered Games was already working on the game behind the scenes, creating content packs and moving to take over as lead developers, which was planned for some time. The game was released on August 16, 2011 with the Greek and Egyptian civilizations, followed by the Persians during the holiday. The Celts was postponed to March 2012, and was the first out of the four civilizations solely created from start to finish by Gas Powered Games since taking over development.

=== Support phase and official closure ===
On January 3, 2013, it was announced by AOEO Trajan (Kevin Perry) via the official community blog that Age of Empires Online had finished its development stage and was entering its support phase, and in September 2013, Microsoft Studios announced that the Age of Empires Online servers would be shut down on July 1, 2014. Producer Kevin Perry gave a presentation at the 2013 Game Developers Conference explaining the reasons for AoEO's closure and why he believed its business model ultimately failed, that being mostly due to the content being too expensive to create for the small daily active userbase.

== Premium content ==
=== Booster packs ===
Skirmish hall game setup screen. The Skirmish booster was added to fill an absent skirmish game-mode found in prior games of the series. Four player co-op support was later added as well.

Booster packs allowed for the player to customize PvE gameplay. The Defense of Crete booster pack was the first booster pack to be released for Age of Empires Online.

The Skirmish booster pack was the second booster pack to be released. The Skirmish booster pack allowed the player to modify every element of PvE gameplay

=== Vanity items ===
At launch, there were several vanity packs for the game. These packs provided the player with blueprints to stores that allowed the player to purchase new items to use to customize and decorate their capital city with in-game gold. In Project Celeste, all content including vanity packs were accessible for free, and could be earned by gathering Empire Points or Coin from doing any form of PvE or PvP level 40 content other than skirmish.

== Reception ==
Reception

Aggregate scores
Aggregator	Score
GameRankings	71.09%
Metacritic	70/100

Review scores
Publication	Score
1Up.com	C+
Edge	6/10
Eurogamer	7/10
GameSpot	6.5/10
IGN	7.0/10
Joystiq	7/10
PC Gamer (UK)	65/100
GamesRadar US	6/10
MeriStation	8/10
Softonic.com	6/10
PC Magazine	3.5/5
Vandal (20 minutos)	8/10
Browsergamez	84/100

Age of Empires Online received mixed reviews, garnering an aggregated review score of 70 on Metacritic. Some critics praised the co-operative missions, graphics, and familiar Age of Empires gameplay. However, many critics were critical of the price of the game's premium content.

Justin Calvert of GameSpot gave the game a 6.5/10, noting the PvP matchmaking system, enemy AI, and pricing as weak points, but stated: "Age of Empires Online effectively infuses its conventional real-time strategy gameplay with massively multiplayer online-style loot and leveling mechanics." IGN gave the game a 7/10, with reviewer Nick Kolan critical of the game's best features being restricted to the premium content purchases. However, Kolan closed by saying: "For all its flaws, I can't help but like Age of Empires Online. Caught somewhere between massively-multiplayer online role-playing game and hardcore competitive real-time strategy, Age of Empires Online delivers some of the most addictive parts of both." PC Magazine gave the game 3.5 out of 5 stars, and complimented the in-game artwork as "well done" and "nicely scalable", but felt the free to play aspect should have offered more to the player. Reviewer Matthew Murray wrote, "Age of Empires Online is highly enjoyable, and I found myself afflicted with one-more-turn-itis when a fiendish mission objective captivated (or frustrated) me. That's not the case with every game I play—and it's not nothing."

GameSpy reviewer Mike Sharkey panned the game in his initial review, but after the game received a major overhaul patch, he later stated: "Well, AoE Online is now on Steam, and courtesy of a massive spring patch, the vast majority of the problems I had with it have been addressed." PC Gamer initially gave the game a 65/100 at launch, but later reviewed the specific DLC Celts campaign giving it a score of 90/100 and calling it, "The best free RTS gaming you'll find, the Celts bring AoEO two steps closer to greatness." PC Gamer later summarized the game's major complaints during its initial launch and noted that many of them were addressed or improved by the developers.

Age of Empires Online was the third most played Games for Windows Live title for the year 2012 based on unique users. Upon its shutdown in 2014, Age of Empires Online had its players embark on 500 million single-player quests, another 13.7 million multiplayer quests, and two million arena matches in its three-year history.
