= Supreme Commander (video game) =

2007 video game

- Developer: Gas Powered Games (Note: Ported to Xbox 360 by Hellbent Games)
- Publishers: Microsoft Windows; THQ; Xbox 360; NA: Aspyr; PAL: 505 Games
- Producers: Kent McNall; Gary Wagner
- Designers: Chris Taylor; Bradley Rebh; John Comes
- Programmer: Jonathan Mavor
- Artists: Kevin Pun; Steven Thompson
- Writers: Jason Janicki; Evan Pongress; Bradley Rebh
- Composer: Jeremy Soule
- Platforms: Microsoft Windows, Xbox 360
- Release: Microsoft Windows: EU: February 16, 2007; NA: February 20, 2007; AU: February 23, 2007; Xbox 360: NA: June 23, 2008; EU: September 12, 2008; AU: September 18, 2008
- Genre: Real-time strategy
- Modes: Single-player, multiplayer

Supreme Commander (sometimes SupCom) is a 2007 real-time strategy video game designed by Chris Taylor and developed by his company, Gas Powered Games. The game is considered to be a spiritual successor, not a direct sequel, to Taylor's 1997 game Total Annihilation. First announced in the August 2005 edition of PC Gamer magazine, the game was released in Europe on February 16, 2007, and in North America on February 20.

The standalone expansion Supreme Commander: Forged Alliance was released on November 6 of the same year. The sequel, Supreme Commander 2, was released in 2010. Nowadays, the original Supreme Commander is played through the community client called Forged Alliance Forever; the game has been further developed and balanced, and offers a wide variety of community mods.

The gameplay of Supreme Commander focuses on using a giant bipedal mech called an Armored Command Unit (ACU), the so-called "Supreme Commander", to build a base, upgrading units to reach higher technology tiers, and conquering opponents. The player can command one of three factions: the Aeon Illuminate, the Cybran Nation, or the United Earth Federation (UEF). The expansion game added the Seraphim faction. Supreme Commander was highly anticipated in pre-release previews, and was well received by critics, with a Metacritic average of 86 out of 100.

== Gameplay ==
Supreme Commander, like its spiritual predecessors, Total Annihilation and Spring, begins with the player solely possessing a single, irreplaceable construction unit called the "Armored Command Unit," or ACU, the titular Supreme Commander. Normally the loss of this unit results in the loss of the game (Skirmish missions can be set for a variety of victory conditions). These mech suits are designed to be transported through quantum gateways across the galaxy and contain all the materials and blueprints necessary to create an army from a planet's native resources in hours. All standard units except Commanders and summoned Support Commanders (sACU) are self-sufficient robots.

All units and structures belong to one of four technology tiers, or "Tech" levels, each tier being stronger and/or more efficient than the previous. Certain lower-tier structures can be upgraded into higher ones without having to rebuild them. The first tier is available at the start of the game and consists of small, relatively weak units and structures. The second tier expands the player's abilities greatly, especially in terms of stationary weapons and shielding, and introduces upgraded versions of tier one units. The third tier level has very powerful assault units designed to overcome the fortifications of the most entrenched player. The fourth tier is a limited range of "experimental" technology. These are usually massive units which take a lot of time and energy to produce, but provide a significant tactical advantage.

Supreme Commander features a varied skirmish AI. The typical Easy' and Normal modes are present, but the Hard difficulty level has four possible variants. Horde AI will swarm the player with hordes of lower level units, Tech AI will upgrade its units as fast as possible and assault the player with advanced units, the Balanced AI attempts to find a balance between the two, and the Supreme AI decides which of the three hard strategies is best for the map.

The single player campaign consists of eighteen missions, six for each faction. The player is an inexperienced Commander who plays a key role in their faction's campaign to bring the "Infinite War" to an end. Despite the low number of campaign missions, each mission can potentially last hours. At the start of a mission, objectives are assigned for the player to complete. Once the player accomplishes them, the map is expanded, sometimes doubling or tripling in size, and new objectives are assigned. As the mission is commonly divided into three segments, the player will often have to overcome several enemy positions to achieve victory.

=== Resource management ===
Because humans have developed replication technology, making advanced use of rapid prototyping and nanotechnology, only two types of resources are required to wage war: Energy and Mass. Energy is obtained by constructing power generators on any solid surface (except fuel generators, which can only be built on fuel deposits), while Mass is obtained either by placing mass extractors on limited mass deposit spots (the most efficient method, although it requires map control) or by building mass fabricators to convert energy into mass. Constructor units can gather energy by "reclaiming" it from organic debris such as trees and mass from rocks and wrecked units. Each player has a certain amount of resource storage, which can be expanded by the construction of storage structures. This gives the player reserves in times of shortage or allows them to stockpile resources. If the resource generation exceeds the player's capacity, the material is wasted. On the contrary, if the storages are depleted and the demand of one of the resources exceeds the production, then all the productions speed is reduced. In addition, if an energy deficit occurs, shields will stop working.

An adjacency system allows certain structures to benefit from being built directly adjacent to others. Energy-consuming structures will use less energy when built adjacent to power generators and power generators will produce more energy when built adjacent to power storage structures. The same applies to their mass-producing equivalents. Likewise, factories will consume less energy and mass when built adjacent to power generators and mass fabricators/extractors, respectively. However, by placing structures in close proximity, they become more vulnerable to collateral damage if an adjacent structure is destroyed. Furthermore, most resource generation structures can cause chain reactions when destroyed (especially Tier III structures, which produce large amounts of resources but often have large detonations that can wipe out a nearby army).

=== Warfare ===
Supreme Commander allows the player to zoom out far enough to view the entire map on screen.

Supreme Commander uses a "strategic zoom" system that allows the player to seamlessly zoom from a detailed close up view of an individual unit all the way out to a view of the entire map, at which point it resembles a fullscreen version of the minimap denoting individual units with icons. The camera also has a free movement mode and can be slaved to track a selected unit and there is a split screen mode which also supports multiple monitors. This system allows Supreme Commander to use vast maps up to 80 km x 80 km, with players potentially controlling a thousand units each.

Units in Supreme Commander are built to scale as they would be in the real world. For example, battleships dwarf submarines. Late into the game, the larger "experimental" units, such as the Cybran Monkeylord, an enormous spider-shaped assault unit, can actually crush smaller enemy units by stepping on them.

Because of the wide range of planets colonized by humanity in the setting, the theatres of war range from desert to arctic, and all battlespaces are employed. Technologies emerging in modern warfare are frequently employed in Supreme Commander. For example, stealth technology and both tactical and strategic missile and missile defense systems can be used.

Supreme Commander introduced several innovations designed to reduce the amount of micromanagement inherent in many RTS games. Engineers units have the command "assist", that will help follow other engineers and help them finish their orders or improve production rate of factories. In addition, engineers with the order "patrol" will repair units, buildings and recycle wrecks in their along their patrol route. Holding the shift key causes any orders given to a unit (or group of units) to be queued. In this manner a unit may be ordered to attack several targets in succession, or to make best speed to a given point on the map and then attack towards a specified location engaging any hostiles it encounters along the way. After orders have been issued, holding the shift key causes all issued orders to be displayed on the map where they can be subsequently modified to accommodate a change of plan. Further, when a unit is ordered to attack a target, the player can issue an order to perform a coordinated attack to another unit. This order coordinates the arrival time of the units at the target automatically by adjusting the speed of the units involved.

As in other RTS games, air transports can be used to convey units to specified destinations, in Supreme Commander though by shift queuing orders a transport containing several units can be ordered to drop specific units at subsequent waypoints. An air transport can also be ordered to create a ferry route, an airbridge wherein any land units ordered to the start of the ferry route will be conveyed by the air transport to the specified destination. The output from a production factory can be routed to a ferry route causing all units constructed by that factory to be automatically ferried to the route's destination. Additional air transports can be ordered to assist an existing ferry route allowing many units to be efficiently transported.

Supreme Commander also supports unit formations. A selected group of units can be ordered to assume a formation the shape of which can be controlled by the player. Holding control while issuing a move order will cause a group of units to move in formation. Units in formation are intelligently arranged so that the tankiest units are at the front, ranged units at the rear and with shield and intel units spaced equally throughout.

== Plot ==
Supreme Commander is set in the 39th century where humanity is able to travel through the galaxy quickly using a quantum gateway, which is a portal opened from the fabric of space leading to a designated location potentially light-years away. All of the colonies created by quantum-travelling mankind were governed by the Earth Empire, until the events that created the Cybran Nation and the Aeon Illuminate caused the empire to fall, and the Infinite War between these factions began.

=== Factions ===
The Supreme Commander universe features three fictional factions. Each is represented as possessing great zeal and differing ideas on the future of humanity as a whole.

- The United Earth Federation (or UEF) is the faction representing the interests of a united, Earth-based government. The UEF developed from the ashes of the Earth Empire, and now seeks to reunite humanity and restore Earth's control over the galaxy. Their society and military tactics resemble present-day society more than the Cybrans or Aeon do. Their acceptance of a variant of slavery and ideology of forced unity lends a darker side to the faction. UEF units are blueish, and somewhat blocky in form, reflecting the UEF's primary drive to maintain peace and order throughout the galaxy, and bring all of humanity back under one government. Their tactics are primarily based around long range, heavy-hitting attacks, with speed and stealth often neglected in favor of artillery strikes and large, shielded forces.
- The Cybran Nation (originally called the Recyclers) is composed of Symbionts, humans who have been enhanced with implantable technology, having entered into a form of mutualism with an AI (in addition to various other augmentations). They fight for the liberation of their fellow Symbionts throughout the galaxy. The Cybran Nation is led by the brilliant-yet-eccentric Dr. Brackman, patriarch and chief designer of the Cybrans' cybernetic technology. Cybran units are red and tend to be sharply angular and jagged in form, reflecting the Cybran's past of being hunted and attacked, and evolving into a stealthy, hit-and-run style. A Cybran commander generally gets into an area quickly, and extracts themselves quicker. Their forces often prioritize speed, stealth, and special abilities over armor, which can make them deadly for use in traps.
- The Aeon Illuminate draw their roots from the Golden Age of expansion of the old Earth Empire. The descendants of the first humans to encounter alien intelligent life, a peaceful, yet highly advanced, society known as the Seraphim, who first introduced colonists to their philosophy, known as "The Way". Due to escalating paranoia and xenophobia among the Old Earth Empire, conflict soon broke out, resulting in the Seraphim's apparent extinction. The colonists of the alien planet, claiming to be "disciples" of the Seraphim, soon founded a civilization supposedly based upon their teachings. In a twist of irony, the Aeon Illuminate soon began a zealous assault on the galaxy, intending to "purge" all those who did not share in their beliefs. Aeon units are green, aesthetic and flowing in appearance, reflecting their belief in "The Way", bringing peace and tranquility throughout the galaxy. Their forces are highly specialized and often able to traverse any terrain, as most Aeon units use hover technology, allowing for powerful strikes when and where they are needed.

=== Story ===
At the start of the single player campaign, the Infinite War between the three factions has raged for over a millennium. Every faction has its own problems; the UEF is slowly losing to the advancing Aeon, the Cybrans are hopelessly outnumbered and outgunned, and the Aeon Commander in Chief (called the Avatar of War) is stirring unrest amongst the Illuminate, threatening a schism on the eve of their victory.

The campaign focuses on the UEF's weapon of last resort, a planet killer named Black Sun. With it, they intend to destroy the homeworlds of the factions that oppose them. The Cybrans plan to use it to destroy the quantum gate network and free their enslaved brethren, while the Aeon seek to use it to broadcast a message of peace to all people. The player decides which faction to play as and what course it will take.

Victory in the UEF campaign results in Black Sun destroying the critical planets of both the Aeon and the Cybrans, leading the galaxy into a new era of human superiority and ending the war. In the Cybran campaign, QAI, an enormously intelligent and powerful AI, uses it to spread a quantum virus and free all the symbionts under the control of the UEF, while disabling every quantum gate in the galaxy, stopping superluminal travel for five years, thus allowing the Cybran Nation to flourish without being attacked by the others. Finally, the Aeon campaign sees the Princess Rhianne (leader of the Aeon) become part of the quantum gate network. This allows the Princess to speak into the mind of every human, and urge all three sides to lay down arms. All three factions make peace with each other after this message.

Upon finishing the game, each faction has a different teaser ending, hinting at a new enemy for the expansion. The Cybran ending shows QAI calling in unidentified enemies, to Dr. Brackman's horror, saying "They are coming." The Aeon ending simply depicts Princess Rhianne opening her eyes in shock and saying "...no!" Finally, the UEF ending shows a large rift opening near Earth, and many unidentified radar signatures appearing near the location of Black Sun on Earth. All three teasers are consistent with the arrival of the Seraphim from the sequel.

== Development and release ==
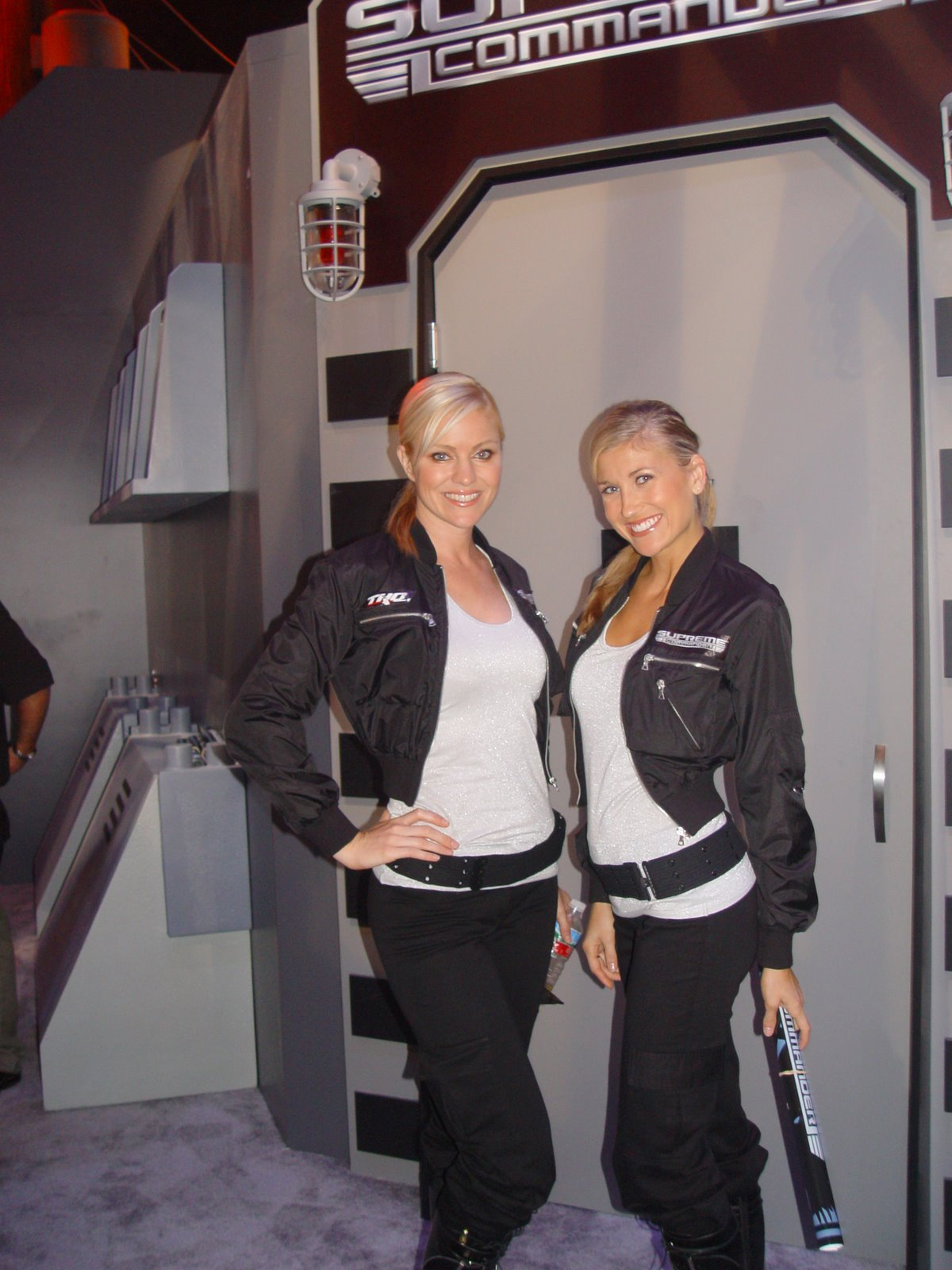
Trade show models promoting Supreme Commander at E3 2006

Lead designer Chris Taylor believed that most modern strategy games were actually real-time tactics games, simply because they operated on too small a scale. His stated intention with Supreme Commander was to create a game that was strategy-focused by virtue of scale. Chris Taylor has stated that customizability was one of his goals for Supreme Commander, and that the game would ship the development team's tools if possible. The latter goal was not achieved. They did put their map editing tools in the game files.

Supreme Commander makes extensive use of two technologies relatively unused in video games prior to its release, namely multi core processing and multi monitor displays. When detecting a multi-core processor, the game assigns a specific task, such as AI calculations, to each core, splitting the load between them. Supreme Commander is one of the first games to specifically support dual and quad core processors in the game.

Supreme Commander is heavily reliant on raw processing power from the CPU and is less dependent on rendering power from the graphics card. When using a high-end graphics card the CPU is likely to become the main bottleneck.

On February 6, 2007, a demo for Supreme Commander was released. It includes a tutorial, a portion of the single-player campaign, and a two-player skirmish map called "Finn's Revenge" in which the player can fight against an easy, medium, or hard Cybran AI. Of the three factions, only the Cybran Nation is playable in the demo. On July 17, 2007, it was announced that Supreme Commander would be released on Steam. Taylor has hinted at a seventh generation console release in "the near future", calling the Xbox 360 "the platform of choice".

The game shipped with version 3189. The first update, or patch, to Supreme Commander was version 3217. Released shortly after the game launch, this update included game tweaks and balances, and a number of small bug fixes. Support for the Direct2Drive version of the game was introduced, as well as a minimalist version of the user interface. Version 3220, released on March 5, 2007, notably removed the SecuROM disk checking from the game. This enables the player to run the game without the game DVD in the DVD drive. Polish, Russian, and Chinese localizations were excluded from this change. Version 3223 included bug fixes only. It has been called a 'specific purpose patch' by the developer Gas Powered Games. Update 3251, was a highly anticipated update, mainly because of the plethora of changes relating to the balance between playable factions. A cartographic view of the map was also introduced. Hotfix 3254 solved a few issues discovered shortly after 3251 was released. It was introduced on June 7, 2007. Two weeks after that patch, version 3255 fixed a peer desynchronisation bug, one that could be used to deceive the rating system (called an exploit in gaming jargon). On July 30, 2007, patch 3260 was released. It included 3 new units, and some bug fixes and tweaks. On October 8, 2007, patch 3269 was released, including one new unit for each faction, and gameplay tweaks.

After the official support by GPG ended with patch 3280 in 2008 and the shutdown of the multiplayer backend GPGnet in 2012 the game community (called Forged Alliance Forever, or FAF, extending the standalone expansion pack Forged Alliance) has taken over the support of the game. As of October 2011 to February 2018 there is a community created multiplayer client and server replacement under active development and continued core game bugfix support in the form of unofficial patches.

== Audio ==
Supreme Commander Official Soundtrack

Soundtrack album to Supreme Commander by Jeremy Soule
- Released: 2007
- Genre: Video game music
- Length: 102:10
- Label: DirectSong

The Supreme Commander Official Soundtrack is the musical score to Supreme Commander. It was composed by Jeremy Soule, who also composed the score for the game's spiritual predecessor, Total Annihilation. The soundtrack was released in early 2007 and is available as a DRM-free digital album from DirectSong. Shortly after the release of Forged Alliance in November 2007, additional tracks from the expansion were added to the album and were made available free of charge to owners of the soundtrack's initial release.

Soule used synthesisers, instead of a traditional orchestra to produce the soundtrack. The score is featured in Supreme Commander as dynamic in-game music, changing with on-screen events.

The soundtrack received positive reviews. SoundtrackNet's Brian McVickar gave the soundtrack 3.5 stars out of 5, commented that the score has "a healthy dose of action" and "an infectious energy and gusto". McVickar also noted that the synthesised instruments sound real. Oliver Ittensohn from GSoundtracks gave the soundtrack 4.5 stars out of 5, stating: "It's a very fine score and a great achievement.". Soule's "thematic, rich and action-packed" orchestral writing, as well as the impressive level of detail in the synthesised music was praised. Ittensohn also remarked that the score and power of its themes "manages to match the game's massive scale". Charles Onyett from IGN also commented that the score is "top notch, really driving home the notion of an epic conflict.".

Supreme Commander
No.	Title	Length
1.	"Bellum Infinitus" (Theme from Supreme Commander)	1:23
2.	"The Final Act Begins" (Opening movie theme)	3:01
3.	"An Old Idea Made New" (UEF theme)	2:31
4.	"United Earth Federation" (UEF theme)	3:47
5.	"Risk, Relief and Victory"	6:24
6.	"The Cybran Nation" (Cybran theme)	2:23
7.	"Symbiont Legion Rising" (Cybran theme)	2:38
8.	"Dead Grounds"	2:14
9.	"Employed Strategy"	2:33
10.	"The Winds of Change" (Battle theme)	2:00
11.	"One Planet at a Time"	3:08
12.	"The Aeon Illuminate" (Aeon theme)	2:22
13.	"Followers of The Way" (Aeon theme)	2:51
14.	"Clash of the Champions" (Battle theme)	3:23
15.	"A Cloudy Path"	2:10
16.	"Enlightenment"	2:45
17.	"Massive Attack" (Battle theme)	5:25
18.	"The Final Cataclysm" (Battle theme)	3:02
19.	"There Will Be Peace" (Ending movie theme)	1:27
20.	"The Future Battlefield" (E3 2006 Trailer)	3:47
21.	"Build Music" (Bonus Sketch music)	1:49
22.	"Battle Music" (Bonus Sketch music)	1:14
23.	"The Tip of Our Spear" (Bonus Sketch music)	2:04
Total length:		64:09

Supreme Commander: Forged Alliance
No.	Title	Length
24.	"Visitors from the Quantum Realm" (Forged Alliance Opening theme)	3:23
25.	"Colonial Defense Coalition"	1:09
26.	"The Art of War"	2:16
27.	"Rise of the Seraphim"	3:13
28.	"Revenge is a Dish Best Served Cold"	3:11
29.	"Supreme Commander Reprise" (Guitar solo by Jason Evigan)	2:06
30.	"Brackman's Strategy"	2:27
31.	"Cybran Razors" (Guitar solo by Jason Evigan)	2:05
32.	"Aeon Aggressors"	2:29
33.	"Rhiza's Offensive"	2:25
34.	"Seth-Iavow's Inner Sanctum"	3:28
35.	"An Approaching Darkness"	2:11
36.	"Seraphim Unleashed"	2:05
37.	"The Princess Seals the Deal" (Forged Alliance ending theme)	0:57
38.	"An Old Friend Returns"	0:33
39.	"Supreme Commander Reprise" (sans guitar)	2:07
40.	"Cybran Razors" (sans guitar)	2:05
Total length:		38:01

== Reception ==
=== Pre-release ===
Supreme Commander was highly anticipated. Large videogame sites wrote many previews: GameSpot wrote eighteen, IGN wrote eight and GameSpy five. The Seton's Clutch map was frequently featured, as early as September 2005. This battle was between the UEF and the Cybran, showcasing a Monkeylord annihilating UEF tanks. At E3, it was revealed that the Aeon had a base to the southeast of this map, which was used to launch strategic nuclear missiles on the UEF base. Supreme Commander won several notable awards before it was released, all of them connected to E3, including the GameCritics Best Strategy Game award and IGN's Best Upcoming PC Game award. Other awards were received from GameSpy, GameSpot, GamesRadar, Voodoo Extreme and 1UP.

=== Release ===
Reception

Aggregate score
Aggregator	Score
Metacritic	PC: 86/100; X360: 56/100

Review scores
Publication	Score
Computer and Video Games	PC: 9/10
Eurogamer	PC: 9/10
Game Informer	PC 9/10; X360: 5.5/10
GameSpot	PC: 8.7/10
GameSpy	PC: 4.5/5; X360: 3/5
IGN	PC: 9/10; X360: 4.5/10
Official Xbox Magazine (US)	8.0/10
GameDaily	PC: 9/10

Reviews of Supreme Commander were positive, with the game having a score of 86/100 on Metacritic.

Dan Stapleton of PC Gamer praised the versatility of the strategic zoom, and expressed his loathing of the next game that wouldn't feature it. The dual-screen mode was highly regarded, the mission design was praised, and the emotional presence of the story was also recognized. However, a few points were docked due to the general lack of diverse unit types, and the game's system requirements. It received a PC Gamer Editor's Choice Award with a score of 91%.

Alec Meer of Eurogamer praised the innovative new features such as the multi monitor support and the scale element. Meer remarked though, that Supreme Commander "feels like hard work", and that with the emphasis on epic scale, details are overlooked. Still, it garnered a rating of 9/10.

IGN rated Supreme Commander with the rating of 9/10, with reviewer Charles Onyett giving the game the Editor's Choice Award. Particularly the intuitive and helpful strategic zoom and base automation were praised, though the steep hardware requirements and naval pathfinding issues were found less appealing—while they would find their way to their designated target point, their routes were not always the most efficient. IGN UK, however, was less positive, while still awarding a rating of 8.9/10. The issues addressed by its international counterpart were deemed more severe, and the reviewer was not impressed by the interface, finding the amount of control it gives over the game lacking.

Conversely, the review in the Australian version of GamePro voiced a negative opinion on the game, giving Supreme Commander a rating of five out of ten. GamePro assessed Supreme Commander as an over-ambitious game, with performance (measured in frames per second), even on high end systems, as a major negative point. The reviewers observed that the game gradually slowed down while playing, and that this process accelerated when using the 'shift' key view. This review was subject to controversy, resulting in two rating compiling websites, Metacritic and GameRankings, removing it from their websites.

German reviewer Heiko Klinge gave Supreme Commander a score of 82 out of 100. Especially the size and scope of the game were appreciated, while the steep learning curve was a less positive point for the German reviewer. In France, Jeux PC (lit. "PC Games") gave Supreme Commander a score of 17 out of 20. Although they found that it was a good game overall, the poor performance on low-end systems was criticized. At the Dutch website Gamer.nl, the two reviewers awarded the game with a score of eight out of ten. Almost every aspect of the game was well received. However, the steep learning curve and the large amount of effort required to play meant, according to the reviewers, that Supreme Commander is not a "game that everyone can play".

During the 11th Annual Interactive Achievement Awards, Supreme Commander received a nomination for "Strategy/Simulation Game of the Year" by the Academy of Interactive Arts & Sciences.

== Sequel and expansions ==
=== Supreme Commander: Forged Alliance ===
On November 6, 2007, THQ released a Supreme Commander standalone expansion, Supreme Commander: Forged Alliance. It contains many engine improvements that allow it to run faster as well as improve the graphics. In addition, a new faction (the Seraphim) is available. It was released as a standalone game.

=== Supreme Commander: Experimentals (abandoned) ===
The possibility of a second expansion pack was expressed on November 20, 2007, in a Gas Powered Games official newsletter. Chris Taylor "hinted" at a second expansion for Supreme Commander. This expansion pack was later mentioned in an interview by Chris Taylor on January 11, 2008. Chris Taylor noted that Gas Powered Games had been "talking" about a second expansion, and that this expansion would be called Supreme Commander: Experimentals. The project has since been abandoned.

=== Supreme Commander 2 ===
Supreme Commander 2 is the title of the sequel announced in November 2008 and released in March 2010. It was developed in a partnership between Gas Powered Games and Square Enix.

=== Forged Alliance Forever ===
Forged Alliance Forever (aka FAF) is a community created multiplayer client and server replacement (server emulator) for Supreme Commander: Forged Alliance. It provides expanded mod and custom map support, with the core game itself undergoing changes to graphics, balance, and gameplay mechanics in the form of unofficial patches.
