= Supreme Commander: Forged Alliance =

Stand-alone 2007 video game expansion

- Developer: Gas Powered Games
- Publishers: THQ, Square Enix
- Designers: Bradley Rebh; Mike Marr
- Composer: Jeremy Soule
- Platform: Microsoft Windows
- Release: November 6, 2007 (US); November 23, 2007 (Europe)
- Genre: Real-time strategy
- Modes: Single-player, multiplayer

Supreme Commander: Forged Alliance is a stand-alone real-time strategy video game released at the end of October 2007 as the expansion to Supreme Commander. The second title in the franchise, it was similarly developed by Gas Powered Games and published by THQ.

As a standalone expansion, it is possible to play Forged Alliance without owning the original game, although without a valid CD key for Supreme Commander, online play is limited to the new faction, the Seraphim. Besides the new playable faction, Forged Alliance adds new gameplay features to the game, several new units for the three preexisting factions, and has optimizations for increased performance in response to issues with the original game.

== Gameplay ==
Gameplay in Forged Alliance is largely the same as in the original Supreme Commander. The player uses a giant bipedal mech called an Armored Command Unit (or ACU) to build an army with which they can conquer their opponents. Forged Alliance expands on the original gameplay mechanics, adding new units, modifying old ones, and introducing other improvements to the user interface. The most notable addition to this expansion is the addition of a new faction, the Seraphim. In addition, the three original factions—the United Earth Federation (UEF), Cybran Nation, and Aeon Illuminate—also receive a number of new units. Other new content includes new maps. Several improvements to the controls and behind the scenes mechanics have been made as well. The interface has been revamped, as well as improved pathfinding and aircraft flight dynamics.

The original Supreme Commander allowed the player to employ all four traditional battlespaces—air, information, land and sea. Forged Alliance adds the ability for the UEF faction to construct orbital weaponry which the player can control. These satellites are impossible to harm directly, forcing opponents to find and destroy the control centers maintaining them.

== Plot ==
=== Setting ===
The game supreme commander is set in the 39th century in which humanity is able to travel through the galaxy quickly using a quantum tunnel, a portal opened in the fabric of space leading to a designated location potentially light-years away. Tunneling let humankind establish many colonies, which were governed by a centralized Earth Empire. As the number of human worlds grew, however, its control eventually weakened, and the Empire collapsed. The Empire's remnants formed the United Earth Federation; a race of cybernetically-enhanced humans seeking independence formed the Cybran Nation; and colonists who befriended and embraced the religion of the dying alien Seraphim formed the Aeon Illuminate. The three factions came into conflict, starting the Infinite War. One thousand years later, the events of Supreme Commander take place, ending the war.

=== Supreme Commander endings ===
All three endings (one for each faction) for the Supreme Commander campaigns feature teaser endings after the credits as a reference to the (then unannounced) upcoming expansion. The Cybran ending shows the Quantum Artificial Intelligence (QAI) supercomputer calling in unidentified enemies, and then to Dr. Brackman's horror, saying "They are coming". The Aeon ending simply depicts Princess Rhianne, the leader of the faction, opening her eyes in shock and exclaiming "No!". The UEF ending shows many unidentified radar signatures appearing near the location of Black Sun on Earth.

=== The Seraphim ===
The new playable faction, the Seraphim, are a race of aliens long thought to have gone extinct. The colonists who befriended and embraced the religion of the dying alien Seraphim formed the Aeon Illuminate.

=== Synopsis ===
The game takes place shortly after the first game, which ended with the firing of the Black Sun, a powerful weapon capable of firing a beam through the Quantum Gates to destroy enemy planets. The Seraphim, an alien race long thought to have gone extinct, have exploited the firing of Black Sun to create a rift from the Quantum Realm they inhabit to Earth. Once through the rift, they wreak a path of destruction through the civilized galaxy, leaving Earth and most of the core worlds of the UEF in ruins. With most of the UEF's key political and military leaders lost, including General Samantha Clarke who died while fighting on Capella, General Hall and Brigadier General Fletcher lead the last of the UEF Military. QAI, the once-loyal Cybran supercomputer built by Dr. Brackman, has been compromised and is waging war on behalf of the Seraphim. It cripples the Cybran Nation's military, forcing Dr. Brackman and Dostya, the most experienced Cybran commander remaining, to retreat to the furthest reaches of space. The Aeon Illuminate are divided over the arrival of the murderous Seraphim from whom they once learned what seemed the peaceful Way; many take sides with the Seraphim as the Order of the Illuminate, led by Evaluator Kael, and brand Princess Rhianne a traitor and heretic. Crusader Rhiza leads a handful of forces loyal to the Princess in a guerrilla-style campaign. Shortly afterward, the UEF and Cybran factions ally and form the Coalition, an alliance against the Seraphim, with the Aeon Loyalists joining afterward despite Dr. Brackman's reservations.

Before battle commences in the first mission, the player must choose a faction to swear loyalty to. This can be the UEF, Cybran Nation, or Aeon Illuminate loyal to Princess Rhianne. The overall plot and outcome of the campaign remains the same, although certain commanders respond differently or reveal different information to the player at several points in the campaign.

The game begins with the protagonist defending the Coalition base on Griffin IV, the last major UEF base and last line of defense against the seemingly inexorable onslaught of the Seraphim and the Order. After the player chooses a side and helps Fletcher hold back the attacking Seraphim and Illuminate, it is discovered that Princess Rhianne of the Aeon Illuminate, thought to have been killed by the Order, is alive, hiding in a secret retreat. She is rescued by Coalition forces, and is able to organize many disenfranchised Aeon who are troubled by the actions of the Seraphim and the Order. It is also discovered that there is a traitor within the Coalition, who is leaking information to the Seraphim and the Order of the Illuminate. Both the UEF and Aeon focus on reorganizing their forces while the Cybrans focus on uncovering the identity of the traitor. Cybran forces controlled by QAI are also encountered during several key battles.

During an infiltration mission with Dostya, the traitor is eventually revealed to be Hex5, a Cybran spy formerly loyal to Dr. Brackman and Dostya, now serving QAI. Hex5 ambushes and kills Dostya, forcing the player to survive a difficult defense until they are recalled. Afterwards, the Coalition discovers that the rift from the Quantum Realm is unstable, and that the Seraphim they are only beginning to push back are merely the first wave. The Seraphim are building a Quantum Arch on Earth to stabilize the rift; its completion will herald the arrival of endless Seraphim reinforcements. Thus, the Coalition plans to launch an all-out assault on Earth.

Dr. Brackman personally vows to destroy QAI, and therefore accompanies the player in a mission to destroy QAI's primary node, which also kills Hex5. Afterwards, they use codes from QAI's remains to gate directly to Earth, where the final assault is being prepared by Rhiza and Fletcher. As the Coalition progresses to destroy the Arch, Fletcher turns on the Coalition and quickly regards all Cybran and Aeon as enemies, despite General Hall's attempt to defuse the situation, forcing the player to kill him. Afterwards, the player proceeds to the Arch and successfully destroys it. Immediately afterward, Princess Rhianne enters the rift to the Quantum Realm and seals it from within, destroying the Seraphim's only way of accessing the human universe and saving humanity. By doing so, she sacrifices her life, but brings an end to the Seraphim War.

At the end of the campaign, QAI reboots itself and seem to be coming back online. However, QAI's condition and loyalty is unknown. It is possible that the cutscene was meant as a teaser for another sequel titled Experimentals (which has been cancelled).

== Development ==
On June 28, 2007, the first 5 screenshots were released on GameSpot's Q&A with lead designer Bradley Rebh. On July 7, 2007, its first trailer was released, along with 8 screenshots from the trailer. On July 11, 2007, GameSpot had another preview, revealing that there are 110 new units, including a new experimental unit for each existing faction. On July 12, 2007, Gamershell released an HD version of the trailer; an additional 5 screenshots were released on GameSpot, IGN released 12 old & new screenshots. On July 14, 2007, GameSpy's preview tells of the backstory & campaign. On July 16, 2007, info on some of the 'old' factions' new units, including space warfare/orbital weaponry, were posted on GPGnet. On August 18, 2007, GameSpot had a 'profile preview' in which characters & a timeline were revealed. The game was released first in the US on November 6, 2007.

== Community support ==
=== Forged Alliance Forever ===
After the official support by GPG ended with the beta patch 3603 in 2009 and the shutdown of the multiplayer backend GPGnet in 2012 the game community took over the support of the game, with a Server emulator. A multiplayer client was created by the Forged Alliance Forever community and has been running since 2011 and since its release many of the players have migrated across. The client features many upgrades to the official one, including a working replay vault, live replays, allowing watching of ongoing games, a mod vault and a map vault. Also, the FAF community has continued to balance and patch the game with own-made so called community patches. Several new modes are also available, including a four-way war between factions over a galaxy spread of planets, a co-operative campaign for the original Supreme Commander campaigns and the Forged Alliance campaign. As of August 2024, FAF continues to be developed, and has seen a steadily increasing playerbase and continued participation in community hosted tournaments, with some of the matches replayed and commentated since 2013.

== Reception ==
Reception

Aggregate score
Aggregator	Score
Metacritic	81/100

The reception to Supreme Commander: Forged Alliance has been generally positive, on the same level as that for the original game. On November 7, 2007, GameSpot's review gave it a score of 8.5 out of 10.0.
