= Dungeon Siege II =

2005 video game

- Developer: Gas Powered Games
- Publisher: Microsoft Game Studios
- Composer: Jeremy Soule
- Series: Dungeon Siege
- Platform: Windows
- Release: NA: August 16, 2005; AU: August 26, 2005; EU: September 2, 2005
- Genre: Action role-playing
- Modes: Single-player, multiplayer

Dungeon Siege II is a 2005 action role-playing video game developed by Gas Powered Games and released for Microsoft Windows. It is the sequel to 2002's Dungeon Siege and continues its storyline. An expansion, Broken World, was released in 2006.

The game play centers around a class system of Melee, Ranger, Nature magic and Combat magic with the introduction of two additional classes in the expansion pack "Broken World". The player controlled protagonist finds themselves changing alliances once their friend, Drevin, is killed in the main story line and works to defeat the villain Valdis. Players can recruit NPC players with unique personalities and attributes which offers depth to game play.

The game was favorably received upon release, scoring an 80 on Metacritic and winning PC Gamer US' "Best Roleplaying Game 2005" award.

== Gameplay ==
While in a cave, the player's party attacks a group of monsters, while one monster summons a creature.

Unlike Dungeon Siege, Dungeon Siege II takes a more varied approach to its gameplay. The original game was criticized for being too automated and lacking replay value. Developer Gas Powered Games improved the old system into a more versatile one that incorporates additional elements of strategy.

By default, the new system turns off much of the original game's combat automation and requires players to click once for each individual attack of their selected character. For players who liked the combat system of the previous version, the new system can be made to behave more like it. Clicking on a monster and holding the right mouse button makes the character continuously attack until the monster dies. There are options that allow the player's characters to automatically defend themselves and/or automatically continue to attack their targets, much like in the old system.

In the original Dungeon Siege, the four character specialties (also known as classes) differed only in the items and spells they were allowed to use. In Dungeon Siege II, each specialty (Melee, Ranged, Nature Magic, Combat Magic) has a unique set of skills, that determines a character's particular strengths. For example, melee-oriented characters can get better at using a shield to defend their allies or they can improve their two-handed weapon skills to more effectively attack opponents. As in the original game, multi-classing (distributing experience and skills to more than one class) is possible, but it is best to do so with caution. A character learning skills in too many different areas may find themselves spread too thin and unable to perform any role effectively.

In the expansion pack for Dungeon Siege II, "Broken World", two new character classes have been introduced. These classes are multi-class characters: the Fist of Stone being a multi-class of Melee and Nature Magic, and the Blood Assassin being a multi-class of Ranged and Combat Magic. These new classes have been given their own specialised skill trees in addition to the others, allowing them to multiclass more easily without being at as much of a disadvantage. For example, the Fist of Stone is able to cause small earthquakes when attacking to keep up with the damage output of a pure melee character, and the Blood Assassin is able to cause targets to hemorrhage blood to keep up with the damage output of a pure ranged character (as they multi-class, they cannot upgrade their weaponry as often and would otherwise be weaker in combat).

Another change in Dungeon Siege II is the addition of the Hero Powers system. Powers are special abilities that characters can use when normal attacks do not suffice; they include abilities like invincibility for the entire party and the power to summon a lightning strike that damages all enemies in the area. They are acquired when certain skills are trained to a certain level. Each power has 3 levels, each requiring more skill points to get. Powers increase in potency as characters level.

Like its predecessor, Dungeon Siege II is a party-based role-playing game. Players can have up to four characters in a party under the first difficulty setting (Mercenary), five characters in Veteran difficulty, and six in Elite difficulty. Aside from being able to recruit non-player characters (NPCs) that function much like the player's own character, players can also buy pets that grow after being fed items. However, unlike its predecessor, the hirable NPCs have unique personalities and can converse with the player and each other at certain points in the game; they even have their own personal side quests. Pets start off with a basic attack (and spell if applicable), gain a Power upon reaching the third level of growth, and finally gain an emanation upon becoming Mature. Emanations are special pet-only auras that provide beneficial effects to friendly characters within range (such as increased mana regeneration).

The magic system in Dungeon Siege II remains largely unchanged. Combat Mages and Nature Mages still have access to separate spell lines that increase in power as the character levels. However, combat and nature magic are much more distinct from each other than in Dungeon Siege. Combat magic focuses on causing massive amounts of damage and weakening enemies with curses, while nature magic focuses more on healing, summoning and strengthening party members with embrace and wrath enchantments.

Parties are limited to a maximum of two concurrent buffs. Pets' spells count towards this buff limit, but their emanations (see above) do not. Weapon enhancement spells, used by the Fist of Stone and Blood Assassin characters introduced in the expansion, also do not count towards this limit. Each enemy may only have one debuff placed on it at a time. All negative effects count towards this limit, including curses and stuns.

Dungeon Siege II's "game over" system is similar to that in many other role-playing games. When a character loses enough health, they usually fall into a state of unconsciousness. The character falls to the ground, unable to move, and must wait for their health to slowly regenerate itself or wait for magical healing from another character. If a character is hit hard enough by an enemy, or if an enemy is persistent in attacking an unconscious character, the character may eventually be killed. Once death occurs, the character can no longer be healed and must be resurrected by another character or by a special Necromancer NPC in town. If the entire party is slain, the party may choose to continue by respawning back in town without their equipment. Their equipment is left on their corpses. The party must then find a way to retrieve its fallen equipment, either by venturing back to the characters' corpses or by having them summoned to town by a Necromancer NPC for a monetary charge.

=== Multiplayer ===
Dungeon Siege II supports multiplayer cooperative gaming over LAN, the Internet, and the GameSpy network. Multiple players can cooperate in separate-but-allied parties. There is a total limit of eight characters, though only four can be player-controlled. Purchased pets count towards this limit but summoned creatures (from spells) do not. There is an unsupported "old school" mode in multiplayer, allowing up to eight players to play simultaneously. To enable this, add "oldschool=true" (without quotes) to command line or the .ini file.

For LAN and Internet play, saved games are stored on the players' own computers. For GameSpy play, saved games and characters are stored on GameSpy's servers. The GameSpy environment limits the amount of online cheating that can take place, but as of late beta, the possibility still existed. GameSpy characters can be downloaded from the GameSpy servers to players' computers, where they can then be used for Internet, LAN, and single-player games. The reverse is not true: GameSpy characters can only be created and leveled on the GameSpy network itself. GS network makes an attempt to support only original games; unlicensed copies are blocked if they cannot mimic the CD-Key. Online play may therefore also not be possible with a second-hand game. The Steam version of Dungeon Siege II does not support multiplayer functionality.

== Plot ==
The game begins with the player-controlled protagonist and their friend, Drevin, serving as mercenaries in the army of Valdis, a warlord who has aligned himself with a race of Dark Wizards and wields the magical Sword of Zaramoth. The player character and Drevin are ordered to capture a temple held by dryads. After the temple is captured, however, Valdis attacks the mercenaries. Drevin is killed, and the player character is knocked unconscious.

The player character regains consciousness in the custody of the dryads. Rather than execute them, the dryads allow the player to earn their freedom by helping them in the war against Valdis. After the protagonist earns freedom, they discover that they are infected with the Plague, a mysterious disease created by the Dark Wizards that drives its victims to insanity. After being cured by the water from an Elven shrine, they return to their hometown.

On the way home, the player character rescues an old man from Plague-maddened dryads. The old man describes an event called the Great Cataclysm, caused when the Sword of Zaramoth that Valdis wields struck a magical shield called the Shield of Azunai. The blow shattered the shield, causing a catastrophe that ended the First Age. Valdis hopes to cause another such catastrophe by gathering the shards of the Shield of Azunai so he can shatter it again. The old man explains the Plague, saying that it is caused by crystals created during the Great Cataclysm that give license to the souls of Zaramoth's army to possess the living.

After the player character returns home, they begin to gather the pieces of the shield to use it against Valdis. After they gather all of the pieces, they take them to the Agallan giants so that they can re-forge the shield. As they re-forge it, they place a medallion in the center of it for added durability. This medallion had previously been worn by Drevin; he gave it to the player character before he died.

With the shield re-forged, the player character travels to Valdis' stronghold known as Zaramoth's Horns. The shield protects them from the Dark Wizards, but the battle with Valdis himself proves to be a stalemate until the old man appears and takes the shield from the player character. He gives the shield to Valdis, revealing that he is a Dark Wizard. Valdis tries to destroy the shield with the Sword of Zaramoth, but when he strikes the shield, his sword shatters instead. Valdis and the player character resume the battle, in which Valdis is killed.

== Development ==
The game was developed in almost three years.

== Release ==
=== Broken World ===
2K Games released Dungeon Siege II: Broken World in 2006. The expansion pack introduces several features, including an additional act (campaign), two hybrid classes based on existing classes, Dwarves as a playable race, enchantment-based "recipes", two pets purchasable at the act's main town, including the Pack Ram and Kohl Beast, and the PlayStation Portable crossover items to promote and to be used in conjunction with Dungeon Siege: Throne of Agony.

=== Deluxe Edition ===
Dungeon Siege II: Deluxe Edition is a special collector's set that includes the original Dungeon Siege II, Broken World expansion pack, and a number of collectible items spanning maps, portraits, wallpapers and a "The Making of Dungeon Siege II" video file on CD-ROM. It was released on October 23, 2006.

== Reception ==
Reception

Aggregate score
Aggregator	Score
Metacritic	80/100

Review scores
Publication	Score
Computer Games Magazine	3.5/5
Computer Gaming World	3.5/5
Eurogamer	8/10
Game Informer	8/10
GamePro	4.5/5
GameRevolution	C+
GameSpot	7.9/10
GameSpy	4/5
GameTrailers	8.7/10
GameZone	8.3/10
IGN	8.5/10
PC Gamer (US)	87%
RPGamer	3/5
RPGFan	86%
Detroit Free Press	4/4
The Times	4/5

The game received "favorable" reviews according to the review aggregation website Metacritic.

GameSpot said, "Dungeon Siege II is a solid effort that manages to improve on the first game to deliver a lengthy, combat-heavy dungeon hack that will certainly please fans of the genre."

Detroit Free Press gave the game all four stars, saying, "It's a winning combination: the same great concept that made Dungeon Siege a hit now with new story lines, new features and improved graphics. It's a great choice for dozens of hours of gameplay this fall." The Times gave it four stars out of five, calling it "a handsome game with a stirring soundtrack, with the potential to deliver weeks of very involving gameplay for hardcore followers." However, The Sydney Morning Herald gave it three-and-a-half stars out of five, saying, "Fast-paced, epic and accessible, Microsoft's hack'n'slash sequel will entertain role-playing novices but disappoint veterans looking for more depth and innovation."

The game won PC Gamer US' "Best Roleplaying Game 2005" award. Greg Vederman called it "that rare sequel that rises above its predecessor in just about every way." During the 9th Annual Interactive Achievement Awards, the Academy of Interactive Arts & Sciences nominated Dungeon Siege II for "Role-Playing Game of the Year", which was ultimately awarded to Jade Empire.
