= Wargaming Seattle =

American video game developer

- Formerly: Gas Powered Games (1998–2013)
- Type: Subsidiary
- Industry: Video games
- Founded: May 1998
- Founders: Chris Taylor; Jake McMahon; Bartosz Kijanka; Mike Biddlecombe; Rick Saenz
- Defunct: July 22, 2018
- Fate: Dissolved
- Headquarters: Redmond, Washington, United States
- Key people: Chris Taylor (1998–2016)
- Products: Dungeon Siege; Supreme Commander; Demigod
- Number of employees: 150 (2018)
- Parent: Wargaming (2013–2018)

Wargaming Seattle, formerly known as Gas Powered Games, was a video game developer located in Redmond, Washington. The development studio was started in May 1998 by Chris Taylor and several other ex-Cavedog Entertainment employees. In 2013 they became the Seattle studio of Wargaming. Wargaming Seattle was closed down in July 2018.

== History ==
Gas Powered Games was formed in May 1998 by Chris Taylor, alongside Jake McMahon, Bartosz Kijanka, Mike Biddlecombe, and Rick Saenz. Their launch title was the 2002 3D role-playing video game Dungeon Siege, published by Microsoft Game Studios. Apart from its custom graphics engine, it also featured simple and innovative role-playing rules and mechanics that made it stand out from a market already crowded with sword and sorcery/fantasy role-playing games.

In 2003 Gas Powered released a stand-alone expansion pack for the game, Dungeon Siege: Legends of Aranna. The expansion was co-developed by Mad Doc Software and again published by Microsoft Game Studios. In August 2005, Gas Powered released its sequel to Dungeon Siege, Dungeon Siege II. In March 2006, Take-Two Interactive purchased the full publishing rights of the Dungeon Siege series, ending the four-year Microsoft partnership with Gas Powered Games. GPG released Supreme Commander, a real-time strategy game in February 2007, published by THQ. Announced in the August 2005 issue of PC Gamer magazine, Chris Taylor touted Supreme Commander as the spiritual successor to Total Annihilation as Total Annihilation remains the intellectual property of Atari. As a stand-alone expansion, Supreme Commander: Forged Alliance was announced in June 2007, for a November release.

In May 2007, Gas Powered Games announced a partnership with Sega to work on an original role-playing game. On July 6, 2007, the game was announced as Space Siege. The game was released on August 12, 2008 to generally middling reviews. In January 2008, Gas Powered Games announced a new project, Demigod, to be released sometime in early 2009. It is an action role-playing and real-time strategy video game, a hybrid inspired by the Warcraft III mod Defense of the Ancients. Demigod was released on 14 April 2009 in the U.S. On November 12, 2008, Square Enix announced that it would be partnering with Gas Powered Games to create Supreme Commander 2. The game was released in March 2010 for the PC and Xbox 360, with a version for Mac OS X following in September 2010.

On February 24, 2011, it was announced that Gas Powered Games would be taking over development on the upcoming real-time strategy game Age of Empires Online, replacing Robot Entertainment on the project. Gas Powered Games announced plans to create a real-time strategy game named Chris Taylor's Kings and Castles, which would use the game engine from Supreme Commander 2, however it never released and was cancelled by the studio's shutdown in 2018. On January 4, 2013, it was noted in an Age of Empires Online blog post that Gas Powered Games would no longer be supporting the game. Approximately two weeks prior to this announcement, Gas Powered Games put up a teaser web site announcement for a 'Project W'

On January 14, 2013, Gas Powered Games announced the Kickstarter project "Wildman", declared to be "an 'evolutionary' action role-playing game". Four days later on January 18, Gas Powered Games had to lay off roughly 40 employees, with the ultimate fate of the company riding on the Kickstarter campaign. On Feb 11, 2013, Gas Powered Games canceled their Kickstarter project "Wildman", four days before it was due to finish, announcing that they wanted to "focus [their] attention on other ways to keep Gas Powered Games running"

=== Acquisition ===
Three days after the cancelation of the "Wildman" project, Wargaming announced that they were in talks to buy Gas Powered Games. The company was acquired in February 2013. Gas Powered Games was absorbed into Wargaming to become Wargaming Seattle, which ended Gas Powered Games as an independent studio.

=== Dissolution ===
On May 23, 2018, Victor Kislyi, the head of Wargaming, announced to the studio that it would be closed down, laying off roughly 150 developers. The studio was officially closed on July 22.

== GPGnet ==
GPGnet was an online gaming service run by the company. It was used with Supreme Commander, Supreme Commander: Forged Alliance, Dungeon Siege, Dungeon Siege II, and Space Siege.

== Games ==
| Title | Year | Platform |
|---|---|---|
| Dungeon Siege | 2002 | Windows, Mac |
| Dungeon Siege: Legends of Aranna | 2003 | Windows |
| Dungeon Siege II | 2005 | Windows |
| Dungeon Siege II: Broken World | 2006 | Windows |
| Supreme Commander | 2007 | Windows, Xbox 360 |
| Supreme Commander: Forged Alliance | 2007 | Windows |
| Space Siege | 2008 | Windows |
| Demigod | 2009 | Windows |
| Supreme Commander 2 | 2010 | Windows, Mac, Xbox 360 |
| Age of Empires Online | 2011 | Windows |
| Kings and Castles | Cancelled | |
| Wildman | Cancelled | PC |
