= Digic Pictures =

Hungarian animation studio

- Company type: Subsidiary
- Genre: Game cinematics; VFX productions
- Founded: 2001; 25 years ago
- Founder: Andrew G. Vajna; Sándor Rabb
- Headquarters: Budapest, Hungary
- Products: Game cinematics; VFX; Commercials
- Services: Production of 3D animated intro movies; Trailers for video games
- Number of employees: 400+
- Parent: Cinergi Interactive (2003–2007); Saber Interactive (2021–present)
- Website: www.digicpictures.com

DIGIC Pictures is a Hungarian 3D animation studio based in Budapest, specializing in the production of 3D animated game cinematics CGI. Digic also provides motion capture services at its own studio, Digic Motion. The company produces 3D animated shorts and visual effects in association with video games, feature films or commercial advertisements.

== History ==
DIGIC Pictures was founded in December 2001 by Alex S. Rabb, originally creating trailers and promotional teasers for video games, as part of video game developer Black Hole Entertainment. Digic Pictures, as the cinematic department of Black Hole, produced animation sequences for RTS games developed by Black Hole. In 2002, Digic produced five 3D cinematics – Intro, Outro, Human, Beast, Fallen – for the EA game called Armies of Exigo that was completed in 2003. With Andrew G. Vajna, the studio became involved in the production of 60 VFX scenes of the American film Terminator 3: Rise of the Machines.

Since 2006, Digic Pictures has worked with video game developers while also producing animated shorts for gamer audiences, including intros, outros, trailers and teasers for Warhammer, Darksiders, Assassin's Creed, and Mass Effect episodes. The Assassin's Creed Unity trailer was introduced at E3 in 2014. In November 2014, Digic made a cinematic for Call of Duty: Advanced Warfare. In 2015, the Assassin's Creed Unity: Dead Kings, and Assassin's Creed Syndicate cinematic trailer were released. Also in 2015, the Witcher 3: Wild Hunt cinematic trailer was published.

In 2016, Digic produced content for Destiny: The Taken King, Kingsglaive: Final Fantasy XV, and the Final Fantasy XV – Omen trailer. In 2017, DIGIC Pictures made CG trailers for League of Legends: Warwick The Wrath of Zaun, Lineage M, Gwent: The Witcher Card Game, and Assassin's Creed Origins. Besides CG trailers, Digic also created in-game CG cinematics for Destiny 2.

In December 2021 DIGIC was acquired by Embracer Group through its subsidiary Saber Interactive. In March 2024, Saber was sold to Beacon Interactive, a new company from Saber co-founder Matthew Karch. Many of Saber's studios, including DIGIC, were included in the sale.

== Game cinematics ==
#	Film	Release date	Publisher	Developer	Genre	Awards & Screenings
1	Armies of Exigo	January 15, 2003	Electronic Arts	Black Hole Entertainment	Intro	Listed for screening at Siggraph 2003 Electronic Theater, San Diego, USA
2	Armies of Exigo	July 1, 2004	Electronic Arts	Black Hole Entertainment	Outro	
3	Armies of Exigo Human	July 1, 2004	Electronic Arts	Black Hole Entertainment	Short	
4	Armies of Exigo Beast	July 1, 2004	Electronic Arts	Black Hole Entertainment	Short	
5	Armies of Exigo Fallen	July 1, 2004	Electronic Arts	Black Hole Entertainment	Short	
6	Warhammer: Mark of Chaos	May 18, 2005	Namco Bandai	Black Hole Entertainment	Teaser	
7	Warhammer: Mark of Chaos	May 30, 2006	Namco Bandai	Black Hole Entertainment	Intro	Listed for screening at Siggraph 2006 Electronic Theater, Boston, USA Gametrailers.com Top 100 Trailers of All Time No. 64.
8	Universe at War Earth Assault	August 21, 2007	Sega of America	Petroglyph	Trailer	
9	Warhammer: Battle March	August 30, 2007	Namco Bandai	Black Hole Entertainment	Intro	
10	Infiniti	October 10, 2007	Pai International		Short	
11	The Secret World series Puritan	December 2, 2007	Funcom	Funcom	Short	
12	The Secret World series Firestarter	February 10, 2008	Funcom	Funcom	Short	
13	The Secret World series Grifter	March 25, 2008	Funcom	Funcom	Short	Gametrailers.com Top 100 Trailers of All Time No. 78.
14	The Secret World series Zuberi	April 20, 2008	Funcom	Funcom	Short	
15	Aliens: Colonial Marines	May 13, 2008	Sega	Gearbox Software	Teaser	
16	Darksiders: Wrath of War	December 21, 2008	THQ	Vigil Games	Intro	
17	Darksiders: Wrath of War	June 23, 2009	THQ	Vigil Games	Trailer	
18	Alpha Protocol	April 15, 2009	Sega	Obsidian	Trailer	
19	Assassin's Creed II	June 2, 2009	Ubisoft	Ubisoft Montreal	Trailer	Best Technical Prize at Siggraph Asia 2009, Yokohama, Japan Best Post-Production Award at Animago Award 2009, Berlin, Germany Most viewed trailer in June 2009 by Gametrailers.com Listed for screening at Siggraph Asia 2009 Electronic Theater, Yokohama, Japan Listed for screening at Siggraph 2010 Electronic Theater, Los Angeles, USA Top 100 Trailers of All Time No. 03.
20	Prince of Persia: The Forgotten Sands	May 26, 2010	Ubisoft	Ubisoft Montreal	Intro	Listed for screening at Siggraph 2010 CAF, Los Angeles, USA
21	Assassin's Creed Brotherhood	June 14, 2010	Ubisoft	Ubisoft Montreal	Trailer	Listed for screening at Siggraph Asia 2010 Electronic Theater, Seoul, South Korea Listed for screening at Siggraph 2011 CAF, Vancouver, Canada Gametrailers.com Top 100 Trailers of All Time No. 81.
22	Civilization V	September 21, 2010	2K Games	Firaxis Games	Intro	Animated Com Award’s Technology Prize at 18. International Trickfilm Festival of Animated Film 2011, Stuttgart, Germany Best Technical Prize at Siggraph Asia 2010, Seoul, South Korea Best Post-Production Award at Animago Award 2010, Berlin, Germany Listed for screening at Siggraph Asia 2010 Electronic Theater, Seoul, South Korea Listed for screening at Siggraph 2011 CAF, Vancouver, Canada
23	Dragon age 2	August 17, 2010	Electronic Arts	Bioware	Trailer	Nominated for Animago 2011 Best Post-production Award, Berlin, Germany Listed for screening at Siggraph Asia 2011 Electronic Theater, Hong Kong, China Listed for screening at Siggraph 2011 CAF, Vancouver, Canada
24	Mass Effect 3	December 11, 2010	Electronic Arts	Bioware	Teaser	Most viewed trailer in December 2010 by Gametrailers.com Top User Rated Gametrailer of All Time 2011 by Gametrailers.com Listed for screening at Siggraph 2011 CAF, Vancouver
25	Assassin's Creed Revelations	June 6, 2011	Ubisoft	Ubisoft Montreal	Trailer	SPIKE Video Game Awards: Trailer of the Year 2011 Best Post-Production Award at Animago Award 2011, Berlin, Germany GameSpot: Editor’s Choice - Best Trailer of E3 2011 GameSpot: Reader’s Choice - Best Trailer of E3 2011 Gametrailers.com - Best Trailer of E3 2011 1Up - Best Trailer of E3 2011 Listed for screening at Siggraph Asia 2011 Electronic Theater, Hong Kong, China Top 100 Trailers of All Time - Gametrailers.com No. 29.
26	Mass Effect 3 - Take Earth Back	February 19, 2012	Electronic Arts	Bioware	Trailer	Best Post-Production Award at Animago Awards 2012, Berlin, Germany Animated Com Award’s Technology Prize at 20. International Trickfilm Festival of Animated Film, 2013, Stuttgart, Germany
27	Assassin's Creed III	June 4, 2012	Ubisoft	Ubisoft Montreal	Trailer	G4Tv Best Trailer of E3, 2012 Gametrailers.com nomination for Best Trailer of E3, 2012 Listed for screening at Siggraph Asia 2013 Animation Theater, Hong Kong, China Listed for screening at Siggraph 2013 CAF, Anaheim, USA
28	Castlevania: Lords of Shadow 2	June 4, 2012	KONAMI	Mercury Steam	Trailer	Listed for screening at Siggraph Asia 2013 Animation Theater, Hong Kong, China Listed for screening at Siggraph 2013 CAF, Anaheim, USA
29	Splinter Cell Blacklist	June 4, 2012	Ubisoft	Ubisoft Toronto	Trailer	
30	HALO 4 Prologue	November 5, 2012	Microsoft Studios	343 Industries	Intro cinematic	Nominated for Animago 2013 Best Trailer/Opener Award, Berlin, Germany Listed for screening at Siggraph Asia 2013 Electronic Theater, Hong Kong, China Listed for screening at Siggraph 2013 CAF, Anaheim, USA
31	HALO 4 Infinity	November 5, 2012	Microsoft Studios	343 Industries	Cut-scene cinematic	
32	HALO 4 Epilogue	November 5, 2012	Microsoft Studios	343 Industries	Cut-scene cinematic	
33	HALO 4 Ending	November 5, 2012	Microsoft Studios	343 Industries	Outro cinematic	
34	Assassin's Creed 4 Black Flag announcement trailer	March 4, 2013	Ubisoft	Ubisoft Montreal	Trailer	Nominated for Animago 2013 Best Trailer/Opener Award, Berlin, Germany Listed for screening at Siggraph Asia 2013 Animation Theater, Hong Kong, China
35	Watch Dogs "Exposed" E3	June 10, 2013	Ubisoft	Ubisoft Montreal	Trailer	Best Trailer/Opener Award at Animago Awards 2013, Berlin, Germany Animated Com Award’s Technology Prize at 21. International Trickfilm Festival of Animated Film, 2014, Stuttgart, Germany Listed for screening at Siggraph Asia 2013 Electronic Theater, Hong Kong, China
36	Assassin's Creed 4 Black Flag E3 trailer	June 10, 2013	Ubisoft	Ubisoft Montreal	Trailer	Nominated for Animago 2013 Best Trailer/Opener Award, Berlin, Germany Listed for screening at Siggraph Asia 2013 Animation Theater, Hong Kong, China
37	Assassin's Creed Unity E3 trailer	June 9, 2014	Ubisoft	Ubisoft Montreal	Trailer	Best Trailer/Opener Award at Animago 2014 Animation Festival, Berlin, Germany Listed for screening at Siggraph Asia 2014 Electronic Theatre, Shenzhen, China Special mention for "Excellence in Cinematics" at Spark Animation Festival, 2014 Vancouver, Canada Gold prize for “ Outstanding Promotional Trailer “ and “ Best Use of Music in a Promotional Piece “ and Silver prize for “ Best CG for a Video Asset ” at GMA 2015, San Francisco, USA
38	Assassin's Creed Unity: Arno Master Assassin	July 29, 2014	Ubisoft	Ubisoft	Trailer	Has debuted at the 2014 San Diego Comic-Con
39	Call of Duty: Advanced Warfare	November 4, 2014	Activision Publishing	Sledgehammer Games	Cut-scene cinematic	
40	Assassin's Creed Unity: Dead Kings	January 29, 2015	Ubisoft	Ubisoft	Trailer	
41	The Witcher 3: Wild Hunt Launch Cinematic	May 15, 2015	CD Projekt S.A	CD Projekt S.A	Trailer	Best Trailer/Opener Award at Animago 2015 Animation Festival, Berlin, Germany Listed for screening at Siggraph Asia 2015 Electronic Theater, Kobe, Japan Best Cinermatic award at Spark Animation Festival 2015, Vancouver, Canada
42	Assassin's Creed Syndicate Cinematic Trailer	June 15, 2015	Ubisoft	Ubisoft Quebec	Trailer	Nomination for Best Trailer/Opener Award at Animago 2015 Animation Festival, Berlin, Germany
43	Destiny: The Taken King CG Cinematics	February, 2016	Activision	Bungie	Trailer	
44	Kingsglaive: Final Fantasy XV - Battle Scene	August, 2016	Sony Pictures Home Entertainment	Square Enix	Feature film scenes	
45	Final Fantasy XV - Omen Trailer	October, 2016	Square Enix	Square Enix	Trailer	Nomination for Best Technical Prize at Siggraph Asia 2016, Macao, China
46	League of Legends - Warwick: The Wrath of Zaun	January 9, 2017	Riot Games	Riot Games	Trailer	
47	Lineage M	May 15, 2017	NCsoft	NCsoft	Trailer	
48	Gwent: The Witcher Card Game	May 25, 2017	CD Projekt Red	CD Projekt Red	Trailer	
49	Assassin's Creed Origins: Gamescom 2017 Cinematic Trailer	Aug 20, 2017	Ubisoft	Ubisoft	Trailer	
50	Call of Duty: WWII	Nov 3, 2017	Activision	Sledgehammer Games	Cinematics	
51	Destiny 2	Sept 6, 2017	Bungie	Bungie	in-game CG cinematics	
52	League of Legends: The Climb	Jan 15, 2018	Riot Games	Riot Games	Trailer	
53	Destiny 2: Forsaken	Sept 28, 2018	Bungie	Bungie	Cinematic Trailer	
54	Lost Ark	Nov 7, 2018	Smilegate	Smilegate	Trailer	
55	Awaken (ft. Valerie Broussard) | League of Legends Cinematic - Season 2019	Jan 21, 2019	Riot Games	Riot Games	Trailer	
56	The Secret War( Love, Death and Robots )	March 15, 2019	Netflix	Blur	Anthology	
56	Rainbow Six Siege: The Hammer and the Scalpel	Feb 16, 2019	Ubisoft	Ubisoft	Trailer	
57	Sniper Ghost Warrior Contracts Teaser Trailer	June 7, 2019	CI Games		Teaser Trailer	
58	Darksiders Genesis - Announcement Teaser	Jun 7, 2019	THQ Nordic		Teaser	
59	Warframe intro movie	July 6, 2019	Digital Extremes		CGI Intro Movie Trailer	
60	Assassin's Creed Valhalla Trailer	April 30, 2020	Ubisoft		CGI Intro Movie Trailer	
61	Ruination | Season 2021 Cinematic - League of Legends	January 8, 2021	Riot Games	Riot Games	Trailer	
62	Elden Ring	February 25, 2022	FROMSOFTWARE	Bandai Namco	Cinematic Trailer	

== VFX & commercials ==
#	Film	Release date	Client	Genre	Awards & Screenings
1	Terminator 3: Rise of The Machines	May 1, 2003	C2 Pictures, IMF	Visual effects	
2	Children of Glory	October 23, 2006	C2 Pictures, Flashback Productions	Visual effects	
3	ESET for Android	November 5, 2007	MARK BBDO	Commercial	
4	Assassin's Creed III	October 19, 2012	Ubisoft	Commercial	
5	AMD "Be Invincible"	June 10, 2013	Advanced Micro Devices	Commercial	Nominated for Animago 2013 Best Postproduction Award, Berlin, Germany Listed for screening at Siggraph Asia 2013 Animation Theater, Hong Kong, China
6	Assassin's Creed IV Black Flag Tattoo TV Spot	October 6, 2013	Ubisoft/Mistress Creative	Commercial	
7	Watch Dogs TV Commercial	May 5, 2014	Ubisoft	Commercial	Gold prize for “ Best CG for a Video Asset ” and Silver prize for “Outstanding TV or Theatrical AD ” at GMA 2015 San Francisco, USA
8	The Witcher 3: Wild Hunt TV Spot	April, 2015	CD Projekt S.A	Commercial	
9	Assassin's Creed Syndicate TV Spot Trailer (US)	November, 2015	Ubisoft	Commercial	
10	Assassin's Creed Syndicate TV Spot Trailer (Europe)	February, 2016	Ubisoft/Iconoclast	Commercial	
11	Uncharted 4: A Thief's End - Man Behind The Treasure TV Spot	March, 2016	Sony Computer Entertainment America LLC./Naughty Dog, Inc.	Commercial	
12	Uncharted 4: The Thief's End - Heads or Trails TV Spot	March, 2016	Sony Computer Entertainment America LLC./Naughty Dog, Inc.	Commercial	
