= Fig (company) =

Crowdfunding platform for video games

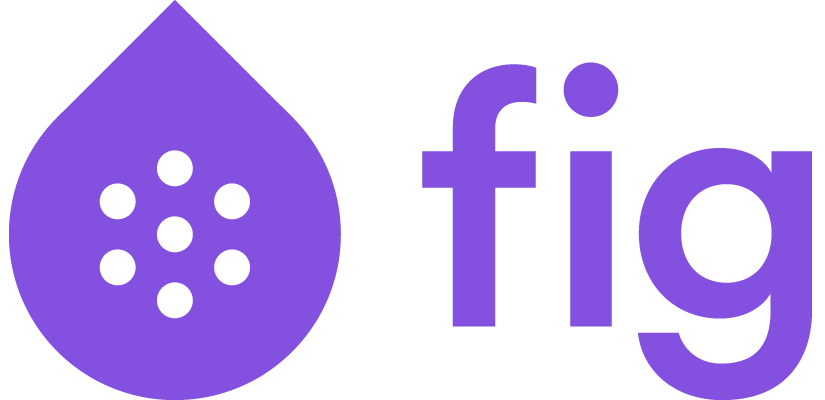
- Website type: Crowdfunding
- Dissolved: May 29, 2023; 3 years ago
- Headquarters: San Francisco, California, U.S.
- Founders: Justin Bailey; Bob Ippolito; Freeman White
- Key people: Aaron Isaksen; Brian Fargo; Feargus Urquhart; Tim Schafer; Alex Rigopulos; Cliff Bleszinski; Randy Pitchford
- Parent: Republic
- Website: republic.com/fig
- Launched: August 18, 2015; 11 years ago
- Current status: Liquidated into Republic

Fig was a crowdfunding platform for video games. It launched in August 2015. Unlike traditional crowdfunding approaches like Kickstarter, where individuals can back a project to receive rewards, Fig used a mixed model that included individual backing and the opportunity for uncredited investors to invest as to obtain a share of future revenues for successful projects. At the end of 2017 four projects had begun generating returns, returning 245% to Fig investors.

Fig was acquired by Republic in 2022, and later liquidated into the parent company in May 2023.

== History ==
Fig was founded in August 2015 by Justin Bailey (formerly, COO of Double Fine Productions), Bob Ippolito, and Freeman White. The advisory board was composed of executives from across the video game industry with previous experience in crowdfunding and investing in video game projects: Aaron Isaksen of the Indie Fund, Brian Fargo of inXile Entertainment, Feargus Urquhart of Obsidian Entertainment, and Tim Schafer of Double Fine Productions. The platform is backed by funding from Spark Capital. Alex Rigopulos, from Harmonix, and Cliff Bleszinski, formerly of Epic Games and Boss Key Productions, and Randy Pitchford of Gearbox Software have since joined the advisory board of Fig.

The company was initially backed by seed funding from Spark Capital. In January 2017, it obtained another $7.84 million in funding from Spark and Greycroft Partners, among other smaller investors.

In February 2017, Fig announced it had established a "Fig Finishing Fund" available to those projects that have been successfully backed on Fig as to help complete any late-stage development hurdles or final publishing and marketing pushes. Should projects qualify, they would have been able to obtain $20,000 from the Finishing Fund.

In 2017, Fig set aside $500,000 of its own funds available for the Finishing Fund pool.

The name "Fig" derived from Hotel Figueroa, located along Figueroa Street, a short distance from the Los Angeles Convention Center where the annual Electronic Entertainment Expo is traditionally held; Hotel Figueroa became a common social hub during these E3 events.

Fig was acquired by Republic, a larger crowdfunding investment company, in April 2020. Fig initially continued to operate under Republic, though there would be opportunities to access more investors for projects through Republic's investment capital. This allowed Fig to open up to more expansive campaigns including those related to hardware; with the announcement of the Republic acquisition, for example, Fig launched the campaign to allow crowdfunding or investment into the Intellivision Amico microconsole. After acquisition, Justin Bailey remained as a board member at Republic to help the post-merger integration.

Republic said it had intended to close Fig after they acquired the company, which came about on May 28, 2023. Republic intended to uphold Fig's existing obligations for rewards and similar benefits to backers after this date.

== Approach ==
Fig was offered as an alternative means for funding video game development from traditional crowdfunding sites like Kickstarter. The goal of Fig was to allow not only the traditional backing of a video game as with normal crowdfunding, but to also enable those that can invest in a game's development to receive a portion of the game's profits once it is released, in addition to other typical rewards that crowdfunded projects allow. During their initial growth period, Fig limited investors in such projects to those that had accredited assets of over $1 million, with plans that once off the ground, anyone would be able to contribute and invest in their offered projects.

Due to the Jumpstart Our Business Startups Act which changed how the Security and Exchange Commission (SEC) treated crowdfunding, Fig allowed anyone to invest at a minimum of $1,000 into future campaigns starting in December 2015. There were initially some issues with gaining SEC approval to collect funds from unaccredited investors, holding up the funding for some of the campaigns after this point such as Psychonauts 2, and Fig had been supplying the requested funds to developers through internal support and investment. In September 2016, the SEC approved Fig's plan allowing unaccredited investors to purchase Fig Game Shares once campaigns had succeeded. While further campaigns required SEC review for unaccredited investors, work for establishing the mechanism for the Psychonauts 2 campaign by Fig and its legal firm was expected to streamline these subsequent reviews. Fig had adapted a plan to account for unaccredited investors that may have opted not to provide the funding during the course of a SEC review; Fig still intended to provide the full amount of money committed at the time of the campaign to the developers, holding any unpaid unaccredited share for sale that others could subsequently purchase as to maintain the percentages of equity between accredited and unaccredited shareholders.

The concept for allowing investments of this nature resulted from the advisory board members' previous experience with Kickstarter campaigns, in which those that backed at the largest amounts typically were the least disruptive of the development process as they likely had the most trust in the game developer to complete the title as offered, according to Bailey. They also took inspiration from the success of Oculus VR, the company formed to develop their Oculus Rift virtual reality hardware through a $2.5 million Kickstarter campaign and eventually was sold to Facebook for $2 billion. Bailey believed that the most invested fans of such projects should be able to have a portion of those profits for a highly successful title.

Because Fig used both traditional backing as well as investment support, potential investors were able to judge a project's viability based on how many backers the project accrued, which could help derisk their investment. According to Schafer, he hoped that this would create a reputation for games that would fall somewhere between AAA titles and indie games, allowing for smaller teams to develop games with larger budgets (on the order of millions of dollars) that normally required large publication deals. Schafer also felt that with average crowd-funding projects typically seeking funds via Kickstarter, there was a growing fatigue in the area, where only certain niche projects, such as Exploding Kittens, gained attention, and considered Fig a means to counter that fatigue for games that did not fit those niches.

Fig's approach was designed to support only one or two campaigns at a time, in contrast to the volume that are offered by Kickstarter or other crowdfunding services. Projects were curated by Fig for viability and interest before they were supported, and allowed them to customize the website's project page for the game title to enhance its appeal. Fig may have expanded to have more concurrent projects if the platform proved successful. Fig did not require projects to accept investment support as long they offered typical backing options. As part of their support, Fargo, Urquhart, and Schafer said that all future games developed by their respective studios would use Fig-based funding.

Fig created a secondary monetization approach "Open Access" in May 2019 that was based on the early access release approach. After a game's initial funding was complete users were still able to contribute to the game's funding under this Open Access period, running from as short as 30 days after the initial Fig investment period up to as late as the game's full release, gaining access to early builds of the game and other backer features.

== Games funded ==
Title	Developer	Period	Funding sought	Completed funding (completed investment)	Number of backers	Status	Description
Intellivision Amico	Amico Entertainment	2019–"ongoing"		$5.5 million		Failure	A poorly managed vanity project and vaporware. The Amico went through multiple rounds of funding, sank Fig, and has thus far failed to produce anything of note or value.
Outer Wilds	Mobius Digital	August 18, 2015 – September 17, 2015	$125,000	$126,480 ($75,000)	968	Success	The first game to be funded on Fig. Developed by Masi Oka's studio Mobius Digital. The campaign sought $125,000 of total funding with $50,000 of that being from investors, but within the first few days of its launch, it was oversubscribed. Mobius increased the offering to $75,000, but still had to turn away nearly $800,000 of potential investment. Fig investors sold their interest in the game to Annapurna Interactive before the game was released, earning a 220% return.
Anchors in the Drift	5th Cell	October 21, 2015 – November 20, 2015	$500,000	$107,233 ($101,000)	133	Failure	5th Cell had committed to using Fig for their next project, Anchors in the Drift, a free-to-play role-playing game; 5th Cell was seeking $500,000 in investment and funding to finish off the game. The funding drive failed to meet its goal, only obtaining just above $100,000 of funding. Bailey stated that while they had anticipated a larger response based on the success of the Outer Wilds campaign, the failure demonstrates the nature of the crowdfunding where developers have a better gauge of player interest based on the success or failures of such campaigns.
Psychonauts 2	Double Fine Productions	December 3, 2015 – January 12, 2016	$3,300,000	$3,829,024 ($1,870,000)	24,109	Success	In December 2015, Schafer announced Psychonauts 2, the sequel to Double Fine's Psychonauts, would be the next game to be funded through Fig, with a goal of $3.3 million of funding and investment. The campaign successfully completed with over $3.8 million raised from over 24,000 backers, with nearly half coming from investment-type funding as opposed to traditional reward-based backers.
Jay and Silent Bob: Chronic Blunt Punch	Interabang Entertainment	February 23, 2016 – March 31, 2016	$400,000	$445,467 ($327,000)	2,600	Success	Funding for Interabang's Jay and Silent Bob: Chronic Blunt Punch, a Castle Crashers-style brawler game based on the characters created by Kevin Smith, was announced in February 2016. The developers sought $400k in funding for the title. The campaign was successfully funded with over $435,000 from backers. The game then went a period of several years without updates which included the acquisition and closing of Fig by Republic, until the game was revived and announced for release in 2025.
Rock Band 4 for PC	Harmonix Music Systems, Inc.	March 1, 2016 – April 5, 2016	$1,500,000	$792,817 ($591,000)	1,674	Failure	On Alex Rigopolis's joining of Fig's advisory board, he stated that he planned to use Fig to finance a future Harmonix product. Harmonix launched a campaign on Fig in March 2016 to port Rock Band 4 to the personal computer, seeking $1.5 million in funding to complete the port. The campaign only met about 50% of its funding goal, though Harmonix did not rule out other means to bring Rock Band 4 to the PC.
Consortium: The Tower	Interdimensional Games Inc	April 7, 2016 – May 11, 2016	$300,000	$348,538 ($249,000)	3,046	Success	Interdimensional Games used Fig to fund a sequel to Consortium, entitled Consortium: The Tower. Interdimensional Games had first tried to fund the project through Kickstarter in early 2016, but only raised about CAD $182,000 of the $450,000 they targeted. The developers saw that the Kickstarter would likely fail early on, and starting planning on using Fig as a backup plan. The Fig campaign launched in April 2016, seeking to raise US$300,000 (about the same as the Kickstarter), and has surpassed this amount.
Make Sail	Popcannibal	September 29, 2016 – November 2, 2016	$50,000	$58,990 ($32,000)	911	Success	Make Sail is a survival game set aboard a primarily ocean world, allowing the player to craft and improve a seaworthy vessel to explore the world. The game is being developed by Popcannibal, who previously created Girls Like Robots and Elegy for a Dead World. The Fig campaign sought $50,000 in funding.
Wasteland 3	inXile Entertainment	October 5, 2016 – November 3, 2016	$2,750,000	$3,121,716 ($2,250,000)	17,707	Success	inXile Entertainment will use Fig to launch crowdfunding for Wasteland 3, the sequel to its 2014 Wasteland 2. The campaign, to start in October 2016, seeks $2.75 million in funding and investment, an amount comparable to what Wasteland 2 had obtained through Kickstarter.
Trackless	12 East Games LLC	October 11, 2016 – November 17, 2016	$20,000	$21,790 ($12,000)	465	Success	Released on September 12, 2017. Generated a 12% return as of December 31, 2017.
Jazon and the Dead	2nd Studio	October 31, 2016 – December 1, 2016	$65,000	$30,250 ($18,000)	319	Failure	
Kingdoms and Castles	Lion Shield	December 3, 2016 – January 5, 2017	$15,000	$108,767 ($83,000)	1,382	Success	First game to generate a positive return for Fig investors. Generated a 300% return.
Little Bug	Buddy System	January 4, 2017 – February 9, 2017	$35,000	$35,317 ($28,000)	315	Success	
Solo	Team Gotham	January 18, 2017 – February 23, 2017	$64,500	$68,735 ($50,000)	543	Success	
Pillars of Eternity II: Deadfire	Obsidian Entertainment	January 25, 2017 – February 24, 2017	$1,100,000	$4,705,524 ($2,250,000)	33,614	Success	
Solstice Chronicles: MIA	Ironward	February 23, 2017 – March 23, 2017	$30,000	$30,900 ($16,000)	512	Success	Released July 26, 2017. Generated a 104% return as of December 31, 2017.
Phoenix Point	Snapshot Games	April 25, 2017 – June 8, 2017	$500,000	$765,948 ($320,000)	10,314	Success	Phoenix Point is a single-player, strategy, turn-based tactics, "sci-fi horror" video game being developed by Snapshot Games, an independent video game developer in Sofia, Bulgaria. The creative lead for the game, Julian Gollop, is known as the "man who gave birth to the X-COM franchise." Phoenix Point is described as a spiritual successor to X-COM.
Flash Point: Fire Rescue	RetroEpic Software	May 30, 2017 – June 28, 2017	$30,000	$38,354 ($15,000)	767	Success	
KnightOut	2nd Studio	June 27, 2017 – July 27, 2017	$15,000	$30,713 ($25,000)	323	Success	
Bounty Battle	Dark Screen Games	Jul. 2017 – August 22, 2017	$30,000	$39,575 ($26,000)	334	Success	
Homeworld 3	Blackbird Interactive	September 1, 2019 – September 30, 2019	$1	Ongoing ($1,505,840)	8,414	Success	
