= Cavedog Entertainment =

Defunct video game company

- Company type: Division
- Industry: Video games
- Founded: 1995; 30 years ago
- Founders: Shelley Day; Ron Gilbert
- Defunct: February 11, 2000; 25 years ago
- Fate: Dissolved
- Headquarters: Bothell, Washington, US
- Key people: Ron Gilbert (creative director); Chris Taylor (TA's creator)
- Products: Total Annihilation series Total Annihilation: Kingdoms series
- Number of employees: ≈20 (1997)
- Parent: Humongous Entertainment

Cavedog Entertainment was a PC game developer and publisher based in Bothell, Washington. Founded in 1995 as a division of edutainment game developer Humongous Entertainment, Cavedog was known for the 1997 release of Total Annihilation—which won several accolades, such as multiple Game of the Year honors—considered one of the "greatest games of all time" in 2004 by GameSpot.

== History ==
=== Early days ===
Cavedog Entertainment was a label created in 1995 by Humongous Entertainment, a developer of children's video games founded by Ron Gilbert and Shelley Day, to pursue the creation of mainstream games. Humongous Entertainment was originally independent, but was purchased in 1996 by GT Interactive.

In the same year Squaresoft closed its office in Redmond, many of their former developers were hired for Cavedog, notably game music composer Jeremy Soule and graphics designer Clayton Kauzlaric, who created the logo for Cavedog. After two years of development on Cavedog's first product, Total Annihilation, it was presented at the 1997 E3 in Atlanta, and published on September 30, 1997.

=== After Total Annihilation ===
Total Annihilation's creator, Chris Taylor, left the company shortly before the release of the Core Contingency expansion pack to found his own development house, Gas Powered Games. Cavedog released one more expansion pack, Battle Tactics, as well as many freely downloadable enhancements and patches, and built strong community support with their own online service, Boneyards (now shut down), that matched opponents and provided a continuing game campaign.

In 1999, Cavedog released Total Annihilation: Kingdoms, largely reusing the Total Annihilation game engine, but replacing the science-fiction theme with a fantasy one. Kingdoms did not resonate as well with critics or fans of the original title. One expansion pack was released, The Iron Plague.

=== Closure ===
The closure of Cavedog came as the game industry began to experience a downturn in sales, to which parent company GT Interactive was affected. Besides the Total Annihilation franchise, Cavedog had three other ambitious games in development, but only Total Annihilation and the related Kingdoms made it to store shelves, and their sales were much smaller than their user base.

The unfinished projects were: Amen: The Awakening, a first-person shooter; Elysium, a fantasy adventure title; and Good & Evil, an adventure title from Ron Gilbert. With GT Interactive spiraling into debt and no ship dates in sight, all three were discontinued by the fall of 1999.

GT Interactive was purchased by Infogrames and the Cavedog label was discarded by Humongous Entertainment in 2000, which renewed its focus on children's games. Cavedog declared bankruptcy in 2000. Humongous Entertainment was shut down in 2005 by Infogrames (now called Atari). Cavedog's developers have played significant roles at Gas Powered Games and Beep Industries.
