= Jeremy Soule =

American composer

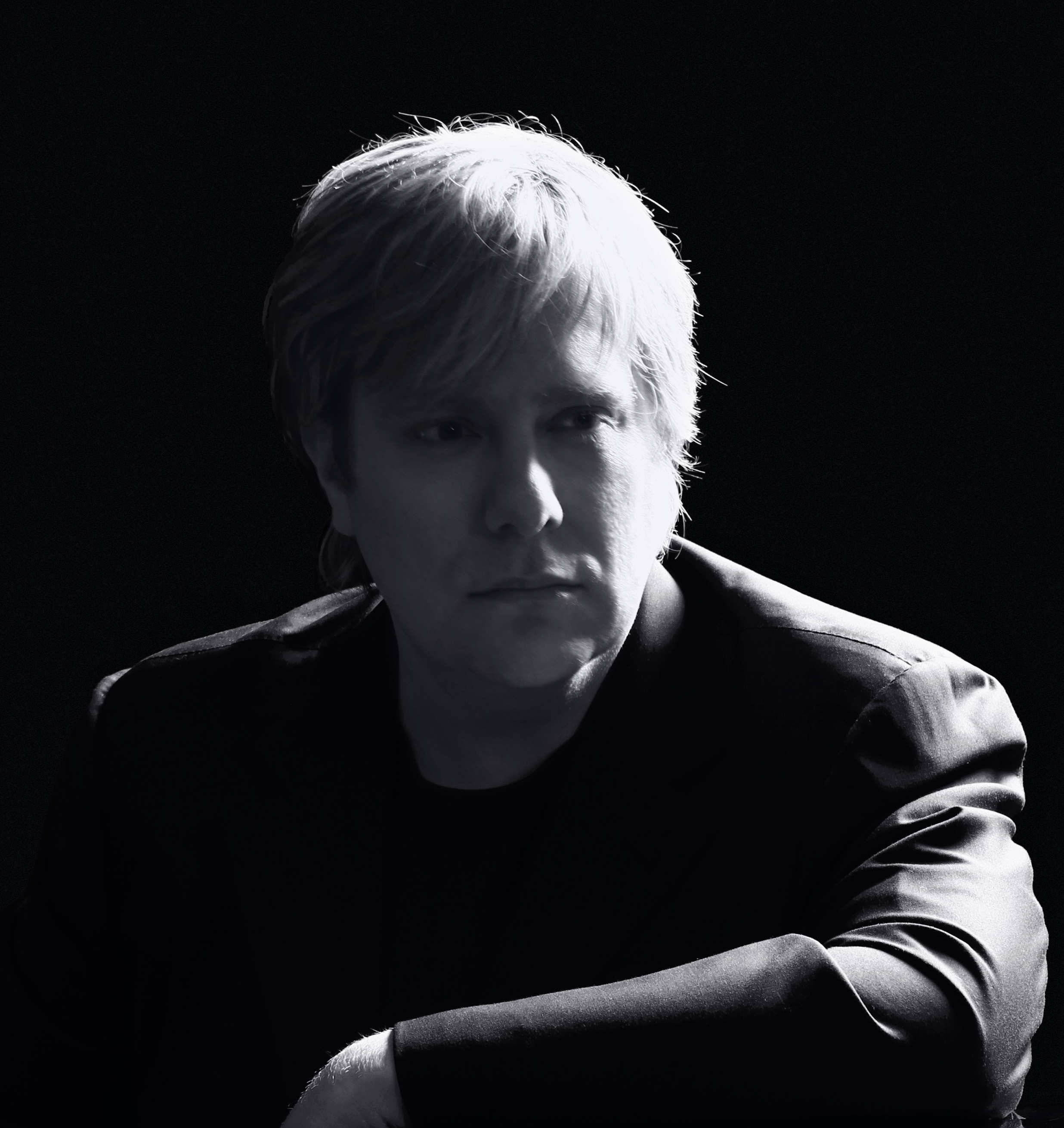
- Soule in 2010

Background information
- Born: February 15, 1975 (age 51); Iowa, U.S.
- Genres: Orchestral; classical; ambient
- Occupations: Composer; arranger; symphonist
- Instrument: Piano
- Years active: 1994–2019
- Labels: DirectSong (2005–19); Materia Collective (2017–19)

Jeremy Soule (/soʊl/ SOHL; born February 15, 1975) is an American composer of soundtracks for film, television, and video games. He has composed soundtracks for over 60 games and over a dozen other works during his career, including The Elder Scrolls, Guild Wars, Total Annihilation, and the Harry Potter series.

He became an employee of Square in 1994 after several years of private composition studies. After finishing the soundtrack to Secret of Evermore in 1995, he left to join Humongous Entertainment, where he composed for several children's games as well as Total Annihilation, his first award-winning score. In 2000, he left to form his own music production company, Soule Media, later called Artistry Entertainment. In 2005, he founded DirectSong, a record label that published digital versions of his soundtracks as well as those of classical composers. DirectSong remained active until 2019.

Soule's works have been played in several live concerts such as the Symphonic Game Music Concert in Germany and the international Play! A Video Game Symphony concert series. While many of his works are orchestral, he considers himself someone who creates more than just one type of music. Several of Soule's soundtracks were created with the help of his brother, Julian Soule.

== Early life ==
Soule was born in Iowa to a public school music teacher father and a graphic designer mother. He became interested in music and symphony orchestras at the age of five. Soule began taking piano lessons at an early age and became entranced with music, even writing music notation in the margins of his math homework; after his teachers and his father realized his talent, he began taking private lessons with professors from Western Illinois University when he was in sixth grade. He claims to have earned the equivalent of a master's degree in composition before completing high school; however, as he never enrolled in the school, he did not earn a degree. He was split between trying to become a concert pianist and a composer when he grew up; he ended up deciding to become a composer once he realized how difficult it would be to do both.

While playing video games as a child, Soule came to believe that the experience they created could be greatly enhanced by having a better musical score. After completing high school, he took a year to create a portfolio showcasing what he felt video game scores should sound like. Soule sent the tape to LucasArts and Square. Square very much appreciated the portfolio; he does not believe that LucasArts ever listened to his tapes as they had a "no unsolicited package" policy. Soule began working at Square in Seattle only two weeks after first submitting his demo tapes.

== Career ==
=== 1990s ===
Soule was given the task by Square to score Secret of Evermore. The finished game features an untraditional score incorporating ambient background sounds (like wind blowing and ocean waves) into the music, using a more mellow orchestral sound. When Ron Gilbert of LucasArts left to form his own company, Humongous Entertainment, and Square moved from Seattle to Los Angeles, Soule quit Square to score Gilbert's children's adventure game series, Putt-Putt; he was the company's third employee. Soule composed the soundtracks to several children's games over the next three years, including games in the Putt-Putt, Pajama Sam, and Freddi Fish series.

While working at Humongous, Soule met fellow employee and video game designer Chris Taylor, and signed on to compose the soundtrack to his major project, Total Annihilation. Soule convinced Taylor that, given the large number of other real-time strategy games coming out at the same time as Total Annihilation with techno scores, that to separate themselves they needed to do a large orchestral score. He wagered a year's worth of pay that doing so would be successful; Gilbert felt that it was, after the first sentence of the first review of the game he read was about the music. Given the software limitations at the time, to make the sound work correctly required a full live orchestra, the first that Soule had ever worked with; the orchestral tracks in Evermore had been performed by Soule and his brother, two instruments at a time. The soundtrack earned Soule his first award, that of "Best Music" of 1997 from GameSpot. Soule spent the next two years composing music for the game's two expansion packs and for children's games.

=== 2000s ===
In February 2000, Jeremy and his brother, Julian, formed Soule Media as an independent music production company; its name has since been changed to Artistry Entertainment. Julian works as a sound engineer and composer for the company, and has assisted Jeremy in several projects throughout his career, both credited and uncredited. The first large project that Jeremy Soule worked on through the company was 2000's Icewind Dale, which won the best music of the year award from both IGN and GameSpot.

In 2001, Soule scored the first of five Harry Potter games that he would work on between then and 2005. His first game, Harry Potter and the Sorcerer's Stone, was nominated for an Academy of Interactive Arts & Sciences award for Outstanding Achievement in Original Music Composition, while Chamber of Secrets and Prisoner of Azkaban won and were nominated, respectively, for a British Academy of Film & Television Arts award for Best Score in the Game Music Category. The other games he composed for that year include Baldur's Gate: Dark Alliance and Azurik: Rise of Perathia, which he later described as a bad game lifted up in the eyes of testers and reviewers by good music. He was responsible for composing the soundtracks to three top-selling role-playing games in 2002, those of Dungeon Siege, The Elder Scrolls III: Morrowind, and Neverwinter Nights; Morrowind earned him his second Academy of Interactive Arts & Sciences award nomination.

Soule was in a major car accident in the mid-2000s, during which he had a momentary realisation that life is precious. In interview, he described a vision of "Native American warriors" that he saw during the crash. The highway patrolman who arrived at the scene also invited him to meet a chief of the nearby Lummi Nation reservation who composed music. Soule stated that the experience provided inspiration during his subsequent compositions.

Artistry Entertainment scored a string of highly successful games through the remainder of the decade, including the Guild Wars series, Star Wars: Knights of the Old Republic, Warhammer 40,000: Dawn of War, and The Elder Scrolls IV: Oblivion. Oblivion was an award-winning soundtrack by Soule. It was nominated for the 2006 British Academy of Film & Television Arts and Academy of Interactive Arts & Sciences awards, and won the MTV Video Music Awards and Official Xbox Magazine soundtrack awards. Soule also worked on another of Chris Taylor's real-time strategy titles in 2007, with the launch of Supreme Commander.

In 2005, Jeremy and Julian Soule founded DirectSong, a company which sold downloads of compositions as well as works by dozens of classical composers. By 2007 the company had grown to over one million registered customers, though Soule noted that not all of those customers resulted in a sale of a non-free product. Soule says that the traffic numbers for DirectSong had surpassed some major record labels at times. Soule also used DirectSong to sell "expansion packs" of music for games such as Guild Wars that could be played in game like the rest of the soundtrack. He estimates that at least 10% of the players of Guild Wars bought his musical expansion for the game, Battle Pak 1. DirectSong struggled to fulfill orders or provide timely support, resulting in an "F" rating by the Better Business Bureau.

=== 2010s ===
Soule worked on several major titles in the early 2010s, including The Elder Scrolls V: Skyrim and Guild Wars 2. The Skyrim soundtrack in particular is among Soule's most critically acclaimed pieces of work, receiving a BAFTA nomination as well as numerous other awards from organizations such as the Game Audio Network Guild. Soule would also go on to compose the music for two of the official DLC packs for the game, Dragonborn and Dawnguard, both released in 2012. The Guild Wars 2 soundtrack was released a four-disc box set collection and well received. Soule was replaced as lead composer on the project later that year, with subsequent releases (such as expansions) being composed by Maclaine Diemer.

In March 2013, Soule launched a Kickstarter project to fund a classical music album called The Northerner: Soule Symphony No. 1, seeking $10,000 for the album. The campaign ultimately raised a total of $121,227. The project features vocals in Old Norse, with Soule citing the successful use of the similar Icelandic language by Malukah in one of her own projects during development. For the project, Soule indicated that his company were developing new audio technology. Soule began accepting refunds for the unreleased symphony in 2016. An album of sketches was ultimately released in 2017, though not the full symphony. As of 2025, the project has not been released.

In 2014, Soule also signed an MMO exclusivity deal with Sony Online Entertainment, to compose music for EverQuest Next and Landmark. EverQuest Next was canceled in March 2016; Landmark was released but shut down in February 2017, less than a year after launch. In 2015, Soule composed a Dota 2 music pack, along with his brother Julian. The soundtrack was available as part of the Compendium, a pack of digitally-distributed content that funded the prize pool for The International 2015 tournament, which took place in August 2015 and ultimately featured the largest prize-pool in e-sports history at the time, with over $18,000,000 in total. In the following few years he primarily worked on indie titles.

In 2014, Julian and Jeremy Soule co-founded an audio company named Virtual Sonics. The company entered into a joint venture with Roland Corporation in 2016, with Soule appointed co-director. Virtual Sonics produced digital instrumentation for Roland Cloud, which launched in 2018. Legendary Pictures co-founder Scott Mednick was an early investor in Virtual Sonics, but withdrew in August 2019 via a stock buyout. A dispute over the terms of the purchase ultimately led to a lawsuit between Mednick and Soule in 2022, which was resolved in favor of Soule.

== Controversies ==
In August 2019, Soule was accused of rape by game designer Nathalie Lawhead. He was also accused of sexual harassment by vocalist Aeralie Brighton. He denied the accusations and was never charged with a crime. Materia Collective ended their work with Soule on his symphony The Northerner in response, and Soule's official social media pages were taken down. Soule's music distribution platform DirectSong and his Bandcamp page were also seemingly taken offline around this time. A 2022 article in Journal of Sound and Music in Games analyzed the accusations in the wider context of the #MeToo movement and sexism in the games industry, commenting simply that "not much has been heard of Soule since."

== Performances ==
Soule's music has been played in several live concerts. His music from Harry Potter and the Chamber of Secrets was performed on August 20, 2003, at the first Symphonic Game Music Concert in Leipzig, Germany, and his music from Morrowind was performed at the third Symphonic Game Music Concert on August 17, 2005. Selections of his pieces from Morrowind and Oblivion are played in the international concert series Play! A Video Game Symphony. Jeremy Soule attended the world-premiere of Play! on May 27, 2006, in Chicago. Music from Oblivion has also been played at the Press Start 2007 -Symphony of Games- concerts in September 2007 in Japan. The first live orchestral concert dedicated to Soule's music for "Skyrim" took place on November 16, 2016, at London's Palladium theater.

== Legacy ==
Soule's music has been featured in numerous top-selling games; he once estimated in an interview that around 10 million games with his music in them were sold in 2006 alone.

Selections of remixes of Soule's work appear on English remixing websites such as OverClocked ReMix. Soule is a supporter of the game music arrangement community, even going so far as to submit his own arrangement to OverClocked ReMix. He did so to help promote and inspire younger and newer composers. The track, "Squaresoft Variation", arranges the Final Fantasy VI piece "Terra"; Soule has said that he chose the piece to remix because when he first started at Square he spent some time debugging the game before his composition duties for Evermore started.

== Musical style and influences ==
Soule rarely gets to see the game he is composing for in any sort of completed state before he begins work; as a result he bases many of his musical decisions on the company's previous games. He credits his success with this strategy to the fact that many of the games he works on come from studios that have created several successful games in the past. He finds it much easier to compose a soundtrack to a game that is very visual in nature, such as a role-playing game. He also likes to see the storyboards and concept art for the game, as he considers them a good provider of "pure emotional intent" for the game. When composing a soundtrack, the first thing that he decides is the tempo and the amount of energy the music will have; this decision is as much based on the genre of the game as it is the artistic style of the game. After that, Soule starts composing smaller tracks in the soundtrack, to make sure that they match up with the vision of the game before he starts on the major themes. Soule tries to compose all of a game's soundtrack himself rather than in a team, though he sometimes collaborates with his brother.

Although many of his works are orchestral in nature, Soule has denied that it is his "style", as he feels that the term boxes him into only creating one type of music. He prefers to call himself a "music practitioner", or someone who creates music in general rather than just one type of music as he is capable of many styles, such as Japanese pop, which he has written along with Jeff Miyahara. Soule considers music to be like a language, which can be arranged in many different ways if you understand the structure. He does not have a favorite genre of game to compose for, preferring instead to compose for "ambitious" games by people with "new ideas".

Soule's greatest musical influences are "Debussy's exploration of harmony", "Wagner's grand operas", and "Mozart's form and composition". While many of his orchestral works are based on movie scores in terms of scope, he does not often listen to movie scores, though he names his favorite composer as John Williams. The influence has been noted by critics, who have termed Soule "the John Williams of video game music". Among video game music influences, he has cited Square for providing him "with the education for what quality means to this business" and Nobuo Uematsu in particular. His favorite style of music to listen to is British pop and rock music, while his favorite video games are the ones that he has written scores to, especially the ones made by Chris Taylor, though one of his all-time favorites is The Legend of Zelda. He has said that the games he would most like to work on that he has not already are ones by Shigeru Miyamoto, a Final Fantasy game, and a Metroid game.

== Works ==
=== Video games ===
- Final Fantasy VI (1994) – testing only
- Secret of Evermore (1995) – with Julian Soule
- Freddi Fish & Luther's Maze Madness (1996)
- Freddi Fish & Luther's Water Worries (1996)
- Pajama Sam: No Need to Hide When It's Dark Outside (1996)
- Putt-Putt and Pep's Dog On a Stick (1996)
- Putt-Putt Travels Through Time (1997)
- Total Annihilation (1997)
- Pajama Sam's SockWorks (1997)
- Young Dilbert Hi-Tech Hijinks (1997)
- Spy Fox in "Dry Cereal" (1997)
- Total Annihilation: Core Contingency (1998)
- Pajama Sam: Lost and Found (1998)
- Spy Fox in Cheese Chase (1998)
- Total Annihilation: Kingdoms (1999)
- Icewind Dale (2000)
- Giants: Citizen Kabuto (2000)
- Rugrats: Totally Angelica Boredom Buster (2000)
- Amen: The Awakening (cancelled in 2000)
- Beauty and the Beast (2000)
- Total Annihilation: Kingdoms- The Iron Plague (2000)
- Rugrats in Paris: The Movie (2000)
- Icewind Dale: Heart of Winter (2001)
- Azurik: Rise of Perathia (2001)
- Baldur's Gate: Dark Alliance (2001)
- Final Four 2002 (2001)
- Harry Potter and the Philosopher's Stone (2001)
- Harry Potter and the Chamber of Secrets (2002)
- Dungeon Siege (2002)
- The Elder Scrolls III: Morrowind (2002)
- Natural Selection (2002)
- Magic School Bus Explores the World of Animals (2002)
- Neverwinter Nights (2002)
- SOCOM U.S. Navy SEALs (2002)
- Star Wars: Bounty Hunter (2002)
- EverQuest Online Adventures (2003)
- Harry Potter: Quidditch World Cup (2003)
- Sovereign (canceled in 2003)
- Star Wars: Knights of the Old Republic (2003)
- Unreal II (2003)
- Dungeon Siege: Legends of Aranna (2003)
- Impossible Creatures (2003)
- Harry Potter and the Philosopher's Stone (2003)
- Armies of Exigo (2004)
- Harry Potter and the Prisoner of Azkaban (2004)
- Lemony Snicket's A Series of Unfortunate Events (2004)
- Warhammer 40,000: Dawn of War (2004)
- Kohan II: Kings of War (2004)
- Guild Wars (2005)
- Harry Potter and the Goblet of Fire (2005)
- Dungeon Siege II (2005)
- Company of Heroes (2006)
- Company of Heroes: Opposing Fronts (2006) – with Inon Zur and Ian Livingstone. (music later reused and cinematics)
- Company of Heroes: Tales of Valor (2006)
- Warhammer: Mark of Chaos (2006)
- The Elder Scrolls IV: Oblivion (2006)
- Prey (2006) – with Julian Soule
- Guild Wars Factions (2006)
- Guild Wars Nightfall (2006) – with Julian Soule
- Guild Wars: Eye of the North (2007) – with Julian Soule
- Supreme Commander (2007)
- Supreme Commander: Forged Alliance (2007)
- IL-2 Sturmovik: Birds of Prey (2009)
- Order of War (2009)
- zOMG! (2009) (music later reused in Monster Galaxy)
- Metal Gear Solid: Peace Walker (2010) – with various others
- Dead Rising 2 (2010) – with Oleksa Lozowchuk, The Humble Brothers, and Julian Soule
- The Elder Scrolls V: Skyrim (2011)
- Deep Black (2012)
- Otomedius Excellent (2011) – with many others
- The Elder Scrolls V: Skyrim – Dawnguard (2012)
- Guild Wars 2 (2012)
- World of Warcraft: Mists of Pandaria (2012) – with many others
- The Elder Scrolls V: Skyrim – Dragonborn (2012)
- War Thunder (2013) – main theme only
- Dead Rising 3 (2013) – one song with Julian Soule
- Consortium (2014)
- The Elder Scrolls Online (2014) – title theme and cinematics
- Dota 2: The International 2015 Music Pack (2015) – with Julian Soule
- The Gallery: Call of the Starseed (2016)
- Landmark (2016)
- The Elder Scrolls Online: Morrowind (2017) – three songs with Brad Derrick
- The Gallery: Heart of the Emberstone (2017)
- Consortium: The Tower (2017)

=== Film and television ===
- Journey Toward Creation (2003) – documentary
- 2003 MTV Movie Awards (2003) – awards show
- C.S. Lewis: Beyond Narnia (2005) – television movie (co-credited with Julian Soule)
- Beyond the Yellow Brick Road: The Making of Tin Man (2007) – documentary short
- Florence Nightingale (2008) – television movie
- The Offering (2009) – short film
- Dracula's Stoker (2009) – documentary
- Witch Creek (2010) – feature
- KJB – The Book That Changed The World (2010) – documentary
- War for Peace (2011) – documentary series
- The Burdens of Shaohao: Prelude "The Vision" (2013)
- The Perfect Wave (2014) – feature
- Walk of Fame (2017) – feature
- Ice on Fire (2019) – documentary

=== Albums ===
- The Northerner Diaries (2017)

=== Theater ===
- Storyeum (2000)
- Ecstasy (2003)

== Awards ==
Awards
Year	Award	Category	Work	Result
2001	Academy of Interactive Arts & Sciences	Outstanding Achievement in Original Music Composition	Harry Potter and the Philosopher's Stone	Nominated
2003	BAFTA Games Awards	Best Score, Game Music Category	Harry Potter and the Chamber of Secrets	Won
2004	BAFTA Games Awards	Best Score, Game Music Category	Harry Potter and the Prisoner of Azkaban	Nominated
2006	BAFTA Games Awards	Best Score, Game Music Category	The Elder Scrolls IV: Oblivion	Nominated
2006	Academy of Interactive Arts & Sciences	Outstanding Achievement in Original Music Composition	The Elder Scrolls IV: Oblivion	Nominated
2006	MTV Video Music Awards	Best Video Game Score	The Elder Scrolls IV: Oblivion	Won
2006	Official Xbox Magazine	Soundtrack of the Year	The Elder Scrolls IV: Oblivion	Won
2012	ASCAP	Top Video Game	The Elder Scrolls V: Skyrim	Won
2012	The Hollywood Music in Media Awards	Original Score – Video Game	The Elder Scrolls V: Skyrim	Nominated
2012	Global Music Awards	Award of Excellence	The Elder Scrolls V: Skyrim	Won
2012	BAFTA Games Awards	Best Score, Game Music Category	The Elder Scrolls V: Skyrim	Nominated
2012	Game Audio Network Guild	Music of the Year	The Elder Scrolls V: Skyrim	Nominated
2012	Game Audio Network Guild	Best Original Vocal – Choral	The Elder Scrolls V: Skyrim	Won
2012	Game Audio Network Guild	Best Original Soundtrack Album	The Elder Scrolls V: Skyrim	Nominated
2012	The British Classic FM	Hall of Fame	The Elder Scrolls V: Skyrim	Won
