= Aramon =

Aramon may refer to:

- Aramon (grape)
- Aramon, Gard, a commune in the Gard department in southern France
- Aramón Cerler, a ski resort in Aragon
- One of the realms of Total Annihilation: Kingdoms
