= Deep Black (video game) =

2012 video game

- Developer: Biart
- Publisher: 505 Games
- Producer: Konstantin Popov
- Programmer: Eugene Solyanov
- Artist: Matthew Carofano
- Writer: Rafael Chandler
- Composer: Jeremy Soule
- Platforms: Microsoft Windows, PlayStation 3, Xbox 360
- Release: Microsoft Windows; April 18, 2012; Xbox 360 & PlayStation 3 April 25, 2012
- Genre: Third-person shooter
- Mode: Single-player

Deep Black is a third-person shooter video game developed by Biart and published by 505 Games for Microsoft Windows, PlayStation 3 and Xbox 360 in 2012. Initially entitled U-WARS and Underwater Wars, Russian studio Biart announced their publishing deal with 505 Games in July 2010, with a planned Q1 2011 release. At the time, it was only announced for the PlayStation 3 and Xbox 360, however a second announcement in October 2011 confirmed the game for OnLive.

Deep Black was released on Steam on April 12, 2012, as Deep Black: Reloaded and for consoles on April 25 as Deep Black: Episode 1. The game features an orchestral score written by Jeremy Soule, best known for his work in the Elder Scrolls and Guild Wars series. As of 2023, the game was no longer available on the Steam storefront.

== Gameplay ==
Most of the action in Deep Black takes place underwater, with players navigating the depths with "specialized underwater jet packs with integrated harpoons, mini submersibles and other high tech equipment." But it's not all swimming and shooting—505 promises a storyline with "complex science-fiction mystery, espionage, and bio-terror."

== Plot ==
Deep Black takes place in the near future amid political instability, espionage and terrorism, with competing factions seeking control of advanced biological weapons.

== Reception ==
The game received a "generally unfavorable" 47 rating from Metacritic. Reviews criticized poor animations and story, while praising the underwater control mechanics.

Writing for Official Xbox Magazine, Andrew Hayward rated the game a 2/10, criticizing the "obnoxiously tacky dialogue" and referring to the game as a "joyless, grace-free slog dominated by repetitive stop-and-pop shootouts, lifeless linear environments, and inconsistent weapon physics, not to mention full-stop gameplay pauses during certain actions."
