= Azurik: Rise of Perathia =

2001 video game

- North American cover art
- Developer: Adrenium Games
- Publisher: Microsoft Game Studios
- Director: Stephen Clarke-Willson
- Producer: Stephen Clarke-Willson
- Designer: Matthew Stipes
- Composer: Jeremy Soule
- Platform: Xbox
- Release: NA: November 27, 2001; PAL: May 17, 2002
- Genre: Action-adventure
- Mode: Single-player

Azurik: Rise of Perathia is an action-adventure game developed by Adrenium Games and published by Microsoft Game Studios in 2001. Azurik was released early in the Xbox console's life. It features a score by game composer Jeremy Soule, with additional music by Julian Soule.

== Gameplay ==
The game centers around the main protagonist, Azurik, as he journeys through the vast world of Perathia gathering elemental disc fragments scattered across the many realms. Azurik is part of the order of the Lore Guardians along with Eldwyn, the grand master and leader, and Balthazar, a professional scholar and combatant. After Balthazar teams up with the guardian of Death, they murder Eldwyn and destroy the balance of the elements by destroying the elemental discs, leaving Azurik alone. Now he must defeat Balthazar and bring back all of the disc fragments in order to restore balance, or else face the end of the world.

Azurik can harness the basic elements of Earth, Air, Fire, and Water. He can also mix and match powers to make more powers (e.g., when combined, Water, Air, and Fire make Lightning).

== Plot ==
Azurik, the protagonist and namesake of the game, is an adept in an order of warriors. Their job is to protect and preserve the balance of the six natural elements in the world. These elements are Fire, Earth, Air, Water, Life, and Death. The essence of the elements has been locked within special "Discs", which are kept in the tower in the middle of the Town. All that is, except one; the disc of Death had been lost a great deal of time before, and its location is unknown. Regardless of that fact, the world has managed to maintain the natural order.

In the opening sequence, Azurik is practicing the use of his staff weapon known as an "Axion". He is quickly confronted by a fellow member of his order, the dark and troubled Balthazar. They duel briefly, culminating in Azurik's near death at Balthazar's hands. Balthazar is stopped by Eldwyn, who suggests that Balthazar meditate his anger away. After Azurik leaves, Balthazar throws his Axion at the wall in a fit of rage, shattering a small vase and the wall behind it. When he does this, he accidentally reveals a secret room containing the Disc of Death.

Balthazar is possessed by the Guardian of Death that dwells in the Disc. He then attempts to steal the other Discs from the tower. He is interrupted in his attempt by Eldwyn and Azurik. A brief firefight breaks out and ends with Balthazar firing a power beam at Eldwyn. The resulting explosion shatters the disks and launches them into the far reaches of the world. Azurik, the sole survivor of his order, is tasked with retrieving all the fragments of the shattered discs and returning them to their original locations. To do this he must battle through a sequence of elementally-themed landscapes, solving various challenging puzzles and acquiring new elemental powers.

=== Characters ===
Lore Guardians

- Azurik: Azurik is the protagonist in the game. He is a young Lore Guardian and an apprentice to Eldwyn. His quick learning and fighting prowess have earned him the right to wield the Axion, the staff of the elements. After Eldwyn's death and Balthazar's betrayal, Azurik becomes the last Lore Guardian to protect the elemental balance in Perathia.
- Eldwyn: Eldwyn is the master of the guild of Lore Guardians and mentor to Azurik. He is wise and powerful and viewed by Azurik as somewhat of a father figure. He often scolds Balthazar for his aggressive actions and ambitions for great power and calmly tells him to meditate. Despite his power, he was murdered by Balthazar while trying to protect the elemental discs and Azurik. He still guides Azurik throughout much of the game in spirit and through a device called a Deluvian Oracle.
- Balthazar: Balthazar is a fierce fighter and Lore Guardian. His aggressive actions and desire for power have concerned Eldwyn for many years. Although he is strong and powerful, Eldwyn feels his desire to become Master Lore Guardian is more for personal gain and greed rather than noble purposes. This is shown when he finds the elemental disc of death and allows himself to be possessed by the death guardian to gain ultimate power or he may make it look like he was possessed. Together, they went into the tower and were about to take the discs but were interrupted by Eldwyn and Azurik. Balthazar eventually kills Eldwyn and destroys the balance of the elements by destroying the elemental discs.

The Elemental Guardians

- Water Guardian: The water guardian has the appearance of a large female water elemental with spiny fins on her head and sits in what seems like a large egg sac which is evident in several sea creatures. Her weakness seems to be her four tentacles made of water. The way to defeat her would be to freeze her tentacles with Ice, then attack it with Steam and continue the process until the tentacle is gone. Her main attacks are sending out giant bubbles to capture Azurik until they burst, sending out water elementals to attack him, using her tentacles as a whip should Azurik get close, or sending a shockwave of water from a distance.
- Earth Guardian: The earth guardian strongly resembles a giant mechanical mole. This seems to be a fitting reference as moles are tunnel diggers, in turn symbolizing the Earth realm. He sits atop a pagoda-like structure in the middle of the Earth realm desert and awaits prey to attack. The way to defeat him would be to find any acid blocks in the desert, melt them, avoid his many minions, and let the wandering sand tornadoes recoil and hit him. The earth guardian's attacks range from merely throwing rocks at Azurik to spawning rock-shard monsters everywhere and getting them to attack him.
- Fire Guardian: The fire guardian resembles a mechanical man who has no legs and floats on what appears to be some form of a jet pack. Ironically, despite him being the fire guardian, he is somehow immune to any water-based attacks, as he only laughs at Azurik's attempts to hurt him. The way to defeat the fire guardian would be to simply get close to him and attack him with lava (this is drawing on the "fight fire with fire" phrase). The only three attacks seen by the fire guardian appear to be striking from a distance by causing a stream of fire which curves into a hook-like shape, creating shards made of fire that are set to attack Azurik from the air, and creating a wall of fire around him upon being struck.
- Air Guardian: The air guardian's appearance suits her role as the guardian of air. Her home is in a floating castle high above Perathia. She has the appearance of a black elemental with huge fins on her head (similar to the water guardian) and she sports a slithering black tail and two pairs of wings bearing the symbol of air. The way to defeat her is similar to that of the fire guardian, but instead of fire, the player may use any power in the axion to stop her. Her attacks are more varied as she can strike with her tail, create little tornadoes, summon wind elements, disappear and reappear from lightning, create copies of herself, and shoot blasts of wind to hurt Azurik.
- Death Guardian: The death guardian has an ominous appearance, that of a black creature with large horns, long insect-like legs, thin spider-like arms, and extra-long three-fingered hands. At the beginning of the game, the death guardian is seen taking possession of Balthazar after finding the death disc and promising him more power. The death guardian would later appear in the game in only a short movie but still be in control of Balthazar before his betrayal when Balthazar and Eldwyn fight. His voice was used by Balthazar who had added mechanical appendages and other materials seen on Balthazar's body. The death guardian appears again when Azurik finds his way into the death realm and finds the death disc. It is revealed that the death guardian only possessed Balthazar to restore balance to the elements and Perathia. Azurik doesn't engage in a fight with the death guardian, for he hands the death disc over to be put in its proper place. This is short-lived when Balthazar destroys the guardian and takes up his position as the controller of life and death in Perathia. The death guardian's final appearance is at the end of the game when Azurik defeats Balthazar and leaves him in the death realm. Balthazar is lying on a lab table when the Death Realm minions come and restrain him. Balthazar is then greeted by the death guardian's disembodied head as it merges with his. This seems to mean that the death guardian has found a new host body.

== Setting ==
The entire game takes place in the mythical land of Perathia. It is a vast world that is split into six elemental realms, one for each elemental force. In the center is Town, the hub of the elemental realms and home of Azurik and the Temple of the Elements. The temple consists of a tall tower with four floors. The first floor has two elevators leading to the next floor and in the center of the room is a gate to the Life realm, which will become active when the Azurik gains three of the four missing pieces of the Life disc. The second floor contains another elevator in the center of the room which leads to the third floor. Around the elevator are ten objects that Azurik can gain each time he collects ten or more obsidian jewels. The third floor is an empty room with three elevators that lead to the top floor. The top floor is where the elemental discs were held prior to Balthazar's betrayal. The disc holder comprises a machine in the center with different colored lights indicating where each disc is put. On the grounds of the temple are four large objects representing each element. A floating spherical rock represents the earth realm, a complicated fan system represents the air realm, a bowl of lava represents the fire realm, and a large fountain represents the water realm. Each object will do a specific function once Azurik has completely restored a disc and put it in its proper place. There is no specific time period mentioned in the game, but although the architecture and the opening movie suggest a time of primitive technology, the world contains signs of advanced machines like large drills, tunnel borers, generators, conveyor belts, mine carts, and electrical equipment are seen throughout the realms and the Temple of the Elements and the plot suggests that the world is artificially created and maintained for the benefit of the people living there at some point long ago.

== Reception ==
Reception

Aggregate score
Aggregator	Score
Metacritic	52/100

Review scores
Publication	Score
AllGame	2/5
Edge	3/10
Electronic Gaming Monthly	3.83/10
Game Informer	4.5/10
GamePro	3/5
GameRevolution	C−
GameSpot	5/10
GameSpy	84%
IGN	6.5/10
Official Xbox Magazine (US)	3.7/10

The game received "mixed" reviews according to the review aggregation website Metacritic.
