= Consortium: The Tower =

- Developer: Interdimensional Games
- Publisher: Interdimensional Games
- Composer: Jeremy Soule
- Series: Consortium
- Engine: Unreal Engine 4
- Platforms: Windows; OS X Linux; Xbox One; PlayStation 4
- Genres: Role-playing, first-person shooter
- Mode: Single-player

Consortium: The Tower is an upcoming first-person shooter role-playing video game. It is the sequel to Consortium, developed by Interdimensional Games. It takes place in an alternate reality 2042.

The first Kickstarter campaign for Consortium: The Tower ended February 19, 2016, raising $182,780 CAD of the $450,000 CAD (US$138,016 of the US$339,791) goal. Interdimensional Games turned to Fig to raise US$300,000 which ended on May 11, 2016. The game was released to Steam Early Access on September 21, 2017. The game was originally expected to be released in 2019, but is currently in development hell.

== Plot ==
Consortium: The Tower follows immediately after the events of Consortium and continues Bishop Six's tumultuous initiation into the global police force known as the Consortium. Dropping onto the fictitious Churchill Tower in London in the year 2042, which has reportedly been occupied by Islamic terrorists thought to have been dealt with at the turn of the century. The conspiracies and deceptions continue to expand and unravel as Six works his way through the tower, dealing with Canadian drug peddlers, slimy journalists and the mysterious entity known only as The Voice. The Tower expands the cast bringing in a host of new friends and foes and revisits the existing relationships established in Consortium.

== Gameplay ==
The game offers a lot freedom of motion with a significant degree of verticality, allowing for typical running and jumping, but also charged super jumping, short boosts, and even flying in the form of the Free Fall Suit. Players have the choice of the more combat-focused Battle Utility Suit as well which has more limited movement in exchange for added protection. The former helps Bishop Six evade hostiles and obstacles while the latter allows him to confront them directly using an assortment of lethal and non-lethal weapons. Consortium: The Tower also allows players to talk to squad members, squad leaders, and major NPCS—even make "ghost noises" to draw attention or even defuse a situation gone wrong. The game follows Doom (2016) in using a dynamic ledge-grab system, that allows the player to climb onto surfaces if a jump or flight came up short of landing on it.

The Churchill Tower itself acts as an antagonist with nanites reshaping it: floors are bent perpendicular, the water treatment plant has been moved well over 100 floors above ground level, and turrets have erected themselves to impede the player. The Tower features secrets, mazes, and traps in interlocking maps that allow the player to complete objectives in virtually any order they want to.

== Development ==
Development on the project was troubled and has at various points been described as dead or abandoned. The game is currently in development hell.

=== Phase one (2015-19) ===
The team initially built the game in the Source Engine, before switching to Unreal Engine 4. A teaser trailer was uploaded in 2015. The soundtrack was composed by Jeremy Soule; the project was his final game soundtrack before the sexual misconduct allegations were made against him in 2019. The Tower was made available via Steam Early Access on September 21, 2017. The developers acknowledged at the time that the game was a long way from completion. A series of updates were released through to December 2019, after which the team instead focused on a re-release of the first game.

=== Phase two (2023-24) ===
"Phase Two" of development on The Tower commenced around 2023, and a new 1.12 patch was released in May 2024. A companion app for the game launched in July 2024. In November 2024, a 1.13 patch was released which includes all of Act 1 in a playable state as well as some preview areas from Act 2. After the 1.13 release, the developers stated that the game was in development hell, that development was currently "paused", and that consumers should not buy the game in its current state. The patch notes were accompanied by an apology, and a statement that the developers were "focusing on projects that are helping [them] survive this industry nightmare."

The developers had announced that the game would be migrated from Unreal Engine 4.15 to 4.27 (which was the final version before the switch to UE5). This would happen with the 2.0 release in future.

== Reception ==
The early access version of the game was met with mixed reception. PCGamesN were positive about the innovative nature of the game, but were frustrated by the lack of a quick save function and acknowledged that the game was "far from finished".
