= Amen: The Awakening =

- Developer: Cavedog Entertainment
- Publisher: GT Interactive
- Composer: Jeremy Soule
- Platform: Windows
- Release: Cancelled
- Genres: First-person shooter, role-playing
- Modes: Single-player, multiplayer

Amen: The Awakening was a first-person shooter developed by Cavedog Entertainment.

== Gameplay ==
The player navigates a future Earth in 2066, where one third of the population has suddenly gone insane, and progresses through missions that can be completed in multiple ways, such as outgunning guards, distracting them by triggering alarms elsewhere, or convincing them to leave peacefully. The player explores environments ranging from interior spaces to large outdoor areas using an engine that supports seamless movement between them, including levels like an aircraft carrier where the player can move from cramped interior corridors to the open deck and even swim beneath the ship among sharks. Throughout the game, the player uses weapons such as stun guns to incapacitate enemies without killing them and must balance stealth, action, and environmental interaction while investigating the cause of the global affliction.

== Plot ==
On Christmas Eve 2032, "The Awakening" happens. Over 4 billion humans go on a murderous rampage. In the ensuring chaos, planes crash, cities burn and millions are dead. In order to stop the rampage of the "Afflicted" the European Resistance Organization is formed in Western Europe to create a "Safe-Zone" where those who are not contaminated with the disease can live in harmony.

== Development ==
Amen: The Awakening was scheduled to be released in Summer 1999. It was cancelled in January 2000.

== See also ==
- Consortium (video game) - Spiritual successor to Amen: The Awakening
