= MTV Video Music Award for Best Video Game Score =

Annual music video award

The MTV Video Music Award for Best Video Game Score was only given out in 2006 as a complement to the Best Video Game Soundtrack award. With the 2007 revamp of the VMAs, this award was eliminated and never brought back.

== Winners ==
Year	Score	Winner	Nominees	Ref.
2006	The Elder Scrolls IV: Oblivion	Jeremy Soule	Dreamfall: The Longest Journey – Leon Willett; Electroplankton – User Generated Soundtrack; Hitman: Blood Money – Jesper Kyd; Ghost Recon: Advanced Warfighter – Tom Salta	
