= Warhammer: Mark of Chaos =

2006 video game

- North American Windows cover art
- Developer: Black Hole Entertainment
- Publishers: NA: Namco Bandai Games; PAL: Deep Silver; Digital: SNEG (Note: Initially published on GOG.com by Games Workshop)
- Composer: Jeremy Soule
- Series: Warhammer Fantasy
- Platforms: Windows, Xbox 360
- Release: Windows: NA: November 14, 2006; EU: November 24, 2006; AU: November 30, 2006; Battle March; Xbox 360: NA: September 2, 2008; AU: September 11, 2008; EU: September 12, 2008; Windows: NA: September 2, 2008; EU: September 18, 2008
- Genre: Real-time tactics
- Modes: Single-player, multiplayer

Warhammer: Mark of Chaos is a real-time tactics game set in the Warhammer universe. It was developed by Black Hole Entertainment and co-published by Namco Bandai Games in North America and Deep Silver in PAL territories in November 2006.

An expansion, Battle March, was released in September 2008. It contains one new campaign and the addition of Dark Elves and Orcs & Goblins as playable races. An Xbox 360 version was released and titled as Warhammer: Battle March, dropping the Mark of Chaos moniker.

== Gameplay ==
An Empire Warrior Priest in a Duel with a Khorne Daemon Prince.

The game, according to the developers, is a game "focusing on the armies and battles while de-emphasizing the tedious aspects of base and resource management". Set in the Warhammer Old World, the player can command one of four armies from the tabletop game.

The gameplay is primarily focused on battlefield tactics, thus not featuring RTS gameplay aspects like base-building, resource harvesting or in-battle unit production. Instead, the gameplay is intended to be focused on high fantasy/late medieval battles. Its gameplay is superficially similar to its predecessors and the Total War games; however, the basic game play model is significantly more simplified, and battles are more similar to real-time strategy games like Warcraft III than other real-time tactics titles.

The objective for each battle is defeat of the enemy army by either completely destroying it or causing the remaining units to flee off the battlefield. Battles are fought on a variety of landscapes and settings, with specific terrain types granting bonuses or penalties to units. Units also have morale, and will break and flee if they suffer enough damage or get hit by specific types of weaponry, and stamina, which will cause them to lose defense and speed when sufficiently drained.

The troops present in the game are presented as "units", which is anything from 1 to 96 individual "models", with the specific number depending on the type of unit. The control system is similar to the Total War and Dawn of War in that orders are issued to units in their entirety, as opposed to being issued to individuals. As well as standard orders you are also able to arrange your units into a number of formations, with each formation conferring advantages against specific kinds of attacks. Units will also gain experience over the course of a battle or campaign and will gain improved statistics and more models.

In addition to standard units there are special "Hero" units; unique individuals considerably more powerful than the average combatant. In addition to being able to use and learn new abilities, they can also be equipped with additional weapons, armour or potions that grant the hero with both offensive and defensive skills and bonuses. Heroes also gain experience from fighting, and by gaining levels the player is able to unlock various skills that supplement its combat abilities. Unlike units which consist of multiple models, Heroes are controlled individually. However they can be attached to standard units, fighting alongside the unit's models, giving the unit a morale boost and increasing its fighting capability through the use of skills. Hero units can also initiate or be challenged to duels, where they fight the opposing army's hero uninterrupted until one slays the other, resulting in a morale penalty for the losing side. The duel is for the most part out of the player's control, however the player is also free to activate any duel-specific skills the hero has during the course of the duel, to affect its outcome.

=== Single Player ===
There are two single player campaigns, each separated into four chapters, one following the Empire and Elven Forces and the other the Hordes of Chaos and Skaven forces.

The majority of the single campaign is a number of different battle scenarios, in which your pre-selected force will combat a number of enemy forces. Winning the scenario will award the player gold. Between battles the game switches to a map of the area, with the location of their army denoted by a figure of their champion. The player is then able to select their army and move to another location. This will bring up a force selection screen, and the player will then have to select a limited number of troops and heroes to play the next scenario with. Although the campaign is for the most part linear, there are also optional side quests, which although mostly unrelated to the main story will usually result in the heroes acquiring additional gold, troops or equipment that can be used in the campaign. As well as traditional large scale battles there are also Duel scenarios in which a hero character of your choice will enter straight into a duel with an enemy champion, with victory of either champion immediately ending the scenario.

On the map the player can also access towns and encampments, which serve as the replacement for bases found in other strategy and tactic games. The player can use the gold acquired in previous battles to purchase replacements, new or improved units, upgrades such as better armour or attack power for their existing units and also wargear and items for their hero units. Conversations between characters will also occur at certain points on the map, advancing the story.

In addition to the campaign, the multiplayer modes can also be played as single player skirmish battles.

=== Multiplayer ===
The Army Editor, displaying the wide range of model customisation options.

The game allows for up to four players to battle using either a LAN or over the internet. Multiplayer battles are played in much the same way as the single player. The game includes four different game modes, including normal battles, siege battles where one team has to defend a stronghold from the opposing army, and a reinforcements mode, where capturing strategic points on the map awards points that enable players to buy new units during the battle.

Prior to the battle, each player has a certain number of points with which to select an army, which is chosen by the host of the game prior to army selection. The points can be used in a variety of different ways, either buying new units, upgrading units or buying additional equipment or skills for your hero units. This enables a player to outfit an army in a variety of styles suitable for their playing style. Although the player is free to choose any configuration, there are also examples of army configurations for each of the 12 factions featured in game. In a tribute to the tabletop game, players are also able to customise their army's colours and banners. In addition, there is also a comprehensive model editor where players can change the look of individual models using a variety of heads, limbs, armour and weaponry sets. These army configurations can then be saved for use later.

== Setting ==
The map of the Warhammer Old World. The campaigns of the game are set primarily in the Empire and the region of Kislev.

The setting of Mark of Chaos is the Old World of the Warhammer Fantasy universe, one year after the Great War against Chaos. In the aftermath of the war, the chaos warbands scattered, some returning to their homelands in the north, some staying and raiding the farms and villages in the northern fringes of the Empire. The Empire, already pushed to the brink of collapse as a result of the war, is undermanned and struggles to protect the isolated farms and villages. If the tribes of chaos were once again to reunite, the Empire would most likely fall. The game has 2 campaigns that follow the story from both the Empire and Chaos perspectives, with each campaign having a different progression of events.

=== Races ===
The game features four different playable races from the Warhammer game, and the units available to each race are taken straight from the tabletop wargame. All the races are visually distinctive, and have their own unique units, although there is a lot of crossover between factions and each type of unit will usually have an equivalent unit in another race. Within each race there are also three different factions, which are available to be used in multiplayer games. However beyond cosmetic differences, and the selection of troops there is minimal difference between the 3 factions.

The Empire is a vast human empire which resembles early modern (16th century) Germany in its looks and organisation. Their forces are primarily human soldiers of various specialties. In addition they are, along with the Dwarves, one of the few races who have developed black powder weaponry, and have access to handguns, cannons, and other gunpowder based siege weapons. The 3 playable factions are the Ostermark, Nuln and Talabecland armies.

The High Elves are an ancient and elegant race. In addition to their normal ranks of elven spearmen and archers, they have a considerable number of elite troops, and an above average number of magical specialists. The 3 playable factions are the Ellyrian, Shadowlands and Saphery kingdoms.

The Hordes of Chaos are Humans from the Northlands, corrupted by the gods of Chaos by their ambition, lust or the other base instincts and emotions of humanity. In addition to human warriors and Marauders they also have access to supernatural creatures such as Daemons and Spawns of Chaos. The 3 playable factions are the cults of the chaos gods Nurgle, Khorne and the pantheon Chaos Undivided.

The Skaven are a race of subterranean man sized rats. Though as individuals they are weaker than members of the other races, they compensate through vastly superior numbers. In addition they utilise a mineral called warpstone to mutate members of their race to create giant rats and rat ogres. The 3 playable factions are the Eshin, Skryre and Warlord clans.

In addition to the four playable races there are also additional races that serve as both additional enemies in the single player campaigns and also as mercenary "Dogs of War" units available at certain points in the single player campaign, and also as additional choices in multiplayer games. The available mercenary races are Greenskins and Dwarves. The Vampire Counts are also present in the single player campaign, but are not available to be used by the player.

=== The Hordes of Chaos Campaign ===
The Chaos campaign follows the progress of Thorgar the Blooded One, a Chaos champion who fought alongside the warlord Asavar Kul in the Great War. Now he is looking to build his forces to launch another attack on The Empire. During this time he is guided by a sorcerer by the name of Sudobaal, who instructs Thorgar to lead his men to a Chaos shrine. After enduring a series of trials Thorgar obtains the favour and patronage of one of the chaos pantheon; either Nurgle or Khorne, depending on the player's choice. Sudobaal then instructs Thorgar to locate an elven mage who knows the location of the body of the defeated Chaos warlord Asavar Kul. During this time he allies with Kasquit, a skaven warlock engineer of clan Skryre. Having angered the skaven council, Kasquit quickly accepts the alliance in order to receive Thorgar's protection, and agrees to help Thorgar locate the mage. The campaign concludes with Thorgar killing Sudobaal for turning on him and his elevation to daemonhood, and the subsequent destruction of the city of Talabheim. Roaring his victory to the gods and claiming he can't be defeated. In the distance a huge greenskin army is preparing to launch its own attack against the Old World, this possibly heralding the game's expansion: Battle March.

=== The Empire Campaign ===
The Empire campaign is played from the perspective of "Stefan von Kessel" a captain in the army of Ostermark under Count Otto Gruber. He is plagued by his sad past – his father, the former Count of Ostermark and grandfather were killed for Chaos worship, deprived of their lands, and the child Stefan was branded across his eye with the mark of chaos. The campaign starts with an adult Stefan fending off an attack by chaos marauders. The battle is won and Gruber, Stefan and the other captains hold a council of war. Stefan heads north towards a fortress and engages in several battles with Chaos and Orc forces along the way. He takes the fortress, though he damages it in the process. After a heated exchange between himself and Gruber, he is sent to help the elves after the Reiksmarshal brings "requests" from the Emperor. It's at this point we meet Aurelion, an Archmage of Saphery. Stefan sets camp while the elves go to gather their forces who are arriving by sea. The elves depart and Aurelion finds her people have been scattered. She gathers them and after fighting Chaos and Skaven forces they arrive at a fortress soon to be assaulted. The story switches back to Stefan who makes his way to the fortress to relieve Aurelion and the other defenders. After the battle Stefan and Aurelion speak with Prince Khalanos who wants Stefan to go north with him to counter the advance of Chaos while Stefan's orders are to head east to deal with a gathering. In the end they go their separate ways and Stefan, after helping Brother Gunther (a warrior priest of Sigmar defending a shrine from the Skaven), learns that Count Otto Gruber (whose army could not be found) was guilty of worshiping Nurgle, the Chaos god of the rot. Stefan is outraged for it was Gruber who accused his father and grandfather taking their lands for his own and in fact, accusing them to cover his own misdeeds. Stefan retrieves a Daemon slayer's sword from the tomb of a vampire count and heads east to deal with Gruber. He is stopped, however, by plague clouds, and he is forced to pull back. Meanwhile, Aurelion and her warriors decide to find out more about the clouds. They locate and destroy a shrine dedicated to Nurgle, allowing Stefan to make for Gruber's fortress. Stefan arrives to find a massacre: Gruber's army has been slaughtered after they had discovered his treachery. Stefan attacks and destroys Gruber's defenses and mortally wounds the betrayer. By right of deed and ancestry, Stefan claims Gruber's sword, a Runefang and symbol of an Elector Count of the Empire. The Reiksmarshal returns and informs Stefan that the Emperor has restored him the lands taken by Gruber and named him the new Count of Ostermark. Stefan then must face Thorgar the Bloodied One, a Chaos Champion that has ascended to Daemonhood, in the Campaign's final chapter.

== Development ==
Development of the game was given to Black Hole Entertainment, who were hired by Namco Bandai Games after being impressed by their work on the real-time strategy title Armies of Exigo.

Two different styles of box art were released, one depicting an Empire Warrior Priest and the other depicting a Chaos Champion. At the same time, a Collector's Edition was released, containing the official soundtrack on audio CD, the official novelization written by Anthony Reynolds, an art book, posters and several Warhammer themed ornaments.

== Soundtrack ==
The game features an orchestral soundtrack composed entirely by award-winning composer Jeremy Soule, who is most famous for his work on Supreme Commander, The Elder Scrolls IV: Oblivion, Icewind Dale, and the Guild Wars series of video games. The entire soundtrack is included in audio CD format in the Collectors Edition box set. The CD is not sold separately, however it is available for download direct from Soule's website.

Track list

1. Warhammer Theme (1:48)
2. Trial of the Gods (1:34)
3. The Hordes Advance (2:10)
4. For the Dark Gods! (1:33)
5. Preparing for Battle (1:13)
6. Men of the Empire, Make Ready! (1:21)
7. Sigmar Protects (2:16)
8. Forges of Nuln (1:44)
9. From the North They Come (2:05)
10. Leave None Alive! (1:46)
11. The Siege of Gotterung (1:09)
12. Onwards to Victory! (1:55)
13. Patrolling the Old World (1:49)
14. Unscrupulous Methods (2:13)
15. Skulls for the Skull Throne! (1:44)
16. Dark Winds (2:14)
17. Stefan's Vengeance (2:42)
18. For the Emperor (2:07)
19. Vigilance and Strength (2:10)
20. Sudobaal's Treachery (1:20)
21. Stalking the Prize (2:13)
22. Shallya Watch Over Us (1:48)
23. Patrolling the Borders (2:06)
24. The Aftermath of War (1:55)
25. The Talebheim Crater (1:51)
26. Grim Preparations (2:09)
27. Mark of Chaos (1:06)

== Reception ==
Reception

Aggregate scores
Aggregator	Score
GameRankings	74/100
Metacritic	73/100

Review scores
Publication	Score
Edge	6/10
Game Informer	6.75/10
GameSpot	7.2/10
GameSpy	3.5/5
IGN	8/10
Official Xbox Magazine (US)	5.5/10
PC Gamer (UK)	69/100
PC Gamer (US)	83/100
PC Zone	82/100

The game was received with mixed and extremely varying reviews. Reviewers generally praised its distinctive and varied visuals, with the character models and the special effects earning high praise from the majority of reviews, but also criticised the rather basic combat animations and a shallowness of tactical depth for a game focusing purely on battlefield operations.

The single player campaigns received criticism for its linearity, and the storytelling especially when compared to the game's opening cinematic. The multiplayer support was also disparaged for its temperamental and glitch-prone account system and connection issues, although this was addressed and partly fixed in subsequent patches.

Despite the criticisms received however, the game was received positively overall, obtaining an average score of 73 at Metacritic, and similarly an average score of 74% at GameRankings with over 80% of reviews scoring 70% or better.

=== Criticism ===
The game received criticism upon release, mainly centered on two things: the marketing of the game, and, related to this, the lack of faithfulness to the Warhammer tabletop original.

Before release, Warhammer: Mark of Chaos was claimed to feature "dynamic cooperative campaign mode and a full assortment of multiplayer modes for both casual and competitive gamers". However, the cooperative campaign was omitted from the released game, even though still marketed as featuring this (the developer's homepage still listed it as a feature as of July 2007). Mark of Chaos was marketed as of "epic" scale, with "thousands of characters battling on screen"; in reality, the game features hundreds rather than thousands of individual characters. Namco, the publisher, targeted the substantial tabletop game fan base by naming Mark of Chaos a faithful translation to computer game format. However, core elements of the tabletop game (e.g. formation movement rules, combat resolution systems, and unit overlap prohibitions) are missing, invalidating tabletop tactics.

Further common sources of criticism in reviews, discussion and technical support are that the game suffers from numerous bugs, instability and prohibitively long load screens: "the standard loading screen is preceded by its own loading screen, for meta-loading", as Game-Revolution put it in their review. Also, the hero duels, one of the more distinctive features of the game, are often singled out as dull, repetitive or distracting.

== See also ==
- List of Games Workshop video games
