= Total Annihilation: Battle Tactics =

- Cover art for the original release
- Developer: Cavedog Entertainment
- Publisher: GT Interactive
- Producer: Kellyn Beck
- Designer: Richard W. Smith
- Series: Total Annihilation
- Platform: Windows
- Release: NA: July 20, 1998
- Genre: Real-time strategy
- Modes: Single-player, multiplayer

Total Annihilation: Battle Tactics is the second expansion pack for the real-time strategy video game Total Annihilation, released on June 30, 1998, in the United States. Its features include 100 new missions as either the Arm or the Core, four new units and new keyboard shortcuts. Six new multiplayer maps are included, and, for the first time in the Total Annihilation series, some single-player missions are set on acid and crystal worlds.

== Gameplay ==
The two previous installments of the Total Annihilation series bore a distinct focus on resource and economy management, requiring the player to show an adept knowledge of economic skill to successfully complete a mission; lack of the ability to manage resources would usually result in the player's downfall. Missions would often begin with the player's Commander (and several small units designed for light defense until a secure base could be established), placed amongst a variety of enemies, with limited resources in which to create and defend a base.

Battle Tactics broke from this trend, focusing missions on battles, as the title would suggest. In many missions, particularly in short or very short campaigns, the player begins with all of the units required to complete the mission objective, perhaps even lacking the Commander in certain missions. This tests the player's ability to control and micromanage large groups of units, rather than their ability to manage a vast economy, which results in rather large battles, sometimes even requiring the player to reduce the game speed or else allow the AI computational freedom and lose control of the battle.

This was met with mixed reactions and became one of the sources of criticism for Battle Tactics. Many gamers loyal to the original gameplay methods disliked how many of the scenarios eliminated resource management as critical component of the game, since its revolutionary economy system is part of what made Total Annihilation unique and popular. Other players came to accept Battle Tactics for what it was meant to be - a completely different side of the RTS, to be discovered in its own way.

Mission-balancing was also an issue with the expansion pack. Some missions in the very short campaign could turn out to take longer than others in the long campaign. Furthermore, some missions played on the Hard setting could be amply completed by novice players, while some missions set on the Easy setting would be extremely difficult even for an experienced player.

== Reception ==
Reception

Aggregate score
Aggregator	Score
GameRankings	64 of 100 (based on 3 reviews)

Review scores
Publication	Score
GameSpot	6.9 of 10
PC Zone	7.4 of 10

Battle Tactics received low ratings compared to the other games in the series. GameSpot cited its lack of new content, saying it had "a mere handful of its own unique additions".

Some blame its poor design on Chris Taylor's departure from Cavedog Entertainment, who had originally spearheaded the other two works in the series, as Battle Tactics was made without him.
