= Sovereign (video game) =

Sovereign was a massively multiplayer online real-time strategy (MMORTS) game developed for PC by Daybreak Game Company (known at the time as Sony Online Entertainment) that was cancelled sometime from 2001 to 2003 after more than four-and-a-half years of development.

Announced in August 1999, Sovereign would have focused on battle, trading, diplomacy, and economic power between various Houses that players could join, with large-scale guild wars taking place on various planets holding up to 500 players at a time. Each player would be given their own "homeworld" as a form of safe-house to store resources.

Being one of the first attempts at developing an online game of this scale and nature, the project would ultimately be cancelled relatively early into development. Scott McDaniel, vice president of marketing and public relations for Sony Online Entertainment at this time, commented, "We came to a decision that it was not going to be what we wanted it to be, It never really had the magic."

After Sovereign's cancelation, all employees working on the game would instead be moved to work on Star Wars Galaxies and EverQuest II, similar games which would release in 2003 and 2004 respectively.
