= Consortium (video game) =

2014 video game

- Developer: Interdimensional Games
- Publisher: Interdimensional Games
- Designer: Gregory MacMartin
- Composer: Jeremy Soule
- Engine: Source
- Platforms: Windows, Meta Quest
- Release: WW: January 8, 2014
- Genres: Role-playing, first-person shooter
- Mode: Single-player

Consortium is a first-person shooter role-playing video game developed by Interdimensional Games for Microsoft Windows. The game is set almost entirely on a futuristic aircraft called Zenlil, crewed by a complement with chess-themed ranks. The game was principally financed by the Canada Media Fund by awarding a grant for $500,000 CAD in 2010. After a first failed Kickstarter campaign in 2012, US$70,435 was raised through Kickstarter on April 18, 2013. Consortium was released on January 8, 2014. A sequel, Consortium: The Tower, was released to Steam Early Access on September 21, 2017. Consortium VR and Consortium Remastered were both released on May 21, 2024. Consortium VR is available on Meta Quest and SteamVR.

== Gameplay ==
The game features conversational mechanics which allow gameplay to be uninterrupted by conversations: replies are bound to the function keys and an in-game device allows for semi-telepathic communication. The other major feature is a branching story, similar in execution to the Mass Effect trilogy, and a character alignment system: both of these allow for every playthrough to be different, even to the point of allowing the player to reveal the meta-plot of the game. While the game is a first-person shooter, combat can be entirely avoided, non-lethal or lethal (in a similar style to Deus Ex), and is limited due to the size of the game world.

== Plot ==
The game is set in the mid-21st century, in a timeline where most world militaries have been disbanded in favour of a technologically advanced world police force called the Consortium. The player assumes control of Bishop 6, an elite Consortium soldier. The game's fiction acknowledges that the player and Bishop 6 are different characters, connected through the interdimensional link of the video game. Non-player characters may not be aware that Bishop 6 is being controlled from afar.

During a flight from Bulgaria to Ireland on the aircraft Zenlil, Bishop 6 must deal with hostile mercenaries while trying to uncover the identity of a traitor within the crew.

== Reception ==
The game received mixed reviews, with a score of 66/100 on reviews aggregation website Metacritic. Reviews praised the storytelling but noted the amount of software bugs in the game. Interdimensional Games sought to address those bugs with the Master Edition patch, released in April 2014. A retrospective at Rock, Paper, Shotgun reflected on the game's fourth wall breaking central conceit, and how it was supported by the conversation and dialogue options. It concluded that "None of this would work in another medium. Consortium offers a solid sample of what we’ve been saying games have the potential to do for a generation."

== See also ==
- Amen: The Awakening - Spiritual precursor to the Consortium lore.
