= Total Annihilation: The Core Contingency =

1998 video game

- Developer: Cavedog Entertainment
- Publisher: GT Interactive
- Designer: Chris Taylor
- Series: Total Annihilation
- Platforms: Windows, Mac OS 9
- Release: NA: April 30, 1998
- Genre: Real-time strategy
- Modes: Single-player, multiplayer

Total Annihilation: The Core Contingency is a 1998 expansion to the 1997 real-time strategy Video game Total Annihilation. It contains extra units and maps, as well as a campaign of 25 missions and a map editor.

== Story ==
The Core Contingency picks up where the original game finishes with the Arm ending, in which the Arm achieved final victory over the Core in its homeworld Core Prime, in their Galactic War of over 4,000 years. With the Core supposedly wiped out of existence, the Arm undergoes one-hundred years of reconstructing civilization.

However, a lone Core Commander survives, hidden away in a distant system. The Core Commander, the heart of the Core's Contingency plan in case the Core would ever be defeated, is charged with a single mission: to search for a powerful and ancient alien artifact hidden in the region. With modifications, the beacon could supposedly be converted into an Implosion Device—a single, phenomenally powerful superweapon which, when activated, would cause the entire galaxy to implode into itself, with the Core's pure intention to permanently extinguish the Arm. The Core Commander would stay inside the gigantic machine as it causes the galaxy to virtually self-destruct, then step out unscathed and rebuild the entire Core race.

Meanwhile, rumors circulate amongst the mending Arm over the said Contingency Plan, so an Arm Commander is dispatched along with sizable reinforcements to confirm or eliminate the gossip.

== Gameplay ==
The Core Contingency, while fixing various bugs and glitches from the original game, features 25 new missions following the events after the original game's Arm campaign. 12 missions pertain to each side for the Arm and the Core, and a bonus mission is included, named "Krogoth Encounter".

"Krogoth Encounter" is an Arm bonus mission, set during the time of the original game (which allows it to technically be considered a "lost mission") during the Galactic War on the metallic world of Core Prime, as the Arm was slowly making its way to domination. The level is available only in Hard difficulty, with its highlight being experimental, super-powerful Krogoth Kbots which the player must overcome and whose production facilities the player must destroy. Because it chronologically occurs before The Core Contingency, new units introduced in the expansion pack are not available during the mission.

The Core Contingency missions provide new worlds with idiosyncratic natural disasters, such as the planet Temblor, whose only habitable land lies on mountains high above clouds, which suffers frequent, unpredictable earthquakes that can damage structures and ground forces. It additionally features native, hostile alien inhabitants of various planets, such as dangerously powerful sea creatures on the campaign's opening world (Hydross, an ocean planet), and biomechanical Scorpions on Lusch, a bog world.

== Reception ==
Reception

Review scores
Publication	Score
The Cincinnati Enquirer	4/5
The Sydney Morning Herald	3/5
