= Armies of Exigo =

2004 video game

- Developer: Black Hole Entertainment
- Publisher: Cinergi Interactive
- Composer: Jeremy Soule
- Platform: Microsoft Windows
- Release: NA: November 30, 2004
- Genre: Real-time strategy
- Modes: Single-player, multiplayer

Armies of Exigo is a real-time strategy video game for Microsoft Windows. The game was developed by Black Hole Entertainment, published by Cinergi Interactive and distributed by Electronic Arts. One unique aspect of the game is that it has an underground mode. This makes the game more challenging as the player has to work on two fronts and might have an army come from an unexpected area.

In October 2006, EA shut down the online servers for the game.

Main window

== Gameplay ==
The gameplay appears to be very similar to Warcraft III, especially considering the factions involved: The Empire (Humans, Elves, Dwarves, etc.), the Beasts (Lizardmen and other barbaric humanoid creatures), and the Fallen (Undead, insectoid, and eldritch monsters). The player has to gather resources (gold, wood, and gems) to produce units and buildings, as well as to research spells and upgrades. The player can also select units and give them orders to attack, move or build. Different unit types are built at different structures.

It follows the "old-school" style of RTS gameplay that was commonplace in the 1990s in titles such as Warcraft II, StarCraft, and the Age of Empires series.

== Leveling system ==
A unit can gain levels in the game through killing enemy units and so gather experience points. By gaining a level a unit becomes stronger. Almost all units in the game can level up to level 5 except for mechanical units, phoenixes and most of the spell-caster units. The Empire and The Beast units level individually and The Fallen as collective by gathering experience points in their Soul Trap.

== Characters ==
Alric do Rei

Alric do Rei concept art

He is a young mage of the Obsidian Tower. His master dies just before the Beasts' invasion begins, so Alric has no other choice but to take his master's place as High Lord of the Council of Mages, an organization of powerful wizards who govern Noran.

It seems that only his visions and knowledge of spells can save the Empire from total annihilation and he's also often called "Chaosbringer", because of his "defence" of Castle Margoth, which ended up destroying not just most of the armies of the Beast Invaders, but the castle itself as well.

He has the habit of surviving the most dangerous situations with ease, an ability which greatly angers his enemies, particularly his nemesis, Keran Kessertin.

Dunehelm Bellangere

He's in command of Noran's garrison and he's the Lord of Castle Margoth, as well as Alric's best friend and disciple. He is very brave as he faces every kind of hideous creatures without any fear, and he never loses his mind. He gets great importance in the story when a rebelling lord, Vangarath captures Alric, and he has to liberate the wizard.

Usual gameplay, under ground

Ruannon Flamebringer

A wizard who died ages ago and is considered the greatest wizard of the Obsidian Tower. Alric do Rei, as stated by Lord Keran, is largely like Ruannon and therefore can be his true successor and ultimately the person ending the menace of the Fallen race.

Ruannon, in his lifetime, fought the Fallen several times and uncovered much of their dark plans. He defeated the Two Fathers of the Fallen and sealed them away in the Chamber of Screams. He discovered the true nature of the Heart of the Void, a stone which the Fallen can use to melt the world, in which the stone resides, into their own dark plane of existence and crafted the Three Seals, which prevent the Stone from working and as a last line of defense constructed, using mostly only his vast amounts of magical power, the Obsidian Tower and founded the Council of Mages to guard the Stone and the Order of Ruannon to watch over the Seals and the Chamber of Screams.

After his death, his remains where buried in an elven forest. Centuries later, Princess Domina promises him to release his soul if he agrees to tell her the location of the seals, and Ruannon, without a second of hesitation agrees to comply, greatly easing the work of the Fallen.

Keran Kessertin

The leader chanter of the Fallen Swarms, who obeys the Ageless Ones, the leader of the Fallen. His quest is to seize the Heart of the Void, an artifact that was created by the Dark Dreamer in order to melt this world into their own.

Fallen race

To complete this mission, he first disguises himself as a wizard of the Empire and sends Alric to Castle Margoth, hoping he will be killed in the fighting. Greatly amused by Alric's survival, he tries yet again to remove Alric from his way by sending him to his own domain, where to he, in Alric's absence, invited several Warlords in order to craft an Alliance against the Beast Invaders. Alric is captured by Lord Vangarath when he visits him to prove he's still alive. Dunehelm Bellangere and Lady Tierna finally free him after a long battle and while doing so also quell the rebellion. Alric, convinced that Lord Keran is a betrayer, questions him in the great hall of the Council of Mages. Keran, seeing no way out of the situation, transforms into his horrifying Voidwalker form and quickly teleports away from the place.

He returns to the Underworld, only to find that the Ageless Ones are greatly disappointed by his failures, claiming that all the long years of careful planning and scheming were just a waste of time. The Ageless Ones order him to reunite the Fallen Swarms. Eagerly awaiting for a chance to show that he can still be of use, he takes the mission and successfully reestablishes control over the Hive Queens. Reaffirmed in Keran's abilities, he's ordered by the Ageless Ones to open the First Seal of Ruannon, which seals away the power of the Heart of the Void. He successfully gets to the Ice Cavern in Teonia, eliminating most of the Teonian Knights during his march.

Within the depths of the Ice Cavern he breaks the First Seal. He's granted a boon for his success, the Dark Dreamer, Overlord of his Homeworld decides to transform him into an Avatar of his will. In the meantime, Alric meets the Order of Ruannon, who claim to have a dark lore, to face the threat posed by Keran. Alric gains the aid of the Order of Ruannon, and two Disciples of Ruannon erect two Firewall which destroy any Fallen that pass through it, cornering the Fallen in the Ice Cave. During his transformation, Keran's forces defend him and he finishes his metamorphosis just in time. With his newfound power, he easily repels the Empire's attacks, and by passing through the Firewall, he proves that he has become immune to Ruannon's lore. He proceeds and kills the two Disciples, destroys the Firewalls and his army destroys all opposition.

He returns to the Underworld, but everything is changed, the Dark Dreamer's boon amuses the Ageless Ones and he takes firm leadership of the Fallen Swarm. While Vangarath is breaking the Second Seal, he heads directly to the Field of Sorrows, where the Beast and Empire armies are battling each other. By summoning forth the Beholder from the Dimensional Gates he easily annihilates them both and then Domina and two of her Matriarchs destroy the Third Seal. Killing off most of the magi of the Order of Ruannon who try to prevent the breaking of the Third Seal, he heads to the Chamber of Screams located nearby and with little to no effort undoes the trap that holds the Two Father of the Fallen captives.

Keran becomes overconfident and proclaims his and the Fallen's inevitably victory.

As an Alliance is forged between the Beast and Empire forces to face the Fallen threat, Keran orders Vangarath to keep this "marriage of fools" entertained, while he and the Two Fathers move to invade Wermona, capital of Noran in order to seize the Obsidian Tower and with it, the Heart of the Void. Although Keran succeeds in doing so, Vangarath fails and is killed by Alric and Dragga.

Alric and Dragga then march to the Obsidian Tower only to find that the ceremony of fusing this world into that of the fallen's has already begun. Dragga, ignoring Alric's warning rushes to the Heart of the Void and kills one of the Two Fathers, but is handcuffed to the floor by a powerful spell. Alric arrives and successfully eliminates the other Father and tries to destroy Keran himself as well. His powers, vastly alike to that of Ruannon's fail against Keran and Alric is killed, though not before dispelling Dragga's handcuffs, who then proceeds to destroy the Heart of the Void.

The story ends with Keran staring at the remains of the Heart of the Void, most probably unable to realize or accept his defeat.

His fate from that moment on is unknown.

Inquisitor Belloq

The leader of the Holy Legion, which is the most effective and well-equipped part of the Empire's army. He is jealous, vain and confident, as he keeps himself the most heroic army leader. He is such descended that he calls underworld demons into arms for his crusade's succession. He is finally killed by Tyron Gral's army for a stolen talisman.

Lord Vangarath

Formerly a lord of one of the Noran's counties, he rebels against the council and captures Alric. Alric is then freed by Dunehelm Bellangre and Lady Tierna.

Defeated, it is revealed that he is one of the Fallens' elite chanters, though he manages to escape. Vangarath, in contrast to Keran's manipulative and deceitful nature, is shown to have a more aggressive and direct-force personality.

Later on, he rediscovers a Dimensional Gate, which allows vastly more powerful creatures of their own dark plane of existence to enter this world. He's then ordered by the Ageless Ones to break the Second Seal of Ruannon. Compared to the First and Third Seals, he breaks the Second Seal with relative ease.

As an Alliance is forged between the Beast and Empire forces to face the Fallen threat, Keran orders Vangarath to keep this "marriage of fools" entertained, while he and the Two Fathers move to invade Wermona, capital of Noran in order to seize the Obsidian Tower and with it, the Heart of the Void. Although Keran succeeds in doing so, Vangarath fails and is killed by Alric and Dragga.

Princess Domina

Princess of the Dark Elves, a society of elves, banished under the ground. They evolved to match their new environment. They have light, pale skin and have turned to dark magics, particularly Necromancy. Decades after their banishment, Domina is a young princess of the Dark Elves and is at war with Lord Shaiton, who seeks to seize the Throne from her.

Keran meets her during his quest to seize the stolen Hive Queen from a group of Dark Elves.

Domina tells Keran of her aims and reveals that Shaiton abducted the Hive Queen in order to gain advantage over Domina and defeat her. Domina offers her help to recapture the Queen and asks Keran to, in return, kill Shaiton. Lord Keran accepts and a temporary alliance is forged.

Together they reclaim the Hive Queen and kill Shaidon.

Princess Domina

Domina then asks the Ageless Ones to let her join their campaign against the surface dwellers. She claims that she has the means to discover the location of the Three Seals, by seeking out Ruannon's soul and simply contact him, as she can speak the language of the dead. Having no better plan, the Ageless Ones give her a chance and control over the Hive Army.

By combining the Dark Elf and the Hive armies, she massacres the underground city of the dwarves and undoes the Stone Gate which seals the Underworld away from the land above.

She claims that it was the Elves, who imprisoned her race under the ground, and driven by great anger, kills a great number of Elves and converts them to an army of skeletal servants.

She then fights her way to the Tomb of Ruannon and summons the wizard's soul. Domina promises him to release his soul if he agrees to tell her the location of the seals, and Ruannon, without a second of hesitation agrees to comply.

Although she does not directly participate in battle for a long time from that point on, she does continue to send reinforcements to Lord Keran to help him in his quest for the First Seal, particularly the horrifying Avenger, towering abominations, who act as living siege weapons.

Later into the story she accompanies Keran to the Field of Sorrows, where Keran, after carefully examining the Seal, tells Domina that it is of elven magic, and it will take him a plenty of time to break it. Domina laughs at Keran and reminds him that she's of elven blood as well, and she can helps Keran break the Third Seal.

Keran claims that for her help, she'll be rewarded greatly by the Dark Dreamer. She successfully breaks the Seal and disappears from the story.

What happened to her after that is unknown.

Tyron Gral

The master chieftain of the Beast. He keeps himself a messiah as he receives visionic messages from the Ancient Spirits. He is cruel and harsh, even with his own people. There is no other reason for his life than annihilating the humans and the elves, no matter what it costs. He thinks that the existence of the Fallen is just a myth, so he doesn't deal with it. He is killed by the queen of the lizardmen because of his aggressive wills.

Dragga

Tyron's son, who is loyal to his father at first, but as he faces the threatening danger of the Fallen that Tyron doesn't deal with, he turns against him. He joins his forces with Alric and the Empire's forces to defeat the Fallen together. As his father dies, he becomes the new chieftain. At the end of the game, he kills the chanters who want to release the power of the Heart of the Void, including Lord Kerran.

Sseeth

The chieftain of the lizardmen, the old allies of the Beast. He is wise and he supports Dragga's will instead of Tyron.

== Reception ==
_{[±]}

The editors of Computer Gaming World nominated Armies of Exigo as their 2004 "Strategy Game of the Year (Real-Time)", although it lost to Warhammer 40,000: Dawn of War. According to Rob Fahey, a contributor for EuroGamer online magazine, "it's a clone of Warcraft III, presented with a nicer graphics engine and great production values". He rated the game 6 out of 10.
