= Solstice Chronicles: MIA =

2017 video game

- Developer: Ironward
- Writer: Hrvoje Horvatek
- Engine: Unreal Engine 4
- Platforms: Microsoft Windows; Nintendo Switch
- Genre: Twin-stick shooter
- Mode: single-player

Solstice Chronicles: MIA is an isometric sci-fi shooter video game, developed by Ironward and published by Nkidu Games inc. for Microsoft Windows. The game was released on July 26, 2017, on Steam. It is a spinoff of the previous game The Red Solstice. It is a twin-stick shooter, inspired by games such as Alien Shooter.

The story is described "In a dead colony, a corporate marine is left far behind enemy lines. With an unlikely help of an insurgent drone, he faces the battle for survival against an army of murderous, mindless mutants... and worse things".

The single-player campaign is focused on a marine called Grunt and his drone, stranded on the planet of Mars.

== Reception ==
The Red Solstice received mixed reviews upon release. The game currently holds 68% on Metacritic based on 12 reviews. The reviewing site GameCritics praised the game stating "Solstice Chronicles: MIA is a breath of fresh air in the twin-stick shooter genre. The threat system makes it feel like nothing else out there, transforming it from just another run-and-gun into something far more strategic and complex. It's not a complete success, but it manages to add a satisfying amount of strategy without skimping on the action, which is a feat that I'm shocked no one has managed before." On the other hand, ZTGD was less positive, criticizing the absence of co-op and the rough edges of the game, as well as the bad story line.
