= Black Hole Entertainment =

Hungarian video game developing company

- Industry: Video games
- Founded: 2001
- Defunct: July 2012
- Headquarters: Budapest, Hungary
- Owner: Cinergi Interactive (2003–2007)

Black Hole Entertainment (also known as Black Hole Games) was a Hungarian video game developer, founded in 2001 in Budapest by seven young game enthusiasts.

The company's first title was Armies of Exigo, developed with the financial backing of Andy Vajna, published by Electronic Arts and released in the end of 2004. The team has developed Warhammer: Mark of Chaos and Warhammer: Battle March, an expansion for Mark of Chaos, which were released on November 14, 2006 and September 16, 2008, respectively, for the PC. Warhammer: Battle March was also released for the Xbox 360 game console on September 2, 2008.

Black Hole developed the sixth installment of the Heroes of Might and Magic series, Might & Magic Heroes VI, in collaboration with Ubisoft. The title was released in October 2011, postponed from its original launch date of March. The studio was reported in various media to have gone bankrupt as a result of the nature of this development, and members of the company blamed Ubisoft for the mistake. As of July 2012, the company is no longer operating.

Many members works in Primal Game Studio, including cofounders Zoltan Zsuffa, Sandor Jakus, Tamas Sandor.

== Games developed ==
- Armies of Exigo - 2004
- Warhammer: Mark of Chaos - 2006
- Crazy Taxi: Fare Wars - 2007
- Warhammer: Battle March (expansion for Warhammer: Mark of Chaos) - 2008
- Might & Magic Heroes VI - October 2011
