= Elegy for a Dead World =

2014 video game

- Developers: Dejobaan Games; Popcannibal Games
- Publisher: Dejobaan Games
- Designers: Ichiro Lambe; Ziba Scott
- Engine: Unity
- Platforms: Microsoft Windows; Linux
- Release: WW: December 10, 2014
- Mode: Single-player

Elegy for a Dead World is a 2014 side-scrolling exploration game where the player writes a diary visible to other players. The player explores three worlds inspired by British romantic poets Shelley, Byron, and Keats. While exploring, the player makes notes on their observations. The notes are publicly visible via Steam Workshop. The collective note taking mechanic earned it an honorable mention for the Nuovo Award in the 2014 Independent Games Festival.

== Development ==
Developer Ziba Scott credits the theme of the game to his love for British romantic poetry. Shelley's world, for example, was inspired by Percy Bysshe Shelley's poem "Ozymandias". Developer Ichiro Lambe is exploring the intimacy created through collaborative writing.

== Reception ==
Reception

Aggregate score
Aggregator	Score
Metacritic	65/100

Review scores
Publication	Score
Eurogamer	7/10
GameRevolution	2.5/5
GameSpot	7/10
GamesTM	4/10
Hardcore Gamer	4/5
Softpedia	3/5

Early critical reception has focused on the novelty of the note taking mechanic, and the emphasis on narrative storytelling over action.

On Metacritic, the game holds a score of 65/100 based on 14 reviews, indicating "mixed or average reviews".

Hardcore Gamer gave the game a 4 out of 5, saying "Elegy for a Dead World may be a jarring departure from traditions, but unlike the more pretentious attempts at alternative gaming experiences we’ve seen in recent times, this is one idea that should be encouraged."
