= Total Annihilation =

1997 strategy video game

- Developer: Cavedog Entertainment
- Publishers: NA: Cavedog Entertainment; EU: GT Interactive
- Producer: Ron Gilbert
- Designer: Chris Taylor
- Artist: Clayton Kauzlaric
- Composer: Jeremy Soule
- Platforms: Microsoft Windows, Mac OS
- Release: UK: September 25, 1997; NA: September 27, 1997
- Genre: Real-time strategy
- Modes: Single-player, multiplayer

Total Annihilation is a science fiction real-time strategy video game released in September 1997 for Microsoft Windows and Mac OS by Cavedog Entertainment and distributed internationally by GT Interactive. Two expansion packs were released in 1998, The Core Contingency on April 29 and Battle Tactics on July 20, while a medieval-themed spin-off called Total Annihilation: Kingdoms was released on June 25, 1999.

Rights to the game passed to Infogrames (later Atari) following the 1999 acquisition and closure of Cavedog Entertainment's parent company, Humongous Entertainment. In July 2013, Wargaming bought the Total Annihilation franchise from Atari's bankruptcy proceedings.

Total Annihilation has been re-released on Steam and GOG, but is no longer actively supported. The creators of XTA, a mod for Total Annihilation, independently developed the open-source 3D graphics Spring game engine. The Total Annihilation 3D project began in 2006. Former lead designer Chris Taylor went on to found Gas Powered Games which created Supreme Commander in 2007, considered the "spiritual successor" of Total Annihilation.

== Gameplay ==
Total Annihilation is set in the far future in the midst of a galactic war, with battles taking place on the surface of planets and moons. The efforts of the player are centered on constructing a defensive base and an offensive force, and conquering opponents. The player is also concerned with gathering resources, reconnaissance and stealth, and evaluation of units and terrain. Battles take place against AI in a story-driven campaign, with the option of playing against other players in a skirmish mode.

When starting a new game, the player normally begins with a lone Commander. The Commander is a powerful and irreplaceable unit that has a number of unique abilities such as a destructor weapon that vaporizes anything it hits, the ability to use cloaking and become invisible, and the ability to travel through bodies of water. Construction is governed by the possession of the game's two unlimited resources, Metal and Energy, and can be undertaken by factories or mobile construction units. Every unit belongs to a level of technology (tech level); the higher the level, the more advanced the unit and the more resources and thus time required to construct it. A feature of the game is the ability to easily "queue" the many commands for a unit or group of units, with types of commands including patrolling a route, constructing a defensive group of structures and attacking enemy units. Once given its commands, the unit will go about them automatically thus minimizing the need for the player's attention to small, repetitive tasks. The victory conditions of a multiplayer game generally involve the elimination of all enemy units, but the aim of single player campaign missions can be more specialized.

An in-game screenshot of a Core base. Near the bottom-right corner the Commander (with the yellow backpack) is visible assisting a factory in construction.

=== Resources ===
Resources in Total Annihilation are handled in a manner different from other real-time strategy games of the day: they are "streaming", meaning that they are accumulated at a constant rate rather than in small batches; and they are limitless. In addition, all units and structures have a fixed cost, but they build at varying rates depending on the unit constructing them. A Commander, for example, will build a structure three times faster than a construction vehicle, but at a higher cost in energy. If the rate at which resources are used exceeds the rate at which resources are acquired, then the player's reserves will begin to be depleted. If a player's reserves are entirely depleted, the player's production across the board will slow to a rate proportional to the amount by which outflow exceeds income, this is known as "nanostalling". In addition, if the player runs out of energy, power-dependent structures such as radar towers, metal extractors, and laser towers will cease to function. This adds an element of economic complexity unparalleled in most RTS games of the time period. When a unit or structure is destroyed, it leaves behind wreckage that may be reclaimed for a lump sum of metal. Many terrain structures may also be reclaimed for their metal. Some maps also have plants or other organic structures that can be reclaimed for energy.

=== Combat ===
The player can command a variety of units including infantry bots, vehicles, ships, hovercraft, aircraft, powerful stationary long range weapons, and even a giant mecha known as the Core Krogoth. Units vary in size, speed and the ability to give and take damage, depending on their tech level. The strongest units take longer to build as well as cost more resources. Each unit has strengths and weaknesses, optimal styles of use, and corresponding units against which it is vulnerable or well-suited. Effective play is usually characterized by consideration of these attributes, as well as efficient resource management, strong defenses, and knowledge of the opponent's strategies. The game's interface consists of construction and command buttons (depending on the unit selected), unit status information, resource information on the production of Energy and Metal, and a minimap which gives an overview of the game's battlespace – the visibility of which may be hindered by fog of war, necessitating the use of radar or scout units. There are a few highly advanced units which are invaluable combat-wise, such as nuclear missile launchers which have enormous range and very high damage, as well as long-range artillery that have enough range to attack any point on smaller maps. There are two story-related factions, Arm and Core, which have comparable sets of units (one side a little bit faster, other one a little bit tougher etc.), but are aesthetically different. Generally, the Arm have faster, sleeker units while the Core units are built to take slightly more punishment. This is shown exceptionally well by the Arm being able to build an extremely fast Kbot known as the Zipper, while the Core can build an armored Kbot known simply as The Can. When playing amongst experienced players, subtle differences between the two factions put Core players at a disadvantage. The most noticeable differences are as follows: The level 1 Arm fighter aircraft is 1.7× more maneuverable than its Core counterpart, the Arm commander walks 1.12× faster than the Core commander, amphibious Arm Kbots float above water, making them faster and more useful than their submerging Core counterparts, Arm players can build Farks, fast assistant repair Kbots which can be crowded around labs and structures to dramatically reduce build times, and level 1 Arm tanks are equipped with superior weapons. Core has some distinct advantage as well, such as superior naval units, level 1 bombers that drop more bombs, and less conspicuous nuclear facilities. These advantages, however, are overshadowed by the Arm advantages in most situations.

Total Annihilation was one of the first RTS games to feature radar that showed enemy units within its radius on the minimap. This added an additional element of electronic warfare to the game: players could construct radar jammers that prevented units in a small radius around them from appearing on radar. Mobile radar jammers could be used to create surprise attacks, necessitating the deployment of scout units on a regular basis to reveal said units visually. In addition, radar jammers could disguise the presence of visually cloaked units, such as the commander or land mines. Radar fields rendered cloaked units detectable; a radar jammer could make said units undetectable until the radar jammer was destroyed. Total Annihilation was also one of the first RTS games to point the way towards battlefields with hundreds and thousands of units. Previous games could field a hundred units or so. Total Annihilation initially permitted 250 units per side which was later patched to 500. A third party patch allowed up to 5,000 units per side.

=== Physics ===
The game features a physics engine which governs projectiles, explosions and wreckage. The terrain is displayed as a 2D raster image but contains height values that allow it to act as a 3D surface. Hills obstruct artillery fire, and, depending on the "line-of-sight" setting, height enhances units' visual and firing ranges. If terrain is steep and jagged, units tilt and turn to meet the face of the ground, slowing down or speeding up in accordance with gravity. Structures can be built on steep terrain to protect them from artillery fire and to create choke points. The wind, tides, and gravity on different maps also vary; some maps have strong wind gusts and are more suited for gathering energy via windmills. Plant life is often flammable and can be set on fire by shooting it.

=== Maps ===
The game features a number of terrain and tile sets. These represent several different planets that the war between the Arm and Core is being waged on, and contain various unique characteristics. The Core's home world, Core Prime, consists of inorganic metal structures and inky black seas. Since everything is made of metal, the player has unlimited access to this resource and can afford to build armies and bases more rapidly than on most other worlds. Other maps include the Arm's home planet, a grassy green area of forests, hills, and blue water, a barren desert world with rocks and mesas, a Martian landscape, a sandy planet with beaches and blue oceans, a volcanic world with lava instead of water, an ice planet, and more.

Many maps contain lakes or oceans; these are impassable by most land units and will require ships or aircraft to reach different landmasses. Certain land units can travel underwater, but in doing so may be attacked by enemy ships and not be able to fight back. Other maps contain lava or acid which is completely impassable except by aircraft.

== Plot ==
The game's start-up credits give a summary of the game's narrative:

"What began as a conflict over the transfer of consciousness from flesh to machines escalated into a war which has decimated a million worlds. The Core and the Arm have all but exhausted the resources of a galaxy in their struggle for domination. Both sides now crippled beyond repair, the remnants of their armies continue to battle on ravaged planets, their hatred fueled by over four thousand years of total war. This is a fight to the death. For each side, the only acceptable outcome is the complete elimination of the other."

Screenshot of an Arm campaign mission. The interface is visible along the top and left sides, displaying resource, minimap, construction and movement information.

In the far future the galaxy is ruled by a benevolent central government of humans and artificially intelligent machines called the Core. The Core's technological and economic triumphs have allowed humanity to colonize most of the Milky Way and enjoy a golden age of peace and prosperity. However, the peace is shattered by a technological breakthrough dubbed patterning, which allows the consciousness of a living human being to be reliably transferred into a machine, thereby granting a theoretically indefinite lifespan safe from disease, ageing, and pain.

Following a mandate imposed by the Core requiring all humans undergo patterning as a public health measure, a rebellion ensued among those who refused to abandon their natural bodies to join the Core's transition to an entirely machine society. Fleeing the developed Core worlds, the rebels established themselves in the remote rimward regions of the galaxy, coming to be known as the Arm. As hostilities escalated, the Core began duplicating their greatest military minds to mass-produce sentient war machines, and the Arm countered this buildup with a campaign of cloning bioengineered pilots for theirs; a war that would last four thousand years began.

Clayton Kauzlaric, the lead artist on Total Annihilation, stated on his blog that the backstory was inspired by the novels Feersum Endjinn by Iain Banks, and Permutation City by Greg Egan.

The game's two campaigns focus on their respective sides' last remaining military leaders, their Commanders. Each Commander pilots a towering, bipedal battlemech bearing an arsenal of weapons, a powerful antimatter reactor, and enough advanced nanotechnology to enable a single Commander to fabricate an entire planetary invasion force on-site. The story of either the Core or the Arm campaign starts with an effort to defend the faction's homeworld from a decisive sneak-attack and initiate a turning point in the overall war. The player then fights a series of battles on a number of planets and moons, linked through a series of faster-than-light Galactic Gates. These Gates are complex to engineer and require extravagant energy resources to operate, so FTL invasions typically consist of a sole Commander who proceeds alone or with only minimal escort, and bootstraps a military-industrial infrastructure on the far end. However, the element of surprise gained by the rapidity of these invasions has been sufficient to turn the tide of the war.

As the player progresses, more units become available for construction, either through the course of the story or upon completion of a mission centered on the unit in question. Mission objectives include protecting a vital structure or area, eliminating all enemy units, capturing a pivotal enemy unit, or seizing a Galactic Gate. The worlds upon which the player wages warfare force the player to adapt to different strategies; for example, deployment on a world whose surface is entirely composed of archipelagos necessitates the construction of an effective navy. Some have salient meteorological conditions, such as low variable elevation and high wind speeds, making wind power extremely economical; while others lack an atmosphere, rendering certain forms of aeronautics unusable; dangerous electromagnetic storms or meteor showers occur on others. Once highly urbanised planets lack major crustal metal deposits, these having been long-ago mined out, and instead mass must be actively reclaimed from the ruins of destroyed cities. Both campaigns include 25 missions, the final mission ending the war with a final strike on the enemy's homeworld – either the Arm's bucolic Empyrrean or the Core's artificial Jupiter Brain world of Core Prime.

== Expansions ==
=== Downloadable content ===
Starting in 1997 Cavedog began offering additional free downloadable content for Total Annihilation, adding new units, maps, and scenarios over time.

=== The Core Contingency ===
Cavedog released The Core Contingency a year after the release of Total Annihilation. It features 25 new missions as well as 75 new units. It continues the story after the ending of the Arm campaign. The expansion also comes with the Total Annihilation editor, which allows users to create maps and missions.

=== Battle Tactics ===
A month after The Core Contingency, Battle Tactics was released, which includes four new units, 100 additional missions as well an experimental approach to Total Annihilation gameplay, with less emphasis on base construction.

=== Engine remakes ===
Spring Engine is an open source General Public License engine made for real time strategy games and features games based on Total Annihilation. The engine is multi-platform and features lua scripting to make almost every aspect of the engine customizable. It features online, lan and offline playing.

Total Annihilation 3D is a fan-made 3D real-time strategy game engine created with the purpose of directly moving Total Annihilation over to a three dimensional plane. The engine has a Microsoft Windows and Linux version, and is programmed in OpenGL and C++. While the engines focus is to recreate the engine and gameplay of Total Annihilation, the engine supports a range of mods. TA3D uses Total Annihilation's Original 3D game assets. TA3D is created under the General Public License (GPL).

Robot War Engine is an open-source real-time strategy game engine that is "highly compatible with TA data files". It is intended to replicate what Total Annihilation does with the original game data, but without some of the limits that Total Annihilation has. As of 2019, RWE had progressed through several stages.

Nanolathe is an open source MIT-licensed engine remake that loads the original game assets and runs on Windows, Mac, and Linux. It supports single player, multiplayer, and mods. It is written in Go and provides an updated GPU renderer with new effects and runtime remastering of terrain and feature sprites, as well as adding a new survival game mode.

Byte Tactics is a matching decompilation project which recovered the original engine source code through executable decompilation. Using the same Visual C++ 5.0 compiler and libraries used by Cavedog when building TotalA.exe, this project produces the same exact output bytes, providing a base on which to build modified engine behaviors.

== Soundtrack ==
The game has an original orchestral soundtrack composed by Jeremy Soule and performed by the 95-piece Northwest Sinfonia orchestra. The music changes according to events: during a battle, louder and more frantic music plays. During post-battle damage repair or idle construction, a more ambient and mysterious track is played. The game disc includes the original soundtrack in CD-audio format, which can be played on standard CD players. An ordinary music CD can be inserted once the game is under way and can replace the original game music with its own tracks. It is even possible to program such custom CD tracks to the various battlefield situations (conflict, construction, defeat, etc.) like the default set.

== Reception ==
=== Sales ===
Total Annihilation received a global marketing effort at launch, and was concurrently released in 14 countries with English, French and German localizations. In the United States, it debuted at #19 on PC Data's computer game sales chart for September 1997. It rose to 15th place the following month, at an average retail price of $48, but was absent from PC Data's top 20 by November. Shipments to retailers worldwide had reached 250,000 units by the end of October, and an analyst for Merrill Lynch noted that the game was performing well by the start of December, which she felt was a positive sign for GT Interactive's financial recovery at the time. Total Annihilation ultimately sold-through 83,900 copies in the United States by the end of 1997, according to PC Data. PC Gamer US reported that this performance set it behind rival Age of Empires over the same period, but ahead of Activision's Dark Reign: The Future of War.

Geoff Keighley later wrote, "Cavedog will not release specific sales figures for the game [... but] best estimates from insiders place the sales at well in excess of half a million copies". It sold over 1.5 million copies by 2002.

=== Critical reviews ===
Reception

Aggregate scores
Aggregator	Score
GameRankings	89%
Metacritic	86/100

The game was highly praised by critics, and won numerous awards, including GameSpot's Game of the Year Award for 1997. It won GameSpy's Top Ten Real-Time Strategy Games of All Time in 2004, leaving StarCraft in second place. It was also named in GameSpot's 50-game The Greatest Games of All Time list in 2010. The editors stated "It's not as famous as Warcraft or Command & Conquer, but Total Annihilation is arguably better than any other real-time strategy game to date." Overall, Total Annihilation received aggregated scores of 86 out of 100 from Metacritic and 89% from GameRankings.

Next Generation reviewed the PC version of the game, rating it four stars out of five, and stated that "Total Annihilation will certainly reign as king of the realtime strategies, at least for now. It's expandable, and if the marketing hype proves true, new abilities for the units should get added in by both expansion packs and downloadable patches. So if you're looking for something that doesn't mimic C&C to a fault but gives you a lot of realtime challenge and variation, this is the place to go." GamePro said it "stands out by providing a deep challenge and excellent replay value." Like Next Generation, they expressed excitement over the promised updates, also praising the line-of-sight features and soundtrack, though they found the unit A.I. demands close supervision from the player.

Total Annihilation was a finalist for "PC Strategy Game of the Year" during the AIAS' inaugural Interactive Achievement Awards, which ultimately went to StarCraft and Age of Empires (in a tie). Total Annihilation was a runner-up for Computer Gaming World's 1997 "Strategy Game of the Year" award, which ultimately went to Myth: The Fallen Lords.

In 1999, Next Generation listed Total Annihilation as number 49 on their "Top 50 Games of All Time", commenting that, "Unique innovations such as the field commander, unit waypoints, and true line of sight based on elevation enabled a new level of depth in an overcrowded genre, and made Total Annihilation a standout in the great glut of realtime strategies."

=== Awards ===
Total Annihilation has won several awards, including:

- The number one Real-Time Strategy Game of all time, GameSpy 2004
- 1997 Game of the Year, GameSpot
- Best Strategy Game of 1997, GameSpot
- Best Multiplayer Game 1997, GameSpot
- Best Music 1997, GameSpot
- Included in "The Greatest Games of All Time", GameSpot

== Reviews ==
- The Duelist #31
- Backstab #6

== See also ==
- Dark Reign: The Future of War, released around the same time
- Dark Colony
