= John Patrick Lowrie =

American voice actor

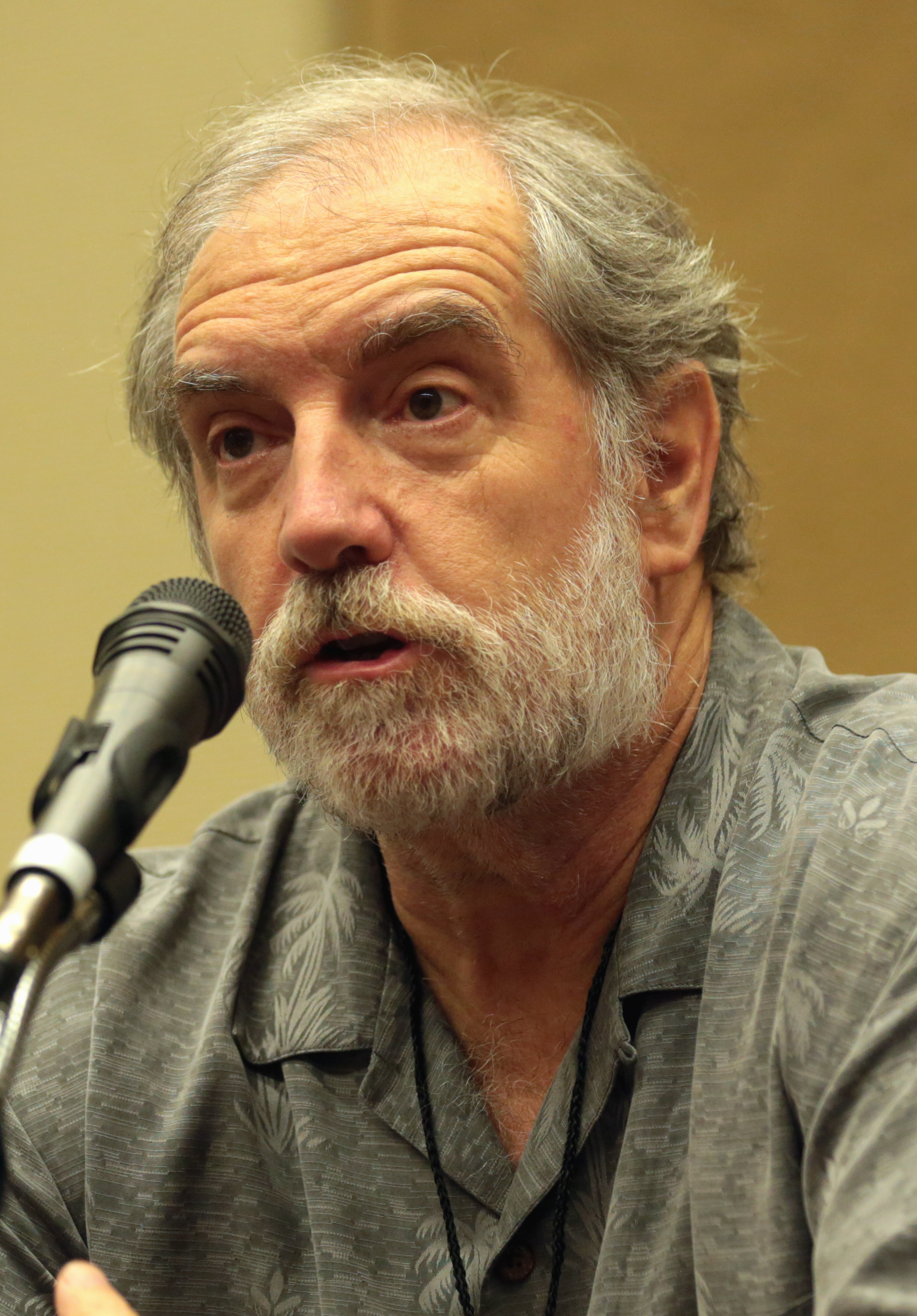
- Lowrie at the 2017 Game On Expo
- Born: June 28, 1952 (age 74); Honolulu, Hawaii, U.S.
- Education: Indiana University, Bloomington (PhD; dropped out)
- Occupation: Voice actor
- Years active: 1997–present
- Spouse: Ellen McLain (m. 1986)

John Patrick Lowrie (born June 28, 1952) is an American voice actor best known for voicing the Sniper in Team Fortress 2 and various characters in Dota 2. He has played Sherlock Holmes in the radio series The Further Adventures of Sherlock Holmes since 2001.

== Career ==
Lowrie was a musician in his 20s, touring the United States as a part of The Keith-Lowrie Duet, which opened for acts like Buddy Rich. At the age of 31, he played the banjo in the pit orchestra on the European tour of the musical Show Boat. After noticing the actors made more money than him, Lowrie auditioned to understudy for the role of Captain Andy, and debuted on stage in Palermo, Italy, which became his first paid acting gig. After returning to the United States and moving in with his wife, Ellen McLain, in New York City, he turned down a role in a European tour of West Side Story to stay with McLain. He then studied for a Ph.D. in Music Composition at the Indiana University School of Music for two years before dropping out to pursue acting in Seattle with McLain.

Lowrie began voice acting for video games in the early 1990s, and has performed roles in games such as The Suffering and The Suffering: Ties That Bind, Total Annihilation and its expansions, The Operative: No One Lives Forever and No One Lives Forever 2: A Spy in H.A.R.M.'s Way. Lowrie is mostly recognized for his voice acting in Valve Corporation games such as Team Fortress 2, Half-Life 2, Half-Life 2: Episode One, Half-Life 2: Episode Two, Left 4 Dead, Dota 2, Artifact and Deadlock.

He is noted for playing the roles of the Sniper in the online first-person shooter game Team Fortress 2, Agent Gray in the MMORPG The Matrix Online, as well as Odessa Cubbage and the male citizens in Half-Life 2.

Lowrie has played Sherlock Holmes in the radio drama series The Further Adventures of Sherlock Holmes on the program Imagination Theatre since 2001. He also voiced Holmes in the program's related radio series The Classic Adventures of Sherlock Holmes. He and Lawrence Albert, who voices Dr. Watson on the program, are the longest-running audio Holmes and Watson team in American radio history.

In 2011, he published a science fiction novel titled Dancing with Eternity. An audiobook version narrated by Lowrie and McLain was released in April 2014.

In 2021, Lowrie directed a livestreamed version of the play 'night, Mother starring his wife Ellen McLain and Sheila Houlahan on the online platform Twitch with the story adapted by McLain within the context of the COVID-19 pandemic. The filmed online play is performed through an online face-to-face chat with the screen split between McLain's and Houlahan's screens, occasionally interrupted by cuts to pre-filmed footage relevant to the story.

Lowrie has also had small roles in several live-action films, most notable of which being the 2025 critically acclaimed period drama Train Dreams as a foreman overlooking the construction of a railroad for the Spokane International Railway (credited as Mr. Sears).

== Personal life ==
Lowrie's adolescence was spent in Boulder, Colorado, where he attended various high schools briefly before joining the United States Navy.

He first met his wife Ellen McLain in 1984 in Arnhem, Netherlands, during the European tour of Show Boat, which McLain starred in. They returned to the United States, where they married and moved in together, initially in New York City. They then spent two years in Indiana, before they finally settled in Seattle to pursue acting. Lowrie has since voiced characters alongside McLain in Team Fortress 2, Half-Life 2, and Dota 2.

== Works ==
=== Video games ===
Year	Title	Role	Notes
1997	Betrayal in Antara	Tyre, Enkudi, Mackey	
1997	Spy Fox in "Dry Cereal"	Artimice J. Bigpig	First video game role
1997	Total Annihilation	Narrator	
1998	Total Annihilation: The Core Contingency	Narrator	
1998	Total Annihilation: Battle Tactics	Narrator	
1998	Police Quest: SWAT 2	Tammany, Officer, Security Guard, Hostage	
2000	The Operative: No One Lives Forever	Bruno Lawrie	
2002	No One Lives Forever 2: A Spy in H.A.R.M.'s Way	Bruno Lawrie	
2004	The Suffering	Guard	
2004	Half-Life 2	Odessa Cubbage, Male citizens	
2005	The Matrix Online	Agent Gray	
2005	FATE	Narrator	
2005	The Suffering: Ties That Bind	The Man	
2006	Half-Life 2: Episode One	Male citizens	
2007	Half-Life 2: Episode Two	Griggs / Male citizens	
2007	Team Fortress 2	Sniper	
2008	Left 4 Dead	John Slater	
2009	F.E.A.R. 2: Project Origin	Harold Keegan	
2009	inFamous	Warden Harms	
2009	Halo 3: ODST	Kinsler / SWAT Commander	
2010	Halo: Reach	Sword Control	
2011	The Lord of the Rings: War in the North	Beleram	
2013	Dota 2	Ancient Apparition, Dark Seer, Doom, Earthshaker, Pudge, Shadow Fiend, Storm Spirit, Voice of the International Announcer	
2013	Planetary Annihilation	Narrator	
2018	Artifact	Dark Seer, Earthshaker, Storm Spirit, Shadow Fiend	
2019	The Church in the Darkness	Isaac Walker	
2022	SpaceVenture	Holotube, Nurb, Habanero	
TBA	Deadlock	Dynamo	

=== Animation ===
Year	Title	Role	Notes
2008	Meet the Sniper	Sniper	Animated Team Fortress 2 short

=== Live-action film ===
Year	Title	Role	Notes
2003	A Relative Thing	The Lawyer	
2005	The Unknown	Mayor Potts	
2020	Language Arts	Bike Shopper	
2025	Train Dreams	Mr. Sears	Adaptation of the 2011 novella of the same name

=== Web ===
Year	Title	Role	Notes
2021	Night, Mother	Director	Livestreamed adaptation of the play 'night, Mother on Twitch.

=== Books ===
- Lowrie, John Patrick (2011). Dancing with Eternity. Seattle, Washington: Camel Press. ISBN 9781603818100.
