= Richard Rouse =

Richard Rouse may refer to:

- Richard Rouse III, American video game designer
- Richard Rouse (Australian colonial settler) (1774–1852), Australian colonial public servant and settler
- Richard Rouse (politician) (1842–1903), Australian politician and horse breeder
