= The Suffering (video game) =

2004 video game

- North American cover art
- Developer: Surreal Software
- Publisher: Midway Games
- Director: Alan Patmore
- Producer: Nick Radovich
- Designer: Richard Rouse III
- Programmers: Stuart Denman; Patrick Betremieux
- Artists: Mike Nichols; Jerusha Hardman
- Writer: Richard Rouse III
- Composer: Erik Aho
- Engine: Riot Engine
- Platforms: PlayStation 2; Xbox; Windows
- Release: PlayStation 2, Xbox: NA: March 8, 2004; EU: May 14, 2004; Windows: NA: June 7, 2004; EU: July 30, 2004
- Genres: First-person shooter, third-person shooter, survival horror
- Mode: Single-player

The Suffering is a first-person/third-person shooter horror video game developed by Surreal Software for PlayStation 2, Xbox and Microsoft Windows. Stan Winston studios helped with the game's design. The game was published by Midway Games for PlayStation 2 and Xbox. The PC version was published by Encore in North America and by Zoo Digital Publishing in Europe. In North America, the game was released for the PlayStation 2 and Xbox in March 2004, and for PC in June of the same year. In Europe, it was released for the PlayStation 2 and Xbox in May, and for PC in July. A port was also planned for the GameCube, but was cancelled.

The Suffering centers on the story of Torque, a prisoner on death row for murdering his ex-wife and two children, a crime that he possesses no memory of committing. Shortly after he arrives in Abbot State Penitentiary on Carnate Island, off the coast of Maryland, an earthquake hits the island, resulting in the prison being attacked by supernatural threats from the island's past. After being freed, Torque attempts to fight his way to freedom while confronting his own personal demons, all while attempting to remember what really happened to his family. The game features three endings which depend on the players' gameplay choices throughout, each of which reveals a different version of the murder of Torque's family.

The Suffering received primarily positive reviews. Some critics felt the blend of action with horror didn't work, and that the game was not sufficiently scary, although game designer Richard Rouse III has stated several times that the game is "action horror" as opposed to "survival horror" like Resident Evil, Silent Hill and Fatal Frame. Many also lauded the creature design, the tone, and the game's morality system, which determines both the ending and how certain characters interact with Torque during the game. The Suffering was a commercial success, selling over 1.5 million units worldwide across all platforms. In 2005, a sequel was released, The Suffering: Ties That Bind. In 2017, the game was digitally released by Warner Bros. Interactive Entertainment, which owns Midway Games' assets after their bankruptcy in 2009.

== Gameplay ==
The Suffering is an action game in which the player controls Torque, the player character, from either a first-person or third-person perspective, depending on their preference. The game is fully playable in both first and third-person views, with all actions available in both modes. Torque can run, shoot, jump, interact with the environment, interact with NPCs, and use items, such as flashlights, flares, flash grenades, TNT, shrapnel grenades, and molotov cocktails. Weaponry includes a shiv, an axe, a .357 revolver, a Thompson SMG, dual revolvers, a shotgun, an improvised flamethrower, and M2 Brownings. Other items which can be found during the game are Xombium tablets (which restores the player's health), paperwork with story content, maps, ammunition, and flashlight batteries.

Most of the enemies in the game are representative of the different types of execution methods that have taken place on Carnate Island. Slayers represent decapitation, Marksmen represent death by firing squad, Mainliners represent lethal injection, Noosemen represent hanging, and Burrowers represent being buried alive. Other creatures represent events from Carnate's history. Festers are the reincarnation of slave traders who ran their slave ship aground on Carnate, and left their slaves tied up in the hold to be eaten by rats, rather than freeing them. Infernas are the trapped spirits of three children who accused eleven innocent people of being witches during the time of a Puritan settlement on the island. The eleven people were burnt alive. Interestingly these monsters, when not killing humans, are frequently seen fighting and killing each other.

Basic gameplay in The Suffering showing the HUD in third-person mode. Torque's health and insanity meter are on the bottom left. On the bottom right are, from top to bottom, his Xombium bottles, flashlight batteries, projectile weapon count, and ammo count.

As Torque kills enemies during the game, an on-screen meter called his "insanity meter" begins to fill. Once it is full, it begins to flash, and at this point, Torque can transform into a monster. In this form, Torque can tear enemies apart and can perform several powerful attacks. The more enemies Torque kills whilst in this form, the more powerful the monster becomes and the more combo moves become available. However, when in this form, Torque's health depletes, and if he doesn't change back to his human form prior to his health meter fully depleting, he will die.

A major part of the gameplay in The Suffering concerns Torque's morality. At numerous points during the game, the player will encounter situations where they have several choices as to how to proceed. These situations involve NPCs, and the choices are usually to help the person (good morality), kill them (bad morality), or ignore them (neutral morality). In many situations, when Torque first encounters an NPC, the player will hear the voice of Torque's dead wife urging him to help them, and almost immediately afterwards will hear the voice of his inner demon urging him to kill them. How Torque's actions affect his morality is usually indicated by the reaction of his wife, who will praise him if he commits a good act and chastise him if he does something evil. Often, when Torque saves an NPC, they fight alongside him for a time, and can die during gameplay by either Torque's doing or the enemies. However, not every choice presents the player with all three possibilities. For example, when Torque finds the controls to the electric chair, he can turn the chair on to torture an inmate strapped to it (bad morality), or simply ignore the controls (neutral morality). There is no good morality choice available here. Another example is when Torque finds a guard who has had his limbs removed and is slowly dying. He can kill the man to relieve him of his misery (good morality), or ignore him (neutral morality). Here, there is no bad morality choice. Over the course of the game, the decisions made concerning Torque's morality cumulate, and the player will get one of three endings based on Torque's final morality level. The player can get a rough idea of Torque's morality level by both Torque's own physical appearance (good acts make him appear healthier, evil acts make him appear less human) and by looking at a family photograph which he carries with him at all times; the cleaner the photo, the purer his morality. If the photo is dirty, crumpled and covered in blood, his morality is moving towards evil.

== Plot ==
The game begins as silent protagonist Torque is being escorted by CO Ernesto Alvarez (voiced by Mark Dias) onto death row in Abbott State Penitentiary on Carnate Island, off the coast of Maryland, an island with a long and troubled history. Torque has been sentenced to death for murdering his ex-wife and their two children, although he claims to have blacked out during the incident, and can remember nothing. Shortly after entering his cell, an earthquake rocks the prison, and moments later, all of the inmates on death row except Torque are killed by Malefactors, a grotesque race of supernatural creatures manifested from various forms of deaths that took place on Carnate Island and are bent on purging any life they run into. One of the creatures opens Torque's cell, and he sets out to escape. After seeing several guards killed by the creatures, Torque uses security monitors to find the entire prison is under attack. He then gets a phone call from his dead wife, Carmen (Rafeedah Keys), telling him the island is more than a prison, that it brings out evil in everyone, and advising him to escape as soon as he can.

Descending to the basement, he soon encounters the spirits of three of Abbot's most famous occupants. Dr. Killjoy (voiced by John Armstrong) was a psychiatrist/surgeon who ran an insane asylum on the island in the 1920s. Obsessed with discovering what is wrong with Torque, Killjoy appears as an image projected from 16 mm film projectors. Hermes T. Haight (John Patrick Lowrie) was the executioner in Abbot for twenty-seven years, before he committed suicide in the gas chamber. He appears as a green vapor formed into the shape of a human. Hermes is determined to drive Torque into unleashing the evil inside him. Horace P. Gauge (John Armstrong) was an inmate who was executed in the electric chair for murdering his wife during a conjugal visit. Full of guilt for his actions, he claims Carnate drove him to it, and wants to help Torque realize his decency. He appears in the form of electricity. They teach Torque how to unleash the anger inside himself and transform into a powerful monster, although the transformation is only in Torque's mind.

Torque then encounters a fellow inmate, Dallas (Mark Berry), who he knows from his previous prison, Eastern Correctional Institution. They head through the eastern cellblock, where Torque has a vision of Carmen, who explains why she left him; when he was incarcerated for the second time, she knew she needed to make a change to her life. Torque and Dallas make it to the loading bay, and Torque heads to the control room, opening the doors, and allowing Dallas to escape. However, a fire starts, preventing Torque from following. He then hears a call from Consuela Alvarez (Meg Savlov), Ernesto's wife, asking Ernesto to call her. She tells him that she and the girls are fine, but there is a fire in the nearby forest getting closer to their house.

Torque heads to the western cellblock, where he has another vision of Carmen, telling him she is pregnant but is filing for divorce. Torque heads to the radio room, finding the radio is working, but something from the asylum is preventing communication with the mainland. Torque heads to the asylum, and encounters Killjoy, who is determined to "cure" him using his "Rebirth Machine". Torque fights through a series of tests set by Killjoy before destroying all his projectors. Killjoy then tells Torque to return to the prison, where he will give him his diagnosis.

Torque heads back to Abbot by way of the beach, where he encounters Clem (Ross Douglas), an elderly inmate who was in the middle of an escape when the earthquake struck. Clem has a small one-person boat ready to sail, but needs Torque's help fighting creatures emerging from a wrecked slave ship before he can leave. Torque sets fire to the wreck, enabling Clem to escape. He enters Abbot's sewer system where he encounters Horace, who tells him Abbot wants his soul. He then heads to the electric chair, destroying it and releasing Horace's spirit. Returning to death row, he finds Killjoy's diagnosis, and then returns to the radio room. Successfully sending a signal, he learns a Coast Guard vessel is on the way. However, Carnate's lighthouse is not working, and must be reactivated before the vessel can approach the island. Torque heads to the lighthouse, passing through the old military barracks, Fort Maleson. In the fort, he encounters Hermes, who forces him to fight. Torque defeats him by using pressurized gas to push Hermes into a furnace. He continues to the lighthouse, outside of which he meets Ernesto, who is trying to find his family. They restore power, and reactivate the lighthouse, arranging to meet the ship at the dock.

They then head to the nearby village to look for Ernesto's family. The gate to town is locked, but in return for freeing his soul, Horace opens it. They then encounter a broken bridge, but, impressed with Torque's efforts to kill him, Hermes helps them cross. As they near the village, however, they are separated by a fire, and Ernesto goes on alone, telling Torque to get to the docks. As he arrives, he encounters Killjoy, who tells him to cure himself he must face what awaits him, and only by using the Rebirth Machine can he defeat it. Torque heads to the docks where he encounters a massive creature with a miniature version of himself protruding from its stomach. Torque fights and defeats the creature while remembering the truth about his wife and children's deaths, leading to one of three endings, depending on the player's actions through the game:

- Good ending: Torque remembers that his wife and children were killed while he was spared by two criminals under orders of a third individual called "The Colonel", who also incriminated Torque in order to make him suffer. Torque heads to the docks and is picked up by the Coast Guard. On the boat, the captain recognizes him, and reveals that his case has been reopened after the prosecutor was indicted, and Torque will likely have a retrial. The game ends with the boat sailing away from Carnate.
- Neutral ending: Torque remembers that he accidentally killed his wife during an argument, and, out of revenge, his eldest son drowned his younger brother before killing himself. When the Coast Guard arrives, Torque knocks the captain out and commandeers the boat, sailing away from Carnate.
- Bad ending: Torque remembers that he was the one who killed his family after all. When the Coast Guard arrives, Torque transforms into his monster state and kills the captain, before running back into the woods of Carnate.

== Development ==
=== Story and influences ===
"I see The Suffering as somewhat unique among console action-adventure or shooter games in the seriousness of its subject matter and the moral themes it endeavors to explore. This is something that I wanted from day one and I am fairly happy with the result we achieved. To accomplish this, we made a number of key design decisions, from the player's ability to effect the world in a believable way (killing friendly humans), to the storytelling techniques we used, to the morality system that leads to the distinct endings. In the end though, the compatibility of a game about human atrocities over the ages within the "gory shooter" game milieu was perhaps our biggest limitation. As games seek to engage the player with more and more serious subject matter, the game mechanics need to evolve along with them, giving the player a wider expressive range than deciding whether to kill or not to kill. But as they say, Rome wasn't built in a day."

— Richard Rouse III; lead designer/writer

The origins of The Suffering date back to early 2002 when the game was originally called "Unspeakable". Surreal Software game designer Richard Rouse III wrote a two-page pitch, which described the game as "a stylized horror shooter; with the frenetic gameplay of Devil May Cry meets the horror setting of Resident Evil and the immersive game-world of Half-Life." The basic design for the game originated from Rouse's negative experiences working on a western role-playing game called Gunslinger, which was eventually cancelled. Rouse felt Gunslinger had been too ambitious for its own good, especially a "morality system" which saw entire towns full of people react differently to the player character depending on what actions the player had taken earlier in the game. Finding this system impossible to implement effectively, Rouse envisioned The Suffering as having a "drastically stripped down morality system" with a much simpler AI system for tracking it.

In looking for early inspiration for the game, the developers turned to horror films, with the team universally agreeing that their favorite such film was Stanley Kubrick's The Shining. According to Rouse,

The Shining was the movie that stood out for everyone as something that was deeply horrific, yet not cheesy or ridiculous. A serious piece that is also intensely frightening. So we really wanted to create that same feeling of you're walking through an environment, and then you're seeing visions of things that you don't necessarily understand straight away, but over the course of the whole game will come to create a full picture of one man's tortured soul.

The influence of The Shining, and other horror films, also influenced how the developers handled the basic storyline, especially Torque's backstory;

We used a slow motion blur effect to convey events from Torque's past and the history of the island. Inspired by some of the imagery from Stanley Kubrick's The Shining, this technique was our most innovative and also proved to be fairly frightening [...] the story is kept mysterious enough that players will still be left with numerous unanswered questions. My hope is that players will fill in the blanks with their own imagination, following the tradition of great horror films such as The Birds, The Shining, The Blair Witch Project, and The Ring.

=== Gameplay and design ===
An early decision on Rouse's part was that The Suffering be more of an action game than a traditional survival horror. This had implications for much of the design work on the game, as "it meant we were going to focus more on combat and avoid the long cutscenes, frail central characters, clumsy controls, fixed camera angles, and sparse ammo of many console horror games." Another early decision was to keep the central character as much of a mystery as possible, implying only his strength and little else. Artist Mike Nichols says, "We didn't really want a character that looked of any particular nationality or race. He really is almost Neanderthal in appearance. He's very primal. We wanted that strength to come through."

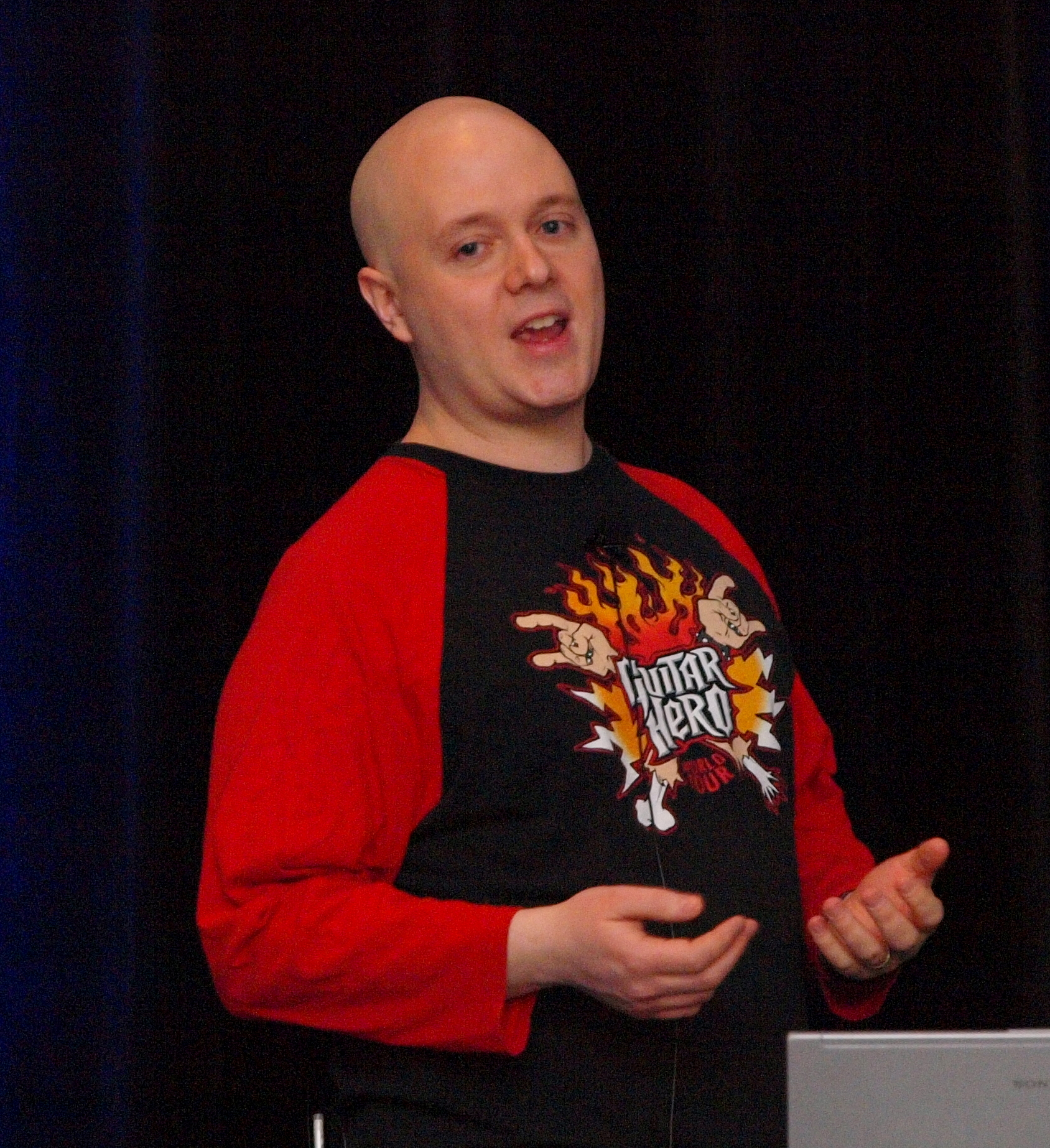
Richard Rouse III, writer and lead designer of The Suffering

Creature design was also an important element in the development process, with the team determined to create a unique array of enemies. According to Rouse,

from the beginning, we wanted to stay away from zombies and the more tired horror clichés that everyone's had enough of, and wanted to move onto something that was more disturbing and more unique to this experience. It was also early on we decided we wanted to have a theme for all the creatures. So instead, they weren't just this random monster or this random aberration, instead they're each themed after different execution methods that tie into the history of Carnate and all the various forms of execution of humans that have gone on there.

After the team had done their initial creature design for the game, they sent their work to Stan Winston Studios, where Terry Wolfinger took the preexisting designs and finessed them, changed colors, added details etc. to make them more unsettling, referred to as "Stan Winstonizing them." However, it was also important that the creatures, and the game as a whole, have a real world basis, so as to enhance the horror. Rouse explains,

to have a disturbing and unsettling tone we knew that creepy monsters alone would not be enough. Therefore we wanted to tie into real-world horrific events. Thus the storyline is suffused with the darkest elements of American history, including prison life and culture, slavery, racism, unethical medical experimentation, mob-mentality executions, and the death penalty. This is fairly serious subject matter for a videogame, particularly an action-adventure, and it amplified the horror of our world tremendously.

=== Game mechanics ===
An important element in the design process was what Rouse refers to as "player-empowerment;" allowing players a great deal of freedom within the game world. A key concept in this was that the player's actions would work to determine the guilt or innocence of Torque;

Players would be allowed to make important choices about how they act in the game world, thus tying into our morality system. Through these important choices, the player is able to determine the main character Torque's guilt or innocence of the crime that landed him in prison. We felt this was our strongest element of player empowerment, allowing players to determine not only Torque's future but also his past, something altogether unique in games.

A great deal of time was also spent working out the control scheme. The game originally had a target-lock system, based on the controls in Syphon Filter and Devil May Cry. However, the developers were unhappy with this system as they felt the gameplay was based more on "PC-style shooters" such as Half Life, which uses a mouse and keyboard control scheme to facilitate easier free aiming, rather than a target lock system. As such, "with our controls for a console-style shooter but our gameplay from a PC-style shooter, about a year into development we realized we had a dangerous disconnect in our design that made our game tedious instead of fun." However, with the release of successful console third-person shooters such as Max Payne, Halo, Medal of Honor: Frontline, and SOCOM, all of which "eschewed target-lock in favor of double-stick control schemes that simulated the mouse/keyboard experience from the PC", the team decided to scrap their target-lock system and go with a free aim system; "looking at the sales for these titles, we concluded the installed base of players who were familiar with these controls was now large enough that we could take the risk of turning off a few newbies. The change was a huge success for the game: it fixed the disconnect in our gameplay and added depth that had been completely missing."

=== Announcement and promotion ===
The game was unofficially revealed on March 17, 2003, when Midway Games sent a list of upcoming games out to retailers. The list included The Suffering, which was described as "action-horror game set inside a prison". The game was slated for an October 2003 release for PlayStation 2, GameCube and Xbox. Midway officially announced the game on April 15, calling it an "action-packed survival horror game set in a maximum security prison". Helene Sheeler, vice president of marketing for Midway stated, "The Suffering redefines terror with a chilling look into a penitentiary haunted by apparitions of executed prisoners grotesquely reincarnated as the methods of executions that befell them." It was also revealed the creatures in the game were designed by Stan Winston Studios.

Several days later, Midway revealed the game's fictional prison, Abbot State Penitentiary, located on Carnate Island, off the coast of Maryland was partially based on Alcatraz, located on Alcatraz Island off the coast of San Francisco. In the game, Abbot had been built from the remains of a World War II army base, whereas Alcatraz was originally a military prison. They also revealed the game would be M-rated, and the 3D game engine would draw the locations in real-time (as opposed to the 2D pre-rendered backgrounds found in the Resident Evil games). The game was first previewed at the E3 event in May.

In September, Midway announced the game was being pushed back from October 2003 to early 2004. Of the delay, Richard Rouse III wrote,

One of the most fortunate events of The Suffering's development was getting time to iterate on the game. Midway was quite happy with the game's progress and had seen a strong reaction to it from the press and public alike. Thus they gave us a generous time extension, not because we were behind schedule but because they wanted to make the game as strong as possible. Thus, with our levels all fully built and functional many months before shipping, we were able to do a number of passes on the game. We did a pass on horror elements to make the game more frightening, including adding our real-time environmental flashes that are so key to the final experience. We also did a story pass, not to change the story but to expand on how it was presented to the player. We performed an AI pass to make the creatures much more dynamic and varied in their behaviors. Finally we did a puzzle pass to fix the most egregious problems with the puzzles. The impact of these passes cannot be underestimated.

In October, Midway ran a promotional event in West Virginia State Penitentiary. A defunct gothic prison that is supposedly haunted, game journalists spent the night in the facility with representatives from Midway and Surreal Software. A demo of the game was available in the cafeteria of the building. On October 28, Midway announced the GameCube version had been cancelled, explaining "we want to concentrate on the leading platforms in the marketplace when it comes to launching original product. We are still publishing titles like Blitz and Hitz for the Nintendo GameCube, but for The Suffering we are concentrating on the Sony PlayStation 2 and Microsoft Xbox."

The game went gold on February 23, 2004, with a North American release date set for March 8. David Zucker, Midway's CEO, projected revenues of $140 million for the fiscal year of 2004, an increase of over 50% from that of 2003. CFO Thomas Powell stated the targets were based primarily on the company's high hopes for The Suffering, and their "second tier of titles", including NBA Ballers, MLB Slugfest, and Psi-Ops: The Mindgate Conspiracy, as well as titles coming later in 2004 such as Mortal Kombat: Deception, Area 51, and NARC.

On May 5, Encore announced they would be releasing the game for Windows at the end of the month.

=== Musical score ===
The music for The Suffering was composed by Erik Aho, who had previously worked with Surreal Software on Drakan: The Ancients' Gates. The original concept for the music and sound design was proposed by lead sound designer Boyd Post. The concept entailed creating "instruments" out of objects found in the environments depicted in the game, and using them to create both the sound design and the music, which would organically intertwine with one another. According to Post,

I worked with the composer to come up with a hybrid idea where we would extract the elements of the music from the sound design. I gathered up objects that were made of various elements; stone, steel, things that had long tones. We were using aluminium rods that were ten and twelve feet long and got them to resonate length wise. We were then striking them and getting them to resonate horizontally. We used just about anything we could think of to create sonic signatures that were not typically used in game sound effects.

Erik Aho further explains,

In any given level or boss battle, the music would be composed using only objects found in that environment or associated with a specific character. For example, in the prison level rhythms and textures using struck metal bars, slamming a dumpster against a wall, violent metal scrapes, the bowing of metal rods. In the asylum level, the whispers and cries of the insane were combined with the faint, sinister droning of the Victrola coming from Dr. Killjoy's office. In the cave, the musical textures were made entirely from the scraping, breaking, and striking of rocks. The battle with Hermes, who appears as green gas in the shape of a man, is scored using violent rhythms created from compressed air. For Horace, an inmate who died horribly in the electric chair and travels over power lines, the battle music is laced with rhythms created out of arcing electricity.

Instruments were also created by Seattle musician/instrument designer Ela Lamblin. These included a Stamenphone ("a sort of cross between a waterphone and a tambura that can be bowed to create droning tonal melodies or struck for a percussive metallic resonating sound") and Orbacles ("hollow metal pods large enough to fit a person inside. These could be struck to create percussive impacts, bowed with superballs to create moaning ambiences and played like congas to create rhythms"). These were combined with other objects such as hubcaps, railroad spikes, hammers and glass jars. Metal rods "were about 8-10 feet long and were played by rubbing rosin-coated gloves lengthwise along the rods. These created otherworldly drones that were later put into a sampler, pitched up and down and layered to create ambiences. The rods were also struck to create violent shrieks and metallic percussive sounds." A mounted bicycle wheel "was played by cranking the wheel and scraping different objects across the spokes."

Even strange events from the recording sessions at Robert Lange Studios made it onto the track. For example, according to Aho;

We were capturing Ela's droning metallic rod instrument and the engineer started complaining about background noise. I couldn't hear anything so we played back the recording. All of us immediately heard very faint whispering barely audible in the droning of the rods. We had all heard radio interference before but this was completely different. It sounded like it was coming from in the room. This whispering remains embedded and audible in the recording of the rods and can be heard in the ambient music for the Asylum level behind the added whispers.

Of the music as a whole, Aho says,

As all the instruments were more or less atonal, rhythm was the main structural device used during the composing process. In retrospect some of the ambient pieces fall within the "Dark ambient" genre of electronic music although neither Boyd or I were aware of other artists creating this kind of music. Some of the combat pieces could be described as truly "industrial" due to the heaviness of the tracks as well as the machine/metal based instruments.

=== Digital distribution ===
In October 2008, the PC version of the game was released as freeware by the United States Air Force on FileFront (no longer available). On September 8, 2017, both The Suffering and The Suffering: Ties That Bind were released on DRM-free platform GOG.com. On September 1, 2024, both games were removed from GOG.com, as requested by Warner Bros. Interactive.

== Reception ==
Reception

Aggregate score
Aggregator	Score		
Aggregator	PC	PS2	Xbox
Metacritic	80/100	77/100	77/100

Review scores
Publication	Score		
Publication	PC	PS2	Xbox
Eurogamer		7/10	
Game Informer		8.25/10	8.25/10
GameSpot	7.6/10	7.6/10	7.6/10
GameSpy	4/5	3/5	3/5
IGN	8.5/10	8.5/10	8.5/10
Official U.S. PlayStation Magazine		3/5	
Official Xbox Magazine (US)			7.3/10
PC Gamer (US)	86%		

The Suffering received "generally favorable reviews"; the PC version holds an aggregate score of 80 out of 100 on Metacritic, based on twenty-six reviews; the PlayStation 2 version 77 out of 100, based on forty-seven reviews; the Xbox version 77 out of 100, based on forty-four reviews.

Official U.S. PlayStation Magazine's Joe Rybicki scored the PlayStation 2 version 3 out of 5, arguing it was not scary due to it being an action game, as opposed to a survival-horror. He wrote "if Fatal Frame is the gaming equivalent of The Shining, The Suffering is Friday the 13th." Although he praised the morality system and the general gameplay, he concluded "I felt the psychological elements and the morality-play overtones were largely wasted on what is at its most fundamental level a fairly run-of-the-mill shooter."

Eurogamer's Tom Bramwell scored the PlayStation 2 version 7 out of 10. As with Rybicki, he felt the blend of action and horror elements didn't really work; "in trying to mix horror and action, The Suffering sets itself up for failure [...] once you shake off the anxiety you've been trained to associate with survival horror and just get on with it, it becomes something of a slog." However, he felt the game did feature "some genuinely disconcerting moments, an interesting story of demonic misadventure, some fairly ghastly sights and sounds, and some genuinely standout frights." He further wrote "Certainly it's been well designed in places." However, he concluded "The Suffering has some scary moments, but for the most part they punctuate a fairly regular, albeit twisted, action game, rather than driving it [...] It's a shame, because The Suffering could have been great. We're not asking for a carbon copy of Resident Evil or Silent Hill, but with a little more consideration, Surreal could have remoulded the experience a lot more effectively."

GameSpot's Jeff Gerstmann scored the game 7.6 out of 10, writing "it might be a little too straightforward in spots, but it does make for a solid action game." He concluded that "although The Suffering tends to rely more on startling you with visual effects and sudden attacks than on actually trying to scare you, it's still a pretty refreshing take on horror-themed games. [But] more monsters, more ways to do them in, and perhaps some slightly more-involving puzzles would have probably made the game feel more in-depth. But even taking this into consideration, The Suffering is a fun action game."

GameSpy's David Hodgson scored the PlayStation 2 and Xbox versions 3 out of 5, calling the game "Oz meets Clive Barker, drenched in the entrails of Stephen King. It's survival-horror with swears. It's the proof the ESRB is kidding Congress with the non-existent "Adults Only" rating. It's offensive, psyche-damaging, brutal, makes no sense, and is unforgiving and violent. And damn good fun." Scott Osborne scored the PC version 4 out of 5, writing "The Suffering offers a smooth blend of survival horror and shooter action." Of the PC port, he wrote "you'll find a few bugs, clipping problems, and occasional clunky moments when a character's important dialogue is interrupted by that of a scripted event, creating an audio muddle. It's a shame The Suffering didn't receive a bit more polishing and a major graphics upgrade for the PC. Still, with its well-designed levels, fluid pacing, and hyper-violent combat in eerie locales, The Suffering is a fun way to safely tap into your dark side."

Game Informer's Jeremy Zoss scored the PlayStation 2 and Xbox versions 8.25 out of 10, writing "if titles like Fatal Frame represent the psychological end of horror gaming, then The Suffering is the equivalent of a splatter flick." He concluded "while I have many positive things to say about this title, I cannot stress enough that it's not for everyone. Like a Friday the 13th movie, I would hardly call this game scary; it lacks the claustrophobia and dread of a survival horror title. It is, however, filled with tons of gore, vulgarity, and offensive material [...] If you think Peter Jackson's true masterpiece is Dead Alive, you'll be right at home with The Suffering."

IGN's Aaron Boulding scored the game 8.5 out of 10, giving the PlayStation 2 and Xbox versions an "Editor's Choice" award. He called it "a great game, not just a great horror game", writing "it succeeds as both a horrific thrill ride and fun action experience." He concluded "In a genre that's overrun with sequels and lame attempts at horror, The Suffering is a breath of fresh death rattle. The action is intense, the creatures are actually creepy, and the story does not shy away from truly macabre elements. One cannot say enough about the horrific world that's been created here. Everywhere you look, every little thing you do, has been placed there to ratchet up the suspense and put you in an eerie state of mind."

During the 8th Annual Interactive Achievement Awards, the Academy of Interactive Arts & Sciences nominated The Suffering for "Computer Action/Adventure Game of the Year".

=== Sales ===
The Suffering was a commercial success, selling over 1.5 million units worldwide across all platforms. The game was also credited with putting Midway "back on the map" as a major video game publisher after several years of games underperfoming.

In April, Midway announced their projected revenue for the first quarter of 2004 was $18 million, primarily due to the success of The Suffering. On April 6, Midway purchased Surreal Software. Midway CEO David Zucker stated "The positive market reception to The Suffering illustrates our ability to successfully develop and release entirely new properties that resonate strongly with the growing audience of sophisticated, mature gamers. The acquisition of Surreal Software Inc., the visionary developer behind The Suffering, strengthens our internal product development team and reinforces our ability to create high quality games." Surreal's co-founder, and The Suffering's director Alan Patmore stated "We developed a great working relationship with Midway during the development of The Suffering and feel that partnering with them will allow us to increase the quality of our titles by providing us with additional resources--and by allowing us to leverage their resources and expertise. It's that simple. We just want to make great games and feel that the acquisition will help us accomplish this goal."

== Film ==
On September 8, 2005, Midway and MTV Films announced a film adaptation based on both The Suffering and The Suffering: Ties That Bind was in development. Stan Winston had signed on to work on the project, with producers Jason Lust and Rick Jacobs. No writers, actors or directors had yet been approached. However, there have since been no further developments, with the project presumably cancelled.
