= Order of the Flame =

Order of the Flame may refer to:

- Order of the Flame, a religious order under the auspices of the World Methodist Council
- Drakan: Order of the Flame, an action-adventure video game
