= The Church in the Darkness =

2019 video game

- Developer: Paranoid Productions
- Publisher: Fellow Traveller
- Director: Richard Rouse III
- Designer: Richard Rouse III
- Programmers: Richard Rouse III; Carl Chavez Young; Ben Young
- Writer: Richard Rouse III
- Composers: Ellen McLain; John Patrick Lowrie
- Engine: Unity
- Platforms: macOS; Microsoft Windows; Nintendo Switch; PlayStation 4 Xbox One
- Release: August 2, 2019
- Genres: Action-adventure, stealth
- Mode: Single-player

The Church in the Darkness is an action-adventure video game. It was originally announced in 2016 to ship in early 2017, and was released in 2019 for Microsoft Windows, macOS, PlayStation 4, and Xbox One. It was designed by Richard Rouse III under the name Paranoid Productions.

== Gameplay ==
The Church in the Darkness is an "action-infiltration" game set inside a religious cult in the 1970s. The game revolves around an ex-law enforcement officer named Vic who attempts to get inside an isolated religious colony called "Freedom Town" to check in on his sister's son, Alex. The leaders, Isaac and Rebecca Walker of the "Collective Justice Mission", preach socialism and sustainable agricultural living in a Christian society. They are voiced by the couple, John Patrick Lowrie and Ellen McLain. The story unfolds through Isaac and Rebecca's regular updates on the camp's public address system.

Some elements of the game are procedurally generated, with each start changing people's allegiances, beliefs, and camp layout.

== Development ==
The game's premise arises from Rouse's lifelong fascination with cults. Rouse has been a fan of "open-narrative" games since the mid-'80s and he was "stunned" to see the many popular games of 2016 with fixed narratives. The game has been said to have "very obvious echoes of Jonestown". Rouse was particularly intrigued by the Source family, a spiritual commune in the late 1960s which was situated in the Hollywood Hills.

== Reception ==
Reception

Aggregate scores
Aggregator	Score
Metacritic	NS: 69/100; PC: 65/100; PS4: 58/100; XONE: 58/100
OpenCritic	24% recommend

The game received "mixed or average" reception from critics, according to the review aggregation website Metacritic. Fellow review aggregator OpenCritic assessed that the game received weak approval, being recommended by 24% of critics.

Robin Burks wrote for Screen Rant, "the big ideas don't live up to the hype with a game that's so small and gives the player very little to do."
