= This Is Vegas =

Video game, cancelled 2010

- Developer(s): Surreal Software
- Publisher(s): Warner Bros. Interactive Entertainment
- Engine: Unreal Engine 3
- Platform(s): Microsoft Windows; PlayStation 3 Xbox 360
- Release: Cancelled
- Genre(s): Action-adventure
- Mode(s): Single-player

This Is Vegas is a cancelled action-adventure video game that was in development at Surreal Software and was to be published by Warner Bros. Interactive Entertainment on Microsoft Windows, the PlayStation 3, and the Xbox 360. In 2010 development on the game was cancelled.

== Development ==
In January 2006, IGN reported that game development studio Surreal Software had posted job listings for artists to work on "an upcoming PlayStation 3 and Xbox 360 game that is, as of yet, without a title." In February 2008 the publishing company and parent of Surreal Software, Midway Games, announced that This Is Vegas was in development at the studio. Midway released several screenshots and stated that it planned to release the game on Microsoft Windows, the PlayStation 3, and the Xbox 360 in the fourth quarter of 2008. That same month Midway released the debut trailer for the game.

During Midway's bankruptcy proceedings in 2009, the company sold the majority of its assets to Warner Bros. Interactive Entertainment, including This Is Vegas and developer Surreal Software. In August 2010, it was reported that Warner Bros. cancelled development on the game. Midway and Warner Bros. spent between $40 million and $50 million developing the game.
