= Surreal Software =

American video game developer

- Type: Subsidiary
- Industry: Video games
- Founded: 1995; 31 years ago in Seattle, Washington, U.S.
- Founders: Stuart Denman; Mike Nichols; Alan Patmore; Nick Radovich
- Defunct: 2010
- Fate: Merged into Monolith Productions
- Successor: Monolith Productions
- Headquarters: Kirkland, Washington, U.S.
- Key people: Alan Patmore (co-founder and studio head); Stuart Denman (co-founder and studio technology director)
- Parent: Midway Games (2004–2009); Warner Bros. Interactive Entertainment (2009–2010)
- Website: surreal.com

Surreal Software was an American video game developer based in Kirkland, Washington, and a subsidiary of Warner Bros. Interactive Entertainment, known for The Lord of the Rings: The Fellowship of the Ring, The Suffering and Drakan series. Surreal Software employed over 130 designers, artists, and programmers. Surreal was acquired by Warner Bros. Games during the bankruptcy of Midway Games in July 2009. After a significant layoff in January 2011, the remaining employees were integrated into WBG's Kirkland offices, along with developers Monolith and Snowblind.

The studio last worked on This Is Vegas, a title which was scheduled to be released on Xbox 360, PlayStation 3 and Windows. The first screenshots, video and game information for This Is Vegas were unveiled the week of February 4, 2008, at IGN.

== History ==
Surreal Software was founded in 1995 as an independent video game development studio by Stuart Denman, Mike Nichols, Alan Patmore and Nick Radovich. Patmore, Nichols and Radovich attended Eastside Catholic High School in Bellevue, Washington together. They found Stuart Denman, a University of Washington grad, through an online message board. The group began operating in 1995 in an office in Seattle's Queen Anne neighborhood. Previously, Radovich sold real estate, Patmore worked at a wireless company, Nichols was working at local game company Boss Studios, and Denman had just interned at Microsoft on the Excel team.

Their first contract was with Bothell-based children's game developer Humongous, which found Denman's website and called to recruit programmers for Humongous. Surreal instead offered to do contract work. Surreal developed the Riot Engine for its games in 1996. First receiving critical acclaim with the 1999 release of Drakan: Order of the Flame, Surreal Software continued its success with Drakan: The Ancients' Gates in early 2002, both games selling in excess of 250,000 units. Having grown to two development teams, Surreal released The Lord of the Rings: The Fellowship of the Ring later that same year, selling over 1.8 million units.

In March 2004, Surreal Software released The Suffering, an original concept action-packed horror game set in a secluded island prison, with monster designs by Stan Winston. Gamers and critics alike enjoyed this bold new contribution to the horror genre and in 2005, The Suffering: Ties That Bind followed. In April 2004, Midway Games acquired Surreal Software as an in-house game studio. In 2006, the Surreal Software staff moved from Fremont to their new waterfront studio on Elliott Avenue next to the Olympic Sculpture Park. In 2009, Surreal Software was among the Midway Games assets purchased by Warner Bros. Interactive Entertainment. In 2010, the company was merged into the nearby studio Monolith Productions.

== Founders ==
All of the founders had left the company prior to its merging with Monolith.

- Stuart Denman – CTO
- Alan Patmore – CEO and Creative Director
- Nick Radovich – CFO
- Mike Nichols – Art Director

== List of games ==
| Year | Title | Platform(s) | |
| Year | Title | PC | Console |
|---|---|---|---|
| 1999 | Drakan: Order of the Flame | Microsoft Windows | — |
| 2002 | Drakan: The Ancients' Gates | — | PlayStation 2 |
| 2002 | The Lord of the Rings: The Fellowship of the Ring | Microsoft Windows | PlayStation 2 |
| 2004 | The Suffering | Microsoft Windows | PlayStation 2, Xbox |
| 2005 | The Suffering: Ties That Bind | Microsoft Windows | PlayStation 2, Xbox |

=== Canceled ===
- Gunslinger
- The Lord of the Rings: The Treason of Isengard
- This Is Vegas
