= Richard Rouse III =

American video game designer

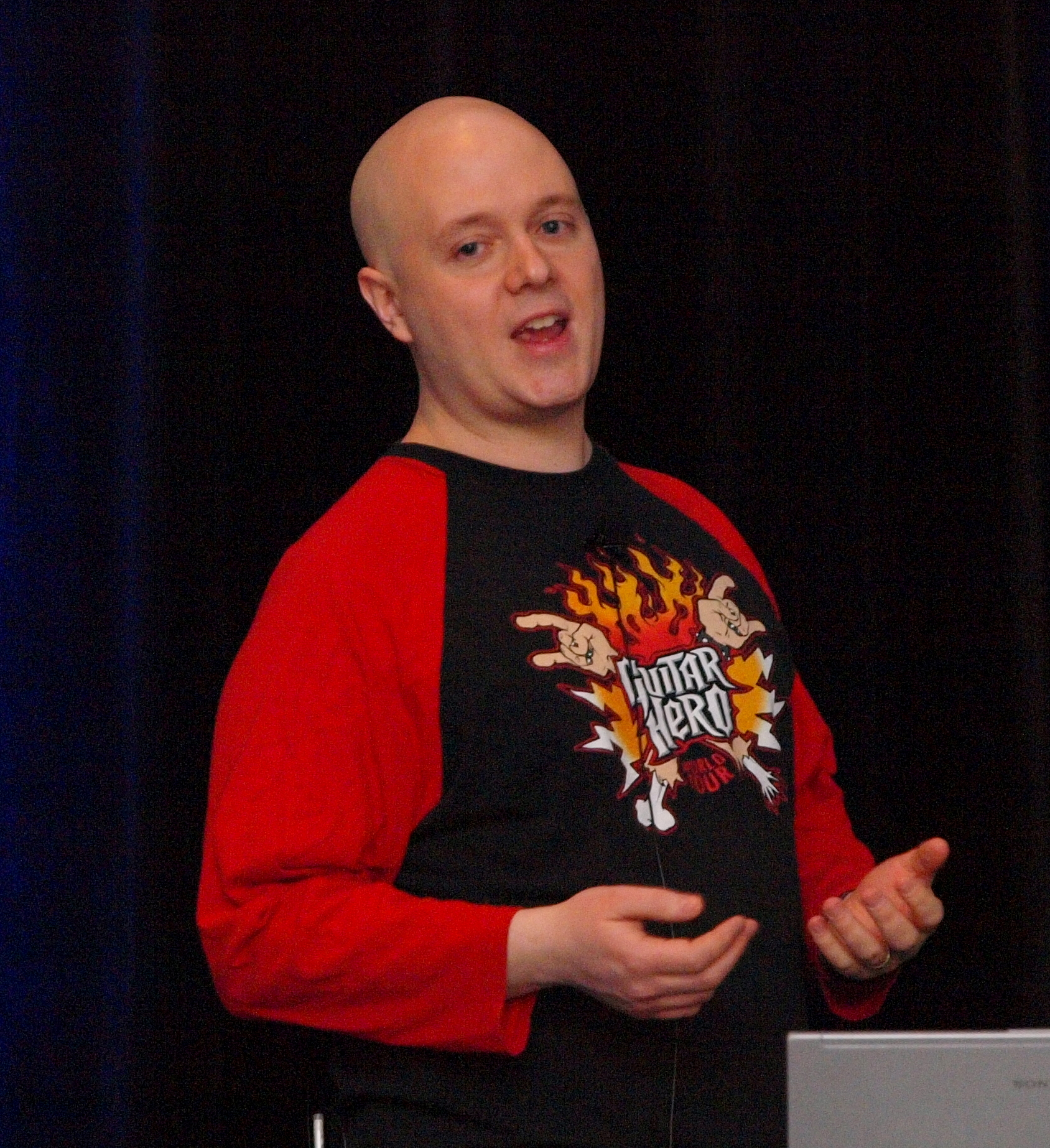
- At the 2010 Game Developers Conference
- Occupation: Video game designer

Richard Rouse III is an American video game designer best known as the designer of The Suffering (2004) and the author of Game Design: Theory & Practice.

== Career ==
Rouse produced two Macintosh games, fantasy RPG Odyssey: The Legend of Nemesis (1996) and the military first-person shooter Damage Incorporated (1997). They used the technology of Bungie's Minotaur and Marathon 2.

Rouse went on to work at Leaping Lizard Software where he was lead designer on the 1998 3D remake of Centipede. From there he moved to Surreal Software where he was lead designer and writer on the action horror game The Suffering and creative director and writer on its sequel, The Suffering: Ties That Bind.

Rouse wrote the book Game Design: Theory & Practice, first released in 2001 and revised in 2004.

Rouse was one of four creative leads working on Tom Clancy's Rainbow 6: Patriots for Ubisoft Montreal that were removed from the project in March 2012.

Rouse now works at FarBridge as Studio Creative Director where's been since 2021

== Video games ==
- Odyssey: The Legend of Nemesis (1996)
- Damage Incorporated (1997)
- Centipede (1998)
- The Suffering (2004)
- The Suffering: Ties That Bind (2005)
- The Church in the Darkness (2019)

== Books ==
- Game Design: Theory and Practice (2001, 2004)
