= Drakan: The Ancients' Gates =

2002 video game

- PAL version cover art
- Developer: Surreal Software
- Publisher: Sony Computer Entertainment
- Designer: Alan Patmore
- Composer: Erik Aho
- Platform: PlayStation 2
- Release: NA: January 29, 2002; PAL: July 5, 2002
- Genre: Action-adventure
- Mode: Single-player

Drakan: The Ancients' Gates is a 2002 action-adventure video game developed by Surreal Software and published by Sony Computer Entertainment for the PlayStation 2. It is the sequel to Surreal Software's 1999 Windows game Drakan: Order of the Flame. which was published by SCE subsidiary Psygnosis. The game's name comes from the eponymous Ancients' Gates, which are the central focus of the story.

== Gameplay ==
The gameplay of Drakan: The Ancients' Gates is virtually identical to its predecessor. It is a third-person action-adventure perspective that consists of two main parts of gameplay - on the ground and in the air.

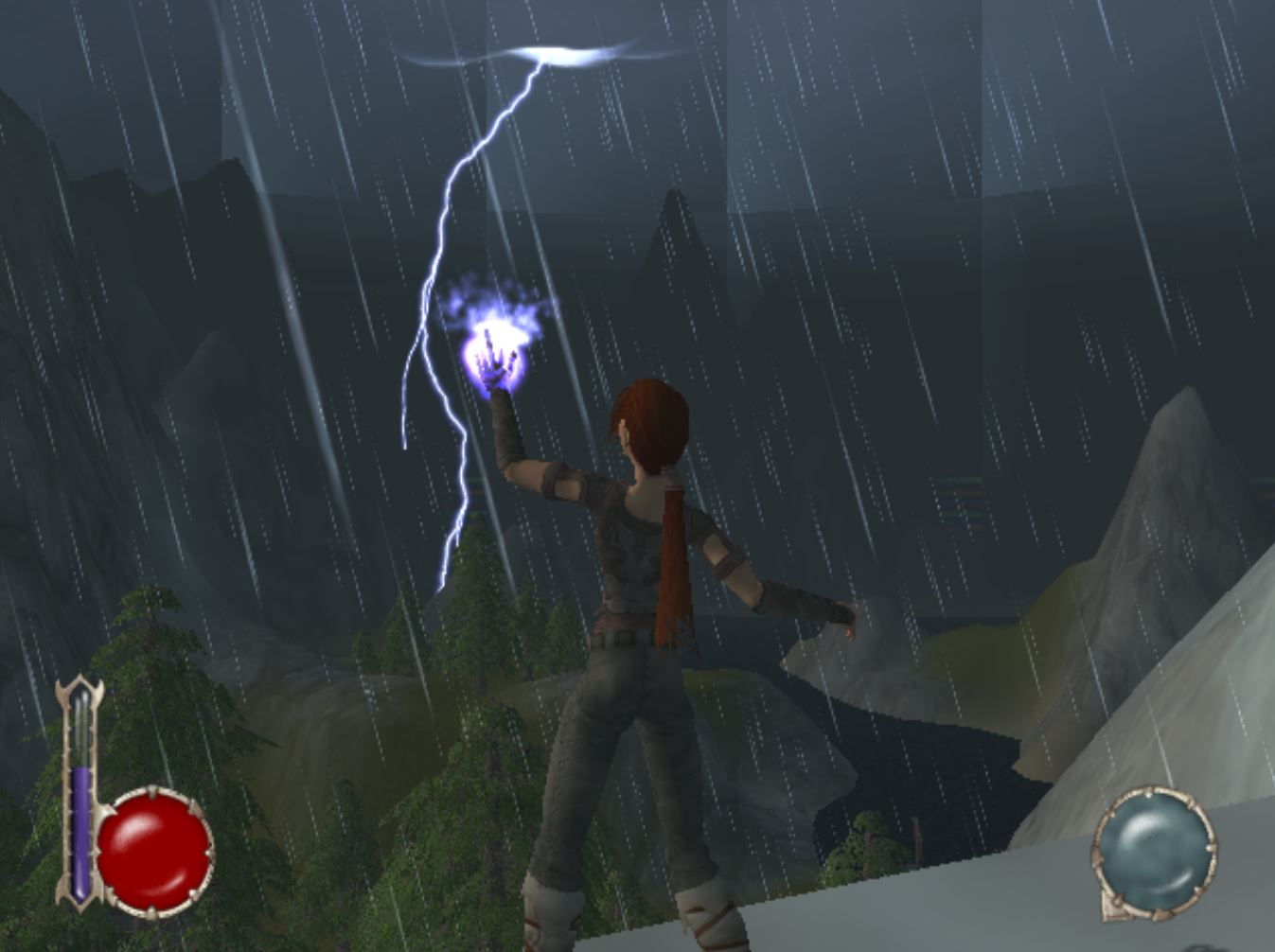
Rynn casting a spell with a hand gesture, each spell has a unique gesture.

When controlling the protagonist, Rynn, on the ground, there are many ways in which the player can fight. Drakan: The Ancient Gates introduces target locking on enemies in order to focus Rynn’s hits, as well as magic spell castings, on the enemy at hand. 30 spells can be learned, which require directional movement of the control stick on the PS2 controller. Spells including Clone, Combust, and Fear are additions to the game often not seen amongst other RPGs. There are 74 weapons that players can choose from, that are either acquired from shops or as loot, that include swords, clubs, bows, and even scimitars. An additional fighting tactic that can be used on the ground is Arokh’s fire-breathing, when called-upon, but this can only be accessed later in gameplay.

When flying mounted on Arokh, a dragon, the duo is superior to any ground enemy, but on the other hand, facing flying enemies will require a lot of maneuver and aim. Arokh can target-lock enemies, similar to Rynn, and can use various elemental attacks, like fire, electricity, and sonic waves. When controlling Arokh, the player has free movement in three dimensions, up and down, left and right, forward and backward.

While there is no difficulty setting in the game, there are skill trees implemented into the game to enhance the player’s power output. Experience points, gained through defeating enemies, are the currency to acquire skills in the following three different skill trees: Melee, Archery, and Magic. Skill trees can be built in a balanced manner throughout the game, or the player can choose to specialize in one fighting style to start.

== Plot ==
This game takes place sometime after the events in Order of the Flame. Rynn and Arokh answer a call from the city of Surdana. Lady Myschala of Surdana asks for Rynn and Arokh's assistance. An evil race of three-faced beings known as the Desert Lords has begun rallying the monsters from around the world (similar to how the Dark Union did in Order of the Flame) and have begun enslaving humans. Around the world, there exist four gateways that lead to the world where the dragon mother, Mala-Shae, and her brood have been slumbering since the Dark Wars. Only a Dragon of the Elder Breed can open the gates, and this is why Rynn and Arokh (more specifically, Arokh) are needed to open these gates, so that the humans can once again bond with dragons and fight back against the Desert Lords. Along the way, the two of them must go on various side quests to accomplish goals leading them to the ultimate goal.

== Graphics ==
Graphical improvements have been made for Drakan: The Ancient Gates, being a sequel to Drakan: Order of the Flame, in which the first title was made for PC, while the sequel was made for PlayStation 2. By having a console that can handle an increased workload, more polygons are used to achieve higher detail, while maintaining the same framerate proportions. Rynn, for example, is made up of over 14 times the number of polygons from the first game, while Arokh is composed of around 13 times his counterpart. Ambient settings, like dungeons and castles, are more detailed in terms of depth and contrast. The render distance of fog while flying Arokh has been adjusted to allow for more of the scenery to be seen during travelling and fighting mid-air.

== Reception ==
The game received an aggregate score of 78/100 on Metacritic, based on 31 critic reviews. Tom Bramwell of Eurogamer gave the game a 4/10 score, praising the story, humor and combat, but he criticized the large amount of bugs and a lack of variety in gameplay. Doug Perry of IGN was more positive, giving it a 8.1/10 score; he praised the game for its expansive world and combat, while comparing it favorably to The Legend of Zelda: Ocarina of Time. Niel Harris of Electric Playground rated the game a 9.5 out of 10 for its attention to detail, soundscape, and clear focus on gameplay. Reviewing for Yolk magazine, Renan Balanga bemoaned the loading times and the audiovisuals. He rated the game 2½ out of 5 stars.

In its first two weeks the game sold more than 20,000 copies. Between both Drakan: Order of the Flame and Drakan: The Ancient Gates, 250,000 copies sold in total overall, as of 2011.
