= The Suffering: Ties That Bind =

2005 video game

- North American cover art
- Developer: Surreal Software
- Publisher: Midway Games (Note: Published by Warner Bros. Interactive Entertainment on GOG.com.)
- Director: Richard Rouse III
- Producer: Noah Raymond Heller
- Designer: Andre Maguire
- Programmer: Eric Snyder
- Artist: Beau Folsom
- Writer: Richard Rouse III
- Composers: Erik Aho; Boyd Post
- Engine: Riot Engine
- Platforms: PlayStation 2; Windows; Xbox
- Release: NA: September 26, 2005; PAL: October 28, 2005
- Genres: First-person shooter, third-person shooter, survival horror
- Mode: Single-player

The Suffering: Ties That Bind is a 2005 first and third-person shooter horror video game developed by Surreal Software and published by Midway Games for PlayStation 2, Xbox and Windows. Stan Winston helped with the game's design. The game was released in North America in September and in Europe and Australia in October. It is a sequel to the 2004 game The Suffering. In 2017, it was released on GOG.com.

The game continues the story of Torque, a man sentenced to death for murdering his ex-wife and two children. In the original game, after arriving on death row in Abbot State Penitentiary on Carnate Island, off the coast of Maryland, an earthquake rocks the island, and the prison is attacked by strange supernatural creatures. During the mayhem, Torque escapes. Ties That Bind continues his story, as he flees the island and heads back to his home town of Baltimore, where Torque must once again battle the creatures from Carnate, now terrorizing Baltimore, while facing his past misdeeds and confronting his nemesis, a mysterious criminal kingpin known as Blackmore, who is connected to Torque's past and his family's deaths. Players who have a saved game from The Suffering can choose one of three different openings, based upon the ending they received in the first game. As with the original game, Ties That Bind also features three different endings, depending on the players' actions throughout the game.

Ties That Bind received favorable reviews, but was generally criticized as being too similar to the original game. Some critics felt the game would only appeal to fans of the first game, while others argued the more complex storyline and serious moral issues made it worthwhile on its own merits. Despite mostly positive reception, the game saw underwhelming sales. For a time Surreal Software initially spoke about the possibility of expanding The Suffering franchise into a multi-game series, however Ties That Bind remains the final installment to the series.

== Gameplay ==
Ties That Bind is a first and third-person shooter psychological horror game in which the player controls Torque, the player character, from either a first-person or third-person perspective, depending on their preference. The game is fully playable in both first and third-person views, with all actions available in both modes. Torque can run, shoot, jump, crouch, roll, interact with the environment, interact with NPCs, and use items, such as flashlights, flash grenades, shrapnel grenades, and molotov cocktails. Weaponry includes knives, axes, baseball bats, steel pipes, Colt 1911s, .357 revolvers, 12 gauge pumps, sawed-off shotguns, Škorpions, M3A1s, tommy guns, M60s, grenade launchers, and RPG-7s. Other items which can be found during the game are Xombium tablets (which restore the player's health), paperwork with story content, maps, ammo, and flashlight batteries.

Two major gameplay alterations in Ties That Bind concern pickups. Firstly, Torque can no longer stockpile Xombium bottles, allowing the player to refill their health whenever they wish. Instead, Torque must rely on stationary Xombium located at set points throughout the game. Secondly, the player is limited to carrying only two weapons at any given time, although is free to choose which two; the play may carry two melee weapons, two guns, or one of each. Also, whereas in the first game, Torque could only dual-wield the handgun, in Ties That Bind, he can dual-wield any one handed weapon, including the sawed-off shotgun. Guns can also be used to inflict minor melee damage.

Whereas in the first game, each enemy represented either a form of execution or an historical event on Carnate Island, in Ties That Bind, the enemies, collectively referred to as "Malefactors," represent facets of both modern life and past violence on the crime-ridden streets of Baltimore. Slayers represent knife crime, Gorgers represent a Baltimore urban legend told to children during the food shortages of the Great Depression to explain why there was no food, Arsonists represent vacant buildings burning down, killing squatters within them, Triggermen represent gun crime, Mainliners represent drug dealing, Marskmen represent military suppression of civil unrest, Maulers represent the city's history of slavery, Burrowers represent laborers who died during the construction of the city's underground, Suppressors represent the CERT unit used in prisons, Isolationists represent solitary confinement, and the Horde represents mob violence. Slayers, arsonists and triggermen also feature "captain" strains; these versions of the creature cannot be injured by normal weaponry, and can only be defeated when Torque is in his monster form. They are also able to generate normal versions of themselves.

Basic gameplay in Ties That Bind showing the HUD in first-person mode. Torque's health and insanity meter are on the top left. On the top right are, from left to right, his ammo count, projectile weapon count, and flashlight power.

As in the original game, as Torque kills enemies, an on-screen meter called his "Insanity meter" begins to fill. Once it is full, it begins to flash, and at this point, Torque can transform into a monster. In this form, Torque can tear enemies apart and perform several powerful special attacks. New to Ties That Bind is the ability to perform a charged attack. Also new to the game is that Torque can transform into a different monster, depending on his morality level. If Torque's morality is towards good, his insanity mode is blue and more human like. If he is moving towards evil, his insanity mode is red, and his monster form is less human. Whereas in the original game, upgrades were based on the number of times the player used the special attack, in Ties That Bind, upgrades are unique to the moral path Torque is on; as he advances on the path, more attacks become available. Evil and good morality each have four levels of upgrades. Another change to insanity mode is that in the original game, staying in this mode drained health, and could kill Torque if he didn't transform back soon enough. In Ties That Bind, however, staying in insanity mode too long doesn't kill Torque, but when he transforms back to human form, he will be dizzy and unable to move or fight for a moment.

A major part of the gameplay in Ties That Bind, as in the original game, concerns Torque's morality. At numerous points during the game, the player will encounter situations where they have several choices as to how to proceed. These situations often involve NPCs, and the choices are usually to help the person (good morality), kill them (bad morality), or ignore them (neutral morality). In many situations, when Torque first encounters an NPC, the player will hear the voice of Torque's dead wife urging him to help them, and almost immediately afterwards will hear the voice of Blackmore, the game's antagonist, urging him to kill them. Over the course of the game, the decisions made concerning Torque's morality cumulate, and the player will get one of three endings based on Torque's final morality level. How Torque's actions affect his morality is usually indicated by the reaction of his wife, who will praise him if he commits a good act, and Blackmore, who will praise him if he does something evil. The player can get a rough idea of Torque's morality level by both his own physical appearance (he will begin to look less and less human the more evil acts he commits) and by looking at a family photograph which he carries with him at all times; the cleaner the photo, the purer his morality. If the photo is dirty, crumpled and covered in blood, his morality is moving towards evil. There is also a morality gauge in the menu, which shows exactly where Torque's morality is currently positioned.

== Story ==
Note: This plot synopsis details the "good ending"

The game begins five years prior to the original, with Torque serving time in Eastern Baltimore Correctional. Having been served divorce papers by Carmen (Rafeedah Keys), he is playing chess with his friend Miles (Arif S. Kinchen), who believes their incarceration was orchestrated by a criminal named Blackmore. As they talk, they are confronted by Blackmore (Michael Clarke Duncan) and his gang, who are unhappy that Blackmore's rules are not being followed. As the gang begin to beat up Miles, a riot starts. Torque and Miles are separated, and Torque experiences visions of the creatures he would encounter five years later on Carnate.

The game then cuts to the end of the first game. Depending on the player's saved game, one of three opening cutscenes play:

- Good ending: Torque is with the coast guard coming from Carnate. As they approach Baltimore harbor, they encounter an army of mercenaries. The coast guard hands Torque over, but Torque faints, and two soldiers approach him, with one saying "We need to get him inside ASAP. This guy's the prime."
- Neutral ending: Torque is driving the coast guard's boat when he has a vision of Carmen, who tells him "you went through so much, all because you could never control your anger." The boat is approached by a helicopter, which orders Torque to dock. He does so, but faints, with a mercenary saying "We need to get him inside ASAP. This guy's the prime."
- Bad ending: Torque is in a semi-unconscious state on the shore of Carnate, with Killjoy (John Armstrong) berating him, telling him he thought he was cured, and warning if he thinks he has seen the worst of things, he is mistaken. With that, mercenaries arrive and place Torque on a helicopter, with one of them saying, "we have secured the prime target."

When Torque awakens, he is strapped down in a warehouse guarded by mercenaries, and introduced to Jordan (Rachel Griffiths), leader of an organization called The Foundation, who tells him the "malefactors" are her life's work. However, when the building's power cuts out, Jordan leaves, and Torque is released, hearing Foundation soldiers say the "specimens" have broken lose. Seeing a vision of Carmen telling him he must return to their apartment, he heads into the sewers, where he has visions of Copperfield (Bob Papenbrook), an infamous slave hunter, and The Creeper (Scott Bullock), a pimp turned serial killer. Upon reaching his apartment, he finds a letter from Carmen asking for a divorce, a letter from Miles saying he is learning more about Blackmore, and a letter from Blackmore advising Torque to forget about Carmen. He has a vision of Carmen, who mentions Blackmore goes by the moniker of "The Colonel," and sees Killjoy on the TV, who reminds him Blackmore hired people to kill his family. As Torque leaves his apartment, he sees the malefactors have broken loose onto the streets of Baltimore.

He encounters a drug addict named Kyle (Scott Menville), who is convinced Torque is his father, and together, they head to a crack house, passing the gazebo where Torque and Carmen first met. Torque has a series of flashbacks to his early dates with Carmen, his initial employment by Blackmore, and the conflict between them over his loyalties. Heading to Miles' bar, he experiences a flashback to the incident for which he was arrested; a man threatened his children and called Carmen a whore, prompting an enraged Torque to kill him seconds before the police arrived. Miles then contacts Torque via radio, telling him they have to kill Blackmore.

After being separated, Miles tells Torque to meet him at the harbor, where they will interrogate Jordan and find out where Blackmore is. Torque returns to the warehouse, and encounters an imprisoned Consuela Alverez (Meg Savlov), wife of Ernesto, a CO from Carnate Island. He releases her, and helps her get a boat to Carnate where she plans to search for her husband and children. He is then ambushed by Foundation soldiers. However, a truck driven by Jordan rescues him. She explains her men have betrayed her, and are working directly for Blackmore, who has been funding the Foundation for years. She is taking him to Eastern Correctional, Blackmore's location.

In Eastern, Torque encounters a dying member of Blackmore's gang, who says "the things you did in here. I mean, you sure made your mark, but why would you hire someone to..." With that, the lights go out, and when they turn back on, the man is dead. Torque is contacted by Miles, who angrily tells him "how long it's been man? How long you been making a mockery of everything?" He then encounters Warden Elroy (James Patrick Stuart), son of the infamous warden Raymond Elroy, who took sadistic pleasure in torturing inmates through manual labor and solitary confinement. Elroy tells Torque the prison has descended into chaos since the appearance of the malefactors, and asks for help in restoring order. He is able to convince the guards and prisoners to work together, and with Torque's help they are able to escape, although Torque remains behind.

He meets up with Miles, who angrily says "it's been years man, years I been trying to get the straight word on Blackmore. And what the fuck is up with you my man? First I hear this, I couldn't believe, I said no way, not my man Torque. That cracker bleeding out in the basement, he told me what's what and he got no reason to lie. My brain ready to pop. It's too whack, nobody'd make this up. Nobody would never say that you..." However, Torque blacks out, and when he awakens, Miles is dead. Blackmore then contacts Torque, telling him to come to the drowning pool beneath the prison's factory. As Torque heads there, he is attacked by Foundation soldiers backed up by a helicopter piloted by Jordan, who was lying about her men betraying her. Torque defeats the soldiers and kills Jordan.

In the drowning pool, Killjoy, Copperfield and The Creeper assess Torque's moral actions. Torque fights and defeats Copperfield. However, Blackmore leaves, compelling Torque to follow him. They return to where Torque grew up; Garvey Children's Home. Inside, Torque remembers meeting Blackmore for the first time. However, in his memory, Blackmore is an adult, Torque is a child, and none of the staff can see or hear Blackmore. Blackmore then confronts Torque, telling him that the ties that bind them can never be cut. Torque realizes the truth - Blackmore is not real, but is actually Torque's alter ego, having first appeared as an imaginary friend when Torque was a child. When Torque blacks out, Blackmore's personality takes over, but now, Blackmore wants to be in control all the time; "we've only got the one body, and I'm tired of sharing." He transforms into a monster, and he and Torque fight, with Torque defeating him. Blackmore disappears, and, if the game began with good morality, Torque is approached by Carmen, who tells him, "I never want us to be apart again."

=== Alternate endings ===
==== Neutral ending ====
Numerous things are different throughout the game if the player is playing as a neutral character. For example, the letter from Blackmore is to Cory, not Torque, telling him Torque doesn't really love him. During the scene when Torque sees Killjoy on his TV, Killjoy reminds Torque that Blackmore had manipulated Cory. When the helicopter attacks, it is piloted by Jordan, and in the drowning pool, Torque fights Copperfield. Later, Blackmore reveals that he gave Cory spiked drugs prior to Cory's murder of Malcolm and subsequent suicide. In the final battle, neither Blackmore nor Torque is able to win, and when they approach one another they are repelled away from touching. Blackmore points out "Looks like we're going to play this game a while longer. I couldn't change you, and you couldn't get rid of me. The ties that bind, they'll keep us connected, but apart. And I'll be right here, standing over your shoulder."

==== Bad ending ====
Numerous things are different throughout the game if the player is playing as an evil character. For example, the letter from Blackmore is to Carmen, not Torque, warning that Torque can't be trusted with the safety of their children. During the scene when Torque sees Killjoy on his TV, Killjoy reminds him that even though he killed his own family, Blackmore had convinced him that Carmen was planning on taking the children away. Later in the game, Jordan meets Torque prior to his arrival in the drowning pool and joins him on his way there. When the helicopter attacks, it is piloted by Blackmore, and Jordan helps Torque fight the Foundation soldiers. In the drowning pool, instead of fighting Copperfield, Torque fights and defeats The Creeper. In the final battle, Blackmore defeats Torque, and absorbs Torque into him. If the player has kept Jordan alive throughout the game, she then approaches Blackmore, asking if Torque is gone. Blackmore says he is gone "for good," and they kiss.

== Development ==
=== Origin and influences ===
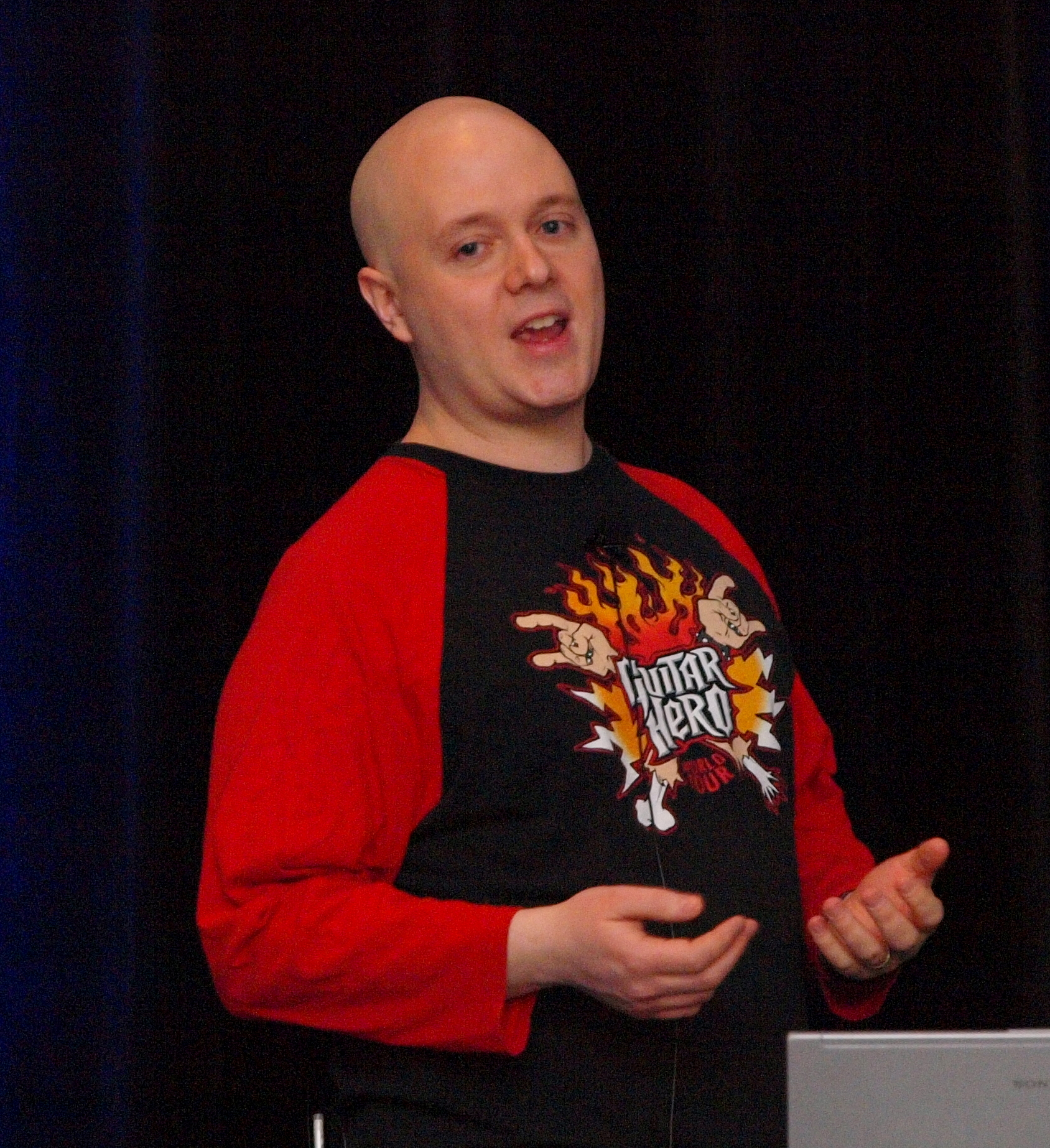
Richard Rouse III, writer and director of The Suffering: Ties That Bind

The origins of Ties That Bind date back to the late development stages of the original Suffering game, when Surreal Software first discussed the possibility of a sequel. However, although Ties That Bind writer and director Richard Rouse III, who also wrote and designed the original game, was open to the possibility for The Suffering to develop into a multi-game series, he emphasized that each game should be a stand-alone experience, albeit with unanswered questions to leave the door open for the next game. As such, the concept of the sequel had no impact on the development of the first game;

the idea to do a sequel was definitely something that emerged toward the end of development of the first game, but we didn't make any changes to the first game's story to create a cliffhanger or anything like that. When doing games that are part of a series, I always want to make sure each game will really stand on its own. At the same time, the world of The Suffering was built from the start to leave a lot of questions unanswered [...] So after the first game was complete, we had a fertile ground in which to expand the world for a new story. In Ties That Bind we're definitely introducing as many questions as we are answering, leaving plenty of opportunity for more games in the future. But again, what's of paramount importance to me is to make a game that players can finish and feel they have received a complete experience, not that they need another chapter to get closure.

Influences on the game came from a wide variety of philosophy, historical writing, film, and television. Some of the fact based elements of the storyline, such as issues concerning slavery and the Underground Railroad, and food shortages during the Great Depression were influenced by Howard Zinn's A People's History of the United States. Philosophical questions concerning the morality of modern prisons were derived from Michel Foucault's Discipline and Punish. For an insight into contemporary prison culture, and the United States penal system as a whole, the developers looked at Jack Abbott's In the Belly of the Beast and Ted Conover's Newjack: Guarding Sing Sing, while for inspiration regarding setting the game in an impoverished non-specific area of East Baltimore, they read David Simon's The Corner: A Year in the Life of an Inner-City Neighborhood. Filmic influences included Stanley Kubrick's The Shining, which was also a major influence on the first game. The developers also cited Roman Polanski's Repulsion and Rosemary's Baby, Alfred Hitchcock's Psycho and The Birds, and David Lynch's Blue Velvet and Mulholland Drive. More specific horror films included Japanese horrors such as Hideo Nakata's Ring and Dark Water, and Takashi Shimizu's The Grudge, as well as English language films such as Alejandro Amenábar's The Others and Neil Marshall's The Descent, to which Rouse referred for its strong sense of claustrophobia and entrapment. Rouse was also especially impressed with David S. Marfield's neo-noir film Deepwater, about a man with schizophrenia, which manifests itself in a 'good' personality and a 'bad' personality. For the more tactile elements of the Baltimore setting, the developers watched episodes of Homicide: Life on the Street and The Wire.

=== Setting ===
According to Rouse, setting the first game on an island off Maryland, and the second in Maryland's largest city, Baltimore, were decisions made with the mandates of the story very much in mind;

in the first game we had set the game off the coast of Maryland because we wanted to be able to incorporate the history of the East Coast of the US. We really wanted to create a sense of a lingering evil that has been resident for centuries. By placing the game in the mid-Atlantic region we could pull on historical events from up and down the coast. So we could include witch trials, something which had taken place primarily in New England, while also accessing some of the history of the South, in particular the dark legacy of slavery. With the game set in Maryland we were able to draw on historical events from all up and down the East Coast while still remaining relatively believable. From an island off the coast of Maryland, wanting to go to an urban environment led us to one obvious choice: Baltimore. Baltimore's mid-Atlantic location means we can pull on the same historical variety that we did in the first game, and Baltimore's dark past and present is a major part of the story of Ties That Bind.

In setting the game in Baltimore, the development team conducted research into the city. They had no interest in creating a game world which was a literal recreation of any part of Baltimore, instead they wanted to ensure they got the general look and feel of the city correct;

a group of us went on a research trip to Baltimore, which enabled us to collect extensive photo reference on the city. We certainly captured a lot about Baltimore's distinct row-house architecture, but we also visited some of the city's rundown harbor areas [...] We also wanted to have a public housing development immediately next to the prison that included the group home where Torque grew up. When we did our research trip to Baltimore we found exactly what we needed: next to Baltimore City Correctional is a large public housing development, including the LaTrobe Homes. It made sense to me that public housing would be located on the undesirable real estate immediately adjacent to a prison, and it was chilling to see my suspicion borne out in reality.

In a more specific sense, the team used Baltimore City Correctional as a direct influence for Eastern Baltimore Correctional, the prison which features in the game. Rouse wanted the prison in Ties That Bind to contrast strongly with Abbot State Penitentiary from the first game, and he felt Baltimore City Correctional provided the influence to accomplish this insofar as "it is fascinating because of its distinct look and feel, which incorporates a wide variety of architecture styles from the various eras in which it was expanded."

=== Moral paths ===
As with the original game, the notion of alternate moral pathways was of paramount importance to the gameplay of Ties That Bind. In the first game, the player's morality not only determined how the game ended, it also determined Torque's past, insofar as the player's actions during the game dictated whether or not Torque had killed his family. So too in Ties That Bind, the player's morality determines both the end of the game, and the events which precede the game, specifically the role Blackmore had in the death of Torque's family. However, whereas in the first game, the player's morality was manifested primarily in the ending they received, in Ties That Bind, morality determines the beginning, the end, and creates what Rouse refers to as a "ripple effect" throughout the entire game. For example, during the scene where Torque meets Killjoy at the theatre, depending on the player's morality, the cutscene can feature Carmen, Cory or Jordan. Additionally, the player's morality determines whether they fight Creeper or Copperfield.

Speaking of the "ripple effect," Rouse explains that, to a certain extent, it was dictated by a sense of narrative logic; "it's really crucial that Carmen treats you differently depending on whether you killed her or not. It doesn't make sense that she'd still be loving toward you if you killed her in cold blood." However, it was also important that the player never feel locked into one morality; they could begin the game with bad morality and finish with good morality; "you can travel down different moral paths, and both the beginning you started with and the choices you make during Ties That Bind will affect your final outcome. So there are really a surprising number of possible stories to be told. I want every player to have their own unique version of Torque's story. I hope no two players will remember the game and the story exactly the same."

Speaking of the complexity of writing a story with so many variables, Rouse explains that no matter what morality the player has from the original game, there are still unanswered questions to be addressed, and multiple paths to take to the end;

as Ties That Bind begins, Torque already knows whether he is guilty of killing his family or not. This is tied to our "multiple beginnings" system that links to the end of the first game. But there's still a lot the player does not know, particularly the reasons for Torque's actions. For the evil beginning, players still don't know what drove Torque to kill his family in cold blood. For the medium beginning, players have little insight into what drove Torque's boy, Cory, to behave so monstrously. For the good beginning, players have no idea who "the Colonel" is or why he sought revenge on Torque. And for each different beginning to Ties That Bind, there are multiple endings, each based on how players play this game.

Rouse also emphasizes the protean nature of the narrative by pointing out that the character of Torque is essentially whoever the player decides for him to be;

with the Suffering series and the player's control over the narrative, we are fortunate enough to have both a main character with a distinct past and someone players feel they can become. Torque, who is almost entirely mute for both games, is haunted by his role in the death of his family, which makes for great drama and conflict. But we don't have the problem of distancing the player from the character, since the nature of that dark act is determined by the player's actions. Players can't say, "But I never would have killed my family," because we can point to their actions in the game and show them that's exactly the kind of person they are. Or at least that's how they were when they were playing the game.

=== Insanity mode ===
When designing Ties That Bind, one of the main aspects of the game the team wished to address was insanity mode, which was their least favorite game mechanic from the first game;

one of our biggest concerns from the first game was the creature Torque could transform into. Everyone who saw the feature loved it, but most people didn't bother using it that much because it wasn't as effective as Torque wielding his Tommy gun or double pistols. So this time we've really made the creature form significantly more powerful, and we're going to be careful balancing the game so you won't have quite as much ammo at your disposal and you're really going to want to turn into the creature, just to stay alive.

Additionally, whereas insanity mode in the first game was nothing more than an optional attack mode, in Ties That Bind insanity mode is tied into the narrative; "for Ties That Bind, the insanity mode's connection to the player's story is even more significant, with the creature actually changing its form and its game mechanics based on the moral path the player is on. And in the new game the creature is also integral to the endgame, but in a significantly different way. The story of The Suffering would be very different indeed without insanity mode."

=== Announcement and promotion ===
Ties That Bind was first referred to in late 2004, when Midway Games released an earnings statement in which it spoke of the financial success of the first game. No other information was revealed at the time, other than the fact that a sequel was in development. On January 19, 2005, Midway revealed the game would be released for PlayStation 2 and Xbox, and was being developed by Surreal Software, the same team who had worked on the first game. They also announced the title, and revealed the game would begin moments after the end of the first game, but the intro sequence would depend on which ending the player received in the first game, assuming they still had a saved game file.

At its annual Gamer's Day junket in Las Vegas on February 17, Midway announced the game would also be released for Windows, and made available playable demos of all three versions. The demo revealed Torque could only hold two weapons at a time, and the new insanity mode, which ties into Torque's morality. The game was next shown at the 2005 E3 event in May.

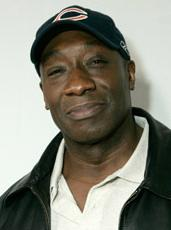
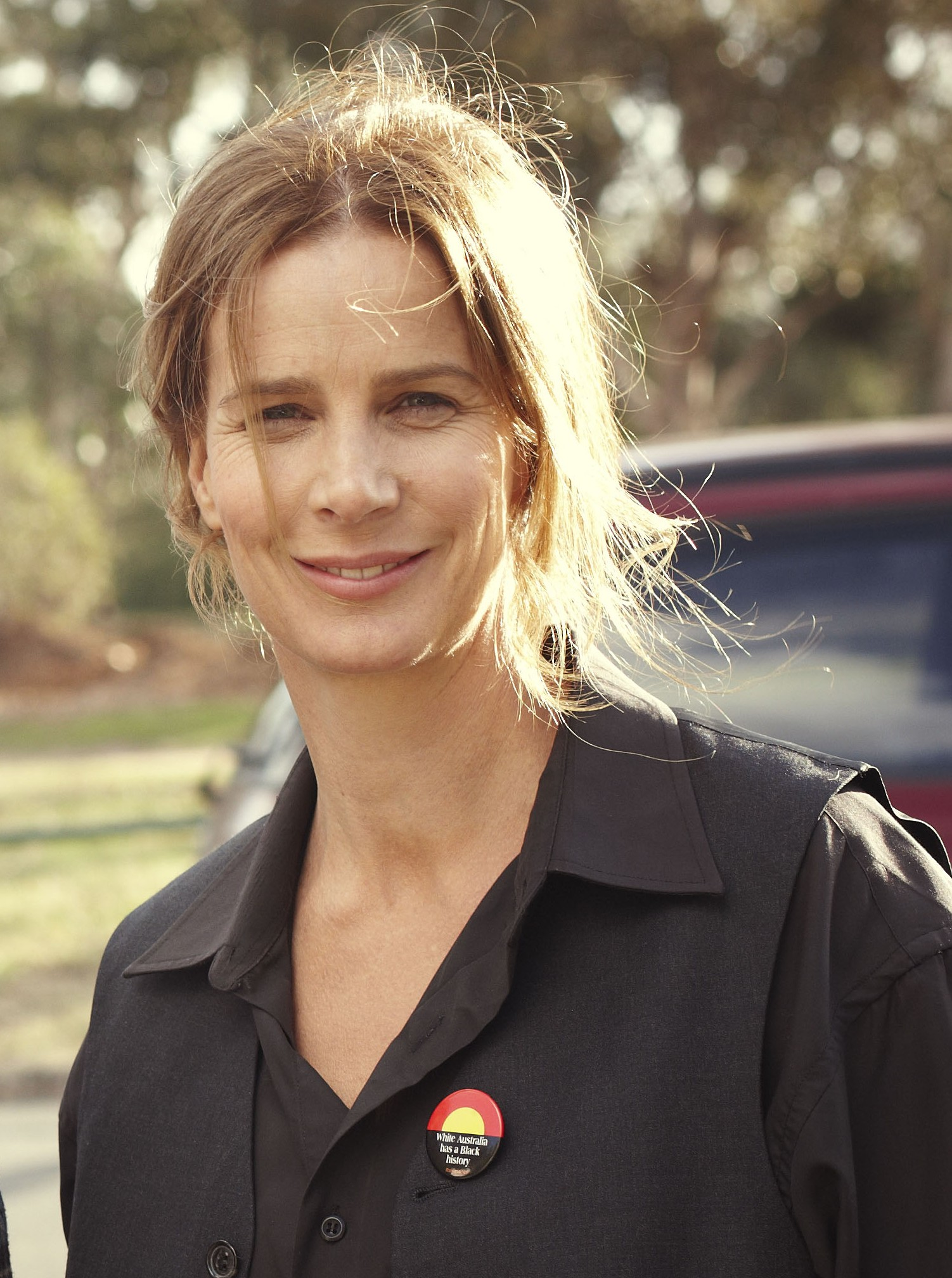
Michael Clarke Duncan (left) and Rachel Griffiths (right) voice the game's two primary villains, Blackmore and Jordan, respectively.

On July 22, Midway announced oscar nominated actors Michael Clarke Duncan and Rachel Griffiths would be voicing the roles of Blackmore and Jordan, respectively. Midway marketing chief Steve Allison stated, "The Suffering has so much depending on the performances of the entire voice cast that we just felt we could really improve the game by elevating the expectations on the performance of the voice talent."

At a press event on August 12, Midway showed a nearly finalized build of the game, revealing that depending which moral path the player is on, one of the boss fights will be different - the good moral path will see Torque face Copperfield, a slave trader, while the bad moral path will see him face The Creeper, a pimp who brutalized and murdered his girls.

On September 8, 2017, both The Suffering and The Suffering: Ties That Bind were released on GOG.com as DRM-free titles.

== Reception ==
Reception

Aggregate score
Aggregator	Score		
Aggregator	PC	PS2	Xbox
Metacritic	73/100	75/100	76/100

Review scores
Publication	Score		
Publication	PC	PS2	Xbox
Eurogamer		7/10	
Game Informer			8.5/10
GameSpot	7.2/10	7.2/10	7.2/10
GameSpy	3/5	3.5/5	3.5/5
IGN	8.1/10	8.1/10	8.1/10
Official U.S. PlayStation Magazine		3.5/5	
Official Xbox Magazine (US)			8.6/10
PC Gamer (US)	89%		

Ties That Bind received favourable reviews, but was generally seen as inferior to the original game. The PC version holds an aggregate score of 73 out of 100 on Metacritic, based on twenty reviews; the PlayStation 2 version 75 out of 100, based on thirty-seven reviews; the Xbox version 76 out of 100, based on thirty-six reviews.

GameSpy's David Chapman scored the PlayStation 2 and Xbox versions 3.5 out of 5. Of the graphics, he wrote "there haven't been a lot of improvements over the original game. Placed side-by-side, players would be somewhat hard pressed to guess which game was the newer release." He was critical of the lack of differentiation between the game and its predecessor, arguing "it feels more like an expansion than a true sequel. If you've played the first game, Ties That Bind simply feels like more of the same." However, he concluded "The Suffering: Ties That Bind is a solid action title that should satisfy fans of the original game. Although the game doesn't bring a lot of new experiences to the table, it does do a great job of adding to the experience gamers enjoyed the first time around." Scott Osborne scored the PC version 3 out of 5, writing "the gameplay feels stuck in the past, like a rerun of the first game." He was critical of the port, citing "graphics glitches," "problems loading saved games," and game-breaking bugs. He concluded, "The gameplay and locales aren't particularly exciting, yet the pacing is taut, and the story and acting are above par. Fans of the first game should enjoy learning more about Torque's clouded life, but if you're new to the series, you're probably better off picking up the original."

Eurogamer's Ellie Gibson scored the PlayStation 2 version 7 out of 10, writing "this is a sequel which doesn't really move things on much [...] there's not a lot that's new here." She did praise the environments, which she called "diverse, detailed and brilliantly lit," and the enemies, to which she referred as "well designed, with fluid animations and varied attack patterns." She concluded "There's not a lot new here [...] But the good news is that they've managed not to mess up any of the things which made the original so enjoyable [...] This isn't a game that's going to raise any bars, push any envelopes or revolutionise any genres. But if you played and enjoyed the first game and fancy more of the same, The Suffering: Ties That Bind won't disappoint."

GameSpot's Jeff Gerstmann scored the game 7.2 out of 10. He was critical of the general gameplay, which he argued "quickly boils down to you running from room to room, killing anything that pops up along the way." He was also critical of the creature design, which he felt was "largely recycled from last year's game, which is disappointing. The way the monsters in the last game were based on various methods of execution was interesting, but retrofitting them to fit Baltimore street crime seems cheap." He concluded "The Suffering: Ties That Bind has its moments, but most of these moments are the same sorts of moments that you saw in last year's game. If you're a fan of the previous game and you're looking for more of the same, Ties That Bind fits the bill, but more expansion on the themes of the first game would have made for a much more interesting final product."

IGN's Tom McNamara scored the game 8.1 out of 10, writing "Ties That Bind is quite a solid romp, and a cut above most of the games in the genre that are marred by poor controls, poor balancing, annoying music, bad voice acting, thin stories, and a host of other problems that define the vast middle ground. Surreal Software has a very clear and detailed vision of the location and the people and tortured souls that populate it, an intuitive and smooth control scheme, and a dripping, engaging atmosphere of unpredictable nightmare." Like other critics, however, he felt the game didn't build on the original sufficiently; "it doesn't do a whole lot to expand on the theme of the original -- nightmare prison visions come alive, ghosts that kill, and churning violence [...] Still, if you liked the original, you should like Ties That Bind."

Game Informer's Jeremy Zoss scored the Xbox version 8.5 out of 10, calling the game "one of the most interesting and engaging action titles of the year." He praised the maturity shown by the game in presenting its themes; "Poverty, drug and domestic abuse, slavery, and mental illness are all explored, and none of these issues are ever exploited or treated lightly. Ties That Bind is also the only game I've ever seen that features an Islamic character that isn't a terrorist or a villain. On the flip side, Ties That Bind is twisted and violent, and features some language that will make even those with the foulest potty mouths wince." He concluded, "It is simultaneously fun and extremely frustrating, compelling and flawed, mature and foul, engaging and confusing. As a game, it can be aggravating, but as a piece of interactive storytelling, it flirts with brilliance."

=== Sales ===
Ties That Bind did not sell as well as expected, and sold significantly less than the original game. In November 2005, Midway announced it would miss its quarterly expectations, specifically citing poor sales of Ties That Bind and L.A. Rush. Midway expected to hit its $30 million revenue target, but expected losses to reach $29 million instead of the previously anticipated $19 million, blaming increased product development costs. For the fiscal year, their revenue expectations dropped from $200 million to $145 million, with expected losses of $95 million. The company ultimately reported a $29.1 million quarterly loss on revenues of $29.5 million.

== Film ==
On September 8, 2005, Midway and MTV Films announced a film adaptation based on both The Suffering and The Suffering: Ties That Bind was in development. Stan Winston had signed on to work on the project, with producers Jason Lust and Rick Jacobs. No writers, actors or directors had yet been approached. However, there have since been no further developments, with the project presumably cancelled.
