= Drakan: Order of the Flame =

1999 video game

- Developer: Surreal Software
- Publisher: Psygnosis
- Producer: Stephen Patterson
- Designer: Alan Patmore
- Programmer: Stuart Denman
- Artist: Mike Nichols
- Composers: Barry Leitch; Tim Ebling
- Platform: Windows
- Release: NA: August 20, 1999; UK: September 11, 1999
- Genre: Action-adventure
- Modes: Single-player, multiplayer

Drakan: Order of the Flame is an action-adventure video game developed by Surreal Software and published by Psygnosis in 1999. The game follows Rynn, a young woman with extraordinary martial skills, and an ancient dragon Arokh on their quest to free Rynn's younger brother from the evil sorcerer Navaros. The gameplay alternates between dungeon exploration and hack and slash when Rynn is alone and aerial dogfights when she mounts Arokh. A sequel, Drakan: The Ancients' Gates, was released in 2002.

== Gameplay ==
The gameplay of Drakan primarily consists of exploring vast locations and battling enemies. The player navigates Rynn from third-person perspective, using the keyboard and mouse. On open-air locations, Arokh follows Rynn either by flying or by walking if he can land nearby. In the latter case, he also allows Rynn to mount him at any time, whereupon the control switches to him. When navigating Arokh, the player cannot use any of Rynn's items except potions, but has a variety of ranged weapons the dragon acquires throughout the game, starting with his innate fire breathing. When in the air, Rynn and Arokh are superior to any non-aerial enemy, but to defeat flying monsters, the player must maneuver and aim precisely. Dismounting is only possible when landed.

The large open-air locations contain entrances to smaller dungeons, which Arokh usually cannot enter because of his size, so Rynn has to explore them alone. When controlling Rynn, the player can equip her with swords, daggers, maces, battle axes, bows, and armour that she picks up throughout the game. The inventory is limited in size, and most weapons wear down when used and cannot be repaired. In addition to normal weapons, there are magical ones, as well as potions, bow arrows, and quest-related items. No special in-game skills are required for Rynn to equip any weapon or armour she picks up, and the player can use acrobatics to gain tactical advantage in combat. The game was rated "Mature" by the Entertainment Software Rating Board for "animated violence, blood, and gore" because of its realistic depiction of dismemberment, decapitation, and gibbing of the enemies.

When not in combat, the player has to solve puzzles to progress the story or complete side-quests to obtain special artifacts like unique armour and weapons.

== Plot ==
The story begins with Rynn and her brother Delon caught in a surprise attack by a pack of Wartoks, orc-like creatures serving evil sorcerer Navaros. Rynn is injured and left for dead and Delon is kidnapped. She survives, however, and returns to her village to find it burned down by Navaros's minions. A mortally wounded village elder instructs her to seek out the dragon Arokh and resurrect the legendary Order of the Flame, an ancient organization of dragon-riding knights who battled evil and disappeared after it had seemingly been defeated. Rynn finds Arokh in an ancient cave and uses the crystal of Arokh's former rider Heron to awaken him from his statue-like sleep. Reluctantly, Arokh agrees to merge their existences into one through a magical ritual called the Bond. Gameplay-wise, the Bond allows Rynn to mount Arokh and makes them share their hit points so that when one of them is killed, the other dies, too.

Rynn and Arokh journey across the world of Drakan, solving various challenges, and after countless battles, discover that the minions of Navaros plan to use Delon's body as a host for the evil sorcerer's resurrection. Rynn has to fight the possessed Delon and wins, but Navaros leaves his body and escapes. The final boss of the game is Navaros's four-headed dragon Kaeros whom Rynn and Arokh must fight together. The game ends with a cliffhanger, showing Delon falling into the abyss, and Rynn and Arokh following him.

== Development ==
The game was showcased at E3 1998.

== Reception ==
Reception

Aggregate score
Aggregator	Score
GameRankings	81%

Review scores
Publication	Score
AllGame	4.5/5
CNET Gamecenter	8/10
Computer Games Strategy Plus	4/5
Computer Gaming World	4/5
Edge	7/10
GamePro	4/5
GameRevolution	B−
GameSpot	7.5/10
GameZone	7.3/10
IGN	8.1/10
Next Generation	4/5
PC Accelerator	7/10
PC Gamer (US)	69%
The Cincinnati Enquirer	3/4

The game received favorable reviews according to the review aggregation website GameRankings. Jeff Lundrigan of NextGen said, "It's not quite the end-all and be-all we'd hoped for, but this is still great, great stuff."

In a review in the February 2000 issue of InQuest Gamer, Dan DiGiacomo states that Rynn's "movement is rather sluggish" and that the dragon-riding is a "cool concept executed with moderate success". He also states that the game has some innovate features, including "a cool inventory system" and a "well-planned map updating feature".

The game sold 180,000 copies.

== Sequel ==
A sequel, Drakan: The Ancients' Gates, was released in 2002 for PlayStation 2.
