= Stan Winston =

American special effects artist (1946–2008)

- Winston at the 1997 Cannes Film Festival
- Born: Stanley Winston; April 7, 1946; Richmond, Virginia, U.S.
- Died: June 15, 2008 (aged 62); Malibu, California, U.S.
- Resting place: Hillside Memorial Park Cemetery
- Occupation: Special effects artist
- Years active: 1972–2008
- Spouse: Karen Winston (m. 1969)
- Children: 2, including Matt Winston

Stanley Winston (April 7, 1946 – June 15, 2008) was an American television and film special make-up effects artist, best known for his work on the Terminator franchise, the Jurassic Park trilogy, Aliens, The Thing, the first two installments of the Predator franchise, Inspector Gadget, Iron Man and Edward Scissorhands. He won a quartet of Academy Awards for his work.

Winston, a frequent collaborator with directors James Cameron, Steven Spielberg and Tim Burton, owned several effects studios, including Digital Domain and Stan Winston Digital. The established areas of expertise for Winston were in makeup, puppets and practical effects, but at the time of his death, he had expanded his studio to encompass digital effects as well.

== Early life ==
Winston was born on April 7, 1946, in Richmond, Virginia to a Jewish family, where he graduated from Washington-Lee High School in 1964. He studied painting and sculpture at the University of Virginia in Charlottesville, from which he graduated in 1968.

== Career ==
In 1969, after attending California State University, Long Beach, Winston moved to Hollywood to pursue a career as an actor. Struggling to find an acting job, he began a makeup apprenticeship at Walt Disney Studios.

=== 1970s ===
In 1972, Winston established his own company, Stan Winston Studio, and in 1973, he won an Emmy Award for his effects work on the 1972 telefilm Gargoyles. Over the next seven years, Winston continued to receive Emmy Award nominations for work on projects and won another for 1974's The Autobiography of Miss Jane Pittman. Winston also created the Wookiee costumes for the 1978 Star Wars Holiday Special. In 1978, Winston was the Special Make-up Designer for The Wiz.

=== 1980s ===
In 1982, Winston received his first Oscar nomination for Heartbeeps, by which time he had set up his own studio. However, it was his ground-breaking work with Rob Bottin on his update of the science fiction horror classic The Thing that year that brought him to prominence in Hollywood. He also worked on supervised vision work on The Entity. Between then, he contributed some special effects to Friday the 13th Part III, in which he made a slightly different head sculpt of Jason in an unused ending.

In 1983, Winston designed the Mr. Roboto facemask for the American rock group Styx.

In 1983 he also worked on the short-lived television series Manimal, for which he created the panther and hawk transformation effects.

Winston reached a new level of fame in 1984 when James Cameron's The Terminator premiered. The movie was a surprise hit, and Winston's work in bringing the titular metallic killing machine to life led to many new projects and additional collaborations with Cameron. In fact, Winston won his first Academy Award for Best Visual Effects in 1986 on James Cameron's next movie, Aliens.

Over the next few years, Winston and his company received more accolades for its work on many more Hollywood films, including Tim Burton's Edward Scissorhands, John McTiernan's Predator, Alien Nation, The Monster Squad, and Predator 2.

In 1988, Winston made his directorial debut with the horror movie Pumpkinhead, and won Best First Time Director at the Paris Film Festival. His next directing project was the child-friendly A Gnome Named Gnorm (1990), starring Anthony Michael Hall.

=== 1990s ===
James Cameron drafted Winston and his team once again in 1990, this time for Terminator 2: Judgment Day. T2 premiered in the summer of 1991, and Winston's work on this box office hit won him two more Academy Awards for Best Makeup and Best Visual Effects.

In 1992, he was nominated for another Tim Burton film, the superhero sequel Batman Returns, where he designed the makeup prosthetics for Danny DeVito's Penguin. Additionally, his studio was commissioned to create robotic penguin puppets that were used throughout the film.

Winston turned his attention from super villains and cyborgs to dinosaurs when Steven Spielberg enlisted his help to bring Michael Crichton's Jurassic Park to the cinema screen. In 1993, the movie became a blockbuster and Winston won another Oscar for Best Visual Effects.

In 1993, Winston, Cameron and ex-ILM General Manager Scott Ross co-founded Digital Domain, one of the foremost digital and visual effects studios in the world. In 1998, after the box office success of Titanic, Cameron and Winston severed their working relationship with the company and resigned from its board of directors.

Winston and his team continued to provide effects work for many more films and expanded their work into animatronics. Some of Winston's notable animatronics work can be found in The Ghost and the Darkness and T2-3D: Battle Across Time, James Cameron's 3-D continuation of the Terminator series for the Universal Studios theme parks. One of Winston's most ambitious animatronics projects was Steven Spielberg's A.I. Artificial Intelligence, which earned Winston another Oscar nomination for Best Visual Effects.

In 1996, Winston directed and co-produced the longest music video of all time, Ghosts, which was based on an original concept of Michael Jackson and Stephen King. The long-form music video presented a number of never before seen visual effects, and promoted music from Blood on the Dance Floor: HIStory in the Mix, which went on to become the biggest selling remix album of all time (13 million).

=== 2000s ===
In 2001, Winston, together with Colleen Camp and Samuel Z. Arkoff's son, Lou Arkoff, produced a series of made-for-cable films for Cinemax and HBO. The five films, referred to as Creature Features, were inspired by the titles of AIP monster movies from the 1950s — i.e., Earth vs. the Spider (1958), How to Make a Monster (1958), Day the World Ended (1955), The She-Creature (1956), and Teenage Caveman (1958) — but had completely different plots. two reasons Stan Winston did this was because he'd had worked with AIP in their last years providing special effects for The Bat People (1974) and start a toy line with action figures from the aforementioned four film remakes.

In 2002 Winston helped to launch a new comic line, Stan Winston's Realm Of The Claw / Mutant Earth which was a flip book and ran for 4 issues. Stan Winston's Trakk Monster Hunter came out in 2003 and ran for 2 issues. These were published by Image Comics.

In 2003, Winston was invited by the Smithsonian Institution to speak about his life and career in a public presentation sponsored by The Lemelson Center for the Study of Invention and Innovation. The presentation took place on November 15, 2003, at the Smithsonian's National Museum of American History.

Winston also worked on Terminator 3: Rise of the Machines.

By April 2003, Winston was working on his next project, Jurassic Park IV. By April 2005, Winston said the film was on hold. The film would eventually be released in 2015 titled Jurassic World.

At the time of his death, Winston was working on the fourth Terminator film, Terminator Salvation, as well as frequent collaborator James Cameron's film Avatar. Winston designed the original monsters that appeared in the Midway game The Suffering and its sequel, The Suffering: Ties That Bind.

== Death ==
Stan Winston died on June 15, 2008, in Malibu, California, after suffering for seven years from multiple myeloma. A spokeswoman reported that he "died peacefully at home surrounded by family." Winston was with his wife and two children, actor Matt Winston and Debbie Winston. Arnold Schwarzenegger made a public speech about his death, and Jon Favreau dedicated his Spike TV Scream Award to him upon receiving the award for Best Sci-Fi Movie for Iron Man. Terminator Salvation is dedicated to both Winston and Joseph R. Kubicek Sr, with the dedication appearing at both the beginning and end of the film. After his death, his four supervisors (Shane Mahan, John Rosengrant, Alan Scott, Lindsay Macgowan) founded and built their own studio, Legacy Effects, named to honor his memory. A private funeral was held for Winston at Hillside Memorial Park.

== Stan Winston School ==
In 2009, the year after his death, the Winston family founded the Stan Winston School of Character Arts to "preserve Stan's legacy by inspiring and fostering creativity in a new generation of character creators.” The school, which is 100% online, currently offers hundreds of in-depth, on-demand educational video courses by Hollywood's leading special effects artists and creators. Topics covered include design, sculpture, mold making, lab work, animatronics, makeup effects, puppet making, painting, and fabrication.

== Collaborators ==
Winston worked with the following directors on more than one film:

- Tim Burton (Edward Scissorhands, Batman Returns, Big Fish)
- James Cameron (The Terminator, Aliens, Terminator 2: Judgment Day, Avatar)
- John Carpenter (The Thing, Starman)
- Dennis Dugan (The Benchwarmers, You Don't Mess with the Zohan)
- Jon Favreau (Zathura: A Space Adventure, Iron Man)
- Stephen Hopkins (Predator 2, The Ghost and the Darkness)
- Peter Hyams (The Relic, End of Days)
- Frank Marshall (Congo, Eight Below)
- Steven Spielberg (Jurassic Park, The Lost World: Jurassic Park, A.I. Artificial Intelligence, War of the Worlds, Indiana Jones and the Kingdom of the Crystal Skull)
- Robert Zemeckis (Amazing Stories episode "Go to the Head of the Class", What Lies Beneath)

== Academy Awards ==
- 1982: Oscar Nomination for Best Makeup: Heartbeeps
- 1987: Won Oscar for Best Visual Effects: Aliens
- 1988: Oscar Nomination for Best Visual Effects: Predator
- 1991: Oscar Nomination for Best Makeup: Edward Scissorhands
- 1992: Won 2 Oscars – Best Visual Effects & Best Makeup: Terminator 2: Judgment Day
- 1993: Oscar Nomination for Best Makeup: Batman Returns
- 1994: Won Oscar for Best Visual Effects: Jurassic Park
- 1998: Oscar Nomination for Best Visual Effects: The Lost World: Jurassic Park
- 2002: Oscar Nomination for Best Visual Effects: A.I. Artificial Intelligence

== Emmy Awards ==
- 1973: Won Emmy for Outstanding Achievement in Makeup: Gargoyles
- 1974: Won Emmy for Outstanding Achievement in Makeup: The Autobiography of Miss Jane Pittman

== Filmography ==
- Gargoyles (1972)
- The Autobiography of Miss Jane Pittman (1974)
- The Bat People (1974)
- The Man in the Glass Booth (1975)
- Pinocchio (TV, 1976)
- Dr. Black, Mr. Hyde (1976)
- Dracula's Dog (1977, also known as Zoltan...Hound of Dracula)
- The Wiz (1978)
- Star Wars Holiday Special (TV Special) (1978)
- The Two Worlds of Jennie Logan (1979)
- The Exterminator (1980)
- Heartbeeps (1981)
- Dead & Buried (1981)
- The Entity (1982)
- Friday the 13th Part III (1982) (uncredited)
- The Thing (1982)
- The Terminator (1984)
- Starman (1984)
- Ghoulies (1985)
- The Vindicator (1986)
- Invaders from Mars (1986)
- Aliens (1986)
- The Monster Squad (1987)
- Predator (1987)
- Pumpkinhead (1988)
- Leviathan (1989)
- Edward Scissorhands (1990)
- A Gnome Named Gnorm (1990)
- Predator 2 (1990)
- Terminator 2: Judgment Day (1991)
- Batman Returns (1992)
- Jurassic Park (1993)
- Interview with the Vampire (1994)
- Tank Girl (1995)
- Congo (1995)
- The Ghost and the Darkness (1996)
- The Island of Dr. Moreau (1996)
- T2-3D: Battle Across Time (1996)
- Michael Jackson's Ghosts (1996)
- The Relic (1997)
- The Lost World: Jurassic Park (1997)
- Mouse Hunt (1997)
- Small Soldiers (1998)
- Instinct (1999)
- Lake Placid (1999)
- Inspector Gadget (1999)
- End of Days (1999)
- Galaxy Quest (1999)
- What Lies Beneath (2000)
- Pearl Harbor (2001)
- A.I. Artificial Intelligence (2001)
- Jurassic Park III (2001)
- She Creature (2001)
- Earth vs. the Spider (2001)
- How to Make a Monster (2001)
- The Day the World Ended (2001)
- The Time Machine (2002)
- Teenage Caveman (2002)
- Darkness Falls (2003)
- Big Fish (2003)
- Terminator 3: Rise of the Machines (2003)
- Wrong Turn (2003)
- The Suffering (video game) (2004)
- Constantine (2005)
- War of the Worlds (2005)
- The Suffering: Ties That Bind (video game) (2005)
- Doom (2005)
- Zathura: A Space Adventure (2005)
- Eight Below (2006)
- The Shaggy Dog (2006)
- The Benchwarmers (2006)
- Skinwalkers (2006)
- The Deaths of Ian Stone (2007)
- Iron Man (2008)
- Indiana Jones and the Kingdom of the Crystal Skull (2008)
- You Don't Mess with the Zohan (2008)
- Terminator Salvation (2009)
- G.I. Joe: The Rise of Cobra (2009)
- Pandorum (2009)
- Avatar (2009)
- Shutter Island (2010)
- Enthiran (2010)
