= List of multiplayer online battle arena games =

This is a list of multiplayer online battle arena games, sorted chronologically. Information regarding date of release, developer, platform, setting and notability is provided when available.

== List ==
Year	Game	Developer	Platform	Free-to-play	Still playable	Notes
1989	Herzog Zwei	Technosoft	Sega Genesis	No	No	Herzog Zwei has been cited as an inspiration to the developers of Warcraft, StarCraft, Dune II, and Command & Conquer and is also considered a precursor to the MOBA genre.
1998	Future Cop: LAPD	EA Redwood Shores	PlayStation, Windows, Mac OS	No	No	Future Cop: LAPD is well known for inspiring MOBA games like DotA and League of Legends.
2003	Defense of the Ancients	Eul, Guinsoo, IceFrog	Windows, Mac	See Notes	Yes	Custom map that requires installation of Warcraft III: Reign of Chaos or Warcraft III: The Frozen Throne.
2008	Minions	Casual Collective	Browser	Yes	Discontinued	Discontinued with the demise of Flash on December 21, 2020.
2009	Avalon Heroes	WeMade Entertainment	Windows	Yes	Discontinued	Officially shut down on February 8, 2013.
2009	Demigod	Gas Powered Games	Windows	No	Yes	First commercial game inspired by DotA.
2009	League of Legends	Riot Games	Windows, Mac	Yes	Yes	
2010	Heroes of Newerth	S2 Games, Frostburn Studios	Windows, Mac, Linux	Yes	Discontinued	Became free to play in July 2011. Servers shut down June 19, 2022. Garena bought the rights of the game from S2 in May 2015 and founded Frostburn Studios to maintain it.
2010	Monday Night Combat	Uber Entertainment	Windows, Xbox 360	No	Yes	
2010	Realm of the Titans	Ningbo Shengguang Tianyi	Windows	Yes	Discontinued	Discontinued in all regions except China.
2011	Bloodline Champions	Stunlock Studios	Windows	Yes	Yes	
2011	Rise of Immortals: Battle for Graxia	Petroglyph Games	Windows	Yes	Discontinued	Officially shut down since June 2013.
2012	Awesomenauts	Ronimo Games	Windows, Mac, Linux, Xbox 360, PS3, PS4, Xbox One	No	Yes	2D sidescrolling MOBA game.
2012	Guardians of Middle-earth	Monolith Productions	Xbox 360, PS3, Windows	No	Yes	Game based around The Lord of the Rings film series. No longer available on PlayStation Store and Steam.
2012	Super Monday Night Combat	Uber Entertainment	Windows	Yes	Discontinued	
2012	Warhammer Online: Wrath of Heroes	Mythic Entertainment	Windows	Yes	Discontinued	Officially shut down on March 29, 2013.
2013	Dota 2	Valve	Windows, Mac, Linux	Yes	Yes	Sequel to Defense of the Ancients.
2013	Panzar	Panzar Studio	Windows	Yes	Yes	
2014	Adventure Time: Battle Party	Cartoon Network	Browser	Yes	Discontinued	MOBA based on TV seriesAdventure Time.
2014	Dawngate	Waystone Games	Windows	Yes	Discontinued	Officially shut down since March 2015.
2014	Fates Forever	Hammer and Chisel	iOS	Yes	Discontinued	Officially shut down since October 2015.
2014	Prime World	Nival	Windows	Yes	Discontinued	Shut down on March 31, 2021.
2014	Vainglory	Super Evil Megacorp	iOS, Android, Windows	Yes	Yes	Announced in November 2014
2014	Smite	Hi-Rez Studios	Windows, Xbox One, PS4	Yes	Yes	MOBA based around different cultures spiritual entities and in over-the-shoulder Third Person perspective.
2015	Heroes of the Storm	Blizzard Entertainment	Windows, Mac	Yes	Yes	The game brings various Blizzard characters together as playable heroes, as well as different battlegrounds based on Warcraft, Diablo, StarCraft, and Overwatch universes.
2015	Infinite Crisis	Turbine, Inc.	Windows	Yes	Discontinued	Officially shut down as of August 14, 2015.
2015	Sins of a Dark Age	Ironclad Games	Windows	Yes	Discontinued	
2015	Strife	S2 Games	Windows, Mac, Linux	Yes	Discontinued	Released May 22, 2015. Servers became inaccessible in September 2018.
2015	Arena of Fate	Crytek Black Sea	Windows	Yes	Discontinued	Last known state was Closed Beta in 2016. The developers were purchased by SEGA in 2017.
2015	Honor of Kings	TiMi Studio Group	iOS, Android	Yes	Yes	Released November 26, 2015. Released internationally in 2017 as Arena of Valor.
2016	Paragon	Epic Games	Windows, PlayStation 4	Yes	Discontinued	MOBA in third person perspective. Servers shut down on April 26, 2018.
2016	Warhammer 40,000: Dark Nexus Arena	Whitebox Interactive	Windows	Yes	Discontinued	Officially shut down on March 31, 2016.
2016	Mobile Legends: Bang Bang	Moonton	iOS, Android	Yes	Yes	Released July 14, 2016.
2017	Star Wars: Force Arena	Netmarble	iOS, Android	Yes	Discontinued	Released January 12, 2017. In-app purchases disabled as of December 19, 2018. No longer accepting new players as of January 17, 2019, and servers were permanently shut down on March 18, 2019.
2017	Arena of Valor	TiMi Studio Group	iOS, Android, Nintendo Switch	Yes	Yes	Released August 10, 2017.
2017	Battlerite	Stunlock Studios	Windows	Yes	Yes	Released November 8, 2017.
2017	Gigantic	Motiga	Windows, Xbox One	Yes	Discontinued	The game focuses on team-based action combat in a third-person perspective with heroes battling alongside a massive guardian. Officially shut down on July 31, 2018.
2017	Master X Master	NCSOFT	Windows	Yes	Discontinued	Officially shut down January 31, 2018.
2018	AirMech	Carbon Games	Windows, Google Chrome	Yes	Yes	Inspired by Herzog Zwei.
2019	Marvel Super War	NetEase Games	iOS, Android	Yes	No	Officially shut down on June 18, 2024.
2020	Bleeding Edge	Ninja Theory	Windows, Xbox One	No	Yes	Team brawler video game. Ninja Theory announced that there would no longer be any content updates, but the game is still playable on Xbox and PC.
2020	Eternal Return	Nimble Neuron	Windows	Yes	Yes	MOBA with battle royale mechanics.
2020	League of Legends: Wild Rift	Riot Games	iOS, Android, consoles	Yes	Yes	Modified version of League of Legends for mobile and consoles.
2021	Pokémon Unite	TiMi Studio Group	iOS, Android, Nintendo Switch	Yes	Yes	Pokémon themed MOBA developed in partnership with Tencent Games
2024	Predecessor	Omeda Studios/S	Windows, Xbox Series X/S, PlayStation 4, PlayStation 5	Yes	Yes	More information needed
2025	Smite 2	Hi-Rez Studios	Microsoft Windows, PlayStation 5, Xbox Series X/S, Steam Deck	Yes	Yes	Sequel of Smite.
2025	Dragon Ball: Gekishin Squadra	Bandai Namco	Microsoft Windows, Playstation 4, Playstation 5, Nintendo Switch, iOS, Android	Yes	Yes	Released September 10, 2025.
TBD	Deadlock	Valve Corporation	Microsoft Windows	Yes	Yes	In Early Access since May 2024. (Invite Only).
