= Scott Manley =

Scottish-American astrophysicist (born 1972)

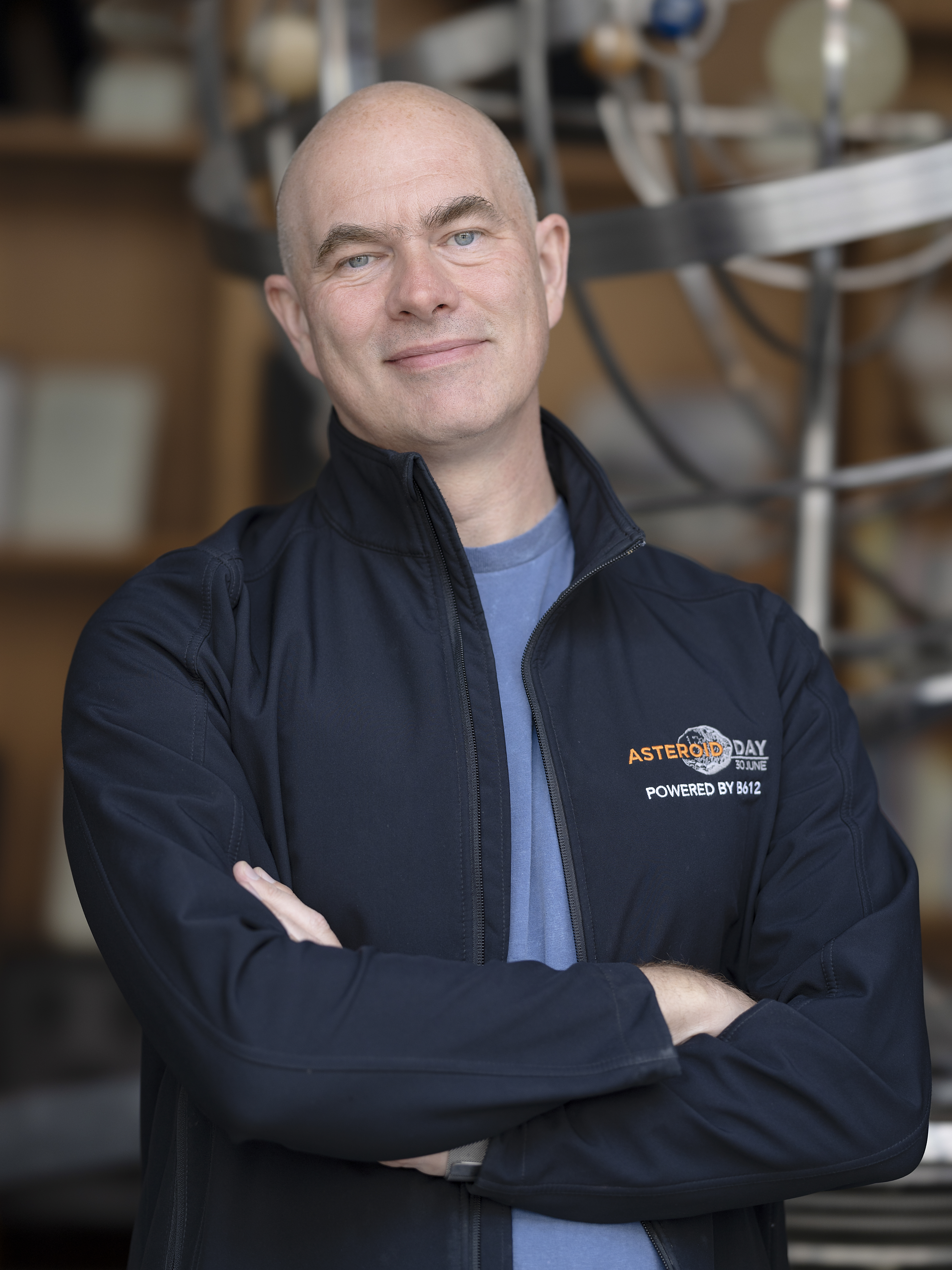
- Manley in 2022
- Born: Scott Park Manley; 31 December 1972 (age 53); Troon, South Ayrshire, Scotland
- Education: University of Glasgow

YouTube information
- Channel: Scott Manley
- Years active: 2009–present
- Subscribers: 1.9 million
- Views: 750 million
- Last updated: 12 April 2026

Scott Park Manley (born 31 December 1972) is a Scottish-American science communication YouTuber, gamer, astrophysicist, and programmer. On his YouTube channel, he makes videos discussing space-related topics and news, mainly concerning up-to-date rocket science developments. He also plays space-themed video games, most notably Kerbal Space Program, while using his physics background to teach science concepts.

Manley is known among his followers as the "astronogamer", as he is one of the few YouTubers blending both video games and science, and is popular in the niche community of space enthusiasts and gamers, especially among players of the space flight simulation game Kerbal Space Program.

== Education and professional career ==
Manley was born on 31 December 1972, and he grew up in Barassie, a suburb of Troon, South Ayrshire, in Scotland. While studying at the University of Glasgow, Manley received a Bachelor of Science (1990–1994) in physics and astronomy, focusing on asteroid belt populations, and a Master of Science (1994–1995) in computational physics. For five years he lived in Ireland and Northern Ireland. In 2002, he worked as an engineer for Napster. From 2002 to 2004, he worked as a research engineer for Qualys. From 2004 to 2009, he worked as a security architect in imeem, where he developed and maintained an audio and video uploading, transcoding, and fingerprinting system, among other things. Manley joined Topsy Labs in 2009, which was acquired in 2013 by Apple Inc. where he worked as a software developer until 2025.

== YouTube career ==
Manley's first few uploads on his YouTube channel, "szyzyg", were assorted home movies that were primarily of his daughter, Skye, some of which involved her playing the game EVE Online.

A video titled "Asteroid Discovery From 1980 - 2010" was one of Manley's early YouTube successes. The video is a computer animation showing a time-lapse of the Solar System from 1980 to 2010. When the time-lapse reaches the day an asteroid is discovered, it appears on the map as a bright green dot and continues orbiting the Sun. The video amassed over 459,000 views in the five days following its upload. By 3 September 2010, the szyzyg channel had 213 subscribers, earning Manley the accolade "#66 - Most Viewed (This Week)".

Some time before 23 November 2011, he changed the name of his YouTube channel to "Scott Manley". Manley's later successes came from gaming content, specifically videos about Kerbal Space Program, a spaceflight simulator with semiaccurate Newtonian physics. Kerbal Space Program is a sandbox game featuring players constructing rockets out of prefabricated parts, attempting to launch them into orbit and explore the solar system of Kerbin. The game has a very steep learning curve due to the accurate Newtonian physics engine. Manley used his scientific background to make tutorial videos on basic gameplay, such as how to reach Kerbin orbit. Later, Manley would go on to play other games such as Elite Dangerous, EVE Online, Surviving Mars and Kerbal Space Program 2, approaching them from his unique professional science perspective.

Around 2018, Manley slowly transitioned away from gaming content, and began focusing heavily on the history of spaceflight and current events in the industry. As of 2022, these subjects are his current main focus, alongside regular Q&A videos submitted by his patrons on Patreon. Manley still streams games weekly on Twitch under the name "Szyzyg".

From 2022 to 2023, Manley uploaded an irregular series of vlogs documenting his progress in obtaining a private pilot license, becoming certified in April 2023. He successfully obtained his instrument rating in 2026 and also owns an Aerospool WT9 Dynamic light sport aircraft which appears in a number of videos.

Author Anne McCaffrey consulted with Manley on the effects of asteroid impacts while writing The Skies of Pern. Manley determined the orbit of a fictional rogue comet and provided advice on how the event should be portrayed. Manley was one of the original participants of Asteroid Day, was a keynote speaker at the launch in 2015, and hosted their regular "Asteroid Update" segments. He is credited as a consultant on the Netflix movie Stowaway (directed by Joe Penna). In Penna's appearance on Corridor Cast, he said Manley would go beyond the immediate needs of the script and that he 'did the math so it would be ready'.

== Recognition ==
In recognition of his work as a popular science communicator, asteroid 33434 Scottmanley was named after him. The official naming citation was published by the Minor Planet Center on 18 May 2019 (M.P.C. 114954). The outer main-belt asteroid was discovered by astronomers with the OCA–DLR Asteroid Survey in 1999. It is a member of the stony Koronis family and measures approximately 4.6 kilometres (2.9 mi) in diameter.

== See also ==
- Tim Dodd, another YouTuber who makes videos about spaceflight
