= SMNC =

SMNC may refer to:

- Super Monday Night Combat, a 2012 third-person shooter video game
- Survival of motor neuron centromeric, a gene involved in the assembly of snRNPs
