= Wayward Sky =

2016 action video game

- Logo
- Developer: Uber Entertainment
- Publisher: Uber Entertainment
- Engine: Unity
- Platform: PlayStation 4
- Release: October 10, 2016
- Genre: Action
- Mode: Single-player

Wayward Sky is an action video game by Uber Entertainment for PlayStation VR. It was released in October 2016 alongside the platform's launch.

== Gameplay ==
The player, as the young pilot Bess, adventures to rescue her kidnapped father when their plane crashes into a fortress in the clouds. The player uses the PlayStation Move controllers to point Bess towards where she should go next. Alternatively, the player can jump down to Bess's level to interact with puzzle elements near her. (If the player does not have a Move controller, the standard DualShock 4 controller works as well.) Polygon likened the gameplay to playing with action figures with the occasional opportunity to interact directly with their puzzles.

== Development ==
Early builds of the game, such as the one at Oculus Connect in 2014, had the player look in the direction they would like Bess to travel, and would tap on the headset to send her there. The game director Chandana Ekanayake was prone to motion sickness in virtual reality, and tweaked the motion mechanics to make the travel portions comfortable. Later, Ekanayake was invited to demo the PlayStation VR hardware, and was impressed. Based on the progress of the game and its developed aesthetic, Sony too became interested in the game and offered external funding for the project—which Uber Entertainment, the developers, had needed to supplement the internal funding for their seven-person team. In exchange, the game became an exclusive to Sony's platform. After signing with Sony, the game was completely rebuilt for Sony's platform and its motion controls. It was planned to launch alongside the PlayStation VR hardware.

The Uber team struggled against the constant revision of the nascent virtual reality technology. Sony continued to revise their PlayStation VR headset and the game's engine, Unity, continued to change features related to its virtual reality support. Not knowing how players would respond to the new hardware, Uber made the game's puzzles relatively easier in difficulty, for a comfortable three hours of gameplay. Ekanayake tested the game with his kids and designed its puzzles such that players would not put down their headsets in frustration. The team also discovered that observers near the virtual reality player liked to play along and help solve puzzles by watching a feed of the virtual reality world on the television. Ekanayake added that the game contained Easter eggs that were yet to be discovered. Uber released Wayward Sky alongside the PlayStation VR in October 2016.

== Reception ==
Reception

Aggregate score
Aggregator	Score
Metacritic	72/100

Review scores
Publication	Score
Game Informer	6.5/10
IGN	7.3/10
PlayStation Official Magazine – UK	7/10

The game has received mixed reviews from critics. It has been praised for its world, storytelling methods, and VR implementation. However, the puzzles garnered criticism for their perceived simplicity and repetition. There have also been comments about occasional control issues. The Official UK PlayStation Magazine listed it as the fifteenth-best PS VR game.

== Notes ==
=== Sources ===
- Machkovech, Sam (October 13, 2016). "How Wayward Sky's theatrical principles stand above the VR fray". Ars Technica.
- Grubb, Jeff (June 8, 2016). "Mixed-reality Wayward Sky trailer shows off PlayStation VR's capabilities". VentureBeat.
