= Planetary Annihilation =

Real-time strategy game by Uber Entertainment

- Developers: Uber Entertainment (prior to August 2018); Planetary Annihilation Inc. (since August 2018)
- Publisher: Planetary Annihilation Inc.
- Director: Jon Mavor
- Producers: Marc Scattergood; Jeremy Ables
- Designer: Jon Mavor
- Programmers: Jon Mavor; William Howe-Lott; Michael Robbins
- Artists: Steve Thompson; Ben Golus; Andrew Chistophersen; Aung Oo
- Composer: Howard Mostrom
- Platforms: Microsoft Windows, OS X, Linux
- Release: September 5, 2014
- Genre: Real-time strategy
- Modes: Single-player, multiplayer

Planetary Annihilation is a real-time strategy PC game originally developed by Uber Entertainment, whose staff included several video game industry veterans who worked on Total Annihilation and Supreme Commander. The game was released in 2014, and the stand-alone expansion Planetary Annihilation: Titans was released in 2015.

Since 2018, Planetary Annihilation Inc. maintains development of both Planetary Annihilation and Planetary Annihilation: Titans via ongoing content additions and balance changes.

== Gameplay ==
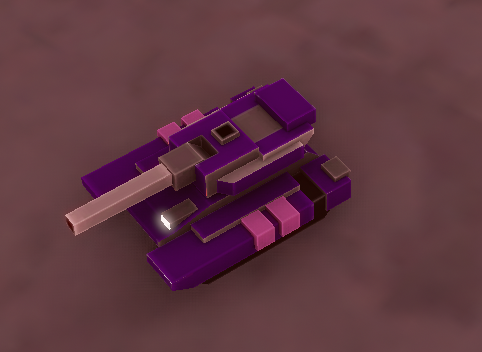
A Tier 1 vehicle unit (Ant) on the surface of a planet

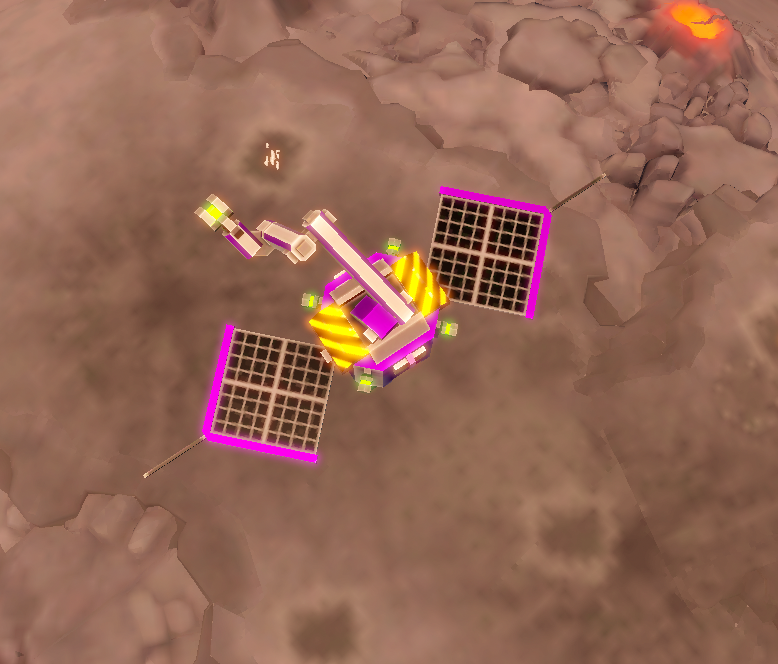
An orbital fabrication unit in orbit

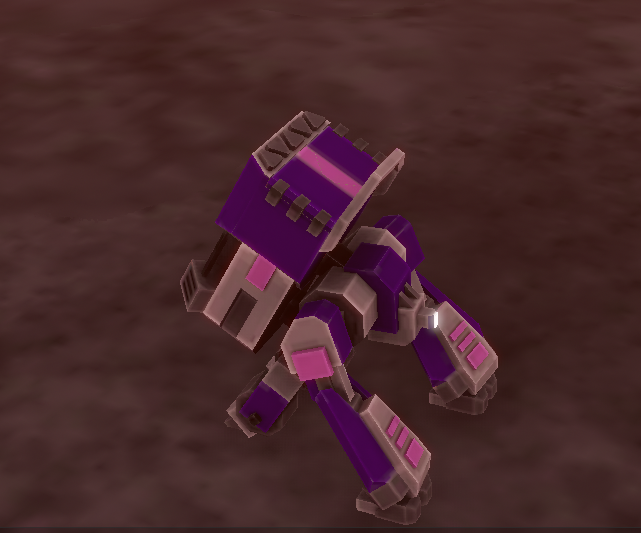
A Tier 2 bot unit (Bluehawk)

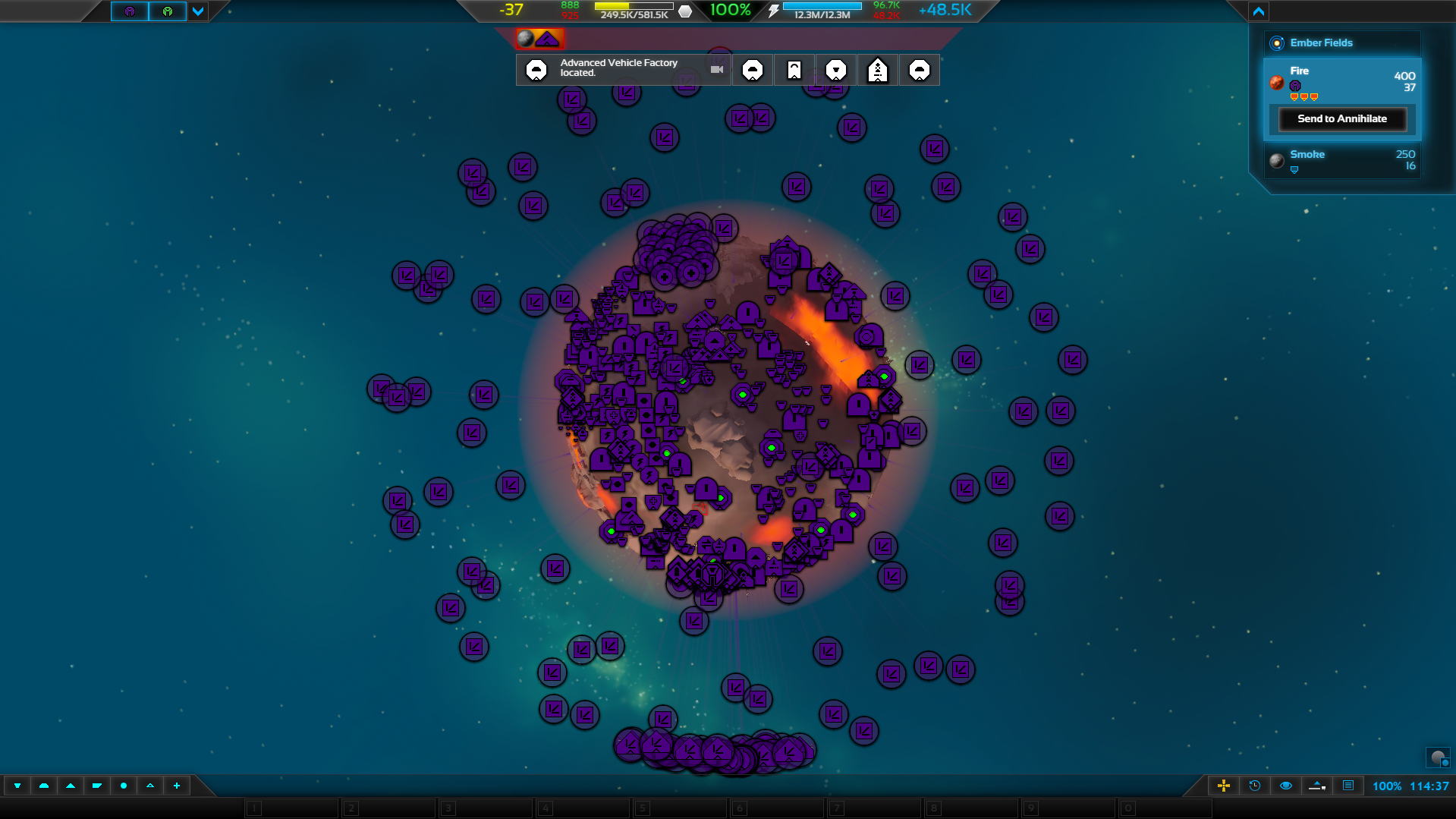
A large base spanning much of a planet's surface

In interviews with PC Gamer and Joystiq, lead developer Jon Mavor explained that the scale and pacing of Planetary Annihilation varies greatly. Matches can be as short as 30-minute skirmishes between two players or extend into long battles spanning multiple worlds with many participants. Although the team aimed to support 40-player matches, this feature was not available at launch.

The game is set across procedurally generated planetary systems containing planets, moons, asteroids and gas giants. Each celestial body has different terrain, biomes and resource distribution. Players can establish control over multiple worlds, defend their holdings or use asteroids and moons as weapons by moving them into enemy planets. Entire planets can also be destroyed through special structures, and matches often involve managing multiple fronts across several worlds.

Gameplay focuses on building an economy, expanding territory and producing units. Each match begins with a Commander unit that can construct Tier 1 economic and military structures. Players use these starting facilities to generate resources and fabricate units and factories that unlock further construction options.

The game’s unit and structure categories include:

- Factories: Tier 1 and Tier 2 factories produce land vehicles, bots, aircraft, naval vessels and orbital units.
- Construction units: Fabrication bots, vehicles, aircraft, ships and orbital units build new structures, reclaim wreckage and assist with production. Advanced versions can construct Tier 2 structures.
- Economy: Resource production is handled through metal extractors and energy plants, with Tier 2 equivalents providing greater output. Other economy-related structures include energy and metal storage buildings, solar arrays and gas giant resource platforms.
- Defensive structures: Defensive options range from walls and mines to laser turrets, torpedo launchers, anti-air cannons, orbital defense weapons, artillery and anti-nuke installations. Tier 2 versions generally cover larger areas or deal more damage than Tier 1.
- Combat units: Vehicles include tanks, artillery and assault units; bots range from fast raiders to mobile artillery and long-range missile platforms. Aircraft perform roles such as reconnaissance, bombing and troop transport. Naval units operate on water-heavy planets and include destroyers, battleships, submarines and carriers. Orbital units and satellites support interplanetary reconnaissance, transportation and attacks.

Late-game strategies often center on planet-scale weapons. Players can construct Halley engines on asteroids or moons to redirect them into other planets. Alternatively, Catalysts can be built on metal planets to activate the Annihilaser, a system-spanning energy weapon capable of destroying entire worlds.

Planetary Annihilation emphasizes large-scale planning rather than detailed control of individual units. This design direction was inspired by the 1997 real-time strategy game Total Annihilation. The developers set a target of supporting up to one million active units during matches.

A match concludes when a player's final Commander is destroyed.

== Development ==
Jon Mavor wrote the graphics engine for Total Annihilation and was also the lead programmer on Supreme Commander. The game's art style was created by Steve Thompson, who also previously worked on Total Annihilation and Supreme Commander. Voice actor John Patrick Lowrie, who did all the narrations for Total Annihilation, did the narrations for Planetary Annihilation as well.

According to Mavor, while game visualization began in May 2012, three months prior to the game's public announcement, the game concept itself had been in development for approximately three years by that time. Additionally, the server and game engine technologies that would underpin the game had been in development for several years prior to the game's public reveal, with some of the server technology having already made its way into PlayFab, Uber Entertainment's back-end server network.

=== Kickstarter funding ===
Rather than pursue investor funding, Planetary Annihilation's developer Uber Entertainment chose to use the crowdfunding site Kickstarter for their financial backing. They revealed the game to the public in August 2012, with their Kickstarter funding goal set at $900,000. At the campaign's conclusion on September 14, Planetary Annihilation had raised approximately $2,228,000 via Kickstarter and an additional $101,000 via PayPal.

Kickstarter featured Planetary Annihilation as the 11th Kickstarter project to have raised over a million dollars, using it to highlight the successes that games had been enjoying on the site.

=== Acquisition ===
In August 2018, a new company Planetary Annihilation Inc., formed from original PA developers and Kickstarter backers, acquired the rights to Planetary Annihilation and Planetary Annihilation: Titans. As of February 2021, the game still receives support in the form of balance changes, and several new units have been added. In addition, PA Inc. continues to support tournaments and seasonal events.

== Release ==
The Alpha was launched on June 8, 2013 for alpha-level backers, with Steam Early Access released on June 13.

The Beta version of the game was released on September 26, 2013, and was later opened up to all initial Kickstarter backers on November 19. The release date was postponed to early 2014.

Planetary Annihilation launched on September 5, 2014 on Windows, Mac and Linux.

Planetary Annihilation: Titans, a standalone expansion of the game was released on August 18, 2015. It adds 21 units to the game, including five titan class units. It also adds multi-level terrain, a bounty mode, and an improved tutorial.

Planetary Annihilation: Titans was gifted free to original Kickstarter backers from 2012 with a discount for other owners. Classic Planetary Annihilation was removed from sale in September 2018.

== Critical reception ==
Reception

Aggregate score
Aggregator	Score
Metacritic	62/100

Review scores
Publication	Score
Eurogamer	6/10
IGN	4.8/10

Planetary Annihilation received a mixed reception upon release. The game was praised for its ambitious concept, but criticized for playability and overall incompleteness. Rock, Paper, Shotgun's Brendan Caldwell writes: "Planetary Annihilation is a slick, modernised RTS, engineered from the ground up to appeal to the fast-paced, competitive, hotkey-loving esports crowd". PC Gamer's Emanuel Maiberg, experiencing hard to learn gameplay unaided by proper tutorials and disrupted by technical issues, states: "I know there's a great, massive RTS beneath all these issues. I've seen glimpses of it when everything works correctly, but at the moment I can't recommend Planetary Annihilation without a warning that it's bound to disappoint and frustrate, even if you do teach yourself to play it". IGN's Rob Zacny summarizes: "A cool idea about robot armies battling across an entire solar system breaks apart when the realities of controlling multiple worlds at the same time set in".
