= Uber Entertainment =

American video game developer

Star Theory Games
- Formerly: Uber Entertainment Inc. (2008–2019)
- Company type: Private
- Industry: Video games
- Founded: March 2008; 17 years ago
- Founders: Bob Berry; Jonathan Mavor
- Defunct: March 4, 2020
- Fate: Dissolved
- Headquarters: Bellevue, Washington, US
- Key people: Bob Berry (president); Jonathan Mavor (CTO)
- Products: Monday Night Combat; Super Monday Night Combat; Planetary Annihilation
- Number of employees: 30 (2019)
- Website: startheory.com

Star Theory Games (formerly Uber Entertainment Inc.) was an American video game developer based in Bellevue, Washington. Founded in March 2008 by Bob Berry and Jonathan Mavor, it released its first title, Monday Night Combat, in 2010 to positive reviews. The company assumed the name Star Theory Games in 2019. It wound down in March 2020 after the contract for its game Kerbal Space Program 2 was canceled by publisher Private Division, which set up a new studio and hired a large portion of Star Theory's staff in December 2019 to continue the game's development, before Star Theory and its remaining staff became unable to secure new publishing agreements as a result of the COVID-19 pandemic.

== History ==
Uber Entertainment was founded by Bob Berry and Jonathan Mavor in March 2008 in Bellevue, Washington. They became the studio's president and chief technology officer, respectively.

In September 2012, the company successfully ran a Kickstarter crowdfunding campaign for its real-time strategy title, Planetary Annihilation. The fundraiser produced over US$2.2 million in funds. The original retail release was slated for December 2013, but was postponed, with the game expected "to be feature-complete in early 2014."

On March 31, 2014, Uber Entertainment announced PlayFab as a spinout to continue development of their UberNet back-end gaming service. On January 29, 2018 PlayFab was acquired by Microsoft to form Microsoft Azure PlayFab.

On October 2, 2014, Uber Entertainment announced a new Kickstarter campaign for a real-time strategy game, Human Resources. The goal was set for $1.4 million, though the project was cancelled October 21, 2014 after projections showed the fundraiser would fail to raise the needed capital.

On August 18, 2015, Uber Entertainment released Planetary Annihilation: Titans as a stand-alone expansion to Planetary Annihilation.

On August 17, 2018, Planetary Annihilation Inc was founded to continue development and publishing of the Planetary Annihilation and Planetary Annihilation: Titans games.

At the 2019 Gamescom, Uber Entertainment announced it had changed its name to Star Theory Games, and was working with publisher Private Division, a subsidiary of Take-Two, to produce Kerbal Space Program 2. Creative director Nate Simpson said that the name change was due to their prior name being confused with Uber, the car-share company; Simpson noted that Uber had previously gotten permission from them to use the "Uber" name before, which they had granted. The original Kerbal Space Program had been produced by Squad, but Take-Two acquired the rights to the series in 2017, helping Squad to publish and meet their commitments to their players before handing over the intellectual property. Private Division opted to bring in Star Theory, a larger team but with similar capabilities, to work in parallel to develop the sequel while assisting Squad with the original game.

However, Take-Two announced it had created a new studio within Private Division in February 2020, later named Intercept Games, and had transferred development duties of Kerbal Space Program 2 there; along with this, members of Star Theory, including creative director Nate Simpson and studio head Jeremy Ables, had joined with this new studio, leaving Star Theory's role in the game unclear. According to Jason Schreier for Bloomberg News, around December 2019, shortly after they negotiated an extension to complete work on the game, Take-Two wanted to acquire Star Theory but Berry and Mavor did not like the terms of the deal, so Take-Two instead established Intercept Games and offered all Star Theory staff a position there, while Berry and Mavor encouraged the staff to stay with Star Theory. By February about twelve of the 30 staff had moved to Take-Two, and Kerbal contract was pulled from them by Take-Two. The remaining staff had planned to prepare prototypes and have material ready to present to publishers at the March 2020 Game Developers Conference, but because of the COVID-19 pandemic, the conference and others like it were closed down. Star Theory Games was shut down on March 4, 2020 as a result; some of the staff ended up at Take-Two to join the former staff.

== Games developed ==
Year	Title	Platform(s)	Notes
2010	Monday Night Combat	Microsoft Windows, Xbox 360	
2012	Super Monday Night Combat	Microsoft Windows	
2013	Outland Games	iOS	
2013	Toy Rush	iOS, Android	Collaboration with Tilting Point
2014	Planetary Annihilation	Linux, macOS, Microsoft Windows	
2015	Planetary Annihilation: Titans	Linux, macOS, Microsoft Windows	Stand-alone expansion of Planetary Annihilation
2016	Wayward Sky	PlayStation 4	For PlayStation VR
2017	Dino Frontier	PlayStation 4	For PlayStation VR
2023	Kerbal Space Program 2	Microsoft Windows, PlayStation 4, Xbox One	Development moved to Intercept Games in 2020
