= Dawngate =

- Developer(s): Waystone Games
- Publisher(s): Electronic Arts
- Platform(s): Microsoft Windows
- Release: Cancelled
- Genre(s): Multiplayer online battle arena
- Mode(s): Multiplayer

Dawngate was a multiplayer online battle arena video game developed by Waystone Games and published by Electronic Arts for Microsoft Windows. It was meant to be a free-to-play game likely to be supported by micro-transactions. News about the game began to leak during early-mid April 2013 with few details on mechanics, gameplay, or other elements. Testing period began on May 24, 2013, and the community beta was released on April 9, 2014. The open beta was released on May 19, 2014; on November 4, 2014, it was announced that because the beta was not shaping up as they had hoped, all development would stop and the game would be fully shut down in 90 days. In 2015, it became a registered trademark of EA. In June 2020 a development team of fans reached out to EA in a means to acquire the rights to the name to release their fan remake. A Kickstarter was set up as a means of gathering part of the funds required to obtain the rights and bring it back to life. Despite successfully raising the sought after funds, the project was abandoned when the cost to acquire the IP was determined to be prohibitively high.

== Gameplay ==
Dawngate is a team-oriented game where a group of five players (shapers) work together to complete objectives and destroy the enemy nexus. Destroying the nexus wins the game for the team.

Shapers and their stats can be modified by players by choosing spells and items. Shapers also have access to wards that can be placed to provide vision to areas of the map for their team.

=== Minions ===
AI controlled minions assist shapers in their objectives. They regularly spawn at the home location, marching down the lanes towards the enemy home. More powerful striders can also spawn.

=== Lanes ===
Dawngate maps contain two lanes. Each lane is controlled by three powerful bindings per side. Lines running the length of the lane inform players of the status of their bindings and enemy bindings.

=== Jungle ===
Surrounding the lanes is the jungle, a neutral area containing passive creatures. Just like minions and shapers, these creatures can be killed for vim. The jungle is also a way to cut across the map to other lanes - but players use this area to hunt each other as well.

Within the jungle are four Spirit Wells that passively gather vim for each team. Also within the center of the jungle is the Parasite, a powerful creature not to be trifled with alone.

=== Roles ===
When starting the game and formulating a team, players choose what roles they would like to provide. The role is not dependent upon shaper choice, though some shapers have an advantage in some areas. Role choice also provides role-specific benefits. Once players have chosen their shapers, final decisions can be made on what player will be assigned what role.

There are four roles: Gladiator, Tactician, Hunter, and Predator. Gladiators focus on killing lane minions. Tacticians focus on harassing enemy shapers. Hunters focus on killing creatures in the jungle. Predators focus on killing enemy shapers.

When choosing a role, players are also able to choose a loadout that grants additional passive bonuses.
