= Monday Night Combat =

2010 video game

- Developer: Uber Entertainment
- Publishers: Microsoft Game Studios (360); Uber Entertainment (Win)
- Composers: Cris Velasco; Robert Navarro; Howard Mostrom
- Engine: Unreal Engine 3
- Platforms: Xbox 360, Windows
- Release: Xbox 360; August 11, 2010; Windows; January 24, 2011
- Genres: Third-person shooter, MOBA
- Modes: Single-player, multiplayer

Monday Night Combat is a third-person shooter video game developed by Uber Entertainment. It was released on August 11, 2010 on the Xbox 360 as part of Microsoft's 2010 Xbox Live Summer of Arcade and is distributed through Xbox Live Arcade. It was released for Microsoft Windows by Uber Entertainment on January 24, 2011.

Monday Night Combat is a class-based third-person shooter game in which two teams are pitted against each other in a fictional combat setting similar to that of a tower defense title. The competitors on each team are clones, and the goal is to destroy the other team's Moneyball, a stationary objective which houses the team's money, while protecting their own. It is presented to the player as the Monday Night Football sport of the future.

The game was well received by critics according to video game aggregate websites. Reviewers were generally universal in praising the quality of the game in comparison to the cost. The game's graphics and art style were also praised. Critics noted that the six character classes were well-suited to the tower defense style of gameplay. As of year-end 2011, Monday Night Combat has sold over 307,000 copies on Xbox Live Arcade.

== Gameplay ==
Monday Night Combat is rendered in a cartoon art style.

Monday Night Combat is a shooter played from a third-person perspective. It combines a class-based character selection system with team-based objectives in the style of Defense of the Ancients. Its background is that of a futuristic replacement for Monday Night Football in which cloned soldiers battle against each other for money.

The game is played in one of two scenarios, each one a variant on the traditional action RTS setting with elements of tower defense mixed in. The first is Crossfire, in which teams of up to six compete online to destroy the other team's Moneyball, a stationary shielded object guarded by its respective team. The first team to destroy their opponent's Moneyball is declared the winner. The second gameplay scenario is known as Blitz. In Blitz up to four players work together to protect their team's Moneyball against increasingly difficult waves of robots. Blitz can be played alone, in two-player splitscreen or with up to four players online.

Players can choose between one of six classes, each with their own unique abilities and weapons. The Tank and Gunner classes focus on heavy weaponry. The Support class is similar to Team Fortress 2's engineer and medic, providing support for their team by healing teammates, and repairing robots and turrets. The Assault class plays similarly to the standard soldier class found in other games, and is patterned as a well-rounded class for players. Snipers can be used as long-range support, but can also use their secondary weaponry when in close proximity to enemies. Finally Assassins are focused on stealth and mobility and can use their abilities to sneak up on enemies, dispatch them, and then quickly escape.

As players destroy robots and make kills they are rewarded with cash, which can then in turn be used to buy upgrades, improve the defense of their base, or send specialty robots against the other team. Players can also earn cash by attacking the sport's mascot, Bullseye, which occasionally appears on the field. Another thing that players accumulate as they play is Juice. Filling the Juice gauge allows the player a brief period of super-powered abilities they can use to attack the other team. Additionally, bacon is infrequently dropped by the mascot or robots when attacked. Bacon serves as a powerup for the player, giving them boosted abilities until they die or the round ends. Churros were added to the first downloadable content pack, and give the player a temporary health boost, and regenerate the player's abilities.

== Development and marketing ==
Monday Night Combat was announced for the Xbox 360 via Xbox Live Arcade on January 15, 2010. It was shown in April 2010 at PAX East in Boston, Massachusetts with a playable demo. It was also shown in June 2010 at the Electronic Entertainment Expo with another playable demo. The Xbox 360 version was released on August 11, 2010 via Xbox Live Arcade. The possibility of the game coming to other platforms as hinted at during an interview with Executive Producer Chandana Ekanayake. The PC version of the game was announced December 14, 2010. Uber Entertainment conducted a public beta testing session which started December 16, 2010 for consumers who pre-ordered the game. It was officially released on January 24, 2011 via the digital distributor Steam and will contain the core game and the Spunky Cola Special content. Ekanayake further revealed in an interview with PC Gamer that the PC version of the game will have full support for the Unreal development tools, allowing players to create fan-based modifications and levels.

Developers created levels with simple shapes (top) to lock down gameplay. Concept art for the final arenas was then created as a reference (bottom).

Giant Bomb chose Monday Night Combat to play on Justin.tv during its weekly Thursday Night Throwdown. After news of this reached the official Uber Entertainment Twitter account, Uber Entertainment creative director John Comes, Director of QA & Associate Producer Logan DeMelt, and CEO Bob Berry joined the stream. They offered advice to the four players competing in a match of Blitz, gave developer insight to making the game and distributed a few free copies of Monday Night Combat.

The game was created by a team of sixteen developers, but began with six developers in a two bedroom apartment. For the first year of development the game was known under the code name of Hostile. During a presentation at Williams College, developers Uber Entertainment revealed much of the game's development process. It began with whitebox testing in Epic Games' Unreal Engine 3 to lay out basic gameplay, game flow, the game's over-the-shoulder camera, and more. Placeholder models and effects were then added to adjust the shader system and to discover what assets can be shared amongst characters and classes. Arenas were then built with basic shapes to lock down scale and overall level flow. This would then serve as a base for the final level design.

In order to simplify and streamline development time, three base character skeletons were shared amongst the six character classes. Characters were modeled then multiple texture maps were applied. Specular and normal maps were added to the model prior to the main texture map. The texture map was then added with any team-colorized sections painted in greyscale tones. A team color mask is then applied to give the character a team-aligned texture. Robot characters also have multiple texture maps to signify damage received. The music for the game was composed by Cris Velasco of Monarch Audio.

Monday Night Combat features an on the fly update system. Instead of the game being patched to correct issues, most game-wide variables are controlled on the server level, allowing Uber Entertainment to make tweaks to things such as character speed, weapon damage, match length and game difficulty. This allows for fine tuning without the need to download an additional patch for the game. Monday Night Combat's dynamic update system is hosted on Microsoft's Title Managed Storage. Title Managed Storage is an allocated space on Xbox Live servers for developers to use. Uber Entertainment placed a text document on the server which stores any values they want to be able to adjust dynamically. When a change needs to be made, the value is changed in the text file, and instantly the gameplay is tweaked.

On August 29, 2010 Uber Entertainment revealed via their official blog that a title update for the game was being tested. This update would fix gameplay bugs related to character classes, multiplayer, and general gameplay. They also revealed at that time plans for three downloadable content packages and further stated that the first of the three packages would be free to consumers. The blog post also revealed the figurine statues available for purchase as part of the game's promotions. On October 13, 2010 a title update was released, which fixed multiple issues and made various gameplay tweaks.

The first downloadable content package, entitled Spunky Cola Special, was officially announced over a week-long promotion in October 2010 known as the Monday Night Combat Halloween Unmasking. The free content consists of two new arenas, one devoted to Crossfire mode and the other to Blitz. Also included are several bug fixes and additional features. Spunky Cola Special was released December 1, 2010. In an interview, Monday Night Combat's art director and executive producer Chandana Ekanayake revealed that Uber found top ranking players playing Blitz for 6–8 hours without failing, something the game was not intended to do. According to Ekanayake, to accommodate those players the downloadable content also included "a tougher Super Sudden Death challenge as well as updated the round clocks to include four digits up to round 9999." Ekanayake further stated that Uber would be focusing on additional content and updates for Monday Night Combat players.

== Reception ==
Reception

Aggregate score
Aggregator	Score
Metacritic	X360: 79/100; PC: 82/100

Review scores
Publication	Score
Eurogamer	9/10
Game Informer	7.75/10
GamePro	4/5
GameRevolution	A−
IGN	8/10
PALGN	8/10

Monday Night Combat was well received by critics, averaging 79 out of 100 at Metacritic, a video game aggregate website. As of October 2010, Monday Night Combat has sold over 225,000 copies on Xbox Live Arcade. That number rose to over 293,000 at the close of 2010. As of year-end 2011 sales increased to over 307,000 units. Most reviewers agreed that the game was well worth the price of 1200 Microsoft Points. GamePro called the game "equal parts wacky, polished, and just downright fun." Game Revolution agreed, calling Monday Night Combat "so much unadulterated fun." Official Xbox Magazine called it a "great third-person shooter with Monday-night-football flair." It received Gamasutra's award for Best Downloadable Console Game for 2010.

Game Revolution stated the gameplay was an improvement over Team Fortress 2. GamePro also stated the Team Fortress 2 veterans "should definitely enjoy the very obvious similarities." Official Xbox Magazine felt that the game's six character classes were well balanced and that each class provided utility to players. PALGN praised the cartoon art style and over the top commentary by the game's announcer. They went on to call the Monday Night Combat a "stylish, streamlined, expertly crafted third person shooter." IGN noted the game's fun multiplayer modes, stating that both cooperative and versus modes are "good fun if you get a crew together."

Official Xbox Magazine criticized the fact that the game only comes equipped with two modes and four arenas. GamePro agreed, stating with a low number of robot types and very few maps that "the action will eventually lose some luster over time." IGN reviewer Daemon Hatfield expressed surprise and confusion in regards to attacking Bullseye, the Monday Night Mascot, for cash, calling it "one of the most bizarre gaming events I've recently witnessed." Game Informer expressed similar thoughts, saying "this guy is so annoying that it's impossible not to smile while shooting him." Destructoid was critical of the character classes, calling them unbalanced. GameSpot was critical of the game's announcer, stating that they found the commentary annoying. They also went on to criticize the limited tutorial, stating it leaves the player "to read up [in the] How to Play section of the pause menu."

The Spunky Cola Special downloadable content was generally well received. Griffin McElroy of Joystiq praised the fact that the content was released free of charge. Destructoid's Jordan Devore agreed, and stated it was a "smart move for a game that shouldn't segregate its audience." The reviewer from XBLAfans praised the amount of content given in Spunky Cola Special. The reviewer called the new arenas "relentless" and "fast paced". Also praised were the addition of churros as a powerup, the additional voice lines for the game's announcer, and the 47 additional protags; markings to indicate a player's clan or affiliation.

== Sequel ==
A sequel, Super Monday Night Combat, was developed by Uber and was released on April 18, 2012. It draws even more heavily from the DotA lineage of multiplayer online battle arena games, adopting elements such as a free to play model, character skins, and regularly released new Pros along with a rotating group of free Pros and new outdoor environments.
