= Paragon (video game) =

- Cover art of Paragon's Essentials Edition
- Developer: Epic Games
- Publisher: Epic Games
- Director: Steve Superville
- Producer: John Wasilczyk
- Engine: Unreal Engine 4
- Platforms: Microsoft Windows; PlayStation 4
- Release: Cancelled
- Genre: Multiplayer online battle arena
- Mode: Multiplayer

Paragon was a free-to-play multiplayer online battle arena (MOBA) game developed and published by Epic Games, powered by their own Unreal Engine 4. The game started buy-to-play early access in March 2016, and then launched free-to-play access to its open beta started in August 2016.

After failed attempts to make the game sustainable and having trouble keeping a player base, Epic Games made the decision to shut down Paragon servers in April 2018.

== Gameplay ==
Paragon was a third-person multiplayer online battle arena (MOBA) video game. The maps featured in the game were symmetrical, and bases were located at the two opposite ends of a map. Players were tasked with defeating the enemy team by destroying the core in their base. They had the ability to reach their opponents' bases through the three lanes featured in each map. Each lane was protected by defensive towers that protected the bases by attacking any incoming enemies that stood within its range automatically. Lanes consisted of two towers and an inhibitor; destroying all of these allowed a team to spawn more powerful minions in that lane and directly attack the enemy core. Between lanes were jungles, inside which players could find additional resources for their teams. Jungles were separated from lanes by fog walls that players could not see other players through.

In a match, ten players were divided into two teams. Each player assumed control of a "Hero." Each hero had their own basic attack and possessed a set of four abilities composed of active attacks or maneuvers or passive buffs that helped them or their teammates. Different heroes had different skills and weapons. For instance, TwinBlast, an offensive hero, primarily fires two pistols and throws grenades, while Muriel, a defensive hero, aids her allies with a shield. Heroes came in ranged and melee classes. Each hero had an ultimate ability; for example, ranged hero Murdock can fire a massive laser with infinite range. Both teams had minions, which jog toward their opponents' bases and support the heroes. Super Minions entered the lanes upon destroying the enemy inhibitors.

When players killed an enemy hero or minion or destroy an enemy tower, they gained experience and gold. Experience allowed players to level up and unlock or upgrade abilities. Just before a match started, players could choose a deck of cards that allows players to use gold to purchase upgrades such as health boosts and strength-enhancing artifacts for their heroes. Players could use a default deck or build their own when not playing a match. Cards and decks were divided into five different affinities. Each deck had two affinities, and had to contain cards with either of those affinities. Chests (loot boxes), which contained cards, could be earned through rewards from completing matches. Players could also use real-world currency to boost their reputation points and experience points. According to Epic, the game was not pay-to-win. As a result, players may only purchase cosmetic items with real-world currency or coins found within loot chests. The game also featured a replay system, which allowed players to spectate matches. The game regularly added new heroes and edited the main battle map through updates.

== Development ==
Paragon was in development at Epic Games. According to executive producer John Wasilczyk, the team was given the chance to "make anything" and had a lot of creative freedom when they started the project. One of the main goals for developing the game was to introduce action elements into the genre. To achieve this, the game features gameplay similar to a third-person shooter, and the in-game characters were designed to possess mobility skills. For example, characters like Khaimera have the ability to leap and strike while Kallari possesses the ability to do a double backflip. The team also focused on verticality while developing the game's maps, which allowed them to turn the moments shown in MOBA CGI's trailers into an actual gameplay experience. According to Steve Superville, the game's creative director, the maps were designed to "[shape] like a bowl" so that players can look across the map easily when they respawn, observe the battle situation and plan their attacks strategically. The card system was designed to make the game more accessible for new players, simplify the traditional item system, and create more strategic choices. According to Epic, it is a feature that can help the game to differentiate itself from its competitors. Epic also transferred some of the resources for making Fortnite to Paragon's development. Wasilczyk also stated that potentials for an esport series were being considered, depending on the demand of the community and the game's popularity.

Paragon was set to be a non-boxed game released by Epic. According to Superville, the team were excited about the change as this format allows them to receive responses from the community and make adjustments immediately. The game was announced on November 3, 2015, and the first gameplay trailer debuted at PlayStation Experience 2015. The game entered early access on March 18, 2016, for PlayStation 4 and Microsoft Windows, with cross-platform play having been tested a month earlier. While the product was free-to-play, payment was required for early access to the game before the open beta release on August 16, 2016. The early access version of the game had three versions: Founder's Pack, Challenger Packs, and Master Packs, all of which featured cosmetic items, additional boosts, and upgrades. At the start of the early access version, the game contained thirteen characters. Epic promised that new characters would be added to the game for free one by one every three weeks and that they did not fix the roster size. A retail PS4 version titled Essentials Edition, which adds multiple in-game items, was also set to be released alongside the game's digital free-to-play version, and released on June 7, 2016.

Upon release of Epic's Fortnite's "Battle Royale" mode in late 2017, Epic decided to reduce the development team supporting the game in favor of Fortnite, as Paragon's limited growth did not meet expectations. Ultimately, in January 2018, Epic announced they would be closing down Paragon by April of that year, providing full refunds to all players.

Following the cancellation of Paragon on March 19, 2018, developer Epic Games, and the owner of Unreal Engine, announced that it would release all $17,000,000 worth of game assets for free use by anyone working with the Unreal Engine 4, via the Unreal Engine Marketplace. The first wave of released content included 20 characters, with their respective skins, animations, VFX and dialogue, along with over 1,500 environment components.

== Legacy ==
Despite the game itself never seeing the light of release, Epic Games' decision to convert the game assets for Paragon into free-to-use assets had inspired a handful of similar games in the coming years.

Fault: Elder Orb was the first of these revival projects to enter early access, developed by Canada based Strange Matter Studios. It was live and fully playable on Steam since July 17, 2020 and on the Epic Games Store alongside their free-to-play launch on July 18, 2022. However, servers for the game were shut down on November 1, 2022.

On March 9, 2021, Omeda Studios announced they had raised $2.2 million to create a cross-platform third-person multiplayer online battle arena (MOBA) game called Predecessor, using the assets from Paragon.

Netmarble SoulEVE announced a PC third-person multiplayer online battle arena (MOBA) game called Overprime, which also utilizes the assets from Paragon. On October 14, 2022, Epic Games granted Netmarble Corp. the rights to use all Paragon assets to craft Overprime. These rights included the Paragon trademark, and game title. As a result, Netmarble decided to change the game title to Paragon: The Overprime. On December 5, 2022, the game launched in early access via Steam and Epic Games Store. Netmarble announced on February 22, 2024 that Paragon: The Overprime would shut down on April 22. Starting immediately, in-game content would also no longer cost real money.
