= Avalon Heroes =

- Developer: WeMade Entertainment
- Publisher: alaplaya
- Platform: Microsoft Windows
- Release: KR: 2009 (open beta); EU: February 10, 2010
- Genre: MOBA
- Mode: Multiplayer

Avalon Heroes, known as Avalon Online in Asia, was a free-to-play multiplayer online battle arena video game developed by WeMade Entertainment for Microsoft Windows. The game is heavily based on Warcraft III: The Frozen Thrones popular mod CHAOS which is also heavily based on Defense of the Ancients. Avalon Heroes did get some attention in eSports circles. The game was closed on 8 February 2013 due to not having enough active players.

== Development and release ==
Avalon Heroes was developed by Movon, the creator of Spike Girls. It was published by WeMade Entertainment.

An open beta started on 20 March 2009. The service closed down on 28 December 2015.
