= Kerbal Space Program =

2015 space flight simulation video game

- Developer: Squad
- Publishers: Squad (2011–2018); Private Division (2018–2023)
- Producer: Néstor Gómez
- Designers: Felipe Falanghe, Paul Boyle
- Programmers: Jamie Leighton, David Tregoning
- Artist: Rafael González
- Composer: Edu Castillo
- Engine: Unity
- Platforms: Linux; macOS; Windows; PlayStation 4; Xbox One; PlayStation 5; Xbox Series X/S
- Release: Linux, macOS, Windows; WW: 27 April 2015; PlayStation 4; NA: 12 July 2016; Xbox One; WW: 15 July 2016 Enhanced Edition; PS4, Xbox One; WW: 16 January 2018; PS5, Xbox Series X/S; WW: 24 September 2021
- Genre: Space flight simulation
- Mode: Single-player

Kerbal Space Program is a 2015 space flight simulation video game developed by Mexican studio Squad for Linux, macOS, Windows, PlayStation 4, PlayStation 5, Xbox Series X/S and Xbox One. In the game, players direct the space program of a species of green humanoid aliens known as Kerbals. The game features a pseudo-realistic orbital physics engine, allowing for various real-life orbital maneuvers such as Hohmann transfer orbits and orbital rendezvous.

The first public version was released digitally on Squad's Kerbal Space Program storefront on 24 June 2011, and joined Steam's early access program on 20 March 2013. The game was released out of beta on 27 April 2015. Kerbal Space Program has support for user-created mods that add new features, such as interstellar travel, improved physics, new parts, and multiplayer. Popular mods have received support and inclusion in the game by Squad. The game has garnered commendation from spaceflight industry figures such as NASA, ESA, science communicator Scott Manley, former ULA CEO Tory Bruno, SpaceX CEO Elon Musk, and Rocket Lab CEO Peter Beck.

In May 2017, Squad announced that the game had been purchased by video game company Take-Two Interactive, who would help support Squad in keeping the console versions up-to-date alongside the personal computer versions. An Enhanced Edition was released for Xbox One and PlayStation 4 in January 2018, and for PlayStation 5 and Xbox Series X/S in September 2021 by Private Division, a publishing subsidiary of Take-Two Interactive. Two expansions for the game have been released as downloadable content: Making History in March 2018 and Breaking Ground in May 2019. A sequel, Kerbal Space Program 2, was released in early access on 24 February 2023, although the developer has since shut down and no substantive updates have been released since June 2024.

== Gameplay ==
A rocket (stock ship "Kerbal X") sitting on the launchpad with the Mun, Kerbin's nearest moon, in the background

Characters Valentina and Jebediah Kerman standing on the launchpad

The player operates a space program operated by Kerbals, a species of small green humanoids, who have constructed a spaceport on their home planet, Kerbin. From the space center players can build various vehicles such as rockets, aircraft, spaceplanes, and rovers from a provided set of components. Constructed craft can be launched from the space center's launch pad or runway to accomplish various tasks while avoiding partial or catastrophic failure (such as lack of fuel or structural failure). Players control flight with little assistance other than a Stability Assist System (SAS) to keep their vehicle oriented. Provided it maintains sufficient thrust and fuel, a spacecraft can enter orbit around Kerbin, or travel to other celestial bodies. To visualize vehicle trajectories, the player is provided with a 'map' that displays the vehicle's trajectory as well as that of celestial bodies and other spacecraft, as well as their orbital parameters. Spacecraft maneuver 'nodes' can be plotted, timed, and executed, and objects can be selected and 'targeted' to facilitate flybys, rendezvous, and docking.

Missions (either player-set or assigned "contracts") involve goals such as reaching a certain altitude, escaping the atmosphere, reaching a stable orbit, landing on a certain planetary body, rescuing stranded astronauts, capturing asteroids, and creating space stations and surface bases. Players may also set challenges for each other on the game's forums, such as landing on all five moons of the gas giant Jool. In addition, the game has many user-created mods, dealing with gameplay and visuals.

Players can control in-game Kerbal astronauts known as kerbonauts, who can exit spacecraft on extravehicular activities (EVAs). While on EVA, Kerbals may use their EVA suit to maneuver in space, similar to the use of NASA's Manned Maneuvering Unit. Kerbals on EVA can collect and cache science experiments, plant flags on the surfaces of planets and moons, and repair spacecraft.

Historical space missions can be implemented and flown in the game, such as an Apollo Moon landing, the Curiosity rover, the International Space Station, and, more recently, the Artemis II manned moon mission. Certain parts in the game are based on real-life hardware, such as the Probodobodyne Stayputnik (an analogue of Sputnik 1), the Mk1-3 Command Pod (Apollo command module), and the KS-25 'Vector' (RS-25 engine). Various community-developed mods can add features such as additional parts, informational displays detailing orbital characteristics, and autopilot functionalities. Some mods have been incorporated into the core game, due to popularity. For example, resource mining, or extracting ore for refinement into rocket fuel, has been implemented into the main game from a popular mod.

=== Solar System ===
The game's planetary system, called the Kerbol system, is loosely based on the real-world Solar System, consisting of the planets Moho, Eve, Kerbin, Duna, Dres, Jool, and Eeloo, which are respectively analogues of Mercury, Venus, Earth, Mars, Ceres, Jupiter, and Pluto. Eve is orbited by Gilly, a small captured asteroid; Kerbin is orbited by two moons, the larger Mun and the smaller, more distant Minmus; and Duna is orbited by Ike, a large rocky moon, both of which are tidally locked to each other. Jool possesses 5 moons: Laythe, an ocean world with a breathable atmosphere; Vall, an icy moon; Tylo, a rocky moon the size of Kerbin; and Bop and Pol, two small irregular moons. Various community mods implement extended or alternative planetary systems, including an exact-size real-world Solar System and multiple extra systems. Because the game does not utilize n-body simulation, the planets and moons do not exert any gravitational effect on each other. Porting the system into a game with n-body simulation, such as Universe Sandbox, will result in multiple collisions between bodies and a generally unstable system.

=== Game modes ===
Three game modes are available: sandbox, science, and career. Sandbox mode imposes no limitations, with unlimited parts available for any player-directed project. Many players have used Sandbox mode to implement replicas of historical real-life vehicles, as well as create impractically large or complex spacecraft.

Science mode presents a limited selection of parts at the beginning of the game. Players must travel to and perform experiments at various sites around Kerbin, outer space, and on other celestial bodies to gain 'science', which can be used to unlock additional parts. This mode was designed to ease new players into the game and prevent them from getting overwhelmed. Aside from the unlocking of parts, this mode is functionally identical to sandbox mode.

Career mode expands upon science mode's progression by adding funds, reputation, and contracts. Parts and fuel must be purchased with funds. Completing contracts on time will pay out funds and increase reputation, while unsatisfactory outcomes (such as missing deadlines or killing astronauts) result in penalties to funding and reputation. Greater reputation results in more difficult and prestigious contracts. Players must spend funds to purchase parts and upgrade buildings to unlock new features such as larger rocket build size and improved tracking.

=== Physics ===
While the game's physics engine is not a perfect simulation of reality, it has been praised for its largely accurate orbital mechanics; all objects in the game except the celestial bodies are simulated using Newtonian dynamics. Rocket thrust (and torque) is applied to a vehicle's frame based on the placement of engines, and joints between parts have limited strength – too much force will break a vehicle apart. The stock, unmodded game simulates orbits using patched conic approximation instead of a full n-body simulation; thus, it does not support Lagrange points, perturbations, Lissajous orbits, halo orbits or tidal forces.

The in-game astronauts, Kerbals, are physically simulated. Forceful collisions with objects or terrain will cause Kerbals to tumble until they can regain their balance, and sufficiently forceful impacts will result in the Kerbals' death.

Some celestial bodies have atmospheres of varying heights and densities, affecting the impact of drag on wings and parachutes. The simulations are accurate enough that real-world techniques such as aerobraking are viable methods of navigating the solar system. Flight through an atmosphere at excessive speeds results in aerodynamic heating; high enough temperatures will cause components to fail or explode, necessitating the use of heat shields or more careful flight profiles. In-game atmospheres thin out into space but have finite heights, unlike real atmospheres.

Kerbal Space Program alters the scale of its solar system for gameplay purposes. For example, Kerbin (the game's analog of Earth) has a radius of only 600 kilometres (370 mi), approximately 1/10 that of Earth's. To compensate for the gravitational consequences of this size difference, the densities of the planets are unrealistically high, with Kerbin's density being over 10 times that of Earth's.

=== Expansions ===
There are two downloadable content (DLC) expansions: Making History and Breaking Ground.

==== Making History ====
The Making History expansion, released in March 2018, adds additional elements to the game, some of which are historic parts from the Space Race. These parts include the Apollo Lunar Module, Soviet R7 fuel tanks, and more. A level editor allows the players to create their own scenarios in which they must complete various tasks to succeed each level. New Space Race-inspired suits and pre-built missions were also added.

==== Breaking Ground ====
Breaking Ground, released in May 2019, adds robotic parts, which can be used to build helicopters, propeller airplanes, suspension systems, custom landing gear, and robots. The parts include pistons, hinges, grip pads, and rotors. A new retro-futuristic spacesuit was added as well. A major addition are surface features and new science experiments. The player can find certain rocks on surfaces of planets and analyze them using robotic arms. Science experiments such as active seismometers and weather stations can be deployed by the Kerbals and can be used to gather extra science points in science and career mode.

== Development ==
=== Pre-development ===
Director Felipe Falanghe was hired by Squad in April 2010. At the time, the company did not develop software. According to Falanghe, the name "Kerbal" came from the names he gave small tin figurines he installed in modified fireworks as a teenager. In October 2010, development on Kerbal Space Program was authorized by co-founder Adrian Goya but deferred until Falanghe had completed his projects. Kerbal Space Program was first compiled on 17 January 2011. The game's first public release, version 0.7.3, was on 24 June 2011. The game entered beta on 15 December 2014, with version 0.90, and was released out of beta on 27 April 2015.

=== Alpha ===
Version 0.7.3 was the first public release of Kerbal Space Program, and was released on 24 June 2011. It was downloaded over 5,000 times. Compared to future versions of this game, 0.7.3 was quite rudimentary. There was no stability assist mode, Kerbin did not rotate and the Sun was simply a directional light source. There were no fuel flow mechanics, no control surfaces, and no other celestial bodies. Later versions added additional planets and moons, as well as the ability to load and save collections of parts, known as "subassemblies". Tutorials were also added at this stage.

On 20 March 2013, Steam's early access program was started, with Kerbal Space Program being one of twelve games already accessible from its beginning.

Version 0.24, titled First Contract and released on 17 July 2014, added the contracts and reputation system to the game's career mode; however, players were still able to play career mode without these features in the new science mode. The final alpha release, 0.25, extended career mode and reworked aircraft components.

=== Beta ===
Version 0.90, nicknamed Beta Than Ever, was released on 15 December 2014. This was the only beta update for Kerbal Space Program. Featuring an overhaul of the rocket creation editor, it introduced the ability to sort parts by several characteristics and to assign parts to custom categories. The offset tool was added, allowing players to offset parts from the location where they were first placed. Parts could even be offset into other parts. The ability to manipulate parts in such a manner is a somewhat controversial feature known as "part clipping". Career mode featured building upgrades; only the creation of small rockets with low mass and part count is initially supported, but the player can upgrade each of the facilities to increase size limitations or unlock other capabilities.

=== Release ===
Version 1.0, the first full release of Kerbal Space Program (nicknamed We Have Liftoff!), was released on 27 April 2015. Version 1.0 completely overhauled the flight and drag model for a more realistic simulation, now ignoring drag on rocket parts which were occluded from the air flow. It also allowed for body lift, so that parts that were not specifically designed as wings (such as structural panels) could still generate lift. 1.0 added shock heating and heat shields, making atmospheric entry much more dangerous, as well as air brakes and procedurally generated fairings. All parts received internal modeling. Resource mining was added to refine into fuel or monopropellant. 1.0 also brought several improvements to Kerbals, who could now have various specializations. For example, "Engineer" Kerbals can repair wheels and landing legs. Female Kerbals were also added to the game. Version 1.1, nicknamed Turbo Charged, was released on 19 April 2016, almost one year after the last major update. The game engine was upgraded from Unity 4 to Unity 5, resulting in an increase in performance, as well as a stable 64-bit client, removing memory constraints caused by too many mods being installed. Much of the game was rewritten to accomplish this.

Squad released Version 1.2, nicknamed Loud And Clear, to upgrade the game from Unity 5 to 5.4 and introduce performance and minor gameplay improvements. The patch entered experimental testing on 6 September 2016 and was officially released on 11 October 2016. Its main new features include communication satellites, relay systems, and KerbNet. Several updates have been released since.

On 10 June 2021, Squad announced that update 1.12 On Final Approach, would be the last major planned release and that the Squad developers would join the Intercept Games team working on KSP 2.

=== Other updates, Take-Two Interactive ownership ===
On 27 January 2014, it was revealed that Squad was working on an education-themed version of the game entitled KerbalEdu in collaboration with TeacherGaming LLC, creators of MinecraftEdu. It has since been released and includes an improved user interface for easier data gathering and summary, pre-made lessons that focus on certain constructions, options to use the metric system, and a "robust pedagogy" that includes information outside of the game that ties into its content.

Squad has also made an Asteroid Mission Pack, with full support from NASA. Released on 1 April 2014, it is based on the real-life initiative to send humans out to study asteroids.

The majority of the game's music was provided by royalty-free composer Kevin MacLeod, with the rest of the soundtrack having been written by Squad's in-house composer Victor Machado. The game's main theme was composed by lead designer Felipe Falanghe and arranged by Machado.

On 5 June 2015, it was announced that Kerbal Space Program was being ported to the PlayStation 4 by Flying Tiger Entertainment. In August 2015, it was announced that Xbox One and Wii U ports were also in development by Flying Tiger Entertainment.

The game has since been released on the PlayStation 4 and Xbox One, but Squad has been quiet regarding the announced Wii U port. In January 2017, one of Squad's developers finally broke the silence on the official forums, and admitted that despite initial enthusiasm to release the game on the Wii U, they claimed that various "external factors" has forced them to reevaluate supporting the console. They added that additional details will be announced at a later date.

On 17 March 2017, Squad announced a full expansion for the game; called Making History, it would be paid and contain new features. These new features included Mission Builder, which would allow players to create and edit their missions that players could complete by launching and operating various rockets and ships in the game, and History Pack, which would provide designed missions simulating important historical space endeavors that have been completed in real life. Squad announced on 7 February 2018 that the expansion would be released on 13 March 2018. The expansion contains many parts inspired by those used in various rockets such as the Soyuz spacecraft and the Saturn V.

Squad announced in May 2017 that Kerbal Space Program has been acquired by publisher Take-Two Interactive; this acquisition does not affect Squad's development or plans for the game and early backers will still get free DLC, and with Take-Two's help as a publisher, better support Kerbal Space Program on consoles to keep those versions to-date alongside the PC version. Kerbal Space Program was one of the first titles published under Take-Two Interactives's 2017-launched Private Division, a publishing label aimed to support mid-sized development studios.

In late May 2019, Squad released the Breaking Ground expansion, which includes servos, pistons, new and redesigned space suits, and experiments which can be deployed to earn science over time.

On 24 June 2021, the last major version of Kerbal Space Program, version 1.12, was released. It was named "On Final Approach".

== Reception ==
Reception

Aggregate score
| Aggregator | Score |
|---|---|
| Metacritic | 88/100 |

Review scores
| Publication | Score |
|---|---|
| Destructoid | 8.5/10 |
| Edge | 9/10 |
| Game Informer | 8.5/10 |
| GameSpot | 9/10 |
| IGN | 9/10 |
| PC Gamer (US) | 96/100 |

Awards
| Publication | Award |
|---|---|
| Game Developers Choice Awards | Audience Award |
| Unity Awards | Best Gameplay |
| Unity Awards | Community Choice |
| Golden Joystick Awards | Best Indie Game |
| National Academy of Video Game Trade Reviewers | Game, Simulation |
| Edge | PC Game of the Year |

The public alpha and beta releases were well received. Many publications have spoken positively of the game, praising its replay value and creative aspects, including Kotaku, Rock, Paper, Shotgun, IGN, GameSpy, Eurogamer, Polygon, and Destructoid.

In May 2015, PC Gamer awarded Kerbal Space Program 1.0 a score of 96 out of 100, their highest review score of 2015. They praised the "perfect blend of science and slapstick", as well as the sense of accomplishment felt upon reaching other planets and completing goals. IGN's Seth G. Macy has praised Kerbal Space Program's ability to create fun out of failure, saying that "By the time I finally built a rocket that achieved successful orbit, I had failed so many times that in almost any other game I would have given up completely."

In their review, Edge thought that "The magic of Kerbal Space Program is not just that it manages to be both a game and a simulation, a high-level educational tool and something that is fun to simply sit and tinker with. It's that, in combination, these qualities allow for a connection with real history and real human achievement... Its ultimate promise to the player is not that you'll crack a puzzle that has been set by a designer, but that you'll crack a puzzle set by reality."

During the 19th Annual D.I.C.E. Awards, the Academy of Interactive Arts & Sciences nominated Kerbal Space Program for "Strategy/Simulation Game of the Year" and the "D.I.C.E. Sprite Award".

=== Commercial ===
In the hours after its Steam early access release on 20 March 2013, Kerbal Space Program was one of the platform's top 5 best-selling games, as well as the best seller on Steam for Linux.

Squad has released physical merchandise such as clothing and plush toys. In March 2015, Squad and 3D printing service Eucl3D announced a partnership that would allow players to order custom models of their craft.

Following the launch of the Artemis II mission in April 2026 the game surpassed its all time concurrent player count peak, possibly due to enthusiasm created by a manned lunar mission for space exploration.

=== Scientific community ===
The game has crossed over into the scientific community with scientists and members of the space industry displaying an interest in the game, including NASA, ESA, ULA's Tory Bruno, Rocket Lab's Peter Beck, and SpaceX's Elon Musk. Squad has added a NASA-based Asteroid Redirect Mission pack to the game, allowing players in-game to track and capture asteroids for mining and study. Squad has also developed an official mod for the game centered around observing and tracking threatening asteroids, named "Asteroid Day". The mod was developed in partnership with the B612 Foundation. Some parts from this mod outside of core functionality were added as part of the release of the 1.1 update, with full integration of the mod to stock game being the version 1.3. In collaboration with ESA, Squad added components for the BepiColombo and Rosetta spacecraft, along with several ESA-themed textures for in-game parts in version 1.10.

External image
- Photograph of a plush Kerbal on the ISS. Taken by cosmonaut Sergey Korsakov and posted on Twitter.

For the second orbital test flight of the Boeing Starliner which docked with the International Space Station on 21 May 2022, the crew placed a plushie of a Kerbal in the vessel to be used as the zero gravity indicator. A Boeing spokesperson said that "Jeb" was chosen "to represent the enthusiasm many on the Starliner engineering team have for the game, as well as the science, technology, engineering and mathematics (STEM) lessons it imparts to players."

== Other releases ==
=== Sequel ===
A sequel, Kerbal Space Program 2, released in early access on 24 February 2023.

Kerbal Space Program 2 planned to build on the sandbox features of its predecessor, Kerbal Space Program, by adding elements such as new propulsion methods (e.g. the Orion drive), habitation modules for building on-surface, orbital and planetary colonies, a multiplayer mode, as well as interstellar travel throughout the course of its early access. Many of the promised features were incomplete or not present, angering many fans.

Moreover, Intercept Games, the developer of the game, was shut down after its game development team had been laid off in June 2024. The game has not been updated since then.

Owing to this and given the game's poor performance and lack of information on its future, its Steam page was review bombed causing the average rating to fall to "Overwhelmingly Negative."

=== Kerbalizer ===
Kerbalizer was a freemium app developed by Squad, released online in late 2012, before being ported to iOS and Android simultaneously on April 4, 2013. Nothing much is known about Kerbalizer. The software allowed players to design and dress up Kerbals, then share them via email or Facebook. The game stopped receiving updates in late 2013. Due to compatibility issues the game was silently delisted from the platforms in 2015.

== See also ==
- List of space flight simulation games
- Planetarium software
- List of observatory software
- Apollo 11 in popular culture
