= Realm of the Titans =

2010 video game

- Developer(s): Ningbo Shengguang Tianyi
- Publisher(s): NA: Aeria Games
- Engine: BigWorld
- Platform(s): Microsoft Windows
- Release: PRC: October 2010; NA: 2011
- Genre(s): Multiplayer online battle arena

Realm of the Titans (Chinese: 天翼決; pinyin: tiān yì jué) is a multiplayer online battle arena video game developed by Ningbo Shengguang Tianyi for Microsoft Windows. The game is partially inspired by the Warcraft III custom map, Defense of the Ancients.

== Development ==
A team of developers was assembled, primarily staff previously experienced in outsourcing but not in a start-to-finish development of a project. Development was wholly done in Shanghai, with player support, server operation and company administration based at the parent company in Yinzhou DistrictNingbo.

The main server was opened to the public on 30 October 2010, just over two years after the project started.

Alpha testing began in North America on the April 7, 2011.

Realm of the Titans uses the BigWorld engine, which was originally designed for Massively Multiplayer Online Role Playing Games presenting some issues of adapting both the client and the server to handle the very different requirements.

Development was started in 2008 soon after CEO Qian Wenhai and Lead Designer Zhou Weifeng returned to China after studying in Melbourne, Australia. At University, both had become quite prominent in the Australian DOTA player base and had both previously qualified for the Asia-Pacific championship in Singapore. At this point in time, there were few commercial games released using this formula (although many StarCraft and Warcraft III maps existed such as Aeon of Strife), but they decided it had the potential to be a commercial genre. This proved to be correct as multiple games of this type were released while RotT was being developed such as League of Legends and Heroes of Newerth.

RotT is the first title from developer Ningbo Shengguang Tianyi, which is a division of Qian's father's industrial conglomerate Ningbo Shengguang Industries.

== Gameplay ==
The gameplay is similar to Defense of the Ancients, wherein players battle in three lanes to accumulate experience and gold. Characters have four skills which may be upgraded after gaining experience.

In addition, there is a fifth skill which is not tied to character selection or experience; it can be changed every three minutes and becomes more potent every ten. It becomes a way to either supplement a character's weakness or complement its strength and can be switched as the game changes phase. There are 25 of these skills and may be active or passive in nature.

Another unique addition is the four bosses, four huge and unique NPCs in the four corners of the map. If the enemy bosses are killed, the player's own boss will charge down the center lane in the way that a normal "creep" NPC would.

As of 13 April 2018 there are 168 heroes in the Chinese version with new heroes added regularly.

Matchmaking is done by the average rating of the players in a team, rating is calculated by wins and losses as well as personal contributions to those results. Players are put into a match fitting certain conditions such as a similar rating (depending on the number of players online), the same ISP (China only), and that the number of teams on both sides may differ by at most one (therefore a side containing one team of 5 players may only battle another team of five, a team of four plus a lone player or a team of three plus a team of two).

== Reception ==
Realm of the Titans was received positively in China. It was particularly praised for its game balance, playability and production values. At the time of writing, Realm of the Titans has not yet received any official reviews in the West.
