= Super Monday Night Combat =

2012 video game

- Developer: Uber Entertainment
- Publisher: Uber Entertainment
- Engine: Unreal Engine 3
- Platform: Microsoft Windows
- Release: April 18, 2012
- Genres: Third-person shooter, multiplayer online battle arena
- Mode: Multiplayer

Super Monday Night Combat (or SMNC) was a free-to-play multiplayer online battle arena (MOBA) video game developed and published by Uber Entertainment for Microsoft Windows. The game is the sequel to Monday Night Combat. It was released on April 18, 2012. The game was inspired by Defense of the Ancients, a custom map and modification for Warcraft III: Reign of Chaos.

In May 2018, Uber Entertainment shut down Super Monday Night Combat's servers due to the game's low player count and lack of compliance with the European Union's General Data Protection Regulation (GDPR) mandate.

== Gameplay ==
Super Monday Night Combat puts players in a familiar position, but from a third-person perspective. Players begin playing by entering a matchmaking system that picks the number of required players in order to form a match.

Online game modes include Super Crossfire, Turbocross, and Super Blitz. Super Crossfire is a 5 versus 5 competitive online mode that consists of matches between the Hot Shots (red team) and the IceMen (the blue team). The main goal of the Super Crossfire mode is to destroy the opposing team's Money Ball through Bot hits, damage infliction and other in-game assaults. To win the game, players must venture beyond turrets that can only be destroyed by pushing Bots (non-player characters) through their lane. Once the bots reach the enemy turrets, the turrets' shield deactivates and players can destroy them to reach the Moneyball. As players destroy enemy bots and kill enemy players with guns, they gain money; awarding experience points that increase the character's level and allows for the upgrading of skills. The money looted can be spent to spawn more waves of bots, purchase products at vending machines to refill health and speed up the character, and activate multiple functioning buttons that vary depending on the map.

=== Turbocross ===
Since the gameplay was greatly changed from the predecessor Monday Night Combat, Uber Entertainment released a game mode with re-imagined gameplay, called Turbocross. Turbocross is a game mode that specializes in high speed and intense gameplay. Uber Entertainment modified the conventional format to appeal to a more "hardcore", or demanding fanbase. The game mode includes an increase of damage done by players, the ability to rebuild turrets once they are destroyed, slower health regeneration and permanent damage.

=== Super Blitz ===
Super Blitz is a survival mode that sets 5 players against the announcer of the game, GG Stack (voiced by Greg Stackhouse). Players face waves of bots aiming to take down the players' Moneyball while the announcer taunts them. As the match goes on, the announcer takes a break every 10 rounds to allow the player's time to build, rebuild or heal turrets and play various mini-games to prepare for the upcoming wave of bots. Although this mode does not have an end, every 10 rounds before the break, a final wave begins that spawns the strongest type of bots, Jackbots.

== Development ==
Super Monday Night Combat was announced on August 24, 2011, during Pax Prime 2011. As the sequel to Monday Night Combat, the game was largely expanded in terms of content and functions and greatly increased in accessibility because the game was free-to-play. The game began closed beta testing around October 2011 under an NDA, allowing the developer to communicate and receive feedback from testers.

The game's official release happened prematurely in April 2012 after Uber Entertainment accidentally released an unlimited-use product key on Steam that was meant to be used to invite a small number of playtesters. The incident resulted in a flood of new players and a quick decision to officially release the game rather than revoke the key.

After release, an update was released every week to every other week as the rules to the game changed. These included new content, such as new Pros, maps, game modes and equipment alongside multiple features, gameplay tweaks and bug fixes.

The original in-game sports commentator, Mickey Cantor (voiced by Rodney Sherwood), was later replaced by two new commentators, Chip Valvano and GG Stack. The game retained a reference to the original commentator through its miniboss "Chickey Cantor", a giant chicken who could be killed to receive a temporary power boost.

== Reception ==
Reception

Aggregate score
Aggregator	Score
Metacritic	76/100

Super Monday Night Combat received generally favorable reviews according to Metacritic, with an average rating of 76/100.

== See also ==
- Loadout – 2014 video game
- Team Fortress 2 – 2007 video game
- Deadlock (video game) – Upcoming video game
