= V scale (model railroading) =

V-scale, Vscale, or V scale (with V standing for virtual reality) is a scale of model railroading utilizing self-defining three-dimensional models and a compatible graphics engine to create an alternative modeled world. Though it has not been classified or recognized by either the NMRA or MOROP, the term Vscale has gradually taken on widescale de facto use in railfan and model railroading circles. V-scale model railroading was created when Japanese game developer Artdink released A-Train in 1985, but it was not widely popularized until Microsoft released Microsoft Train Simulator (sometimes referred to as MSTS) and Australia's Auran/N3V Games released the successful family of Trainz railroad simulators, both in 2001. With the ability to enter into the cab of a modeled train consist in a modeled landscape and track system, the 'play' modes of the two simulators gradually established a following among rail enthusiasts.

== Scale and scope ==
Unlike other scales, it is not a real world scale in the physical sense, but rather a representation of railroading in the virtual computing world, wherein dimensional constraints are mapped one-to-one with a virtual representation of the real world object. A centimeter is a centimeter, a meter maps to a metre, and a mile is a mile, unless the world builder decides to add an arbitrary scaling of his own.

Because there are no physical aspects to this scale, there are no limits (apart from those set by the program) as to the content that can be created. A V-scale railroad can literally be hundreds (and, in some cases, thousands) of simulated miles. Individual graphics objects (Track segment, a building, tree, fence, etc.) in such schemes are self-defining collections of source files grouped into a data-set interpretable by the graphics engine. Assigned an 'attachment' point in a virtual surface, graphics software enables three dimensional interaction such as walking around, climbing over top, and animation effects such as driving and watching passing virtual terrain. The computer operator becomes immersed in a virtual world modeled by the creator.

== Software ==
Currently, there are a number of programs that are used for 3-D model railroading. Among them are the aforementioned MSTS, Open Rails (which currently uses the routes and rolling stock from MSTS), Auran's Trainz, Rail Simulator, published by Electronic Arts in partnership with Kuju Entertainment, and its successor Railworks, published by Rail Simulator Developments Ltd.

With these programs, virtually any type of locomotive (whether it is powered by diesel, steam, or electric) or piece of rolling stock can be created to run in any combination of train-cars (consists) (unless limited by the software). Likewise, routes (or layouts) can be created allowing the virtual consists to be run as closely as possible to real world train operations. One such program, Train Player, allows one to build virtual track layouts as though they were built in real life.

== Operating systems ==
V-scale railroading is not limited to Windows based platforms. N3V Games has released versions for smartphones and tablets, and Trainz Simulator: Mac for the Macintosh. A second Macintosh computer program, TrainPlayer-TrackLayer, allows one to build a virtual modem layout in conjunction with RailModeller.

However, virtual model railroading is not embraced by all in a story covered by PRWEB which focuses on a mega-spender who has dedicated thousands of man-hours to first building and then touring a large model railroad as an exhibit.

Many users of V-scale railroading run virtual railroading organizations as if it were a real world corporation, complete with timeslips and engineer applications. Examples of such are sites like the Pacific & American Railroad and the North Eastern Railroad.

== See also ==
- Category:Train simulation video games
- List of rail transport modelling scale standards
- Model railroading
- Rail transport modelling scales
