= TS2 =

TS2 may refer to:

- Microsoft Train Simulator 2, a train simulator that was being developed by Microsoft Game Studios
- TeamSpeak 2, a proprietary Voice over IP software
- The Sims 2, a 2004 strategic life simulation computer game
- TimeSplitters 2, a 2002 first-person shooter video game
- Toy Story 2, a 1999 American animated comedy film
- TS 2, an Internet service provider for U.S. Army soldiers in Afghanistan
- TS2 (postal code), see TS postcode area

== See also ==
- T2S, a European securities settlement engine
- TSS (disambiguation)
