= Trainz Railway Simulator 2006 =

2005 train simulation video game

- UK box art, depicting a white SNCF TGV
- Developer: Auran
- Publishers: AU: Auran; UK: Just Trains (Note: The re-release of the game was published by Focus Multimedia.); NA: Merscom; DEN/FIN/ISL/NOR/SWE: Nordic Softsales; DE: Blue Sky Interactive
- Producer: Scott Probin
- Designers: Henk Plaggemars; Scott Probin; Christoph Bergmann; Cliff Cawley; Greg Lane
- Programmers: Christoph Bergmann; Cliff Cawley; François Coulombe
- Artists: David Affran; Ian Manion; Vaughan Kidd; Jason Robson
- Series: Trainz
- Engine: Auran Jet
- Platform: Microsoft Windows
- Release: AU: 30 August 2005; EU: 30 September 2005; NA: 2 February 2006
- Genres: Train simulation, strategy
- Modes: Single-player, multiplayer (Note: Via iPortal.)

Trainz Railway Simulator 2006, (Note: Released as Trainz Railroad Simulator 2006 in the United States, and as ProTrain Perfect in Germany.) often shortened to simply Trainz 2006 and abbreviated as TRS2006, is a 2005 train simulation strategy video game developed by Auran. It is the third major release in the Trainz series of video games, following Trainz Railway Simulator 2004. The game features several new metrics, including a content management program, a custom content creation program, new routes, new locomotives and rolling stock, and an in-game online chatting feature called iTrainz.

It was released on Microsoft Windows on 30 August 2005 in Australia, on 30 September 2005 in Europe, and on 2 February 2006 in North America. It received mixed critical reviews, with praise for its abundance of new content, control system, and refined tutorials, though it was criticized for the visuals, camera settings, and technical issues.

== Gameplay ==
Screenshot of the game on the session "Branch Freight Passive" in Driver mode.

Similar to Trainz Railway Simulator 2004, Trainz Railway Simulator 2006's gameplay centers on operating 3D computer-generated model locomotives (both steam and diesel) through two modes: DCC mode (used via a dial controller, providing simplified controlling) and CAB mode (simulating a realistic, in-cab driving experience with authentic physics). In addition to the regular driving modes, the game also features a Surveyor mode, which allows users to create custom routes by shaping landscapes, laying tracks and infrastructure, adding scenery, and create sessions.

The game also features the Railyard, which allows users to view several locomotives and rolling stock built into the game itself, as well as Content Manager Plus (CMP), a revamped version of Trainz Railway Simulator 2004's Content Dispatcher (CD). Paintshed, a re-skinning tool that allowed users to customize the paintwork of locomotives, was also included. Content Creator Plus (CCP) was also included, allowing users to create the config text documents necessary for Trainz assets, which also helped with the process of general content creation. It also helped with updating configuration files to the latest build of Trainz. A digital chatting feature, iTrainz, allowed users from across the world to communicate with each other in-game, and the companion iPortal feature allowed players to send their trains to other users' maps if they had an iPortal on their designated route.

The game also featured several built-in driving sessions for users to play, including the British Midlands, the Marias Pass approach in Montana, the Toronto yards as they appeared in 1954, the Hawes Junction Settle and Carlisle main line (serving as a demo of Trainz Classics 3), the Australian Outback, and Winter in the Swiss Alps.

== Release ==
Trainz Railway Simulator 2006 was released on Microsoft Windows on 30 August 2005 in Australia, on 30 September 2005 in Europe, and on 2 February 2006 in North America. A trailer for the game was released on 24 July 2005. It was published by Auran in Australia, Just Trains (later Focus Multimedia in the game's re-release) in the United Kingdom, Merscom in North America, Nordic Softsales in Scandinavia, and Blue Sky Interactive in Germany.

Prior to the release of the game, Auran had "a tough decision" that was to be made: release the game on one DVD, or on five CDs. Ultimately, the game was released on both, while the limited edition DVD release sold out at pre-order. The DVD release included an exclusive video produced by Main Line Motion Pictures.

== Reception ==
Reception

Aggregate score
Aggregator	Score
Metacritic	65/100

Review scores
Publication	Score
GameSpot	8.7/10
PC Gamer (UK)	61%
PC Zone	5.2/10

Trainz Railway Simulator 2006 received "mixed or average" reviews based on six critics, according to review aggregator Metacritic. Despite being deemed inferior to its predecessor Trainz Railway Simulator 2004, with criticism to the visuals, camera settings, and technical issues, the game was praised for its abundance of new additional content, its control system, and its refined tutorials.

Walter Hurdle of PC Gameworld gave the game a mixed review, writing that it's "A sim that is not for everybody. A smorgasbord of pleasure for train geeks. The cure for insomnia for the rest of us." He praised the multiple playing modes, though criticized the visuals, camera settings, and "superfluous Track IR support". In a 5.2 out of 10 review, PC Zone wrote, "Apart from the amount of content, things haven't moved on much since the 2004 version. A few nips and tucks here and there, refined content controls, better tutorials and a slight expansion of the simulation 'rules' to make driving your choochoos a touch harder, but otherwise it all looks much the same as before." In an 8.7 out of 10 review, Scott Osborne of GameSpot commented that "it's fun and easy to build your own model railroad" in the game, and praised the scenery in each scenario, calling it "rich with visual and aural detail".

Jeff Gedgaud of Game Chronicles gave the film a score of 8.2 out of 10, writing: "I don't like Sim games that much and only considered doing this one because I am interested in model railroading." He gave the sound a score of 9, saying "[It's] an area that you would be surprised to find much to mention about in a game like this but it works very well indeed," and gave the graphics a score of 7, saying "The graphics in the Driver portion are not the best but they work very well for this type of game. When you're in your engine and working your way through a layout[,] you can see the grey and yellow squares that don't get quite enough texture paint on them." Tory Favro of Impulse Gamer gave the film an 8.0 out of 10 rating, and wrote: "If you are a train nut, you are going to go wild over this and have even less of a life than you most likely already have. Make sure you are up to speed with all your jargon however as there is a lot of it featured in the game and not a lot of explaining done as to what it all means." In a 12 out of 20 review, Frédéric FAU of Jeuxvideos.com wrote that the game was "far from being a revolution compared to the 2004 version", also noting that the game left "a feeling of incompleteness". He also wrote that the game "is best suited to an experienced audience who [isn't] afraid of the austere presentation and occasional instability issues."

=== In popular culture ===
Similarly to Trainz Railway Simulator 2004, through Trainz Railway Simulator 2006's custom content system, fan-made model recreations of characters from the television programme Thomas & Friends were popularised since its release.

== Trainz: Driver Edition ==
Trainz: Driver Edition
- Developer: Auran
- Publishers: NA: Merscom; AU: Auran
- Series: Trainz
- Platform: Microsoft Windows
- Release: NA: 19 September 2006; AU: 11 January 2007
- Genres: Train simulation, strategy
- Mode: Single-player

Trainz: Driver Edition is a 2006 train simulation strategy video game that serves as a compact version of the base Trainz Railway Simulator 2006 game. The game does not include the Content Manager, the ability to download additional content, or the Surveyor mode. The game contained only the Railyard and Driver modes.

The game was released in North America on 19 September 2006, and in Australia on 11 January 2007.
