= American Train Dispatchers Association =

American trade union representing railroad workers

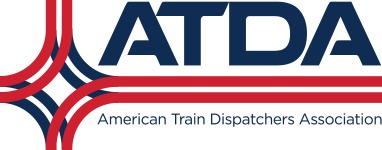
- Founded: 1917
- Headquarters: 4239 W. 150th Street, Cleveland, Ohio, 44135, USA
- Location: United States
- Members: 2,718
- President: L. Ed Dowell
- Key people: Bill Sikes, Secretary-Treasurer
- Affiliations: AFL–CIO
- Website: Official website

The American Train Dispatchers Association (Train Dispatchers) is an American trade union representing railroad workers. The Train Dispatchers belong to the AFL–CIO as one of the organization's smallest members.

== About ==
ATDA is a craft union representing American railroad workers. While most of ATDA's members are Train Dispatchers (aka Rail Traffic Controllers), the Organization also represents Power Directors, Power Supervisors, Load Dispatchers, Maintenance of Way employees, Bridge Operators, Footboard Yardmasters, Bridge Operators, Assistant Chief Dispatchers, and those working in Train and Engine service.

ATDA represents train dispatchers in the United States, including those employed by all but one Class I railroad, Amtrak, several commuter rail operators, and numerous short-line railroads.

== Railroads where ATDA represents workers ==
The Train Dispatchers hold collective bargaining agreements with the following companies:

- Alaska Railroad
- Amtrak
- Burlington Northern and Santa Fe Railway
- Belt Railway of Chicago
- Conrail Shared Assets
- CSX
- Genesee & Wyoming
- Indiana Harbor Belt Railroad
- Kansas City Southern Railway
- Kiamichi Railroad
- Louisville & Indiana Railroad
- Massachusetts Bay Commuter Railroad
- Metra
- Montana Rail Link
- New Jersety Transit
- Norfolk Southern
- PATH
- Soo Line (CP)
- South Shore Line
- Sunrail
- Staten Island Railway
- Terminal Railroad Association of St. Louis
- Tri-Rail
- Wisconsin Central Ltd. (CN)

== History ==
The union was founded in 1917 at a convention in Spokane, Washington. An earlier organization called the Train Dispatchers Association of America preceded the establishment of the ATDA by 27 years. During the Great Railroad Strike of 1922, the Train Dispatchers did not participate but neither would they perform work of other unions.

== See also ==
- Rail traffic controller
- Train Dispatcher (computer simulation)
