= BVE =

BVE may stand for:

- BVE Trainsim
- Black Vernacular English
  - In the United States
  - In the United Kingdom
- Bachelor of Vocational Education
- Batallón Vasco Español
- The IATA airport code of Brive–Souillac Airport
