= Named electrical trains in Saint Petersburg =

During rolling stock operation in the USSR and Russia some local trains (elektrichkas) were given their own official names.

Train name (translated)	Train number	Train name in Russian	Image	Building date	Cars	Service point	Pension off	Note
170 years of the Russian Railway	ET2M-047	170 лет РЖД		2002, April	10	TCH-10 Okt rw (St. Petersburg)	In-commission (July 29, 2008)	The name was given in August 2007 while the train undergoing major repairs at the October electrocar-repair factory. The name celebrates the 170th anniversary of Russian Railway
Karelia	ER_{2}-1290	Карелия		1982, August	10	TCH-20 Okt rw (St. Petersburg)	In-commission (Mar 28th, 2008)	Named in the Spring of 1985, the train was in service for at least one period without a name
Neva	ER_{2}-1283	Нева	Train under the name NEVA at the Finlyandsky Rail Terminal	1982, June	10	TCH-20 Okt rw (St. Petersburg)	In-commission (Mar 29th, 2009 - see image)	In 2002 car ER_{2}-128309 was gutted by a fire.; It acquired its name in December 2008.
Russia	ER_{2}-1221	Россия			10 or 12	With 1980 on the end of 1980s - TCH-1 Okt rw (Moscow); From the end of 1980s in August 2007 - TCH-10 Okt rw (St. Petersburg); With August 2007 - TCH-20 Okt rw (St. Petersburg)	In-commission (February 15, 2009)	Given a name at the moment of receipt, its name was lost at some point, and was renamed in August, 2007
Smena (transition, change)	ER_{2}-1348	Смена	Train under the name Smena at the Finlyandsky Rail Terminal	1984, August	10	TCH-20 Okt rw (St. Petersburg)	In-commission (August 2, 2008)	Car ER_{2}-134802 was written off in 1993; Car ER_{2}-134807 was written off before 2009; Trainz Railroad Simulator 2006 features this train.
Express	ET2ML-077	Экспресс	Train under the name Express at the Baltiisky rail terminal					
Express	ET2ML-078	Экспресс	Train under the name Express at the Devyatkino railway station					

Trains in other railways of Russia
Train name (translated)	Train number	Train name in Russian	Image	Building date	Cars	Service point	Pension off	Note
170 years of the Russian Railway	ET2M-105	170 лет РЖД		October 2007	8	TCH-11 KBSh Kuibish rw (Bezimyanka)	In-commission (2007)	
