= RailDriver =

Desktop gaming controller for train simulation

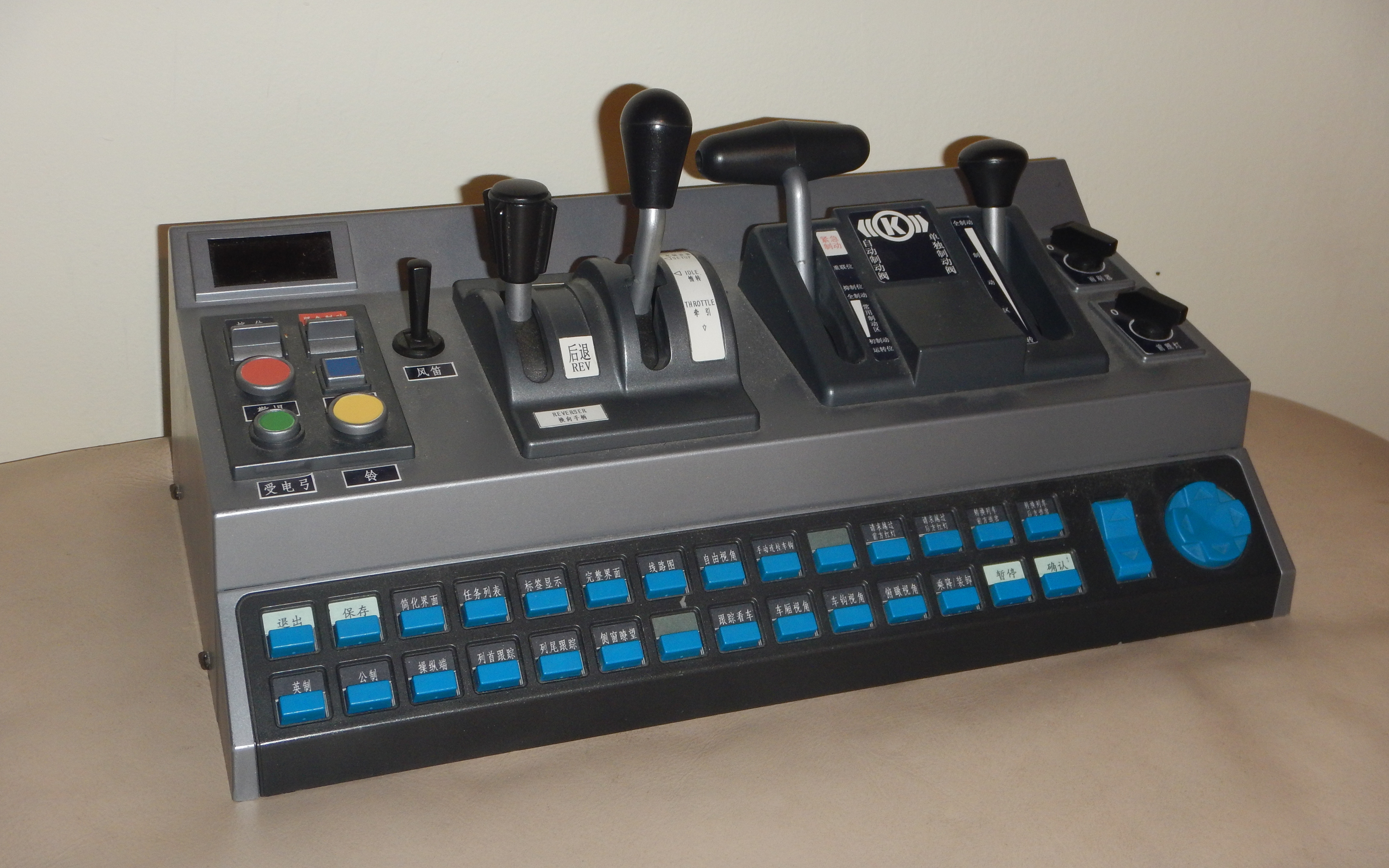
- Type: Game controller
- Game type: Train simulator
- Supported games: Trainz Railroad Simulator 2022; Train Simulator Classic; Train Sim World 2, 3, 4, 5 & 6; Trainz Railroad Simulator 2019; Diesel Railcar Simulator; Trainz: A New Era; Trainz 2009 / 2010 / 12; Run8; My First Trainz Set; Trainz Railwayz / 2006; Trainz Classics; Trainz 2004; World of Subways 2 & 3; TrainMaster 4.3; Microsoft Train Simulator; Open Rails
- OS: Windows 2000, XP, Vista, 7, 8, 10, 11
- Connection: USB (2.0/3.0)
- Size: 34cm × 18cm × 10cm
- Weight: 4.3 kg
- Controls: Throttle, reverser, brake, horn, 34 programmable buttons
- Other features: Speedometer, speakers
- Price: $219.95 (USD); £229.99 (UK and Scandinavia); €219.99 (Europe); $279.99 (CAD); $449.95 (AUS with TS 2019)
- Release date: 2003 (initial release)
- Manufacturer: P.I. Engineering, Williamston, Michigan
- Website: www.raildriver.com

RailDriver is a desktop cab controller for train simulation software made by P.I. Engineering. It replaces keyboard and mouse operation as far as possible to provide a more realistic train driving experience. It is designed to be compatible with Microsoft Train Simulator. N3V's Trainz, BVE Trainsim and World of Subways also support RailDriver. As of December 2020, Dovetail Games' Train Sim World 2 added an open beta for Raildriver on PC. Other software may be controlled using downloadable resources.

== Controls ==
RailDriver includes the basic throttle, reverser, and brake levers as separate control handles that mimic generic operation of real locomotive controls. Frequently used switches for lights, sand, bell, and whistle are also included, with programmable switches for other frequently used functions. For operations such as camera movement the RailDriver has a four-way pan pad with zoom rocker switches.

== Compatibility ==
Microsoft Train Simulator does not come with an application programming interface included. Therefore, RailDriver uses alternative methods to communicate with the software. It reads settings directly from the heads-up display on the screen, which therefore must be in view at all times when using the hardware. To operate RailDriver with Train Simulator it is necessary to run additional software supplied with the product.

Kuju Rail Simulator announced in August 2008 that they would make their product compatible with RailDriver.

Zusi 3 provides full compatibility with Raildriver.

A downloadable software development kit enables users to integrate other applications with RailDriver, or even use it to control model railways.
