= Trainz =

Train simulator video game series

- Box art for 32 bit Trainz Simulator 12 depicting a Norfolk and Western Y6b
- Genre: Train simulation
- Developer: N3V Games (formerly Auran)
- Platforms: Microsoft Windows, MacOS, iPad, Android, iPhone
- First release: Trainz; October 2001
- Latest release: Trainz World Tour XBOX; 2025

Trainz is an ongoing series of 3D train simulator video games produced by the Australian studio N3V Games (formerly Auran), the first installment being released in October 2001. Each installment of the series implements realistic or fictional simulated railway operations (Driver) alongside the ability to create custom maps (Surveyor) and contains a vast collection of real-life rolling stock for the user to drive in their maps. The games are known for their support for user-created custom content (trains, scenery, maps). The ability to use custom content was originally introduced in Trainz 1.1.1, but was not officially implemented until the release of Ultimate Trainz Collection.

== Gameplay ==
Screenshot of TRS2004 or Trainz Railroad Simulator 2004 in driver mode, showing third-party British rolling stock in a rail yard scene.

In the route editor, Surveyor, the user can shape the landscape, paint with ground textures, lay tracks, and place buildings and roads. The user then operates the trains in Driver, either in free play, or according to a scenario called a Driver Session (previously called Scenarios in the early versions of Trainz, Ultimate Trainz Collection, and TRS2004) which can range in difficulty from beginner to expert. In CAB (cabin) mode the train physics are more sophisticated than in DCC mode; adding real-life considerations such as wheel slip on the rails; how the weight of the consist slows acceleration and deceleration. Any train can be given directions to be driven by the computer.

Screenshot of TS12 or Trainz Simulator 12 in driver mode showing an Amtrak HHP-8 at 30th Street Station

=== Other software ===
The simulators are supported by a large library of freeware assets which can be downloaded from the N3V servers, referred to as the Download Station (DLS). Unless users purchase a First Class Ticket with real money, download speeds for the DLS (both in Content Manager and directly through File Transfer Protocol on the Trainz website) are throttled. PaintShed is a simple program for aiding and easing the process of 'reskinning' traincars, altering their livery, by recoloring and adding new heraldry to Trainz locomotives and other rolling stock. The Content Manager (CM) module is a Windows program that allows management of the in-game database files. It was renamed under the name of Content Manager Plus (CMP) in TRS2006.

Trainz rolling stock assets were also used in a Microsoft Train Simulator expansion pack dubbed the "Regional Add-On Pack", which allowed users to drive locomotives used in Trainz in MSTS maps, with some locomotives being unused in the former altogether, such as an ATSF Dash 9, UP DD40AX, and a Penn Central GG1. Another add-on, "MSTS Paintshed", was basically a reskinned version of the Trainz Paintshed module, which allowed users to make reskins of the same templates found in Trainz Paintshed, and export them to MSTS. Both of these add-on releases were created by N3V, originally Auran at the time.

== Games ==
Release timeline
2001	Trainz
2002	Ultimate Trainz Collection
2003	Trainz Railroad Simulator 2004
2004
2005	Trainz Railway Simulator 2006
2005	Trainz Driver
2006
2007	Trainz Railway Simulator 2007
2007	Trainz Classics (TC1-TC3)
2007	Trainz Railway Simulator 2008
2008	Trainz Simulator 2009: World Builder Edition
2008	Trainz – The Complete Collection
2009	Trainz Simulator 2010: Engineer's Edition
2010	My First Trainz Set
2011	Trainz Simulator 12
2011	Trainz Simulator (iPad, Android)
2011	Trainz Simulator (Mac)
2012	Trainz Driver (iPhone)
2013
2014	Trainz Simulator 2 Mac
2014	Trainz Driver 2 (iPhone)
2015	Trainz: A New Era
2016
2017
2018	Trainz Railroad Simulator 2019
2019
2020
2021	Trainz Simulator 3 (mobile)
2021	Trainz Railroad Simulator 2022
2022
2023
2024
2025	Trainz Simulator: World Tour

=== Trainz ===
The first ever version of Trainz originally began as a set of downloadable files in 2000, eventually becoming Trainz 0.9, which was a CD-ROM beta that was mailed to testers by Auran. The front cover of the beta donned a SBB Ce 6/8 II "Krokodil" locomotive in front of a mountainous terrain. The "Krokodil" locomotive would later become an official addon for the budding game.

Another train simulator, Microsoft Train Simulator released roughly one year after the beta released to testers, and both Trainz and MSTS proved to be fierce competitors. As a rebuttal to the GE Dash 9-44CW model used in MSTS, Auran had created their own version intended for usage in Trainz. However, it, alongside many 3D models of American, Canadian, British, German, Swedish, Russian, Australian, Italian, and Spanish rolling stock went unused in the final release.

Trainz Community Edition was released in December 2001, with Service packs 1 (April), 2 (June) and 3 (November) being released in 2002, in which they progressively updated the Community Edition, Trainz 1.0, to versions 1.1, 1.2, and 1.3 successively. Two retail builds (retail versions releases) existed; the English/USA version is commonly known as Trainz 1.0.

Trainz Retail Edition was released in June 2002 aimed at the United States and other North American markets. Service pack 3 was released in November 2002, this updated both the Community and Retail Editions to version 1.3. Thus all USA versions are commonly known as Trainz 1.3.

The Ultimate Trainz Collection, informally abbreviated as UTC, also known as Trainz 1.5, was released on 26 November 2002 in North America as a 3-CD set including extra rolling stock, and a CD-ROM with TrainzScript-based scenarios and route map content based on Trainz 1.3 tech. This was the first edition to include the formerly separately retailed PaintShed program and support RailDriver, as well as the first incorporating Trainz user developed freeware content as part of the release, some of which became Trainz staple content in TRS2004 et al. through current releases.

==== Special hardware support ====
The desktop cab controller RailDriver was first supported for use in Service Pack 1 for the Ultimate Trainz Collection, and is also supported by all subsequent Trainz releases.

=== Trainz Railroad Simulator 2004 ===
Trainz Railroad Simulator 2004 (known as Trainz Railway Simulator 2004 in the United Kingdom), or TRS2004, was released in September 2003. Trainz Railroad Simulator 2004 incorporated a load of technical changes and these required many bug fixes that were released as four service packs throughout 2004 and 2005.

Trainz Railroad Simulator 2004 was the first version of Trainz to include interactive industries and loadable rolling stock capabilities, which allow the player to deliver various resources (such as coal, wood, and steel) and passengers to various industries and stations across the playable area. There were many industries included and much of the bundled rolling stock was updated to include this new dynamic loading and unloading animated capability with a corresponding load-state dynamic driving physics change in the handling of a consist. It was also the first version of the Trainz series to have built-in steam engines.

Trainz Railroad Simulator 2004 Deluxe was a later 4 CDROM follow on with the first two service packs pre-installed. It also included PaintShed, and a bonus content CD.

TRS2004 and earlier versions utilized a program titled "Content Dispatcher". Instead of the more streamlined Content Manager Plus (which was introduced in the subsequent TRS2006 release), Content Dispatcher was designed for File Transfer Protocol (FTP) downloads. Included with TRS2004 was also "Trainz Helper", which helped users download dependent files for their addons. TRS2006's Content Manager Plus rendered Content Dispatcher and the Trainz Helper obsolete since CMP could handle all of these tasks in one straightforward program.

=== Trainz Railway Simulator 2006 ===
Trainz Railway Simulator 2006 (known as Trainz Railroad Simulator 2006 in the USA), or TRS2006, was a transitional release, incorporating the stable Auran JET based TRS2004 GUI modules with only some graphics improvements, but introducing the data base manager Content Manager Plus (CMP) as a new core technology. ContentManager.exe (now called just CM) combines data base management, and secure FTP upload and download facilities and special user definable filters all in one integrated system. By defining a good filter, the user could 'selectively not see' the clutter of regional items in the Surveyor asset selection menus saving user time when world building. This important filtering feature was further improved in Trainz 2009, becoming far more powerful and easier to use.

In addition to these improvements, several new routes were included, such as Hawes Junction (representing a small section of the Settle and Carlisle Railway and serving as a demo for TC3), Toronto Rail Lands 1954 (representing Toronto's sprawling railyard in 1954), and Marias Pass Approach (representing the BNSF Marias Pass line between Shelby, Montana and Cut Bank, Montana and serving as a demo for the full Marias Pass payware route). TRS2006 was published in September 2005, and the base release with its single service pack formed the core of the regional releases (most are joint ventures with 'Trainz Partners' combining payware content provider's products with the base Trainz software) over the next four years until the introduction of new technologies in TC3 and TRS2009.

In 2006, SP1 for TRS2006 was released. It introduces several changes to Content Manager Plus alongside inclusion of the Monorail Project, a content pack that recreates the Walt Disney World Monorail System in Trainz.

TRS2006 was the last ever version of Trainz to incorporate PaintShed. Instead of being a separately sold program, TRS2006 incorporated PaintShed within Content Manager Plus. Since the Trainz community had begun to sideline PaintShed in favor of third-party programs that directly edited texture files used in Trainz assets, Auran had quickly outmoded PaintShed after TRS2006.

In Germany, it was published by Bluesky-Interactive, as ProTrain Perfect.

==== Trainz Driver ====
Trainz Driver (also known as Trainz: Driver Edition (TDE) in North America) is a version of Trainz Railroad Simulator 2006 released in 2006, lacking the Content Manager and Surveyor GUI world building module, having only the Driver and Railyard modules. Note this is precisely the formula utilized with the 2011-2016 release of iPhone and iPad-based Trainz releases, as well as the short-lived Trainz Driver 2016.

- The package includes three large routes with 21 driver sessions, all set in North America. Trainz Driver is the first instance when Auran turned to blatant marketing measures to boost sales. Current CEO Tony Hilliam had taken on an increasing role in company management beginning in 2005, and by 2008 would end up a principle investor in Auran with rights to develop and distribute the Trainz franchise.
- Over the same three-year period, Auran licensed eight separate 'Regional releases' based on the stable JET2 (TRS2004/TRS2006) game engine releases aimed at opening new market niches. These versions had few game improvements, and Driver and Surveyor were technically equivalent to The TRS2004-TRS2006 games, albeit, given new skins and better graphics interfacing. Prior to those releases, if you had a high end graphics system, to let the game know about your superior hardware you had to edit an ini file called TrainzOptions.txt with apropos height and width entries.

==== Trainz Railroad Simulator 2007 ====
Trainz Railroad Simulator 2007 (abbreviated as TRS2007) was the second release targeting a regional market distributed by Anuman Interactive for sale in France, Belgium and Switzerland. There were initially two versions: the standard version which consisted of Trainz Railroad Simulator 2006 with Service Pack 1 applied, and the Gold edition, which included French regional add-on items. Halycon Media later distributed Trainz Railroad Simulator 2007 with German region-specific content for the British, Austrian, and Swiss market. This release version of TRS2007 was not available in American markets, though the Gold edition content was included in later games.

==== Trainz Classics (TC1—TC3) ====
Trainz Classics, also abbreviated as TC (TC1, TC2, TC3), is a series of 3 standalone Trainz Railroad Simulator 2006 joint venture customizations put together by Auran and different professional providers of third party content. Unlike typical Trainz releases which feature a round-the-world sampling of content typical to different regions of the planet, the Trainz Classics versions feature a large railroad layout with plenty of special professionally written sessions exploiting the featured railroad. Trainz Classics 3 renewed evolution of the Trainz base technologies incorporating various changes to the older stable four-year-old data models resulting in the publication of a new .pdf file TC3 Content Creator's Guide.

TC1 focuses on the Metro-North Railroad's Harlem Line in the 2000s (due to EMD FL9 locomotives still being in service), TC2 focuses on a freelanced city called "Modula City", featuring European trams running in the city and to an island (a demo version was included with TRS2004). TC3 focuses on the famed Settle-Carlisle Line from Skipton to Carlisle in the late 1950s/early 1960s during the steam-diesel transition.

Demos of Modula City and the Settle-Carlisle line were included in TRS2006, along with a limited amount of content in unrefined states.

The content from Trainz Classics 1 and 2 were later released as built-content for TS2009 and TS2010, and can be downloaded from the DLS for all future games. Trainz Classics 3 was re-released as an expansion pack for all subsequent games as the Settle & Carlisle Route, with extra content added from the original release (some of the Mark 1 coaches in BR Blue were also included by default in these versions due to being used in the consists of trains on the built-in East Coast Main Line routes).

TRS2008

A version of Trainz Classics which included regional French content and staple content from previous games was also published by Anuman Interactive. This version of Trainz was built on the Trainz Classics interface which later paved the way for future Trainz releases.

==== Trainz – The Complete Collection ====
Released 13 June 2008. This is a large compilation, containing three DVD's: Ultimate Trainz Collection, TRS2004, TRS2006, Trainz Routes (volumes 1–4), and Trainz PaintShed.

==== Trainz Simulator 2009: World Builder Edition ====
Released in 2008, Trainz Simulator 2009 received the "World Builder Edition" name from its greatly improved Surveyor and graphics capabilities such as better terrain tools, quad detail and normal-mapped terrain, new stitched track modelling technique, a large collection of stock assets, and performance improvements to allow for higher detail trains, terrain, textures, and routes. It also introduced improved physics, Content Manager v2.0, new screenshot and video capture functions, user interface improvements, and an embedded web browser for easier community interaction.

==== Trainz Simulator 2010: Engineer's Edition ====
Trainz Simulator 2010, or TS2010, introduced improved graphics capabilities, Speedtree technology, an overhauled user interface, seasonal assets, and layer support in Surveyor. TS2010 also introduced Native Mode, which allowed the game to harness new 64-bit processing, while retaining a Compatibility Mode for older 32-bit computer architectures and better performance with older routes and assets marked as "Faulty" due to stricter code enforcement.

Service Pack 4 introduced an early version of multiplayer, but also controversially removed Compatibility Mode.

=== Trainz Simulator: iPad, Android ===
To celebrate the 10th anniversary of Trainz, N3V Games released a Trainz app for the iPad on 4 December 2010. Users can lay tracks, drive trains. Users have access to Driver and Surveyor and can create routes and drive trains with the help of tutorials. An Android version of the game was released on 22 July 2011 and has the same features as the iPad version. The app is a port of Trainz Simulator 2009.

Despite being released before Trainz Simulator 12, however, Trainz Simulator utilizes a doppler effect that would later be found in the aforementioned Trainz release.

=== Trainz Simulator 12 ===
Trainz Simulator 12, or TS12, was released on 12 April 2011. Among other upgrades, this product offers a variety of new routes, doppler effect support, satellite view, and a multiplayer feature for the first time (multiplayer was publicly tested in TS2010 SP4). A Trainz 10th Anniversary Boxset was announced which includes the game and other extras. The game was initially released for pre-order on 18 March 2011 as part of the limited-edition Trainz 10th Anniversary Collector's Edition. A certain amount of content from previous versions was removed from this release, making it the first release since Trainz 1.0 to feature all and only new routes and related assets. Like most Trainz releases, the package contains only content vetted for the new technology, which in TS12 needed to be updated for compatibility with 64 bit computers. However, much of the content (not all of it) from the previous versions was released on the Download Station (DLS) in an updated form as of the end of 2012 under an initiative known as the "Download Station Cleanup".

=== My First Trainz Set ===
My First Trainz Set was designed for the younger generation who do not want to worry about realism or management when playing the Trainz game. The game features 4 locations to lay track in that are based on rooms throughout a house, such as a bedroom or kitchen. The user has the ability to place down small toy-like objects in the replacement of buildings and scenery. However, its graphical quality of the trains, track, and objects is still very much like that of the standard Trainz simulator games. Controls are also far more simplified. The game was also ported to Android devices.

=== Trainz Simulator: Mac ===
Trainz Simulator: Mac was a port of Trainz Simulator 2010 for the Mac.

=== Trainz Driver: iPhone ===
Trainz Driver leveraged the work done porting Trainz Simulator onto iPad and brought the driving aspect of the Trainz franchise to mobile phones for the first time. With mechanics similar to the earlier Trainz Driver Edition, it was designed for players who preferred to operate trains as opposed to building routes. Trainz Driver offered both realistic and arcade sessions.

=== Trainz Simulator 2 Mac ===
Trainz Simulator 2 Mac was released on 27 March 2014 via the Mac App Store, which amongst other things, introduced an online multiplayer feature. It is a port of Trainz 12.

=== Trainz Driver 2: iPhone ===
Trainz Driver 2 leveraged the iPad updates and introduced the powerful route editing tools to the phone. It has TS2009's game engine built into it. Conversely, Trainz Simulator 2 for the iPad was released around the same time. The user interface from the original Trainz Driver would also be implemented in the Trainz Simulator 2 iPad release.

Both Trainz Driver 2 and Trainz Simulator 2 have been criticized for packaging community-made freeware content as payware content.

=== Trainz: A New Era ===
Trainz: A New Era is, as noted in the new naming convention, a new beginning for the Trainz franchise. In November 2013, a Kickstarter campaign for the game was launched to help fund the game and the new purpose-built game engine. The campaign reached its target funding level a month later. Contributors were awarded prizes ranging from desktop wallpapers, First Class Tickets for the Download Station, full copies of the game, and various additional content depending on the amount pledged.

- The game utilizes a new custom designed 64 bit game engine, which features far more realistic (lifelike) graphics, slightly improved train physics, and various other new features and improvements led by a top ten hit-list drawn up by the user community on the forums between September and November 2013.
- Subsequently, a download only release, the 'TANE Community Edition' was released in mid-December 2014. The new game was officially released as a retail version for wide distribution on 15 May 2015, though it was rather bare bones, lacking many normal User Interface features such as Content Manager hotkeys, a working minimap and like UX multiplier factors.
- A whole series of bug fixing hotfix software updates were released throughout the year, and often these would incrementally improve UI lacks and so gradually raise the UX. On 12 January 2016, the long delayed Service Pack 1, which had finally passed a succession of hurdles, was released, heralding a new stage of stability and capability. Major Kickstarter contributors also could participate in Beta testing in addition to a dedicated in-house employee team testing new code, so hundreds participated in moving the new technology into matured stability. Two hotfixes followed after just a month and a half, one after the other a week apart on 11 March 2016 (build 81190) and 18 March 2016 (build 81296), but normal UI to recapture UX operations of earlier Trainz versions aside from Driver were still lacking in hotfix2. Several of the CM hotkeys were reinstated with the second hotfix, and N3V announced that Service Pack 2 beta candidate builds would be coming soon, implying the rapid rebuilding of the Trainz customary UX may not be far behind. On 16 June 2017, SP2 was finally released and introduced over 1,000 individual fixes and updates. A little over a year later, SP3 was released on 11 July 2018 and included many bug fixes and improvements to AI, Multiplayer, stability, and performance.

=== Trainz Railroad Simulator 2019 ===
On 11 May 2018, N3V Games announced a new version of Trainz featuring better graphics, Physically-Based Rendering, Parallax Occlusion Mapping and more content than ever before. Early Access was released in July 2018 and the game was officially launched 7 January 2019. It is also the first entry in the series since TRS2006 to feature the "Trainz Railroad Simulator" moniker, possibly to avoid confusion with "Train Simulator" by Dovetail Games. The game uses whole-game DRM in all versions, whereas certain versions of Trainz: A New Era could be purchased and run offline. This requires that the game is connected to the internet at least once a month in order for the game and content to continue functioning. TRS19 was primarily offered as subscription model, although a one-time purchase (but with the monthly DRM check still required) is also available via the Trainz Store and Steam. It also has the ability to download content from the Download Station (DLS) while in the game; though without the purchase of so-called "first class tickets" (limited-duration speed upgrades) the download speed is severely throttled.

==== Full Editions ====
There are two editions offered:

- Standard Edition - The baseline version, which includes six routes: Kickstarter County 2 (an updated version of the Kickstarter County route from T:ANE), Canadian Rockies - Golden, BC (featuring the Canadian Pacific Mountain and Wildemere subdivisions, on which the Rocky Mountaineer runs), Sebino Lake, Italy (representing the Ferrovienord line from Brescia to Pisogne in the 1980s), Niddertalbahn (representing Main-Weser-Bahn from Bad Vilbel to Stockheim), Edinburgh-Dundee (representing the East Coast Main Line from Edinburgh Waverley to Dundee in 1976, serving as an extension of the main ECML route from King's Cross to Edinburgh in T:ANE), and Cornish Mainline and Branchlines (representing the Cornish Main Line and its associated branchlines just after the formation of British Railways in 1948)
- Platinum Edition - This includes everything in the Standard Edition plus unified camera and surveyor options, and an additional content bundle

==== Regional Editions ====
2019 saw the release of regional versions, with content (routes, locomotives, etc.) specific to certain parts of the world (and only those parts):

- World Edition - Containing all six routes and related content, this is a new name for the standard edition
- North American Edition - Only comes with Kickstarter County 2 and Golden, BC
- United Kingdom Edition - Only comes with Kickstarter County 2, Edinburgh-Dundee, and Cornish Mainline and Branchlines
- European Edition - Only comes with Kickstarter County 2, Niddertalbahn, and Sebino Lake, Italy

=== Trainz Simulator 3: Mobile ===
A port of Trainz Railroad Simulator 2019 for mobile devices was released around August 2021. The game currently comes with 4 routes, one of them being based on a fictional high-speed line in Sweden used by the ETR 1000, an Italian high-speed train. The line is most likely based on the Swedish SJ X2000 high-speed trainset used between Copenhagen and major cities in Sweden such as Stockholm, Malmö or Gothenburg. Another route involves the Rocky Mountains featuring the Rocky Mountaineer, and some CSX freighters. Despite the game not having a route based in China, there are Chinese trains available for purchase such as the SS4, an electric locomotive used for cargo operations Despite being able to place trains onto the map, the game does not contain a Surveyor mode.

=== Trainz Railroad Simulator 2022 ===
The next major release of Trainz was announced in November 2021, with preorders starting on 9 December. An Early Access edition was released on 11 February 2022 and the game was officially launched on 31 May 2022.

New features include Multiplayer Surveyor (tested in TRS2019 closed betas), the unification of Driver and Surveyor to allow seamless switching between the two, a total overhaul of the Surveyor called Surveyor 2.0, new effect layer tools and presets, the ability to bulk paint textures under splines, new camera options beyond the original four (including Walk, Car, Fly, and Drone), an in-game content store, and support for game controllers. Features exclusive to subscribers include HD Terrain, which adds 1600x more data density to manipulate and texture the terrain, and Trainz Living Railroad, a system that completely automates freight and passenger operations.

==== Full Editions ====
There are two editions offered:

- Standard Edition - The baseline version, which includes six routes: Kickstarter County 2, West from Denver (representing the Union Pacific mainline from Denver to Hot Sulphur Springs, Colorado), Schwäninger Land (a freelance route set in modern Germany), Liskeard to Looe (representing the Looe Valley Line in Cornwall from the Privatisation of British Rail to modern Great Western Railway operations), Bairnsdale to Orbost (representing the Gippsland railway line in the 1970s), and Beloreck - South Ural Mountains (representing the South Urals Railway)
- Platinum Edition - This includes everything in the Standard Edition plus Surveyor 2.0 and a content bundle including 5 routes previously released as DLC for earlier versions (including Canadian Rocky Mountains Ottertail to Castle Jct, Coal Country, and Potteries Loop Line), and over 400 new locomotives, cars, and wagons

==== Subscriptions ====
A different way of purchasing Trainz is by paying a monthly or annual subscription. This gives the player access to the game and extra perks as long as they remain a subscriber.

- Trainz Plus Standard - This facilitates access to the standard game, early access to new features and pre-release content, and accelerated downloads ("first class ticket")
- Trainz Plus Gold - In addition to the Standard tier, the player gets extra promotional features and gain free access to all DLC

=== Trainz Simulator: World Tour ===
In December 2024, N3V announced a console port of Trainz for a 2025 release. The trailer received backlash for usage of AI in marketing and was later reworked and reuploaded. On 23 October 2025, Trainz Simulator: World Tour was released to Xbox. Considering the limitations of a console compared to a PC, TS:WT removed Surveyor, making Driver the only available option for players to use. The official Trainz roadmap states that the game will also be ported to PlayStation 5 and PC.

=== Trainz Railroad Simulator 2027 ===
On June 23, 2026, the official Trainz roadmap revealed that the next major release of Trainz was in development.

=== Technical support ===
All games of the Trainz series have a support schedule which is described on the official wiki page. According to the document, game support includes following features:

- Product-specific information, downloads, and utilities on the N3V Games web site.
- Product assistance through the N3V Games Helpdesk.
- Maintenance of product-specific forums.
- Access to the Download Station.
- Access to upload content to the Download Station
- Access to the iTrainz network.
- Access to other product-specific network services.

==== Versioning of game engine and assets ====
The Trainz game series has a complicated versioning scheme for game engine and assets. Game builds are listed on a special wiki page and game engine versions are listed separately. All the assets created in an editor store a version number of the game engine used to create them. In many cases assets created in earlier versions of game have compatibility with game engine of newer versions.

==== Official Wiki website ====
The Trainz game series has its own official wiki website. Despite the old domain name, this site is an official wiki website of the whole Trainz project. This wiki is created by both N3VGames (the developers behind Trainz) and by the Trainz Community (requires a Planet Auran login and registered Trainz product to gain edit rights).

== Reception ==
Reception

Aggregate score
Aggregator	Score
Metacritic	(Trainz) 79/100 (TRS 2004) 76/100 (TRS 2006) 65/100

Review scores
Publication	Score
Computer Gaming World	(Trainz) 3.5/5 (TRS 2004) 3.5/5
GameSpot	(Trainz) 8.7/10 (TRS 2004) 7.9/10
GameSpy	(Trainz) 83/100 (TRS 2004) 75/100
IGN	(Trainz) 8/10
PC Gamer	(Trainz) 71% (TRS 2004) 66% (TRS 2006) 61%
PC Zone	(TRS 2006) 5.2/10

Trainz was a runner-up for GameSpot's annual "Best Simulation on PC" award in 2002.

Trainz Railroad Simulator 2004 was nominated for the Academy of Interactive Arts & Sciences' "Computer Simulation Game of the Year" award in 2004.

== See also ==
- Rolling Line
