= Odakyu 2000 series =

Electric multiple unit of Odakyu Electric Railway

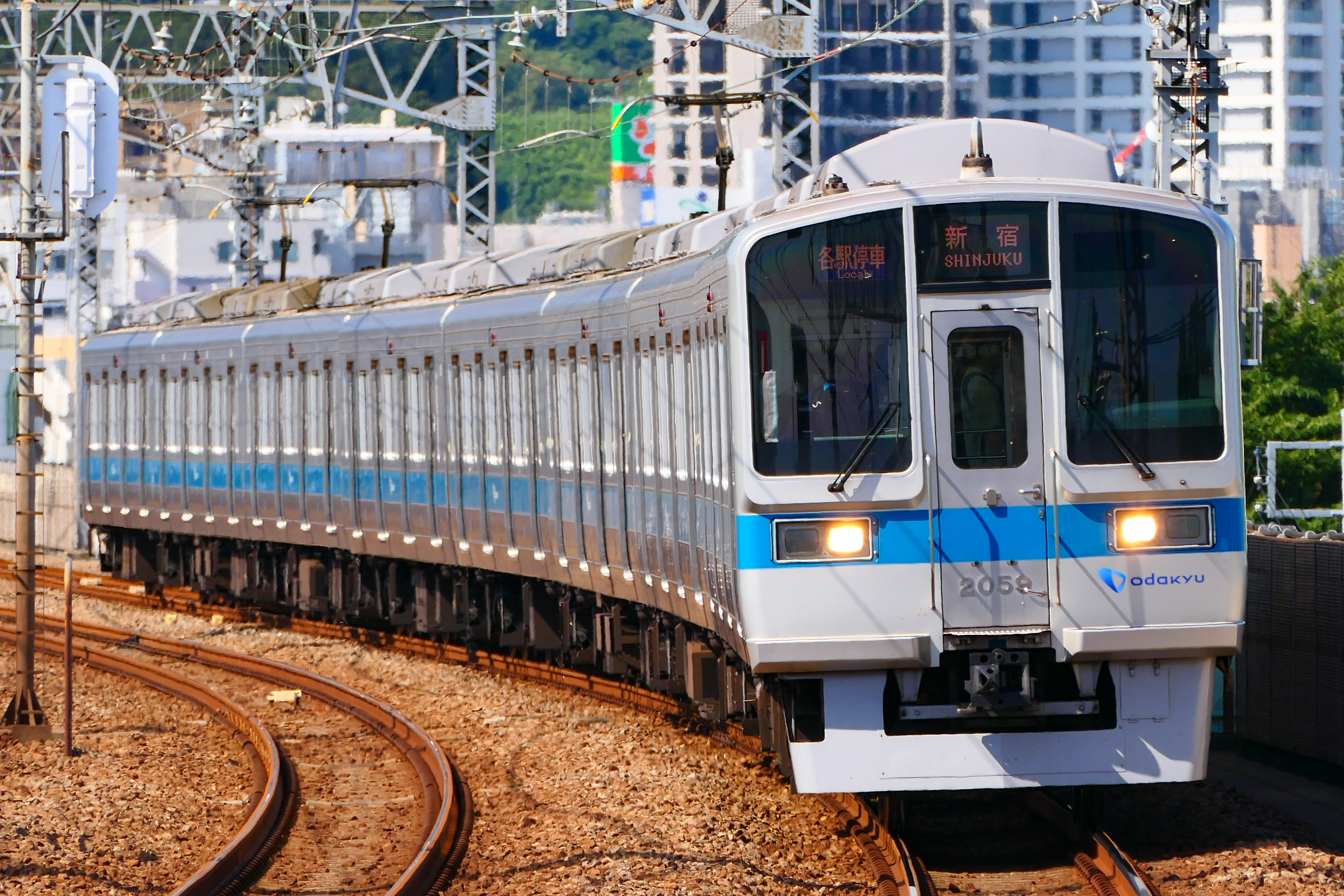
- Set 2059 in July 2023
- In service: March 1995 – present
- Manufacturers: Nippon Sharyo; Kawasaki Heavy Industries; Tokyu Car Corporation
- Constructed: 1994–2001
- Number built: 72 vehicles (9 sets)
- Number in service: 72 vehicles (9 sets)
- Formation: 8 cars per trainset
- Fleet numbers: 2051–2059
- Capacity: 1,240 (146 per end car, 158 per intermediate car)
- Operator: Odakyu
- Depot: Ebina
- Lines served: Odawara Line; Tama Line

Specifications
- Car body construction: Stainless steel
- Car length: 20,150 mm (66 ft 1 in) (end cars); 20,000 mm (65 ft 7 in) (intermediate cars)
- Width: 2,860 mm (9 ft 5 in)
- Height: 4,060 mm (13 ft 4 in); 4,145 mm (13 ft 7.2 in) (with pantograph)
- Doors: 4 pairs per side
- Maximum speed: 100 km/h (62 mph) (service); 120 km/h (75 mph) (design)
- Weight: 256.6 t (252.5 long tons; 282.9 short tons)
- Traction system: Mitsubishi 3-level VVVF (IGBT switching device)
- Traction motors: Mitsubishi 3-phase squirrel-cage induction motor
- Power output: 2,800 kW (175 kW x16)
- Acceleration: 3.3 km/(h⋅s) (2.1 mph/s)
- Deceleration: 4.0 km/(h⋅s) (2.5 mph/s) (service); 4.7 km/(h⋅s) (2.9 mph/s) (emergency)
- Electric systems: 1,500 V DC (overhead line)
- Current collection: Pantograph
- Bogies: Sumitomo Metal Industries; SS143 (motored car); SS043 (trailer car)
- Braking system: Electronically controlled pneumatic brakes with regenerative braking
- Safety systems: OM-ATS, D-ATS-P
- Coupling system: Shibata coupler
- Track gauge: 1,067 mm (3 ft 6 in)

The Odakyu 2000 series (小田急2000形, Odakyū 2000-gata) is a commuter electric multiple unit (EMU) train operated by the private railway operator Odakyu Electric Railway in the Tokyo area of Japan since March 1995.

Nine 8-car sets in total were manufactured between 1995 and 2001 in three batches. The design was based on the earlier 1000 series sets, with most of the passenger doors widened from 1,300 to 1,600 mm (51 to 63 in) to help reduce station dwell times.

== Formation ==
As of 1 April 2015, the fleet consisted of nine 8-car sets, 2051 to 2059, formed as follows with four motored (M) cars and four unpowered trailer (T) cars. Car 8 is at the Shinjuku end.

Car No.	1	2	3	4	5	6	7	8
Designation	Tc2	M5	M4	T2	T1	M2	M1	Tc1
Numbering	2450	2400	2300	2250	2150	2100	2000	2050

- Cars 2, 3, and 6, are each equipped with one single-arm pantograph.
- The door closest to the driver's cab of both lead cars is (1,300 mm (51 in)) wide, while the rest are (1,600 mm (63 in)) wide.
- The end cars, 1 and 8, have a wheelchair space.
- Car 2 is designated as a mildly-air-conditioned car.

== History ==
The trains were delivered between January 1995 and April 2001, with the first trains entering revenue service on 8 March 1995. These sets are only used for Local services.

In 2009, set 2052 received full-colour LED destination displays.

Set 2051 received an altered blue waistline stripe in 2012. As of October 2024, the revised colour scheme has been applied to the entire 2000 series fleet except for set 2059.

== Build details ==
The build histories for the fleet are as follows.

Batch	Set No.	Delivery date
1	2051	January 1995
1	2052	March 1995
2	2053	June 1998
3	2054	October 2000 – April 2001
3	2055	October 2000 – April 2001
3	2056	October 2000 – April 2001
3	2057	October 2000 – April 2001
3	2058	October 2000 – April 2001
3	2059	October 2000 – April 2001

== In popular culture ==
The Odakyu 2000 series is featured as a player-driveable train in the Microsoft Train Simulator computer game.
