= Fury (video game) =

2007 video game

- Developer: Auran
- Publisher: Gamecock Media Group
- Designer: Auran
- Composer: Pedro Camacho
- Engine: Unreal Engine 3 Foliage: SpeedTree
- Platform: Windows
- Release: October 16, 2007
- Genre: MMORPG
- Mode: Multiplayer

Fury was a player versus player (PvP) competitive online role-playing game and massively multiplayer online role-playing game (MMORPG) developed by Auran. The game was published by Gamecock Media Group on October 16, 2007, and was the first game they published. Less than two months later, the developer announced it had laid off all employees. The game switched to a free-to-play model, but in October 2008 Auran shutdown the game servers meaning the game would no longer be playable.

== Gameplay ==
Fury's focus on PvP combat differentiated it from traditional RPGs that center around player versus environment (PvE) content against non-player characters. However, like most RPGs, Fury used collectible equipment, skills, and a ranking mechanism for players. Fury used a method of matching equally ranked players from across the world in PvP matches.

Fury further differentiated itself from traditional RPGs by making many of its spells and abilities activate instantly and lacking a cooldown period. The pace of gameplay thus tended to be faster than PvP combat in traditional RPGs. For example, spell-casters in Fury were sometimes not frozen in place when casting a spell, which allowed them to retreat and avoid obstacles that might otherwise have locked them in.

== Development ==
The game was initially well received in beta testing and during a pre-release event known as the Fury Challenge; however, many aspects of the game were changed before the public release.

At the beginning of 2008, a large change was made to the game mechanics and the business plan of Fury. This made the game completely free to play, with the option of upgrading to the two previous payment options: retail price (a one-time fee), and Immortal (monthly payments). Additionally, all players prior to this large patch were given Immortal status free for life.

A new business plan was drafted late in the game's life which attempted to save the game. This plan included a match limit for free players and the possibility for skilled players to turn their skill into cash; however, the servers shut down before this plan was ever implemented.

== Reception ==
Reception

Aggregate scores
Aggregator	Score
GameRankings	53.65%
Metacritic	55/100

Review scores
Publication	Score
Eurogamer	3/10
Game Informer	5/10
GameSpot	4.5/10
GameSpy	2.5/5
GamesRadar+	3.5/5
GameZone	4.6/10
IGN	6.5/10

Fury received below average reviews from major gaming websites, having a score of 53.65% on GameRankings and a score of 55/100 on Metacritic.

GameSpot gave the game 4.5 out of 10, highlighting its poorly optimized engine, and its clumsy and chaotic gameplay. IGN gave a 6.5 out of 10, however ultimately criticized similar concepts, such as excessive numbers of useless skills, too many NPCs and minimal longevity.
