= TSS =

TSS may refer to:

== Organizations ==
- Tanglin Secondary School, a government secondary school in Clementi, Singapore
- The Southport School, Anglican day and boarding school on Gold Coast, Queensland, Australia
- Tinana State School, a public primary school in Maryborough, Queensland, Australia
- Thornhill Secondary School, in Canada
- Tideway Scullers School, a rowing club in London, England
- Telangana Sports School, a sports school in Hyderabad, India
- Times Square Stores, a US retail department store chain
- Technical Services Staff, a component of the U.S. Central Intelligence Agency
- Television Shin-Hiroshima, a TV station in Japan
- Total System Services, Inc. (NYSE symbol)
- Ton Steine Scherben, a German rock band

== Retail ==
- Times Square Stores, a defunct American department store also branded as "TSS"

== Science and technology ==
- Tiangong Space Station, a permanently crewed space station constructed by China.
- Traffic Separation Scheme, a traffic-management route-system ruled by the International Maritime Organization
- TSS-1, Tethered Satellite System-1, a 1990s joint space experiment program between Italy and USA flying a space tether
- TSS-1R, reflight of the Tethered Satellite System mission
- Tromsø Satellite Station, a satellite earth station located in Tromsø, Norway
- Toxic shock syndrome, a potentially fatal illness caused by a bacterial toxin
- Transcription start site, the starting point of the process of creating a complementary RNA copy of a sequence of DNA
- Time Sharing System, an early time-sharing operating system on the IBM System/360 Model 67 and System/370
- Task State Segment, a special structure on x86-based computers which holds information about a task
- Total sum of squares, a quantity that appears as part of a standard way of presenting results
- Total suspended solids, a water quality measurement
- TATSU Signing Server, an Apple server which controls whether iOS versions can be restored or updated on a device
- Trusted Platform Module (TCG Software Stack), a software stack by TCG that allows interaction with a TPM
- Texas Supernova Search, a program to search for new supernovae and other astronomical transients
- Toyota Safety Sense, a collision avoidance system by Toyota
- Thyristor Surge Suppressor, another name for a Thyristor Surge Protection Device (TSPD)

== Transport ==
- Tsing Shan Tsuen stop, Hong Kong (MTR station code TSS)
- Trans Semanggi Suroboyo in Surabaya, Indonesia
- Twin-screw steamer, a steam-powered vessel with two screw propellers
