= Microsoft Train Simulator 2 =

Cancelled video game

Microsoft Train Simulator 2 (abbreviated as MSTS 2) was a train simulation game in development by Microsoft Game Studios on two occasions. Meant to be the successor to Microsoft Train Simulator, it was originally announced in 2003, until being cancelled in 2004. The second attempt at the game was first announced on January 19, 2007, and originally scheduled for release in the last quarter of 2009. It was postponed indefinitely and virtually cancelled due to the closure of Aces Game Studio in 2009.

The second project's lead designer, Rick Selby, announced in late 2008 that it was to be compatible with Windows XP, Windows Vista and Windows 7. It was being developed by Aces Game Studio (Microsoft Game Studios), known for their long line of Microsoft Flight Simulator games, as a part of the "Games for Windows" initiative. The simulation was to use a modified version of the Flight Simulator X software platform. However, with the closure of Microsoft's Aces Game Studio on January 23, 2009, development of this simulator was immediately halted.

== 2003–2004: First attempt ==
Microsoft Train Simulator 2
- Developer(s): Kuju Entertainment
- Publisher(s): Microsoft Game Studios
- Series: Microsoft Train Simulator
- Platform(s): Windows
- Release: Cancelled
- Genre(s): Vehicle simulation
- Mode(s): Single Player

An earlier attempt at building a successor to Microsoft Train Simulator was originally announced during the spring of 2003. Many improvements were attempted to make with procedural switches and walking passengers and was again going to be developed by Kuju Entertainment, who were the original creators. On May 15, 2003, a preview of the title was shown at the E3 Entertainment Expo in Los Angeles to demonstrate much of the new work, such as its new routes, rolling stock, and other features including animated people and functioning turntables.

However, only three months later into the summer on August 18, 2003, Kuju had handed the project over to Microsoft Game Studios and they would eventually halt the entire development by spring of 2004 as the following statement from Microsoft confirmed:

April 24, 2004 – Microsoft Game Studios has halted the Windows-based game "Train Simulator 2.0." The decision to halt "Train Simulator 2.0" was made some time ago and was based on a long, hard and difficult look at our business objectives and product offerings. We remain focused on the simulations category with successful, platform-driving franchises such as "Microsoft Flight Simulator."

Much of the former development team from Kuju later announced Rail Simulator in order to continue development of their own simulation platform. Its first version was published by Electronic Arts in October 2007. Its successor, RailWorks, developed by Rail Simulator Developments (today known as Dovetail Games), was released in June 2009, then RailWorks 2: Train Simulator in October 2010. Since 2012, the series has been known as simply Train Simulator.

== 2007–2009: Second attempt ==
Microsoft Train Simulator 2
- Developer(s): Aces Game Studio
- Publisher(s): Microsoft Game Studios
- Designer(s): Rick Selby
- Series: Microsoft Train Simulator
- Platform(s): PC – Windows XP, Windows Vista, Windows Server 2008; Windows 7
- Release: Cancelled
- Genre(s): Vehicle simulation
- Mode(s): Single Player

The re-launch attempt at Microsoft's second version of the "Train Simulator" project was officially announced on January 19, 2007. This time around the simulation was instead being made in-house by Microsoft's Aces Game Studio, which was most known for its successful Microsoft Flight Simulator series line, as a part of the "Games for Windows" initiative.

=== Development ===
The simulation leveraged most of the existing core components of Microsoft Flight Simulator X's platform, thus providing an entire earth model in which to play from, and was planned to be compatible with both Windows Vista and Windows XP. A post on 'The Little Wheel Goes in Back' blog, written by one of the developers, confirmed the working title was 'Train Simulator 2'.

Microsoft's first demonstration of Train Simulator 2 occurred on August 25, 2007 at the Games Convention in Leipzig, Germany and released an official press kit which included several in-game visual prototype images, asset renders, and two videos. One of these videos presents a brief demonstration of the simulation's ability to model the entire planet's track corridors, reproducing a similar concept in Microsoft's Flight Simulator series, with global rail network data for anyone to operate their trains around freely without limits. The data would have also been available to route builders for modification of any kind to suit their modeling needs anywhere in the world. As opposed to starting an entire route from scratch, this would require more or less simple cosmetic details and object placement.

Despite having the name in common with its predecessor, backwards compatibility with the first version of Train Simulator would not have been possible due to the completely different base platform used for development and programming designs between the two versions. The original Microsoft Train Simulator uses routes based on individual levels which are loaded separately within the application, whereas this version would have introduced the entire world as a single game playing area where railroad corridors would have been based on their actual real-world locations just as in Flight Simulator.

=== Routes ===
In addition to the entire global earth model from which Flight Simulator X was based, Train Simulator 2 was also going to feature four high-detail routes, including the following lines, along with their respective railroad carriers:

| Route name | Featured trains | Rolling stock | Terminal stations | km | miles | Set in | Country | Notes |
|---|---|---|---|---|---|---|---|---|
| Horseshoe Curve | Norfolk Southern | Dash 9-40CW; SD40-2 High Nose | Norfolk Southern's "Pittsburgh Line" from Altoona to Johnstown, Pennsylvania. | — | — | 2000s | (United States) | — |
| Stevens Pass | BNSF | Dash 9-44CW; GP38-2; SD40-2 | BNSF Railway's "Scenic Subdivision" from Everett to Wenatchee, Washington. | — | — | 2000s | (United States) | — |
| BLS Lötschbergbahn | SBB | Re460 | BLS's "Lötschberg Line" from Thun to Interlaken and Brig, Switzerland. | — | — | 2000s | (Switzerland) | — |
| Cologne–Düsseldorf | DB | ICE 3 | Deutsche Bahn's "ICE" route from Cologne to Duisburg, Germany. | — | — | 2000s | (Germany) | — |

=== Locomotives ===
The second attempt contained unknown drivable locomotives and multiple units; unknown if MSTS 2 would have featured AI-only trains, or a static in-game number.

| Locomotive | Image | Ingame number | Type | mph | km/h | Built | Country | Route | Livery(s) | Notes |
|---|---|---|---|---|---|---|---|---|---|---|
| Dash 9-40CW | | 9039; 9713 | Diesel | 70 | 112 | 1993 | (United States) | Horseshoe Curve | Norfolk Southern | — |
| Dash 9-44CW | | 4897 | Diesel | 70 | 112 | 1993 | (United States) | Stevens Pass | BNSF | — |
| GP38-2 | | 2264 | Diesel | 70 | 112 | 1972 | (United States) | Stevens Pass | BNSF | — |
| SD40-2 | | 7184 | Diesel | 70 | 112 | 1972 | (United States) | Stevens Pass | BNSF | — |
| SD40-2 High Nose | | 5095 | Diesel | 70 | 112 | 1972 | (United States) | Horseshoe Curve | Norfolk Southern | — |
| Re 460 | | 014 | Electric | 120 | 200 | 1991 | (Switzerland) | BLS Lötschbergbahn | SBB Dark Blue | — |
| ICE 3 | | — | Electric | 200 | 320 | 2000 | (Germany) | Cologne–Duisburg | DB | — |

=== Closure of the Aces Game Studio ===
On January 23, 2009, Microsoft announced that it was permanently closing its Aces Game Studio, the internal development studio responsible for the Microsoft Flight Simulator series and the development of Microsoft Train Simulator 2. As a result, all future development on Train Simulator 2 (which was just entering the final stages of development at the time of closure) was immediately halted, marking the second time that this project was terminated. A week later, Microsoft issued the following official announcement from Train Simulator Insider.

January 30, 2009 – By now, many of you have heard that Microsoft has closed Aces Studio, the publisher of Microsoft Flight Simulator and Microsoft Train Simulator. This was not a reflection of the quality of the products Aces has developed, the sales performance of the games, or the quality of the team at Aces. This difficult decision was made to align Microsoft’s resources with our strategic priorities. As a result of this difficult decision, development of the next version of Train Simulator is being postponed for an indefinite period.

Microsoft Game Studios is investing significant resources in many exciting and new areas of gaming and entertainment, including Windows games. We believe these future investments will push innovation, community, and collaboration to unprecedented levels and will provide more synergy with our ongoing investments in Games for Windows - LIVE as well as other Windows entertainment technologies.

We are humbled and proud of the passion and support that the Train Simulator franchise has developed. This includes you, the large community of railroading simmers, as well as the vibrant third-party ecosystem that has developed around the game. Thank you for your understanding of our decision and for your continued support.

Information regarding the product can be found on Microsoft's official Train Simulator website, through the Internet Archive's Wayback Machine.

On October 12, 2009, former Aces Game Studio directors, Rick Selby and Kathie Flood, announced the launch of a new simulations-based development studio named Cascade Game Foundry. Their first independent release was a scuba diving simulation game titled Infinite Scuba, released in 2013.

== See also ==
- Rail Simulator – Related product developed by Kuju Entertainment responsible for Microsoft Train Simulator
- List of Games for Windows titles
