= SimSig =

- Developer: Geoff Mayo
- Platforms: Windows; Linux using WINE
- Genre: Train simulation
- Modes: Single-player, multiplayer

SimSig is a mixed donationware and commercial Windows-based train simulator of modern railway signalling systems in Great Britain, from the point of view of a railway signaller. Users have also had success running SimSig on Linux using Wine.

The program was written in Delphi 6, a dialect of Object Pascal, by Geoff Mayo and has been in development since the late 1990s. Visually, it resembles the British Rail Integrated Electronic Control Centre (IECC), though most of the simulations do not cover areas operated by IECC-based signal boxes. It simulates overlaps, approach locking, time-of-operation point locking, shunt routes, warner routes, call-on routes, and more.

Railtrack asked for a "professional" version of SimSig, now known as TREsim, which is currently used to train signallers at every Network Rail IECC and several panel signal boxes around Great Britain.

== Gameplay ==
Train motion is simulated according to train type and loading, and is controlled via the use of timetables. With a keyboard and mouse, the player sets routes and operates level crossings as necessary as well as simulations/timetable specific tasks such as operating ground frames. Solid State Interlockings (SSIs), the main electronic technology in use at present on British railways, along with approach locking, swinging overlaps, shunt routes, warner routes and call-on routes are all available. The simulations may be played in real time or sped up. The aim of play is to achieve a good score by overcoming problems and ensuring on-time train running. Points are accumulated for good operation and deducted for errors or late running.

Sounds can be enabled for phone messages, warnings, failures, and Train Ready To Start indicators. Automatic Route Setting, Automatic Headcode Insertion and token systems for single line working are functional in some of the available simulations. Most simulations have various levels of difficulty, ranging from beginner to difficult scenarios with engineering possessions of tracks; train delays; bad weather; or points, signal and track circuit failures.

Although produced by railway software engineers to ensure a high degree of realism, the simulations are usable by those without any in-depth or professional knowledge of signalling systems. Most simulations can be joined over the Internet to share the workload. Some simulations can be linked to form a chain of signal boxes for extended operation.

A total of 40 simulations are currently available covering England, Wales and Scotland. Beta versions are no longer publicly available.

Screenshot of the Exeter version of Simsig

Many of the older simulations are based on the real life IECC screen layout with multiple pages or panels to display different parts of the simulation whereas the newer simulations have one scrollable panel which covers the entire simulation.

As of July 2013, a new method of installing, running and updating compatible simulations, the SimSig Loader, was introduced.

The SimSig loader allows for the opening and updating of most recent simulations via a single program as opposed to the individual .exe files of previous simulations. In September 2018, support for using operating systems prior to Windows 7 to find updates was discontinued. This includes both the loader and licence manager.

=== User content ===
User-created timetables simulating modern, historical, and fictional scenarios are available through simulation forums and other web sites. Timetables may be created with the built-in editor or an imported text file. Sources for timetabling information include official Working Timetables (WTT) and historic published timetables such as Bradshaws.

A timetable file converter allowing easy conversion between timetables and text files is available from a third-party site.

== Reception ==
SimSig is referenced in the 2nd edition of Railway Operation and Control by Professor Jörn Pachl of University of Braunschweig - Institute of Technology. Doctor Marcelo Moretti Fioroni of the University of São Paulo, in a paper on rail simulations and their applications in Brazil, cited SimSig as an extremely realistic simulation, reproducing real scenarios.

The Rail Safety and Standards Board recommends the use of simulation software as a classroom aid and specifically mentions the SimSig website as a source:

Load and run rail (train and signal) simulation software and obtain an appreciation of the role of drivers and signallers in the rail system. Rail signalling simulation software may be downloaded from

www.simsig.co.uk

SimSig has been described by Alan Marshall of the North London Society of Model Engineers as "a remarkable and complex simulator that will test your skills and it demands quite a bit of patience to learn how to operate a modern signal box successfully.".

In 2009 the National Model Railroad Association convention at Fort Wayne hosted workshops demonstrating the use of SimSig for model rail simulations.

The information in the Edinburgh simulation has been referenced by the Rail Action Group, East of Scotland (RAGES) in discussion with the railway authorities and has been noted in their published newsletters.
