= Times Square Stores =

American department store chain

- Industry: Department store
- Founded: 1929
- Defunct: 1989
- Fate: Bankrupt
- Key people: George J. Seedman (founder), Julius Kasinitz, (Chairman and CEO)
- Number of employees: 2,875

Times Square Stores (also called TSS and TSS Seedman's) was an American department store chain based in New York City that operated from 1929 to 1989. By the late 1980s the chain operated 12 stores in New York and 6 in Puerto Rico, and an off-price ladies' apparel chain, Finders Keepers, which had 15 locations. The New York department stores ranged in size from 160,000 to 220,000 square feet (20,000 m^{2}). During its prime it was considered Long Island's most prominent discount department store chain.

The chain was founded in 1929 by George Seedman. In 1983 the company explored an initial public offering on the American Stock Exchange, but backed out in 1984 after learning investors would only pay about 66% of the company's desired price.

George Seedman continued to own and run the chain until 1987, when, at the age of 90, he began looking for buyers. Price Club (later renamed Costco) announced plans to buy an 81% stake in the company for $50 million (~$118 million in 2024) in 1987. After Seedman learned of plans to convert the TSS stores to warehouse clubs, the sale did not go through, and TSS was sold to the Pritzker family of Chicago later in 1987 for the same price.

Although it was a discount chain, by the 1980s its main markets were Nassau and Suffolk Counties, two of the richest in America at the time. Nine of their twelve modern-sized stores were on Long Island, two in Brooklyn on Linden Blvd and Fourth Avenue, in Queens on Farmers Blvd, and in the Metro Mall on Metropolitan Ave, and another in The Bronx. The chain began to struggle in the late 1980s and took drastic cost-cutting measures: downsizing stores and eliminating leased departments in a mistaken belief that the company could operate those departments more efficiently itself. In the early 1980s the chain attempted to stake a claim in Northern New Jersey when it leased 2 vacant, former Two Guys locations. The plan was to gauge reaction to these two large stores (150,000 sq/ft each), and then plan further expansion into New Jersey. Neither location lived up to expectations, and the two stores were first downsized to one level each and then shuttered.

On December 4, 1989, the chain, which had about 2,875 employees by then, filed for bankruptcy and announced it would close its doors on December 31, 1989. Three stores remained open for liquidation until June 1990.
