= Rolling Line =

2018 video game

- Promotional cover art
- Developer: Gaugepunk Games
- Publisher: Gaugepunk Games
- Engine: Unity
- Platform: Microsoft Windows
- Release: 28 April 2018
- Genres: Indie, casual, simulation, multiplayer
- Modes: Single-player, Multi-player

Rolling Line is an independent PC and VR sandbox game developed and published by New Zealand game developer Gaugepunk Games. The game simulates railway modelling with a low-poly aesthetic in which players can explore and create model-train layouts and share them online for others to play. The game had a delayed release of 28 April 2018 for Microsoft Windows initially with HTC Vive support. It now supports almost most VR headsets including Oculus, Vive, Valve Index and WMR headsets.

== Gameplay ==
Rolling Line is a 3D sandbox game which is centred on the creation and operation of model railway sets. The game utilises a minimalist low-poly aesthetic commonly used in independent games. It is played from the first-person perspective and can be played in either VR or on PC. The player can either play on the official built-in layouts, based on real-world inspired locations around New Zealand, or create their own in an empty workroom environment.

The game can be played at two scales, one "large" mode where the player is at the typical size of a human viewing a layout, and a "small" mode where the player can experience the layout from a small point of view as if they were a part of the layout itself. The player can move with W, A, S, and D keys (or reassign them in the settings menu). The player can also interact with trains, entering them by pressing tab and controlling them via simple control buttons, which include forward, reverse, headlight, cab light, and horn.

=== Driving ===
The table-top model railways can be operated in the rooms by pointing the hand-held remote controller and selecting a locomotive which will display the speed and the name of the locomotive. Alternatively, the player can drive the selected locomotives from within the cab by switching from the human-sized scale to the model-sized scale and view the layout from the perspective of the driver. While in the miniature scale, dynamic time and weather will be enabled and the environment and skybox extends beyond the shape of the railway. In the room-scale, more rollingstock types can be found within the drawers underneath the tables which can be added onto the layouts to create custom consists. The player can also upload mods to the Steam Workshop and download existing mods. Mods include Props, Layouts, Train Mods, Terrain, Liveries, etc. Train Mods are fully custom trains with custom meshes, textures and more. The player can also put custom liveries on the vanilla trains, these are liveries. The player can also upload liveries of Train Mods, these are called Train Mod Liveries.

=== Building ===
Within the rooms drawers can be found underneath the tables which contain categories for all the props and track pieces used for creating and decorating layouts. The player can add these props onto the tabletop. The layouts can be edited by pointing the edit tool onto the table-top and selecting “enable editing” which can be scrolled out to a certain radius. This will enable props to be picked up, moved, scaled and painted.

=== Multiplayer ===
Multiplayer functionality was introduced in Rolling Line with the release of version 5.37 on 8th of November 2025, followed by the server browser update in version 5.38 on 12th of November 2025. This highly anticipated feature, long requested by the community since the game's early access launch, enables players to host and join public servers. Multiplayer in Rolling Line offers a shared sandbox environment where players can:

- Drive trains in both cab view and large-scale mode using controllers.
- Operate signals, turnouts (switches), turntables, and other interactive map elements.
- Engage with circuitry and automation systems.
- Use modded trains and tracks, provided all joining players have the same mods installed.
- Communicate via text chat (opened with the T key) and voice chat (push-to-talk with the V key).
- Express themselves using customizable player avatars and gesture animations (accessed with the G key).
- Highlight points of interest using the ping system (Z key), visible to all players.
- Utilise server administration tools, including muting, kicking, and banning players.

Both Steam Workshop maps and local save files are supported, along with prop and track modifications, provided all joining players have downloaded the necessary content.

== History ==
Rolling Line was developed and released by independent developer and publisher Gaugepunk Games, who is solely owned by Jack Huygens, a New Zealand VR game developer currently based in Wellington.

Before working on Rolling Line, Jack Huygens would work on virtual reality game prototypes back in 2014. His first published project, Tsar Roska would be a 3D top-down tank shooter built in the Unity engine using low poly models in a minimalist environment, an aesthetic which would continue throughout Gaugepunk Games including Rolling Line.

Huygens has now developed three commercial games published to Steam being Frontier VR (a wild west nature experience), Echo Grotto (a NZ based cave exploring game) and his most popular title, Rolling Line.
