= Train Dispatcher (computer simulation) =

Train simulator for Centralized Traffic Control systems

Train Dispatcher is a train simulator of centralized traffic control (CTC) systems. It was originally developed in the 1980s as a training tool for a commercial railroad and was then made available to the public. The software is currently produced by SoftRail (formerly Signal Computer Consultants) for Windows-based computers.

The simulator is operated from the perspective of a CTC dispatcher. Track diagrams similar to actual CTC displays are provided, and train operations run according to a timetable. Operations can be run in real time or adjusted fast or slow.

Version 2 of the software was released in 1997 and supported multiple track territories. The manufacturer provided five territory files in the initial package, and offered additional territories for sale on its website. It also provided companion software called "Track Builder" which allows users to create and share files for additional railroad territories. Users have created territory files for many locations, including North America, Australia and Europe, and some of these files are available for free downloading on the company's website. The version 2 software is available as a free download from the manufacturer.

The current version of the software is 3.5, and is provided with five US territories, and one each for Canada and Australia. Additional for-sale and free territory files are available.

In April 2012, Softrail announced that it would discontinue Train Dispatcher 3 as of April 30, 2012.
