= Service pack =

Single installable package of software updates

Windows XP SP2 installation disc.

In computing, a service pack comprises a collection of updates, fixes, or enhancements to a software program delivered in the form of a single installable package. Companies often release a service pack when the number of individual patches to a given program reaches a certain (arbitrary) limit, or the software release has shown to be stabilized with a limited number of remaining issues based on users' feedback and bug reports. In large software applications such as office suites, operating systems, database software, or network management, it is not uncommon to have a service pack issued within the first year or two of a product's release. Installing a service pack is easier and less error-prone than installing many individual patches, even more so when updating multiple computers over a network, where service packs are common.

Service packs are usually numbered, and thus shortly referred to as SP1, SP2, SP3 etc. They may also bring, besides bug fixes, entirely new features, as is the case of SP2 of Windows XP (e.g. Windows Security Center), or SP3 and SP4 of the heavily database dependent Trainz 2009: World Builder Edition.

== Incremental and cumulative SPs ==
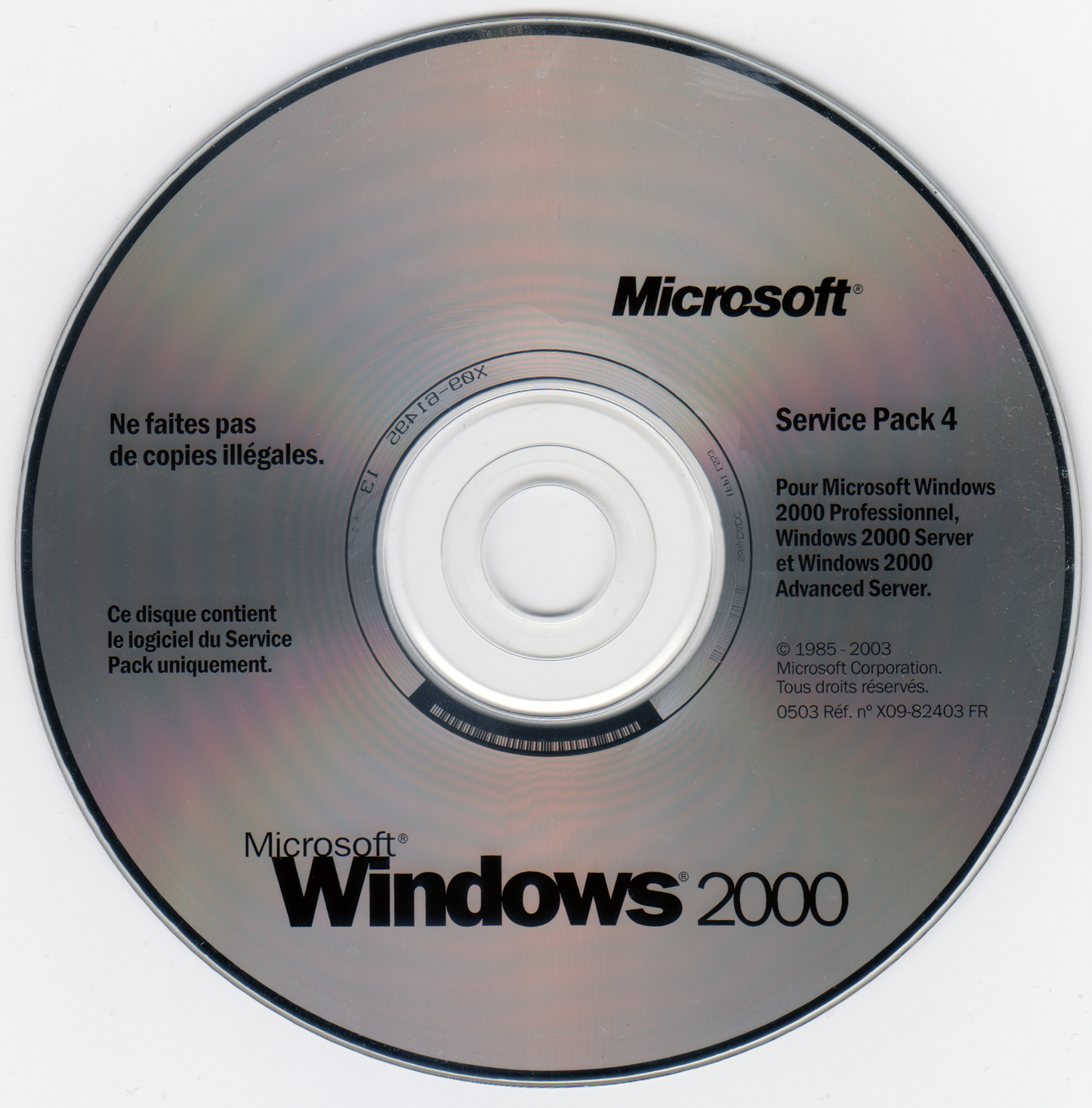
Windows 2000 SP4 installation disc

Service Packs for Microsoft Windows were cumulative through Windows XP. This means that the problems that are fixed in a service pack are also fixed in later service packs. For example, Windows XP SP3 contains all the fixes that are included in Windows XP Service Pack 2 (SP2). Windows Vista SP2 was not cumulative, however, but incremental, requiring that SP1 be installed first.

Office XP, Office 2003, Office 2007, Office 2010 and Office 2013 service packs have been cumulative.

Since Windows 8, the Service Pack concept of Microsoft Windows has been eliminated, instead the Feature Update concept is used.

== Impact on installation of additional software components ==
Application service packs replace existing files with updated versions that typically fix bugs or close security holes. If, at a later time, additional components are added to the software using the original media, there is a risk of accidentally mixing older and updated components. Depending on the operating system and deployment methods, it may then be necessary to manually reinstall the service pack after each such change to the software. This was, for example, necessary for Windows NT service packs; however, from Windows 2000 onwards, Microsoft redirected setup programs to use updated service pack files instead of files from the original installation media in order to prevent manual reinstall.

== See also ==
- Adaptation Kit Update
- Apple Software Update
- Hotfix
- IBM Program temporary fix
- Point release
- Slipstream (computing)
- Software release life cycle
- Windows Update
