= N3V Games =

Australian video game developer

N3V Games Pty Ltd.
- Formerly: Auran (1995–2005) (Note: The "Auran" name is still used as a legal entity, notably on their website. It also exists as a subsidiary of N3V Games, operating under the name "Auran Games".); N3vrf41l Publishing (2005–2011)
- Type: Proprietary limited company
- Industry: Video games
- Founded: 1995; 31 years ago in Brisbane, Queensland, Australia
- Founder: Auran: Greg Lane; Graham Edelsten; N3V: Graham Edelsten; Tony Hilliam
- Headquarters: Helensvale, Queensland, Australia
- Products: Dark Reign: The Future of War; Trainz; Fury
- Subsidiaries: Auran Games
- Website: n3vgames.com

N3V Games Pty Ltd. (formerly Auran and later N3vrf41l Publishing (Note: "N3vrf41l" is written in Leetspeek and means "Neverfail".)) is an Australian video game developer and publisher based in Helensvale, Queensland. Auran is now operated as a holding company, with operations and development ceded to N3V Games, a different closely held company.

== History ==
The logo of Auran, used since 1997

Auran was established by Greg Lane and Graham Edelsten in 1995, and released its first game, Dark Reign: The Future of War, in 1997. Dark Reign sold over 685,000 units and was rated in the top ten real-time strategy games by the US magazine Game Developer. The game received a 9.2 rating on GameSpot and was called "one of the most impressive games released this year in any genre."

By the mid-2000s, Tony Hilliam had established a video game company 'N3VrF41L Games' while occasionally participating on the Auran forums as a Trainz fan. When Auran overextended backing the wrong product in early 2007, Hilliam bought in, and initially brought out several republished or rebundled packaged releases as new product titles to boost cash flow (Trainz Routes, Trainz: The Complete Collection and eventually the regionally focused Trainz Classics and Europe-only releases.) Since 2007, the re-titled N3V Games has taken over primary day to day operation, development, and management of the Auran/N3V panoply of resources, websites, holdings, and software.

=== Auran JET ===
Success of Dark Reign spurred interest in the game engine from other games developers, and Auran began in-house development of a generalised version of the graphics engine for licensing to third-party companies based on its self-developed middleware game engine called the Auran JET and in 1998 began development of a more specialized version for what became the game engine for the Trainz series of train simulator products—beta tested with Trainz 0.9 in 2000 amongst railfans, and with a major new release about every 2½ years.

Auran grew steadily on the Trainz revenues and, in 2007, invested heavily and overextended its finances developing the Fury video game, a player versus player (PvP) based massively multiplayer online game which never recouped its costs. In the ensuing bankruptcy the company lost most of its development staff. Prior to that and the Trainz series of simulators, Auran had published a number of Auran Jet based games for the Australian market, including Shadowgrounds and Hearts of Iron II: Doomsday.

=== Key transitions ===
In late 2005, after overseeing the stabilization (four service packs released in one year) of the Trainz 2004 and Trainz 2006 retail releases, one of the company's founders, Greg Lane, left, saying publicly it was time to move on. Lane was responsible for the development of Dark Reign and Trainz as well as the early Auran Jet Graphics Engine of Trainz V1.x, Trainz Virtual Railway and the Ultimate Trainz Collection; the upgraded Jet technology (JET 2) of Trainz 2004 and Trainz 2006 and evolutionarily, is still at the heart of all Trainz releases through TS2009. This was overhauled as JET 3 in the TS2010 version and again improved with the last 32 bit release, Trainz 2012—which under the highly strained JET 3 version crossed the line into better utilization of 64 bit Graphics Card computer architectures and like the preceding N3V Games developed Trainz 2010, better utilizes modern multi-core CPU microprocessor units—though still a 32 bit core application.

N3V Games has the public position that TS2012 takes 32 bit architecture as far as it is possible, so in summer of 2013 began development of an entirely new 64 bit game engine called Trainz: A New Era (TANE or T:ANE) which originally slated for Christmas 2014 release, has an official release on 15 May 2015 after a lot of troubles during alpha and beta testing. TANE was kickstarter funded and the company released a partial version in December called T:ANE Community Edition (effectively a public partial Beta Test lacking many of the promised features and capabilities.)

=== Demise of Auran ===
The remaining Auran management embarked on an expensive software development and virtually ignored the continued development of Trainz except for a series of joint ventures based on the extremely stable Trainz 2006 software which had been released in late 2005. These joint ventures were mainly locally published and distributed regionally customized versions of TRS2006 such as Trains Deluxe in which the local publishers/distributors bundled additional software such as trains videos, video capture software, or a much more limited trains simulator Virtual Model Railway.

In 2007, the game Fury was the most expensive game yet produced in Australia, costing AU$8.3 million. However, the game did not sell well on its release.

On 13 December 2007, Auran Development, the company behind Fury, went into voluntary administration, having focused and spent heavily on development of the new game which flopped, squandering the ongoing cash flow from their Trainz franchise, despite the staggered releases of Trainz Classics, Trainz Classics 2 and 3 – all versions focused on regionally specific routes partnered with organizations that had offered the route and asset content as payware, added a demo driver-only version Trainz Driver as well as releases specifically aimed to grow the international clientele (Trainz 2007 and Trainz 2008, French and Eastern European languages releases). The majority of staff was laid off.

A new legal entity, Auran Games, emerged in the reorganization as the interim developer of the Trainz series, and continued to operate the Trainz business under the reorganization. During this period, the active Auran web board forums disappeared for over a month creating widespread user community anxieties, but was revitalized just short of five weeks later and the Trainz franchise continued under Auran Games with a development team of just three individuals working on the next major Trainz release with its many user-demanded improvements, Trainz 2009: World Builder edition.

=== New investors ===
Soon after the company emerged from bankruptcy, Tony Hilliam, a Trainz devotee, offered additional capital, and the next year Auran Games became a subsidiary of N3V Games (previously known as N3VRF41L), co-founded by Graham Edelsten and Tony Hilliam in 2005, and Edelsten was the remaining founder at Auran while Tony Hilliam, a long time railfan had participated in the Trains 0.9 beta testing in 2000, and was an active and well-known figure on the Auran web board forums, and user of the Trainz simulators. Hilliam injected much needed operating cash, rehired the sole available programmer from the Trainz beta team, Chris Bergmann as lead programmer, hired additional staff and began once again to develop and improve the Trainz franchise with a new team of developers continuing work on what became Trainz 2009: World Builder Edition.

=== New websites, new directions ===
On 24 October 2008, the new team including Hilliam began TrainzOnline, a wiki dedicated to Trainz technology; the new software featured a built-in web browser to assist Trainz users, in place of publishing separate PDF manuals for each release. This was in part an attempt to re-engage the formerly hyper-active Trainz user community assistance in tutorials for new users, but as of July 2013, the only user written tutorial content was on the advanced topics of content creation (3D modeling techniques). Tony Hilliam himself authored most of the scant new user tutorial pages.

==== MMORPG and Trainz interactive ====
On 6 October 2010, N3V and Frogster Pacific began operating a Brisbane-based server for the Runes of Magic MMORPG developed by Runewaker Entertainment. In 2011, Trainz 2010-SP3 was released incorporating a new interactive web play between multiple-users, a move to increased DRM spurred by software piracy, and with that service pack, the first version of Trainz where assets may not be convertible (back-fixed for) older versions. The release is the first fully exploiting modern graphics cards and multi-core microprocessor desktop computers, which has been further extended in the Trainz 2012 release (April 2011).

==== Simulator Central ====
By mid-2011, N3V had begun offering payware add-on assets for Trainz developed by its third-party partners, and released a number of smaller game style simple simulations. Late in 2012, it renamed its online store to Simulator Central and began marketing a whole catalogue of simulation software titles, ranging from farming and zoo management simulations, taxi driving-to-become a fleet operator, and warfare simulations including naval battles. In 2012, the site began offering Trainz on smartphones and tablets, both under the iMac OS and Android technologies. By July 2013, their web store categories list nearly 200 titles, mostly for download, for Windows, Mac and boxed set DVD platforms (sic).

== Games developed ==
- Dark Reign: The Future of War
- The Trainz series
- Airport Simulator
- Bridge It
- Fury
- Battlestar Galactica
- Harn: Bloodline

== Games published ==
- Chaser
- Elemental: War of Magic
- Kao the Kangaroo: Round 2
- Kao the Kangaroo: Mystery of the Volcano
- My First Trainz
- ParaWorld
- Psychotoxic
- Reload
- Remington Super Slam Hunting: Africa
- Remington Super Slam Hunting: North America
- SpellForce (Australian)
- Trainz 2009: World Builder Edition
- Trainz 2010: Engineers Edition
- Trainz 2012: 10th Anniversary Edition
- Turbo Trainz
