= BVE Trainsim =

BVE TrainSim
- Developer: Takashi Kojima (Mackoy)
- Platform: Windows
- Release: BVE TS 1: 1996; BVE TS 2: 2001; BVE TS 4: 2005; BVE TS 5: 2011; BVE TS 6: 2020
- Genre: Train simulator
- Modes: Single-player, multiplayer

BVE Trainsim (originally Boso View Express) is a Japanese three-dimensional computer-based train simulator. It is notable for focusing on providing an accurate driving experience as viewed from inside the cab, rather than creating a network of other trains —other trains passed along the route are only displayed as stationary objects. BVE Trainsim was designed and developed by Takashi "Mackoy" Kojima starting in 1996 with the original program name coming from the Japanese 255 series multiple unit trains found in routes in Japan.

Although the internal working of the BVE Trainsim program itself cannot be modified, additional routes and train cab views can be added via a number of text-based configuration files. Route builders have produced over 300 additional routes for the program, along with matching cab environments. Routes built by independent developers simulate rail activity in Africa, Asia, North America, South America, and Europe.

== BVE Trainsim 1 ==
BVE Trainsim 1 was released in 1996 as an Alpha version under the name Boso View Express and 1999 as a Beta Version. This version, the first version of BVE to be produced, had an interface that was similar to BVE Trainsim 2, but did not have a logo. Instead, the official symbol of BVE up until the release of BVE 2 in 2001 featured the words: 暴走 VIEW EXPRESS.

== BVE Trainsim 2 ==
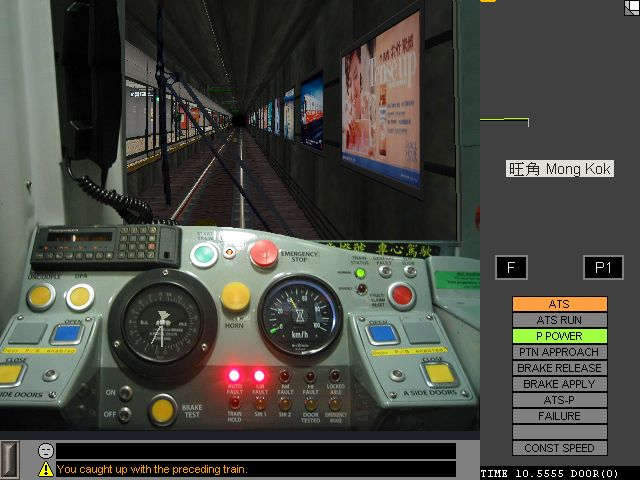
Screenshot of a MTR M-Train EMU driver's cab in BVE 2

The first stable version released in 2001. BVE Trainsim 2 featured ATS and ATC. The latest version of BVE 2 is ver. 2.6.3 which was released on 27 March 2004.

== BVE Trainsim 3 ==
Unreleased and later cancelled, BVE Trainsim 3 was originally started in 2003 as an improvement over BVE Trainsim 2, but was eventually stopped due to problems encountered with development of the aforementioned program.

== BVE Trainsim 4 ==
Screenshot of a British Rail Class 323 driver's cab in BVE 4

BVE Trainsim 4, released in 2005, added support for plugins to simulate train safety systems other than ATS and ATC. Because of the cancellation of version three, this was the first follow-on stable version since version two. It also has better graphics than BVE 2 with the latter being a major update. The latest version of BVE 4 is ver. 4.2.1947.25355 which was released on 1 May 2005.

The London Transport Museum used BVE Trainsim 4 to provide a simulation platform, within a mock underground rolling stock of the London Underground 1996 Stock, before later porting to openBVE in 2010.

== BVE Trainsim 5 ==
BVE Trainsim 5 was officially released on 5 September 2011 as the successor to BVE 4.

In July 2008, the developer stated that he was rewriting BVE Trainsim from scratch because the previously released versions (BVE 2 and BVE 4) do not work with DirectX 9, and that the new version would support Windows Vista and Windows 7.

The first BVE 5 version (ver. 5.0.4265.3690) features a new format for storing train routes and route dependencies and a redesigned interface including a distance to next station indicator and a passenger comfort indicator. The latest version of BVE 5 is ver. 5.7.6224.40815 which was released on 17 March 2017.

The BVE 5 download page also includes a route converter which can convert BVE 4 routes into a format recognised by BVE 5.

== BVE Trainsim 6 ==
BVE Trainsim 6 Release Candidate was announced and made available to the public as the successor to BVE 5 on June 21, 2020. Full release of BVE Trainsim 6 was made available on September 23, 2020.

BVE 6 is released as a 64-bit application, allowing for scenarios with larger data sizes and support for Windows 8.1, Windows 10 and Windows 11. BVE 6 also features support for 64-bit plugins, a new format for vehicle files and support for non-vertical cab gauges.

Included in the new release is the Uchibō Line, a newly developed example scenario demonstrating the new features available in BVE 6.

== openBVE ==
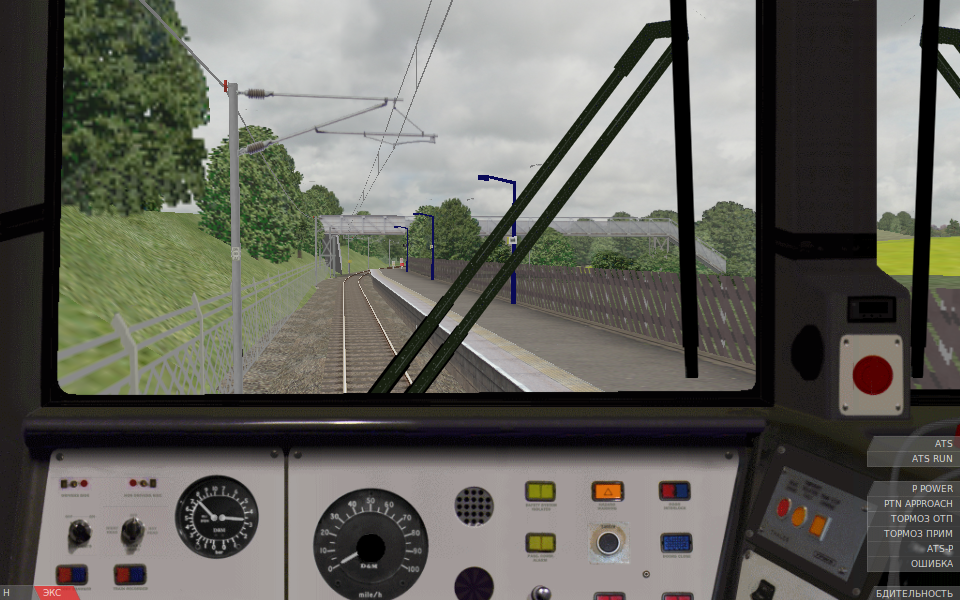
openBVE 1.4.2

openBVE is an independently developed open-source train simulator. Although the name and logo were originally based on BVE Trainsim, openBVE is free and open-source software developed and written from scratch. It features support for train exteriors, animated 3D cab environments and animated scenery. Internally, openBVE makes use of OpenGL for rendering, as well as OpenAL for three-dimensional positional audio.

The program is noted for its cab ambiance and realism. It is currently distributed in the public domain, along with full C# and C source code.

=== History ===
openBVE was originally conceived in 2009, as a free and open-source simulator, capable of running routes from BVE Trainsim, but with the eventual aim of loading content from other simulations, and the development of a separate route format. Initial development was done over four years from 2009 to 2013, by a team of four developers, led by Michelle Boucquemont (michelle) and odakyufan. In 2007 most active development had ended, as the main developer Michelle Boucquemont ended her active work. Despite the lacking developer support, around 2009 openBVE was capable of running most BVE Trainsim routes correctly and also supported additional features, including an exterior view, animated 3D cabs, and animated objects.

To end the stalled development in October 2015 a continuation of OpenBVE was announced on BVEWorldwide by another group of developers. The group transferred the development and codebase to a new repository on GitHub. To date (May 2017), numerous additions were made by the project: new parameters for animated objects and the plugin API, several unfixed errata from the previous openBVE 1.4.3 errata fixed, Dynamic lighting and backgrounds added, and a basic package format has been added to make the installation of addons easier.

OpenBVE was selected in September 2013 as "HotPick" by Linux Format.
