= Microsoft Train Simulator =

2001 video game

- Cover art featuring LNER Class A3 4472 Flying Scotsman
- Developer: Kuju Entertainment (Note: Additional work by ACES)
- Publisher: Microsoft Games
- Director: Paul Chamberlain
- Designer: Phil Marley
- Programmers: Rhona Robson; Paul Wright
- Artists: Dan Frith; Tony Zottola
- Platform: Windows
- Release: NA: June 18, 2001; EU: July 20, 2001
- Genre: Vehicle simulation
- Mode: Single player

Microsoft Train Simulator (informally abbreviated to MSTS) is a 2001 train simulator game developed by UK-based Kuju Entertainment and published by Microsoft Games (now known as Xbox Game Studios) for Windows. It was released on June 18, 2001.

== Features ==
Microsoft Train Simulator allows players to operate a selection of trains on various routes within Europe, Asia, and North America. Gameplay features include the ability to couple wagons, start and stop them, as well as operate trains using mouse and keyboard or hardware accessories (e.g. Raildriver) as controls.

=== Routes ===
The game features six routes in four countries: Austria, Japan, the United Kingdom, and the United States of America.

Route name	Featured operators	Featured trains	Terminal stations	miles	km	Set in	Co
Hisatsu Line	JR Kyushu	KiHa 31	Yatsushiro to Yoshimatsu via Hitoyoshi	53	85	2000; 2001	(Japan)
Innsbruck - St. Anton	BBÖ	Gölsdorf 380	Innsbruck to St. Anton via Imst-Pitztal	63	101	1920s	(Austria)
Marias Pass	BNSF	Dash 9 GP38-2	Shelby to Whitefish, including Kalispell branchline	152	245	2000; 2001	(United States)
Northeast Corridor	Amtrak	Acela Express; Acela HHP-8	Philadelphia to Washington, D.C. via Baltimore	133	214	2000; 2001	(United States)
Settle & Carlisle Line	LNER	Flying Scotsman	Settle to Carlisle via Appleby	72	116	1920s	(United Kingdom)
Tokyo - Hakone	Odakyu Electric Railway	Odakyu 2000 series Odakyu 7000 series LSE	Shinjuku to Hakone-Yumoto via Ebina and Odawara	55	88	2000; 2001	(Japan)

== Reception ==
=== Critic reviews ===
Reception

Aggregate score
Aggregator	Score
Metacritic	84/100

Review scores
Publication	Score
Computer Gaming World	4/5
EP Daily	8/10
Eurogamer	6/10
GameSpot	8.2/10
GameSpy	81%
GameZone	8.5/10
IGN	8/10
Next Generation	4/5
PC Gamer (US)	87%
PC Zone	80%
The Cincinnati Enquirer	4/5

The game received "favorable" reviews according to the review aggregation website Metacritic. John Lee of NextGen said of the game, "All aboard for HO scale fans, trainspotters, and nostalgic rail buffs. Train haters, however, may prefer the old cliché, 'Run for the roundhouse, boys. They can't corner you there.'"

=== Sales ===
The game sold 191,952 units in the U.S. by the end of 2001, which drew revenues of $8.7 million. These numbers rose to 330,000 units ($11.6 million) in the U.S. by August 2006. This led Edge to rank it as the country's 54th-best-selling computer game released in the 21st century in 2006.

Internationally, the game received a "Silver" sales award from the Entertainment and Leisure Software Publishers Association (ELSPA), indicating sales of at least 100,000 units in the UK. In the German market, the Verband der Unterhaltungssoftware Deutschland (VUD) presented it with a "Gold" certification in early 2003, for sales of at least 100,000 units across Germany, Austria, and Switzerland.

The game sold one million units by 2005, and, despite its age, is still very popular and has a large, active community.

=== Awards ===
The game was nominated for the "PC Simulation" award at the Academy of Interactive Arts & Sciences' 5th Annual Interactive Achievement Awards, which ultimately went to Microsoft Flight Simulator 2002.

== Mods ==
The game also included a route and activity editor that enabled users to create and modify routes, trains, and activities. Additionally, the game also allowed for mod support to add and change routes, trains, cargo, scenery, etc. Over 30,000 mods have been created and are mostly hosted on community sites such as TrainSim.com, UKTrainsim.com, and ElvasTower.com. MSTS BIN, a community mod aimed at adding features and fixing old MSTS, was released in 2006.

== Cancelled sequel ==
On May 7, 2003, Microsoft announced that it would be developing a sequel called Microsoft Train Simulator 2; it was first demoed to the public at E3 on May 15. Seemingly, its main improvements were the addition of people to the game (e.g. passengers waiting at the stations, people operating the new locomotive roster, etc.) and turntables. It was being developed by Kuju Entertainment, the original MSTS creators. Despite restructuring efforts at Kuju, the project was handed over to Microsoft Game Studios on August 18, 2003.

This project was ultimately halted, as the following statement on April 24, 2004, from Microsoft confirmed:

Microsoft Game Studios has halted the Windows-based game "Train Simulator 2.0." The decision to halt "Train Simulator 2.0" was made some time ago and was based on a long, hard and difficult look at our business objectives and product offerings. We remain focused on the simulations category with successful, platform-driving franchises such as "Microsoft Flight Simulator."

On January 19, 2007, Microsoft announced the relaunch of the Microsoft Train Simulator project. This time the game was being developed in-house by Aces Game Studio (Microsoft Game Studios) known for its long line of Microsoft Flight Simulators, as a part of the "Games for Windows" initiative. The game would have used the Microsoft Flight Simulator X graphics engine, and it was planned to be compatible with both Windows Vista and Windows XP. A post on "The Little Wheel Goes in Back" blog, written by one of the developers, on August 23, 2007, suggested the working title was "Train Simulator 2".

== Open Rails ==
The Open Rails logo

MSTS is compatible with the open source project Open Rails, created by followers of MSTS, which hosts a collection of third party digital content. MSTS's development ended in 2009; however, community support for MSTS led to the creation of a third party team which created Open Rails.

Open Rails uses the GPL license, and the project has progressed from providing legacy support for MSTS to adding new features. Open Rails supports modern graphics processors, which allows it to achieve increased frame rates compared to MSTS.

A form of Open Rails was used in several studies about the real life operation of railroads, such as in a 2016 study analyzing the impact of cyber attacks on railroads.

== Community ==
TrainSim.Com was the first community to embrace MSTS in 2001, and has an active support community as well as a file library of user created content for the game. Over 50,000 files ranging from entire routes to individual locomotives and cars are available to use with the legacy MSTS game and with Open Rails. As of August 2024, new content is still being developed for the game.

Additional communities, such as UK TrainSim, also emerged, however many of these have since closed down.
