= Train simulator =

Computer-based simulation of rail transport operations

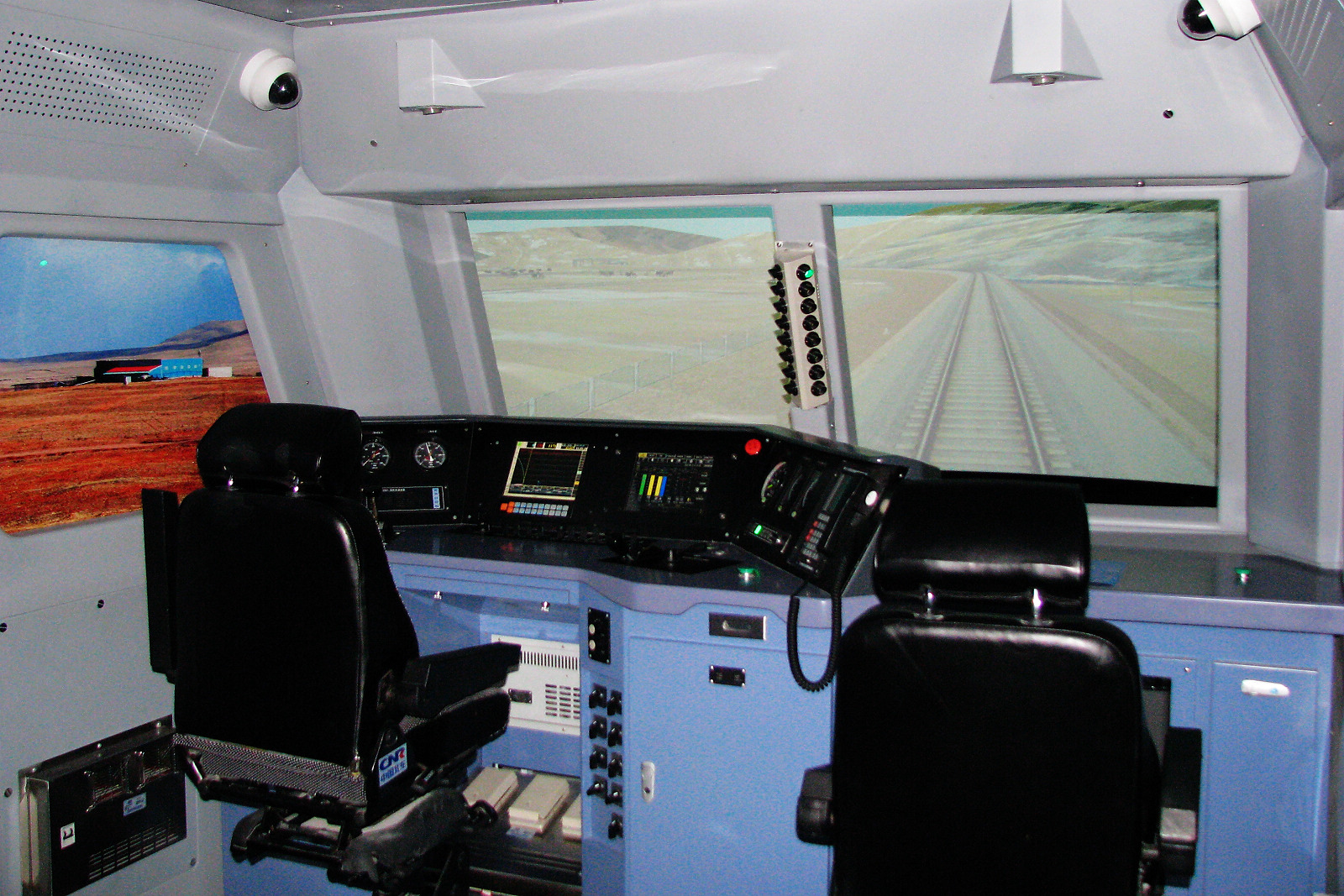
A locomotive driving simulator of a China Railways HXD3B electric locomotive, produced by CNR Dalian and Southwest Jiaotong University

A train simulator (also railroad simulator or railway simulator) is a computer-based simulation of rail transport operations. They are generally large complicated software packages modeling a 3D virtual reality world implemented both as commercial trainers, and consumer computer game software with 'play modes' which lets the user interact by stepping inside the virtual world. Because of the near view modeling, often at speed, train simulator software is generally far more complicated software to write and implement than flight simulator programs.

== Industrial train simulations ==
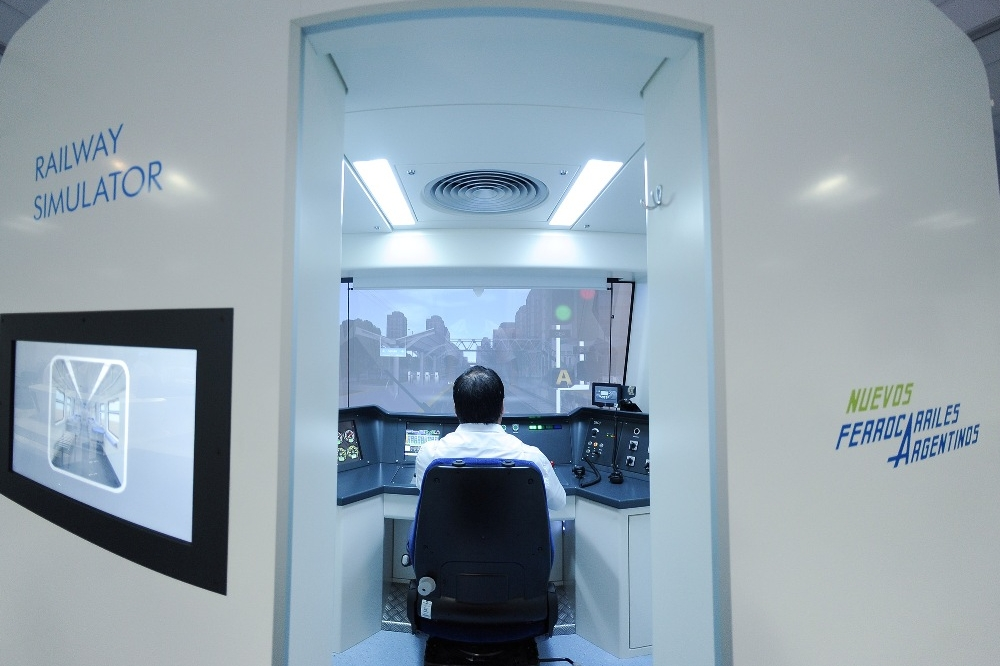
A Ferrocarriles Argentinos Railway Simulator

Like flight simulators, train simulators have been produced for railway training purposes. Driver simulators include those produced by:

- Avansim, based in the UK
- Transurb Simulation, a Belgian-based company
- FAAC (the training division of Arotech Corporation) in the United States
- Ongakukan in Japan
- EADS in Germany
- Bentley Systems in the UK
- Lander Simulation & Training Solutions, Spain
- CORYS, a French company with offices in Grenoble, France and Jacksonville, FL, USA
- Krauss-Maffei Wegmann GmbH & Co KG (KMW), a German company based in Munich
- Oktal Sydac in Australia, France, India and the UK
- SMART Simulation - part of the Neokon Baltija group from Lithuania with offices in the UK and Russia.
- New York Air Brake, an American company based in Watertown, NY.
- PS Technology, an American company based in Boulder, CO.
- Zusi 3 Professional, a German Professional Software to train and educate train drivers. (There is even a hobby version for the community.) The possible routes in the simulator can go mainly through Germany, but also Austria, little Italy and some French.

Signaller training simulators have been developed by Funkwerk in Germany, The Railway Engineering Company (TRE) in the UK, OpenTrack Railway Technology in Switzerland, and PS Technology in the US.

== Types of train simulators ==
There are various types of train driving simulators that are adapted to varying training needs and can be combined to meet operators' training needs in the most efficient way.

=== Full-cabin simulators ===
Similarly to flight simulators, train simulators can be a replica of a full driving cabin, on a one-to-one scale. This type of simulator is opted for when a train operator needs an immersive training tool for particularly effective training sessions.

=== Intermediate, more compact simulators ===
Certain simulators can uphold a certain level of immersion while optimising the space of a training room. When a certain balance between immersion and scalability is needed, this type of simulator is chosen by instructors.

=== Portable simulators ===
When a train operator has various training centres, it is sometimes easier and more logical to invest in smaller simulators that can be transported from one centre to another. The company Transurb Simulation was the first to propose such a tool, which has now been adopted by many operators around the world and is becoming of a growing interest for smaller operators.

== Consumer train simulation ==
Many consumer train simulations have been produced, often focusing on different aspects of real-life railways.

=== Driving simulation ===
Train driving simulation games usually allow a user to have a "driver's view" from the locomotive's cab and operate realistic cab controls such as throttle, brake valve, sand, horn and whistle, lights etc.

Train driving simulation software (by order of introduction) includes:

- Train Simulator series (a.k.a. Railfan)
- Densha de Go!, a Japanese train simulation game series focused on driving, developed by Taito.
- 3D Ultra Lionel Traintown (1999), amongst some others, give a different experience to driving, by being in a 3rd person omniscient perspective, controlling the trains from a bird's eye view.
- BVE Trainsim (originally Boso View Express) is a Japanese three-dimensional computer-based train simulator. It is notable for focusing on providing an accurate driving experience as viewed from inside the cab, rather than creating a network of other trains—There are no outside views, drivers can only look directly ahead, and other trains passed along the route are only displayed as stationary objects.
- Microsoft Train Simulator (MSTS), developed by Kuju Entertainment.
- Trainz, a train simulator developed by N3V Games
- OpenBVE is a free and open-source train simulator developed independently from BVE Trainsim. Most OpenBVE routes are developed by independent, third-party providers.
- Train Simulator (originally RailWorks), a successor to Rail Simulator created when a new company, Rail Simulator Developments Ltd, purchased the rights. In 2013 RSDL rebranded themselves as Dovetail Games, and renamed Railworks to simply Train Simulator.
  - Train Sim World, a successor to the above developed by Dovetail Games using the Unreal Engine.
- Rail Simulator, a spiritual successor to MSTS also developed by Kuju Entertainment.

Peripherals specifically designed for use with driving simulations include RailDriver by US manufacturer P.I. Engineering. RailDriver is a programmable desktop cab controller with throttle, brake lever and switches designed to work with Trainz, TrainMaster, Microsoft Train Simulator and Rail Simulator.

=== Strategy simulation ===
Railroad-themed strategy simulation video games are focused mostly on the economic part of the railroad industry rather than on technical detail. The A-Train series (1985 to present) is an early example. Chris Sawyer's Transport Tycoon (1994) was an influential game in this genre, spawning remakes such as Simutrans (1999 to present), OpenTTD (2004 to present) and Sawyer's own Locomotion (2004). Sid Meier designed two railroad simulations: Railroad Tycoon (1990) and Railroads! (2006). The Railroad Tycoon series itself inspired other rail games such as Rails Across America (2001). Elements of strategy games in turn were retroactively introduced to driving simulators in the 2020s, with Railroader (2024) and Century of Steam (in development) both as examples of train simulators including economic gameplay elements inspired by strategy games, but set in a ground level first person simulator perspective. Modern games in the traditional top-down strategy perspective includes titles such as Mashinky (2017) and the Railway Empire series.

=== Other genres ===
Some rail simulation games focus on railway signalling rather than driving or economics. Examples include The Train Game (1983), SimSig, JBSS BAHN, Train Dispatcher, and the series of signalling simulations produced by PC-Rail Software.

== History ==
Train simulators are particularly popular in Japan, where rail transport is the primary form of travel for most citizens. Train video games have been developed in Japan since the early 1980s, with Sega's arcade video game Super Locomotive (1982) being an early example, before more realistic train simulators emerged, such as Ongakukan's Train Simulator series (1995 debut) and Taito's Densha de Go series (1996 debut), as well as train business simulations such as the A-Train series (1985 debut). Non-commercial Japanese sims include the freeware BVE, first released in 1996, which was later remade as the free and open-source OpenBVE.

One of the first commercially available train simulators in the West was Southern Belle, released in 1985. The game simulated a journey of the Southern Belle steam passenger train from London Victoria to Brighton, while at the same time the player must comply with speed limits, not to go too fast on curves and keep to the schedule. It was followed with Evening Star in 1987. The first two train simulators to achieve large sales in the West, Microsoft Train Simulator and Trainz, arrived within a few months of one another in 2001. These featured differing design philosophies - Microsoft Train Simulator focused on providing a realistic driving experience, whereas Trainz focused more on the ability of the user to create their own content such as trains and routes.

The developers behind Microsoft Train Simulator, Kuju Entertainment, later released a spiritual successor called Rail Simulator, which was later purchased by a separate company and rereleased as Railworks.

Through the 2010s into the 2020s, the train simulator genre benefited from direct to consumer digital releases by services such as Steam. During the decade Dovetail Games continued development of Railworks, which was rebranded as Train Simulator, and released a sequel, Train Sim World, for PC and consoles in 2017. A spin-off from Train Sim World based on the Thomas & Friends franchise was announced in 2026, becoming a viral phenomenon by attracting gaming press and social media attention. Indie train simulator games have also included titles such as Derail Valley (2018), Railroads Online (2024) and Train Sim (2014), developed by 3583 Bytes.

== See also ==
- Flight simulator – contains reference to flight simulators
- Strategy computer game
