= Thomas & Friends: Wonders of Sodor =

2026 video game

- Developer: Dovetail Games
- Publishers: Dovetail Games; Maximum Games
- Series: Thomas & Friends
- Engine: Unreal Engine
- Platforms: PlayStation 4; PlayStation 5; Windows; Xbox One; Xbox Series X/S; Nintendo Switch
- Release: PS4, PS5, Windows, Xbox One, Xbox Series X/S; March 17, 2026; Nintendo Switch; June 9, 2026
- Genres: Adventure, simulation
- Mode: Single-player

Thomas & Friends: Wonders of Sodor is a 2026 adventure-simulation video game developed by Dovetail Games. Based on the Thomas & Friends television series and built off the Train Sim World games, it allows players to control numerous characters from the series across the Island of Sodor in stories, timetables and shunting challenges. It was released for PlayStation 4, PlayStation 5, Windows, Xbox One, and Xbox Series X and Series S on March 17, 2026, with a Nintendo Switch version following on June 9, 2026. Physical copies including downloadable content are published by Maximum Games. It has received generally positive reception from critics.

== Gameplay ==
In Wonders of Sodor, the player can drive Thomas & Friends locomotive characters.

Thomas & Friends: Wonders of Sodor is a simulation game with adventure elements. It is built on Train Sim World, a train simulator series developed by Dovetail Games in Unreal Engine. It takes place on the Island of Sodor, which was recreated in its entirety as accurately as possible. The player is able to drive six locomotives from the Thomas & Friends series: Thomas, Percy, Gordon, Diesel, Emily, and James. The latter is accessed via downloadable content. The player can choose to make the controls either simplified or realistic.

Eight stories inspired by The Railway Series books and the Thomas & Friends television series, narrated by Mark Moraghan, can be played through. Other modes include the "Timetable" mode which lets the player play a "day in the life" of a chosen character, the "Explore" mode where the player can freely walk across the island in a first-person view, and the "Shunting Challenge" where the player must arrange Troublesome Trucks into a select order in the least amount of moves. Additionally, collectible items are hidden across the island and can be found by the player.

== Release ==
Dovetail Games announced Thomas & Friends: Wonders of Sodor in February 2026. The announcement went viral; by March, the trailer surpassed 150,000 views on Xbox's YouTube channel. One commenter noted that it had more views than active players in Call of Duty: Black Ops 7 (2025). The launch announcement post on PlayStation's X account has been viewed over five million times.

Thomas & Friends: Wonders of Sodor released for PlayStation 4, PlayStation 5, Windows, Xbox One, and Xbox Series X and Series S on March 17, 2026, followed by a Nintendo Switch version on June 9. The Xbox versions are compatible with the Play Anywhere initiative. A physical deluxe edition including the James downloadable content, published by Maximum Games, are planned for a release later in 2026. The deluxe edition is the only version to be released physically.

== Reception ==
Reception

Aggregate score
| Aggregator | Score |
|---|---|
| OpenCritic | 57% recommended |

Review scores
| Publication | Score |
|---|---|
| MonsterVine | 4/5 |
| WayTooManyGames | 3.5 |

On the review aggregation website OpenCritic, Thomas & Friends: Wonders of Sodor has a top critical average of 68, with 57% of critics recommending it. Aaron Down from PCGamesN called Wonders of Sodor "an absolute dream for nostalgics". Tom Hopkins, also from PCGamesN, criticised the game mechanics being designed for older train fans, whereas the rest of the game is "perfect" for young children, but praised its nostalgic elements. Tom Ravencroft for MonsterVine considered it a "surprisingly challenging" introduction to train simulators, praised the in-game world, but called the user interface "janky". Benjamin B from Netto's Game Room recommended the game, praised the train simulation elements, but found failing missions to be "annoying" and restarting from the beginning "rarely enjoyable". In a negative review from WayTooManyGames, Leo Faria wrote, "Instead of being a kid-friendly game, it is the same simulator-heavy, and overly punitive Train Sim World, but clunkier, buggier, and with possibly the worst tutorial mode in the history of gaming."
