= Paul Jackson (game producer) =

British video game producer and publisher (born 1962)

Paul Jackson OBE
- Born: 1962 (age 63–64)
- Occupations: Co-founder and CEO of Dovetail Games (formerly known as RailSimulator.com)
- Known for: Video game producer

Paul Stafford Jackson, OBE (born 1962) is a British video game producer and publisher.

In 1993, Jackson established the British office of Electronic Arts. At EA UK, he was involved in brand-building for The Sims series of games. Whilst at EA, he was approached by Kuju Entertainment seeking interest in publishing Rail Simulator, a successor to Microsoft Train Simulator which Microsoft Games had declined to publish.

On 1 August 2006, Jackson took over from Roger Bennett as director-general of the Entertainment and Leisure Software Publishers Association, the British video game industry trade group, having served on their board for twelve years since 1992, with three years as chairman.

In 2008, after leaving the publishers association, Jackson returned to the Rail Simulator franchise, arranging to buy the rights to the project, and becoming CEO of the resulting development company, RailSimulator.com Ltd. The company released RailWorks, the successor to Rail Simulator, in 2009. Since December 2013, the company has been known as Dovetail Games.

In 2010, Jackson was made an Officer of the Order of the British Empire (OBE) in the New Year Honours for services to the video game industry.
