= Train Simulator Classic =

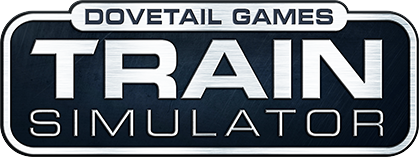
- Developer: Dovetail Games
- Publisher: Dovetail Games
- Producer: Paul Jackson
- Platform: Microsoft Windows
- Release: 12 June 2009; 16 years ago
- Genre: Vehicle simulation
- Mode: Single-player

Train Simulator Classic (originally RailWorks and Train Simulator) is a train simulation game developed by Dovetail Games. It is the successor to Rail Simulator, and was released online on 12 June 2009 and in stores on 3 July.

It is a Steamworks title, which means it uses and requires Steam to activate and to deliver core game updates. Steam is used to deliver additional routes and locomotives in the form of paid downloadable content.

The core game has received several updates since release, with the game's title adjusted to coincide with major releases. In 2010, RailWorks became RailWorks 2: Train Simulator and was then followed by RailWorks 3: Train Simulator 2012. The RailWorks branding was dropped with the next major release, titled simply Train Simulator 2013, and this naming convention would continue with yearly releases until Train Simulator 2022. The current version, Train Simulator Classic 2024, was released on 21 May 2024.

== Releases ==
The first major update to RailWorks was RailWorks 2: Train Simulator, released on Steam on 18 October 2010 under the name RailWorks 2. Retail versions were released later that year. The new version contained a range of new features and enhancements, including enhanced menus, the new RS Cab Control driver interface and new RS Career System scenarios. Players could earn Steam Achievements for completing scenarios, as well as compete and compare scores online via Steam Leaderboards. It also featured level crossing animations, among other improvements. RailWorks 2 featured the same routes and content as the original game, and only one new route: TestTraK, based on the Wegberg-Wildenrath Test and Validation Centre, a German testing facility owned by Siemens Mobility used for technical acceptance tests and approvals of locomotives and rolling stock. Contents in retail versions could vary in different countries to include local routes and locomotives. Owners of the original RailWorks received a free upgrade to the RailWorks 2 core technology via the Steam platform.

RailWorks 3: Train Simulator 2012 was released on Steam on 23 September 2011 under the name Train Simulator 2012. Retail versions were released later that year. It contained a number of improvements and new features, including a new user interface, action-oriented loading screens, the new TSX game engine with multi-core and FXAA support and many graphical improvements, such as extended draw distance, improved lighting and shadows, enhanced sky and water effects, new depth of field camera focus effect and particle effects (e.g. rain drops on locomotive windows with working wipers), superelevation to allow simulation of curved tracks, improved track unevenness and cab camera movement increasing with speed, improved editing tools and others. The base package contained nine routes, and those who purchased from Steam or purchased the retail Deluxe Edition, also received the Horseshoe Curve route. Contents in retail versions could vary in different countries to include local routes and locomotives. Owners of RailWorks 2 received a free upgrade to the TS2012 core technology via the Steam platform.

Train Simulator 2013 was released on Steam in two editions. The Standard Edition, available for a limited time, was released on 20 September 2012. The Deluxe Edition was released on 10 October. Retail versions were available from October that year. New features and improvements included Xbox 360 Controller support, Relay Play mode allowing for users to combine efforts to complete scenarios (removed since Train Simulator 2014), new menus and control options (including the new Quick Drive mode), updated HUDs, improved 2D task map and support for a new community download center using the Steam Workshop where players can share and download free user-created scenarios. It also featured enhanced graphics and performance improvements. A route included with previous versions, Hagen–Siegen, was heavily updated and renamed the Ruhr–Sieg Line. Routes included with the Standard Edition were Sherman Hill, London–Brighton, Northeast Corridor and Isle of Wight. The Deluxe Edition included Sherman Hill, London–Brighton and Munich–Augsburg. Contents in retail versions could vary in different countries to include local routes and locomotives. Owners of Train Simulator 2012 received a free upgrade to the TS2013 core technology via the Steam platform.

Train Simulator 2014 was released on Steam in two editions. The Steam Edition was released on 26 September 2013, and the Standard Edition on 7 October. Retail versions were available from 4 October that year. It featured a new menu system, better graphics including increased draw distance and headlight flares, a new camera system with user-adjustable FOV, improved passenger appearance and behaviour, improved editing tools, expanded Quick Drive mode and an enhanced Career mode, letting players earn points towards medals, rewards and achievements. The new Engine Driver community website was made accessible in-game. The Steam Workshop feature was expanded to support free user-created routes, in addition to scenarios, and the new Marketplace was designed to make it simpler to share and obtain new third-party payware content. Routes included with the Standard Edition were Hamburg–Hanover, London–Faversham High Speed and Donner Pass: Southern Pacific. Those who purchased the Steam Edition, also received an additional seven-mile (11 km) Sheerness Branch line in Kent (an extension to the London–Faversham High Speed route) and two extra locomotives (Class 466 and SD70M). Contents in retail versions could vary in different countries to include local routes and locomotives. Owners of Train Simulator 2013 received a free upgrade to the TS2014 core technology via the Steam platform. A stand-alone expansion, The Count of Monster Disco, was released for Halloween 2014.

Train Simulator 2015 was released on Steam on 18 September 2014 as a Standard Edition and a Steam Edition. Retail versions were available from 19 September that year. It introduced several improvements and a learning mode called TS Academy, a training area designed to introduce new players to the series quickly and easily. Routes included with the Standard Edition were East Coast Main Line: London–Peterborough, Northeast Corridor: New York–New Haven and Munich–Garmisch-Partenkirchen. Those who purchased the Steam Edition, also received the Pacific Surfliner: LA–San Diego route and two extra locomotives (Los Angeles Commuter Rail F59PH and San Diego Commuter Rail F59PHI). Contents in retail versions could vary in different countries to include local routes and locomotives. Owners of Train Simulator 2014 received a free upgrade to the TS2015 core technology via the Steam platform.

Train Simulator 2016 was released on Steam on 17 September 2015 as Train Simulator 2016: Steam Edition. This version provides a selection of new 'extreme' challenges set across a variety of different eras with the addition of the long-requested "Railfan" feature, which lets players create and play scenarios in which the only objective is to watch the trains go by from a vantage point (so-called "Railfanning" or "Trainspotting").

Train Simulator 2017 was released on Steam on 16 September 2016. A limited edition of Train Simulator 2017, called Pioneers Edition, was available for players until 7 December of the same year. The Pioneers Edition included two bonuses: a bonus route, Semmeringbahn: Mürzzuschlag to Gloggnitz and the ability to have beta access to Train Sim World: CSX Heavy Haul, an Unreal Engine 4 made game that was released in early 2017. The beta access to Train Sim World: CSX Heavy Haul started at 8 December 2016 at around 6pm GMT.

Train Simulator 2018 was released on 16 November 2017.

Train Simulator 2019 was released on 11 October 2018. This version introduced a 64-bit core, making the game able to use more memory and generally have better stability. The game comes with 3 routes and 2 route extensions; Soldier Summit and Salt Lake City Extension, the Rhine Railway and Frankfurt High Speed Extension, and the re-worked Portsmouth Direct Line, now including London Waterloo station.

Train Simulator 2020, released on 19 September 2019, comes with three routes: Nuremberg & Regensburg, South Western Main Line: Southampton – Bournemouth and Norfolk Southern N-Line. It also comes with some graphical improvements, and filters for taking photos in-game.

Train Simulator 2021 was released on 17 September 2020. This version introduces Steam Workshop integration, letting players browse and download Workshop scenarios without having to exit the game. This year's edition comes with three routes: Norddeutsche-bahn: Kiel – Lübeck, Clinchfield Railroad, the Fife Circle Line. The Deluxe Edition also includes a new route, the West Coast Main Line South: London Euston – Birmingham. In March 2021, the game received an update that improves route loading times.

== Features ==
The game features steam, diesel and electric traction trains; keyboard, mouse or gamepad are used to control throttles, brakes and switches with Simple and Expert driving models for varying player skills. A variety of scenarios are available for Standard and Career modes, as well as an exploratory style Free Roam mode. Quick Drive mode allows a player to pick a train (or to put together their own by snapping together cars), choose a route, set departure and destination stations and decide on the time of day, the season and the weather. Cargo and passengers are animated, and weather changes dynamically with time. Steam Workshop allows players to upload and download additional user-created routes and scenarios.

=== Editing tools ===
A complete suite of tools is also available to create custom content. This allows players to create their own custom routes and scenarios with the in-game editor, or to create custom rolling stock and other 3D assets that can be imported in game via the Blueprint Editor. The route editor has the ability to import Digital Elevation Model data (DEM) to shape the terrain and has a built in Google Maps overlay. These two tools massively simplify creation of real world routes. Track laying is spline-based, giving almost unlimited freedom over the track shape. The scenario editor lets players create their own custom scenario, with a defined set of instruction, like having to make passenger stops, shunting and various other tasks. Scenarios can also have scripting, making simulation of possible failures and other unexpected events possible. The Blueprint Editor lets creators import their models and textures into the game. With this tool, creators can import pretty much anything in the game, like custom skyboxes, ground textures, track, roads, vegetation, buildings, track linked object (like signals) and various other scenery assets, and of course rolling stock too.

== Downloadable content ==
Various add-ons are available for Train Simulator, containing routes and rolling stock units for Quick Drive use, as well as scenarios for Standard, Career and Free Roam modes.

Add-ons directly created by Dovetail Games can be found on Steam as DLC. The game is infamous for the sheer amount of DLC available on Steam, costing over $10,000 in its entirety.

== Critical reception ==
IGN gave RailWorks a seven out of ten, or "good", stating that the game "doesn't bring a lot of new stuff to the genre" and graphically "lacks the high-end flair of today's top-level titles".

RailWorks 2 won the award for Simulation of the Year 2010 by readers of Game Industry News (GiN).
