= Dovetail Games =

British video game developer and publisher

- Type: Subsidiary
- Industry: Video games
- Founded: 2008 (18 years ago) as Rail Simulator Developments Ltd
- Founders: Paul Jackson, Tim Gatland, Charlie McMicking
- Headquarters: Chatham, Kent, United Kingdom
- Key people: Paul Jackson, Charlie McMicking, Gemma Johnson-Brown, Jon Rissik, Rob O'Farrell, Gray Poyda
- Products: Train Simulator (RailWorks); Train Sim World; Euro Fishing; Fishing Sim World
- Number of employees: 170
- Parent: Focus Entertainment
- Website: www.dovetailgames.com

Dovetail Games (DTG), a trading name of RailSimulator.com Ltd (RSC), is a British simulation video game developer and publisher established in 2008 by former Electronic Arts executive Paul Jackson, Fund4Games backers Tim Gatland and Charlie McMicking, and a development team from Kuju Entertainment.

Originally focused on developing new content for Kuju Entertainment's Rail Simulator, they would go on to produce successors RailWorks/Train Simulator and Train Sim World, as well as fishing and flight simulation games.

In April 2023, Dovetail Games announced its acquisition by Focus Entertainment.

== History ==
RailWorks' predecessor, Rail Simulator, was developed by Kuju Entertainment, the same company that developed Microsoft Train Simulator with Microsoft. With the release of Rail Simulator in October 2007, Kuju Entertainment finished development and disbanded the development team, turning its attention to the next project.

Knowing the potential of their proprietary game engine, and with backing from Fund4Games (Tim Gatland and Charlie McMicking), and support from the South East England Development Agency (SEEDA), a new company was set up called Rail Simulator Developments Ltd (RSDL) from some of the core members of the initial development team with the specific aim of fulfilling continued development of the brand and supporting users and third-party developers with add-on projects. RSDL produced two patches to the core simulator, developed and released add-ons, helped the release of third-party products, and visited exhibitions to promote the simulation and provide support for users via several community websites.

In April 2009, the formation of a new company was announced. Jackson, Gatland and McMicking went on to set up RailSimulator.com Ltd (RSC), employing many of the original creative team, along with Steve Bainbridge (previously of Electronic Arts and GAME stores) and Duncan Best (previously British Academy Video Games Awards, ELSPA and Director of the London Games Festival).

Development switched to a new version of the software called RailWorks, which would be released on Steam. This change heralded a break from Electronic Arts being the publisher in Europe and rights over the source code for Rail Simulator being transferred to single ownership by RailSimulator.com Ltd. After improving the software, they launched RailWorks in June 2009. The company has released yearly updates since then, with the latest version, Train Simulator Classic, released in April 2022.

On 9 December 2013, it was announced that RailSimulator.com has changed its name to Dovetail Games. The company said that it was in the early stages of developing a range of completely new simulation products to sit alongside Train Simulator, and this broader perspective required a new company name.

Dovetail Games announced on 1 July 2014 its first new simulation product; a fishing simulation game titled Euro Fishing (initially Dovetail Games Fishing), utilising Epic Games' Unreal Engine 4 architecture and released for PC on 4 November 2014, with more formats to follow. The company also announced that it is laying the foundation to using Unreal Engine 4 in future versions of Train Simulator.

On 9 July 2014, Dovetail Games announced that it has signed a licensing agreement with Microsoft to release Microsoft Flight Simulator X: Gold Edition on Steam in late 2014, titled Microsoft Flight Simulator X: Steam Edition. It includes content that was provided with the original FSX: Gold Edition which includes FSX: Deluxe Edition, the Acceleration expansion pack and both official Service Packs and repackages them in one bundle and a single installation. It also replaces the now-defunct GameSpy multiplayer systems with Steamworks features, enabling multiplayer to work without 3rd party software. Likewise, it also sorted out a number of software bugs.

The company also announced that it will be developing and producing all-new flight simulation software based on Microsoft's genre-defining flight technology. Following the announcement, the company announced on 25 July 2014 that it will be working in partnership with Flight One Software (Flight1), a developer and publisher of flight simulation content, to deliver a range of Flight1 add-ons for Microsoft Flight Simulator X: Steam Edition. On 9 December 2014, Dovetail Games announced the launch date of Microsoft Flight Simulator X: Steam Edition would be 18 December 2014.

On 4 August 2015, Dovetail Games announced plans with Microsoft to bring a number of its future releases to Windows 10 and Xbox One in 2016. The company said that Euro Fishing, currently available on PC through Steam, will be released on Xbox One. The next generation of the Train Simulator franchise, powered by Unreal Engine 4, will be released on both platforms and Dovetail Games Flight Simulator, built on the foundations of Microsoft's Flight technology, will be released on PC. On 15 March 2016 Xbox announced that Flight School will be released on Windows 10.

In September 2016, Dovetail Games announced Train Sim World, a new train simulator using Epic's Unreal Engine 4 and featuring the ability to walk around in the world. Train Sim World was later released in March 2017.

In May 2017, Dovetail Games announced their new flight simulator, Flight Sim World, which released later that month. However, a year after release, Dovetail Games announced it would stop development of Flight Sim World and remove it from sale in May 2018.

In August 2020, Train Sim World 2 was released. While Dovetail Games was never able to deliver the promised multiplayer in the previous version, they say it is in their "future roadmap" and that Train Sim World 2 has "a design that we think will give a great social experience".

Around the same time, the company launched We Are Railfans, an online rail community aiming to bring many aspects of railfanning to one place. By the end of 2021, hundreds of website articles on trainspotting, heritage rail, modelling and photography had been published to a growing community of over 35,000 Facebook users. The We Are Railfans Podcast supplemented this with detailed interviews from those within rail, including locomotive drivers, authors and TV personalities.

On 28 October 2021, Dovetail Games released Bassmaster Fishing 2022 for PlayStation 5, PlayStation 4, Xbox Series X / S and Xbox One. It is an officially licensed game from the real world Bassmaster series of amateur and elite events. The game features 10 pro anglers including Scott Martin and Hank Cherry as well as 8 real world locations. A multiplayer mode is also featured.

9 August 2022 saw the announcement of Train Sim World 3, for release on 6 September 2022 on PlayStation 5, PlayStation 4, Xbox, Steam and Epic Games Store. The announcement was preceded by a lengthy tease video which hinted at the various features to be included in the latest release, such as volumetric skies, a new dynamic weather system and the three new routes: Cajon Pass, Southeastern Highspeed (Extended) and Kassel-Würzburg.

On 20 April 2023, Dovetail Games announced that they had been acquired by French video game developer Focus Entertainment in a mostly cash transaction. Full financial terms of the sale were not disclosed.

In September 2023, Train Sim World 4 was released with brand-new features such as free roam, photo mode and formation designer.

On 20 August 2024, Train Sim World 5, the eighth iteration of the series was announced and was released on 17 September, one year on from the release of Train Sim World 4. For existing users, the base game is a free upgrade, which was initially available for thirty days from the release date, but was extended to early 2025.

The ninth iteration of the series, Train Sim World 6, was announced on 8 July 2025, and was released on 30 September.

In 2025, Dovetail announced the rail-simulator racing game Metro Rivals: New York, and in 2026 a Thomas & Friends game, titled Thomas & Friends: Wonders of Sodor. On April 15, 2026, Dovetail Games announced through their Metro Rivals Facebook page with a statement that they are ceasing development on the game.

On 25 August 2026, Train Sim World 7, the tenth iteration in the series, was announced and was released on 15 September.

== Games developed ==
- RailWorks (2009)
- Euro Fishing (2015)
- Flight School (2016)
- Train Sim World (2017)
- Fishing Sim World (2018)
- Fishing Sim World: Bass Pro Shops Edition (2020)
- Train Sim World 2 (2020)
- The Catch: Carp & Coarse Fishing (2020)
- Bassmaster Fishing 2022 (2021)
- Train Sim World 3 (2022)
- Train Sim World 4 (2023)
- Train Sim World 5 (2024)
- Train Sim World 6 (2025)
- Thomas & Friends: Wonders of Sodor (2026)
- Train Sim World 7 (2026)
