= Rail Simulator =

2007 video game

- UK box cover
- Developer: Kuju Entertainment
- Publisher: Electronic Arts
- Engine: Proprietary game engine, Ageia PhysX for physics (Now PhysX (By nVidia)
- Platform: Microsoft Windows
- Release: EU: October 12, 2007; 18 years ago; NA: January 16, 2008; 18 years ago
- Genre: Vehicle simulation
- Mode: Single-player

Rail Simulator is a train simulation published by Electronic Arts (EA). It was produced by Kuju Entertainment. After release of the EU version, EA's support and further development of the title was taken over by Rail Simulator Developments Ltd, who continued to provide updates, fixes, official expansion packs and new content to players. RSDL has also released a sequel to the first game called RailWorks.

== Features ==
Steam, diesel and electric traction trains, keyboard or mouse control of throttles, brakes and switches with three control modes for varying player skills. A variety of scenarios are available as well as an exploratory style free roam mode. Cargos and passengers are animated, and weather changes dynamically with time. The game has been criticized by reviewers for not providing enough help for newcomers to train simulation, and lack of complete instructions in the guides.

=== Editing tools ===
A complete tool suite is also available to customise content, allowing terrain modeling either by hand using provided tools or via the import of DEM data from NASA; track construction based on a system of straights and arcs, allowing infinitely possible junction configurations, and scenery placement. A scenario editor allows the creation of tasks such as picking up passengers, hauling cargo and shunting wagons around yards. These tools also allow players to build unlimited sizes of layouts, create their own scenery and rolling stock and modify the provided content by adding features or re-skins.

== Reception ==
Since release, Kuju Rail Simulator received generally positive reviews from reviewers. IGN awarded 7.0 out of 10, praising the title's attention to its source material. Some jagged graphics were criticized (with foliage going through the cab instead of bouncing off the windshield, for example) and the fact that only true rail fanatics could ever get any fun out of KRS. The lack of any in-game tutorials was mentioned, with "members of the community ... making video walk-throughs, while lamenting the lack of a thick, fully printed manual."

== After release ==
With the release of Rail Simulator in October 2007, Kuju Entertainment finished development and disbanded the RailSim team turning its attention to the next project. Knowing the potential of the RailSim engine, and with backing from Fund4Games who owned the rights to the simulator, a new company was set up from some of the core members of the initial development team with the specific aim of fulfilling continued development of the brand and supporting users and third-party developers with add-on projects.

RSDL produced two patches to the core simulator (Upgrade Mk1 and Mk2), developed and released add-ons, helped the release of third-party products, and visited exhibitions to promote the simulation and provide support for users via several community websites.

In April 2009, a take over of RSDL was announced, with the development switching to a new version of the software called RailWorks which would be released on Steam. This change heralded a break from EA being the publisher in Europe and rights over the source code for Rail Simulator being transferred to single ownership by RailSimulator.com Ltd.

== Successor ==
RailWorks (since renamed to Train Simulator Classic) is the official successor to Rail Simulator, announced by Tim Gatland on March 26, 2009, on the official Rail Simulator website. The game was released on Steam on June 12, 2009, and in stores on July 3, 2009, in DVD-ROM format.

RailWorks is an upgrade to Rail Simulator, containing new rolling stock, tools that had to be separately downloaded, significant graphical advancements such as modification of the existing content, bug fixes, backwards compatibility and the ability to trade elements from the virtual world with other users online. RailWorks is a universal platform containing all content from the original European release and North American release. RailWorks also makes use of Valve's Steam platform to simplify the processes of support and upgrading the product.
