= Guild (disambiguation) =

A guild is an association of craftspeople or merchants in a particular trade.

Guild may also refer to:

== Arts, entertainment, and media ==
- Guild (computer gaming), an organized group of players who regularly play video games together
- Guild (video game series), game compilations Guild01 and Guild02 from Level-5
- Europa 1400: The Guild, a 2002 simulation video game
- The Guild 2, a 2006 simulation video game, sequel to Europa 1400: The Guild
- The Guild – Europa 1410, a 2026 simulation video game, Reboot of The Guild Series
- The Guild (web series), a comedy series created by Felicia Day
- In fantasy, an organization that aims to give aid to adventurers, for example a Thieves' guild

== Brands and enterprises ==
- Guild Guitar Company, a guitar manufacturer
- Guild Inn, a park and hotel in Toronto

== Places ==
- Guild, Missouri, United States
- Guild, New Hampshire, United States

== Science ==
- Guild (ecology), a group of species that exploit the same resources, or different resources in related ways
- Guild (permaculture), a group of species within which each provides a unique set of diverse functions that work in conjunction or harmony

== Other uses ==
- Guild (surname)
- Guild Home Video, a UK home distribution company
- The Guild, Preston, a grade II listed public house in Preston, England
- The Guild of European Research-Intensive Universities, a network of European research universities
- The Guild, short common name of the Church of Scotland Guild (formerly the Woman's Guild)
- S-25 Berkut (NATO reporting name SA-1 "Guild"), a Soviet surface-to-air missile system

== See also ==
- Gild (disambiguation)
- Guild Theatre (disambiguation)
