= Fishtank Interactive =

Defunct German publishing label

- Company type: Label
- Industry: Video games
- Founded: 2000
- Defunct: May 2002
- Fate: Acquired by JoWooD Productions alongside its parent company
- Headquarters: Ravensburg, Germany
- Parent: Ravensburger Interactive

Fishtank Interactive was a German publishing label and was a division of Ravensburger Spieleverlag's Ravensburger Interactive. It was founded in 2000 to try to expand the horizons of Ravensburger Spieleverlag by publishing more mature games than the rest of the mostly pre-school oriented games of the company, without sullying its reputation. Its releases were usually action games, or real-time strategies, and were known for low production values highlighted by the lack of important features like multi-player playability. The division alongside its parent were sold in May 2002 to JoWooD Productions.

== Releases ==
Fishtank Interactive released the following games for PC:

- 1914 - The Great War
- AquaNox - also released for Xbox
- Archangel
- Beam Breakers
- Car Tycoon
- Etherlords
- Evil Islands: Curse of the Lost Soul
- RIM: Battle Planets
- S.W.I.N.E.
