= JoWooD =

Austrian video game publisher

JoWooD Entertainment AG
- Formerly: JoWooD Productions Software GmbH (1995–2000); JoWooD Productions Software AG (2000–2009)
- Type: Public
- Industry: Video games
- Founded: 1995; 31 years ago
- Founders: Andreas Tobler; Hans Schilcher
- Defunct: June 2011
- Fate: Bankruptcy
- Headquarters: Rottenmann (Liezen District), Styria, Austria
- Products: Gothic series; SpellForce series; The Guild and The Guild 2; AquaNox series; Neighbours from Hell; Ski Racing series
- Subsidiaries: DreamCatcher Interactive

JoWooD Entertainment AG (formerly JoWooD Productions Software AG, commonly referred to as JoWooD) was an Austrian video game publisher that was founded in 1995. JoWooD went into administration in 2011 and all assets were purchased by Nordic Games.

Its games include the futuristic racing car game Beam Breakers which was released in 2002, action role-playing games in the Gothic series, the SpellForce series, and the Industry Giant series of games. Other titles include Transport Giant, World War III: Black Gold, The Sting!, Hotel Giant, and other games of the Giants series.

== History ==
JoWooD Productions Software AG was founded in 1995 in Ebensee by Dieter Bernauer, Johann Reitinger, Johann Schilcher, and Andreas Tobler with its headquarters later moved to Liezen, Austria.

In May 2000, JoWooD went public through the prime market section of the Vienna Stock Exchange. Earlier on in the year, they invested 15% in publisher Media Publishing GmbH & Co KG, and acquired the developer Wings Simulations. In September, they acquired NEON Software in Germany and Massive Development in December.

On 18 January 2001, JoWooD announced that it had purchased a 70% stake in Dynamic Systems, a video game distributor founded by JoWooD co-founder Andrea Tobler, with which they already distributed JoWooD's products in Austria and Central Europe. On the same day, JoWooD and Dynamic signed a three-year strategic alliance with French publisher Infogrames, where the company would exclusively distribute JoWooD's titles in Germany, France and Benelux territories while JoWooD and Dynamic would exclusively distribute Infogrames' titles in Austria. In May, JoWooD purchased German distributor Leisuresoft from Infogrames, which was acquired in the latter's purchase of Hasbro Interactive earlier in the year but wasn't needed by Infogrames, which already had a German distribution unit. In August, the company secured a distribution deal with Disney Interactive to distribute their PC titles in German-speaking territories.

JoWooD suffered from heavy financial losses at the beginning of 2002 and was almost close to filing for insolvency. In May 2002, JoWooD announced the acquisition of Ravensburger Interactive Media and its core publishing label Fishtank Interactive from Ravensburger AG. With these acquisitions, JoWooD became the largest German video game company and would allow the publisher to enter the family-friendly market.

For 2003, JoWooD announced that they would pull out of the in-house distribution and sales business. They would sell Dynamic Systems to Koch Media in August. With this deal, Koch secured exclusive distribution rights to JoWooD products in Austria. Earlier in January, JoWooD entered into a deal with Encore Software to distribute nine of JoWooD's titles in North America.

On 8 April 2004, they expanded their distribution agreement with Koch to include Germany, Switzerland, Italy and the United Kingdom.

In January 2005, JoWooD exited the game development industry and shuttered all of their in-house studios. JoWooD Ebensee and Wings Simulations closed in January and Massive Development followed suit in May. In May, JoWooD signed a distribution deal with Nobilis for distribution of titles in Spain and Portugal. In August, they attempted to end their development agreement with developer Perception Pty because of a lack of quality on their "Stargate SG-1" product. JoWooD carried out this action believing they owned the licence for the game Stargate SG-1: The Alliance, which was disputed by Perception. In October, they once again extended their distribution deal with Koch Media to include co-publication of select JoWooD titles under the Deep Silver label.

=== Acquisition of DreamCatcher Games, formation of the JoWooD Group, and Insolvency (2006-2011) ===
On 4 November 2006, JoWooD announced the acquisition of DreamCatcher Games, in efforts to move to the North American game markets.

Throughout 2006-2007, JoWooD entered into several physical distribution agreements. In December 2006, Eidos Interactive secured the rights to distribute JoWooD titles in France, Spain and Benelux territories, while in January 2007, Pinnacle Software secured distribution rights in the United Kingdom. In August 2007, the JoWooD Group formed a budget casual game label named GS-Line.

In October 2009, JoWooD changed its name from JoWooD Productions Software AG to JoWooD Entertainment AG. At the same time, JoWood also announced an agreement with Valve to make available future JoWooD titles on Steam. It owned five subsidiaries in the last years: DreamCatcher Interactive, JoWooD Distribution Services, JoWooD Deutschland, JoWooD Iberica and Quantic Lab.

In May 2010, JoWooD entered into a deal with HMH to distribute and publish the Playmobil Interactive line of products globally except in Germany, while in the US they would be released by DreamCatcher.

On 7 January 2011, JoWooD officially filed for bankruptcy and announced that the company would prepare for "a procedure of capital reorganization". However, on 21 April 2011, JoWooD announced that, unable to negotiate with potential investors, they were officially facing bankruptcy proceedings and had withdrawn their application for a recapitalization plan. In June 2011, JoWooD Entertainment, all their assets and its subsidiary, Quantic Lab, was acquired by Nordic Games. From this point on, JoWooD was no longer operating. All activities of the two companies were taken over by Nordic Games. On 16 August 2011, Nordic Games announced that it had acquired JoWooD's products and brands and some of the companies labels, including The Adventure Company. Following the acquisition, it was announced that JoWood and the Adventure Company would become publishing labels for Nordic Games, a wholly owned subsidiary of Nordic Games Holding.

== Games published ==
Release date	Title	Platform(s)	Developer(s)
14 April 1998	Industry Giant	Microsoft Windows	JoWooD Productions
11 May 1999	Alien Nations	Microsoft Windows	Neo Software
26 October 1999	Panzer Elite	Microsoft Windows	Wings Simulations
2000	Keep the Balance	Microsoft Windows	Item Multimedia
1 December 2000	Thandor: The Invasion	Microsoft Windows	Innonics
28 February 2001	Traffic Giant	Microsoft Windows	JoWooD Productions
15 June 2001	The Nations	Microsoft Windows	JoWooD Vienna
1 July 2001	The Sting!	Microsoft Windows	Neo Software
9 October 2001	Zax: The Alien Hunter	Microsoft Windows	Reflexive Entertainment
25 October 2001	S.W.I.N.E.	Microsoft Windows	StormRegion
20 November 2001	Rally Trophy	Microsoft Windows	Bugbear Entertainment
30 November 2001	AquaNox	Microsoft Windows	Massive Development
26 November 2001	Gorasul: The Legacy of the Dragon	Microsoft Windows	Silver Style
7 June 2002	Hard Truck 2: King of the Road	Microsoft Windows	SoftLab-NSK
28 June 2002	Arx Fatalis	Microsoft Windows	Arkane Studios
23 December 2003	Arx Fatalis	Xbox	Wizarbox
26 August 2002	Cultures 2: The Gates of Asgard	Microsoft Windows	Funatics Development GmbH
18 September 2002	Michael Schumacher Racing World Kart 2002	Microsoft Windows	Radon Labs
18 September 2002	Michael Schumacher Racing World Kart 2002	PlayStation	Radon Labs
23 September 2002	Pusher	Microsoft Windows	JoWood Productions Software AG
30 September 2002	Industry Giant II	Microsoft Windows	JoWooD Productions
10 October 2002	Beam Breakers	Microsoft Windows	Similis Software GmbH
18 October 2002	Archangel	Microsoft Windows	Metropolis Software
25 October 2002	Europa 1400: The Guild	Microsoft Windows	4HEAD Studios
16 November 2002	The Nations Nations Gold Edition / The Nations 2	Microsoft Windows	JoWooD Productions
29 November 2002	Gothic II	Microsoft Windows	Piranha Bytes
10 December 2002	K-Hawk: Survival Instinct	Microsoft Windows	Similis Software GmbH
13 April 2003	Cold Zero: The Last Stand	Microsoft Windows	JoWooD Productions
20 June 2003	Neighbours from Hell	Microsoft Windows	JoWooD Vienna
4 March 2005	Neighbours from Hell	GameCube, Xbox	JoWooD Vienna
2003	Itch!	Microsoft Windows	JoWooD Vienna
22 August 2003	Gothic II: Night of the Raven - Expansion Pack	Microsoft Windows	Piranha Bytes
22 August 2003	AquaNox 2: Revelation	Microsoft Windows	Massive Development
30 August 2003	Chaser	Microsoft Windows	Cauldron
22 October 2003	Cold Zero: No Mercy	Microsoft Windows	JoWooD Productions
29 October 2003	Railroad Pioneer	Microsoft Windows	Kritzelkratz 3000
31 October 2003	Silent Storm	Microsoft Windows	Nival Interactive
28 November 2003	SpellForce: The Order of Dawn	Microsoft Windows	Phenomic Game Development
27 May 2004	Söldner: Secret Wars	Microsoft Windows	Wings Simulations
8 June 2004	Transport Giant	Microsoft Windows	JoWooD Productions
24 June 2004	SpellForce: The Breath of Winter - Expansion Pack	Microsoft Windows	Phenomic Game Development
November 2004	SpellForce: Shadow of the Phoenix - Expansion Pack	Microsoft Windows	Phenomic Game Development
11 November 2004	Söldner: Secret Wars Reloaded	Microsoft Windows	Wings Simulations
25 February 2005	Söldner: Marine Corps - Expansion Pack	Microsoft Windows	Wings Simulations
27 March 2006	Neighbours from Hell 2: On Vacation	Microsoft Windows	JoWooD Vienna
2 March 2005	Legend of Kay	PlayStation 2	Neon Studios; Kaiko
20 April 2006	SpellForce 2: Shadow Wars	Microsoft Windows	Phenomic Game Development
29 September 2006	The Guild 2	Microsoft Windows	4HEAD Studios
13 October 2006	Gothic 3	Microsoft Windows	Piranha Bytes
30 March 2007	Freak Out: Extreme Freeride	PlayStation 2	ColdWood Interactive
28 August 2007	Freak Out: Extreme Freeride	Microsoft Windows	ColdWood Interactive
14 May 2007	SpellForce 2: Dragon Storm	Microsoft Windows	Phenomic Game Development
18 May 2007	The Guild 2 - Pirates of The European Sea - Stand-alone expansion pack	Microsoft Windows	4HEAD Studios
5 June 2007	Space Force: Rogue Universe	Microsoft Windows	Provox Games
15 October 2007	SpellForce Universe Edition - Collection pack	Microsoft Windows	EA Phenomic
15 October 2007	Gothic Universe Edition - Collection pack	Microsoft Windows	DreamCatcher Interactive
30 October 2007	Painkiller: Overdose	Microsoft Windows	Mindware Studios
15 January 2008	Gothic 3: The Beginning	Microsoft Windows	Handy-Games GmbH
28 March 2008	The Golden Horde	Microsoft Windows	World Forge
8 July 2008	Painkiller Universe - Collection Pack	Microsoft Windows	DreamCatcher Interactive
7 October 2008	The Guild 2 - Venice - Stand-alone Expansion Pack	Microsoft Windows	Trine Games
21 November 2008	Gothic 3: Forsaken Gods - Expansion Pack	Microsoft Windows	Trine Games; Mad Vulture Games
27 October 2009	Painkiller: Resurrection	Microsoft Windows	HomeGrown Games
27 November 2009	Yoga Wii	Wii	Trine Games
9 April 2010	Torchlight	Microsoft Windows	Runic Games
12 October 2010	Arcania: Gothic 4	Microsoft Windows	Spellbound Entertainment
12 October 2010	Arcania: Gothic 4	Xbox 360	Black Forest Games
September 2011	Arcania: Gothic 4	PlayStation 3	Black Forest Games
19 October 2010	The Guild 2 - Renaissance - Stand-alone expanded edition	Microsoft Windows	4HEAD Studios
25 February 2011	Painkiller: Redemption	Microsoft Windows	DreamCatcher Interactive
