= Car Tycoon =

2003 video game

- Developer: Vectorcom Development
- Publisher: JoWooD Productions
- Platform: Windows 95/98/ME/2000
- Release: January 5, 2003 (US)
- Genre: Business simulation game
- Mode: Single-player

Car Tycoon is a business simulation game that was released on January 5, 2003, by JoWooD Productions under the Fishtank Interactive brand name. It was the first major game by the developer, German studio Vectorcom Development, and sees the player managing a company that develops and manufactures cars.

== Bugs ==
The game was plagued by bugs from the start. Initially, the player could not save games. Eventually a patch was released that fixed this and a few other bugs, but the game still wasn't entirely bug-free. Numerous bugs were never addressed, such as one related to the "big customers". In the game, the player is able to make offers to various local businesses requiring vehicles. The premise is to give the player another way to sell his or her cars. Unfortunately, this never works, as the offers are never accepted. As for the scenario style play, the scenario number 9: Eliminate your largest competitor, was broken. This meant that the user could never finish that scenario and the rest of the 11 scenarios were locked forever. Hence, only 9 of the 20 scenarios released were ever playable. Another bug was when the user bought multiple factories in certain game maps. Many factories, which were expensive and bought for loans, never started production. This led to a steep fall in revenues and increase in loan liabilities of the company.

== Reception ==
Reception

Aggregate score
Aggregator	Score
Metacritic	46/100

Review scores
Publication	Score
GameSpot	5.1/10
GameSpy	45/100
IGN	4.2/10

Metacritic, which uses a weighted average, assigned the game a score of 46 out of 100, based on 6 critics, indicating a "Generally Unfavorable" reception.

== See also ==
- Detroit, a 1993 computer game about auto manufacturing.
