= Soldner =

Soldner can refer to:

- Johann Georg von Soldner
  - Soldner constant
- Paul Soldner
- Söldner: Secret Wars
