= The Guild 1 Remake: Europa 1410 =

- Developer: Ashborne Games
- Publisher: THQ Nordic
- Engine: Unreal Engine 5
- Platform: Windows
- Release: Early access; September 17, 2026
- Genre: Simulation
- Modes: Single-player, multiplayer

The Guild 1 Remake: Europa 1410 is a computer game currently in development by the Czech studio Ashborne Games. The medieval life, economic, and political simulation was released in September 2026 as an Early access-title by THQ Nordic for Microsoft Windows systems.

The game may be released for consoles at a later date.

== Setting and gameplay ==
The goal and content of the game is the establishment of an influential dynasty. The focus is on rising from humble beginnings. Players start with a small business in trade, crafts (as a blacksmith, stonemason, or tailor), farming, alchemy, or petty crime. To work their way up to becoming a wealthy magnate or influential city leader, and to assert power and influence with and against other family dynasties, players must not only manage their finances skillfully, but also make decisions in their personal lives, cultivate social relationships, and overcome political challenges. Family planning is crucial to ensure the game doesn't end with the death of the first player character, as only with an heir that did not die from childhood illnesses can The Guild – Europa 1410 continue after the death of the first player character. Unlike The Guild 2, which was told from a third-person perspective, the game is controlled from an isometric and a top-down perspective.

The Guild 1 Remake: Europa 1410 can be played in multiplayer mode with up to 12 players.

== Background and development ==
Europa 1400: The Guild (released in 2002) and The Guild 2 (released in 2006) were popular and relatively successful. The browser game Guild 1400, which ran from 2009 to 2012, did not meet expectations. In 2014, a sequel, The Guild 3, was announced for 2017. However, the game was not released until 2022 and was unsuccessful. After the third installment of the series was plagued by numerous bugs and technical problems, THQ Nordic decided to produce a reboot of the series under the title The Guild – Europa 1410. Development began after Ashborne Games completed the real-time strategy game Last Train Home (released in 2023) and assisted Warhorse Studios in the development of the medieval role-playing game Kingdom Come: Deliverance II. Ashborne Games used the first installment of the series from 2002 as a particular source of inspiration.

The game, which is based on Unreal Engine 5, was first revealed in August 2025 with a short film/live-action trailer. It is scheduled for release on PC in 2026. A console port of the game may be developed after the PC release (as of August 2025).

Ashborne Games provided regular updates on the game's development via Steam. In June 2026, the publisher and developer announced that a demo of the game would be released later that same month and that the game would launch via Early access the following month. In July 2026, THQ Nordic announced that the Early Access release would be postponed to September of the same year, to give Ashborne Games sufficient time to respond to feedback on the demo and incorporate it into the game's development prior to launch.

In August 2026, Ashborne Games and THQ Nordic announced that they will be changing the title of the game to The Guild 1 Remake: Europa 1410 to "better communicate its connection to Europa 1400: The Guild." They also announced that the game will launch in Early access on September 17, 2026.
