= Panzer Elite =

1999 video game

- Cover art
- Developer: Wings Simulations
- Publishers: Psygnosis; JoWooD Productions
- Platform: Windows
- Release: NA: October 26, 1999; EU: 1999
- Genre: Vehicle simulation game

Panzer Elite is a World War II tank simulation game in which the player controls a platoon of 4 or 5 tanks on either the German or American side. The game was developed by Wings Simulation for the Microsoft Windows platform, and was first published by Wing's parent company Psygnosis in 1999.

== Reception ==
Reception

Aggregate score
Aggregator	Score
GameRankings	79%

Review scores
Publication	Score
AllGame	4.5/5
Computer Gaming World	3.5/5
GamePro	4/5
GameSpot	8.1/10
IGN	5.3/10
PC Gamer (UK)	66%

The game received "favorable" reviews according to the review aggregation website GameRankings.

=== Awards ===
Panzer Elite was a finalist for Computer Games Strategy Plus's 1999 "Simulation Game of the Year" award, which ultimately went to MiG Alley. The editors called Panzer Elite "one of the most well-rounded tank simulations in recent history."
