= Alien Nations =

1999 video game

- Developer: Neo Software
- Publisher: JoWooD Productions
- Composer: Roland Ubl
- Platforms: Windows, Mac OS
- Release: May 11, 1999
- Genre: Real-time strategy

Alien Nations (German: Die Völker) is a real-time strategy video game developed by Neo Software and published by JoWooD Productions for Microsoft Windows in 1999. It was re-released on GOG.com in 2009. A sequel, The Nations, was published in 2001. Alien Nations was a commercial hit in the German market, and ultimately sold close to 1 million units worldwide.

== Gameplay ==
Alien Nations is a real-time strategy game based on building a nation and conquering others. The player may choose from 3 races – the Pimmons, the Amazons and the Sajkhi. In single-player mode, there are three gameplay modes: Introduction, Campaigns, and Never-ending Game.

== Reception ==
=== Sales ===
Alien Nations was a commercial hit in the German market. Der Spiegel's Frank Patalong noted that it was one of the construction and management simulations that "dominated the German sales charts for years", alongside Anno 1602 and the Settlers series. In German-speaking countries, it sold 150,000 units after two months on shelves, according to the game's Russian publisher Snowball Studios. It was also a success in Russia, with sales of 80,000 units by April 2001. Alien Nations ultimately sold "just under a million copies" by 2016, reported Micharl Furtenbach of Red Bull.

=== Critical reviews ===
Oleg Hazhinskiy of Game.EXE gave the game 4.1/5 and noted its strong similarities with The Settlers series. Among differences, he praised the marketing system, but also mentioned lacking combat.

== See also ==
- Video gaming in Germany
