= Barbara Dennerlein =

German jazz organist

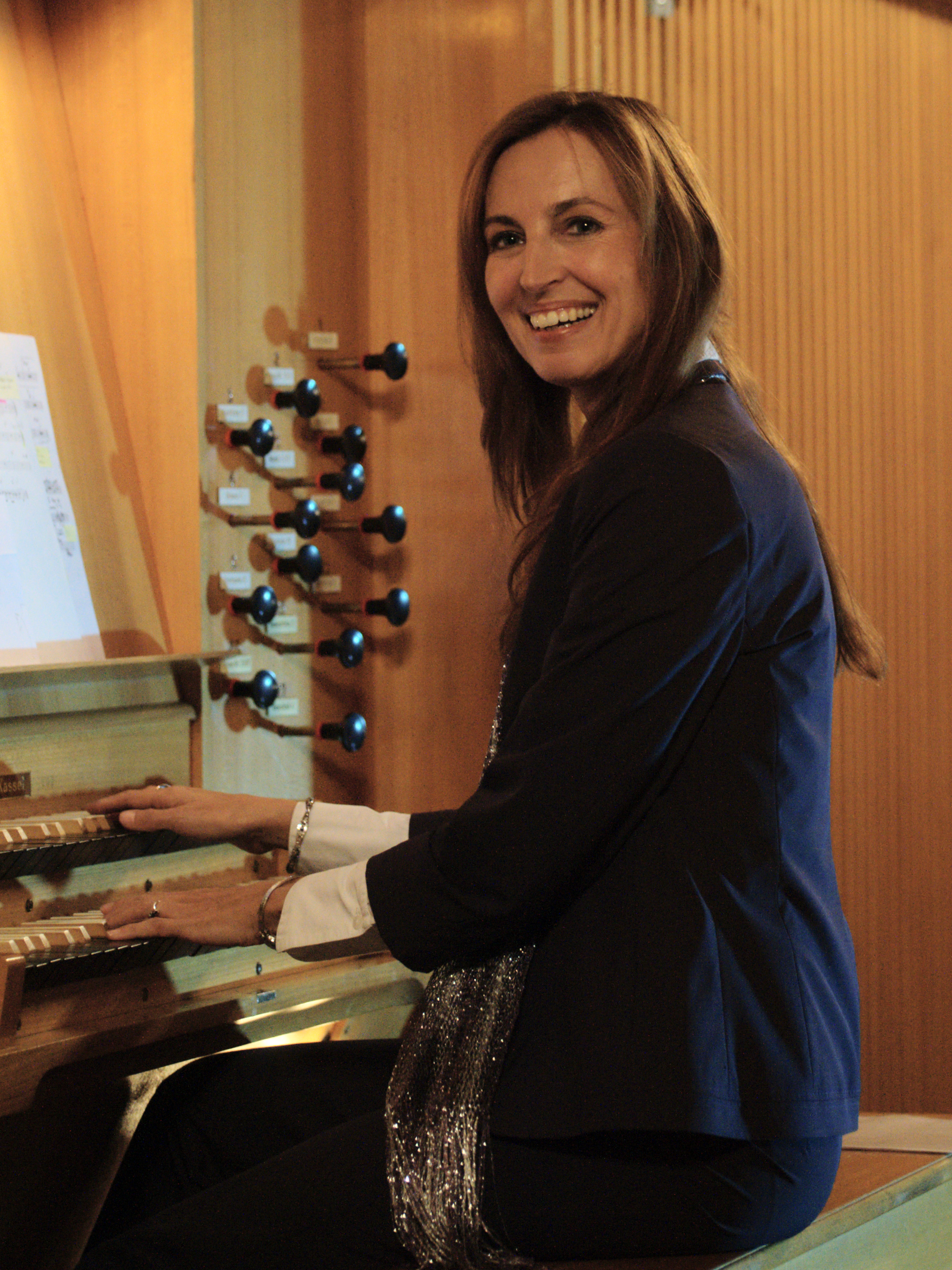
- Barbara Dennerlein performing in 2011

Background information
- Born: 25 September 1964 (age 61); Munich, Germany
- Genres: Jazz
- Occupation: Musician
- Instruments: Electronic organ, synthesizer, organ
- Years active: 1980s–present
- Website: barbaradennerlein.com

Barbara Dennerlein (born 25 September 1964 in Munich) is a German jazz organist. She has achieved critical acclaim for using the bass pedalboard on a Hammond organ and for integrating synthesizer sounds onto the instrument, and was described by critic Ron Wynn as "the most interesting jazz organist to emerge during the 1980s".

== Career ==
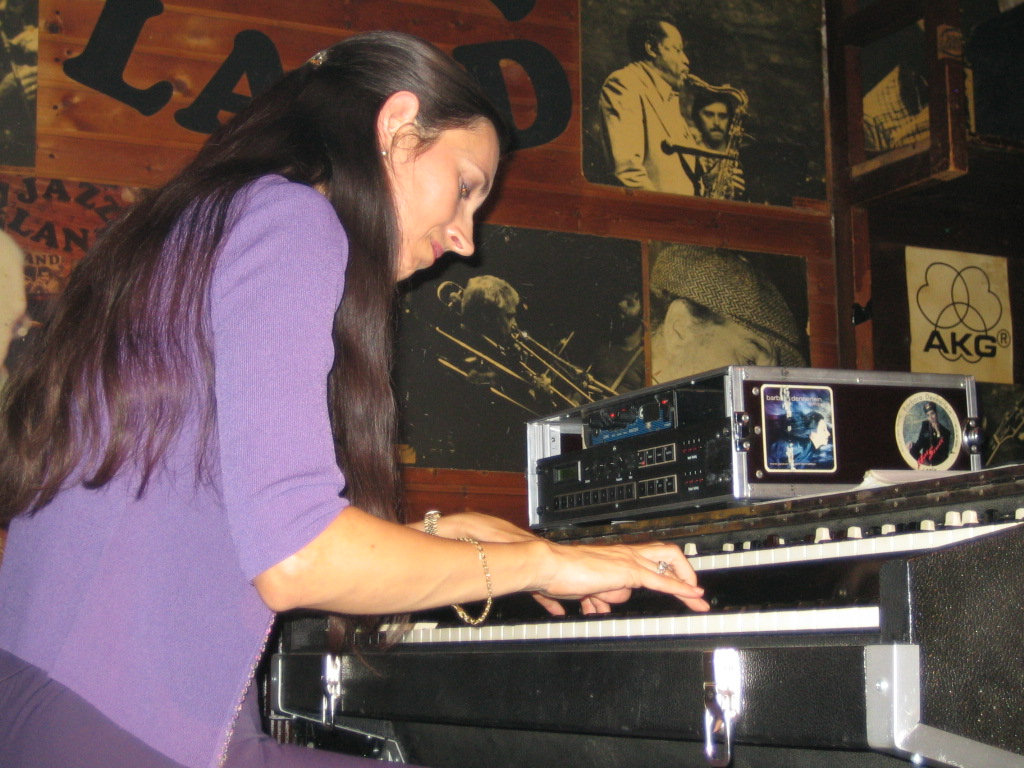
Barbara Dennerlein in Vienna, November 2005

=== Early years ===
Dennerlein was born and grew up in Munich, Germany. She began playing the organ aged 11 after receiving a small Hohner instrument for Christmas. She was encouraged by her grandfather to learn a musical instrument, and her parents were both jazz enthusiasts. She took formal lessons for two years under the instruction of Paul Greisl, who had a Hammond B-3. She immediately became interested in the instrument and that it contained a bass pedalboard, unlike her Hohner. After some searching, since the instrument was then out of production, she acquired her own Hammond aged 13 from her parents.

She began to play concerts aged 14, and the following year, she played in a jazz club for the first time. When leading her own bands, Dennerlein was often the youngest musician in the group, and she learned to co-operate with more experienced musicians. Her local reputation as the "Organ Tornado from Munich" spread after her first television appearances in 1982.

=== Recordings ===
When her third LP Bebab was issued, Dennerlein established her own record label in 1985 and assumed her own management duties, because she felt she did not have enough support from her existing label or from Hammond, who wanted to promote later digital models rather than the B-3 she used. She received two German Record Critics' awards for self-produced albums. Later, she made three recordings for Enja Records and three for Verve Records. On these recordings she worked with Ray Anderson, Randy Brecker, Dennis Chambers, Roy Hargrove, Mitch Watkins, and Jeff "Tain" Watts.

=== Instruments ===
Dennerlein modified a Hammond's pedalboard to trigger samples of an acoustic bass and, impressed with results, decided to modify the manuals to play samplers too. Her performances include solo performances, as well as quintets (e.g. her "Bebab" band). In both, she uses MIDI technology and triggers built into pedals and manuals to trigger synthesizers and samples.

After a variety of projects and after playing with unconventional musicians, such as Friedrich Gulda, Dennerlein started playing the pipe organ in 1994. Since 2003, she has also developed jazz projects with symphonic orchestras, including a collaboration with the Berlin Philharmonic Orchestra on the Karl Schuke organ.

=== Compositions ===
Dennerlein claims to have been primarily influenced by jazz and was not initially interested in classical or church music, although it was and is popular in Germany. She has never been enthusiastic about formal music theory, preferring to learn things through improvisation. However, she has further said that her main influence from jazz is the ability to mix other musical styles as desired, saying "To me, jazz is a synonym for freedom. Freedom from prejudice and discrimination".

Dennerlein's first album included four of her own pieces. Her compositions vary from traditional blues schemes, romantic, melancholic ballads to tempo-driven compositions with elements of swing, bebop, funk and Latin rhythms. The fast tempos and rhythmic figures she uses in her interpretations of well-known standards, and in many of her own compositions, require fast bass pedalboard footwork, though she has used bass players for recordings in order to feature techniques such as slap bass, which cannot be played on pedals. Dennerlein often uses changing meter (e.g., 3/4 to 4/4), as well as unconventional harmonic changes to add expression to her compositions.

== Awards ==
- 1995: "German Record Critics Award" ("Preis der deutschen Schallplattenkritik") for "Take Off"
- 1995: "Jazz Award" for "Take Off" for holding the number one position in the German Jazz Charts for several months and for being best selling Jazz Album of the year in Germany
- 1987: "German Record Critics Award" ("Preis der deutschen Schallplattenkritik") for "Tribute to Charlie".

== Discography ==
- 1983: Jazz Live
- 1984: Orgelspiele
- 1985: Bebab
- 1986: Days of Wine and Roses
- 1987: Tribute to Charlie
- 1988: Barbara Dennerlein Plays Classics
- 1989: Straight Ahead!
- 1989: Live on Tour!
- 1990: Barbara Dennerlein Duo (Bootleg)
- 1991: Hot Stuff and (Friedrich Gulda) Mozart No End
- 1992: That's Me and Solo
- 1995: Take Off!
- 1997: Junkanoo
- 1999: Outhipped
- 2001: Love Letters
- 2002: Spiritual Movement No.1 (church organ recording)
- 2004: In a Silent Mood
- 2005: It's Magic
- 2006: The Best of Barbara Dennerlein compilation
- 2007: Change of Pace (with Philharmonic Orchestra under Bernd Ruf)
- 2008: Spiritual Movement No. 2 (live at Kaiser William Memorial Church in Berlin)
- 2010: Bebabaloo
- 2012: Spiritual Movement No. 3 (live 2008 concert on the Rieger organ at the Stadtpfarrkirche in Fehring, Austria, with guitarist Edi Köhldorfer)
- 2015: Studio Konzert: Barbara Dennerlein (live concert in recording studio, direct to two-track analogue tape) [LP only release]
- 2015: Christmas Soul
- 2016: My Moments (Dennerlein plays Hammond B-E and pipe organ before a live audience, featuring a program of original compositions)
- 2018: Best of Blues: Through the Years compilation
