= Hard Truck 2: King of the Road =

2002 video game

Hard Truck 2: King of the Road (originally Russian: Дальнобойщики 2, lit. 'Hauler 2') is truck driving racing video game developed by SoftLab-NSK and published by 1C Entertainment in 2001. West European version of Hard Truck 2 was released in various European countries by JoWooD Productions on June 7, 2002. It is part of Dalnoboishiki and the Hard Truck series.

== Gameplay ==
The game is an open world truck driving simulator, but less relaxing. The players are racing in the competition for the monopoly of the trucking market. In doing so, the players will have to race with competition from destination to destination all while they have to evade the mafia, drive carefully enough so the police is content, dealing with any road hazards that exist and expanding own business.

== Reception ==
In the United States, Hard Truck 2 sold 210,000 copies and earned $2.1 million by August 2006, after its release in June 2000. It was the century's 100th best-selling computer game during this period.
