= Guild (surname) =

Guild is a surname. Notable people with the surname include:

- Alan Guild (born 1947), Scottish footballer
- Ben Guild (1924-2003), American microbiologist and writer
- Henry Rice Guild (1928–2019), American lawyer
- Ken Guild, Scottish politician
- Nicholas Guild, American writer
- Nigel Guild (born 1949), British Royal Navy admiral
- Shirin Guild (born 1946), British Iranian fashion designer
- Tricia Guild (born 1946), British designer
- William L. Guild (1910–1993), American lawyer and jurist
