= The Nations =

2001 video game

- Developer: JoWooD Vienna
- Publisher: JoWooD Productions
- Platform: Windows
- Release: June 2001
- Genre: Real-time strategy

The Nations (German: Die Völker 2: Aufstieg zum Königreich) is a real-time strategy video game developed and published by Austrian company JoWooD Productions for Microsoft Windows in 2001. It is a sequel to the 1999 game Alien Nations (German: Die Völker).

== Story ==
Consistent with Alien Nations, The Nations features on three alien factions, the alien-like Pimmons, the human-like Amazones, and the bug-like Sajikis on the planet Lukkat. The story of The Nations follows the rebellion of a Pimmon named Korn who creates unrest when making a prophecy that a divine prophet will arrive to revolutionise life on Lukkat. Life turns to chaos as each faction competes in being seen as the most important race of beings on the planet.

== Gameplay ==
Similar to Alien Nations, The Nations is a real-time strategy with an emphasis on resource management and building a tribe from one of three competing races. The player is required to manage the needs of the units in the tribe through a series of resource and production chains that differ depending on the tribe selected. The game also allows the player to pursue victory through multiple approaches, including military conquest, or uniting tribes and nations through diplomacy.

The Nations features a number of differences from Alien Nations. The key innovation of the game is that units exist independently, with their own names and personalities. These units can now move independently and make decisions on their own, although the player may indirectly steer the units to certain priorities. Other innovations in the game include merchants, trade of various goods, production chains, and new options for military conquest and diplomacy.

== Release ==
The Nations was released internationally in June 2001 by JoWooD Productions in Germany, the United States and United Kingdom. Localisation for a Russian version of The Nations was released by Snowball Interactive in October 2001.

=== The Nations: Bonus Pack ===
On 23 November 2001, developers released for download a Bonus Pack for The Nations. The Bonus Pack contained several additional features to the game, including 22 new missions, a new story, more music and video sequences, a new research system, bandits, and tweaks to game mechanics involving trade, production chains and unit strength, to make the game more balanced.

=== The Nations: Gold Edition ===
A revised retail version of the game titled The Nations: Gold Edition was released on February 15, 2002. This version contained the improvements contained in the Bonus Pack, as well as a mission editor and other tools.

== Reception ==
Reception

Review scores
Publication	Score
4Players	80%
Computer Gaming World	2.5/5
GameSpot	6.4
PC Games (DE)	77%
PC PowerPlay	70%
PC Zone	65%

English reviews for The Nations were lukewarm, with praise for the theme and presentation. Reviewers for PC PowerPlay noted "the overall design ethic of the game is wonderful", and "smooth animation, bright colours and amusing design combine to make a visually splendid game". Mark Asher of Computer Gaming World similarly observed "the well-drawn graphics engage with the whimsy of storybook art, so there's plenty of pleasure to be had in just observing."

Reception of the mechanics of unit personalities was mixed. Keith Pullin of PC Zone stated "it's surprising how much you genuinely care about what happens to this utterly bizarre collection of creatures." Bruce Geryk of GameSpot found the mechanics shallow, noting "it really amounts to absolutely no personality at all...all the units do basically the same things (and) they look and sound the same as well. This completely undermines the illusion of individuality of the citizens."

Overall, many reviewers found the game mechanics did not cohesively work well. Mark Asher of Computer Gaming World stated "at times you may feel a bit besieged by how much you need to manage". Daniel Wilks of PC Powerplay critiqued the gameplay as "repetitive and leaves a lot to be desired", with the tutorial "(proving) to be one of the most singularly uninformative pieces of training in recent memory" and the pace being "seriously, detrimentally slow".
