= Thandor: The Invasion =

2000 video game

- Developer(s): Innonics
- Publisher(s): World: JoWooD Productions; Buka Entertainment
- Platform(s): Microsoft Windows
- Release: WW: December 1, 2000
- Genre(s): Real-time strategy
- Mode(s): Multiplayer, Singleplayer

Thandor: The Invasion (German: Thandor: Die Invasion) is a real-time strategy video game, which was developed by Innonics and published by JoWooD Productions on December 1, 2000 released on Microsoft Windows.

It was met with negative reception. The graphics was measured as good, but resource-consuming. Many complaints caused by units behavioral model. Developers of game and critics says that storyline is present, but is not interesting (developers wanted to focus on gameplay).

== Plot ==
Before starting company you can choose the difficulty, but you choose not the "smartness" of AI, but only power of enemy's units in comparense to your units.

== Reception ==
Reception

Aggregate score
Aggregator	Score
GameRankings	52,86 %

Review scores
Publication	Score
GameSpot	4,7 из 10
IGN	4,8 из 10
