= Keep the Balance =

2000 video game

Keep The Balance
- Developers: Item Multimedia (PC); Karma Studios (GBC)
- Publisher: JoWooD Productions
- Platforms: Windows, Game Boy Color
- Release: EU: 2000 (PC); EU: 26 October 2001 (GBC)
- Genre: Puzzle
- Mode: Single-player

Keep The Balance is a video game published by JoWooD Productions and developed by Item Multimedia for Windows in 2000 and Karma Studios for the Game Boy Color in 2001. The game is a puzzle game requiring players to balance objects on a pair of scales.

== Gameplay ==
A screenshot of gameplay in the Windows version

Keep the Balance is a puzzle game in which players are required to balance objects on a pair of scales whilst keeping the weight level. The objects are varied and interact with one another in unpredictable ways, such as circus animals that eat the others when placed together, or fans and vacuum cleaners that move objects towards or away from their side of the scale. The game is won when the scales are perfectly balanced, or lost if the scales reach a certain level of imbalance. An unexpected element is the Joker, who will randomly jump onto the scales to disrupt the balance or insert a random object onto the scales.

The Windows version of the game features two modes, with 'Single Player' mode featuring traditional level-based gameplay and a competitive 'Hot Seat' mode allowing two players to alternate turns to attempt to topple the scales of the other player. The Game Boy Color features a simplified version of the scales, with 80 levels in its single-player mode.

== Reception ==
Reception

Review scores
| Publication | Score | |
| Publication | GBC | PC |
|---|---|---|
| Jeuxvideo.com | 12/20 | |
| PC Games (DE) | | 25% |
| Game Boy Xtreme | 8% | |
| Total Game Boy | 69% | |

Keep the Balance received mixed reviews. Faith Wardle of PC World praised the "bizarre and incredibly detailed animation" for the Windows version of the game, whilst observing "the game can be quite slow in the earlier stages, and with ten levels in each zone it may become tedious." Writing for Game Boy Xtreme, Jamie Wilks found the Game Boy Color version to be "one of the worst games I've ever played", stating the game was "slow", "plain dull", and that the "graphics move from one shade of brown to the next". A more forgiving review from Total Game Boy stated that the game "actually get quite addictive", whilst noting that most of the 80 levels "only last about two seconds each."
