= Bernd Ruf =

German conductor and clarinettist

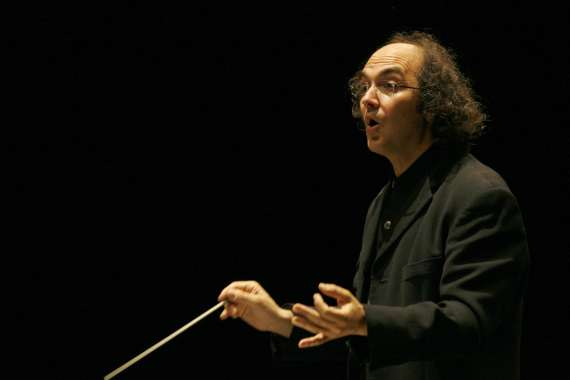
Bernd Ruf (2008)

Bernd Ruf (born 27 September 1964 in Offenburg) is a German conductor and clarinettist. In 2004, Ruf was appointed a new professorship in popular music, jazz, and world music at the Lübeck University of Music.

== Life and works ==
Bernd Ruf grew up in Gengenbach, Baden-Württemberg in a musical environment of classical and popular music. During his final two years of school he attended a two-year extracurricular conducting course. After his Abitur, he studied school music, diploma in music education, jazz and popular music, music director and musicology in Stuttgart and Frankfurt. Following his musical director degree, Bernd Ruf conducted musicals (Miss Saigon, Les Misérables, Dance of the Vampires, Disney's Beauty and the Beast, The Lion King), assisted Dennis Russell Davies at the Stuttgart Chamber Orchestra and at the Salzburg Festival, and undertook the conception and direction of youth concerts at the Stuttgarter Philharmoniker from 1999 to 2004.

As a freelance director, he developed the Crossover Symphony series: orchestral programs with African, Asian, and Latin American musicians in cooperation with jazz and rock musicians. He has conducted several premieres in Stuttgart with the Stuttgart Chamber Orchestra and in New York with the German-American Chamber Orchestra for composer and violinist Gregor Hübner. He has appeared as a guest with SWR Rundfunkorchester Kaiserslautern, the NDR Radiophilharmonie Hanover, and the Bochumer Symphoniker.

Ruf is a guest conductor with the Staatskapelle Halle, the Jenaer Philharmonie, and the Württembergische Philharmonie Reutlingen. He has worked with Jon Lord, Roger Hodgson, Ian Anderson, Paul McCartney, Randy Brecker, Joe Lovano, and Charlie Mariano on his orchestral crossover projects. He is responsible for organizing and conducting the annual open-air event Bridges to the Classics at the Handel Festival in Halle. He has led the German Pops Orchestra and the European Art Orchestra as music director since 1999. Both orchestras have made an international name for themselves with their studio recordings and regularly perform classical, crossover, film, and pop productions for international record labels. He conducts orchestral soundtracks for cinema, television, and games (The Settlers, Anno, SpellForce, Paraworld, Battleforge, Darksiders, House of the Lion).

As a clarinettist he draws on influences from klezmer, jazz, southeastern European folk music, and classical music. Improvisation is a major part of his music. In 1987 Ruf joined the ensemble Tango Five (de), which was founded two years previously in Ravensburg. The members of this ensemble have remained constant since 1995: Gregor Hübner (violin), Veit Hübner (double bass), Karl Albrecht Fischer (piano), and Bernd Ruf (clarinet). Numerous tours have taken the ensemble as far afield as the United States, South America, Georgia, and throughout Europe. On one hand, Tango Five plays scenic musical comedy programs in which four musicians tell short, ironic stories using different instruments and a cappella vocals to bridge musical genres. On the other hand, Tango Five plays a repertoire with its roots in southeastern European folk music, klezmer, gypsy, tango, classical music, and jazz.

The cooperation between Tango Five and bandoneonist Raul Jaurena began in 1998 with the album Obsecion. Appearances at tango festivals in Montevideo and Buenos Aires followed. One year later Bernd Ruf wrote and conducted his first Crossover Symphony for the ORF Radio-Symphonie Orchester of Vienna: Latin Symphony in which Jaurena gave his debut performance with a European orchestra as bandoneon soloist. Other tours followed, the Symphonic Tango Night with the Stuttgart Philharmonic Orchestra (de) and the tango evening 'Amando a Buenos Aires', which was performed for several weeks in Stuttgart's Friedrichsbau. Furthermore, Bernd Ruf and Raul Jaurena have performed as a duo under the name JAURENA RUF Project since 2007.

Since 2004 Ruf has headed the field of popular music, jazz, and world music at the Lübeck Academy of Music, of which he became vice president in May 2011. There he developed the 'Lübeck model', in which jazz and pop are not taught as an independent degree course, but rather as an integral component of classical degree courses. During the 2006 winter semester he temporarily took over the running of the Institute of School Music; since the 2008 winter semester he is now acting head of this institute.

== Awards and honors ==
- 1991: Ravensburger Kupferle (cabaret award) for Tango Five
- 1992: Kleinkunstpreis Baden-Württemberg (3rd place) for Tango Five
- 1995: Scholarship from the Herbert von Karajan Foundation
- 1999: Scholarship from Kunststiftung Baden-Württemberg
- 2002: Grammy nomination as a conductor in the Best Classical Crossover Album category for the album Paquito D'Rivera – The Clarinettist

== Discography ==
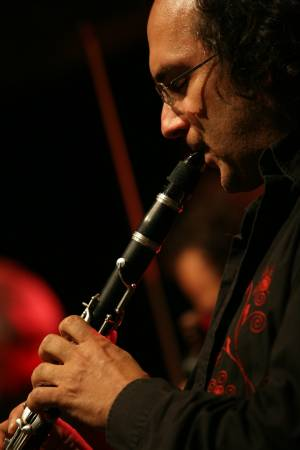
Bernd Ruf (2009) / Photographer: Béla Markó

Year	Format	Title	Artist
1991	CD	Badewasser	Tango Five
1993	CD	Lila Kuh	Tango 5
1994	CD	Tango Five live	Tango Five
1996	CD	Der 5. Mann	Tango Five
1998	CD	Huhn Madagaskar	Tango Five
1998	CD	Obsecion	Raul Jaurena, bandoneon; Tango Five (Bernd Ruf, clarinet; Veit Hübner, double bass; Gregor Hübner, violin; Karl Albrecht Fischer, piano)
1998	CD	New York Stories	Richie Beirach, piano; Gregor Hübner, violin; Richard Brice, viola; Philharmonia Virtuosi New York; Bernd Ruf, conductor
2000	CD	Tango Five spielt wie Waldi	Tango Five
2000	CD	Symphonic Tango Night	Raul Jaurena, bandoneon; Marga Mitchell, vocals; Tango Five (Bernd Ruf, clarinet & conductor; Veit Hübner, double bass; Gregor Hübner, violin; Karl Albrecht Fischer, piano); Stuttgarter Philharmoniker
2001	CD	Amando a Buenos Aires	Raul Jaurena, bandoneon; Marga Mitchell, vocals; Tango Five (Bernd Ruf, clarinet; Veit Hübner, double bass; Gregor Hübner, violin; Karl Albrecht Fischer, piano)
2001	CD	Kakyoku	Fumio Yasuda, piano; Ernst Reijseger, cello; European Art Orchestra; Bernd Ruf, conductor
2001	CD	Paquito D'Rivera - The Clarinetist	Paquito D'Rivera, clarinet; GermanPops Orchestra, European Art Orchestra, conductor: Pablo Zinger, Bernd Ruf
2003	CD	Go For Gold	Tango Five
2004	CD	europique music	Raul Jaurena, bandoneon; Tango Five (Bernd Ruf, clarinet; Veit Hübner, double bass; Gregor Hübner, violin; Karl Albrecht Fischer, piano)
2004	CD / DVD	Pur Klassisch - Live auf Schalke 2004	Pur; Fools Garden; Heinz Rudolf Kunze; German Pops Orchestra; Bernd Ruf, conductor
2004	CD	In die Tiefe der Zeit	Ulrich Schlumberger, accordion; Krassimira Krasteva, cello; Stuttgarter Philharmoniker; Bernd Ruf, conductor
2005	CD	Heavenly Blue	Fumio Yasuda, piano; Teodoro Anzellotti, accordion; Kammerorchester Basel; Bernd Ruf, conductor
2006	DVD	Best of Tango Five	Tango Five
2006	CD	Las Vegas Rhapsody	Theo Bleckmann, vocals; Kammerorchester Basel; Bernd Ruf, conductor
2007	DVD	Pur & Friends - Live Auf Schalke 2007	Pur; Christina Stürmer; John Miles; GermanPops Orchestra; Bernd Ruf, conductor
2007	CD	Change of Pace	Barbara Dennerlein, organ; Peter Lehel, saxophone; Daniel Messina, drums; Staatsphilharmonie Rheinland-Pfalz; Bernd Ruf, conductor
2007	CD	Anna Margareta - Das Buxtehude-Musical	Lübeck Academy of Music ensemble, band and orchestra; Bernd Ruf, conductor
2008	CD	Musik in Deutschland 1950-2000, Neue Musik im Jazz	Richie Beirach, piano; Gregor Hübner, violin; Philharmonia Virtuosi New York, Bernd Ruf, conductor
2009	CD	Schweitzer - Soundtrack	Staatskapelle Halle; Bernd Ruf, conductor
2010	CD	Tango Tales – para vos y para mÍ	Raul Jaurena, bandoneon; Bernd Ruf, clarinet
2010	CD	African Symphony – Teme	Patrick Bebey, African instruments and voices; Antje Birnbaum, recitation; Bernd Ruf, conductor and saxophone; GermanPops Orchestra
2011	CD	Klaus Doldinger Symphonic Project	Klaus Doldinger; Passport; Staatsphilharmonie Rheinland-Pfalz; Bernd Ruf, conductor

== See also ==
- Australian Brandenburg Orchestra
- Kammerorchester Basel
- Philharmonia Virtuosi
- Sodagreen

== Sources ==
- Literature by and about Bernd Ruf in the German National Library catalogue
- Jazzpages.com
- Portrait about Bernd Ruf in the magazine Scala, Stuttgart 2 / 2001
