= The Guild 2 =

2006 video game

- Developer: 4HEAD Studios
- Publishers: Aspyr; JoWooD Productions; Deep Silver; Game Factory Interactive
- Director: Matti Jäger
- Producer: Ralf C. Adam
- Designer: Heinrich Meyer
- Programmer: Carsten Stolpmann
- Artist: Matthias Kästner
- Composer: Bernd Ruf
- Series: The Guild
- Engine: Gamebryo engine
- Platform: Microsoft Windows
- Release: EU: September 29, 2006; NA: October 12, 2006; AU: November 23, 2006
- Genre: Life simulation
- Mode: Single-player

The Guild 2 (German: Die Gilde 2) is a life simulation video game developed by 4HEAD Studios and published by JoWooD Productions. It is the second installment in The Guild series, following Europa 1400: The Guild and preceding The Guild 3. The game was released worldwide in November 2006 for Windows. Taking place within fictional versions of provinces of Europe in the fifteenth century, The Guild 2's main focus revolves around the player character's aim to simulate life in the Renaissance. At the beginning of the game, the player can create a self defined character, whereby characteristic attributes points and skills can be adjusted and developed over the course of the game, by improving its properties and special abilities.

The Guild 2 was developed using the Gamebryo engine and features open end gameplay. The game was released to average acclaim and earned a nomination for "Best Sound Award".

Three downloadable content (DLC) stand-alone add-ons were released—Pirates of the European Seas, The Guild 2: Venice and The Guild 2: Renaissance—which were repackaged into The Guild: Complete Collection and released in January 2013.

== Gameplay ==
The Guild 2 is a real-time life simulation video game that incorporates nonlinear gameplay, playable from a bird's-eye view, allowing to zoom in and out of the game. The Guild 2 introduces features including construction and management, tactical role-playing and social simulation elements, in which players assumes control of a defined character avatar, to simulate medieval life with characteristic features, role-playing game-style ability scores, classes and special abilities in European cities. It can be played using a mouse and keyboard. Similar to its predecessor, it features character classes and affects what buildings can be constructed and upgraded, which grants access to more improvements and therefore what businesses can be run.

The player's creating a character while picking relevant stats.

Players have the option to develop and create their character at the beginning of the game, benefitting from a variety of customization, during the character creation, by selecting the appearance, first- and surname, class, sex, zodiac sign, religion and spent experience on talents. An objective for players is to improve their character's skills at levelling up, which are numerical representations of their ability in certain areas.

=== Modes ===
The game features an extended single-player campaign, a comprehensive tutorial placed in the 15th century, that has additionally crafted scenario maps with a German Hanse campaign in the cities of Hamburg and Lübeck, Nottinghamshire and Sherwood Forest and Lyon (France).

Available game modes for playing:

- Dynasty mode, in which players can play an open-ended game without a defined objective,
- Extinction sets the goal to eliminate the entire opposing dynasties
- Time Limit, players first selects a time limit and after its expiry, this limit, the points of profit - a comparison representation in the game - compared,
- Pro team a random mission specifies as a game objective, that each team must fulfill a random mission
- All teams with the same mission, where the game objective is to choose an assignment, only the first named one comes with varying objectives and allows to alter some adjustments to the economic, social and political conditions.

Dealing with a medieval legal system, town politics and rivalries between families can range from friendliness to open warfare. All game modes can be played in varying difficulties ranging from easy to hard. The Guild 2 provides online and network play with up to eight people that can playing simultaneously, cooperative and in competitive game modes.

=== Talents and signs ===
The game features talents, including zodiac signs, which grants players a free talent point, depending on the choice of the sign.

=== Titles ===
The house, level of intrigue and position in government, players may obtain depends on the title, obtained by a generous donation in the town hall new titles which confer different benefits. Each title allows to upgrade a hovel by one level and to extend the influence, since both types of upgrades allows, to engage in darker projects, players may even spy on opponents, rob, sabotage competitors business, or let assassinate them. The title progression is linear, beginning with "commoner" and proceeding through "citizen", "patrician", and then to titles of royalty.

With the titles come privileges that allow the character to perform political acts, like applying for public office and owning more businesses. A higher title allows characters to improve and upgrade their homes.

== Plot ==
=== Setting ===
The Guild 2 takes place in the medieval world of the 15th century and begins in European cities like London, Lyon or Berlin. The player chooses where to play. Set in a medieval environment, a setting influenced by England, France and Germany, the game focuses on the common ideas of the centuries between ancient and early modern times, which has been transformed into an astonishingly diverse and evocative view of life.

Especially in the Middle Ages and the transition to the Renaissance in which many important influences, such as entry into politics and the potential associated rise of the civil society, as well as a growing meaning of cities are just as palpable as ubiquitous differences in status between different social strata, reflects the division of the church its entry and a spirit of optimism has been designed by a good development of action combined with a family empire foundation, to compete against players or computer-controlled opponents.

== Development and marketing ==
Development for The Guild 2 began in early 2003 with a team of more than 80 people and was headed by Lars Mertensen, director of Europa 1400: The Guild, which was published in 2002. The game is characterized mainly by the increased importance of the private life of the individual figures and released in September 2006 to largely mixed reception at its launch. The Guild 2 was first announced at the Games Convention in Leipzig, Germany, on August 21, 2003.

After initial logistical delays, the first expansion pack named Pirates of The European Seas was released in May 2007. / This stand alone expansion pack added several features, such as new professions and several different types of ships. This first expansion pack met with slightly better reviews than the original game. GameSpot gave it a "fair" score (6/10), and from Game Watcher a score of 8.2 out of 10. As a result of this, then-Community manager, known only as Fajeth had between the years of 2010–2012 in a fan community forum announced, that he and some of the members of the game's community led by Fajeth, has taken over the flawed game issues and attempted to fix them with an overhaul and updates, that the issues has been adequately addressed.

The Guild 2: Pirates Of The European Seas an add-on, added new features like a hospital and a fishery. On August 31, 2007, The Guild 2 Gold was released, which includes the main game and Pirates of the Seas. All previously published titles in the series, so The Guild and The Guild 2 add-ons with each, were placed under the name of The Guild Universe in July 2008 in the trade. The Guild 2: The Royal Edition appeared on July 25, 2008, and contains The Guild 2, the add-on Pirates of the Seas, new maps and patch 2.1.

A stand-alone expansion for the game called The Guild 2 - Venice developed by Trine Games was released on October 10, 2008. It includes the city of Venice, a new building style, and some minor new features. This expansion, which added the city of Venice to the game world

On August 25, 2014, Nordic Games announced the new patch 4.2 for The Guild 2 Renaissance. It will fix a lot of map bugs, add some scenarios and remaster the audio track for the game, it was released as stand-alone expanded version by Runeforge Game Studio and JoWooD Entertainment on July 27, 2010. During gamescom 2014 Nordic Games announced that they are developing The Guild 3.

=== Engine ===
The Guild 2 is powered by the Gamebryo engine, the speedtree physics engine, the Quazal rendez-vous technology and supports online multiplayer for playing cooperatively or competitively with other players.

=== Audio ===
Die Gilde 2: The Guild 2 Official Soundtrack

Soundtrack album by Pierre Langer
- Released: July 30, 2007
- Recorded: Genuin
- Genre: Video game soundtrack
- Length: 3:18 (Full soundtrack); 72:13 (Disc 1)
- Label: Sonicminds
- Producers: Alexander Röder; Markus Schmidt; Pierre Langer; Tilman Sillescu

The team employed Pierre Langer of Dynamedion, to produce the album music and the sound effects for The Guild 2. The soundtrack was composed and recorded in the Thuringian Philharmonic Gotha-Suhl under the conduction by Bernd Ruf with a symphony orchestra. The German band Versengold has since 2014 musical performances in taverns in the game, with a total of three songs.

== Reception ==
Reception

Aggregate scores
Aggregator	Score
GameRankings	61.78%
Metacritic	61/100

Review scores
Publication	Score
GameSpot	6.2/10
GamesRadar+	3/5
IGN	6.5/10
PALGN	6/10
multiplayer.it	7.9/10
Game Debate	7.0/10
Hooked Gamers	5/10
Game Watcher	6.8/10
Gaming Excellence	5/10
GMC	6.5/10

Award
Publication	Award
	Best Sound Award

Upon release, The Guild 2 received average acclaim from magazines and websites. The game received a 6.2 out of 10 points from GameSpot. Eoghan Brophy of the former gaming website gamers Europe praised the opportunity, that players can gain through accumulated experience in the form of redistributable points and noted that it is beneficial to invest them immediately upon receiving in class-related talents. Stuart Thomas of game debate praises the combination created by modifications made by the modding team in the community around the game, calling it an incredible piece of work, that would pay a little patience as the game progresses in terms of the opening complexity of the game. Ludovica Lagomarsino of Italian reference point multiplayer praised both, the particular system of "favor" for both sentimental and political as well as commercial relationships as useful and also the user interface for its user-friendlyness. GMC's Vincenzo Beretta noted that the "developers try to overcome their receding success" while criticizing that the "results are not entirely the same" continuing with criticizing the user interface "that more problematic than functional" is, but lauded the game's setting as "very lively and fascinating 3D environment".

Despite the praise, Joe Martin of VideoGamer.com gave the game 4 out 10 points focusing on the game's variety to gameplay and lack of focus in its design stages, he noted that it's an rpg game that was "ruined by a lack of focus in its design stages" or had it been a little faster-paced and involving it may have made a mediocre rts game. Game Watcher gave the game 7.1 out of 10. IGN gave it 6.5 out of 10, and Hooked Gamers gave it 5 out of 10.

The Guild 2 Renaissance was awarded the Sound Award by PC Games magazine. It earned nomination for "Best Sound Award".
