= Yoga Wii =

2009 video game

- Developer(s): Trine Games
- Publisher(s): JoWooD Entertainment (PAL); DreamCatcher Interactive (NA)
- Platform(s): Wii
- Release: EU: November 27, 2009; NA: December 1, 2009; AU: January 21, 2010
- Genre(s): Fitness game
- Mode(s): Single-player, multiplayer

Yoga Wii is a fitness video game for the Wii home console, developed by Indian studio Trine Games and published by JoWooD Entertainment. Using the Wii Balance Board, and featuring tips and videos from Polish model Anja Rubik, Yoga guides the subject through 30 yoga positions in a variety of virtual Asian settings using an interactive "Yoga Guru". Positions include the lotus position, tāḍāsana, śavāsana, and naṭarājāsana. Yoga was released November 2009.
