= Michael Schumacher Racing World Kart 2002 =

2002 video game

- Packaging for the PAL region PlayStation version
- Developer: Radon Labs
- Publisher: JoWooD Productions
- Platforms: Windows, PlayStation
- Release: Windows: EU: June 28, 2002; NA: September 18, 2002; PlayStation: EU: November 2, 2002
- Genre: Racing
- Modes: Single-player, multiplayer

Michael Schumacher Racing World Kart 2002 is a racing video game released for PlayStation and Microsoft Windows in 2002, developed by Radon Labs and published by JoWooD Productions.

== Reception ==
IGN gave the Windows version of Michael Schumacher Racing World Kart 2002 a decent 7.0 out of 10 overall despite little criticism saying "There were reports of problems with installation and setup of the game, but it ran fine on the system" they praised the presentation of the game stating "It is easy to use menus and a straight forward manual will help players get in with little fuss".
