= Archimedean Dynasty =

1996 video game

- Developer: Massive Development
- Publisher: Blue Byte Software
- Series: AquaNox
- Platforms: MS-DOS, Windows
- Release: NA: November 16, 1996; EU: November 1996
- Genres: First-person shooter Submarine simulator
- Mode: Single-player

Archimedean Dynasty (German: Schleichfahrt, meaning silent running) is the first of the AquaNox series of video games. It was developed by Massive Development for MS-DOS and published in 1996 by Blue Byte. On July 29, 2015, after years of commercial unavailability, the game was re-released on the digital distributor gog.com with Windows support.

== Gameplay ==
The game splits up into a series of primary and secondary missions, which allow the player to proceed in the storyline as well as earn additional funds. Those 'credits' can then be used to upgrade the various vessels owned by Emerald 'Deadeye' Flint with a huge array of offensive and defensive upgrades, such as additional, and/or more powerful primary weapons, torpedoes and torpedo storage and turret command software, generators, hull plating, Buzzers (technically underwater flares to break a torpedo's lock on the player's ship), noise reduction technology, a booster, and a fixer.

The control of the game is designed for the use of a joystick. The player is confronted with maneuvering through narrow canyons, deep sea currents and enemy fire. They can also use their keyboard; W is forward A is back or brake. Hitting W twice will give the player a boost in acceleration if they have the 'Booster' installed.

== Plot ==
By the middle of the 27th century, Earth has become a desolate wasteland, with surface polluted by the worldwide nuclear war and continents submerged due to the ice caps melting. Humanity was forced to flee into the depths of the ocean. Here, in a world called Aqua, the democratic Atlantic Federation, the oligarchy of the Indo-Arabic Clansunion, the totalitarian monarchist Sino-Russo-Japanese Shogunate in the western Pacific, and the lawless Tornado Zone in the eastern Pacific along the coastline of South America stand as the remnants of a fractured civilization.

The plot develops around a mercenary named Emerald "Deadeye" Flint, who takes up a seemingly simple task to escort a cargo ship, transporting the nearly worthless delivery of sulfur, through quiet waters. Shortly after the beginning of the voyage, the protagonist becomes the sole hostage after an anarchistic group of Shogunate mercenaries raid the convoy. However, he is released by their leader, Hóng Lóng, who is a well-known arch-enemy of, and has formed a love–hate relationship with the protagonist after helping him escape prison.

Emerald "Deadeye" Flint is soon picked up by a freighter and dropped off in Magellan where his first mission is to bring himself and an attache to Emerald's boss, El Topo's base in a rusty old ship named 'Hiob'. After the player completes several missions as repayment to El Topo for the failure of the escort mission, the player is ordered to move to another location to look for a mercenary to assist him in obtaining the black box of the submarine Big Fat Mama.

Eventually the player's ship is replaced by a faster scout called the 'Gator'. As the player continues to progress through the main story line his ship is replaced two more times, first by the slightly sluggish Atlantic Federation bomber 'Zorn', which introduces the player to a ship with significantly greater firepower. Finally the player ends up in a prototype EnTrOx bomber called 'Succubus', which is the fastest and most advanced submarine in Aqua. The Succubus gets confiscated from EnTrOx after their CEO is impeached and the company dissolved to end their monopoly on and control over Aqua's energy, transport, and oxygen resources.

After several other missions, the player encounters a mysterious mothership during a simple recon mission that is traveling at higher speeds than any other submarine in Aqua. As the game progresses, they encounter more and more scouts of similar make, dubbed Bionts, due to the ships being of a bionic build where pilot and machine are fused together. In one mission, the player is required to paralyse a Biont scout (using EMP weapons) and allow the group to analyse the ship. Near the end of the game a great war breaks out between the Bionts and humans. During the war, the player's last mission is to escort Hóng Lóng who sacrifices herself in order to destroy the main control entity of the Bionts called Survion.

== Reception ==
Reception

Review scores
Publication	Score
GameSpot	8.3/10
Next Generation	3/5
PC Multimedia & Entertainment	92%
PC Gamer	84%

Chris Hudak of GameSpot praised the game's open-endedness, also noting that this, combined with the sheer number of tactical options available could be very confusing to some players. PC Multimedia & Entertainment said Archimedean Dynasty "simply oozes perfection in almost every way", applauding the realistic physics and complex graphics of the 3D engine, the detailed storyline and game world, the compelling sound effects, and the strong combat. He cited the lack of a multiplayer mode as the one glaring omission. Next Generation likewise hailed the 3D engine for its realism and beauty, and the storyline for its depth. The reviewer commented, "Rather than feeling like you're just flying around a fishbowl, you really feel like you're underwater, in a single-seated attack submarine."

The game was commercially unsuccessful in the US.

Archimedean Dynasty was nominated as Computer Games Strategy Plus's 1996 "Science-Fiction Simulation" of the year, although it lost to Terra Nova: Strike Force Centauri. In 2000, Computer Games Strategy Plus named Archimedean Dynasty one of the "10 Best Sci-Fi Simulations" of all time.

== Reviews ==
- Computer Gaming World #153 (Apr 1997)
