= Space Force: Rogue Universe =

2007 video game

- Developer(s): Provox Games
- Publisher(s): EU: JoWooD Productions; NA: DreamCatcher Interactive; AU: N3VRF4IL
- Platform(s): Microsoft Windows
- Release: NA: June 5, 2007; EU: June 22, 2007; AU: August 24, 2007
- Genre(s): Space combat simulator

Space Force: Rogue Universe is a space simulation video game developed by Croatian Provox Games. The game was released in North America in 2007 by DreamCatcher Games, and was released in Europe by JoWooD Productions. It was followed by Space Force: Captains.

== Plot ==
The story begins with Jim and Jax Anderson hoping to see the military base where their father was taking off but they were too late. Up in space, their father is talking with a fellow pilot when his ship is destroyed by Union Forces. Years later, Jim and Jax had grown apart. Jim had joined the Earth Military Directorate to find his sister whom he promises to protect.

== Factions ==
Earth Military Directorate In the year 2015, Earth had only the seasons of summer and winter, causing mass migration to USA, Central Asia and Europe. This caused a massive World War in which military technology became more destructive. At the brink of catastrophe, the alien species known as the Ord attacked, killing 1.5 million people at the first strike and another 2 million at the next invasion. The planet's militaries mobilized and joined together, forming the Earth Military Directorate. They recruited boys and girls into their ranks, training them in the combat of history, strategies and tactics. In 2060, driven for revenge for the lost people in the two invasions, the EMD invaded the Ord colonies at the system of Goe and slaughtered every last Ord by 2080. They colonized one of the system's planets as New Terra.

Union Force - A number of humans who felt guilty about what happened in Goe tried to use diplomacy to achieve peace. At the end of the Ord genocide, the leader of the separatist group, Jonathan Hakes formed the Union Force or the UF for short. They gained control of EMD technology, bringing about their new army. However, the EMD sent in an entire fleet to deal with the rebels but they were wiped out by the Yah-na-ra. The UF took advantage of the victory to try to take Earth without success. Unfortunately for them, EMD Chief Commander Thomas Warden arrested any spies on Earth. Looking for allies, the UF made an alliance with the Makkanists for mines but the cyborgs switched sides. The UF then collaborated with pirates to infiltrate the EMD, which is considered unhonourable among the EMD. But the Ord were not pleased that the UF wanted to try peaceful solutions and joined the EMD in exchange for their homelands, which the EMD would never give back. Along with the Yah-na-ra, the UF hoped to bring peace to Earth. However, the war between the two factions lead right up to the mid 25th century.

Ord - The history of the Ord is the bloodiest in all space travel history. In constant wars, the Ord were defending their home, the Nebel system, from a number of hostile species and such events resulted in a merciless and bloodthirsty civilization who believed that fighting is the only option. They then expanded their territory outside of Nebel and to find new opponents, they fought against the Makkanists who were much stronger than they were in technology and strength. The Ord tried continuously to bring down the machines but had no success. They then entered the Solar System and attacked the humans living there when they tried to make peace. Negotiation was the not the way of the Ord and was perceived as cowardice. Several decades later, humanity struck back and killed every last Ord in the productive system of Goe. Centuries later, the Ord worked as mercenaries for the EMD to exterminate the UF in exchange for the return of Goe. However, the Ord were planning to destroy the EMD and Earth, mainly because of their alliance with the Makkanists.

Chulta Olirion- is an exclusevly female society. Legend says the god had two daughters:Nauri and Olirion. This civilization would have been peaceful only if they didn't witnessed in Gods War on their planet. Soon, all male population in the civilization were eliminated as consequence of the Gods Wars, but soon they realised it was a bad idea and now they are working on producing male population.

Makkinist - This race was born from purpose, one civilization, called Rodox where in the wrong place at the wrong time, they got infected with dangerous disease. So they sought cure in replacing organic parts with synthetic parts. Soon other species wanted to join them and Makkinist was born.

Draglon Dominion - Very peaceful and intelligent race always seeking knowledge. They became immortal and because of that ability they are in ruthless war with Collectives, also they had some problems with Yah-na-ra and Makkinsts.

Alreani States -

Ezodar Empire - Ezodar Empire were at first very undeveloped and stupid race, easily conquered and subdued by ancient civilization. But soon, over the effects of their homeland, they became powerful shapeshifters and very intelligent race and drove their conquerors into extinction. Over the course of years, they discovered priceless treasure but guardians of this treasure exiled them and erased their memory.

Yah-An-Ra - Energetic beings, believed to be first advanced civilization and creators of any other new civilization. Diplomatic race ready to enter any negotiations, but their fierce military helped them defend their territory when diplomacy was futile. Their special ability, to appear in many places at the same time, always bothered Collectives and they are involved with them in endless thousand years war.

Collective - Race that was created, evolved and developed under Zergo civilization. In 100 years, Zergon left Collectives and they were angry at them. They sought revenge in eliminating them, but in the process they conflicted with absolutely every race in the universe. After Zergon was defeated, they decided to exterminate any remaining life in the known universe.

Pirates - After refugees from Earth, to escape Ord invasion, inhabited new worlds to survive grow in numbers and reached massive advances in technology, they became mercenary faction, often hired by others to do dirty works. When they do not act as mercenaries, they act as pirates, pillaging and looting colonized words of other races.

== Reception ==
Reception

Aggregate score
Aggregator	Score
Metacritic	62/100

Review scores
Publication	Score
Eurogamer	4/10
GameSpot	7.5/10
GameStar	54%
GameZone	7/10
IGN	5.1/10
Jeuxvideo.com	12/20
PALGN	6.5/10
PC Format	86%
PC Gamer (US)	59%
PC Zone	70%

The game received "mixed" reviews according to the review aggregation website Metacritic. IGN praised the game's "pleasing explosions, striking lighting effects, and generally attractive views of the galaxy", but criticized its "abysmal storyline and anemic characters". Eurogamer said: "Spaceforce can't be recommended despite some interesting ideas."

== See also ==
- Space combat simulator
- Space battle
