= Hot Stuff (Barbara Dennerlein album) =

Studio album by Barbara Dennerlein
- Released: 1991
- Recorded: June 1990
- Genre: Jazz
- Label: Enja
- Producer: Barbara Dennerlein

Barbara Dennerlein chronology
Live on Tour! (1989)	Hot Stuff (1991)	(Friedrich Gulda) Mozart No End (1991)

Hot Stuff is an album by the German keyboardist Barbara Dennerlein, released in 1991. It peaked in the top five on Radio & Records' Contemporary Jazz Albums chart. Dennerlein supported the album with a European tour.

== Production ==
Produced by Dennerlein, the album was recorded in June 1990. She played Hammond organ, synthesizers, and foot pedal bass. She was backed by Mark Mondesir on drums, Andy Sheppard on tenor saxophone, and Mitch Watkins on guitar. Dennerlein wrote seven of the album's songs; she was influenced primarily by Larry Young. "Killer Joe" is a version of the song composed by Benny Golson. "Seven Steps to Heaven" was written by Miles Davis and Victor Feldman.

== Critical reception ==
Professional ratings
Review scores
Source	Rating
All Music Guide to Jazz	4/5 stars
Calgary Herald	C
The Encyclopedia of Popular Music	4/5 stars
MusicHound Jazz: The Essential Album Guide	3.5/5 stars
Omaha World-Herald	3/5 stars
The Penguin Guide to Jazz on CD	3.5/4 stars
The Windsor Star	A

The Salt Lake Tribune stated, "Synthesizer is also Dennerlein's province, creating an airy ambience to highlight not only the driving organ lines but also the Pat Metheny-like guitar touches, some hard-bop sax work and crackling drum rhythms." The Calgary Herald opined that Dennerlein "has speed and energy to burn, which makes for a certain excitement in her playing... But the overall effect is one of restless boredom." The Edmonton Journal noted that the music "is more apt to remind you of Jan Hammer's work with John Abercrombie and others than anything from organ great Jimmy Smith, though the straight-forward approach elicits some swinging steps".

The Windsor Star said that the musicians "contribute equal shares of finesse and excitement, with a European flavor at times similar to ECM recording quality and style." The Globe and Mail concluded that "Dennerlein's compositions tend to be rather convoluted and awkward in their structuring —the Keith Emerson syndrome, perhaps—but they get her away from the old B-3 grind." Of the title track, the Los Angeles Times said that Dennerlein "pumps out extraordinary effects, achieving a new level of dynamic and tonal variety."

== Track listing ==
No.	Title	Length
1.	"Hot Stuff"
2.	"Wow!"
3.	"Top Secret"
4.	"Birthday Blues"
5.	"Polar Lights"
6.	"Killer Joe"
7.	"My Invitation"
8.	"Seven Steps to Heaven"
9.	"Toscanian Sunset"
