= Massive Development =

German video game developer

Massive Development GmbH
- Formerly: Massive Development GbR; (1994-1999)
- Type: Private; (October 1994–13 December 2000); Subsidiary of JoWooD; (14 December 2000 – 30 May 2005)
- Industry: Video games
- Founded: October 1994; 31 years ago
- Defunct: 30 May 2005
- Headquarters: Mannheim, Germany
- Key people: Alexander Jorias; Ingo Frick; Oliver Weirich
- Number of employees: 15 (2005)
- Website: Massive.de (archived)

Massive Development GmbH was a German video game developer based in Mannheim, Germany. Founded as Massive Development GbR, the company was active between 1994 and 2005 and is primarily known for their post-apocalyptic science fiction video games Archimedean Dynasty and AquaNox, which have attained somewhat of a cult status.

== History ==
Massive Development was founded in 1994 by Alexander Jorias, Ingo Frick and Oliver Weirich in Mannheim as Massive Development GbR. Their first product was the porting of the Amiga game The Settlers to MS-DOS in 1994. In 1996 they released the successful science-fiction submarine role-playing video game Archimedean Dynasty, published by Blue Byte.

In December 2000, Massive Development was bought by the Austrian publisher JoWooD. Until 2000, Massive Development worked on its own game engine called "krass Engine", which was used for their next title AquaNox. It was one of the first games to make use of the new capabilities of graphic cards with T&L hardware, which is why AquaNox was also bundled with new graphic cards. On 30 May 2005, the development studio was closed by JoWooD, and by that cancelling the development of AquaNox: The Angel's Tears for the PlayStation 2.

Two of the original founders, Alexander Jorias and Ingo Frick, are now working on a 3D chat with Social Networking Features, titled Club Cooee.

== Developed games ==
- The Settlers (MS-DOS port) (1994) - released in Germany under its original title Die Siedler, and in the United States as Serf City: Life is Feudal
- Archimedean Dynasty (1996) - released in Germany under its original title Schleichfahrt
- krass Engine (2001) - engine of the AquaNox series and SpellForce, and middleware of Legend of Kay
- AquaNox (2001)
- AquaNox 2: Revelation (2003)
- AquaNox: The Angel's Tears (canceled)
