= Gild =

Gild may refer to:

- Gilding, the application of gold leaf to other material
- Guild, an association of craftsmen
