= Traffic Giant =

2000 video game

- Developer: JoWooD Productions
- Publishers: JoWooD Productions; Macmillan Software
- Platform: Windows
- Release: EU: March 2, 2000; NA: February 28, 2001
- Genres: City-building game, real-time strategy
- Modes: Single-player, multiplayer

Traffic Giant (German: Der Verkehrsgigant) is a video game released in 2000 by Austrian developer JoWooD Productions. It allows players to create a working public transportation system in a city using buses, streetcars, commuter rail, suspended monorail (much like the Schwebebahn Wuppertal), and Maglev trains. The game used 2D isometric graphics for its interface.

== Reception ==
Reception

Aggregate score
Aggregator	Score
Metacritic	57/100

Review scores
Publication	Score
4Players	85%
Computer Games Magazine	2/5
Computer Gaming World	2.5/5
GameStar	67%
GameZone	8.5/10
PC Gamer (US)	74%
PC Zone	55%

The game received "mixed" reviews according to the review aggregation website Metacritic.

== See also ==
- Cities in Motion 2
- Mobility
- Train Fever
- Transport Tycoon
