= Freak Out: Extreme Freeride =

2007 video game

- PC version boxart
- Developer: ColdWood Interactive
- Publisher: JoWooD Productions
- Producer: Michael Kairat
- Platforms: PS2, Windows, PSP
- Release: FRA: February 9, 2007 (PC); FRA: March 23, 2007 (PS2); UK: March 30, 2007; WW: August 28, 2007 (PC)
- Genre: Sports
- Modes: Single-player, multiplayer

FreakOut: Extreme Freeride is a sports video game developed by Swedish studio ColdWood Interactive and published by JoWooD Productions. The player controls one of six playable skiers from a third-person perspective using a combination of buttons to jump and perform tricks, and has to complete challenges to unlock new mountains and equipment.

FreakOut was announced on August 16, 2006, and released on PlayStation 2, Windows and PlayStation Portable in 2007, before being made available worldwide via TotalGaming.net on August 28, 2007, and via Steam on January 13, 2015. It received generally favorable reviews from critics.

== Gameplay ==
In FreakOut: Extreme Freeride, the player can control six different playable skiers. Each skier has his own "special tricks." The player must complete challenges to unlock new mountains and equipment. While winning challenges, the player also increases his tricks, balance, and endurance skills.

=== Multiplayer ===
There are two different multi-player modes: "Splitscreen" and "Network." In the "Splitscreen" mode (which is not included in the PSP version), two players can race, either with a keyboard or joypad. However, in the "Network" mode, up to eight players can play together online. An online high score was also included, until the official FreakOut: Extreme Freeride website was taken down.

Players may initially choose from six skiing characters: three male and three female. Each character is of different age, comes from a different country and has their unique special tricks.

== Reception ==
Reviews for non-PC platforms were less favorable. In a PS2 review, Romendil of JeuxVideo.com said that while the game is not "calamitous," it lacks any "hair-raising" sensations and that the gameplay is " classic and accessible", but "doesn't reach the ankles of games that inspired it, such as SXX." However, both reviewers noted that the game's soundtrack was its strongest point.
