= Legends of Dawn =

2013 video game

- Developer: Dreamatrix Game Studios
- Engine: In-house
- Platform: Windows
- Release: Windows; 27 June 2013
- Genre: Role-playing game
- Mode: Single-player

Legends of Dawn is an open world action role-playing game developed by the Croatian developer Dreamatrix Game Studios and published via Steam. It was released worldwide on 27 June 2013 for Microsoft Windows. Set within a fictional world of Narr, which spans several continents, the player is free to explore and progress at his own pace.

== Gameplay ==
Legends of Dawn is an action role-playing game set in an open world environment.

== Development ==
It is unknown when the developers started working on the game, however, several months prior to release Dreamatrix initiated a Kickstarter project through a proxy company Aurofinity requesting $25,000 to actually finish the game, quoting the need to finance the various plug-ins integrated in the proprietary engine. The project was successfully funded on January 18 of 2013., yielding $46,536. With $21,536 of surplus financing, the community and the critics believed they had more than enough to adequately finish the game. Upon release, multiple questions arose as to where exactly the invested money went as the game was an absolute failure in all regards, with IGN going as far to calling out Steam for publishing an obviously broken game in their review, stating: "Legends Of Dawn isn't just bad, it's an embarrassment to its developers and @steam_games for selling it."

== Reception ==
The game has been universally panned by critics, holding the score of 29/100 on Metacritic. It was included in IGN's round-up of worst reviewed games of 2013, with the description: "Legends Of Dawn isn't just bad, it's an embarrassment." CD-Action gave it 10/100 stating: "An apology is in order to everyone who fell for the promises on Kickstarter and paid for this ruin of a game." LEVEL commented in their review: "A crappy system, technologically speaking it's an unfinished, irritating, and every now and then arrogant action RPG, with flaws as merits, demonstrating how to not make a game.", giving it 20/100.
