= Detroit (video game) =

1994 video game

- Cover art showing a 1958 Ford Edsel
- Developer: Impressions Games
- Publisher: Sierra On-Line
- Designer: David Lester
- Programmer: Dale Campbell
- Composers: Christopher J. Denman; Jason P. Rinaldi
- Platforms: MS-DOS, Amiga
- Release: NA: 1994; EU: 1994
- Genre: Business simulation
- Modes: Single-player, multiplayer

Detroit is a turn-based business simulation game that puts one in charge of a fledgling automobile company starting in 1908 (the year the Ford Model T was introduced). The player is responsible for the financing, research and development, design, testing, production, and marketing of automobile product lines. The aim of the game is to be the most profitable automobile business in the world after 100 years.

The game is named after the American city of Detroit which is nicknamed "Motor City" due to the concentration of American automobile manufacturers in the city during the 20th century. The German release was titled Rüsselsheim, after the German city of Rüsselsheim am Main famous for housing the Opel car company.

== Gameplay ==
The player starts off with a factory and a number of distributors. The player is always set against three competitors, which can be either human or computer. The game tends to follow common steps in a project lifecycle which involves the planning of a product, development of a product, testing of a product and its release to the public. The player is expected to follow this process whenever they wish to develop a new automobile.

Each turn is one month, and the game lasts approximately 100 years. At the start of each month, the player is presented with a money ledger showing the prior month's business. At this time newspapers also announce if cars are doing well or if there are special world events. World events that vastly affect gameplay are: World War I, The Great Depression, World War II, and the energy crisis of the 1970s. Most of these events negatively affect demand for all cars, with the exception of the energy crisis which targets low-mileage vehicles.

If at any time the player is bankrupt for long enough, the game ends with a scene of the player's avatar jumping out of a window.

The different aspects of the business are covered by different buildings at the factory (which is actually a pictorial representation of the main menu). Clicking on one of these buildings will bring up the following departments:

=== Manager's office ===
The manager's office acts as the player's interface to the numbers end of the business. Available from here is financial data concerning car models, factory production numbers, competition information, car reviews, and more. The player can manage the number of employees at factories, hire and fire new employees for factories, manage salaries (especially important to keep workers from striking), and commission reports to find out more about their automobiles.

A unique feature available in the manager's office is the ability to print most reports to the computer's printer.

=== Research and development ===
The research and development screen allows the player to invest their researchers into fields of development. These fields range from aesthetic changes such as body shape) to more technical ones such as new engines, suspension, brakes, safety and luxury features. The game references many real-world auto features as the fields progress, such as "drum brakes", "windshield wipers", and more.

=== Design and testing ===
One of the core parts of the gameplay is the ability to design new vehicles. Designing the body involves choosing what type of automobile (car, truck, etc.) and then three main sections of the car: the front, middle, and rear. Color can also be specified but has no discernible impact on the sales or reviews of the car.

As the player's research and development team develops more advanced features for the car, they become available on the design screen. However, all the parts have an associated cost and drive up the cost of the vehicle. They also affect the test results of the car. As time progresses, the public will demand different styles of car. For example, in the energy crisis, consumers will demand more fuel efficient cars. Ultimately it can be a game of trial-and-error finding a vehicle that the public likes.

During the testing phase the car is tested and then given a rating for handling in a corner, braking, acceleration, capacity (cargo and passenger), fuel economy, and safety. Generally, the better performance of the car, the more likely its success, especially if it conforms to the demands of the time or excels against the competition.

=== Manufacturing and sales ===
The manufacturing and sales screen allows the player to manage the production and distribution of vehicles. A world map of territories is displayed, whereby the player can click individual territories to display the factory and showroom in a territory. Here one can open or close down new factories and showrooms or upgrade the level of factories to make them more productive. Supply routes between factories and showrooms are also set and prioritized on this screen. The price of vehicles in each territory can also be set here.

=== Marketing ===
Here the player can invest funds into marketing of vehicles through various forms of media. Some will be more effective than others depending in which year the player is at in the game. Examples of media one can advertise with include billboards, newspapers, women's magazines, radio and television.

== Reception ==
Computer Gaming World rated Detroit two stars out of five. Describing it as "a puzzle game rather than a true strategy game", the magazine criticized the fixed demand values, repetitive gameplay, and unrealistic depiction of historical events.

== See also ==
- Car Tycoon, a 2003 computer game by Vectorcom Development
- Automation, an in-Beta descendant of Detroit
- Gearcity, a descendant of Detroit
