= Friedrichsbau (Stuttgart) =

Office building and theatre in Stuttgart, Germany

Coordinates: 48°46′50″N 9°10′34″E

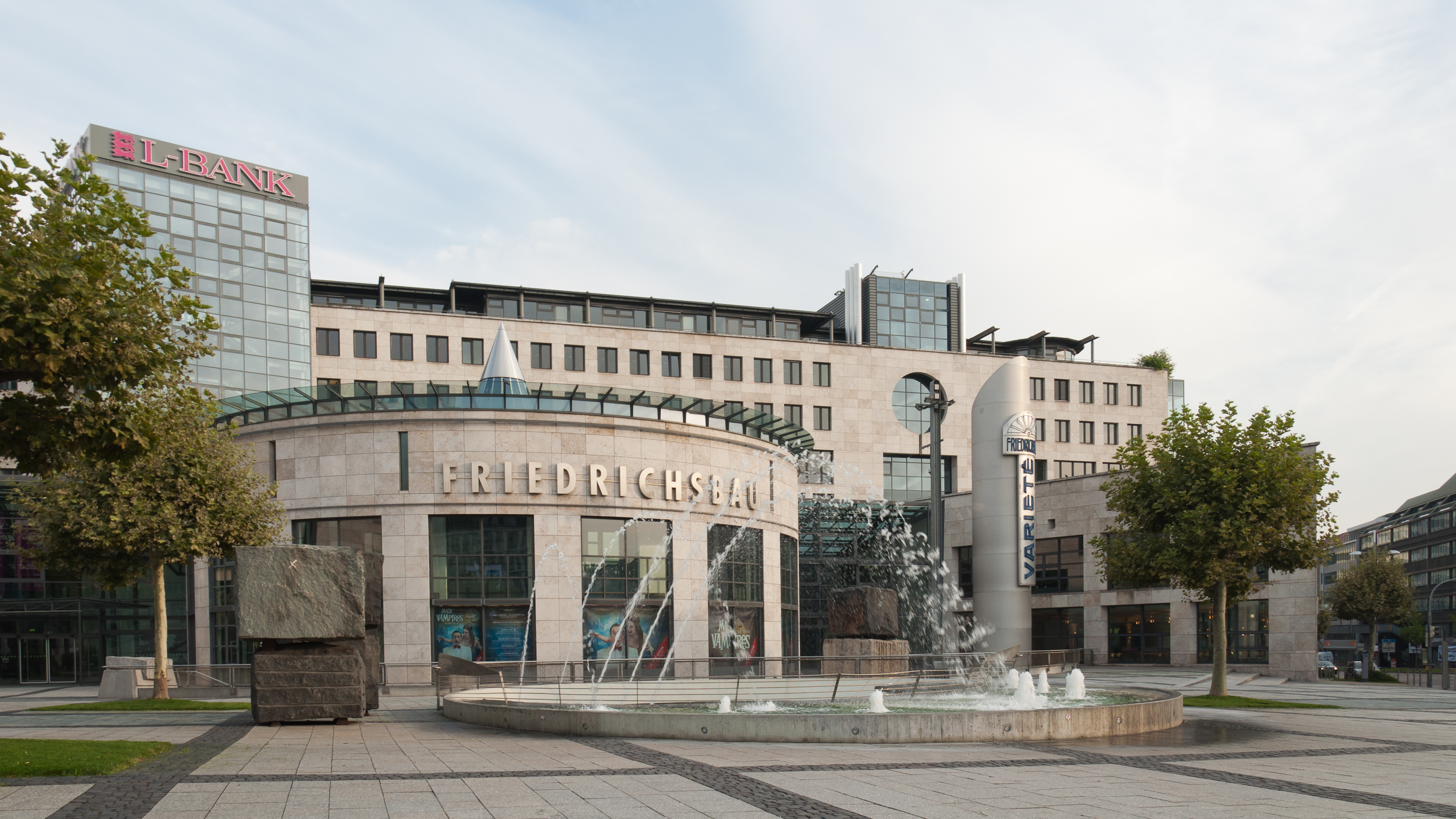
Friedrichsbau Varieté in 2013

Friedrichsbau is a theatre in Stuttgart, Baden-Württemberg, Germany.

== Building ==
The original Friedrichsbau was built as an Art Nouveau building in 1898. In addition to offices, it housed an 800-person theater hall on the 1st floor. In 1943, the building suffered severe war damage. After the Allied bombing raid in the night of July 25–26, 1944, the Friedrichsbau burned down completely. In 1955, the old Friedrichsbau was finally demolished in favor of a widening of Friedrichstraße.

In 1993, the new Friedrichsbau was built on the historic site by the state-owned L-Bank. Until 2014, it housed offices, stores and restaurants as well as the new Friedrichsbau Theater.

== Theatre ==
In 1900, the Friedrichsbau Theater was opened in the old Friedrichsbau. Its first director was Martin Klein. Ludwig Grauaug took over the directorship in 1901. In the 1920s and 1930s, international stars such as Grock, Josephine Baker, Charlie Rivel, Karl Valentin and Marita Gründgens performed at the Friedrichsbau Theater. Between 1931 and 1933, the theater was rebuilt. In 1933, Grauaug, as a Jew, was forced to leave Stuttgart.[1] Under the directorship of Emil Neidhard, Willy Reichert took over the artistic direction of the theater when it reopened. Together with Oscar Heiler, he performed regularly at the Friedrichsbau Theater. The Swabian characters Häberle and Pfleiderer, embodied by both of them, are closely connected with the Friedrichsbau Theater.

The Friedrichsbau Varieté opened in the new Friedrichsbau in 1994, with space for 369 guests. Gabriele Frenzel became the first general manager. The director of Circus Roncalli, Bernhard Paul, was appointed artistic director.

The previous sponsor and owner "L-Bank" terminated the lease in 2014. As a result, the Friedrichsbau Theater had to build a new building on the Pragsattel with the support of the city of Stuttgart.

== Present ==
Since January 1, 2014, Friedrichsbau Theater has been a non-profit company run by managing directors Gabriele Frenzel and Timo Steinhauer. On February 24, 2014, the Theater celebrated its 20th birthday. At that time, more than 1,900,000 people had visited Friedrichsbau and around 1,700 artists had performed in 6,605 shows.

Artistic performances range from cabaret and comedy to artistry, burlesque and magic. In addition to recurring guest performances, up to four in-house productions are staged annually.
