= Söldner: Secret Wars =

2004 video game

- Developer: Wings Simulations
- Publishers: EU: JoWooD Productions (Söldner, Marine Corps); NA: Encore, Inc. (Söldner); NA: Evolved Games (Semper Fidelis)
- Platform: Windows
- Release: EU: May 27, 2004; NA: June 22, 2004; Söldner: Marine Corps: EU: February 25, 2005; Semper Fidelis Marine Corps: NA: May 1, 2006
- Genre: Tactical shooter
- Mode: Multiplayer

Söldner: Secret Wars is a video game, developed by German studio Wings Simulations and published in 2004 by JoWooD Productions and Encore, Inc. The game can be played in first- or third-person. Players can control an individual soldier who can acquire and control a ground vehicle, ship, submarine, plane, VTOL or helicopter; a ground troop can be equipped with SCUBA gear, weapons with open, telescopic, and dot sights, smoke, fragment, and flash-bang grenades, explosives and booby traps, vehicle repair equipment, thermal scopes, and other gear.

A unique aspect of Soldner is the Advanced Destruction System (ADS) that it implements; explosives, bombs, and missiles can change the shape of terrain, crater runways and roads to make them unusable or difficult to navigate, and damage terrain, trees, and buildings used for cover as well as leaving debris which may become an obstacle for soldiers and vehicles.

An expansion pack, Marine Corps, was released in 2005.

In 2011, the game's developer JoWood was acquired by THQ Nordic, and development of the game was handed over to the game's community.

A remastered version was announced in 2023 to be developed by Pixelcloud Games.

== Reception ==
The commercial released version of Söldner: Secret Wars received "generally unfavorable reviews" according to the review aggregation website Metacritic.

A year after release Rock, Paper, Shotgun returned to the game and reports that in their opinion financial difficulties forced JoWood to release an unfinished game with a broken single player mode and buggy multiplayer mode, though it notes that the post-JoWood Soldner community had already formed and was already working on fixing the multiplayer game.

Reception

Aggregate score
Aggregator	Score
Metacritic	43/100

Review scores
Publication	Score
1Up.com	D+
Computer Gaming World	1.5/5
GameRevolution	F
GameSpot	5/10
GameSpy	2/5
GameZone	5.2/10
IGN	5/10
PC Format	54%
PC Gamer (US)	45%
X-Play	2/5
The Sydney Morning Herald	2/5
The Times	2/5
