= AquaNox (series) =

AquaNox is a series of submarine-based first-person shooter/simulation video games set in the distant future. The collection includes AquaNox, AquaNox 2: Revelation and AquaNox: The Angel's Tears. The predecessor and the starter of the series is the MS-DOS title Archimedean Dynasty.

== Concept ==
In the middle of the 22nd century, raw materials on Earth became increasingly scarce and as the end of the resources loomed, people began to prospect for resources on the ocean floor. This resulted in the construction of mining stations beneath the Pacific, Atlantic and Indian oceans. Many countries set up these deep-sea stations where workers and engineers extracted the oceans' treasures. Nevertheless, the output was far from enough to cover an ever-increasing demand. When the natural resources on Earth's surface were depleted, a time of destruction and wars began. In the fight over the planet's last remaining resources, alliances fell apart, countries became hostile and old conflicts flared up.

With increasing cruelty and senselessness, humanity destroyed the very basis of life on the surface of the Earth. After a series of resource wars, nuclear weapons completed the destruction that people had not yet finished with industrial pollution. When the last glimmer of hope for humanity's survival was extinguished, people fled into the depths of the oceans.

The former extraction stations became the last refuge of those fortunate enough to be able to pay the price of entry into the underwater world. The poorest of the poor were left behind, condemned to die in a desolate world polluted by radioactivity. Life outside the oceans became impossible as the continents were flooded by rising sea levels and a harsh nuclear winter covered most of the oceans and the shrinking surface landmass of the planet with a layer of radioactive dust, snow and ice many meters thick. A 40-meter thick layer of dead organic matter, the so-called POM layer, covered the oceans. Not a single ray of sunlight penetrated the dense particulate layer that plunged the world into a darkness like none other. Nevertheless, humankind rose one last time to a new life, the only life, in a dead new world. This world was humanity's creation, and was now called Aqua. The following events take place in the middle of the 27th century.

Today, in the year 2661, humankind lives in gigantic cities underwater. Aqua is divided into political power blocs, such as the Aquatoria of the capitalistic, democratically governed Atlantic Federation, the oligarchy of the Arabic Clans Union and the monarchist Russo-Japanese Shogunate. In the South Pacific lies the Tornado Zone, stirred up by surface storms, where an anarchist pack of mercenaries, pirates, buccaneers and outlaws gathers, ever ready to sell their friends and their souls.

A single company has long ago monopolized many industries necessary for human survival underwater—EnTrOx, which stands for "Energy-Transportation-Oxygen". New technologies allow extremely fast underwater travel. However, many old technologies are lost or have become useless. For example, due to the high amounts of fallout in the atmosphere, satellite communication and global positioning are impossible, although some organizations are looking for ways to restore these abilities.

The player's task is to complete a series of story-related combat missions. During the course of the missions additional support and story elements are revealed by the secondary characters. The enemies range from hostile vessels to alien or artificial life-forms such as Bionts.

== Episodes ==
The Aquanox series include the following games, listed by release in chronological order:

=== AquaNox ===
AquaNox
- Developer: Massive Development
- Publisher: Ravensburger Interactive Media
- Platform: Windows
- Release: GER: 12 October 2001; UK: 9 November 2001; NA: 15 November 2001
- Genres: First-person shooter Submarine simulator
- Modes: Single-player, multiplayer

The player once again jumps into the role of Emerald "Deadeye" Flint. After the Bionts are defeated, Flint goes back to being a mercenary as a leader of a Biont-hunting task force. Things turn for the worse when his submarine, the Succubus, is stolen on one of the stations. The game begins with one of Flint's dubious acquaintances giving him an old, barely working sub and several missions to get him started.

Throughout the game, Flint earns money by completing missions, allowing him to purchase better subs, weapons and equipment. The new equipment appears throughout the game, available for purchase, as the player progress in the storyline. Generally speaking, the player is allowed to buy a new boat and a new set of weaponry per chapter. While on stations, Flint can speak with various characters in order to get new missions and deepen the atmosphere of the game.

The former system of upgrading the vessel with a variety of defensive turrets has been simplified by fixing the player's view to the cockpit as well as permitting the usage of only two on-hull-installed cannons. As the result of this change, the controls of the submarine have been adapted to the first-person shooter's mouse-based layout, removing the need for the joystick, thus the game has compromised its tactical depth in order to increase the intensity of combat. This change has raised critique among the reviewers, stating that the developers' focus fell inadequately on the visual performance rather than the actual gameplay of its predecessor.

...But while Archimedean Dynasty was a complex, mission-based simulation with trading and privateering, AquaNox is an arcade-style action game that abandons or greatly simplifies those elements. Combat is fast paced and more similar in style to Quake's, or even a rail shooter's, than it is to the more tactical battles in other underwater sims.

— Desslock (2001-11-30). "AquaNox Review". Gamespot.com.

The game was one of the first applications to fully use the T&L effects by supporting the NVIDIA Geforce 3 Ti graphics accelerator.

Considering the game engine has been used for months to market Nvidia's flagship GeForce 3 video card, it's no surprise that the graphics are outstanding. The game has been designed to take advantage of all the high-end capabilities of the GeForce and its latest generation of cards, and the environments look amazing as a result. Textures are colourful and extremely detailed, and there are numerous little graphical touches, such as chips that flake off underwater hills hit by your projectile weapons.

— Desslock (2001-11-30). "AquaNox Review". Gamespot.com.

The game includes a vast amount of true information on oceans, such as origins of different species, their specifics and humanity's adaptation to submarine life. The game manual consists of two chapters explaining various terms and facts that have been mentioned throughout the course of the story.

=== AquaNox 2: Revelation ===
AquaNox 2: Revelation
- Developer: Massive Development
- Publishers: NA: Encore Software; EU: JoWooD Productions
- Platform: Windows
- Release: NA: 19 August 2003; UK: 19 September 2003
- Genres: First-person shooter Submarine simulator
- Mode: Single-player

The plot of the game centers on William Drake, the last remnant of the old aristocratic, industrialist family. After the bankruptcy of the family business and the death of the protagonist's grandmother, young William Drake sets "sail" for open seas on the last freighter of Drake Enterprises. The cargo ship soon gets taken over by a group of mercenaries while Drake rushes out to answer a distress call. While sparing his life, the group of seven invaders seize control of the boat, thus binding Williams' fate to their own. Drake sees no other option but to ally himself with his new crew, hoping for the best.

The game features a total of four unique, playable and upgradeable gunships. The player most likely switches boats depending on a given mission's parameters. While certain missions require speed and stealth, others virtually require a heavy arsenal and thick plating. The game features a large variety of projectile armament as well as a set of torpedoes and a collection of directed energy weaponry, including lasers and EMP launchers. The torpedo combat is similar to the missile engagements of most flight simulators and space shooters, where the pilot is expected to release flares and perform classic evasion manoeuvres.

Traveling is generally a simple matter of following the navigation points spread out through the game. The ship's controls can be switched from the FPS mode to Simulation Mode via a predefined shortcut, where the latter steering scheme switches the horizontal scrolling of the mouse from turning the cockpit horizontally to rotating the hull around its axis. Reaching the surface is not possible due to the depth-range limitation, which binds the player to the underwater world yet gives certain disadvantages during combat.

In response to criticisms of poor interaction with other characters in AquaNox, a new dialogue system was added in the sequel. Between missions, the player is able to initiate conversations while on board the freighter as well as in the oceanic cities. The initiation of the conversations is mandatory. However, due to the absence of interaction during the dialogues, the outcome of the game is not open-ended. The dialogue and characters are the focus of many reviewers' ire, who criticize it as poorly-written and ultimately pointless.

=== AquaNox: The Angel's Tears ===
AquaNox: The Angel's Tears is the PlayStation 2 and Xbox remake of AquaNox 2: Revelation. The title did not pass Sony's software quality assurance test and as Massive Development had already been closed by JoWood Productions, the release was cancelled.

=== AquaNox: Deep Descent ===
AquaNox: Deep Descent
- Developer: Digital Arrow
- Publisher: THQ Nordic
- Platform: Windows
- Release: 16 October 2020
- Genres: First-person shooter Submarine simulator
- Mode: Single player

At Gamescom 2014, Nordic Games presented a tech demo of a new iteration from the Aquanox series. The Nordic Games officials confirmed they were working on a new iteration of the game. The demo was created using Unreal Engine 3 and showed a bit of the environment and one ship model prototype along with a hangar interface. The game was successfully crowdfunded through Kickstarter on 11 September 2015 by amassing US$95,979, surpassing its US$75,000 goal. The game was released on October 16, 2020, in stores and on Steam. The game is developed by Serbian studio Digital Arrow.

== See also ==
- List of underwater science fiction works
