= Guild =

Association of artisans or merchants

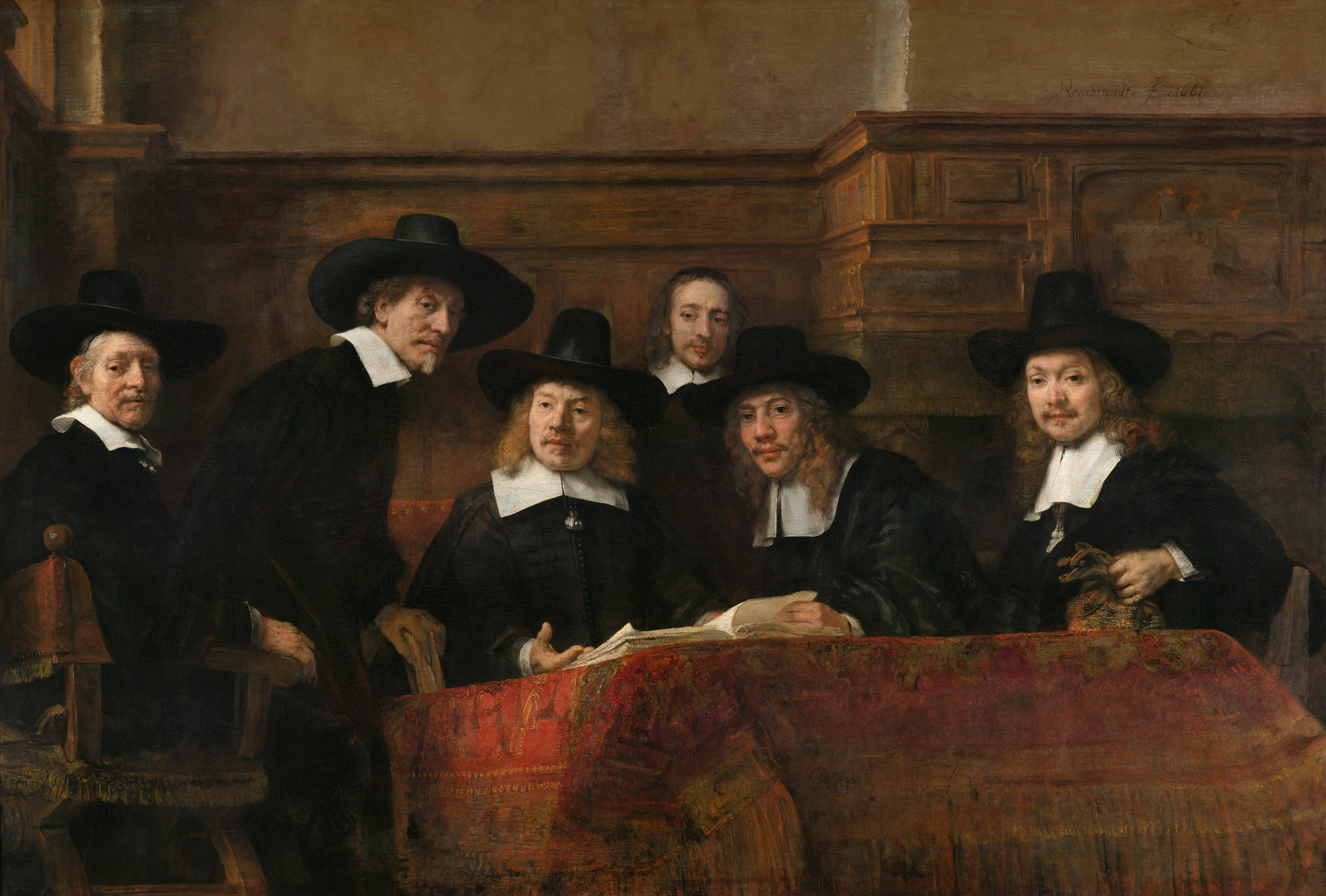
The Syndics of the Drapers' Guild by Rembrandt, 1662

A guild (/ɡɪld/, GHILD) is a professional association of artisans and merchants who oversee the practice of their craft/trade in a particular territory. The word derives from medieval Europe where guilds were probably at their most extensive, but it has been used to describe similar groups before and after that period and in other parts of the world.

Typically, the key privilege for guild members was control of trade in a given city. There might be controls on minimum or maximum prices, hours of trading, numbers of apprentices, and many other factors. Critics argued these rules reduced free competition, but defenders maintained guilds protected professional standards.

== Early history ==
Naram-Sin of Akkad (c. 2254–2218 BC), grandson of Sargon of Akkad who had unified Sumeria and Assyria into the Akkadian Empire, promulgated common Mesopotamian standards for length, area, volume, weight, time, and shekels, which were used by artisan guilds in each city. Code of Hammurabi Law 234 (c. 1755–1750 BC) stipulated a 2-shekel wage for each 60-gur (300-bushel) vessel constructed in an employment contract between a shipbuilder and a ship-owner. Law 275 stipulated a ferry rate of 3-gerah per day on a charterparty between a ship charterer and a shipmaster. Law 276 stipulated a 2 1/2-gerah per day freight rate on a contract of affreightment between a charterer and shipmaster, while Law 277 stipulated a 1/6-shekel per day freight rate for a 60-gur vessel.

Collegium or corpus were a type of guild active in Ancient Rome times. Although a collegium was any association or corporation that acted as a legal entity, many were organised groups of merchants who specialised in a particular craft and whose membership of the group was voluntary. One such example is the corpus naviculariorum, a collegium of merchant mariners based at Rome's La Ostia port. The Roman guilds failed to survive the collapse of the Roman Empire.

== Middle ages and early modern period ==
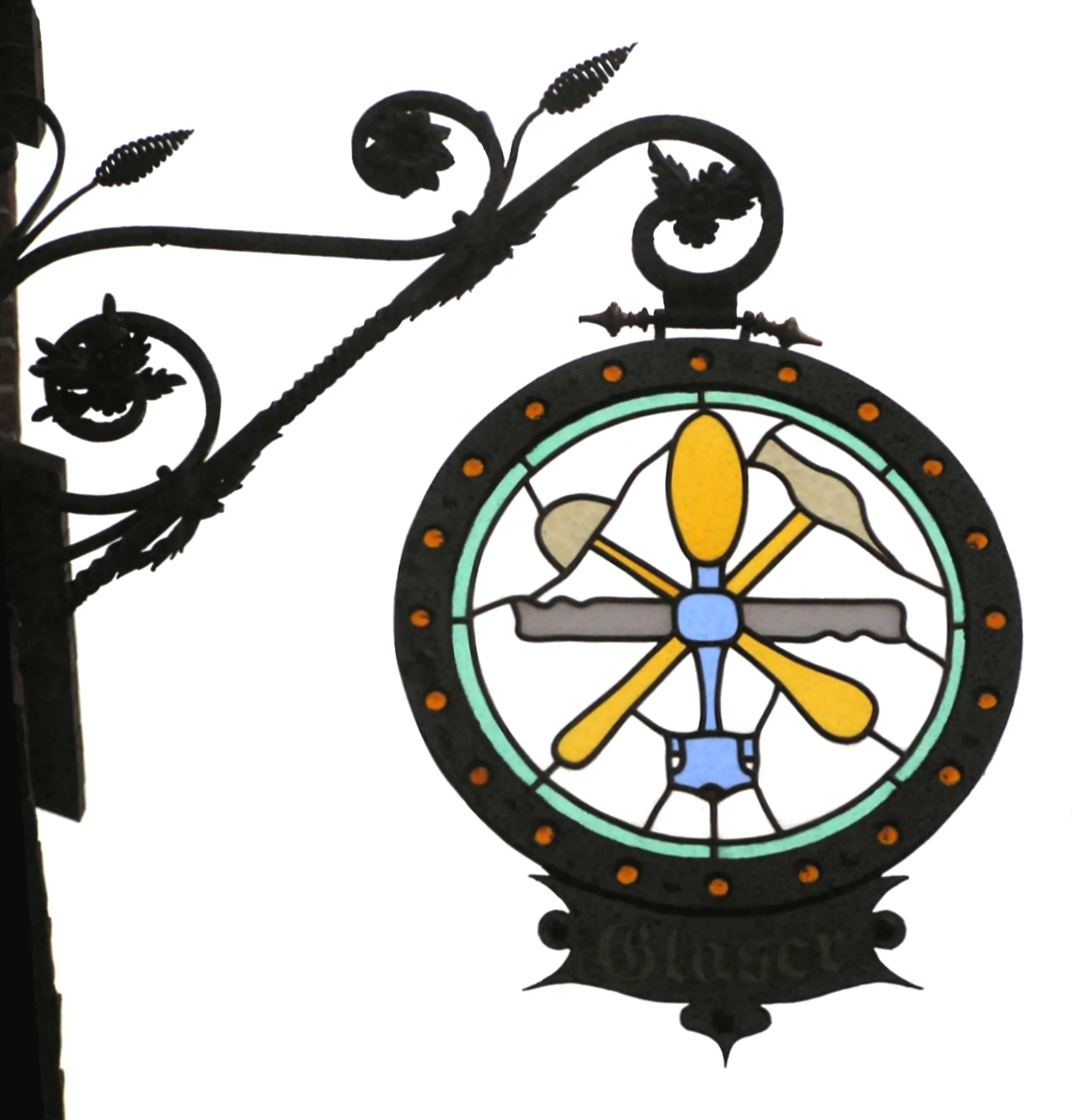
Traditional hand-forged guild sign of a glazier in Germany. These signs can be found in many old European towns where guild members marked their places of business. Many survived through time or staged a comeback in industrial times. Today they are restored or newly created, especially in old town areas.

=== Role ===
Evolving from earlier fraternity groups for protective or religious purposes, also called guilds, merchant and craft guilds developed into structured organizations that regulated trade, upheld product quality and protected members' economic interests, becoming more common across Europe during the High Middle Ages as urban economies became more specialized. Merchant guilds dominated commercial activity and urban governance in many towns. The craft guilds transmitted skills through formal systems of apprenticeship, journeymanship and mastery, and oversaw the production of goods ranging from textiles and metalwork to glassmaking and baking. In major cities such as Florence, Paris, Barcelona, and the German free cities, guilds became central to economic and civic life, often numbering in the dozens or even hundreds.

Guilds also fulfilled important social and political functions. Many exercised influence within municipal governments, especially in the prosperous cities of Italy, Germany, and the Low Countries, where they sometimes challenged patrician elites. They maintained welfare funds for sick or elderly members, supported widows and orphans, organized feasts, and reinforced communal religious life. Their authority rested on charters or letters patent granting them legal privileges, including monopolies on production within their locality and the right to enforce professional standards. These privileges often restricted entry into skilled trades and shaped urban societies around tightly controlled economic hierarchies.

=== Women's participation ===
Women's participation in medieval guilds was diverse and often constrained: while guild membership granted economic and social opportunities, most craft and trade guilds were male-dominated, typically allowing women to enter only through marriage or as widows or daughters of masters and generally excluding them from guild offices. Nonetheless, evidence from England and the rest of the continent shows that women did engage widely in guild life, silkwomen from London could inherit property and run businesses, and Étienne Boileau's Livre des métiers records several Parisian guilds as female monopolies, with others open to women such as surgeons and glass-blowers. In Rouen, women had participated as full-fledged masters in 7 of the city's 112 guilds since the 13th century. In cities like Rouen and Cologne, women held full master status in select guilds and dominated certain trades, though restrictions persisted, especially in medical guilds, where religious and secular authorities often opposed female practitioners. Historiographical debates, notably following Alice Clark's 1919 study, highlight contrasting interpretations of whether medieval guild structures ultimately empowered women or, increasingly in the early modern era, limited their economic roles.

Historians disagree sharply on whether women's participation in guilds declined during the early modern period: while Alice Clark's "decline thesis" argues that women became economically marginalized in the 17th century, later scholarship counters that domestic life did not dictate women's labor and that women remained active in markets, crafts, and wage work. Research by Clare Crowston highlights that women in several trades, such as linen drapers, hemp merchants, seamstresses, and flower sellers, formed independent guilds and in some regions gained expanded rights, as seen in 17th- and 18th-century Paris, Rouen, Dijon, and Nantes. However, in parts of Germany, historians like Merry Wiesner document a real decline driven by economic specialization and cultural norms, with guilds increasingly restricting women's roles and barring their employment, a pattern reinforced by Ogilvie's work. Despite these regional contrasts, exclusively female guilds proliferated in the 17th century, especially in Paris, Rouen, and Cologne, where some guilds had been predominantly female since medieval times.

=== Fall of the Guilds ===
Enlightenment thinkers such as Adam Smith argued that guild monopolies inhibited free trade, innovation, and technological progress. As centralized nation-states expanded their authority, new systems of patents and economic regulation weakened guild control. The French Revolution accelerated this decline with the abolition of guilds in 1791, and most European countries gradually followed during the 18th and 19th centuries as industrialization made guild-based production less viable. Historians continue to debate the economic impact of guilds: some regard them as monopolistic and rent-seeking, while others argue they facilitated training, quality control, and technological adaptation.

== Guilds outside Europe ==
Outside Europe, guild-like organizations of artisans and merchants developed in a variety of forms:

- Ancient and early medieval India saw powerful corporate bodies of craftsmen and traders known as śreṇi.
- The Ottoman Empire had the Akhiya fraternities.
- Late-imperial China saw merchant and craft guilds such as the gongsuo became prominent from the 17th century.
- Medieval and early-modern Japan had trade and craft guilds known as za, and later kabunakama, secured monopolies in particular markets, before being transformed or dissolved with the Meiji-era reorganization of commerce.
- In the Aztec Empire, the pochteca had merchant guilds.
- Guilds for artists in Benin Kingdom were known as Igun.

== Modern guilds ==
Professional organizations replicate guild structure and operation. Professions such as architecture, engineering, geology, and land surveying require varying lengths of apprenticeships before one can gain a "professional" certification. These certifications hold great legal weight: most states make them a prerequisite to practicing there.

Though most guilds died off by the middle of the nineteenth century, quasi-guilds persist today, primarily in the fields of law, medicine, engineering, and academia. Paralleling or soon after the fall of guilds in Britain and in the United States professional associations began to form. In the US, a number of interested parties sought to emulate the model of apprenticeship which European guilds of the Middle Ages had honed to achieve their ends of establishing exclusivity in trades as well as the English concept of a gentleman which had come to be associated with higher income and craftsmanship

Licensing and accreditation practices which typically result from the lobbying of professional associations constitute the modern equivalent of a 'guild-privilege', albeit in contrast to guilds of the Middle Ages which held a letters patent which explicitly granted them monopolies on the provision of services, today's quasi-guild privileges are subtler, more complex, and less directly restrictive to consumers in their nature.

There are often subtle dichotomies present in attempting to answer the question of whether modern licensing and accreditation practices are intended to serve the public good, however it be defined. For medieval guilds this dichotomy is exemplified by differing explanations of the same phenomena; of limiting work hours among guild members. Sheilagh Ogilvie argues that this was intended to mitigate competition among guild members, while Dorothy Terry argues this was to prevent guild members from working late into the night while tired and when lighting is poor and therefore producing low quality work.

As argued by Paul Starr and Ronald Hamowy, both of whose focus is on the development of medicine in the United States, the tying of medical licensing practices to universities was a process intended to do more than protect the public from 'quackery', but was engineered to be unnecessarily prolonged, inefficient, and a costly process so as to deter 'outsiders' from getting into the field, thereby enhancing the prestige and earning power of medical professionals.

The university system in general continues to serve as a basis upon which modern quasi-guilds operate in the form of professionalism. 'Universitas' in the Middle Ages meant a society of masters who had the capacity for self-governance, and this term was adopted by students and teachers who came together in the twelfth century to form scholars guilds. Though guilds mostly died off by the middle of the nineteenth century, the scholars guild persisted due to its peripheral nature to an industrialized economy. In the words of Elliot Krause,

The university and scholars' guilds held onto their power over membership, training, and workplace because early capitalism was not interested in it (there was no product that the capitalist wished to produce)...the cultural prestige of knowledge itself helped keep the scholars' guild and the university alive while all other guilds failed. - Elliot Krause, The Death of Guilds (1996)

Though in theory anyone can start a college, the 'privilege' in this case is the linking of federal aid to accreditation. While accreditation of a university is entirely optional, attending an accredited university is a prerequisite to receiving federal aid, and this has a powerful influence on limiting consumer options in the field of education as it provides a mechanism to limit entrepreneurial 'outsiders' from entering the field of education. George Leef and Roxana Burris study the accreditation system for which they observe is 'highly collegial' and potentially bias in the fact that accreditation review is performed by members of schools who will in turn be reviewed by many of the same people who they have reviewed. They further question the effectiveness of the methods involved in accreditation,

Although accreditation is usually justified as a means of giving students and parents an assurance of educational quality, it is important to note that the accreditors do not endeavor to assess the quality of individual programs or departments.... The accreditation system is not based on an evaluation of the results of an institution, but rather upon an evaluation of its inputs and processes. If the inputs and processes look good, acceptable educational quality is assumed. It is as if an organization decided which automobiles would be allowed to be sold by checking to make sure that each car model had tires, doors, an engine and so forth and had been assembled by workers with proper training—but without actually driving any cars - George C. Leef and Roxana D. Burris, Can College Accreditation Live Up To Its Promise?

Taken in the context of guilds, it can be argued that the purpose of accreditation is to provide a mechanism for members of the scholars guild to protect itself, both by limiting outsiders from entering the field and by enforcing established norms onto one another. Contriving means to limit the number of outsiders who gain an entrance to a field (exclusivity) and to enforce work norms among members were both distinguishing feature of guilds in the Middle Ages.

=== Quasi-guilds in the information economy ===
In 1998, Thomas W. Malone championed a modern variant of the guild structure for independent contractors and remote workers. Insurance including any professional legal liability, intellectual capital protections, an ethical code perhaps enforced by peer pressure and software, and other benefits of a strong association of producers of knowledge, benefit from economies of scale, and may prevent cut-throat competition that leads to inferior services undercutting prices. As with historical guilds, such a structure will resist foreign competition.

The open-source-software movement has from time to time explored a guild-like structure to unite against competition from Microsoft, e.g. Advogato assigns journeyer and master ranks to those committing to work only or mostly on free software.

Patents loosely serve as a form of guild privilege in that they restrict potential newcomers to a field of service. The idea of a patent being applied to intangibles such as intellectual property has been called to question by various authors. In Capital and Ideology (2019) Thomas Piketty questions the validity of patents being granted to agricultural corporations who claim to have 'invented' certain GMO seeds. According to Piketty, the falsity of such claims is that the specific breakthrough which allowed for the development of these GMO seeds was in fact only the outcome of generations of public investment in education and research.

=== International examples ===
==== Europe ====
In many European countries, guilds have experienced a revival as local trade organizations for craftsmen, primarily in traditional skills. They may function as forums for developing competence and are often the local units of a national employer's organisation.

In the City of London, the medieval guilds survive as livery companies, all of which play a ceremonial role in the city's many customs as well as having charitable roles. The City of London livery companies maintain strong links with their respective trade, craft or profession, some still retain regulatory, inspection or enforcement roles. The senior members of the City of London Livery Companies (known as liverymen) elect the sheriffs and approve the candidates for the office of Lord Mayor of London. Guilds also survive in many other towns and cities the UK including in Preston, Lancashire, as the Preston Guild Merchant where among other celebrations descendants of burgesses are still admitted into membership. With the City of London livery companies, the UK has over 300 extant guilds and growing.

In 1878, the London livery companies established the City and Guilds of London Institute the forerunner of the engineering school (still called City and Guilds College) at Imperial College London. The aim of the City and Guilds of London Institute was the advancement of technical education. "City and Guilds" operates as an examining and accreditation body for vocational, managerial and engineering qualifications from entry-level craft and trade skills up to post-doctoral achievement. A separate organisation, the City and Guilds of London Art School has also close ties with the London livery companies and is involved in the training of master craftworkers in stone and wood carving, as well as fine artists.

In Germany, there are no longer any Zünfte (or Gilden – the terms used were rather different from town to town), nor any restriction of a craft to a privileged corporation. However, guilds continue to exist under another old name, Innungen, as private associations with membership limited to practitioners of particular trades or activities. These associations are corporations under public law, although membership is voluntary; the president normally comes from the ranks of master-craftsmen and is called Obermeister ("master-in-chief"). Journeymen elect their own representative bodies, with their president having the traditional title of Altgesell (senior journeyman).

There are also "craft chambers" (Handwerkskammern), which have less resemblance to ancient guilds in that they are organized for all crafts in a certain region, not just one. Membership is mandatory, and they serve to establish self-governance of the crafts.

==== India ====
India's guilds include the Students Guild, Indian Engineers Guild, and the Safety Guild. Other professional associations include the Indian Medical Association, Indian Engineers, Indian Dental Association, United Nurses Association, etc. Most of them have names containing Union, Association or Society.

==== North America ====
In the United States guilds exist in several fields. Often, they are better characterized as labor unions — for example, The Newspaper Guild is a labor union for journalists and other newspaper workers, with over 30,000 members in North America.

In the film and television industry, guild membership is generally a prerequisite for working on major productions in certain capacities. The Screen Actors Guild, Directors Guild of America, Writers Guild of America, East, Writers Guild of America, West and other profession-specific guilds have the ability to exercise strong control in the cinema of the United States as a result of a rigid system of intellectual-property rights and a history of power-brokers also holding guild membership (e.g., DreamWorks Pictures founder Steven Spielberg is a DGA member). These guilds maintain their own contracts with production companies to ensure a certain number of their members are hired for roles in each film or television production, and that their members are paid a minimum of guild "scale," along with other labor protections. These guilds set high standards for membership, and exclude professional actors, writers, etc. who do not abide by the strict rules for competing within the film and television industry in the US.

Real-estate brokerage offers an example of a modern American guild system. Signs of guild behavior in real-estate brokerage include: standard pricing (6% of the home price), strong affiliation among all practitioners, self-regulation (see National Association of Realtors), strong cultural identity (the Realtor brand), little price variation with quality differences, and traditional methods in use by all practitioners. In September 2005 the U.S. Department of Justice filed an antitrust lawsuit against the National Association of Realtors, challenging NAR practices that (the DOJ asserted) prevent competition from practitioners who use different methods. The DOJ and the Federal Trade Commission in 2005 advocated against state laws, supported by NAR, that disadvantage new kinds of brokers. U.S. v. National Assoc. of Realtors, Civil Action No. 05C-5140 (N.D. Ill. Sept. 7, 2005).

The practice of law in the United States also exemplifies modern guilds at work. Every state maintains its own bar association, supervised by that state's highest court. The court decides the criteria for entering and staying in the legal profession. In most states, every attorney must become a member of that state's bar association in order to practice law. State laws forbid any person from engaging in the unauthorized practice of law and practicing attorneys are subject to rules of professional conduct that are enforced by the state's supreme court.

Medical associations comparable to guilds include the state Medical Boards, the American Medical Association, and the American Dental Association. Medical licensing in most states requires specific training, tests and years of low-paid apprenticeship (internship and residency) under harsh working conditions. Even qualified international or out-of-state doctors may not practice without acceptance by the local medical guild (Medical board). Similarly, nurses and physicians' practitioners have their own guilds. A doctor cannot work as a physician's assistant unless they separately train, test and apprentice as one.

==== Australia ====
Australia has several guilds. The most notable of these is The Pharmacy Guild of Australia, created in 1927 as the Federated Pharmaceutical Services Guild of Australia. The Pharmacy Guild serves "6,000 community pharmacies," while also providing training and standards for the country's pharmacists. Australia's other guilds include the Australian Directors Guild, representing the country's directors, documentary makers and animators, the Australian Writers' Guild, the Australian Butcher's Guild, a fraternity of independent butchers which provides links to resources like Australian meat standards and a guide to different beef cuts, and The Artists Guild, a craft guild focusing on female artists.

== In fiction ==
- In the Dune universe, an organization known as the Spacing Guild controls the means of interstellar travel and thus wields great power.
- In the classic 1939 film The Wizard of Oz, an organization known as the Lollipop Guild was a group of Munchkins in the Munchkin Country, who welcomed Dorothy Gale to the Land of Oz with song and dance upon her arrival. They present her with an oversized lollipop.
- In video games, guilds are used as associations of players or characters with similar interests, such as dungeons, crafting, or player versus player combat.
- In Star Wars, there is a bounty hunter guild.
- In Terry Pratchett's Discworld novels, the guilds of the city of Ankh-Morpork are major civic and economic institutions, with some serving as equivalents to trade unions or government bodies. The Presidents and Heads of the Guilds form an unofficial city council which may advise the Patrician during times of crisis. As part of Lord Vetinari's efforts to 'organise' and reduce crime, criminals including thieves, assassins and 'seamstresses' were allowed to reorganise as guilds.
- In The Venture Brothers, most super-villains in the series belong to The Guild of Calamitous Intent, which regulates their menacing activities towards their respective protagonists, while also shielding said villains from criminal prosecution. Much of the show's storyline revolves around politics within the Guild.
- In Hiro Mashima's work Fairy Tail, there exists a guild of that name, including many other kinds of guilds in the kingdom of Fiore.
- In the series The Lord of the Rings: The Rings of Power, the powerful island kingdom of Númenor is characterized by several guilds, each signified by a metal crest worn on the torso.
- In Magic: The Gathering, one of the most popular planes is Ravnica, which is run by 10 guilds (although these 10 guilds are not necessarily involved in trade, and the term is used more as a substitute for faction).
- In the anime Bungo Stray Dogs by Kafka Asagiri, there is an American organisation called The Guild.

== Examples of guilds ==
- Catholic Police Guild
- Timpani Guilds
- Guilds of Brussels
- Guild of Saint Luke — painter's guilds
- Guild of St. Bernulphus
- Livery company
- List of guilds in the United Kingdom
- Meistersinger - a German guild of poets, songwriters, and musicians
- Puy - a French guild of poets and musicians
- Germania (guild) – artisan guilds in Valencia, Spain

== See also ==
- Bourgeois of Brussels
- Bourgeois of Paris
- Community of practice
- Cooperative
- Corporatism
- Craft Unionism
- Distributism
- Guildhall
- Guild socialism
- Kibbutz
- Retail - particularly History of retail
- Trade association
- Trade union
