= Guild Theatre =

Guild Theatre may refer to:

- August Wilson Theatre, formerly Guild Theatre, Broadway, Manhattan, New York
- Guild Theatre, Melbourne, at the University of Melbourne
- Guild Theatre (Portland, Oregon)
