= Bernard Guild =

Bernard "Ben" Guild
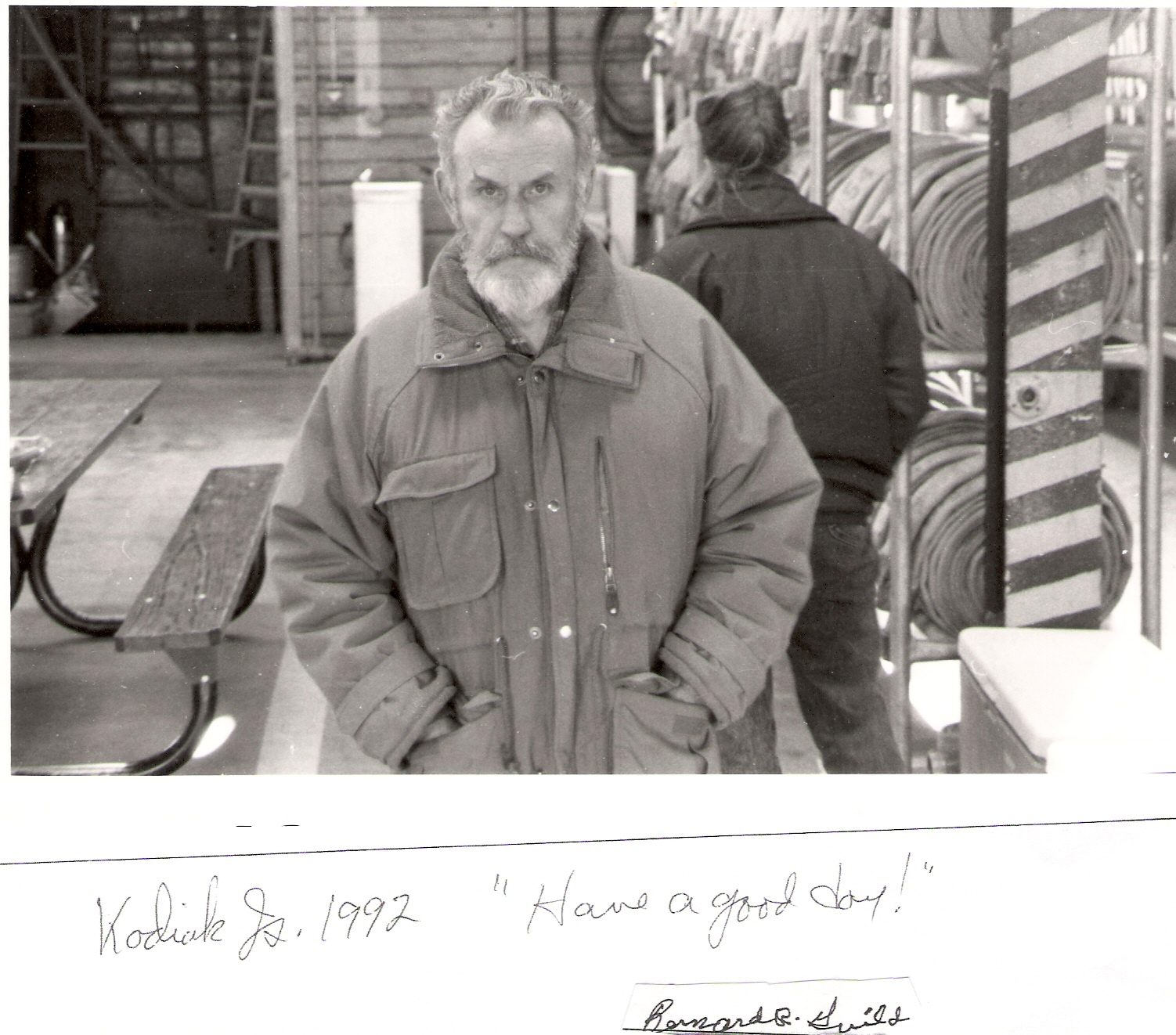
- Born: 14 April 1924
- Died: 10 May 2003 (aged 79); Elmendorf AFB, Alaska, US
- Resting place: Fort Richardson National Cemetery
- Known for: Author POW

Bernard "Ben" Guild (1924–2003), was an authority on Alaska mushrooms and a supporter of the founding of Aniakchak National Monument and Preserve.

Every grave on the lands and in those oceans are a tomb to an idea. Some wrong, some right, but mostly political. But the graves are never wrong - they are monuments to the heroic men who sleep there. For who has the right to say that any man who has borne the brunt of the battle and given up his life in doing so, was wrong?

— Bernard Guild on May 20, 2002

== World War II ==
Ben was part of the Twelfth Air Force, 57th Air Division, 321st Bomb Group (see 321st Air Expeditionary Wing), 447th Squadron. He was shot down on 6 February 1945 on a mission to Rovereto Station to attack the rail bridge in Crema, Italy. The plane was called May Be, and Guild was a radioman. Ben was captured and became a POW held by Germany in Stalag Luft III Sagan-Silesia Bavaria (Moved to Nuremberg-Langwasser Stalag XIII-D) 49–11. The story of Guild is discussed in the book The Story of the ‘Maybe’ The B-25J Mitchell bombardier that crashed on 6 February 1945 at monte Brugnolo between valle di Gresta and Arco (first edition) publication date Sep 2014.

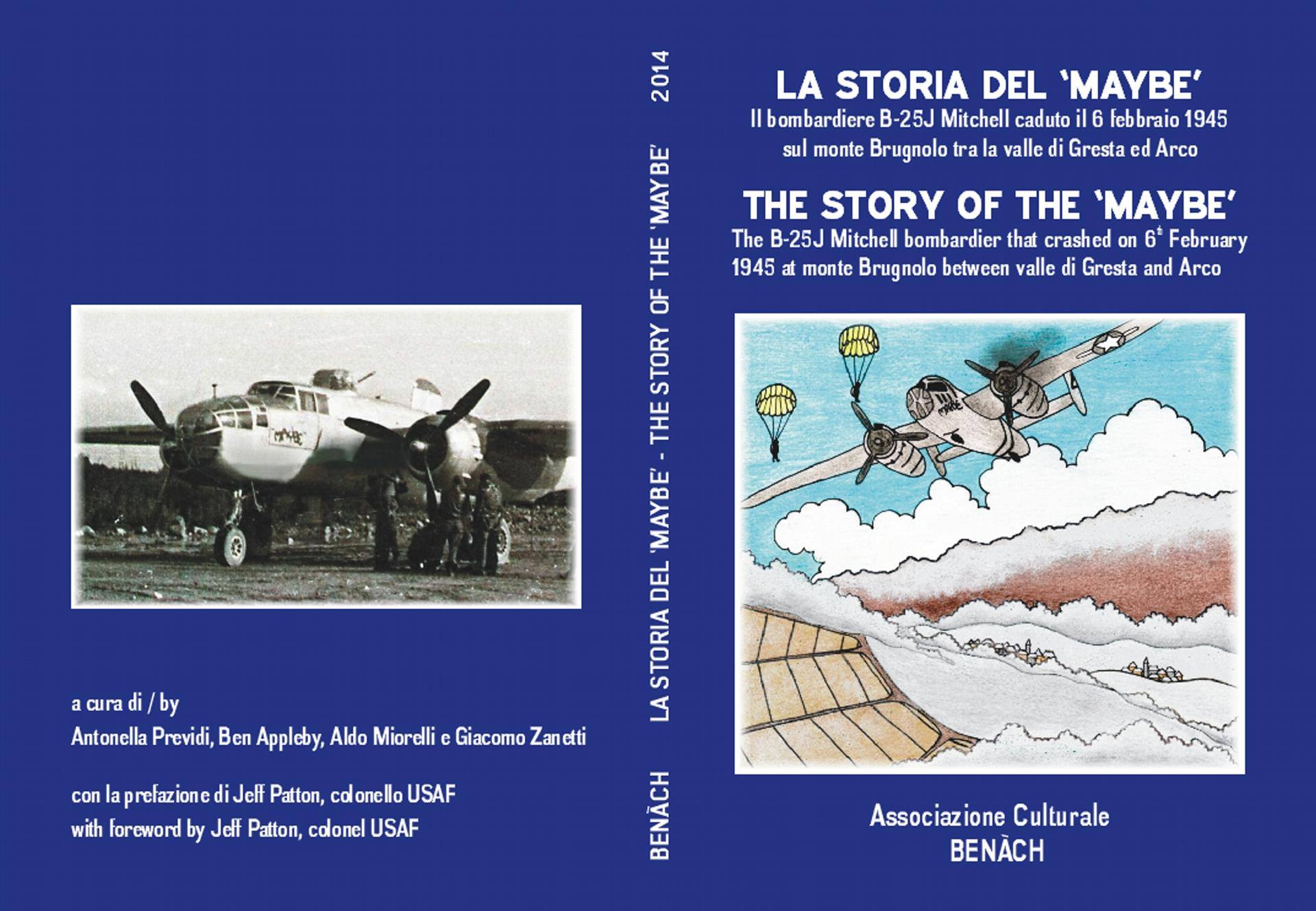
Maybe book cover

== Alaska ==
Bernard Guild was a microbiologist by training, and an ex-teacher of science and ecology, who moved to Alaska in 1970 to hunt and fish and photograph and write—mostly to write.

Bernard Guild was a teacher and writer by profession, adopted Alaskan by avocation and a muzzle-loader for the pure sport of it.

On an investigative trip out to the Caldera in August 1976, [Ralph] Root encountered one of Aniakchak's first non-hunting visitors since Hubbard, a mycologist and former hunting guide named "Ben" Guild. Root described Guild as 'very pro-park' in his 1976 report. He also noted that Guild had exchanged his rifle for a camera. Guild had spent six weeks in the Caldera three years earlier....Although the NPS appreciated his knowledge of the area, local residents in Port Heiden found it odd that anyone who was not there to hunt or trap would choose to live under such extreme conditions. Because of his apparent devotion to the wilderness, local villagers called Guild the 'Wild Man of Aniakchak.'

== Publications ==
- The Alaskan Mushroom Hunter's Guide (Paperback) (1977)
- The Alaska Psychoactive Mushroom Handbook (Paperback) (1979)
- Home Grown Mushrooms in Alaska (Or Anywhere Else) And How To Cook Them (Paperback) (1979)
- Cooking Alaskan (Paperback) (1983) One recipe included from Ben.
- Beyond Gorp: Favorite Foods From Outdoor Experts (Paperback) (2005) One recipe from Ben for "Boiled Fiddlehead Ferns" is on page 171.
