= Dreamatrix Game Studios =

Croatian video game developer

- Industry: Video games
- Headquarters: Zagreb, Croatia
- Parent: Dreamatrix Ltd

Dreamatrix Game Studios (also known as Provox Games) is a Croatian computer game developer. Based in Zagreb, Croatia, the studio is led by Marko Banjac and Dino Potrebica. Dreamatrix developed the games Legends of Dawn and Space Force: Rogue Universe, Wave of Darkness, Spaceforce: Captains, Spaceforce: Constellations, Spaceforce: Homeworld, Hinter Gittern, Hinter Gittern 2, Cobra 11, Happy Critters, Crocop.

== Video games ==
=== Space Force: Rogue Universe (2007) ===
Space Force: Rogue Universe was received with predominantly mixed reviews, giving it an average score of 62/100 on Metacritic. PC Format gave it 86% - a pleasant surprise but IGN gave it a mediocre rating of 51/100, abysmal storyline, excessive difficulty that prevent it from being a better game. Other publications have offered mixed reasoning, except GameSpot which gave it a 75/100 primarily because Spaceforce offers up a beautiful, dynamic universe to explore, though it suffers from a steep learning curve.

=== Legends of Dawn (2013) ===
Shortly after release on the 27th of June 2013, Legends of Dawn was panned by critics and gamers with the score of 29/100 on Metacritic. It was included in IGN's round-up of worst reviewed games of 2013, with the description: "Legends Of Dawn isn't just bad, it's an embarrassment to its developers and @steam_games for selling it." CD-Action gave it 10/100 stating: "An apology is in order to everyone who fell for the promises on Kickstarter and paid for this ruin of a game." LEVEL commented in their review: "A crappy system, technologically speaking it's an unfinished, irritating, and every now and then arrogant action RPG, with flaws as merits, demonstrating how to not make a game.", giving it 20/100.
