= Archangel (2002 video game) =

2002 video game

- Developer: Metropolis Software
- Publisher: JoWooD Productions
- Platform: Microsoft Windows
- Release: EU: October 18, 2002; NA: November 18, 2002
- Genre: Action role-playing
- Mode: Single-player

Archangel is a 2002 action role-playing video game which takes place in three different places, at three different epochs. It melds horror, science fiction, and adventure genres. It was developed by Metropolis Software and published by JoWooD Productions for the PC (Microsoft Windows) in 2002.

The player takes the role of Michael Travinsky, believed to be "the chosen one", who is sent on a holy mission. Armed with a magic sword, he must travel to three different worlds to stop the forces of evil. If he fails his mission, mankind is doomed forever.

== Gameplay ==
Archangel is controlled from a third-person perspective with the option to switch to first-person. The game features experience points, known as "essence points", which are earned by completing quests and killing enemies. They can be used to activate skills during gameplay or to purchase and upgrade skills instead. The player's main weapon, the Sword of Light, can be used as long as the bar for spirit energy remains filled. Attacking with the sword drains the bar, which slowly regenerates outside of combat and skills can speed up the process.

== Development ==
The game was in development since November 2000 with about 15 people working on it.

== Reception ==
Reception

Aggregate score
Aggregator	Score
Metacritic	49/100

Review scores
Publication	Score
4Players	65%
Computer Games Magazine	1.5/5
Computer Gaming World	2/5
Gamekult	2/10
GameStar	68%
GameZone	7/10
Jeuxvideo.com	9/20
PC Zone	58%

Archangel received "generally unfavorable reviews" according to the review aggregation website Metacritic.
