= Beam Breakers =

2002 video game

- Cover art by Michel Bohbot
- Developer: Similis
- Publisher: JoWooD Productions
- Platform: Microsoft Windows
- Release: EU: 2002; NA: October 21, 2002
- Genre: Racing
- Modes: Single player, multiplayer

Beam Breakers is a racing game released in 2002. It was published by JoWooD Productions and developed by Similis. The game takes place in the year 2173. It features flying cars in the city of New York.

== Gameplay ==
Beam Breakers has five cities in 57-mission campaigns. The player has to dodge flying cars and avoid getting caught by the flying police cars. The game also has flying car races where the player races to the first place.

== Reception ==
Reception

Aggregate score
Aggregator	Score
Metacritic	61/100

Review scores
Publication	Score
Computer Games Magazine	3/5
Computer Gaming World	2.5/5
GameSpot	5.6/10
GameSpy	2/5
GameZone	7.3/10
IGN	8/10
Jeuxvideo.com	8/20
PC Gamer (US)	79%
PC Zone	57%
X-Play	2/5

Beam Breakers received mixed reviews according to the review aggregation website Metacritic. IGN said: "Beam Breakers does manage to create and admirably deliver an enormous, believable, and simply awesome sense of scale and liveliness." However, GameSpot said, "Beam Breakers starts off with a solid concept, but it doesn't quite deliver on it. Though the game does provide a few visceral thrills, it's hard to recommend it to anyone other than someone who is hungry enough for some futuristic racing to look past the game's mediocre production values."
