= S.W.I.N.E. =

2001 video game

- Developer: StormRegion
- Publisher: Ravensburger Interactive Media
- Platform: Microsoft Windows
- Release: UK: November 9, 2001; NA: December 3, 2001
- Genre: Real-time tactics
- Modes: Single-player, multiplayer

S.W.I.N.E. (Strategic Warfare In a Nifty Environment) is a 2001 real-time tactics video game designed by Hungarian video game developer StormRegion and published by Ravensburger Interactive Media under their mature game label Fishtank Interactive. The player chooses to fight as either the brutal invading pigs or the campy rabbits, and plays a series of missions. There are many units, including mortar, artillery, and tank units. There are also 10 multiplayer maps, each with many modes of play, including capture the flag and deathmatch. In 2005, S.W.I.N.E. was made available to download for free by its developer, StormRegion. Owing to the GameSpy shutdown, multiplayer is no longer available.

The gameplay

S.W.I.N.E. HD Remaster was developed by Kite Games and released on Steam and GOG in May 2019.

== Gameplay ==
Like many other real-time tactics games, S.W.I.N.E. focuses on the tactical aspects of the battle. There is no building construction or resource gathering. Instead, the player is given a determined number of Strategic Points (or SPs) after the accomplishment of a mission, and these points can be either used to buy new units or to activate certain special abilities possessed by some units during battle. It is possible, however, to buy units during the missions.

Like many other 3D strategy games, it is possible for the player to zoom in and out of the battle, as well as rotating the camera around the battlefield. When selected, the units make random statements based on a wide variety of circumstances, such as the time of the day, the type of the terrain or their current health.

Each type of unit has its own special capabilities and weaknesses. Scouts, for instance, are great for exploring or luring the enemy and are the only unit capable of traversing water, but have little armor and do not last long on the frontline. On the other hand, tanks have both a good offensive and defensive capability but are vulnerable against units which have greater sight.

The rabbit campaign deals with the aftermath of the Pig's initial offensive and Carrotland's attempt to cut off the N.P.A. supply lines; the Pig campaign shows the final battle against the rebels of New Porkshire and the initial offensive against the Rabbits, as well as the continuation of succeeding combat operations as if the Pigs had won the war. The pig campaign is aimed at experienced players, and has a greater difficulty level compared to its rabbit counterpart.

One of the special and innovative features of the game engine is the direct display of the minimal and maximal firing range of a unit by dotted lines surrounding the unit. These lines fully adhere to the terrain just above the texture layer and are displayed in red for minimal and yellow for maximal range. While obvious, this tool from the world of turn-based strategies was most likely the first implementation in real-time tactics.

== Story ==
The city

On July 26, the Republic of the Pigs was overthrown by the General Iron Tusk. After dealing with the remaining Republican loyalist forces in his territory, Tusk turned its attention to the neighboring nation of Carrotland, home of the rabbits. On August 3, without warning, the National Army of the Pigs (also referred to as the National Pig Army) crossed the border between the two nations, and launched a brutal and swift campaign against the rabbits. Within only two weeks, they'd laid waste to Carrotland, and had its capital under siege. As a result of the intense fighting, the rabbit army is nearly decimated. Towns and villages are deserted. Carrotland's military defensive efforts haven't been crowned by success, and their reduced army cannot stop the hordes of swine. In desperation, the government and the staff of generals reach the following decision: because overwhelming Iron Tusk's war machine with a frontal attack is impossible, they would have to resort to subterfuge. From the remains of their reserves, the rabbits decided to create a powerful fighting force. Without suffering too many losses, this force must harass and sneak attack the enemy until they lose all their supply lines and military objectives. Now, all that remains is to find a capable officer who can lead this operation.

== Reception ==
Reception

Aggregate score
Aggregator	Score
Metacritic	65/100

Review scores
Publication	Score
AllGame	3/5
Computer Games Magazine	2/5
Computer Gaming World	2/5
Game Informer	8.5/10
GameSpot	7.8/10
GameSpy	66%
GameZone	7/10
IGN	6.5/10
PC Gamer (US)	65%
PC Zone	61%

The game received "mixed" reviews according to the review aggregation website Metacritic. Critics complimented its graphics and voice acting, while criticizing the unit AI.

== See also ==
- Ground Control
- Warhammer 40,000: Dawn of War
