= Europa 1400: The Guild =

2002 video game

- Developer: 4HEAD Studios
- Publisher: JoWooD Productions
- Designer: Lars Martensen
- Programmer: Tobias Severin
- Artist: Thomas Bömelt
- Composers: Gerhard Ottmer; Christoph Isermann; Lars Martensen
- Series: The Guild
- Platforms: Microsoft Windows; Nintendo DS
- Release: UK: October 18, 2002; US: October 30, 2002
- Genre: Life simulation
- Modes: Single-player, multiplayer

Europa 1400: The Guild (German: Die Gilde) is a 2002 simulation game developed by 4HEAD Studios and published by JoWooD Productions. It is the first installment in the Guild series, released in October 2002 for Windows. The game simulates medieval life combined with elements of real-time strategy, role-playing, and nonlinear gameplay using a 3D engine. Taking place in historic European cities, the player tries to guide a family dynasty to power and wealth, starting from one character of limited means. Players can choose from a total of a dozen professions.

In March 2003, an expansion pack called Europa 1400: Trade, Greediness and Intrigue, which was produced by 4HEAD Studios and developed by JoWood Productions, was released. The Guild Gold Edition, consisting of the original game and the expansion, was released in November 2005. A Nintendo DS port of The Guild was released in 2009.

== Gameplay ==
Europa 1400: The Guild is a life simulation that features realtime, role-playing and nonlinear gameplay elements, all three during combination of music between the gameplay, with the feel at home effects of the cities and set within three-dimensionally rendered open world environments. In this single-player game, the player controls a self-created protagonist with a unique name. Developed as a full 3D engine, the camera angles features a bird's-eye view, allowing to zoom and move freely around a town, to get a close look at a selected building, a NPC or an object of interest, which offer a close-up view of the interior of environments by entering, and interact with its contents and inhabitants or with exterior elements outside. The player can click on certain areas of the screen to control the viewpoint of the protagonist with the mouse and hotkeys, to explore specific places and objects, who is never on the screen. The interface is controlled by the system of left-click selecting an item or action, and a right click de-selecting.

Players are able to choose from one of 12 different career paths, and can either follow a series of missions or play the game as an open-ended simulation. The game also include a multiplayer mode for up to eight players. As the family business and social standing grows, more options become available, even high political rank.

== Development ==
The core development team of Europa 1400: The Guild consisted of about initially two employees at 4HEAD Studios in Hannover. The planning of the concept began in 1997. Led by Managing Director Lars Martensen, development began in autumn 1997, and the team grew to 10 members by spring 2002.

=== Sound ===
Europa 1400: The Guild features about two-hours-and-nine-minutes of in-game music and sound effects. Both were composed by Gerhard Ottmer, Christoph Isermann, and Lars Martensen. The disc containing 46 tracks from the game.

== Reception ==
Reception

Aggregate scores
Aggregator	Score
GameRankings	78.83%
Metacritic	82%

Review scores
Publication	Score
Computer Gaming World	4/5
Eurogamer	5/10
Game Informer	8.5/10
Action Trip	8.5/10
GameSpot	8.5/10
The Electric Playground	7.5/10
IGN	8.5/10
the-laser.com	B+
PC Gamer UK	73%
GameZone	8.3/10
PC Action	85%
Adrenaline Vault	3.5/5

Awards
Publication	Award
IGN	Editors' Choice
PC Action	Gold Award

Europa 1400: The Guild received "generally favorable" reviews upon its release, with aggregated review scores of over 8/10 at both GameRankings and Metacritic. Upon review, IGN gave Europa 1400: The Guild one of its Editor's Choice Awards, and, in its review of the game, stated: "Europa 1400 is still a fascinatingly different, complex and addictive experience. It's only fair to state that your opinion could differ, depending upon how well you can tolerate the maddening details I've discussed."

GameSpot named Europa 1400 the second-best computer game of January 2003. It was a nominee for The Electric Playground's 2002 "Best Simulation for PC" award, but lost to MechWarrior 4: Mercenaries.

The game shipped 100,000 copies in its first week, although it was first erroneously reported as having sold-through this number of units to customers.

== Sources ==
- Luo, Di (2003). "Europa 1400: The Guild - The Sims go medieval" (PDF). Computer Gaming World. No. 226. ISBN 0709920695.
- McNamara, Andrew (2003). "Europa 1400: The Guild". Game Informer. No. 118.
- Cobbett, Richard (2002). "Europa 1400: The Guild - Gilded". PC Gamer. No. 117.
