= List of THQ Nordic games =

Founded in June 2011, THQ Nordic is an Austrian video game publisher based in Vienna that acts as the primary publishing arm of Swedish holding company Embracer Group. THQ Nordic GmbH, originally Nordic Games GmbH, changed its name to THQ Nordic in 2016 to better reflect its games portfolio. The company publishes original games, ports and remasters of older intellectual property it has acquired, and licensed games based on third-party properties.

== Games published ==
Title	Platform	Release date	Developer	Ref.
Arcania: Fall of Setarrif	Microsoft Windows	24 November 2011	Spellbound Entertainment	
Painkiller: Recurring Evil	Microsoft Windows	29 February 2012	Studio Med-Art	
The Book of Unwritten Tales	macOS	29 March 2012	King Art Games	
The Book of Unwritten Tales	Linux	6 November 2012	King Art Games	
SpellForce 2: Faith in Destiny	Microsoft Windows	19 June 2012	Trine Games	
Mystery Series: A Vampire Tale	macOS	5 July 2012	SC Quantic Lab	
Mystery Series: A Vampire Tale	Microsoft Windows	5 July 2012	SC Quantic Lab	
Mystery Series: A Vampire Tale	iOS	16 February 2013	SC Quantic Lab	
Dungeon Lords: MMXII	Microsoft Windows	25 September 2012	Heuristic Park	
Painkiller: Hell & Damnation	Microsoft Windows	31 October 2012	The Farm 51	
Painkiller: Hell & Damnation	PlayStation 3	28 June 2013	The Farm 51	
Painkiller: Hell & Damnation	Xbox 360	28 June 2013	The Farm 51	
Painkiller: Hell & Damnation	Linux	16 October 2013	The Farm 51	
Painkiller: Hell & Damnation	macOS	27 May 2014	The Farm 51	
The Book of Unwritten Tales: The Critter Chronicles	Linux	5 December 2012	King Art Games	
The Book of Unwritten Tales: The Critter Chronicles	macOS	5 December 2012	King Art Games	
The Book of Unwritten Tales: The Critter Chronicles	Microsoft Windows	5 December 2012	King Art Games	
The Raven: Episode 1	Xbox 360	12 April 2013	King Art Games	
The Raven: Episode 2	Xbox 360	12 April 2013	King Art Games	
The Raven: Episode 3	Xbox 360	12 April 2013	King Art Games	
The Raven: Legacy of a Master Thief	Linux	23 July 2013	King Art Games	
The Raven: Legacy of a Master Thief	macOS	23 July 2013	King Art Games	
The Raven: Legacy of a Master Thief	Microsoft Windows	23 July 2013	King Art Games	
The Raven: Legacy of a Master Thief	PlayStation 3	8 January 2014	King Art Games	
Battle Worlds: Kronos	Linux	4 November 2013	King Art Games	
Battle Worlds: Kronos	macOS	4 November 2013	King Art Games	
Battle Worlds: Kronos	Microsoft Windows	4 November 2013	King Art Games	
Battle Worlds: Kronos	PlayStation 4	26 April 2016	King Art Games	
Battle Worlds: Kronos	Xbox One	26 April 2016	King Art Games	
Battle Worlds: Kronos	Nintendo Switch	11 June 2019	King Art Games	
Deadfall Adventures	Microsoft Windows	15 November 2013	The Farm 51	
Deadfall Adventures	Xbox 360	6 December 2013	The Farm 51	
Deadfall Adventures	Linux	6 March 2014	The Farm 51	
SpellForce 2: Demons of the Past	Microsoft Windows	16 January 2014	Mind Over Matter Studios	
MX vs. ATV: Supercross	PlayStation 3	28 October 2014	Rainbow Studios	
MX vs. ATV: Supercross	Xbox 360	28 October 2014	Rainbow Studios	
The Book of Unwritten Tales 2	Linux	20 February 2015	King Art Games	
The Book of Unwritten Tales 2	macOS	20 February 2015	King Art Games	
The Book of Unwritten Tales 2	Microsoft Windows	20 February 2015	King Art Games	
The Book of Unwritten Tales 2	PlayStation 3	18 September 2015	King Art Games	
The Book of Unwritten Tales 2	PlayStation 4	18 September 2015	King Art Games	
The Book of Unwritten Tales 2	Xbox 360	18 September 2015	King Art Games	
The Book of Unwritten Tales 2	Xbox One	18 September 2015	King Art Games	
The Book of Unwritten Tales 2	Wii U	7 June 2016	King Art Games	
Shadowrun Chronicles: Boston Lockdown	Linux	28 April 2015	Cliffhanger Productions	
Shadowrun Chronicles: Boston Lockdown	macOS	28 April 2015	Cliffhanger Productions	
Shadowrun Chronicles: Boston Lockdown	Microsoft Windows	28 April 2015	Cliffhanger Productions	
Legend of Kay: Anniversary	macOS	28 July 2015	Kaiko	
Legend of Kay: Anniversary	Microsoft Windows	28 July 2015	Kaiko	
Legend of Kay: Anniversary	PlayStation 3	28 July 2015	Kaiko	
Legend of Kay: Anniversary	Xbox 360	28 July 2015	Kaiko	
Legend of Kay: Anniversary	PlayStation 4	29 July 2015	Kaiko	
Legend of Kay: Anniversary	Wii U	29 July 2015	Kaiko	
MX vs. ATV Supercross Encore	Microsoft Windows	27 October 2015	Rainbow Studios	
MX vs. ATV Supercross Encore	PlayStation 4	27 October 2015	Rainbow Studios	
MX vs. ATV Supercross Encore	Xbox One	15 July 2016	BlitWorks	
Darksiders II: Deathinitive Edition	PlayStation 4	30 October 2015	Gunfire Games	
Darksiders II: Deathinitive Edition	Xbox One	30 October 2015	Gunfire Games	
Darksiders II: Deathinitive Edition	Microsoft Windows	5 November 2015	Gunfire Games	
Darksiders II: Deathinitive Edition	Nintendo Switch	26 September 2019	Gunfire Games	
Darksiders II: Deathinitive Edition	Stadia	1 September 2021	Gunfire Games	
This Is the Police	Linux	2 August 2016	Weappy	
This Is the Police	Microsoft Windows	2 August 2016	Weappy	
This Is the Police	macOS	8 September 2016	Weappy	
This Is the Police	PlayStation 4	22 March 2017	Weappy	
This Is the Police	Xbox One	22 March 2017	Weappy	
This Is the Police	Nintendo Switch	5 December 2017	Weappy	
Titan Quest: Anniversary Edition	Microsoft Windows	31 August 2016	Black Forest Games	
Darksiders: Warmastered Edition	PlayStation 4	22 November 2016	Kaiko	
Darksiders: Warmastered Edition	Xbox One	22 November 2016	Kaiko	
Darksiders: Warmastered Edition	Microsoft Windows	29 November 2016	Kaiko	
Darksiders: Warmastered Edition	Wii U	23 May 2017	Kaiko	
Darksiders: Warmastered Edition	Nintendo Switch	2 April 2019	Kaiko	
Darksiders: Warmastered Edition	GeForce Now	22 April 2021	Kaiko	
We Sing	PlayStation 4	1 December 2016	Le Cortex	
De Blob	Microsoft Windows	27 April 2017	BlitWorks	
De Blob	PlayStation 4	14 November 2017	BlitWorks	
De Blob	Xbox One	14 November 2017	BlitWorks	
De Blob	Nintendo Switch	26 June 2018	BlitWorks	
Lock's Quest	Linux	30 May 2017	Digital Continue	
Lock's Quest	macOS	30 May 2017	Digital Continue	
Lock's Quest	Microsoft Windows	30 May 2017	Digital Continue	
Lock's Quest	PlayStation 4	30 May 2017	Digital Continue	
Lock's Quest	Xbox One	30 May 2017	Digital Continue	
Neighbours from Hell: Season One	Android	30 May 2017	Big Moon Entertainment	
Neighbours from Hell: Season One	iOS	30 May 2017	Big Moon Entertainment	
De Blob 2	Microsoft Windows	22 June 2017	BlitWorks	
De Blob 2	PlayStation 4	27 February 2018	BlitWorks	
De Blob 2	Xbox One	27 February 2018	BlitWorks	
De Blob 2	Nintendo Switch	28 August 2018	BlitWorks	
Sine Mora EX	Microsoft Windows	8 August 2017	Digital Reality	
Sine Mora EX	PlayStation 4	8 August 2017	Digital Reality	
Sine Mora EX	Xbox One	8 August 2017	Digital Reality	
Sine Mora EX	Nintendo Switch	26 September 2017	Digital Reality	
Snipers vs. Thieves	Android	17 August 2017	Foxglove Studios	
Snipers vs. Thieves	iOS	17 August 2017	Foxglove Studios	
Puzzle Pests	Android	28 August 2017	Foxglove Studios	
Puzzle Pests	iOS	28 August 2017	Foxglove Studios	
Baja: Edge of Control HD	Microsoft Windows	14 September 2017	2XL Games	
Baja: Edge of Control HD	PlayStation 4	14 September 2017	BlitWorks	
Baja: Edge of Control HD	Xbox One	14 September 2017	BlitWorks	
Battle Chasers: Nightwar	macOS	3 October 2017	Airship Syndicate	
Battle Chasers: Nightwar	Microsoft Windows	3 October 2017	Airship Syndicate	
Battle Chasers: Nightwar	PlayStation 4	3 October 2017	Airship Syndicate	
Battle Chasers: Nightwar	Xbox One	3 October 2017	Airship Syndicate	
Battle Chasers: Nightwar	Nintendo Switch	15 May 2018	Airship Syndicate	
Battle Chasers: Nightwar	Linux	28 May 2018	Airship Syndicate	
ELEX	Microsoft Windows	17 October 2017	Piranha Bytes	
ELEX	PlayStation 4	17 October 2017	Piranha Bytes	
ELEX	Xbox One	17 October 2017	Piranha Bytes	
We Sing Pop!	PlayStation 4	24 October 2017	Le Cortex	
We Sing Pop!	Xbox One	24 October 2017	Le Cortex	
The Muscle Hustle	Android	1 November 2017	Foxglove Studios	
The Muscle Hustle	iOS	1 November 2017	Foxglove Studios	
Sphinx and the Cursed Mummy	Linux	10 November 2017	Eurocom Developments	
Sphinx and the Cursed Mummy	macOS	10 November 2017	Eurocom Developments	
Sphinx and the Cursed Mummy	Microsoft Windows	10 November 2017	Eurocom Developments	
Sphinx and the Cursed Mummy	Nintendo Switch	29 January 2019	Eurocom Developments	
Titan Quest: Ragnarök	Microsoft Windows	17 November 2017	Pieces Interactive	
Titan Quest: Ragnarök	PlayStation 4	24 March 2020	Pieces Interactive	
Titan Quest: Ragnarök	Xbox One	24 March 2020	Pieces Interactive	
Titan Quest: Ragnarök	Nintendo Switch	30 June 2020	Pieces Interactive	
Black Mirror	Linux	28 November 2017	King Art Games	
Black Mirror	macOS	28 November 2017	King Art Games	
Black Mirror	Microsoft Windows	28 November 2017	King Art Games	
Black Mirror	PlayStation 4	28 November 2017	King Art Games	
Black Mirror	Xbox One	28 November 2017	King Art Games	
SpellForce 3	Microsoft Windows	7 December 2017	Grimlore Games	
Rad Rodgers	Microsoft Windows	21 February 2018	Slipgate Studios / 3D Realms	
Rad Rodgers	PlayStation 4	21 February 2018	Slipgate Studios / 3D Realms	
Rad Rodgers	Xbox One	21 February 2018	Slipgate Studios / 3D Realms	
The Raven Remastered	Linux	13 March 2018	King Art Games	
The Raven Remastered	macOS	13 March 2018	King Art Games	
The Raven Remastered	Microsoft Windows	13 March 2018	King Art Games	
The Raven Remastered	PlayStation 4	13 March 2018	King Art Games	
The Raven Remastered	Xbox One	13 March 2018	King Art Games	
The Raven Remastered	Nintendo Switch	22 January 2019	King Art Games	
Titan Quest	PlayStation 4	20 March 2018	Black Forest Games	
Titan Quest	Xbox One	20 March 2018	Black Forest Games	
Titan Quest	Nintendo Switch	31 July 2018	Black Forest Games	
MX vs. ATV All Out	Microsoft Windows	27 March 2018	Rainbow Studios	
MX vs. ATV All Out	PlayStation 4	27 March 2018	Rainbow Studios	
MX vs. ATV All Out	Xbox One	27 March 2018	Rainbow Studios	
MX vs. ATV All Out	Nintendo Switch	1 September 2020	Rainbow Studios	
Legend of Kay: Anniversary	Nintendo Switch	29 May 2018	Kaiko	
Wreckfest	Microsoft Windows	14 June 2018	Bugbear Entertainment	
Wreckfest	PlayStation 4	27 August 2019	Bugbear Entertainment	
Wreckfest	Xbox One	27 August 2019	Bugbear Entertainment	
Wreckfest	PlayStation 5	1 June 2021	Bugbear Entertainment	
Wreckfest	Xbox Series X/S	1 June 2021	Bugbear Entertainment	
Wreckfest	Stadia	1 December 2021	Bugbear Entertainment	
Wreckfest	Nintendo Switch	21 June 2022	Bugbear Entertainment	
Red Faction: Guerrilla – Re-Mars-tered	Microsoft Windows	3 July 2018	Kaiko	
Red Faction: Guerrilla – Re-Mars-tered	PlayStation 4	3 July 2018	Kaiko	
Red Faction: Guerrilla – Re-Mars-tered	Xbox One	3 July 2018	Kaiko	
Red Faction: Guerrilla – Re-Mars-tered	Nintendo Switch	2 July 2019	Kaiko	
This Is the Police 2	Linux	31 July 2018	Weappy	
This Is the Police 2	macOS	31 July 2018	Weappy	
This Is the Police 2	Microsoft Windows	31 July 2018	Weappy	
This Is the Police 2	Nintendo Switch	25 September 2018	Weappy	
This Is the Police 2	PlayStation 4	25 September 2018	Weappy	
This Is the Police 2	Xbox One	25 September 2018	Weappy	
Darksiders III	Microsoft Windows	27 November 2018	Gunfire Games	
Darksiders III	PlayStation 4	27 November 2018	Gunfire Games	
Darksiders III	Xbox One	27 November 2018	Gunfire Games	
Darksiders III	Nintendo Switch	30 September 2021	Gunfire Games	
Jagged Alliance: Rage!	Microsoft Windows	6 December 2018	Cliffhanger Productions	
Jagged Alliance: Rage!	PlayStation 4	6 December 2018	Cliffhanger Productions	
Jagged Alliance: Rage!	Xbox One	6 December 2018	Cliffhanger Productions	
The Book of Unwritten Tales 2	Nintendo Switch	5 February 2019	King Art Games	
Darksiders III: The Crucible	Microsoft Windows	26 February 2019	Gunfire Games	
Darksiders III: The Crucible	PlayStation 4	26 February 2019	Gunfire Games	
Darksiders III: The Crucible	Xbox One	26 February 2019	Gunfire Games	
Fade to Silence	Microsoft Windows	30 April 2019	Black Forest Games / Ringtail Studios Estonia	
Fade to Silence	PlayStation 4	30 April 2019	Black Forest Games / Ringtail Studios Estonia	
Fade to Silence	Xbox One	30 April 2019	Black Forest Games / Ringtail Studios Estonia	
Titan Quest: Atlantis	Microsoft Windows	9 May 2019	Pieces Interactive	
Titan Quest: Atlantis	PlayStation 4	31 March 2020	Pieces Interactive	
Titan Quest: Atlantis	Xbox One	31 March 2020	Pieces Interactive	
Titan Quest: Atlantis	Nintendo Switch	23 June 2020	Pieces Interactive	
SpellForce 3: Soul Harvest	Microsoft Windows	28 May 2019	Grimlore Games	
Monster Jam: Steel Titans	Microsoft Windows	25 June 2019	Rainbow Studios	
Monster Jam: Steel Titans	PlayStation 4	25 June 2019	Rainbow Studios	
Monster Jam: Steel Titans	Xbox One	25 June 2019	Rainbow Studios	
Monster Jam: Steel Titans	Nintendo Switch	13 November 2019	Rainbow Studios	
Monster Jam: Steel Titans	Stadia	1 December 2020	Rainbow Studios	
Darksiders III: Keepers of the Void	Microsoft Windows	16 July 2019	Gunfire Games	
Darksiders III: Keepers of the Void	PlayStation 4	16 July 2019	Gunfire Games	
Darksiders III: Keepers of the Void	Xbox One	16 July 2019	Gunfire Games	
Rebel Cops	Microsoft Windows	17 September 2019	Weappy	
Rebel Cops	Nintendo Switch	17 September 2019	Weappy	
Rebel Cops	PlayStation 4	17 September 2019	Weappy	
Rebel Cops	Xbox One	17 September 2019	Weappy	
Monkey King: Hero Is Back	Microsoft Windows	17 October 2019	HexaDrive / DEC / Virtuos	
Monkey King: Hero Is Back	PlayStation 4	17 October 2019	HexaDrive / DEC / Virtuos	
Monkey King: Hero Is Back - Uproar in Heaven	Microsoft Windows	21 November 2019	HexaDrive	
Monkey King: Hero Is Back - Uproar in Heaven	PlayStation 4	21 November 2019	HexaDrive	
Darksiders Genesis	Stadia	5 December 2019	Airship Syndicate	
Darksiders Genesis	Microsoft Windows	5 December 2019	Airship Syndicate	
Darksiders Genesis	Nintendo Switch	14 February 2020	Airship Syndicate	
Darksiders Genesis	PlayStation 4	14 February 2020	Airship Syndicate	
Darksiders Genesis	Xbox One	14 February 2020	Airship Syndicate	
Monkey King: Hero Is Back - Mind Palace	Microsoft Windows	19 December 2019	HexaDrive	
Monkey King: Hero Is Back - Mind Palace	PlayStation 4	19 December 2019	HexaDrive	
DCL - The Game	Microsoft Windows	18 February 2020	Climax Studios	
DCL - The Game	PlayStation 4	18 February 2020	Climax Studios	
DCL - The Game	Xbox One	18 February 2020	Climax Studios	
Desperados III	Microsoft Windows	16 June 2020	Mimimi Games	
Desperados III	PlayStation 4	16 June 2020	Mimimi Games	
Desperados III	Xbox One	16 June 2020	Mimimi Games	
SpongeBob SquarePants: Battle for Bikini Bottom – Rehydrated	Microsoft Windows	23 June 2020	Purple Lamp Studios	
SpongeBob SquarePants: Battle for Bikini Bottom – Rehydrated	Nintendo Switch	23 June 2020	Purple Lamp Studios	
SpongeBob SquarePants: Battle for Bikini Bottom – Rehydrated	PlayStation 4	23 June 2020	Purple Lamp Studios	
SpongeBob SquarePants: Battle for Bikini Bottom – Rehydrated	Xbox One	23 June 2020	Purple Lamp Studios	
SpongeBob SquarePants: Battle for Bikini Bottom – Rehydrated	Stadia	8 December 2020	Purple Lamp Studios	
Destroy All Humans!	Microsoft Windows	28 July 2020	Black Forest Games	
Destroy All Humans!	PlayStation 4	28 July 2020	Black Forest Games	
Destroy All Humans!	Xbox One	28 July 2020	Black Forest Games	
Destroy All Humans!	Stadia	8 December 2020	Black Forest Games	
Destroy All Humans!	Nintendo Switch	29 June 2021	Black Forest Games	
Destroy All Humans!	Nintendo Switch 2	23 June 2026	Black Forest Games	
Kingdoms of Amalur: Re-Reckoning	Microsoft Windows	8 September 2020	Kaiko	
Kingdoms of Amalur: Re-Reckoning	PlayStation 4	8 September 2020	Kaiko	
Kingdoms of Amalur: Re-Reckoning	Xbox One	8 September 2020	Kaiko	
Kingdoms of Amalur: Re-Reckoning	Nintendo Switch	16 March 2021	Kaiko	
AquaNox: Deep Descent	Microsoft Windows	16 October 2020	Digital Arrow	
SpellForce 3: Fallen God	Microsoft Windows	3 November 2020	Grimlore Games	
SpellForce 3: Versus	Microsoft Windows	3 November 2020	Grimlore Games	
Chronos: Before the Ashes	Stadia	1 December 2020	Gunfire Games	
Chronos: Before the Ashes	Microsoft Windows	1 December 2020	Gunfire Games	
Chronos: Before the Ashes	Nintendo Switch	1 December 2020	Gunfire Games	
Chronos: Before the Ashes	PlayStation 4	1 December 2020	Gunfire Games	
Chronos: Before the Ashes	Xbox One	1 December 2020	Gunfire Games	
Monster Jam: Steel Titans 2	Stadia	2 March 2021	Rainbow Studios	
Monster Jam: Steel Titans 2	Microsoft Windows	2 March 2021	Rainbow Studios	
Monster Jam: Steel Titans 2	Nintendo Switch	2 March 2021	Rainbow Studios	
Monster Jam: Steel Titans 2	PlayStation 4	2 March 2021	Rainbow Studios	
Monster Jam: Steel Titans 2	Xbox One	2 March 2021	Rainbow Studios	
Biomutant	Microsoft Windows	25 May 2021	Experiment 101	
Biomutant	PlayStation 4	25 May 2021	Experiment 101	
Biomutant	Xbox One	25 May 2021	Experiment 101	
Biomutant	PlayStation 5	6 September 2022	Experiment 101	
Biomutant	Xbox Series X/S	6 September 2022	Experiment 101	
Biomutant	Nintendo Switch	30 November 2023	Experiment 101	
We Are Football	Microsoft Windows	10 June 2021	Winning Streak Games	
Comanche	Microsoft Windows	26 August 2021	Ashborne Games	
Titan Quest: Eternal Embers	Microsoft Windows	3 December 2021	Digital Arrow	
This Is the President	Microsoft Windows	6 December 2021	Super PAC	
This Is the President	Linux	9 December 2021	Super PAC	
This Is the President	macOS	9 December 2021	Super PAC	
Kingdoms of Amalur: Re-Reckoning – Fatesworn	Microsoft Windows	14 December 2021	Kaiko	
Kingdoms of Amalur: Re-Reckoning – Fatesworn	PlayStation 4	14 December 2021	Kaiko	
Kingdoms of Amalur: Re-Reckoning – Fatesworn	Xbox One	14 December 2021	Kaiko	
Kingdoms of Amalur: Re-Reckoning – Fatesworn	Nintendo Switch	TBA	Kaiko	
Expeditions: Rome	Microsoft Windows	20 January 2022	Logic Artists	
ELEX II	Microsoft Windows	1 March 2022	Piranha Bytes	
ELEX II	PlayStation 4	1 March 2022	Piranha Bytes	
ELEX II	PlayStation 5	1 March 2022	Piranha Bytes	
ELEX II	Xbox One	1 March 2022	Piranha Bytes	
ELEX II	Xbox Series X/S	1 March 2022	Piranha Bytes	
ELEX II	GeForce Now	3 March 2022	Piranha Bytes	
Destroy All Humans!: Clone Carnage	Microsoft Windows	1 June 2022	Black Forest Games	
Destroy All Humans!: Clone Carnage	PlayStation 4	1 June 2022	Black Forest Games	
Destroy All Humans!: Clone Carnage	Xbox One	1 June 2022	Black Forest Games	
SpellForce 3: Reforced	PlayStation 4	7 June 2022	BlitWorks	
SpellForce 3: Reforced	PlayStation 5	7 June 2022	BlitWorks	
SpellForce 3: Reforced	Xbox One	7 June 2022	BlitWorks	
SpellForce 3: Reforced	Xbox Series X/S	7 June 2022	BlitWorks	
SpellForce 3: Reforced – Fallen God	PlayStation 4	7 June 2022	BlitWorks	
SpellForce 3: Reforced – Fallen God	PlayStation 5	7 June 2022	BlitWorks	
SpellForce 3: Reforced – Fallen God	Xbox One	7 June 2022	BlitWorks	
SpellForce 3: Reforced – Fallen God	Xbox Series X/S	7 June 2022	BlitWorks	
SpellForce 3: Reforced – Soul Harvest	PlayStation 4	7 June 2022	BlitWorks	
SpellForce 3: Reforced – Soul Harvest	PlayStation 5	7 June 2022	BlitWorks	
SpellForce 3: Reforced – Soul Harvest	Xbox One	7 June 2022	BlitWorks	
SpellForce 3: Reforced – Soul Harvest	Xbox Series X/S	7 June 2022	BlitWorks	
The Guild 3	Microsoft Windows	14 June 2022	Purple Lamp Studios	
The Guild 3	GeForce Now	14 June 2022	Purple Lamp Studios	
MX vs. ATV Legends	Microsoft Windows	28 June 2022	Rainbow Studios	
MX vs. ATV Legends	PlayStation 4	28 June 2022	Rainbow Studios	
MX vs. ATV Legends	PlayStation 5	28 June 2022	Rainbow Studios	
MX vs. ATV Legends	Xbox One	28 June 2022	Rainbow Studios	
MX vs. ATV Legends	Xbox Series X/S	28 June 2022	Rainbow Studios	
MX vs. ATV Legends: 2022 AMA Pro Motocross Championship	Microsoft Windows	28 June 2022	Rainbow Studios	
MX vs. ATV Legends: 2022 AMA Pro Motocross Championship	PlayStation 4	28 June 2022	Rainbow Studios	
MX vs. ATV Legends: 2022 AMA Pro Motocross Championship	PlayStation 5	28 June 2022	Rainbow Studios	
MX vs. ATV Legends: 2022 AMA Pro Motocross Championship	Xbox One	28 June 2022	Rainbow Studios	
MX vs. ATV Legends: 2022 AMA Pro Motocross Championship	Xbox Series X/S	28 June 2022	Rainbow Studios	
Way of the Hunter	Microsoft Windows	16 August 2022	Nine Rocks Games	
Way of the Hunter	PlayStation 5	16 August 2022	Nine Rocks Games	
Way of the Hunter	Xbox Series X/S	16 August 2022	Nine Rocks Games	
Destroy All Humans! 2: Reprobed	Microsoft Windows	30 August 2022	Black Forest Games	
Destroy All Humans! 2: Reprobed	PlayStation 5	30 August 2022	Black Forest Games	
Destroy All Humans! 2: Reprobed	Xbox Series X/S	30 August 2022	Black Forest Games	
Destroy All Humans! 2: Reprobed	PlayStation 4	27 June 2023	Black Forest Games	
Destroy All Humans! 2: Reprobed	Xbox One	27 June 2023	Black Forest Games	
Destroy All Humans! 2: Reprobed	Nintendo Switch 2	15 September 2026	Black Forest Games	
SuperPower 3	Microsoft Windows	7 October 2022	GolemLabs	
The Valiant	Microsoft Windows	19 October 2022	Kite Games	
MX vs. ATV Legends: Supercross World Tour	Microsoft Windows	8 November 2022	Rainbow Studios	
MX vs. ATV Legends: Supercross World Tour	PlayStation 4	8 November 2022	Rainbow Studios	
MX vs. ATV Legends: Supercross World Tour	PlayStation 5	8 November 2022	Rainbow Studios	
MX vs. ATV Legends: Supercross World Tour	Xbox One	8 November 2022	Rainbow Studios	
MX vs. ATV Legends: Supercross World Tour	Xbox Series X/S	8 November 2022	Rainbow Studios	
We Are Football: National Teams	Microsoft Windows	14 November 2022	Winning Streak Games	
Knights of Honor II: Sovereign	Microsoft Windows	6 December 2022	Black Sea Games	
Risen	Nintendo Switch	24 January 2023	Piranha Bytes	
Risen	PlayStation 4	24 January 2023	Piranha Bytes	
Risen	Xbox One	24 January 2023	Piranha Bytes	
SpongeBob SquarePants: The Cosmic Shake	Microsoft Windows	31 January 2023	Purple Lamp Studios	
SpongeBob SquarePants: The Cosmic Shake	Nintendo Switch	31 January 2023	Purple Lamp Studios	
SpongeBob SquarePants: The Cosmic Shake	PlayStation 4	31 January 2023	Purple Lamp Studios	
SpongeBob SquarePants: The Cosmic Shake	Xbox One	31 January 2023	Purple Lamp Studios	
SpongeBob SquarePants: The Cosmic Shake	PlayStation 5	23 October 2023	Purple Lamp Studios	
SpongeBob SquarePants: The Cosmic Shake	Xbox Series X/S	23 October 2023	Purple Lamp Studios	
SpongeBob SquarePants: The Cosmic Shake	iOS	12 December 2023	Purple Lamp Studios	
SpongeBob SquarePants: The Cosmic Shake	Android	21 December 2023	Purple Lamp Studios	
SpellForce: Conquest of Eo	Microsoft Windows	3 February 2023	Owned by Gravity	
Jected - Rivals	Microsoft Windows	4 May 2023	Pow Wow Entertainment	
AEW Fight Forever	Microsoft Windows	29 June 2023	Yuke's	
AEW Fight Forever	Nintendo Switch	29 June 2023	Yuke's	
AEW Fight Forever	PlayStation 4	29 June 2023	Yuke's	
AEW Fight Forever	PlayStation 5	29 June 2023	Yuke's	
AEW Fight Forever	Xbox One	29 June 2023	Yuke's	
AEW Fight Forever	Xbox Series X/S	29 June 2023	Yuke's	
Jagged Alliance 3	Microsoft Windows	14 July 2023	Haemimont Games	
Jagged Alliance 3	PlayStation 4	16 November 2023	Haemimont Games	
Jagged Alliance 3	PlayStation 5	16 November 2023	Haemimont Games	
Jagged Alliance 3	Xbox One	16 November 2023	Haemimont Games	
Jagged Alliance 3	Xbox Series X/S	16 November 2023	Haemimont Games	
Trine 5: A Clockwork Conspiracy	Microsoft Windows	31 August 2023	Frozenbyte	
Trine 5: A Clockwork Conspiracy	Nintendo Switch	31 August 2023	Frozenbyte	
Trine 5: A Clockwork Conspiracy	PlayStation 4	31 August 2023	Frozenbyte	
Trine 5: A Clockwork Conspiracy	PlayStation 5	31 August 2023	Frozenbyte	
Trine 5: A Clockwork Conspiracy	Xbox One	31 August 2023	Frozenbyte	
Trine 5: A Clockwork Conspiracy	Xbox Series X/S	31 August 2023	Frozenbyte	
Gothic Classic	Nintendo Switch	28 September 2023	Piranha Bytes	
Gothic Classic	PlayStation 4	28 July 2026	Piranha Bytes	
Gothic Classic	PlayStation 5	28 July 2026	Piranha Bytes	
Gothic Classic	Xbox One	28 July 2026	Piranha Bytes	
Gothic Classic	Xbox Series X/S	28 July 2026	Piranha Bytes	
Last Train Home	Microsoft Windows	28 November 2023	Ashborne Games	
Gothic II Complete Classic	Nintendo Switch	29 November 2023	Piranha Bytes	
Gothic II Complete Classic	PlayStation 4	29 September 2026	Piranha Bytes	
Gothic II Complete Classic	PlayStation 5	29 September 2026	Piranha Bytes	
Gothic II Complete Classic	Xbox One	29 September 2026	Piranha Bytes	
Gothic II Complete Classic	Xbox Series X/S	29 September 2026	Piranha Bytes	
Outcast: A New Beginning	Microsoft Windows	15 March 2024	Appeal Studios	
Outcast: A New Beginning	PlayStation 5	15 March 2024	Appeal Studios	
Outcast: A New Beginning	Xbox Series X/S	15 March 2024	Appeal Studios	
Alone in the Dark	Microsoft Windows	20 March 2024	Pieces Interactive	
Alone in the Dark	PlayStation 5	20 March 2024	Pieces Interactive	
Alone in the Dark	Xbox Series X/S	20 March 2024	Pieces Interactive	
South Park: Snow Day!	Microsoft Windows	26 March 2024	Question, South Park Digital Studios	
South Park: Snow Day!	Nintendo Switch	26 March 2024	Question, South Park Digital Studios	
South Park: Snow Day!	PlayStation 5	26 March 2024	Question, South Park Digital Studios	
South Park: Snow Day!	Xbox Series X/S	26 March 2024	Question, South Park Digital Studios	
Epic Mickey: Rebrushed	Microsoft Windows	24 September 2024	Purple Lamp Studios	
Epic Mickey: Rebrushed	Nintendo Switch	24 September 2024	Purple Lamp Studios	
Epic Mickey: Rebrushed	PlayStation 4	24 September 2024	Purple Lamp Studios	
Epic Mickey: Rebrushed	PlayStation 5	24 September 2024	Purple Lamp Studios	
Epic Mickey: Rebrushed	Xbox One	24 September 2024	Purple Lamp Studios	
Epic Mickey: Rebrushed	Xbox Series X/S	24 September 2024	Purple Lamp Studios	
Epic Mickey: Rebrushed	Android	16 September 2026	Purple Lamp Studios	
Epic Mickey: Rebrushed	iOS	16 September 2026	Purple Lamp Studios	
Epic Mickey: Rebrushed	Nintendo Switch 2	6 October 2026	Purple Lamp Studios	
Locomoto	Microsoft Windows	8 April 2025	Green Tile Digital	
Locomoto	Nintendo Switch	26 June 2025	Green Tile Digital	
Wreckreation	Microsoft Windows	28 October 2025	Three Fields Entertainment	
Wreckreation	PlayStation 5	28 October 2025	Three Fields Entertainment	
Wreckreation	Xbox Series X/S	28 October 2025	Three Fields Entertainment	
Sacred 2 Remaster	Microsoft Windows	11 November 2025	SparklingBit, Funatics	
Sacred 2 Remaster	PlayStation 5	11 November 2025	SparklingBit, Funatics	
Sacred 2 Remaster	Xbox Series X/S	11 November 2025	SparklingBit, Funatics	
Sacred 2 Remaster	Nintendo Switch	11 August 2026	SparklingBit, Funatics	
SpongeBob SquarePants: Titans of the Tide	Microsoft Windows	18 November 2025	Purple Lamp Studios	
SpongeBob SquarePants: Titans of the Tide	Nintendo Switch 2	18 November 2025	Purple Lamp Studios	
SpongeBob SquarePants: Titans of the Tide	PlayStation 5	18 November 2025	Purple Lamp Studios	
SpongeBob SquarePants: Titans of the Tide	Xbox Series X/S	18 November 2025	Purple Lamp Studios	
Reanimal	Microsoft Windows	13 February 2026	Tarsier Studios	
Reanimal	Nintendo Switch 2	13 February 2026	Tarsier Studios	
Reanimal	PlayStation 5	13 February 2026	Tarsier Studios	
Reanimal	Xbox Series X/S	13 February 2026	Tarsier Studios	
Pumuckl and the Crown of the Pirate King	Microsoft Windows	5 March 2026	Quantumfrog	
Pumuckl and the Crown of the Pirate King	Nintendo Switch	5 March 2026	Quantumfrog	
Tides of Tomorrow	Microsoft Windows	22 April 2026	DigixArt	
Tides of Tomorrow	PlayStation 5	22 April 2026	DigixArt	
Tides of Tomorrow	Xbox Series X/S	22 April 2026	DigixArt	
Gothic 1 Remake	Microsoft Windows	5 June 2026	Alkimia Interactive, Gate21	
Gothic 1 Remake	PlayStation 5	5 June 2026	Alkimia Interactive, Gate21	
Gothic 1 Remake	Xbox Series X/S	5 June 2026	Alkimia Interactive, Gate21	
Way of the Hunter 2	Microsoft Windows	29 September 2026	Nine Rocks Games	
Way of the Hunter 2	PlayStation 5	29 September 2026	Nine Rocks Games	
Way of the Hunter 2	Xbox Series X/S	29 September 2026	Nine Rocks Games	
Gothic 3 Classic	Nintendo Switch 2	24 November 2026	Piranha Bytes	
Gothic 3 Classic	PlayStation 5	24 November 2026	Piranha Bytes	
Gothic 3 Classic	Xbox Series X/S	24 November 2026	Piranha Bytes	
Titan Quest II	Microsoft Windows	19 January 2027	Grimlore Games	
Titan Quest II	PlayStation 5	19 January 2027	Grimlore Games	
Titan Quest II	Xbox Series X/S	19 January 2027	Grimlore Games	
Expeditions: Samurai	Microsoft Windows	TBA	Campfire Cabal	
Space for Sale	Microsoft Windows	TBA	Mirage Game Studios	
The Eternal Life of Goldman	Microsoft Windows	TBA	Weappy	
The Eternal Life of Goldman	Nintendo Switch	TBA	Weappy	
The Eternal Life of Goldman	PlayStation 5	TBA	Weappy	
The Eternal Life of Goldman	Xbox Series X/S	TBA	Weappy	
Wreckfest 2	Microsoft Windows	TBA	Bugbear Entertainment	
Wreckfest 2	PlayStation 5	TBA	Bugbear Entertainment	
Wreckfest 2	Xbox Series X/S	TBA	Bugbear Entertainment	
The Guild Remake – Europa 1410	Microsoft Windows	TBA	Ashborne Games	
Fatekeeper	Microsoft Windows	TBA	Paraglacial	
Darksiders 4	Microsoft Windows	TBA	Gunfire Games	
Darksiders 4	PlayStation 5	TBA	Gunfire Games	
Darksiders 4	Xbox Series X/S	TBA	Gunfire Games	
Untitled Road 96 Project	TBA	TBA	DigixArt	

== Games distributed ==
Title	Platform	Release date	Developer	Ref.
Rochard	Microsoft Windows	15 November 2011	Recoil Games	
Aura: Fate of the Ages	Microsoft Windows	13 December 2011	Streko Graphics	
The Sacred Rings	Microsoft Windows	13 December 2011	Streko Graphics	
AquaNox	Microsoft Windows	15 December 2011	Massive Development	
AquaNox 2: Revelation	Microsoft Windows	15 December 2011	Massive Development	
Painkiller	Microsoft Windows	19 December 2011	People Can Fly	
Painkiller: Battle Out of Hell	Microsoft Windows	19 December 2011	People Can Fly	
Painkiller: Overdose	Microsoft Windows	19 December 2011	Mindware Studios	
Painkiller: Redemption	Microsoft Windows	19 December 2011	Eggtooth Team / Homegrown Games	
Painkiller: Resurrection	Microsoft Windows	19 December 2011	Homegrown Games	
Dunes of War	Microsoft Windows	27 December 2011	ZootFly	
First Battalion	Microsoft Windows	27 December 2011	ZootFly	
Panzer Elite	Microsoft Windows	27 December 2011	Wings Simulations	
Alan Wake	Microsoft Windows	2 March 2012	Remedy Entertainment	
Gothic	Microsoft Windows	25 May 2012	Piranha Bytes	
Gothic II	Microsoft Windows	25 May 2012	Piranha Bytes	
Gothic II: Night of the Raven	Microsoft Windows	25 May 2012	Piranha Bytes	
Gothic 3	Microsoft Windows	25 May 2012	Piranha Bytes	
Gothic 3: Forsaken Gods	Microsoft Windows	25 May 2012	Trine Games	
Alan Wake's American Nightmare	Microsoft Windows	19 June 2012	Nitro Games	
Red Faction	Microsoft Windows	11 February 2013	Volition	
Jack Keane 2: The Fire Within	Microsoft Windows	28 June 2013	Deck 13 Interactive	
Neighbours from Hell	Microsoft Windows	7 November 2013	JoWood Vienna	
Neighbours from Hell: On Vacation	Microsoft Windows	7 November 2013	JoWood Vienna	
Cold War	Microsoft Windows	8 January 2014	Mindware Studios	
Legend of Kay	PlayStation 2 Classics on PlayStation 3	29 January 2014	Neon Software	
Red Faction II	Microsoft Windows	11 February 2014	Outrage Games	
Summoner	Microsoft Windows	12 March 2014	Volition	
SuperPower 2: Steam Edition	Microsoft Windows	18 April 2014	GolemLabs	
Costume Quest	Linux	25 April 2014	Double Fine Productions	
Costume Quest	macOS	25 April 2014	Double Fine Productions	
Costume Quest	Microsoft Windows	25 April 2014	Double Fine Productions	
Psychonauts	Linux	25 April 2014	Double Fine Productions	
Psychonauts	macOS	25 April 2014	Double Fine Productions	
Psychonauts	Microsoft Windows	25 April 2014	Double Fine Productions	
Stacking	Linux	25 April 2014	Double Fine Productions	
Stacking	macOS	25 April 2014	Double Fine Productions	
Stacking	Microsoft Windows	25 April 2014	Double Fine Productions	
Railroad Pioneer	Microsoft Windows	2 July 2014	Kritzelkratz 3000	
The Black Mirror	Microsoft Windows	3 July 2014	Future Games / Unknown Identity	
Black Mirror II: Reigning Evil	Microsoft Windows	22 July 2014	Cranberry Productions / King Art Games	
Planetary Annihilation	Linux	5 September 2014	Uber Entertainment	
Planetary Annihilation	macOS	5 September 2014	Uber Entertainment	
Planetary Annihilation	Microsoft Windows	5 September 2014	Uber Entertainment	
Die Gilde: Gaukler, Gruften & Geschütze	Microsoft Windows	9 September 2014	4HEAD Studios	
Europa 1400: The Guild	Microsoft Windows	9 September 2014	4HEAD Studios	
The Guild 2	Microsoft Windows	9 September 2014	4HEAD Studios	
The Guild 2: Pirates of the European Seas	Microsoft Windows	9 September 2014	4HEAD Studios	
The Guild 2: Renaissance	Microsoft Windows	9 September 2014	RuneForge Game Studio	
The Guild 2: Venice	Microsoft Windows	9 September 2014	4HEAD Studios	
The Vanishing of Ethan Carter	Microsoft Windows	26 September 2014	The Astronauts	
Jagged Alliance: Flashback	Linux	21 October 2014	Full Control	
Jagged Alliance: Flashback	macOS	21 October 2014	Full Control	
Jagged Alliance: Flashback	Microsoft Windows	21 October 2014	Full Control	
Syberia	PlayStation 3	3 December 2014	Microïds	
Last Inua	macOS	11 December 2014	Glowforth Games	
Last Inua	Microsoft Windows	11 December 2014	Glowforth Games	
FreakOut: Extreme Freeride	Microsoft Windows	13 January 2015	Coldwood Interactive	
Ori and the Blind Forest	Microsoft Windows	11 March 2015	Moon Studios	
The Moment of Silence	Microsoft Windows	27 March 2015	House of Tales	
15 Days	Microsoft Windows	1 April 2015	House of Tales	
Syberia II	PlayStation 3	1 April 2015	MC2-Microïds	
Overclocked: A History of Violence	Microsoft Windows	3 April 2015	House of Tales	
The Mystery of the Druids	Microsoft Windows	7 April 2015	House of Tales	
Alter Echo	PlayStation 2 Classics on PlayStation 3	15 April 2015	Outrage Games	
Summoner	PlayStation 2 Classics on PlayStation 3	15 April 2015	Volition	
MX vs ATV: Unleashed	Microsoft Windows	17 April 2015	Rainbow Studios	
Broken Age	Linux	28 April 2015	Double Fine Productions	
Broken Age	macOS	28 April 2015	Double Fine Productions	
Broken Age	Microsoft Windows	28 April 2015	Double Fine Productions	
Black Mirror III: Final Fear	Microsoft Windows	8 May 2015	Cranberry Productions	
Pax Imperia: Eminent Domain	Microsoft Windows	7 July 2015	Heliotrope Studios	
The Vanishing of Ethan Carter	PlayStation 4	15 July 2015	The Astronauts	
Jagged Alliance: Online Reloaded	Microsoft Windows	24 September 2015	Cliffhanger Productions	
Impossible Creatures	Microsoft Windows	11 November 2015	Relic Entertainment	
Impossible Creatures: Insect Invasion	Microsoft Windows	11 November 2015	Relic Entertainment	
Men of Valor	Microsoft Windows	9 February 2016	2015	
Codename: Panzers – Phase One	Microsoft Windows	18 February 2016	Stormregion	
Codename: Panzers – Phase Two	Microsoft Windows	18 February 2016	Stormregion	
Quantum Break	Microsoft Windows	6 April 2016	Remedy Entertainment	
Warhammer: End Times – Vermintide	Microsoft Windows	4 October 2016	Fatshark	
Destroy All Humans!	PlayStation 2 Classics on PlayStation 4	18 October 2016	Pandemic Studios Australia	
Super Dungeon Bros	Linux	1 November 2016	React! Games	
Super Dungeon Bros	macOS	1 November 2016	React! Games	
Super Dungeon Bros	Microsoft Windows	1 November 2016	React! Games	
Super Dungeon Bros	PlayStation 4	1 November 2016	React! Games	
Super Dungeon Bros	Xbox One	1 November 2016	React! Games	
Destroy All Humans! 2	PlayStation 2 Classics on PlayStation 4	29 November 2016	Pandemic Studios Australia	
Red Faction	PlayStation 2 Classics on PlayStation 4	30 November 2016	Volition	
The Dwarves	Linux	1 December 2016	King Art Games	
The Dwarves	macOS	1 December 2016	King Art Games	
The Dwarves	Microsoft Windows	1 December 2016	King Art Games	
The Dwarves	PlayStation 4	1 December 2016	King Art Games	
The Dwarves	Xbox One	1 December 2016	King Art Games	
Imperium Galactica	Microsoft Windows	16 December 2016	Digital Reality Software	
Imperium Galactica II: Alliances	Microsoft Windows	16 December 2016	Digital Reality Software	
Tachyon: The Fringe	Microsoft Windows	12 January 2017	NovaLogic	
Halo Wars 2	Microsoft Windows	21 February 2017	343 Industries / Creative Assembly	
Silver	Linux	4 June 2017	Spiral House	
Silver	macOS	4 June 2017	Spiral House	
Silver	Microsoft Windows	4 June 2017	Spiral House	
The Town of Light	PlayStation 4	6 June 2017	LKA	
The Town of Light	Xbox One	6 June 2017	LKA	
Victor Vran: Overkill Edition	PlayStation 4	6 June 2017	Haemimont Games	
Victor Vran: Overkill Edition	Xbox One	6 June 2017	Haemimont Games	
Red Faction II	PlayStation 2 Classics on PlayStation 4	29 August 2017	Volition	
The Hunter: Call of the Wild	Microsoft Windows	2 October 2017	Expansive Worlds	
The Hunter: Call of the Wild	PlayStation 4	2 October 2017	Expansive Worlds	
The Hunter: Call of the Wild	Xbox One	2 October 2017	Expansive Worlds	
Red Faction II	Xbox One Backwards Compatibility Program	24 October 2017	Volition	
Helldorado	Microsoft Windows	16 November 2017	Spellbound Entertainment	
Pillars of Eternity II: Deadfire	Linux	8 May 2018	Obsidian Entertainment	
Pillars of Eternity II: Deadfire	macOS	8 May 2018	Obsidian Entertainment	
Pillars of Eternity II: Deadfire	Microsoft Windows	8 May 2018	Obsidian Entertainment	
Desperados: Wanted Dead or Alive	Linux	5 July 2018	Spellbound Entertainment	
Disneyland Adventures	Microsoft Windows	14 September 2018	Frontier Developments, Asobo Studio	
ReCore: Definitive Edition	Microsoft Windows	14 September 2018	Armature Studio, Comcept	
Rush: A Disney–Pixar Adventure	Microsoft Windows	14 September 2018	Asobo Studio	
Super Lucky's Tale	Microsoft Windows	14 September 2018	Playful Corporation	
Zoo Tycoon: Ultimate Animal Collection	Microsoft Windows	14 September 2018	Frontier Developments, Asobo Studio	
Broken Sword 5: The Serpent's Curse	Nintendo Switch	21 September 2018	Revolution Software	
The Hunter: Call of the Wild – 2019 Edition	Microsoft Windows	16 October 2018	Expansive Worlds	
The Hunter: Call of the Wild – 2019 Edition	PlayStation 4	16 October 2018	Expansive Worlds	
The Hunter: Call of the Wild – 2019 Edition	Xbox One	16 October 2018	Expansive Worlds	
8 to Glory	PlayStation 4	30 October 2018	Three Gates	
8 to Glory	Xbox One	30 October 2018	Three Gates	
Sunset Overdrive	Microsoft Windows	16 November 2018	Insomniac Games	
Generation Zero	Microsoft Windows	26 March 2019	Avalanche Studios	
Generation Zero	PlayStation 4	26 March 2019	Avalanche Studios	
Generation Zero	Xbox One	26 March 2019	Avalanche Studios	
Pillars of Eternity II: Deadfire	PlayStation 4	28 January 2020	Obsidian Entertainment	
Pillars of Eternity II: Deadfire	Xbox One	28 January 2020	Obsidian Entertainment	
Pillars of Eternity II: Deadfire	Nintendo Switch	Cancelled	Obsidian Entertainment	
Remnant: From the Ashes	Microsoft Windows	17 March 2020	Gunfire Games	
Remnant: From the Ashes	PlayStation 4	17 March 2020	Gunfire Games	
Remnant: From the Ashes	Xbox One	17 March 2020	Gunfire Games	
Remnant II	Microsoft Windows	25 July 2023	Gunfire Games	
Remnant II	PlayStation 5	25 July 2023	Gunfire Games	
Remnant II	Xbox Series X/S	25 July 2023	Gunfire Games	

== See also ==
- List of Deep Silver games
