= SuperPower =

2002 video game

- Developer: GolemLabs
- Publishers: NA: DreamCatcher Interactive; EU: GMX Media
- Designers: Jean-René Couture; Sébastien Kerjean; Luc Lussier; Germain Sauvé
- Platform: Microsoft Windows
- Release: NA: March 27, 2002; EU: January 10, 2003
- Genre: Turn-based strategy
- Mode: Single-player

SuperPower is a 2002 political simulation computer game. The game was designed by GolemLabs and published by DreamCatcher Interactive, debuting on March 28, 2002, for Microsoft Windows. SuperPower 2 was released in 2004. SuperPower 3 was released in 2022.

== Gameplay ==
The start of play is set during the first week of January 1997, with the player assuming the role of the newly appointed leader of one of 140 controllable nations. Players are given complete command over their nation from the use of thermonuclear weapons, to the level of taxes, to what kind of government is in control, to sending secret service operatives to conduct covert missions. SuperPower has two different game modes; scenarios and freeplay.

=== Scenarios ===
Superpower has some premade scenarios that offer a challenge in the way you have to solve a problem. The main factor that makes the scenarios difficult is that they restrict what kind of actions you can take (Ex: not being able to use military action)

Scenarios

- Argentina - Protect Bolivia from invasion
- Côte d'Ivoire - Reclaim control over territory
- United States - Restore democracy in Haiti
- South Korea - Sign an alliance with North Korea
- United Kingdom - Create anarchy in Poland
- Russia - Rebuilding the communist superpower
- China - Sign a strategic alliance with Taiwan

=== Freeplay ===
Freeplay is a sandbox mode, beginning with the choices of which nation to control, which objectives to complete and a time limit to complete them within. Play continues until the objectives are completed or the time limit expires. Freeplay can be played for one in-game year, five years, ten years, or for an unlimited amount of time. The mandatory objective is to stay in power, optional objectives include conquering the world, eliminating armed rebels, or balancing the nation's resources. The game can be set to play with the one mandatory objective, staying in power, and the unlimited time period for an objective free game.

== Reception ==
Reception

Aggregate score
Aggregator	Score
Metacritic	39/100

Review scores
Publication	Score
AllGame	3.5/5
Computer Gaming World	1/5
GameSpot	4.2/10
PC Gamer (US)	42%

The game received "unfavorable" reviews according to the review aggregation website Metacritic. It has been heavily criticized for its many bugs, including some that do not allow the player to complete the game in the amount of time listed, the game often crashing back to the desktop even when all the computer requirements have been met, and the country's budget suddenly crashing.

== See also ==
- SuperPower 2
