= Rebel Cops =

- Developer: Weappy Studio
- Publisher: THQ Nordic (Note: HandyGames published the iOS and Android versions.)
- Engine: Unity Engine
- Platforms: Nintendo Switch; PlayStation 4; Windows; Xbox One; Android; iOS
- Release: PS4, Switch, Win, XONE; WW: September 17, 2019; Android, iOS; WW: April 23, 2020
- Genre: Turn-based tactics
- Mode: Single-player

Rebel Cops is a 2019 turn-based tactics video game developed by Weappy Studio and published by THQ Nordic. It is a spinoff of This Is the Police and This Is the Police 2. Players control ex-police officers fighting against mobsters and a corrupt police department.

== Gameplay ==
Players control a group of ex-police officers who quit when their rural town, including the police force, was overtaken by a Russian mobster. As they work to free their town, players engage in turn-based tactical combat against the mobsters and corrupt police. Players can attempt to arrest criminals, which has a percentage chance of success based on factors such as how intimidating the officer is. Enemies who surrender this way are taken off the map and provide more experience points. Arresting enemies as opposed to killing them also earns "rebel points" used to activate special abilities. Upon gaining a level, players can customize the police officers with special abilities, such as the ability to fight back while injured or to arrest enemies from a distance. Characters can automatically warn each other when they are about to be spotted by suspects.

Characters do not have hit points; instead, anyone who is wounded dies in several rounds from blood loss unless they are stabilized. The exception is head shots, which are instantly fatal without a helmet. Leg wounds incapacitate a character, and being shot in the arm prevents them from retaliating. Chest wounds cause characters to bleed out twice as fast. Players have a limited number of saves. It is played from an isometric point of view.

== Development ==
THQ Nordic released Rebel Cops for Windows, PlayStation 4, Xbox One, and Nintendo Switch on September 17, 2019. HandyGames released it for iOS and Android on April 23, 2020.

== Reception ==
Rebel Cops received mixed reviews on Metacritic. Rock Paper Shotgun said they did not have enough information to make decisions, which they felt made completing a level repetitive and frustrating. Polygon was disappointed that the gameplay was different from its trailers, which they felt made it look like Longmire. They said it was not a bad game but has poor pacing and a lack of depth. Nintendo Life praised its replayability, challenging but easy-to-understand gameplay, and mission design, but they disliked the story and the Switch version's user interface. Push Square enjoyed the challenge posed by a lack of hit points and scarce resources, but they felt the more open missions lost this tense gameplay and became unfocused.
