= GolemLabs =

Canadian video game developer

- Type: Private
- Industry: Video games
- Founded: 2000; 26 years ago
- Headquarters: Sherbrooke, Canada
- Key people: Jean-René Couture (president)
- Website: golemlabs.com

GolemLabs is a Canadian video game developer based in Sherbrooke. The company was founded in 2000.

== Games developed ==
Year	Title	Platform(s)	Publisher(s)
2002	SuperPower	Microsoft Windows	DreamCatcher Interactive
2004	SuperPower 2	Microsoft Windows	DreamCatcher Interactive
2010	The Inlaws	Microsoft Windows	Strategy First
2011	Step Up	Wii	ZooZen
2022	The Guild 3	Microsoft Windows	THQ Nordic
2022	Superpower 3	Microsoft Windows	THQ Nordic
