= The Dwarves (novel) =

2003 fantasy novel by Markus Heitz

- First edition (German)
- Author: Markus Heitz
- Original title: Die Zwerge
- Translator: Sally-Ann Spencer
- Language: German
- Series: The Dwarves
- Genre: High fantasy
- Published: 2003
- Pages: 736
- ISBN: 1841495727
- Followed by: The War of the Dwarves

The Dwarves (German: Die Zwerge) is the first novel in the eponymous high fantasy series The Dwarves by German fantasy author Markus Heitz, published in 2003. The story follows an orphan dwarf by the name of Tungdil Bolofar (later Goldhand), who is raised by humans. The book was originally written in English and German. The book was continued in the following years with the titles The War of the Dwarves (October 2004) and The Revenge of the Dwarves (October 2005). The fourth volume The Fate of the Dwarves was released in February 2008. Seven years later, the fifth volume The Triumph of the Dwarves was released in February 2015. In September and November 2021, the series continued with the double volume The Return of the Dwarves book 1 and 2. The novel series The Legends of the Alfar, which deal with the bloodthirsty opponents of the dwarves, also takes place in the same world. A video game named The Dwarves, developed by King Art Games, is based on the first book; it was successfully funded through Kickstarter.

== Plot ==
Tungdil Goldhand, a young blacksmith, is the only dwarf in Ionandar, one of Girdlegard's five enchanted realms. These realms, rich in magical energy forcefields, are ruled by magi, while other lands are ruled by the kings and queens of Girdlegard. Tungdil's "foster father", the venerable magus Lot-Ionan, sends him on an errand to return some artifacts to one of his former pupils and travel to the secondling dwarf kingdom. Along the way he meets Boïndil Doubleblade and Boëndal Hookhand, two secondling twins, who lead him to Ogreʼs Death, a fortress in their kingdom. They slaughter orcs and avoid Nudin the Knowledge-Lusty (Nôdʼonn the Doublefold), a magus who has fallen under the spell of The Perished Land (the evil spirit of Girdlegard). Nudin betrays the magi, kills them, and corrupts the forcefields so that he alone can use them. The Perished Land attempted and succeeded in infiltrating Girdlegard and defeating the dwarves' fifthling kingdom eleven hundred cycles ago. Whoever dies on the Perished Land is raised as a revenant in service of the Perished Land's spirit; however, if the revenant's spirit is strong enough, it can resist the Perished Land's influence. Tungdil owns the books that explain the only way to defeat Nudin: forge a magical axe called Keenfire that needs to have a steel blade, a hilt made of the extinct tree known as the sidguredaisy, and runes engraved with a combination of all the known metals. They decapitate Nudin, but he survives thanks to the dark power of the spirit of the Perished Land possessing him. They meet Andôkai, the last surviving maga, and her bodyguard, Djerůn. Tungdil is also involved in a plot to delegitimize Gandogar's claim to the throne. Gandogar has been convinced by his evil advisor, Bislipur Surestroke, who is secretly a thirdling (an evil race of dwarves who throughout history have tried to end the lives of all other dwarves) that the elves betrayed the fifthlings and want to create a war with them while they're weak from the constant battles with the Perished Land. Tundgil and Gandogar then set out to forge Keenfire for the fifth challenge that was taken out by chance by Bislipur in the draw.

The fifthlings

The dwarves of the fifthling kingdom were divided into nine clans. They guarded the gate way to Girdlegard from the Perished Land. For a long time, the orcs fought against the dwarves unsuccessfully, but alfar came and caused a great sickness that sapped the dwarves strength, clouded their vision, and enfeebled their hands.

Soon Glamdolin Strongarm, a thirdling spy who was thought to be sick, opened the door. Glandallin, a brown haired and brown eyed dwarf, cut him down and charged the door with the few dwarves left alive to give the door time to close. Giselbert Ironeye, Glandallin, and eight other dwarves who were revenants (but able to resist the influence of the Perished Land) helped forge Keenfire. They held the orcs off with the help of the undead Bavragor Hammerfist. The symbol of the fifthlings is a circle of red vraccasiam chain links. It is said in one of the fifthling tablets "it is possible to rekindle a frozen dwarves innerfurnace with white hot coals."
