= The Dwarves (video game) =

2016 video game

- Developer: King Art Games
- Publisher: THQ Nordic
- Composer: Benny Oschmann
- Engine: Unity
- Platforms: Linux, Mac OS, Microsoft Windows, PlayStation 4, Xbox One
- Release: 1 December 2016
- Genre: Tactical role-playing
- Mode: Single-player

The Dwarves (German: Die Zwerge) is a 2016 fantasy tactical role-playing video game developed by King Art Games. It features music composed by Benny Oschmann. In the game, players must find their way through various maze-like, medieval environments while battling a variety of monsters using a wide array of weapons. It is based on the novel The Dwarves by Markus Heitz.

== Development ==
There was a campaign on Kickstarter that raised $310,091 for the development of the game through 2015 and 2016.

A beta version of the game was released on June 3, 2016.

== Reception ==
Reception to the game was mixed. It has a score of 68% of Metacritic. IGN awarded it a score of 6.2 out of 10, saying that the game has a "good foundation, but unfortunately it's not strong enough to make up for the deficiencies of its gameplay."

Reception

Aggregate score
Aggregator	Score
Metacritic	PC: 61/100; PS4: 60/100; XONE: 58/100

Review scores
Publication	Score
IGN	6.2/10
PC Gamer (US)	45/100
