= Markus Heitz =

German writer (born 1971)

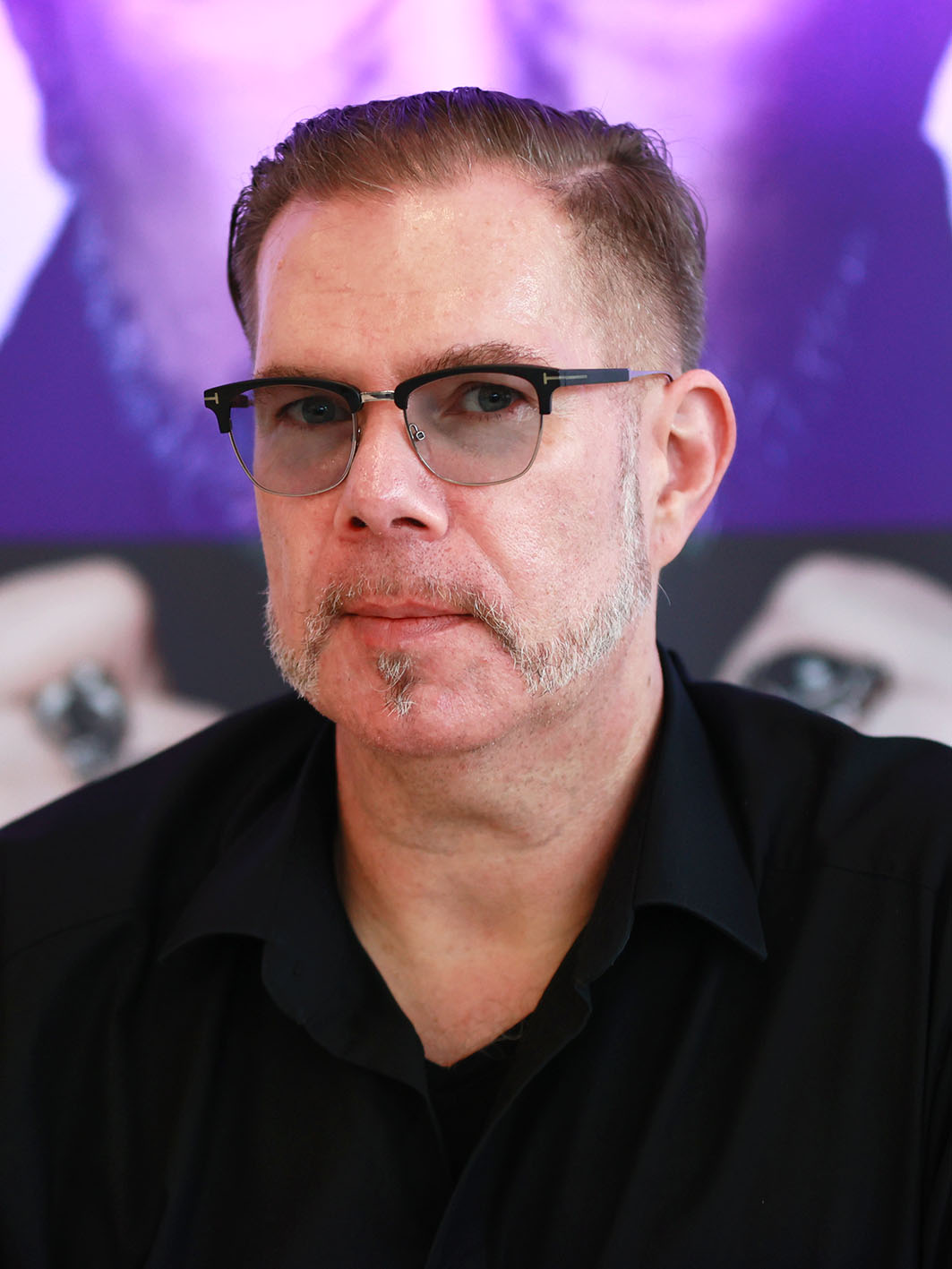
- Markus Heitz at Frankfurt Bookfair 2022
- Born: 10 October 1971 (age 54); Homburg, West Germany (now Germany)
- Education: University
- Occupation: novelist
- Writing career
- Period: 2002 – present
- Genres: Fantasy, Horror, Science fiction
- Notable work: The Dwarves
- Website: www.mahet.de

Markus Heitz (born 10 October 1971) is a German fantasy, horror and science fiction author best known for his Dwarves series of novels.

== Biography ==
Markus Heitz was born in Homburg, Germany, in 1971. He studied history, literature, and the German language. He now lives in Zweibrücken, Germany.

== Bibliography ==
=== Translated into English ===
==== The Dwarves (Die Zwerge) ====
English release date	English Title	German release date	Original Title
Jul 2009	The Dwarves	Nov 2003	Die Zwerge
Feb 2010	The War of the Dwarves	Oct 2004	Der Krieg der Zwerge
Oct 2011	The Revenge of the Dwarves	Oct 2005	Die Rache der Zwerge
Jul 2012	The Fate of the Dwarves	Feb 2008	Das Schicksal der Zwerge
Feb 2018	The Triumph of the Dwarves	Feb 2015	Der Triumph der Zwerge
May 2024	The Return of the Dwarves, Part 1	Sep 2021	Die Rückkehr der Zwerge, Teil 1
Oct 2024	The Return of the Dwarves, Part 2	Nov 2021	Die Rückkehr der Zwerge, Teil 2
TBA	The Heart of the Dwarves, Part 1	Sep 2022	Das Herz der Zwerge, Teil 1
TBA	The Heart of the Dwarves, Part 2	Nov 2022	Das Herz der Zwerge, Teil 2

==== The Legends of the Älfar (Die Legenden der Albae) ====
English release date	English Title	German release date	Original Title
Apr 2014	Righteous Fury	2009	Gerechter Zorn
Jun 2015	Devastating Hate	Aug 2011	Vernichtender Hass
Aug 2016	Dark Paths	Aug 2012	Dunkle Pfade
Aug 2019	Raging Storm	Oct 2013	Tobender Sturm
TBA	TBA	Mar 2014	Die Vergessenen Schriften

==== Doors ====
English release date	English Title	German release date	Original Title
March 2021	Doors ?: Colony	Oct 2018	? – Kolonie
March 2021	Doors X: Twilight	Oct 2018	X – Dämmerung
March 2021	Doors !: Field of Blood	Oct 2018	! – Blutfeld
TBA	TBA	Aug 2019	Wächter
TBA	TBA	Aug 2019	Energija
TBA	TBA	Aug 2019	Vorsehung

==== Other works ====
English release date	English Title	German release date	Original Title
Dec 2015	Oneiros	May 2012	Oneiros – Tödlicher Fluch

=== Unavailable in English ===
==== Ulldart: Die Dunkle Zeit ====
Year	Original Title
2002	Die Dunkle Zeit 1 – Schatten über Ulldart
2002	Die Dunkle Zeit 2 – Der Orden der Schwerter
2002	Die Dunkle Zeit 3 – Das Zeichen des dunklen Gottes
2003	Die Dunkle Zeit 4 – Unter den Augen Tzulans
2005	Die Dunkle Zeit 5 – Die Magie des Herrschers
2005	Die Dunkle Zeit 6 – Die Quellen des Bösen

==== Ulldart: Die Zeit des Neuen ====
Year	Original Title
2005	Zeit des Neuen 1 – Trügerischer Friede
2006	Zeit des Neuen 2 – Brennende Kontinente
2007	Zeit des Neuen 3 – Fatales Vermächtnis

==== Die Mächte des Feuers ====
Year	Original Title
2006	Die Mächte des Feuers
2010	Drachenkaiser
2016	Drachengift

==== Dunkle Spannung: Die Bestie ====
Year	Original Title
2006	Ritus
2006	Sanctum

==== Dunkle Spannung: Kinder des Judas ====
Year	Original Title
2007	Kinder des Judas
2010	Judassohn
2010	Judastöchter

==== Dunkle Spannung: Blutportale ====
Year	Original Title
2008	Blutportale

==== Spannung: Totenblick ====
Year	Original Title
2013	Totenblick

==== Spannung: Exkarnation ====
Year	Original Title
2014	Exkarnation – Krieg der alten Seelen

==== Justifiers ====
Year	Original Title
2010	Collector
2013	Collector – Operation Vade Retro

==== Shadowrun ====
Year	Original Title
2002	TAKC 3000
2002	Gottes Engel
2003	Aeternitas
2004	Sturmvogel
2004	05:58
2005	Jede Wette
2006	Schattenjäger
2007	Schattenläufer
