= The Book of Unwritten Tales 2 =

2015 video game

- Developer: King Art Games
- Publisher: Nordic Games (Note: Published as THQ Nordic on the Nintendo Switch)
- Director: Jan Theysen
- Composer: Benny Oschmann
- Engine: Unity 3D
- Platforms: Linux, Microsoft Windows, OS X, PlayStation 3, PlayStation 4, Xbox 360, Xbox One, Wii U, Nintendo Switch
- Release: Windows, OS X, Linux; 20 February 2015; PlayStation 3, PlayStation 4, Xbox 360, Xbox One; 18 September 2015; Wii U; 7 June 2016; Nintendo Switch; 5 February 2019
- Genre: Point-and-click adventure
- Mode: Single-player

The Book of Unwritten Tales 2 is a comedy point-and-click adventure video game created by the German developer King Art Games. The game, a sequel to The Book of Unwritten Tales, was published by Nordic Games on 20 February 2015 for Linux, Microsoft Windows and OS X. Console ports for the PlayStation 3, PlayStation 4, Xbox 360 and Xbox One were released in September 2015. The PlayStation 3 and Xbox 360 versions were released exclusively as digital downloads. The Wii U version was released on 7 June 2016 in Europe and North America. A Nintendo Switch version was announced, and released on 5 February 2019.

== Plot ==
The game's four protagonists, Wilbur a novice gnome mage, Nate a narcissistic human, Ivo a pregnant elf princess and a furry alien creature known as "Critter", partake in an adventure in the fantasy land of Aventasia. A magic force is turning beasts into puppies and castles into dollhouses. The four heroes reunite to combat this unusual transformation of Aventasia.

== Production ==
The English translation and voice recording were provided by OMUK. The game was successfully crowdfunded on Kickstarter. Before its official release, the game was launched on Steam Early Access. The game's launch trailer poked fun at video game monetisation strategies, such as free-to-play and microtransactions.

The game made its way to PlayStation 4 and Xbox One in both physical and digital form, for a budget price of $20 on 18 September 2015. PlayStation 3 and Xbox 360 versions were also released, but these remained exclusively digital downloads; the PlayStation 3 version retained the reduced price of the eighth-generation consoles, while the Xbox 360 launched at a cost of $30.

== Reception ==
Reception

Aggregate score
| Aggregator | Score |
|---|---|
| Metacritic | (NS) 77/100 (PC) 80/100 (XONE) 79/100 (PS4) 63/100 |

Review scores
| Publication | Score |
|---|---|
| GameRevolution | 4/5 |
| Hardcore Gamer | 4.5/5 |

The Book of Unwritten Tales 2 received positive reviews from critics. The game has a Metacritic score of 80/100. Game Revolution commented: "Is The Book of Unwritten Tales 2 worth getting? Definitely! Although it doesn't add much innovation to the series, this game offers a more complex and fine-tuned adventure than its predecessor." Hardcore Gamer: "If you love point and click adventures, The Book of Unwritten Tales 2 is everything you could possibly want and more. With stunning (and clever) graphics, a fully orchestrated soundtrack and top-notch voice acting, its production values are second to none, and it has writing chops to match." PC World called the puzzle design excellent but the graphics and audio occasionally spotty. It stated: "The Book of Unwritten Tales 2 is a reminder that while Telltale may have usurped the adventure genre, great traditional point-and-clicks can still be made."
