= Battle Worlds: Kronos =

2013 video game

- Developer: King Art Games
- Publishers: Crimson Cow; THQ Nordic
- Platforms: Linux, macOS, Windows, iOS, PlayStation 4, Xbox One, Switch
- Release: November 4, 2013 (PC); November 10, 2014 (iOS); April 26, 2016 (PS4, Xbox One); June 11, 2019 (Switch)
- Genre: Turn-based strategy
- Modes: Single-player, multiplayer

Battle Worlds: Kronos is a turn-based strategy video game developed by King Art Games for the PC platforms in 2013. It is considered a spiritual successor to the Battle Isle series.

== Gameplay ==
Following 200 years of peace, two opposing political factions are competing for control of a vacant throne in a far-off region of the galaxy. The game is a turn-based computer wargame played on a hex grid. The player controls a small army of ground, sea, and air units and must complete various objectives. These include escorting important units, defending positions, and capturing enemy headquarters. Each unit has multiple actions per turn. Some units have a move and attack option, while others have wild cards for extra moves or attacks. The main part of the game is the campaign mode which consists of three storylines.

== Release ==
The game was funded through Kickstarter in April 2013. The PC version was released on November 4, 2013. Trains expansion was released in May 2014 for the PC version that added a third campaign to the game. The iOS version was released on November 10, 2014. The PlayStation 4 and Xbox One versions were released on April 26, 2016. The Nintendo Switch version was released on June 11, 2019.

== Reception ==
Reception

Aggregate score
Aggregator	Score
Metacritic	71/100 (PC); 62/100 (PS4); 65/100 (Xbox); 60/100 (Switch)

Review scores
Publication	Score
4Players	77/100 (PC)
GameStar	82/100 (PC)
IGN	8/10 (Xbox)
Nintendo Life	7/10 (Switch)
Nintendo World Report	7.5/10 (Switch)
PC Games (DE)	8/10 (PC)
TouchArcade	3.5/5 (iPad)
CGMagazine	7/10 (PS4)
Multiplayer.it	6.5/10 (PC)

According to Metacritic, a review aggregator, Battle Worlds: Kronos received "mixed or average" reviews from critics.

TouchArcade summarized: "With so much content, story, replayability and generally fun gameplay this game would benefit massively from just a little bit of love from the developer to tighten up a few weak spots." Nintendo Life said: "While ultimately less accessible than the likes of Wargroove (which taps into that Nintendo-centric DNA of Advance Wars far better), Battle Worlds: Kronos does a decent job of bringing a more complex and challenging take on turn-based hex strategy." Nintendo World Report concluded: "While the interface quirks take some getting used to and the campaign difficulty may turn some off, there's definitely enjoyment to be had here for fans of the turn-based strategy genre."
