= SpellForce 3: Soul Harvest =

2019 video game expansion pack

- Developer(s): Grimlore Games
- Publisher(s): THQ Nordic
- Platform(s): Microsoft Windows
- Release: 28 May 2019
- Genre(s): Real-time strategy, role-playing
- Mode(s): Single-player, multiplayer

SpellForce 3: Soul Harvest is a 2019 stand-alone expansion pack for SpellForce 3 developed by Grimlore Games and published by THQ Nordic. It was released for Microsoft Windows on 28 May 2019. While it uses the same game engine and assets as SpellForce 3, Soul Harvest does not require the player to have purchased or installed the main game to play it.

Soul Harvest adds two new races to the game, dwarves and dark elves, both with a complete set of buildings and units, that replace the elves and orcs featured in the main game. Additionally, the expansion features a completely new campaign centered around a new player character, who is joined by a mix of old and new supporting characters with different backstories and abilities. As in the main game, characters can equip various items such as armor, weapons and jewelry that influence the character's abilities and traits. When playing the campaign with another player, the secondary player can now create their own character.

The expansion was more favorably received than the main game, with many reviewers noting the improvements over the main game as well as the attention to detail and the enjoyable story.

Despite itself being an expansion, Soul Harvest received a free Oktoberfest-themed DLC in September 2019.

== Gameplay ==
Players can again customize gender and appearance of their character, General Aerev. Unlike in the main game, players are restricted to choosing from two out of nine skill trees, with demonology and druidism having been added in Soul Harvest. Additionally, each combination of skill trees has a synergy skill that combines elements of both trees. Players can also create mercenaries, individually configured characters that can be chosen in the single-player campaign to accompany Aerev instead of the companions provided by the game. The main campaign adds 15 to 20 hours of gameplay and can be played by up to three players together. While the host will play as Aerev, joining players can choose to join as one of the mercenaries they created.

The interface has been overhauled. While the main game displayed the available skills below the character portraits in the upper left corner, Soul Harvest has a skill bar that can be placed at the top or the bottom and to which players can add the skills at their choosing. The information about available resources now resides at the lower right corner. Soul Harvest retains the skill-wheel that allows players to choose the skill to use when clicking on an enemy but limits the displayed skills to those that have been added to the skill bar.

While players can still choose a race to control when entering a map with real-time strategy elements, two of the races from the main game have been replaced. Dwarves replaced elves as the main defensive race which heavily focuses on stone as a building resource. Dark elves replaced orcs as the main offensive faction with a focus on many small units to overwhelm the enemy. Each race has new requirements for resources, with dwarves needing moonsilver and dark elves requiring echo, a resource harvested from the souls of dead units. Additionally, dwarves can build tunnels to connect different sectors, allowing easy transfer of units from one part of the map to another. Each faction also has its own titan, a large unique unit with superior attributes. Soul Harvest also adds flying units to all races, including elves and orcs from the main game. Soul Harvest retains the mechanic of having to conquer sectors to expand the player's territory but resources are now automatically shared between neighboring sectors and no longer have to be transported by carriages. This also forces players to have a continuous territory to share resources. The factions from the main game are still playable in multiplayer and skirmish games. The multiplayer system was expanded with a ranked system.

Soul Harvest includes an improved map editor that allows players to create their own maps for multiplayer or skirmish matches based on the changes introduced in the expansion.

== Synopsis ==
=== Setting and characters ===
Soul Harvest takes place in the kingdom of Northander on the fictional world of Eo, approximately two years after the events of the main game. Tahar, the main game's players character, has been killed during this time, so players take control over General Aerev, a Northandian soldier who was in the kingdom of Empyria during the events of the main game. They are joined by a number of companions, including elven warrior Yria from the main game, Raith Skaddar, a dark elf who featured in the main game as a quest giver and dwarven warrior Rerah.

=== Plot ===
Aerev is living in disgrace after being responsible for the death of their company when the Queen recalls them to the capital of Greykeep. She grants them a second chance, makes them commander of the Wolf Guard and orders them to investigate several incidents that seem to indicate that the God of Light is again trying to enter the world. Aerev discovers that a masked woman working for a dark elven group called the Crescent has been stealing the souls of humans, dwarves and dark elves alike.

Aerev goes on to help with a rebellion against a racist dwarven demagogue, Arakys, who preaches violence against all other races. They learn that the God of Light needs four Corrupted, souls that wittingly or unwittingly serve it, to bring forth "Jaku", the end of the world. With Rondar Lacairne dead at the hands of Tahar, this leaves Aerev with the task of finding and eliminating the other three. The group tries to identify the other Corrupted but the masked woman interrupts the ritual and the Crescent attacks Greykeep. Aerev chases the attackers to nearby King's Crossing and deals with them but the masked woman escapes. They then lay siege to Windholme and take out Arakys, only to discover that Isgrimm, the Circle Mage that served with Tahar, was controlling Arakys. Afterwards they travel to meet with a former subordinate from Empyria who blames Aerev for his family's death.

Having dealt with both Corrupted, they discover that the Crescent is searching for the Temple of Light which contains a portal to allow the God of Light to enter the world. Aerev manages to defeat the Crescent and the masked woman, only to be betrayed by their companion Raith who struck a deal with the God of Light in exchange for being sent to a reality in which his family did not die. Aerev and his companions enter the God of Light's domain and after a series of challenges, the God of Light offers Aerev the choice of living in a new reality in which they never failed or to face the consequences of their mistake. If the former is chosen, the game ends immediately. The latter choice sees Aerev wake up in Greykeep and learning that the whole regiment followed them and Jaku was averted.

== Development ==
Soul Harvest was first announced via a trailer that the developer added to SpellForce 3 in December 2018. The expansion was released on 28 May 2019. While the expansion does not require SpellForce 3 to run, publisher THQ Nordic granted all owners of the main game a 40% rebate on the expansion on Steam.

=== Downloadable content (DLC) ===
Since Grimlore Games is based in Munich, which is famously home of the world-largest Volksfest, the Oktoberfest, the developer published a free Oktoberfest-themed DLC on 26 September 2019. It features a new Bavarian-themed skirmish map called "Fight for the Theresienwiese" with a new map-exclusive hero that has their own skill trees (voiced by Michael Altinger) as well as a new Bavarian-sounding voice-over and Oktoberfest music.

== Reception ==
Reception

Aggregate score
Aggregator	Score
Metacritic	80/100

Review scores
Publication	Score
GameStar	84
PC Games (DE)	8/10

Soul Harvest received "generally favorable reviews" from critics according to review aggregator Metacritic.

The graphics of Soul Harvest were generally lauded by reviewers who noted the attention to details. Le Soir however criticized that the graphics did not allow players to easily identify their own units, making large fights hard to manage.

Reviewers liked the audio of the game, with both the voice acting and the soundtrack being lauded, although some dialogues have been described as long-winded and boring. Critics also found the story interesting and compelling, despite the noted common premise of a hero that fell from grace and is granted a second chance.

The ability to customize the character was generally received favorably, although some reviewers bemoaned the limited amount of cosmetic customization options. The mix of role-playing and real-time strategy elements was again highlighted as the source of the series' strength.

Multiple critics, such as PC Games and GameStar, prefaced their reviews with assurances that Soul Harvest did not suffer from the same amount of bugs that crippled the main game. The lack of bugs compared to the main game was noted positively by most critics. German game magazine GameStar called Soul Harvest "compensation" for the buggy main game, noting that it only has few problems compared with the release of SpellForce 3. Eurogamer.de called Soul Harvest "the better SpellForce 3".

PCMag Greece liked the fact that units have multiple abilities that allow even lower level units to be relevant into the late game. However, the faster pace required from players was noted negatively.
