= The Book of Unwritten Tales: The Critter Chronicles =

2012 video game

- Developer: King Art Games
- Publisher: Nordic Games
- Platforms: Windows, Mac OS X, Linux
- Release: December 5, 2012
- Genre: Adventure
- Mode: Single-player

The Book of Unwritten Tales: The Critter Chronicles (German: The Book of Unwritten Tales: Die Vieh Chroniken) is a point-and-click adventure video game created by German developer King Art Games. It is a prequel to The Book of Unwritten Tales that was released in 2009.

== Premise ==
Game visuals and interface

The Critter Chronicles follows adventurer Nate Bonnett and his companion Critter depicting their first meeting. The story is set before the events involving of Wilbur and Ivo in The Book of Unwritten Tales. It is a point-and-click adventure game set in the fantasy world of Aventazia taking place across many locations.
