= King Art Games =

German video game developer

KING Art GmbH
- Industry: Video games
- Founded: 2000
- Founder: Jan Theysen; Marc König
- Headquarters: Bremen, Germany
- Products: The Book of Unwritten Tales series
- Number of employees: 110 (2024)
- Website: kingart-games.com

King Art Games (stylized as KING Art Games) is a German video game developer. It was established by Jan Theysen and Marc König in 2000 to focus on graphic adventure games and role-playing video games.

The company created the point-and-click adventure The Book of Unwritten Tales, including its prequel called The Critter Chronicles and the sequel The Book of Unwritten Tales 2. Their other project that uses similar gameplay mechanics is the point-and-click adventure The Raven: Legacy of a Master Thief. They also developed the turn-based strategy game Battle Worlds: Kronos and the tactical role-playing game The Dwarves, which is based on the novel of the same name.

In January 2020, their game Iron Harvest won the "Best German Game" award at the Deutscher Entwicklerpreis, and the developer team also won "Best Game Design" and "Best Sound Design" and was nominated for "Best Graphic" and "Best Story".

== Games developed ==
=== Browser and mobile games ===
- Murphy’s Law
- Drivals
- My Free Zoo
- My Fantastic Park
- My Little Farmies
- Undermaster
- Inkheart (2009), Nintendo DS

=== 2011 to present ===
Year	Game	Publisher	Genre	Platform(s)												
Year	Game	Publisher	Genre	Win	OS X	Linux	PS3	PS4	PS5	Wii U	NSW	X360	XONE	XSXS	iOS	Android
2011	The Book of Unwritten Tales	Various	Adventure	Yes	Yes	Yes	No	No	No	No	No	No	No	No	No	No
2012	The Book of Unwritten Tales: The Critter Chronicles	Nordic Games	Adventure	Yes	Yes	Yes	No	No	No	No	No	No	No	No	No	No
2013	The Raven: Legacy of a Master Thief	Nordic Games	Adventure	Yes	Yes	Yes	Yes	Yes	No	No	Yes	Yes	Yes	No	No	No
2013	Battle Worlds: Kronos	Nordic Games	Turn-based strategy	Yes	Yes	Yes	No	Yes	No	No	Yes	No	Yes	No	Yes	Yes
2015	The Book of Unwritten Tales 2	Nordic Games	Adventure	Yes	Yes	Yes	Yes	Yes	No	Yes	Yes	Yes	Yes	No	Yes	Yes
2016	The Dwarves	THQ Nordic	Tactical RPG	Yes	Yes	Yes	No	Yes	No	No	No	No	Yes	No	No	No
2017	Black Mirror	THQ Nordic	Adventure	Yes	Yes	Yes	No	Yes	No	No	No	No	Yes	No	No	No
2020	Iron Harvest	Deep Silver	Real-time strategy	Yes	No	No	No	No	Yes	No	No	No	No	Yes	No	No
2026	Warhammer 40,000: Dawn of War IV	Deep Silver	Real-time strategy	Yes	No	No	No	No	No	No	No	No	No	No	No	No

== See also ==
- Daedalic Entertainment – German adventure game developer
- House of Tales – German adventure game developer
