= The Book of Unwritten Tales =

2009 video game

- Cover art
- Developer: King Art Games
- Publishers: Microsoft Windows: NA: The Adventure Company; EU: HMH Interactive; WW: Nordic Games (digital); OS X, Linux: WW: Nordic Games
- Platforms: Windows, Mac OS X, Linux
- Release: Microsoft Windows: EU: April 2, 2009; NA: October 28, 2011; UK: October 28, 2011; AU: April 12, 2012; WW: July 31, 2012 (Steam); OS X March 29, 2012; Linux; November 6, 2012
- Genre: Adventure
- Mode: Single-player

The Book of Unwritten Tales is a point-and-click adventure video game created by German developer King Art Games. A prequel called The Book of Unwritten Tales: The Critter Chronicles was released in 2012. A sequel, The Book of Unwritten Tales 2, was released on February 20, 2015.

== Gameplay ==
Gameplay sample

The game challenges the player with a series of puzzles and brain teasers presented as a traditional point and click adventure game. The puzzles are embedded in an adventure story that takes most players an average of 20 hours to complete. There are 60 locations to explore with a total of 40 non-player characters and about 250 interactible items.

A notable feature of The Book of Unwritten Tales is that the player controls four different characters. In some scenes it is possible to switch between two or three active characters. Making explicit use of this mechanic, some puzzles require the playable characters to exchange items or otherwise cooperate.

== Reception ==
=== Domestic ===
Reception

Review scores
Publication	Score
PC Games	85%
GameStar	85/100
4Players	85/100

=== International ===
Reception

Aggregate score
Aggregator	Score
Metacritic	82/100

Review scores
Publication	Score
Adventure Gamers	4.5/5
Destructoid	8.5/10
GamePro	3.5/5
GamesMaster	81%
GameSpot	8/10
GameSpy	3.5/5
GameZone	9/10
IGN	9/10
PC PowerPlay	7/10
The Digital Fix	8/10
The Escapist	5/5

The Book of Unwritten Tales received "favorable" reviews according to the review aggregation website Metacritic.

The Escapist gave it all five stars and said, "If you're going to try and woo a modern gaming audience with old-fashioned gameplay, you'd better be pretty special. The Book of Unwritten Tales is. It's smart, funny, [and] well-crafted and has tons of heart." 411Mania gave it 8.1 out of 10 and said that the game "harkens back to the golden age of point-and-clicks and does a great job of it. Fans of the genre will love seeing a new entry into the genre that's enjoyable to play. Other PC gamers may want to check it out, as even the puzzles don't require a huge amount of thinking to solve." The Digital Fix gave it eight out of ten and called it "a thoroughly entertaining and engaging adventure game with a classic fantasy storyline, well thought-out plot lines, loveable characters, and plenty of humour that is must for anybody who likes point and click adventures".

In 2011, Adventure Gamers named The Book of Unwritten Tales the 64th-best adventure game ever released.
