= SuperPower 2 =

2004 video game

- Developer: GolemLabs
- Publisher: DreamCatcher Interactive
- Platform: Microsoft Windows
- Release: NA: October 12, 2004; PAL: November 19, 2004
- Genre: Government simulation game
- Modes: Single-player, multiplayer

SuperPower 2 is a real-time strategy wargame developed by Canadian based GolemLabs and published by DreamCatcher Interactive in 2004, following SuperPower. It was released between October 12 and November 19, 2004, in North America and Europe, respectively. On April 18, 2014, Nordic Games officially released SuperPower 2 on the Steam Store.

Players may join a game as any of the 193 nations recognized by the United Nations at the time of its development. All standard games start in the year 2001, with the player taking control of their nation. They then must work toward their predefined goals, such as achieving world peace, balancing their nation's resources, or conquering the world, or, if they did not set any predefined goals, they have the opportunity to work toward developing their nation's infrastructure, increasing their military strength through new unit designs and development, and encouraging the economic and cultural growth of their nation.

Any nation not controlled by a player is considered an AI nation. If there are predefined objectives, the player will attempt to reach this objective to win the game. The AI will have their own objectives, which they will try to reach as well. If and when the player and the AI have conflicting goals, it is up to the player, and occasionally the AI, to decide if diplomacy is the way to go, or if war is the answer to their problems.

Because SuperPower 2 is a real-time game, there is no preset end date. This means that a single game can, in theory, run indefinitely.

SuperPower 2 was released in English, French, German, Spanish, Korean, Chinese and Russian.

== Spheres ==
=== Political sphere ===
Political sphere

- Political sphere (menu structure)
  - Constitutional
  - Internal Laws
  - Treaties
    - New Treaty
    - View Selected

Political sphere consists of all political activity, domestic and international, of the selected nation. This sphere allows players to see (and modify if own nation is selected) internal laws, government type, and diplomatic agreements.

=== Military sphere ===
Military sphere

The Military sphere consists of all military and covert operations. This sphere allows players to buy, sell, build, train, deploy, disband a variety of military units. It also allows players to train intelligence cells and conduct covert warfare. In addition, strategic warfare is controlled from this sphere.

==== Strategic warfare ====
Strategic warfare consists of nuclear missiles being launched from land based locations, or from submarines. Nuclear warfare is devastating for both the attacker and the victim. When a nuclear missile is launched and detonates in another nation, relations with nations around the world decline, depending on the importance of the nation attacked. The attacker's nation also becomes less stable, increasing chances of a revolution.

The Russian Federation launching a nuclear strike against the United States

=== Economic sphere ===
The economic sphere consists of all financial activity. From this sphere player can view (and control if the selected nation is the same as the player's) income and expenses as well as trade and taxes. Players can set national interest rates, income tax levels, tariffs, and spending levels in this sphere. Players can also nationalize or privatize portions of their economy. This is also where the "Autarky" bug does most damage because in the game trade is almost always the most income generating source and when the bug sets in, this well of wealth inevitably dries up when no other nations buy your goods. However, playing a country with high levels of raw resources like South Africa with precious metals, seems to not fall victim to the bug as quickly as countries relying on services and agriculture. Also, by invading nearby countries followed by annexation and high levels of taxes can also stave off autarky. At this point however, convincing the rest of the world not to invade is a bigger problem.

== Reception ==
Reception

Aggregate score
Aggregator	Score
Metacritic	51/100

Review scores
Publication	Score
Computer Gaming World	1.5/5
GameSpot	5.2/10
GameSpy	1/5
GameZone	7.6/10
IGN	4.5/10
PC Format	51%
PC Gamer (UK)	41%
PC Gamer (US)	43%
PC Zone	58%

Although slightly improved over the original SuperPower, the sequel received "mixed" reviews according to the review aggregation website Metacritic.

Many critics referred to the game as highly ambitious but critically flawed. One of the most positive reviews, from GameZone, said that "The number of options, the good graphics for the globe and almost limitless gameplay adds up a game that is worthy of United Nations attention."

However, many high-profile gaming publications panned the game, with common criticisms including frequent crashes, a poorly designed user interface, features that were either not implemented or apparently ineffective, and frequent implausible, nonsensical, and unexplained events occurring during the game (such as Poland declaring war on Burkina Faso for unclear reasons). A reviewer for GameSpy described SuperPower 2 as "a bunch of pointless hand-waving in a half-hearted attempt to pawn off a ponderous spreadsheet as a game", also stating that "...because the game is so devoid of personality, it's not even engaging as a way of experimenting with nightmare scenarios. There's nothing satisfying about taking control of the U.S. and changing it to a military dictatorship without freedom of speech or women's suffrage, only to see your political standing inch to the right and maybe your approval rating dip for a while." IGN was also critical of the game, giving it a score of 4.5 out of 10 and stating, among other things, that "The art of international war itself is conducted here according to principles that would make Sun Tzu burn his book and restart life as a caterer." The game also features plenty of mods to choose from which change and edit the game play to specific real time or fictional settings.

== Steam release ==
After nearly 10 years from the original release date, the game was released on the PC game distribution platform Steam on April 18, 2014, after a successful Steam Greenlight campaign. The Steam version features updated code and patches for bugs that were long neglected in the older version. However, this version also came with its share of problems, such as fullscreen mode not being an option, and the updated code breaking user-made modifications from the older version. The former was fixed however. Steam achievements were also added, as well as a new authentication system and server browser, which replaced GameSpy, its former server browser service that discontinued the game earlier in the year.

== GOG release ==
Remastered DRM-free version of the game was released on the PC game distribution platform GOG.com on August 13, 2015, with a 4 day -50% launch discount. Game is sold with additional manual, design document, concept arts and team photographs. Much like Steam version it lacked full screen mode. Remastering included support for widescreen resolutions, new multiplayer matchmaking with modified multiplayer user interface, and an updated source code to offer support for modern operating systems. Initial reviews were mixed.

== Bugs ==
After playing for a long period (the exact amount varies from game to game), a bug called Autarky sets in. The Autarky bug will always happen if the game is going on for a long period. It makes it nearly impossible for a nation to trade because everyone has a surplus of many of the items they trade. This causes nations to begin to lose money, since they can no longer make money from trade. While in most cases the bug eventually occurs, the use of extensive measures within player controlled countries- such as explosive population growth manipulation, severe limiting of human development and minimal infrastructures and telecommunications development- can maintain a permanent, large, and increasing resource deficit, which results in permanent importing for the player country, and massive export growth for virtually all other countries. With extreme population manipulation through the building and canceling of large numbers of soldiers while paused, it is possible to sustain a pan-global computer nation export economy with one underdeveloped, vastly overpopulated nation.

There are several patches made by the modding community fixing bugs, but the Autarky bug has never been fully patched out.

== Sequel ==
GolemLabs announced a sequel to the game, SuperPower 3, on September 17, 2021, during the THQ Nordic 10th Anniversary Showcase. The preview showed no gameplay but was stated by GolemLabs to be a "direct message" to those who have waited for the game, with the President of the United States stating "Because we've all had to wait, and for much too long, to be finally heard." in the showcase.

The Steam page for SuperPower 3 went live the same day as the announcement, showing improved graphics and even a character customization kit available before every game. The game is reportedly much larger than the previous edition, requiring 55GB of hard disk space.

SuperPower 3 was released on October 7, 2022. Although following release, it was met with negative reviews.
