= The Raven: Legacy of a Master Thief =

2013 video game

- Developer: King Art Games
- Publisher: The Adventure Company (Note: Remastered version published by THQ Nordic.)
- Platforms: Microsoft Windows; OS X Linux; PlayStation 3 Xbox 360; PlayStation 4 Xbox One; Nintendo Switch
- Release: Windows, OS X, Linux; July 23, 2013; PlayStation 3, Xbox 360; January 14, 2014; Remastered; Windows, macOS, PlayStation 4, Xbox One; March 13, 2018; Nintendo Switch; January 22, 2019
- Genre: Point-and-click adventure
- Mode: Single-player

The Raven: Legacy of a Master Thief (German: The Raven: Vermächtnis eines Meisterdiebs) is an episodic point-and-click adventure video game developed by King Art Games.

== Gameplay ==
The gameplay incorporates elements of stealth and detective work. It includes some cross-genre gameplay standards such as lockpicking doors and gathering key items. It also includes a point system, which serves as a ranking system and can be used to unlock new areas of the map. One of its main gameplay elements is puzzle solving.

== Plot ==
The Raven is set in 1964. Some time ago, the master thief "The Raven" was in the public eye: he tricked the police many times and always left his trademark, a black raven feather, at the crime scene. Finally, in a chase, he was caught and shot by Inspector Nicolas Legrand and fell to his death. A few years later, a valuable ruby, one of the two eyes of the Sphinx, is stolen from the British Museum in London, with the perpetrator leaving a raven feather at the crime scene. Another ruby, the second eye of the Sphinx, is to be taken to Venice on the Orient Express under the guard of Legrand and from there by ship to Cairo for an exhibition. The police fear that the perpetrator could also be after the second diamond.

== Part 1: The Eye of the Sphinx ==
At the start of the game, the player takes on the role of Jakob Anton Zellner, a Swiss police officer. The Orient Express is on its journey from Paris via Venice to Istanbul. On board is Inspector Nicolas Legrand, who guards a safe that is on board. Zellner was assigned by the Swiss police to support Legrand, who is not enthusiastic about this offer. During the journey, the train is stopped in a tunnel by a deliberately caused explosion. Zellner fears that the Eye of the Sphinx WAS stolen, but it turns out that Legrand wanted to trap the raven on the train; the ruby was actually brought to Venice via a different route. There he is loaded onto a cruise ship bound for Cairo, and Zellner is able to smuggle himself on board despite Legrand's resistance. During the trip, a rich patron is murdered and Zellner secretly investigates on his own. He finds the ship's doctor, who is responsible for the patron's death and is now trying to kill Zellner in order to cover his tracks.

== Part 2: Cradle of Deception ==
Zellner survives the ship's doctor's attack. The cruise ship arrives in Cairo. The two eyes of the Sphinx were supposed to be on display in the museum there, but because of the theft that preceded the game, only one of the two rubies can be seen. The raven steals this eye before the exhibition opens, but Zellner is able to pursue him, catch the thief and uncover the raven's identity. The player then relives the events since the beginning of part one, but from the perspective of one of the raven's assistants Adil Jamal, who only appeared as a minor character in the first part.

== Part 3: Murderers and Ravens ==
In the third part, the plot already broadly known to the player continues on board the MS Lydia and later in the museum in Cairo from the perspective of the Adil; In addition, the player also controls Adil's girlfriend Patricia Mayers, who was also introduced as a supporting character in the first part. In the end, a number of surprise twists are revealed.

== Development ==
The game was released for Microsoft Windows via Steam as of July 23, 2013. The game was released on PlayStation 3 and Xbox 360 on January 14, 2014. On January 10, 2018, a trailer for The Raven Remastered was released by THQ Nordic. The game was re-released on March 13, 2018 for Microsoft Windows, macOS, PlayStation 4 and Xbox One, and was enhanced for Xbox One X. A Nintendo Switch version was released in January 22, 2019.

== Chapters ==
- "Chapter 1: The Eye of the Sphinx"
- "Chapter 2: Ancestry of Lies"
- "Chapter 3: A Murder of Ravens"

== Reception ==
Reception

Aggregate score
Aggregator	Score
Metacritic	74/100

Review scores
Publication	Score
Adventure Gamers	4/5
Game Informer	7/10
GameSpot	5/10
IGN	9/10
Push Square	4/10
RPGFan	85/100

The game received mixed or average reviews from critics on Metacritic with a score of 74. IGN made a favorable comparison between Legacy of a Master Thief and classic literary works such as And Then There Were None. Joystiq praised the game for its writing and voice acting, praising in particular the nuances in main character Zellner's voice, but criticized it for being formulaic with its clunky execution.

Game Informer's review was mixed, expressing excitement for the next installment in the series and finding the game's mystery intriguing enough to cover for "antiquated design", but claimed a cliffhanger ending required one to play all three episodes to feel fulfilled. GameSpot called the game boring and criticized it for glitchy movement.
