= This Is the Police 2 =

2018 video game

This Is The Police 2
- Developer: Weappy Studio
- Publishers: THQ Nordic (Note: HandyGames published the iOS version.); EuroVideo Medien
- Composers: Ben Matthews; Kevin Penkin
- Platforms: Microsoft Windows; OS X; Linux; PlayStation 4; Xbox One; Nintendo Switch; iOS
- Release: Microsoft Windows, OS X, Linux; August 2, 2018; PlayStation 4, Xbox One; September 25, 2018; Nintendo Switch; September 27, 2018; iOS; September 12, 2019
- Genres: Adventure, strategy
- Mode: Single-player

This Is the Police 2 is an adventure strategy video game by Belarusian developer Weappy Studio and published by THQ Nordic. It was released for Microsoft Windows, macOS, Linux, PlayStation 4, Xbox One, and Nintendo Switch in 2018. An iOS version was released in September 2019. It is a sequel to This Is the Police. The player controls the protagonist from the previous game, Jack Boyd, under new name Warren Nash, who is trying to hide from federal agents in the fictional city of Sharpwood in 1987.

== Gameplay ==
This Is the Police 2 features a range of mechanics that add depth and complexity to the gameplay, providing players with a challenging and immersive experience in managing law enforcement in the town of Sharpwood. The gameplay is presented via imagery and text on an isometric map.

The game combines management and tactical elements as players navigate through a complex web of crime, corruption, and moral dilemmas. As sheriff, players are tasked with making crucial decisions that impact the outcome of investigations, law enforcement operations, and the overall state of the town. The game features a nonlinear narrative, allowing players to shape the story through their choices and actions.

By managing the police force and allocating resources effectively, players must maintain law and order while dealing with a wide range of criminal activities, such as robberies, homicides, drug trafficking, and more. One of the key aspects of the gameplay is the strategic planning and execution of police operations. Players must assign officers with specific skills and equipment to handle each situation. Tactical decision-making plays a vital role during intense confrontations, where players must manage their limited resources and ensure the safety of their officers.

Additionally, This Is the Police 2 introduces a new mechanic called the "Sheriff's Department". Players are responsible for managing the sheriff's staff, dealing with their personal problems, and earning their loyalty. Developing relationships with the officers and gaining their trust is crucial for maintaining a capable and motivated police force.

This Is the Police 2 incorporates turn-based tactical combat when responding to crimes or engaging in encounters. Players have direct control over their officers during these situations, utilizing a grid-based system to maneuver and position their team strategically. Each officer has unique abilities and skills, and players must carefully consider their strengths and weaknesses to maximize their effectiveness in combat.

== Plot ==
In the town of Sharpwood, Sheriff Wells and two other Sharpwood Sheriff's Department deputies investigate a suspected base of the Neckties, a gang of drug traffickers. All three are killed in an ambush, resulting in Lilly Reed to be promoted as the new sheriff.

== Reception ==
This Is the Police 2 received "mixed or average reviews" according to the review aggregator website Metacritic, based on 34 critic reviews. The game was mainly liked, but criticized for new in-game mechanics. Tom Hatfield of PC Gamer stated that "the core is solid, but there's simply too much bloat". Lorenzo Fantoni of IGN described it as "Fargo mixed with X-COM". The reviewer said that the management of cops in the game is fun, but it can be occasionally difficult in some instances.
