= List of PC games (G) =

The following page is an alphabetical section from the list of PC games.

== G ==
Name	Developer	Publisher	Genre(s)	Operating system(s)	Date released
Game Dev Tycoon	Greenheart Games	Greenheart Games	Casual, indie, simulation, strategy	Windows, Linux, macOS	10 December 2012
Garry's Mod	Facepunch Studios	Valve	Nonlinear, sandbox physics	Windows, Linux, macOS	29 August 2013
Genshin Impact	miHoYo	miHoYo	Action role-playing	Windows	28 September 2020
Giant Cop: Justice Above All	Other Ocean Interactive	Other Ocean Interactive	Action	Windows	30 May 2017
Goat Simulator	Coffee Stain Studios	Coffee Stain Studios	Nonlinear, sandbox physics	Windows, Linux, macOS	1 April 2014
Gone Home	The Fullbright Company	The Fullbright Company	Adventure, interactive fiction, point and click	Windows, Linux, macOS	15 August 2013
Gothic	Piranha Bytes	Xicat Interactive	Action role-playing	Windows	15 April 2001
Gothic II	Piranha Bytes	JoWooD Entertainment	Action role-playing	Windows	29 November 2002
Gothic 3	Piranha Bytes	JoWooD Entertainment, Deep Silver, Aspyr Media	Action role-playing	Windows	13 October 2006
Gothic 3: Forsaken Gods	Trine Games, Mad Vulture Games	JoWooD Entertainment	Action role-playing	Windows	21 November 2008
Arcania: Gothic 4	Spellbound Entertainment	JoWooD Entertainment, DreamCatcher Interactive	Action role-playing	Windows	14 October 2010
Arcania: Fall of Setarrif	Spellbound Entertainment	Nordic Games	Action role-playing	Windows	25 October 2011
God of War	Santa Monica Studio	Sony Interactive Entertainment	Action-adventure, hack and slash	Windows	January 14, 2022
Grand Theft Auto	DMA Design	BMG Interactive	Open world, action-adventure	Windows, MS-DOS	21 October 1997
Grand Theft Auto: London 1961	Rockstar Canada	Rockstar Games	Open world, action-adventure	Windows	1 June 1999
Grand Theft Auto: London 1969	Rockstar Canada	Rockstar Games	Open world, action-adventure	Windows, MS-DOS	31 March 1999
Grand Theft Auto 2	DMA Design	Rockstar Games	Open world, action-adventure	Windows	22 October 1999
Grand Theft Auto III	DMA Design	Rockstar Games	Open world, action-adventure	Windows	21 May 2002
Grand Theft Auto IV	Rockstar North	Rockstar Games	Open world, action-adventure	Windows	2 December 2008
Grand Theft Auto IV: The Lost and Damned	Rockstar North	Rockstar Games	Open world, action-adventure	Windows	13 April 2010
Grand Theft Auto: The Ballad of Gay Tony	Rockstar North	Rockstar Games	Open world, action-adventure	Windows	13 April 2010
Grand Theft Auto: San Andreas	Rockstar North	Rockstar Games	Open world, action-adventure	Windows, macOS	7 June 2005
Grand Theft Auto: Vice City	Rockstar North	Rockstar Games	Open world, action-adventure	Windows, macOS	12 May 2003
Grand Theft Auto V	Rockstar North	Rockstar Games	Open world, action-adventure	Windows	14 April 2015
Grid 2	Codemasters	Codemasters	Racing, arcade	Windows	27 May 2013
Ground Control	Massive Entertainment	Sierra On-Line	Real-time tactics	Windows	1 June 2000
Ground Control II: Operation Exodus	Massive Entertainment	Vivendi Universal	Real-time tactics	Windows	18 June 2004
Growtopia	Ubisoft Abu Dhabi (2017–present), Robinson Technologies (2013-2017), Hamumu Software (2013-2017)	Ubisoft (2017–present), Robinson Technologies (2013-2017)	MMO	Windows, macOS	30 November 2012
GTR Evolution	Sinbin Studios	Atari, Viva Media	Racing	Windows	1 August 2008
Guacamelee!	DrinkBox Studios	DrinkBox Studios	Metroidvania, platformer, beat 'em up	Windows, Linux, macOS	8 August 2013
Guild Wars	ArenaNet	NCSoft	CORPG	Windows	26 April 2005
Guild Wars 2	ArenaNet	NCSoft	MMORPG	Windows, macOS	28 August 2012
Guild Wars Factions	ArenaNet	NCSoft	CORPG	Windows	28 April 2006
Guild Wars Nightfall	ArenaNet	NCSoft	CORPG	Windows	27 October 2006
Guitar Hero III: Legends of Rock	Neversoft	Aspyr Media	Music, Rhythm	Windows, Mac OS X	13 November 2007
Gunpoint	Suspicious Developments	Suspicious Developments	Action, adventure, puzzle platformer	Windows, Linux, macOS	3 June 2013
