= Gothic 1 Remake =

2026 video game

- Developer: Alkimia Interactive
- Publisher: THQ Nordic
- Director: Reinhard Pollice
- Producer: Reinhard Pollice
- Artist: Daniel Candil
- Writers: Nicolas Samuel Lietzau; Mattias Filler; Matteo Micheler
- Composer: Kai Rosenkranz
- Series: Gothic
- Engine: Unreal Engine 5
- Platforms: PlayStation 5; Windows; Xbox Series X/S
- Release: 5 June 2026
- Genre: Action role-playing
- Mode: Single-player

Gothic 1 Remake (or Gothic Remake) is a 2026 action role-playing game developed by Alkimia Interactive and published by THQ Nordic. It is a remake of the 2001 video game Gothic, originally developed by Piranha Bytes. The game was released on 5 June 2026 for PlayStation 5, Windows, and Xbox Series X/S. It received mixed reviews from critics and sold half a million units within the first week of release.

== Gameplay ==
Gothic 1 Remake is an action role-playing game played from a third-person perspective in a fantasy open world. The player controls a prisoner who is sent to a penal mining colony, called the Valley of Mines, which is surrounded by a magical barrier. As in the original Gothic, the nameless hero navigates the world without a minimap and starts without any skills. Lock picking was developed similarly to the original, but is presented differently.

== Development ==
In May 2019, the Austrian computer game publisher THQ Nordic acquired German developer Piranha Bytes, the creators and intellectual property owners of the Gothic series. Piranha Bytes declined to develop another Gothic game, instead choosing to focus on other games such as ELEX.

The Spanish branch of THQ Nordic, THQ Barcelona, released a game demo, titled Gothic Playable Teaser, in December 2019 and began a public survey to gather feedback regarding the demo and a potential remake of Gothic. Over 180,000 downloads of the demo were reported in March 2023 and over 30,000 responses, mostly mixed. According to THQ Nordic, over 90% of the players were in favor of producing a remake. THQ Nordic announced the remake's production in February 2020. The playable teaser was scrapped and a "complete reboot" was green-lit based on the community feedback, which called for a remake that was closer to the original.

Before beginning production, in March 2021, Alkimia Interactive was founded in Barcelona to develop a remake of Gothic. Some of the original developers of Gothic joined Alkimia, among them the composer, a dialogue writer and a programmer. In 2023, approximately 45 employees were working on the game, and over 50 employees in 2024. All employees were required to play the original game.

A main focus of development was non-player character (NPC) behavior, including character routines. The algorithm used 20–30-minute motion capture recordings, which were divided into individual sequences and categorized, referred to as "motion magic". According to the developers, iteration was given a lot of work-time during the production. Controls and the user interface were also improved to make the game more accessible. According to lead producer Reinhard Pollice, combat and skill systems were based on the original, in contrast to the playable teaser.

Due to increased design options and higher level of detail since 2001, Gothic 1 Remake's game world, which was based on the original, is 10–30% larger. As some places in the original game world were not fully designed, an attempt was made to "take up such potential", some locations were made more dense than others. New quests based on the camp affiliation were developed for these locations. Some quests from the original game were supplemented with additional plot options and narrative threads. Chapters 2 through 5, which were trimmed in the original game due to budget and time constraints, were expanded upon. The developers wished to better explain plot holes of the original. One narrative difference is that more content and lore about the orcs and their culture is present. The language of the orcs was expanded and professionalized with the assistance of a linguist. A tattoo artist also advised the developers.

The THQ studio Gate21, based in Sarajevo, was commissioned to design armor and NPCs. In contrast to the original, NPC armor models are varied for each character. The player character is able to alter the value of his armor through modifications, which in turn has an impact on armor appearance. Weapon smithing and cooking systems were expanded for the remake. In order to speed up the work process, NPC faces were created with deep learning AI. The development of those faces was a multi-year process, at the beginning of which the faces were designed manually. To avoid having repetitive faces (as was the case in the original) with around 600 NPCs in the game, the developers morphed face models together to create new faces.

Other additions include an adjustable camera angle in third-person perspective and the ability to adjust the balance/difficulty. Puzzles were revised to include "new interactions". While the original game took around 23 to 38 hours to complete, GameStar reported that an additional 20 hours are required for the remake.

The development did not end with the release of the game; several patches were released within the first three months after the release.

=== Engine and mod support ===
Gothic 1 Remake uses the Unreal Engine (UE), which was chosen for organizational reasons. During development, Alkimia Interactive switched from UE4 to UE5.4. To address performance issues with UE 5.4, the game uses the PSO precaching system of UE 5.7.

When asked about modding support for the remake, Alkimia Interactive, which itself consists of members who developed mods for Gothic and Gothic II, said that modding can be accomplished via AngelScript, a scripting language which was used "extensively for a lot of gameplay mechanics" during development.

=== Soundtrack, dialogue, and localization ===
Kai Rosenkranz, who composed the music for the original game, was also responsible for the soundtrack of the remake. Rosenkranz reinterpreted his original soundtrack and created new music. He used FMOD to implement his music.

Some dialogue from the original game was rewritten, and new dialogue was added. As in the original, the choice of dialogue options can determine the outcome of a conversation. Text-based localization for Chinese, French, Italian, Japanese and Spanish were developed. The English text localization was completely reworked, as Alkimia Interactive criticized that the original failed to convey the harshness of the German, Polish and Russian versions. The game is voiced in German and English, and in Polish and Russian due to the franchise's large fan bases in those languages. For the dubbing of the German, Polish and Russian versions, Alkimia Interactive hired voice actors who had worked on the original game, if voices didn't change drastically since.

== Release ==
The first trailer for Gothic 1 Remake was released in August 2022. Several artworks and screenshots of the remake were published on Steam in early 2023. Gameplay was first revealed in a trailer in August 2024, and a demo was presented at Gamescom in the same month, which differs from the finished remake in terms of gameplay and setting (e.g. no quick save mode, different player character). Since February 2025, the demo, titled "Nyras Prologue", is available on Steam. After the release of the demo 15,000 players participated in a survey about it. THQ Nordic posted "Making of" videos to their YouTube channel.

In February 2023, Alkimia Interactive claimed the development was "in the middle of production and therefore perfectly on schedule", but did not want to commit to a release date. In March 2023, the studio cited the year 2024 as a "realistic release timeline". In the same month, publisher THQ Nordic said it "did not want to name a final release period". In February 2026, THQ Nordic announced that the game would be released on 5 June 2026.

A "Collector's Edition" of Gothic 1 Remake, limited to 7,500 copies, was available for preorder. Bundled with the game a copy of the game on DVD is a wall decoration (a so-called sleeper mask with a wall mount), a notebook and a bracelet, each made of leather, and the game's soundtrack on CD. Physical copies of Gothic 1 Remake cannot be played without a one-time internet connection, as the complete game is not contained on the discs.

== Reception ==
=== Critical response ===
Reception

Aggregate scores
Aggregator	Score
Metacritic	74/100 (PC); 69/100 (PS5)
OpenCritic	57% recommend (Note: Based on 21 reviews)

Review scores
Publication	Score
4Players	9/10
Eurogamer	3/5
Game Informer	8/10
GamesRadar+	4/5
GameStar	83/100
IGN	7/10
PC Gamer (UK)	60/100
PC Games (DE)	8/10

Gothic 1 Remake received "mixed or average" reviews, according to review aggregator website Metacritic. OpenCritic determined that 57% of critics recommended the game.

Carlo Siebenhüner of PC Games said the game surprised him positively, lauding the atmosphere the game world as exuding a "Gothic feeling" The combat system would take some time to get used to, but the atmosphere is convincing. Stephanie Schlottag of GameStar criticized the absence of features in the review version and a difficulty level that was high even by Gothic standards. However, the publication also agreed that the classic "Gothic feel" had returned. Schlottag praised the new additions as blending well into the game and the progression system as rewarding. Stephan Zielke of the German console magazine GamePro praised the quests, exploration, and character development, while he criticized the balancing, combat system, controls, and technical aspects. Peter Steinlechner of the IT magazine Golem praised the atmosphere, exploration, and progression but criticized technical flaws. Patrick Poti of the online magazine 4Players described the game as a "feast for action-RPG players", though it criticized the technical execution; the game's faithfulness to the original was also viewed negatively. Martin Woger of Eurogamer criticized several issues that were present in the original game. Von Sascha Penzhorn of IGN Germany highlighted the visuals and faithfulness to the source material, while noting "technical issues and AI glitches" that needed to be addressed after release.

Due to specific bugs and problems that GameStar encountered with their review version, they downgraded their rating for the game by 7 points for as long as it is not patched accordingly. Due to technical problems on the PlayStation 5 Version, GamePro also downgraded their score.

=== Sales ===
According to THQ Nordic, Gothic 1 Remake sold 500,000 units across all platforms within the first week of release.

=== Awards ===
Year	Award	Category	Result	Ref.
2026	Golden Joystick Awards	Best Remake / Remaster	Pending	
