= Gothic (series) =

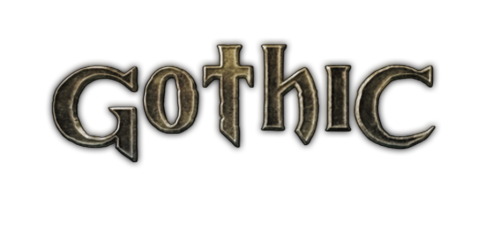
- Genre: Action role-playing
- Developers: Piranha Bytes (2001–2006); Trine Games (2008); HandyGames (2008); Spellbound Entertainment (2010–2011); Alkimia Interactive (2019–present)
- Publishers: Egmont Interactive, CD Projekt, Snowball Studios, Russobit-M, Atari, JoWooD Entertainment, Akella, Aspyr Media; THQ Nordic (2011–present)
- Creator: Piranha Bytes
- Platforms: Microsoft Windows, mobile phones, Xbox 360, PlayStation 3, PlayStation 4, Nintendo Switch
- First release: Gothic; 15 March 2001
- Latest release: Gothic 1 Remake; 5 June 2026

Gothic is a fantasy action role-playing game franchise created by German developer Piranha Bytes and since May 2019 owned by THQ Nordic. The series is known for its immersive and reactive world, where the environment and NPCs respond dynamically to the player's actions, making exploration and interaction with the world a core aspect of the gameplay.

The series debuted with the release of Gothic in 2001, followed by Gothic II in 2002 and its expansion Gothic II: Night of the Raven in 2003. The last main installment, Gothic 3, was released in 2006. A spin-off titled Arcania, was released in 2010 by Spellbound Entertainment but is considered separate from the main series after Piranha Bytes regained the rights in 2011.

At the time of its release, the series reached wide popularity in Germany and some Eastern-European countries, while little known in the rest of Europe and North America. Owing to its popularity in Poland in particular, where CD Projekt localized and published the main series of Gothic, the first two Gothic games became – according to developers of CD Projekt itself – a primary influence in CD Projekt's development of The Witcher role playing series.

In 2026 a remake of the first Gothic game was released.

== Games ==
Releases
Year	Title	Developer(s)	Publisher(s)	Platform(s)
Main series
2001	Gothic	Piranha Bytes	Egmont Interactive	Microsoft Windows; Nintendo Switch; Nintendo Switch 2 PlayStation 4 PlayStation 5 Xbox One; Xbox Series X/S iOS
2002	Gothic II	Piranha Bytes	JoWooD Entertainment	Microsoft Windows; Nintendo Switch; Nintendo Switch 2 PlayStation 4 PlayStation 5 Xbox One; Xbox Series X/S iOS
2003	Gothic II: Night of the Raven	Piranha Bytes	JoWooD Entertainment	Microsoft Windows; Nintendo Switch; Nintendo Switch 2 PlayStation 4 PlayStation 5 Xbox One; Xbox Series X/S iOS
2006	Gothic 3	Piranha Bytes	JoWooD Entertainment	Microsoft Windows; Nintendo Switch; Nintendo Switch 2 PlayStation 4 PlayStation 5 Xbox One; Xbox Series X/S iOS
Remake series
2026	Gothic 1 Remake	Alkimia Interactive	THQ Nordic	Microsoft Windows; Playstation 5 Xbox Series X/S
Spin-offs
2008	Gothic 3: Forsaken Gods	Trine Games	JoWooD Entertainment	Microsoft Windows
2010	Arcania	Spellbound Entertainment	JoWooD Entertainment	Microsoft Windows; Xbox 360; PlayStation 3 PlayStation 4
2011	Arcania: Fall of Setarrif	Spellbound Entertainment	JoWooD Entertainment	Microsoft Windows; Xbox 360; PlayStation 3 PlayStation 4
Other games
2008	Gothic 3: The Beginning	HandyGames	JoWooD Entertainment	Java ME
2019	Gothic Playable Teaser	THQ Barcelona / Alkimia Interactive	THQ Nordic	Microsoft Windows

== Main series ==
Release timeline
2001	Gothic
2002	Gothic II
2003	Gothic II: Night of the Raven
2004–2005
2006	Gothic 3
2007
2008	Gothic 3: The Beginning
2008	Gothic 3: Forsaken Gods
2009
2010	Arcania
2011	Arcania: Fall of Setarrif
2012
2013	Arcania: The Complete Tale
2014–2018
2019	Gothic Playable Teaser
2020
2021	The Chronicles of Myrtana: Archolos
2022–2025
2026	Gothic 1 Remake

=== Gothic ===
The first game of the franchise was released on 15 March 2001 in Germany, on 30 October 2001 in Europe, on 23 November 2001 in North America and on 28 March 2002 in Poland.

The game takes place in a Dark medieval fantasy world, in which humans are losing the war against the orcs. The hero, a young nameless man, is forced to work in the Penal Colony, because of his crimes. In order to continue the fight against the orcs, the king needs to extract magical ore and use it for weapons and armor. Every burglar, thief or other criminal is sent in the Colony to work in the mines, by the king's order. To keep the prisoners inside, the king ordered 12 magicians to create a Magical Barrier over the colony. However, due to complications, the Barrier trapped a much larger territory than originally intended, along with the 12 magicians and the king's forces. Thus the militia blocked inside soon lost control over the prisoners, and the king had no choice but to trade with the convicts. Soon after the convicts divided into several camps, one of which the Man can join in order to survive and advance the plot.

The game had a cameo appearance of the popular German Medieval metal band In Extremo, who played the song Herr Mannelig in-game.

=== Gothic II ===
Gothic II is the second game in the Gothic franchise, released on 23 November 2002 in Germany, on 13 June 2003 in Europe and 29 October 2003 in North America. It's the sequel to Gothic.

The game events continue the ones from the first Gothic – as the Barrier was destroyed, many prisoners escaped; many of them headed to Khorinis with fake titles (since the militia started to search for the escaped convicts), and others remained in the mountains forming groups of bandits. But things aren't quite that good in Khorinis, as many thought – Xardas (the hero's mentor) informs him that a greater evil is now threatening the land – as The Sleeper was banished he made a last call to all his minions to gather in the Valley of Mines.

==== Gothic II: Night of the Raven ====
Gothic II: Night of the Raven is the official expansion for Gothic II. It was released on 22 August 2003 in Germany and on 20 January 2005 in North America and Europe as a part of the Gothic II Gold package.

The expansion introduces a new world to the game called Jharkendar which is located in the northeast of Khorinis. It is an ancient and deserted city, populated mostly by pirates and bandits.

The hero opens a portal to Jharkendar with the help of the Water Mages, and after getting there, discovers what threatens the island: Raven, a former ore baron in the Penal Colony who has sold his soul to Beliar, the god of darkness, and is hungry for power.

=== Gothic 3 ===
Gothic 3 is the third and last game in the main Gothic franchise and the official sequel to Gothic II. It was released on 13 October 2006 in Europe and on 20 November 2006 in North America.

The third part of the saga shows the hero and his friends sailing to Myrtana. After getting there, they discover that the continent has been overrun by orcs which have enslaved mankind. The hero also gets another hint, when he finds out from locals that Xardas, his mentor, is the one who helped the orcs with their evil scheme. Things will change later, when the hero discovers Xardas and finds out that he only helped the orcs for his own purpose. He quests the hero to retrieve some artifacts and kill the king which had imprisoned him in the Colony; after that, they (Xardas and the hero) went together through a portal into an unknown land.

== Remake series ==
=== Gothic: Remake ===
In February 2020, THQ Nordic announced the production of a remake of the first game of the series to be developed by Alkimia Interactive. The Remake was in production since May 2020 and launched June 5, 2026.

== Spin-off ==
=== Gothic 3: Forsaken Gods ===
Gothic 3: Forsaken Gods is the standalone expansion for Gothic 3 developed by Trine Games. It was released on 21 November 2008 in Europe and North America.

Two years have passed since the hero and Xardas went into the Unknown Lands. From there, they were watching over Myrtana – which was destroyed by wars between the factions. The hero could stand no more, seeing that the land for which he almost gave his life for was destroyed, and decided to return. Xardas refused to let him go and tried to explain that eventually mankind will tire of war and peace will prevail. The angered hero refused to listen, and after a great battle which almost killed him, returned to Myrtana to unite it. Eventually the hero will crown himself the new king of Myrtana.

=== Arcania ===
Arcania (originally released as Arcania: Gothic 4) was released on 12 October 2010 as the fourth game in the Gothic franchise. As of 2011, with the return of the Gothic rights to Piranha Bytes, Arcania has become an independent series, a spin-off from the original series.

In September 2014, Nordic Games dropped Gothic 4 from the game's title, with no statement being offered so far of why this action has been done, but left fans speculating that it may be related with Piranha Bytes getting back the rights to the Gothic series. Also all references that connected Arcania with the Gothic series have been removed from the game's description.

Arcania is the first game in the series which will have a new hero. Also, it is the first game in the franchise which was released for two platforms: Microsoft Windows and Xbox 360. While delayed, the game was also released for PlayStation 3. The fourth game was also being developed by a different company, Spellbound Entertainment.

The events in Arcania continue directly from Forsaken Gods. Arcania will introduce players for the first time to the Southern Islands. 10 years have passed; the self-crowned king has turned rogue and has destroyed/overrun parts of the Southern Islands. A new hero arises, after he finds his hometown destroyed by the evil king. Great threats await the new hero as he quests for revenge.

He eventually discovers during his quest for revenge that it wasn't the king who destroyed his village but a rogue element in his army and finds out that he is the only one who can put an end to the demon that was tormenting the king. In the end, after receiving his revenge, the hero also puts an end to the demon's possession of Rhobar but it is then summoned by enemies that were long since thought to have been defeated, thereby setting the stage for a possible sequel.

==== Arcania: Fall of Setarrif ====
Announced by Spellbound and JoWooD on 9 December 2010, Fall of Setarrif is the first standalone addon for Arcania, which was released on 25 October 2011 for PC and 31 May 2013 for PlayStation 3 and Xbox 360.

Arcania: Fall of Setarrif ties up the loose ends of the main game's story and adds yet another chapter to the epic tale. After the demon that possessed King Rhobar III was exorcised, it made its way to Setarrif to find a new host. In Setarrif, which is cut off from the rest of the island, chaos and anarchy spread rapidly.

King Rhobar III is troubled by these developments and is afraid of losing the city and some of his companions, which are in Setarrif at that very moment. The nameless hero is therefore sent by the king and must journey to Setarrif… But he has no idea of what lies before him.

== Other games ==
=== Gothic 3: The Beginning ===
Gothic 3: The Beginning is a role-playing mobile video game produced by German developer Handy-Games GmbH and published by JoWooD Entertainment. It was released on 15 January 2008.

The action takes place 140 years before the events in the first Gothic game, on the island of Khorinis. Xardas (one of the main characters from the original PC Gothic series), an orphan, raised by farmers, is visited one night by the ghost of Buthomar. The ghost tells the young Xardas about an unknown threat and asks him to find "the other four Chosen Ones".

=== Gothic Playable Teaser ===
Gothic Playable Teaser is a prototype remake of the original Gothic that serves for community feedback. It was developed by THQ Nordic Barcelona and added to Steam on 13 December 2019 for all owners of any game by Piranha Bytes. In March 2021, THQ Nordic announced that they had established a new studio, Alkimia Interactive, that will work on a full remake of the first Gothic.

== History ==
=== Gothic Universe Edition ===
In October 2007, JoWooD published Gothic Universe Edition, a collection pack containing Gothic, Gothic II and Gothic 3. The Universe Edition was originally released only in Europe, but was added to the Steam store in November 2010.

=== Ownership shift in 2007-2011 ===
Speculations on who has the rights for the Gothic series have made their way around since 2007 until 2011, when Mike Hoge, co-founder of Piranha Bytes, Gothic's creator, stated that soon (after the release of Risen 2: Dark Waters) the rights for the series would return to Piranha Bytes, but avoided mentioning if they would develop another game within the series.

Later in 2011, it was confirmed by JoWooD Entertainment that they only had rights for the fourth game in the series and the expansion. As such, the rights returned to its former developer, Piranha Bytes.

=== The Gothic Series on Nintendo Switch ===
In 2023, THQ Nordic released the first two installments of the series on the Nintendo Switch. THQ Nordic has prepared a portable console port of the original game code, without remastering and without modifications (although with numerous improvements). The first part of the series, Gothic (released as Gothic Classic), was released on September 28, 2023. The second part, Gothic II, along with the Night of the Raven expansion (released as Gothic II: Complete Classic), premiered on November 28, 2023.

== See also ==
- Risen (series), a similar game series by the developer of the first three games
- Elex, a game by the developer of the first three games
- Elex 2, a game by the developer of the first three games
- Video gaming in Germany
