= Swampweed =

Swampweed may refer to:

- Hygrophila (plant), a plant genus in the family Acanthaceae
- Selliera radicans, a plant species in the family Goodeniaceae
- Swampweed, a fictional plant species inspired by Cannabis which appears in the PC role-playing game Gothic (video game) released in 2001.
