= Gothic II: Night of the Raven =

- German cover of the expansion pack
- Developer: Piranha Bytes
- Publisher: JoWooD Productions
- Designer: Michael Hoge
- Composer: Kai Rosenkranz
- Series: Gothic
- Platforms: Windows; Nintendo Switch
- Release: GER: 20 August 2003 (PC); WW: 29 November 2023 (NS); WW: September 29, 2026 (PS4&5, Xbox One & X/S
- Genre: Action role-playing
- Mode: Single-player

Gothic II: Night of the Raven (German: Gothic II: Die Nacht des Raben) is the expansion pack of the action role-playing video game Gothic II. It focuses on further enlarging the story already presented in the original Gothic II game by adding a world called Jharkendar and additional attributes, items and weapons.

Upon its first release in 2003 the game was available in the German language only, the English version only being released in 2005, as part of the Gothic II Gold package. A port titled Gothic II Complete Classic including the original Gothic II was released for Nintendo Switch in 2023 and will be released for PlayStation 4 and 5, Xbox One and Xbox Series X/S in 2026.

== Gameplay ==
The expansion brings many significant changes to the gameplay. A major change can be seen in terms of difficulty, where the developers had rebalanced the whole game and made it harder, after this was requested by the community.

This increase in difficulty is done by adding new, more powerful animals, reducing the number of potions, and special plants found in the game, making attributes and items more expensive, and reducing the effect of permanent potions.

An addition brought by the gameplay consists of a few new skills and special items. The player now can learn the language of the ancient people which inhabited the newly introduced city of Jharkendar, giving him the possibility to read stone tablets. These can be found across the whole Khorinian island, and increase the player's attributes.

Night of the Raven also re-introduces another skill that was absent in the regular Gothic II, "Acrobatics". Unlike in Gothic, this skill is automatically learned when reaching 90 points of dexterity, and cannot be learned otherwise.

== Synopsis ==
=== Setting ===
The canyon located in the northwest of Jharkendar

In addition to the world already introduced by Gothic II, the addon brings a new world, called Jharkendar. The new world is split into various areas, each presenting a different type of climate. Several temples, belonging to the ancient people that inhabited Jharkendar, can be seen along Jharkendar.

In the northwest of the island, near the pirate camp, a canyon is located, while in the eastern part, a swamp can be found, in which the bandits have established a camp. The so-called "House of Scholars" can be found in the canyon area, while in the swamp, in the camp of the bandits, the "Temple of Adanos", also referred to as the "House of Warriors", is located.

In the south of the island, a large portion of the land is occupied by mountains which separate Jharkendar from Khorinis, and the rest of the island.

=== Plot ===
The expanded version of the story from the original Gothic II, told by the addon, introduces a new world called Jharkendar. Situated in the northeast of Khorinis, Jharkendar is presented as an ancient, deserted city. The player helps the Water Mages, also present in Gothic, but which were missing in Gothic II, open a portal, found in an old temple in the land of Khorinis. The developers have also included several cut-scenes that add to the flavor of the game by referring back to events that take place in Gothic. This provides a greater sense of continuity for players that have played both games.

After managing to open the portal to the ancient city of Jharkendar, the hero learns about the dangers threatening the island. With the help of the pirates (also a new guild introduced by the addon), the hero manages to defeat Raven (a character from the first Gothic, which also was not present in the second part of the franchise). Following the defeat of Raven, the hero recovers Beliar's Claw, an ancient artifact.

In the continuation of the story, the player is confronted with the same plot present in the original game.

In addition to this new area of the world, many seemingly meaningless locations (and characters) in the original Gothic II were modified and found a purpose in the expansion – namely, the ancient ruins in the northeast, the Stonehenge-like structures scattered throughout the countryside, and the bandit camp near the landowner's farm.
