= Arcania: Gothic 4 =

2010 video game

Arcania
- Developers: Spellbound Entertainment; Black Forest Games (PS3 & X360)
- Publishers: JoWooD Entertainment; Nordic Games (console ports)
- Director: Daniel Miller
- Producer: BVT Games Fund III
- Designer: André Beccu
- Composer: Dynamedion
- Series: Gothic
- Engine: Vision 7
- Platforms: Microsoft Windows; Xbox 360; PlayStation 3 PlayStation 4
- Release: Microsoft Windows & Xbox 360: AU: 14 October 2010 (PC); NA: 19 October 2010; AU: 21 October 2010 (X360); EU: 29 October 2010; Arcania: The Complete Tale; PlayStation 3: EU: 15 July 2013; AU: 1 August 2013; NA: 30 August 2013; Xbox 360: AU: 15 July 2013; EU: 30 August 2013; NA: 8 November 2013; PlayStation 4: PAL: 8 May 2015; NA: 12 May 2015
- Genre: Action role-playing
- Mode: Single-player

Arcania (originally released as Arcania: Gothic 4) is an action role-playing video game, spin-off of the Gothic series, developed by Spellbound Entertainment. It was published by JoWooD Entertainment in 2010.

The game was released on 12 October 2010 for Microsoft Windows and Xbox 360. In 2013, Nordic Games released Arcania and its expansion, Arcania: Fall of Setarrif, as Arcania: The Complete Tale, for PlayStation 3 and Xbox 360, followed by the PlayStation 4 version in May 2015.

== Gameplay ==
In comparison to the predecessors, the game mechanics were simplified. For instance, there are only three spells available (but upgradable). Also, the character can only interact with "named" characters, those who have a name.

There is no sleeping mechanic so the player can't sleep for a chosen period of time like in previous games. The player is able to wield any weapon as there are no statistic requirements. There are no teachers within the game like in previous parts and all skills can be learned by using the skill tree.

== Plot ==
War covers over the Southern Islands and reaches the isle of Feshyr in the Southern Seas. The protagonist of Arcania returns from an adventure to find his home and village torched and looted. The aggressors' ships – with an Eagle displayed on their billowing sails – escape over the horizon.

Seeking revenge, the hero leaves the destroyed village behind and soon realizes that this attack did not just happen on a corrupt king's whim. An evil power lies waiting at the threshold of this world, and the hero will need to face this nameless evil. Yet the hero is not alone – his fate is linked to that of a mysterious lady as well as an artifact from the past.

== Development ==
The start of the development was officially announced on 23 August 2007, along with the name of the new developer. The project was originally entitled Gothic 4: Genesis; the name change to Gothic 4: Arcania was announced in 2008. At the Games Convention in 2008, JoWooD Entertainment announced another name for the game – "Arcania: A Gothic Tale". The name change serves two purposes. First, it hints at a world rich in magic and fantasy. Second, and completely from a marketing perspective, it helps give the Gothic franchise a fresh start in North America, where it has failed to gain significant popularity. During a press conference of the Polish distributor CD Projekt, the games to be published by the company were presented, including Arcania. The title of the game was stated as Arcania: Gothic 4. A Polish fan-site asked the community manager Reinhard Pollice, known as Megalomaniac, regarding that issue and he confirmed the change of the name. On 1 April, JoWooD marketing manager Clemens Schneidhofer confirmed the new name to GamersGlobal.de: "I can confirm that! Because the date of the release is already defined (more details soon in a press release), we decided to leave the working title "Arcania – A Gothic Tale" behind and to announce the final name "Arcania – Gothic 4". This change is available for all countries (EU & US)."

As announced at the CD Projekt Conference 2010, Spellbound Entertainment was developing the Xbox 360 and Microsoft Windows versions, while later, another studio would port the game on the PlayStation 3 system. Later news confirmed that the PlayStation 3 version had been delayed until 2011, while the Xbox 360 and Microsoft Windows release remained unchanged. At the 2008 Games Convention in Leipzig, JoWooD Entertainment presented Arcania behind closed doors.

JoWooD and Spellbound Entertainment announced cooperation with Trinigy, a provider of 3D game engine technology. In the scope of a multi-platform license agreement, Spellbound is developing Arcania: Gothic 4 utilizing Trinigy's Vision Engine 7, with certain features from the newly released Vision Engine 8.

Arcania's physics engine is NVIDIA PhysX as confirmed by a JoWooD Entertainment representative.

In 2009, JoWooD Entertainment released the official website for Arcania: Gothic 4, revealing new information, screenshots and artworks. In August 2009 JoWooD Entertainment announced that Arcania: Gothic 4 would be delayed until 2010, giving Spellbound more time to polish the game.

JoWooD Entertainment planned to make Arcania an AAA title – the most successful title from the Gothic series, and one of the best RPGs of 2010. In September 2009 the Gothic Community sent a letter to JoWooD Entertainment, complaining about the lack of support and information regarding Arcania: Gothic 4.

In March 2010, Dr. Albert Seidl, JoWooD's former CEO, revealed that Arcania would be released in the autumn of 2010. In June 2010, Franz Rossler, JoWooD's CEO, confirmed via interview that Arcania's release date had been scheduled for October 2010. A demo for the game was released on 24 September 2010.

Arcania was first presented to the general public in August at Gamescom in Köln, Germany. The short playable part featured the very beginning of the game.

== Release ==
The game was released in October 2010 for Microsoft Windows and Xbox 360. JoWooD announced on 13 October 2010 via its CEO, Franz Rossler, that Arcania would receive several add-ons in 2011.

A patch for the game was released on 23 November 2010 for the PC platform. The update slightly altered specific gameplay dynamics, increased the overall performance, and improved stability.

On 9 December 2010, JoWooD announced that they would release Arcania: Fall of Setarrif in 2011 – the first addon of several planned add-ons for Arcania. Besides several hours of gameplay, new monsters locations and quests, the add-on introduced a new feature – the possibility to play as known characters from the Gothic series. In November 2012, Nordic Games announced that Arcania: Gothic 4 and its expansion, Arcania: Fall of Setarrif would be available in 2013 as Arcania: The Complete Tale for PlayStation 3 and Xbox 360.

== Expansion ==
In October 2011 Fall of Setarrif was finally released for the PC after a long delay and offers four to eight hours additional gameplay. The PlayStation 3 version was released in May 2013 under the title Arcania – The Complete Tale, including the Arcania – Fall of Setarrif expansion.

== Reception ==
Reception

Aggregate score
Aggregator	Score			
Aggregator	PC	PS3	PS4	Xbox 360
Metacritic	63/100	42/100	42/100	64/100

Review scores
Publication	Score			
Publication	PC	PS3	PS4	Xbox 360
Eurogamer	4/10	N/A	N/A	N/A
Famitsu	N/A	N/A	N/A	30/40
Game Informer	6.75/10	N/A	N/A	6.75/10
GameSpot	N/A	N/A	N/A	5/10
IGN	7.5/10	N/A	N/A	7.5/10
PlayStation Official Magazine – UK	N/A	5/10	N/A	N/A
Official Xbox Magazine (US)	N/A	N/A	N/A	7.5/10
PC Format	51%	N/A	N/A	N/A
PC Gamer (UK)	76%	N/A	N/A	N/A
PC PowerPlay	7/10	N/A	N/A	N/A
The Digital Fix	N/A	4/10	N/A	N/A

The PC and Xbox 360 versions of Arcania received "mixed" reviews, while the PlayStation 3 and PlayStation 4 versions of Arcania: The Complete Tale received "generally unfavorable reviews", according to the review aggregation website Metacritic. While the game was praised for its graphics and production values, it was criticized heavily for doing away with many elements of previous Gothic installments in order to make the game friendlier to casual players and failing to meet expectations of the series' fans. By October 2010, Arcania had sold 200,000 units in Europe.

GameSpot said of the Xbox 360 version: "Arcania has been dumbed down into a generic action role-playing game, so it isn't a Gothic game in anything but its subtitle." IGN complemented the great graphics of the PC and Xbox 360 versions as well as their "loot-heavy dungeon crawling experience that doesn't tax your skills" as well as the way Gothic 4 allows for the player to play leisurely and enjoy the world. In Japan, where the Xbox 360 version was ported and published by CyberFront on 24 March 2011, followed by the PC version on 14 April 2011, Famitsu gave the former console version a score of two eights and two sevens for a total of 30 out of 40.

== Sequel ==
According to an interview with JoWooD's former CEO Albert Seidl, it seemed that a sequel was once planned.
