= Gothic (video game) =

2001 video game

- Developer: Piranha Bytes
- Publishers: Windows: DE: Egmont Interactive; NA/EU: Xicat Interactive; Nintendo Switch, PlayStation 4 & 5, Xbox One & Xbox Series: WW: THQ Nordic
- Directors: Stefan Nyul; Alexander Brüggemann; Michael Hoge
- Designers: Michael Hoge; Alexander Brüggemann; Tom Putzki; Stefan Nyul
- Programmers: Dieter Hildebrand; Bert Speckels; Ulf Wohlers; Carsten Edenfeldl
- Artists: Michael Hoge; Horst Dworczak
- Composer: Kai Rosenkranz
- Series: Gothic
- Engine: ZenGin
- Platforms: Windows; Nintendo Switch
- Release: Windows: DE: 15 March 2001; EU: 30 October 2001; NA: 23 November 2001; PL: 28 March 2002; Nintendo Switch: WW: September 28, 2023; PlayStation 4 & 5, Xbox One & Xbox Series: WW: July 28, 2026
- Genre: Action role-playing
- Mode: Single-player

Gothic is a 2001 action role-playing game developed by Piranha Bytes for Windows and the first game of the Gothic game franchise. A port, titled Gothic Classic, was released in 2023 and in 2026 for Nintendo Switch, PlayStation 4, PlayStation 5, Xbox One, Xbox Series X/S and iOS.

Gothic was well-received by critics, who credited the game for its story, world design, atmosphere, interaction with other in-game characters, and graphics, but criticized it for its many bugs, an unusual control scheme and high system requirements. The English localization was described as less well written than the language versions in which the game became popular. Gothic was one of the first European RPGs with fully voiced dialogues. At the time of its release and with the release of patches in the early 2000s, Gothic and its sequels became popular in Germany and Austria, Poland, and Russia, which led to the creation of fan and modding communities in said countries.

In 2026, a remake of the game, titled Gothic 1 Remake, was published by THQ Nordic, who owns the rights to the series after the acquisition and subsequent dissolution of Piranha Bytes.

== Gameplay ==
Main aspects of the gameplay include interactivity of the environment and exploration. While the story line is at some point of the game linear, the player character/protagonist is relatively unguided in the first phases of the game. He does not have a map and if he finds or buys one, it does not tell him more than his current position (no quest markers etc.), which promotes having to stay watchful while exploring the world. The player decides which camp to join relatively early in the game, but the quests become increasingly linear as the game progresses, meaning the differences between the various factions disappear later in the game as there are no more camp affiliated quests to solve.

The player character (the so called "nameless hero"), who is unskilled/untrained at the beginning, must complete quests and slay enemies (e.g. wild animals and monsters) to earn skill points, which are used to increase basic attributes and learn and improve skills. They are spent by finding the appropriate teacher. Several skills have only one "level" (Sneaking, Acrobatics), while Pickpocketing and the fighting skills (one-handed weapons, two-handed weapons, bows and crossbows) have two proficiency levels. With each upgrade in fighting skills the player character has got improved weapon handling and faster combinations of attacks. If the Hero chooses to be a Mage (or joins the Swamp Camp), he will be able to learn Circles of Magic; of which there are 6. The major difference between the three factions in terms of character development is that Swamp Camp members cannot become mages, because they are limited to four magic circles (out of six). However, they gain access to magic earlier. The main attributes (strength, dexterity and mana) are increased in 1 or 5 point increments, starting at 10 and capping off at 100 (although the cap can be surpassed with the use of potions). Hunting wild animals can earn the player raw meat. This heals damage and can be sold. However, by using a stove or frying pan, the player may also choose to turn this into grilled meat, which heals much more effectively. Similarly, most of the activities other characters can be seen doing (playing musical instruments, stirring soup pots, urinating etc.) can be done by the main character as well (although with the exception of forging weapons these activities have little bearing on the game).

== Synopsis ==
=== Setting ===
Gothic takes place in an open world medieval fantasy realm in which humans are fighting a losing war against the Orcs, a humanoid race. In order to fight back, the king needs to extract magical ore from mines, which can be used to forge more powerful weapons and armor. Therefore he decides to send every man who has committed a crime to the ore mines.

To prevent the convicts from escaping, he orders his 12 most powerful magicians to erect a magical dome called the Barrier over the mining colony. However, the Barrier goes out of control during its erection and grows large enough to cover the entire valley, trapping the magicians inside and giving the convicts a chance to kill the distracted guards and take control over the colony. The king, who is not trapped within the Barrier, is thus forced to come to an agreement with the prisoners, trading goods for ore.

Soon after the erection of the Barrier, the convicts separate into three different groups. The Old Camp controls one of the two operational ore mines and trades with the king. The New Camp controls the other ore mine but refuses to trade the ore they mine, instead planning to use its magical power to explode the Barrier. The Brotherhood (Swamp Camp) produces and trades Swampweed with the other camps and believe in a god called the Sleeper. The magicians that created the Barrier also divided, forming the Fire Mages, who joined the Old Camp, and the Water Mages, who joined the New Camp.

=== Plot ===
An unnamed prisoner, called the hero, is thrown inside the mining colony, tasked to deliver a letter to the Order of the Magicians of Fire, which is stationed inside of the Old Camp. After getting the chance to talk with the magicians, the hero learns that Xardas, the head of the Fire Mages who is supposed to receive the letter, has deserted in order to study black magic.

After joining one of the three camps, the hero aids the Sect Camp prepare the invocation of the Sleeper, which they believe will show them the way to escape the colony. During the ritual, the members have a vague vision, and Y'Berion, the leader of the Brotherhood who performed the ritual, collapses after contacting the Sleeper. In the vision, the sect members are shown the way to an old Orc cemetery. A guru and a few templars, together with the hero, set off towards the indicated place. Once there, the templars die fighting the Orcs they meet, and only the guru and the hero survive. After searching the entire underground complex the two fail to find anything. The guru goes insane and attempts to kill the hero, accusing him of being the reason that the Sleeper refuses to reveal himself.

After defeating the guru, the hero returns to the camp of the Brotherhood, finding Y'Berion still weakened. Y'Berion warns the camp about the true evil nature of the god they thought was leading them on the path to freedom. He places his hopes on the escape plan of the Water Mages from the New Camp to blow up the Barrier using the power of the magical ore. Despite efforts to help him recover, Y'Berion dies.

Bearing information about the recent events, the hero is granted permission to see the Water Mages, who ask for help with their escape plan. After the hero acquires all of the required artifacts with the help of four convicts he befriends, the Water Mages now require the help of the Fire Mages to channel the magical energy. However, the hero discovers that the Old Camp's gates are closed after their ore mine collapsed. Fearful that this incident would deprive him of his power, the leader of the Old Camp sent his men to take control of the New Camp's mine and killed the protesting Fire Mages; only Milten, the youngest of the magicians, managed to escape.

With no other options, the Water Mages send the hero to seek the aid of Xardas, the magician who deserted the Fire Mages. However, Xardas refuses to help and thinks that their plan will not succeed. Instead, he tells the hero that during his studies, he learned that the Sleeper was summoned by the Orcs to aid them against their enemies, and that the demon is in a temple deep underneath the Orc city. With the help of Xardas, the hero enters the Sleeper's temple and defeats the demon. The Barrier collapses and frees the prisoners of the colony.

== Development ==
German company Piranha Bytes worked more than four years on the development of Gothic's technology. The game engine was created completely in-house with a modified version later used for Gothic II.

== Marketing and release ==
Gothic was first released on 15 March 2001 in Germany, Austria and Switzerland, published by Egmont Interactive. Xicat Interactive released the game through THQ in the UK on 30 October 2001, followed by the North American release on 23 November 2001.

A port for the original Xbox was planned to release at the end of 2002 but was cancelled.

In February 2006, an international re-release was announced to prepare for Gothic 3. In the course of the re-release, an English demo version was made available at the official website.

In Germany and some other countries, Gothic is also available in a collector's edition, bundled with Gothic II and Gothic II: Night of the Raven, and Gothic – Fan Edition, including the official map of the Colony and a variety of extras.

== Variations ==
- In the German version the medieval rock band In Extremo has a virtual performance in the Old Camp, where they perform their acoustic cover of "Herr Mannelig". As long as the player is in the second chapter, the band plays next to the entrance to the castle. The performance has been removed from non-German publications for licensing reasons.
- The International version of Gothic was slightly censored: a bathing slave was given a bra that she does not wear in the German version.

== Reception ==
Reception

Aggregate score
Aggregator	Score
Metacritic	81/100

Review scores
Publication	Score
Computer Gaming World	3.5/5
Eurogamer	8/10
GameSpot	7.2/10
GameSpy	4/5
GameZone	7.9/10
IGN	8.6/10
PC Gamer (UK)	74%
PC Gamer (US)	75%
PC Zone	74%

Award
Publication	Award
GameStar	Adventure Game of the Year (2001); Best Game World

The game received "generally favorable reviews" according to the review aggregation website Metacritic. IGN concluded that "Gothic is a solid role-playing experience" and Eurogamer said that it is a game that "developers should look to as an example of how a role-playing adventure should be done". GameSpot gave the game a slightly less positive review saying that despite Gothic's achievements in terms of story and dialogue, players might still be disappointed by its shallow character development and poor combat mechanics.

GameLive PC named Gothic the third-best role-playing game of 2001–2002 behind Dungeon Siege and The Elder Scrolls III: Morrowind. The editors of Computer Games Magazine nominated Gothic as the best role-playing game of 2001, but ultimately gave the award to Arcanum: Of Steamworks and Magick Obscura and Wizardry 8 (tie). It was also a runner-up for RPG Vault's 2001 "RPG of the Year" prize, which it lost again to Arcanum. However, it won in the publication's "Surprise of the Year" category; the editors called it "a very solid, enjoyable debut effort".

In 2022, it has been described as "probably the most known Eurojank title".

The English version was described as not as well written as the German, Polish and Russian versions.

== Influence ==
According to CD Projekt, which localized and published the game in Poland, the first two Gothic games were a major source of inspiration in the development of The Witcher game series.

== See also ==
- 2001 in video gaming
- Risen, a similar game by the same developer
- Video gaming in Germany
