= Risen (series) =

- Genre: Action role-playing
- Developer: Piranha Bytes
- Publisher: Deep Silver
- Creator: Piranha Bytes
- Platforms: Microsoft Windows, PlayStation 3, PlayStation 4, Xbox 360, Xbox One, Nintendo Switch
- First release: Risen; October 2, 2009
- Latest release: Risen 3: Titan Lords; August 12, 2014

Risen is an action role-playing game franchise developed by the German company Piranha Bytes. It is published and distributed by the German company Deep Silver, a division of Koch Media.

The franchise is close to the three first episodes of the Gothic franchise, also developed by Piranha Bytes.

== Games ==
The games in the Risen franchise are:

- Risen (2009)
- Risen 2: Dark Waters (2012)
- Risen 3: Titan Lords (2014)

=== Risen ===
- Developer: Piranha Bytes
- Publisher: Deep Silver, THQ Nordic
- Platform: Microsoft Windows, Xbox 360, PlayStation 4, Xbox One, Nintendo Switch
- Release Date: October 2, 2009 (international version)
  24 January 2023 (PlayStation 4, Xbox One, Nintendo Switch)
- Graphic Engine: Internal development by Piranha Bytes

The audio of the international version is multilingual: German, English and French. More than 200,000 copies of the first game were sold in Germany.

=== Risen 2: Dark Waters ===
- Developer: Piranha Bytes
- Publisher: Deep Silver
- Platform: Microsoft Windows, PlayStation 3, Xbox 360
- Release Date: April 27, 2012
- Graphic Engine: Internal development by Piranha Bytes

=== Risen 3: Titan Lords ===
- Developer: Piranha Bytes
- Publisher: Deep Silver
- Platform: Microsoft Windows, PlayStation 3, PlayStation 4, Xbox 360
- Release Date: August 12, 2014
- Graphic Engine: Internal development by Piranha Bytes

== See also ==
- Gothic, a similar franchise by the same developer
