= Risen 3: Titan Lords =

2014 video game

- North American Windows cover art
- Developer: Piranha Bytes
- Publisher: Deep Silver
- Director: Michael Rüve
- Programmer: Philipp Krause
- Artist: Kristoffer Lerch
- Writer: Björn Pankratz
- Series: Risen
- Platforms: Microsoft Windows, PlayStation 3, Xbox 360, PlayStation 4 (PSN)
- Release: WIN, X360, PS3: NA: 12 August 2014; AU: 14 August 2014; EU: 15 August 2014; PS4 (PSN): WW: 21 August 2015
- Genre: Action role-playing
- Mode: Single-player

Risen 3: Titan Lords is a 2014 action role-playing game developed by Piranha Bytes and published by Deep Silver for Windows, Xbox 360 and PlayStation 3. It is the sequel to Risen 2: Dark Waters and the third installment in the Risen series. The game received mixed reviews.

An Enhanced Edition of the game was released in August 2015 for the PlayStation 4. It was also provided as a free upgrade for PC players who own the game and all its DLC on Steam.

== Plot ==
Abandoned by all the gods and suffering from the Titan Wars, a new threat rises from the soil. The player is placed in the role of a new "Nameless Hero", replacing the protagonist from the two previous games. The new player character was never seen nor mentioned prior to the third game, but is revealed to be the brother of recurring NPC Patty Steelbeard, and son of the deceased pirate captain Gregorius Emanuel Steelbeard, as well as one of the few pirate captains left in the world.

The Hero is awoken from a fitful dream in which he fights the ghost of the pirate captain Crow, who was killed in Risen 2: Dark Waters. The Hero and Patty go ashore on the Crab Coast to seek a rumored treasure in an ancient native temple, but are distracted by a Skull Cave rising from the ruins and a number of shadowy creatures emerging from it. When they enter to investigate, they find a magic portal made of crystal, which spawns a demonic Shadow Lord which surprises them and knocks them to the ground. The Shadow Lord proceeds to consume the Hero's soul, apparently killing him, and leaving Patty and his crew to bury him.

Some time later, the witch doctor Bones comes ashore on the island and performs a ritual on the Hero's corpse, which awakens him from death. Bones reveals that he is not quite alive, as his soul is trapped in the Underworld, and that his voodoo magic was only able to reanimate his corpse. The longer he is away from his soul, the more he will lose his mind and will eventually become a mindless minion of the Shadows. Bones tells the Hero that he himself had once lost his soul (part of a quest in Risen 2) and had it restored, but due to the Hero's soul being held captive by the Shadows, recovering it will be significantly more complicated. He suggests that the Hero seek guidance from the most powerful sorcerers in the Southern Seas, which include the voodoo witch Chani (a companion in Risen 2), the high magician Zacharias on Taranis, and the druid Eldric (a recurring NPC from the first game), who is now leading an ancient order of Demon Hunters to fight the Shadows.

Throughout the story, the Hero tries to fight back against the Shadows, helping recover ground lost in the sudden and tremendous invasion. On the pirate settlement of Antigua, Admiral Alvarez beseeches the Hero to travel to the most powerful communities in the Southern Seas to request their aid in fighting back against the Shadows, in particular the fleet of demon ships revealed to be led by the ghost captain Crow, and the massive sea creatures which have been driven into the seas to wreak havoc.

While seeking knowledge from the sorcerers and their respective communities, the Hero also aids them in fighting the Shadows and destroying the Crystal Portals that summon them, in exchange for lending their aid to Antigua, and also seeks out the Inquisition on Tacarigua, led by Commandant Sebastiano, and the crew of the pirate captain Morgan. Morgan proves to be a ruthless raider, and Sebastiano has issued a death warrant on all Mages after losing his mind combating the Shadows, and the Hero has no choice but to kill both leaders in order to secure the loyalty of their crews. The player can also acquire several NPC's to serve his crew and follow him, including the Guardian Horas, the Demon Hunter Edward, the pirate marksman Saddec, the gnome thief Jaffar, and the ghost of the late Inquisitor Mendoza, an antagonist from the first Risen. The loyalty of these characters is swayed by the Hero's actions that corrupt or restore his soul – a negative soul value drives many of them to abandon their loyalty, while it encourages Mendoza to help the Hero make contact with spirits in the Underworld to provide their assistance. The Hero frequently experiences dreams while sleeping, which in reality turn out to be memories from his spirit's travels in the Underworld, meeting with several deceased characters, including the Titan Lords Mara and Ursegor, his father Steelbeard, and several previous antagonists.

The druid Eldric on the Iron Bay reveals to the Hero what he knows of ancient magic that may help restore his soul. The Hero retrieves the Nekroimortar spell, which Eldric studies, and informs the Hero that they require the assistance of Chani and Zacharias, the only sorcerers he's confident are powerful enough to control the spell. They also require a secure location protected by magic to ensure the spell is not interrupted, and this sanctuary is provided by a powerful ancient being named Morgoloth, worshiped by the natives on Kila. With the preparations complete, the sorcerers attempt to restore the Hero's soul with the Nekroimortar spell. However, it turns out the spell is a ruse, and instead summons Nekroloth, the Titan Lord of Death, who absconds with the sorcerers to exploit their power. He leaves the Hero behind, unable to fight him in his present form, but also confident that he will not be able to hold out much longer without his soul.

Returning to his ship, the Hero learns that Nekroloth's plot was set in motion by the guardian Horas, who had been a part of his crew. Horas had learned of Eldric's intention to restore the Hero's soul, and used the opportunity to plant the false spell where the Hero would be looking. Horas fled back to the isle of Taranis, and uses the magical reactor of the Mages to summon a Titan made of crystals and magical ore, which the Hero is able to subdue and banish back through the portal. Horas tries to kill the Hero personally, but fails and is killed.

Still deprived of his soul, the Hero has no choice but to lead the assault on the Shadows' base on Skull Island. Along the way, they encounter the demon fleet led by Crow, and the Hero manages to defeat the ghost captain and vanquish the demon fleet. After establishing a beachhead on Skull Island, the human forces set about trying to capture strategic locations around the island. However, the Shadows prove difficult to uproot, and the Hero must aid several of them in securing their posts. In the center of the island, a fortress made of rocky spires is guarded by none other than the Hero's own spirit, who reveals he is bound by Nekroloth to destroy his own body if the Hero tries to enter the fortress, effectively committing suicide to stop the Hero. The three sorcerers are being guarded at three different locations, and their power is being sapped to help Nekroloth perform his spells, and by releasing them, the Hero can weaken Nekroloth enough to free his soul from its servitude.

The Hero is finally able to enter and engage the Titan Lord, who emerges in his true form, and uses his power to once again separate the Hero's spirit from his body. Nekroloth snatches the Hero's body away, consuming its life force while the Hero's spirit must combat the minions and attack the Titan Lord himself. After an arduous battle, the Hero is finally able to weaken Nekroloth enough to re-enter his own body, and strike the blow that sends Nekroloth back through the crystal portals and destroy them.

The ending cinematic plays out slightly differently depending on the Hero's soul value at the end of the game. If his soul value is more pure, he returns to the camp on the beach, where his companions await him eagerly, and his sister Patty comes to embrace him. If the Hero's soul is more demonic, the cinematic shows the remainder of his crew tentatively watching him approach. As he nears them, he turns and faces away from them with a demonic gleam in his eyes, showing that his soul has become irreparably corrupt.

== Development ==
Before Risen 3: Titan Lords's official announcement, rumors persisted that the third installment in the Risen series was to be called Risen 3: Blazing Oceans. This was supposedly based on a Facebook post by the German multimedia firm Dluxe Media that stated it had scored a contract which involved the creation of the soundtrack for Risen 3: Blazing Oceans.

== Reception ==
Reception

Aggregate score
Aggregator	Score
Metacritic	PC: 65/100; PS3: 36/100; X360: 44/100; PS4: 51/100

Review scores
Publication	Score
Game Informer	7/10
GameSpot	7/10
GamesRadar+	3.5/5
Hardcore Gamer	2.5/5
IGN	5.2/10
PC Gamer (US)	83/100
The Escapist	2/5

Risen 3: Titan Lords received mixed reviews. The large scale of the world, variety of enemies, and varied environments was praised as well as various minor tweaks to gameplay, but the game was panned for its lack of significant improvement over its predecessor.

Hooked Gamers stated: "Risen 3: Titan Lords oozes atmosphere and serves as a reminder that this type of roleplaying game is absolutely timeless. All you need is great gameplay, a decent storyline and a rich, varied open world in which every time you turn in a new direction a new adventure awaits. The time-devouring Risen 3 is as much about the player looking to claim back a lost soul as it is about Piranha Bytes finding theirs." PC Gamer said: "Combat quibbles and muddy graphics do little to spoil the fun of this enjoyable RPG."
