= Risen 2: Dark Waters =

2012 video game

- Developers: Piranha Bytes (Win); Wizarbox (PS3 & X360)
- Publishers: WW: Deep Silver; JP: Ubisoft
- Series: Risen
- Engine: Genome with NaturalMotions Morpheme
- Platforms: Microsoft Windows; PlayStation 3; Xbox 360
- Release: Microsoft Windows: NA: 24 April 2012 (Retail); NA: 26 April 2012 (Steam); EU: 27 April 2012; PlayStation 3 & Xbox 360: NA: 31 July 2012; EU: 3 August 2012; AU: 9 August 2012; JP: 28 February 2013
- Genre: Action role-playing
- Mode: Single-player

Risen 2: Dark Waters is a 2012 action role-playing game developed by Piranha Bytes and published by Deep Silver. It is the sequel to Risen and the second installment in the Risen series. It is a pirate themed game set in a fantasy world where monsters, ancient gods, and voodoo magic exist.

The game was released for Microsoft Windows in late April 2012 and for PlayStation 3 and Xbox 360 in late summer of 2012. The PC version was directly developed by Piranha Bytes, while French developer Wizarbox developed the console versions for PlayStation 3 and the Xbox 360.

Risen 2: Dark Waters received mixed reviews from critics. A sequel, Risen 3: Titan Lords, was released in 2014.

== Gameplay ==
Risen 2 is an action role-playing game where players take control of the main character in a third-person perspective to explore the in-game world, complete quests, and customize their character's abilities. While the physical appearance of the player character cannot be changed, other characteristics, including clothing and skill sets, can.

Throughout the game's progression, players can improve five key attributes, each with a focus on different styles of gameplay. The "Blades" attribute determines proficiency and use of swords, daggers, throwing weapons, and other slashing/thrusting weaponry while "Firearms" revolves on pistols, rifles and other gunpowder-based weaponry. "Toughness" determines the level of which damage that can be taken from different attacks, while "Cunning" focuses on stealth, including sneaking, thievery, and persuading other characters. The "Voodoo" attribute revolves around the use of black magic and other lethal and non-lethal rituals that can be utilized throughout the play. Each point covers many multiple sub-classes for each, known as "Talents", which are skills that represent different perks and abilities. Because of the variety, players can choose to focus on other attributes and talents depending on their approaches to gameplay, such as stealth, magic, dirty tricks, or conventional combat.

Gold is accumulated through progression and selling items to vendors that can be found worldwide. In addition to buying items, Vendors can also sell items to the player.

=== Abilities ===
Attributes and their respective Talents are leveled up by spending "Glory". The player gains glory by completing quests, discovering new locations, and defeating enemies. Individual Talents can also be leveled up through the use of certain items, which give either permanent or temporary boosts. Different interchangeable items of clothing and jewelry also give their own Talent improvements and levels of defense. Other skills can also be learned by receiving lessons and advice from skill-specific trainer characters throughout the game world. Still, each talent requires a certain level attribute to be met and an in-game gold fee. Trainer skills include useful abilities such as kicking over opponents and training monkeys and parrots to steal and distract foes, along with alchemy, gunsmithing, and forging that allows the players to create talents boosting potions and new weapons made from materials found or bought throughout the game. Other abilities include using a voodoo doll to take direct control of different characters or rituals to weaken opponents.

=== Combat ===
In combat, the player character has two weapon slots which can be switched through using a set of hot keys. In the right hand, the player wields a bladed weapon such as a cutlass or a two-handed rifle, while in the left hand is a secondary item such as a pistol or non-damaging items like sand to blind opponents or trained wildlife. Some items require aiming with both hands. When around most non-hostile characters, the player must not draw their weapons unless they flee or act aggressively. Players can also travel with an AI-controlled companion that will aid in combat and questing, some of which have their unique abilities that can benefit the player's character.

== Synopsis ==
=== Setting ===
The game is set in a fictional, fantasy-orientated region of its in-game world based on the Caribbean tropics. The world is divided into multiple locations across a fictional world map of islands or coastal areas home to jungles, caves, tribal villages, and outposts. Travel between islands is done with the player's pirate ship. Each location can only be accessed for the first time through a progression of the main story quest yet can be optionally revisited after. While certain routes and paths may be divided by mountainous or watery passes or story-scripted events, the location allows the player to take multiple routes and discover new and hidden sites or locales. The player must travel on foot through most of the location but can obtain a map of it that shows a complete overview of the island, including marked points related to current quests and discovered points of interest, such as villages, outposts, docks, and other safe non-hostile areas. Once these have been found and marked on the map, the player can then fast-travel between them without having to go on foot manually.

The game has a day and night cycle in which non-player characters and certain quests operate. Players can choose to sleep if they find an empty bed to skip to different times of the day.

=== Plot ===
The story begins in the Crystal Fortress at the port of Caldera, the last fortress of the Inquisition (a military/religious group last seen in Risen) and of the Old Empire. The mountains surrounding Caldera are aflame, as ancient gods called Titans assail the land to the north. Two Titan Lords, Ursegor (also last seen in the first game) and Ismael, have fallen to fighting each other, which has relieved the pressure on Caldera, although parts of the city are on fire and have been abandoned. One of the two Titan Lords will soon fall, and the winner will then try to find a way to crush Caldera. Only the power of the mysterious crystal cave under the Fortress gives the small, depleted garrison some hope to keep the victorious Titan Lord at bay. Attacks from a sea monster called the Kraken, under the command of the Titan goddess Mara, prevent Inquisition equipment, soldiers and supplies from reaching the last remaining haven of Caldera. The monster also prevents the Inquisition from fleeing from the Titans and the Old World, over the ocean to the New World. To add to the garrison's troubles, pirates who try to rob the storehouses threaten what little supplies Caldera has left.

One stormy night, Commandante Carlos (head of the Harbour Town garrison in the first Risen) spies a pirate ship on a course into Caldera harbor. Before it can reach safety, it is sunk by the Kraken. Carlos asks the hero to help any survivors. Among the survivors who are washed up on the beach is a key character from Risen, the pirate Patty. Patty is always searching for her father, the famous pirate Gregorius Emanuel Steelbeard, and his treasure. Rumor says Steelbeard has found a way to sail the seas safely, using what may be a possible weapon that could kill the Kraken. Commandante Carlos decides that the Hero should infiltrate Steelbeard's pirates and try to learn their secrets. Patty and the Hero decide to team up, for the journey to the pirate's island of Tacarigua. The Hero is officially stripped of his position in the Inquisition to ensure he will be accepted by the pirates and sent on his mission.

The hero and Patty find Steelbeard on the island's far side and discover that he has discovered the location of the Titan Harpoon, which could potentially kill even the Titan Lords themselves. The trio set sail and headed to the Sword Coast to confront the Harpoon's current owner, Captain Crow. However, Crow is safely protected from attacks by his crew and several loyal natives, leading the hero to side with either the Inquisition or the native Moluccas for assistance. When confronted, Crow summons an Earth Titan to kill the hero, only for him to steal the Harpoon and impale Crow with it.

The Harpoon acquired, Steelbeard reveals that three other Titan artifacts must be used in conjunction with the Harpoon to kill the Titan Lord Mara, the Kraken's master. Mara sends the Kraken to the Sword Coast and sinks Steelbeard's ship, killing Steelbeard himself. The hero is then tasked with obtaining the three artifacts from their owners to kill Mara.

To leave the island, the hero and Patty need to acquire a ship, and the only one available is the Inquisition ship under guard by Commandante Sebastiano. However, Sebastiano is under orders to confiscate the Titan Harpoon and will not aid the hero. With Patty and an ally from the player's chosen faction, they hatch a plan to steal away with the ship and travel to seek the weapons.

The hero and patty then travel to Antigua to see pirate captain Slayne to acquire his artifact, the sacrificial knife, in the fight against Mara. But Admiral Alvarez put the whole place under a trade embargo. After helping Slayne to equip the ship with supplies, the hero and Slayne travel to an island called Isle of Thieves where Slayne betrays the hero after acquiring the sacrificial knife and leaves him there.

By the time the hero exited that cave, Slayne had escaped the island. With no ship the hero explores the island and meets The gnome Jaffar who helps him out on the isle. They travel back to Antigua and challenge Slayne to a duel killing him and acquiring his artifact.

The hero then travels to Caldera to find the pirate captain Garcia to acquire his artifact. They found out he had traveled to the island of Maraccai bay. He found out the inquisition lead an expedition there, and they haven't returned. The hero explores the island to find Commandant Corrientes's expedition in Maraccai village, who tasks him with finding the secret entrance to the fire temple. Through a series of quests, the hero finds he was the pirate captain Garcia masquerading as Corrientes; then kills him and acquires his artifact from the fire temple.

Then the hero travels to the Isle of Dead to ask captain steelbeard's ghost about his share of artifact and found it's in Antigua. The hero acquires the earth Amulet and found the location of Water temple where Mara resides: from Steelbeard's ghost. The hero then travels to the water temple. Along the way Mara intercepts in the form of A giant Kraken. The hero defeats the kraken and a crew reaches the water temple. While the crew defeats Mara's minions, the hero enters the temple and kills Mara; freeing the world from her grip. Then the hero and his crew leave the Water temple after the game ends.

== Development ==
Following the success of Risen, the game was officially announced by Deep Silver on 18 August 2010 during a press conference at the GamesCom exhibition in Cologne, Germany. The official site was opened on 10 August 2011. The official name, Risen 2: Dark Waters, was announced on 19 February 2011.

Following numerous criticisms of the poor quality of Risen's console port, the publisher decided that the sequel would be jointly developed on PC and consoles from the project's inception, with experts from Piranha Bytes preparing elements for Wizarbox and with test controls every 30 or 60 days.

In late July 2011, Deep Silver announced that they had selected Steamworks as the form of digital rights management for the PC version of the game. This allowed users to add their retail keys to a Steam account and play the game via the service and included unlimited installs on any PC and no requirement to have the DVD in the drive to play.

In 2012, the ESRB announced that the original cover art of Risen 2: Dark Waters was unsuitable for release in North America, and Deep Silver was told to change it. Instead of a spray of red blood in the backdrop behind the skull, it was changed to blue. The cover art remained unchanged in other territories.

=== Downloadable content ===
Three DLCs titled "A Pirate's Clothes", "Air Temple" and "Treasure Isle" were released under the Gold Edition of the game.

== Reception ==
Reception

Aggregate score
Aggregator	Score
Metacritic	PC: 69/100; PS3: 47/100; X360: 60/100

Review scores
Publication	Score
Destructoid	7/10
Eurogamer	6/10 (UK); 8/10 (Germany)
G4	3/5
GameSpot	7/10
GameTrailers	6.7/10
IGN	6.5/10

Risen 2: Dark Waters received mixed reviews. The PC version has a score of 69/100, the Xbox 360 version 60/100, and the PlayStation 3 version 47/100 on the review aggregation website Metacritic.

GameSpot praised the pirate theme, noting atmosphere and non-cliché humor, jokingly concluding that Risen 2 "[offers] up a joyous and occasionally profane odyssey through humid jungles, dank caves, and imposing temples. It also lets you make monkeys fight each other, and that's a mechanic any RPG lover can get behind." However, they were less than impressed by the frustrating combat scenarios, annoying bugs that interfere with the player's journey, and with the game not being as free form as the original.

Destructoid applauded the depth, but criticized the combat and difficulty, stating that it "could have been a thoroughly supreme game, one that could have gone toe to toe with the heavyweights of action role-playing. Due to a number of highly questionable design decisions, however, a lot of that potential has withered away."

IGN gave the PC version a 6.5/10, calling it "a role-playing experience that uses convention as a crutch and marginalizes or strips away a lot of elements that made the studio's past games stand out."

Polygon gave the game a 7. They criticized the ship-sailing, stating "Though you get across its semi open world via sea, you'll never be in direct control of a ship."

== Sequel ==
Risen 3: Titan Lords was officially revealed on the cover of the German PC Games magazine and was released in 2014.
