= Arcania: Fall of Setarrif =

2011 video game

- Developer: Spellbound Entertainment
- Publisher: Nordic Games (Note: Published under the JoWooD brand name)
- Director: Jean-Marc Haessig
- Producer: Daniel Miller
- Designer: André Beccu
- Programmers: Johannes Conradie, Daniel Miller
- Artists: Jean-Marc Haessig, Eric Urocki
- Writers: Hans-Jörg Knabel, Dietrich Limper, David Sallmann
- Composer: Dynamedion
- Series: Gothic
- Engine: Vision
- Platforms: Microsoft Windows, Xbox 360, PlayStation 3, PlayStation 4
- Release: Microsoft Windows; 25 October 2011 PlayStation 3 & Xbox 360; 31 May 2013 PlayStation 4; 12 May 2015
- Genre: Role-playing video game
- Mode: Single-player

Arcania: Fall of Setarrif is an action role-playing video game and the standalone expansion for Arcania: Gothic 4. It was released on 25 October 2011 after a long period of silence from both publishers and after being delayed indefinitely in March 2011.

It was announced by Spellbound Entertainment and JoWooD on 9 December 2010.

== Plot ==
Arcania: Fall of Setarrif ties up the loose ends of the main game's story and adds yet another chapter to the epic tale. After the demon that possessed King Rhobar III was exorcised, it made its way to Setarrif to find a new host. In Setarrif, which is cut off from the rest of the island, chaos and anarchy spread rapidly.

King Rhobar III is troubled by these facts and is afraid of losing the city and some of his companions, which are in Setarrif at that very moment. The nameless hero therefore is sent by the king and must journey to Setarrif but he has no idea of what lies before him.

== Development ==
The development of the addon started around mid 2010, although it was planned earlier in the development of Arcania: Gothic 4. With the financial problems of the publisher at the time, no other details were revealed regarding the development of the game. JoWooD's community manager announced on one of the fansites that the debut trailer would be available in March 2011.

On 3 March 2011, JoWooD released the official website and first trailer for the add-on.

On 22 March 2011, JoWooD announced that the expansion had been delayed indefinitely because of legal issues with BVT Games Fund III.

However, on 21 September 2011, new publisher Nordic Games announced that the add-on would be available on 25 October 2011 for Microsoft Windows.
