= Gothic 3: Forsaken Gods =

- European cover art
- Developer: Trine Games (Note: Additional content developed by Mad Vulture Games)
- Publisher: JoWooD Productions
- Designer: Milind Kaduskar
- Series: Gothic
- Engine: Genome Engine
- Platform: Windows
- Release: NA: 18 November 2008; EU: 5 December 2008
- Genre: Action role-playing
- Mode: Single-player

Gothic 3: Forsaken Gods (German: Gothic 3: Götterdämmerung) is a standalone expansion for the action role-playing video game Gothic 3. It was developed by Trine Games and published by JoWooD Productions in 2008. An enhanced edition containing improvements was released in 2011, developed by Mad Vulture Games.

== Gameplay ==
Gameplay in Forsaken Gods is like in Gothic 3, with some small differences. The gameplay area in Forsaken Gods has been restrained from the three parts in Gothic 3 to just one part – Myrtana. The main plot is concentrated only in this area.

== Plot ==
After awakening from a coma, the nameless hero must find a way to unite the continent, as it has been divided by numerous factions, many of which are aided or led by the Nameless Hero's former companions. Through his own means, the Hero must reunite Myrtana as to finally restore the land to peace and prosperity.

== Updates ==
In November 2010, JoWooD announced that Mad Vulture Games would work on additional improvements for the game. The first patch was announced for Q1 2011. On 22 March 2011, JoWooD released the new patch via Steam, integrated within the new boxed version for the game titled Gothic 3: Forsaken Gods Enhanced Edition. It is also available as a free download.

The final version, 2.01.08, was officially released through the Mad Vulture Games website on 18 December 2011 and made available for free download similarly to the previous versions.

== Reception ==
Reception

Aggregate score
Aggregator	Score
Metacritic	44/100

Review scores
Publication	Score
1Up.com	D−
IGN	3.5/10

Gothic 3: Forsaken Gods received "generally unfavorable reviews" according to the review aggregation website Metacritic. It was largely the result of excessive bugs in release which to date has not been entirely resolved by patching.
