= Piranha Bytes =

German video game developer

Piranha Bytes GmbH
- Formerly: Piranha Bytes Software GmbH (1997–2002); Pluto 13 GmbH (2002–2019)
- Company type: Subsidiary
- Industry: Video games
- Founded: 1997 in Bochum, Germany
- Founders: Alex Brüggemann; Michael Hoge; Stefan Nyul; Tom Putzki
- Defunct: June 30, 2024
- Headquarters: Essen, Germany
- Key people: Michael Rüve (managing director)
- Products: Gothic series; Risen series; ELEX series
- Number of employees: 33 (2021)
- Parent: Phenomedia (1999–2002); THQ Nordic (2019–2024)
- Website: piranha-bytes.com

Piranha Bytes GmbH was a German video game developer based in Essen. It was best known for its Gothic and Risen series of role-playing video games.

Piranha Bytes was founded in Bochum in 1997 and bought by Phenomedia in 1999. When Phenomedia filed for insolvency in May 2002, the Piranha Bytes management bought out the studio. THQ Nordic, as part of Embracer Group, then acquired the company in May 2019.

Piranha Bytes was reported to be in the process of closing since December 2023. It was closed sometime in June 2024 due to Embracer Group failing to find a new owner for the company, according to a former employee; the company declined to make a public statement on its closure.

== History ==
Alex Brüggemann, Mike Hoge, Stefan Nyul and Tom Putzki founded Piranha Bytes in Bochum in 1997, incorporating it as Piranha Bytes Software GmbH. In 1999, the company became a wholly owned subsidiary of the German publisher Phenomedia. Piranha Bytes' first game, Gothic, was released in 2001. Shortly thereafter, Brüggemann left the company to work on smaller game projects, eventually designing The Settlers: Rise of an Empire. He died on 19 January 2013 after suffering from cancer for three years.

Following a financial scandal at Phenomedia, the parent company filed for insolvency in May 2002. Piranha Bytes' management performed a management buyout, concluded in September that year, and transferred the studio's trademarks and intellectual property, including the rights to the Gothic series, to Pluto 13 GmbH, a new entity that assumed "Piranha Bytes" as its trading name. Only one of the four original founders remained with the new incorporation. In March 2004, Piranha Bytes was among the founders of GAME Bundesverband der deutschen Games-Branche.

On 22 May 2019, THQ Nordic, as part of Embracer Group, announced that it had acquired the studio to undisclosed terms. At the time, Piranha Bytes had 31 employees in its Essen offices. Through the acquisition, the company was reincorporated as Piranha Bytes GmbH. By April 2021, with 33 employees, Piranha Bytes was among the forty largest video game companies in Germany.

In 2023, Embracer Group began implementing cost reduction measures to reduce accrued debt, including significant layoffs and studio closures. THQ Nordic reportedly began seeking a buyer for Piranha Bytes late that year. As this was unsuccessful, it began laying off all staff in December, a process ongoing as of 17 January 2024, and reduced the company to a shell. The state of the studio's third ELEX game (codenamed WIKI6) is unknown. The Federal Ministry for Economic Affairs and Climate Action, which financed the development with €3.2 million, briefly removed WIKI6 from its website before reinstating it as Currywurst, stating that the financing claim had not been withdrawn, unlike that of the project cancelled at the downsized sister studio Fishlabs.

=== Closure ===
On 22 January 2024, the studio released a message on its official website, which expressed optimism about finding a partner for future projects and promised to keep the community updated. In July 2024, it was confirmed that the studio had shut down in late June after failing to find such a partner.

Some of the former employees founded the independent studio Pithead, which is being led by husband and wife Björn and Jenny Pankratz, who have been part of Piranha Bytes more or less since its inception. They have not yet announced what project this small team will work on.

On 10 March 2025, four former Piranha Bytes employees announced the formation of Brainlag Games, a new independent studio. Their first game, Rootbound, is scheduled to be released in 2026.

== Games ==
| Year | Title | Platform(s) |
|---|---|---|
| 2001 | Gothic | Nintendo Switch, Windows |
| 2002 | Gothic II | Nintendo Switch, Windows |
| 2003 | Gothic II: Night of the Raven | Nintendo Switch, Windows |
| 2006 | Gothic 3 | Windows |
| 2009 | Risen | Nintendo Switch, PlayStation 4, Windows, Xbox 360, Xbox One |
| 2012 | Risen 2: Dark Waters | PlayStation 3, Windows, Xbox 360 |
| 2014 | Risen 3: Titan Lords | PlayStation 3, PlayStation 4, Windows, Xbox 360 |
| 2017 | ELEX | PlayStation 4, Windows, Xbox One |
| 2022 | ELEX II | macOS, PlayStation 4, PlayStation 5, Windows, Xbox One, Xbox Series X/S |
