= ELEX =

2017 video game

- Developer: Piranha Bytes
- Publisher: THQ Nordic
- Programmer: Philipp Krause
- Artist: Alexander Ockelmann
- Composer: Björn Pankratz
- Engine: Genome
- Platforms: Microsoft Windows; PlayStation 4 Xbox One
- Release: 17 October 2017
- Genre: Action role-playing
- Mode: Single-player

ELEX (Eclectic, Lavish, Exhilarating, Xenial) is a science fantasy-themed action role-playing video game developed by Piranha Bytes and published by THQ Nordic. It was released worldwide on 17 October 2017, for PlayStation 4, Xbox One and Windows. The game has been described as an "edgy, dark, uncompromising, and complex" post-apocalyptic sci-fi role-playing game where the protagonist joins the war for the powerful resource, "ELEX", which gives people magic-like powers. The game world is a mix of futuristic and medieval locations, in which the player can use guns, swords and magic against enemies.

== Setting ==
ELEX is the post-apocalyptic story of the planet Magalan, which was hit by a comet which brought not only mass destruction for its civilization, but also a mysterious and extremely powerful resource called Elex. The few survivors organised themselves in factions, each with a different vision of the future and distinct ways of using Elex.

The Berserkers reject technology and purify the Elex by transforming it into Mana in order to obtain magical but natural powers; they do this by growing World Hearts, large terraforming plants that they believe heal the ground and thus the planet. The Outlaws only want profit and freedom. They use any modern weapons and technology they can find, being masters of putting to use any old scrap; they use Elex to create powerful drugs. The Clerics believe in a god called Calaan, are the most knowledgeable and technologically advanced of the three main factions, and believe that their religion can save the world.

These factions – the Free People – fight each other over resources, land, and Elex, but they all share a common enemy: the Albs. The Albs are ex-Clerics who decided they should use Elex by consuming it directly into their bodies, making them very strong at the cost of their emotions and skin pigmentation. They use the most advanced technology of Magalan and work blindly under the command of the Hybrid, an ancient being that wants to gather all the Elex of the planet to achieve a new state of evolution for the Albs.

== Plot ==
Jax, the protagonist, is an Alb Commander on a special mission. His aircraft is shot down by an unknown enemy and then crashes over a mountain. He is knocked out for days, in which time most of the Elex clears out of his body, leaving him weak and alone in an unknown location and with a now-free mind. He tries to find out what happened to him and who attacked him. In doing so, he gets involved in the larger problems troubling the inhabitants of Magalan. A key mechanic is whether the player decides to be a cold person (logical and practical) who keeps his Alb personality and goals, or more emotional, by showing passion and helping the Free People for more ideological and altruistic reasons.

In exploring the world, Jax discovers through audio logs and old documents that the pre-impact government had predicted the comet's impact and secretly commissioned a project called Operation Calaan. This project, under the leadership of a Dr. Dawkins, sought to prevent extinction by taking a select number of people into space on a rocket nicknamed "Calaan". The rocket since became mythologized as a deity by the Clerics, who are unaware of its true nature. The operation failed due to mismanagement and general panic, and the rocket never launched.

After gaining allies, resolving inter-faction conflicts and beating back the Alb invasion, Jax finally confronts the Hybrid. He discovers that the Hybrid is actually the former Dr. Dawkins. He had sealed himself in a protective chamber and survived the blast itself, but was affected by the Elex. A mysterious and highly advanced alien species spoke to him through the Elex and told him to prepare the world for their arrival. He and his chosen Albs thus sought to find and consume all Elex at all costs so that they may "evolve" and be allowed to survive.

Eventually Jax manages to defeat the Hybrid. Before doing so however, the Hybrid is able to send an unknown signal into space. A strange, large shape appears in the sky as Jax resolves to prepare the world for the arrival of the aliens.

== Gameplay ==
ELEX is an action role-playing game set in a post-apocalyptic open world environment and played from a third-person perspective. The player can use both swords and firearms, with magic becoming available later. The game includes mutated creatures as one of the enemy types, and has an interconnected quest system that supports player choices. The player may join up with one of three factions – the Berserkers who use Elex for magical purposes, the Clerics who use the substance to power their machines, or the Outlaws who embrace an "everyone for themselves" philosophy.

== Development ==
ELEX was announced during Gamescom 2015, where Piranha Bytes and Nordic Games confirmed their partnership on the project. It was featured as a cover story in the German magazine GameStar. The game was developed using Piranha Bytes' proprietary Genome game engine.

== Reception ==
Reception

Aggregate score
Aggregator	Score
Metacritic	PC: 67/100; PS4: 58/100; XONE: 62/100

Review scores
Publication	Score
GameSpot	7.3/10
IGN	4.9/10

ELEX received "mixed or average" reviews from critics, according to Metacritic.

== Sequel ==
In June 2021, THQ Nordic and Piranha Bytes announced ELEX 2, a direct sequel to the first game. It was released in March 2022 for PlayStation 4, PlayStation 5, Xbox One, Xbox Series X/S and Windows.
