= Gothic 3 =

2006 video game

- Developer: Piranha Bytes
- Publishers: Microsoft Windows: EU: JoWooD Productions; EU: Deep Silver; AU: Auran; NA: Aspyr Media; Nintendo Switch 2, PlayStation 4 & 5, Xbox One, Xbox Series: WW: THQ Nordic
- Composer: Kai Rosenkranz
- Series: Gothic
- Engine: Genome
- Platform: Microsoft Windows
- Release: Microsoft Windows: EU: 13 October 2006; AU: 14 November 2006; NA: 14 November 2006; PlayStation 4 & 5, Xbox One & Xbox Series, Nintendo Switch 2: WW: November 24, 2026
- Genre: Action role-playing
- Mode: Single-player

Gothic 3 is a 2006 action role-playing game for Windows developed by Piranha Bytes. It is the sequel to Gothic II and the third game in the Gothic franchise. Players control the Nameless Hero, who sails to a new continent overrun with orcs who have enslaved the human kingdom.

It received mixed reviews from critics for its unfinished state at launch. After Piranha Bytes and publisher JoWooD parted ways, bug fixes continued through community patches. JoWooD released a standalone expansion, titled Gothic 3: Forsaken Gods, in November 2008.

Ports of Gothic 3 for PlayStation 4, PlayStation 5, Xbox One, Xbox Series X/S and Nintendo Switch 2 are scheduled to be released in November 2026, under the title Gothic 3 Classic.

== Gameplay ==
The player must complete quests and slay wild animals and monsters to earn experience and improve skills. The game is reputation centric allowing the player to side with a faction. While there are six factions in the game, only three are joinable: the Rebels, the Orc mercenaries and the Hashishin. The remaining factions are the Rangers, the Nomads and the people of Nordmar. The player is able to take advantage of missions to allow either side to take over towns. Dialog changes according to in-game actions and behavior. The game places a special focus on the interactivity of the environment. The controls have been altered slightly with a stronger focus on action. Navigation and combat are more mouse-centric, with each mouse button having a different combat action. The Nameless Hero can also now wield dual weapons or use a shield.

== Synopsis ==
=== Prologue ===
The first part of Gothic tells the story of The Nameless Hero, a man thrust into the events of a penal colony. The colony takes the form of a natural landscape encased in a large magical shield known as The Barrier, much like an impenetrable dome. Over the course of the story, The Nameless Hero becomes acquainted with several characters, the most notable of which are Diego, Lee, Cor Angar, Lester, Gorn, Lares, Milten, and Xardas. Some of these characters are connected with the various factions of the game, which include the Old Camp, the New Camp and the Swamp Camp. Also connected with these factions are the water and fire mages, of which Xardas is an outcast. Xardas, a necromancer, plays a central part to the survival and advancement of the character. Ultimately, he galvanizes the character toward the ultimate goal of stopping the summoning of a beast known as The Sleeper, but the entrance was guarded by a camp of orcs. The hero was helped by an orc shaman named Ur-Shak, who made an artifact that would prevent the orcs from attacking him. The Nameless Hero banishes The Sleeper at the cost of nearly losing his own life.

The second part of Gothic sees The Nameless Hero resurrected by Xardas into a new setting. Now located outside the city of Khorinis, he is asked by Xardas to investigate a new evil that threatens Khorinis and the surrounding lands. Over the course of the story, The Nameless Hero reconnects with old friends from the first chapter while adjusting to changes in the faction structure. With the penal colony and its barrier a thing of the past, the surrounding lands have been invaded by orcs. Factions now consist of the Militia/Paladins of Khorinis, the Fire Novices/Fire Mages, and the Mercenaries/Dragon Hunters. Water mages also make a return. Having discovered the source of the evil threatening Khorinis, our hero assembles a crew of trusted friends and sails to a nearby island. There he battles a large undead dragon, completing the central quest of the chapter. The chapter closes with the hero and his allies sailing away from the island.

Gothic 2 also has an expansion called Night of the Raven. In the expansion, the Hero faced many new dangers and a new unexplored world. The Water Mages played an important role in the expansion. There was a new faction known as the Ring of Water, who had the same relationship to the Water Mages as the Paladins do to the Fire Mages. The main antagonist was Raven, who was second-in-command to Gomez, leader of the Old Camp, in the first game. Raven wanted to command the armies of Beliar, the evil one of the 3 gods, along with a new powerful weapon known as the Claw of Beliar.

=== Plot ===
The third part opens with the Nameless Hero and his friends sailing to a new continent overrun with orcs, arriving in Myrtana, the central region of the continent. The hero lost all his belongings from the previous game when his ship is stolen while he's onshore with Milten, Diego, Gorn, and Lester. Presumably this is the source of the orc invasion that was launched on Khorinis during the second chapter. These lands have no physical connection to Khorinis or the ruins of the penal colony. In these mountainous forests the orcs have enslaved the human kingdom with only a few free humans living in the nearly uninhabitable icy northlands of Nordmar and the southern desert of Varant. The hero must decide whether to join the rebellion and stay true to the deposed human king, serve the Orcish usurpers in their quest to topple the last remaining human stronghold, or choose a path that serves his own ends. Throughout the story, he is accompanied by a number of NPCs, some of whom are old friends. While this chapter brings forward friends from the previous title (Xardas, Diego, Milten, Gorn, Lester, Lee, and Vatras) it also introduces two new major characters; King Rhobar the Second (who ultimately was responsible for sending the Nameless Hero to the penal colony in the first game) and Zuben. While the king has a strong past as a bold leader, he now faces a near defeat; his fame is on the decline. Zuben leads the Hashishin that inhabit the southern region of Varant.

== Development ==
Gothic 3 is powered by a custom engine called Genome; it supports Pixel Shader 3.0, has a multithreaded design and includes dynamic lighting (including self-shadowing). Character animation uses EMotion FX 2 and physics simulation is provided by Ageia's PhysX physics engine. It also uses IDV's SpeedTreeRT tree and plant software, Bink Video Technology from RAD Game Tools for the cutscenes, as well as the FMOD Sound System from Firelight Technologies for sound playback.

=== Post-release ===
After a release with many problems and bugs, a dispute between the publisher and developer led to their separation in 2007. The game remained with the last released patch 1.12 in a buggy and unfinished state, and an announced further patch and editor were not finished.

The copyright holding publisher Jowood granted access to the source code to developers from the game community to allow the fans at least take care of the significant problems and bugs themselves. In years of voluntary and unpaid work the fan community produced several community patches, with an actual iteration version 1.75 released in April 2012. With this 1.5 GB-sized patch significant enhancements and fixes were introduced, so that finally a playable state of the game was achieved. Also, a "Community Story Project" still works on fixing inconsistencies in former Gothic games and on filling story gaps. In 2014 an additional patch and a data optimizer for the 1.75.14 version became available fixing some of the remaining issues.

== Reception ==
Reception

Aggregate score
Aggregator	Score
Metacritic	63/100

Review scores
Publication	Score
1Up.com	C
Eurogamer	8/10
Game Informer	5/10
GameRevolution	D
GameSpot	7.6/10
GameSpy	1.5/5
GameZone	7.7/10
IGN	4.9/10
PC Gamer (US)	80%
X-Play	3/5

Gothic 3 was a commercial success, with global sales over 500,000 copies by March 2007. It sold 100,000 units in its opening two days.

The game received "mixed" reviews, according to video game review aggregator Metacritic. Prior to its release in early October 2006, Gothic 3 was nominated as the best game of E3 by IGN. Since the release, most concerns have centered on bugs. Hyper's Daniel Wilks commended the game for its "ton of quests, reward[ing] exploration and approachable combat". However, he criticised it for "system hogging, feeling unfinished and atrocious voice acting".

Due to the test headline and the poor rating by German magazine PC PowerPlay (67%), JoWooD employees threatened and insulted the editorial staff even before the article was published. JoWooD also attempted to claim damages.

== Legacy ==
=== Gothic 3: The Beginning ===
A mobile game, Gothic 3: The Beginning, was produced by German developer Handy-Games GmbH and published by JoWooD. It takes place 140 years before the events in the first Gothic game, on the island of Khorinis. Xardas (one of the main characters from the original PC Gothic series), an orphan, raised by farmers, is visited one night by the ghost of Buthomar. The ghost tells the young Xardas about an unknown threat and asks him to find "the other four Chosen Ones".

Gothic 3: The Beginning was awarded up to seven awards. It received the Airgamer Award, from airgamer.de, while handy-player.de gave it the Handy-Player Award. Pocketgamer.co.uk gave it the Bronze Award. Other awards include the play2go gold award from play2go, the Silver Award from Mobile Games Faqs, a 90% award offered by looki.de, and the Next Award offered by projectnext.de.

=== Gothic 3: Forsaken Gods ===
In November 2008, JoWooD released a standalone expansion to Gothic 3, titled Gothic 3: Forsaken Gods, developed by Trine Games. Forsaken Gods was similarly buggy as the original game and was later fixed in an Enhanced Edition by Mad Vulture Games, a company which was created by developers from the game community.

=== Re-release ===
On August 1, 2025, THQ Nordic announced that Gothic 3 would be released as part of a trilogy on PlayStation and Xbox consoles in 2026. Ports are scheduled to be released in November 2026 for PlayStation 4, PlayStation 5, Xbox One, Xbox Series X/S and Nintendo Switch 2 under the title Gothic 3 Classic.
