= Gothic II =

2002 video game

- Cover inset painting by Michel Bohbot
- Developer: Piranha Bytes
- Publishers: Microsoft Windows: DE: JoWooD Productions; EU: Infogrames Europe; NA: Atari; Nintendo Switch, PlayStation 4 & 5, Xbox One, Xbox Series: WW: THQ Nordic
- Producers: Michael Hoge; Björn Pankratz; Michael Rüve
- Designers: Michael Hoge; Björn Pankratz; Stefan Kalveram
- Programmers: Carsten Edenfeld; Nico Bendlin
- Artist: Horst Dworczak
- Composer: Kai Rosenkranz
- Series: Gothic
- Engine: ZenGin
- Platforms: Microsoft Windows; Nintendo Switch
- Release: Microsoft Windows: DE: 29 November 2002; EU: 13 June 2003; NA: 28 October 2003; Nintendo Switch: WW: 29 November 2023; PlayStation 4 & 5, Xbox One & Xbox Series: WW: September 29, 2026
- Genre: Action role-playing
- Mode: Single-player

Gothic II is a 2002 action role-playing game developed by Piranha Bytes for Microsoft Windows, and the sequel to Gothic. It was released for Microsoft Windows in 2002 in Germany, in 2003 in the rest of Europe and North America. A port titled Gothic II Complete Classic (which includes the expansion Night of the Raven) was released in 2023 and 2026 for Nintendo Switch, PlayStation 4, PlayStation 5, Xbox One and Xbox Series X/S.

Like its predecessor, Gothic II was praised for its story, quest design, game world, music and sound, and NPC behaviour. Reviewers also noted its improved combat controls compared to its predecessor. Criticism focused on the game's dated graphics, technical and performance problems such as clipping issues and crashes, and, in the English-speaking press, the quality of its localization.

Gothic II was a commercial success in Germany and became publisher JoWood's biggest hit at the time of its release. By 2004 it had sold over 300,000 units when combined with its expansion pack, Night of the Raven, and by January 2005 it had sold around 500,000 units across Europe.

== Synopsis ==
=== Setting ===
Like Gothic, Gothic II is set on the medieval styled isle Khorinis. Places include the City of Khorinis, the monastery of the Fire Mages, farms and woods. The Mining Valley from the predecessor is also in the game, though it is a desolate wasteland now. Of the Old Camp only the castle ruins remain, the New Camp has turned into a region of unnatural frost, and the Swamp Camp is made inaccessible by a wall built by the orcs. The final place visited in the game is the Islet of Irdorath, which contains a dungeon similar to the Sleeper's temple in Gothic.

Khorinis is a rich area with beautiful farms and dense forests. The main trade resource of Khorinis is the magic ore delivered from its recently fallen prison colony to the King, who is fighting the orcs on the mainland. Most of the farms in Khorinis are owned by one landowner who has hired mercenaries - most of them former convicts from the Mining Valley - to protect him and his farms from the city militia when they try to collect taxes from the farms. This has caused Khorinis to be on the edge of a civil war. The city is low on basic necessities and relies on travelling merchants as the ships from the mainland have stopped coming because of the war.

People in Khorinis believe in three gods: Innos, the god of fire, sunlight and order; Beliar, the god of death, darkness and things unnatural; and Adanos, the god of water who is also the patron of humanity and maintains balance between Innos' and Beliar's influence over human world.

=== Prologue ===
After the magical barrier around the prison colony is destroyed, ore shipments from the island to the Kingdom cease. To secure new supplies of magic ore, the king sends Lord Hagen with a detachment of one hundred paladins to Khorinis. In the meantime, former prisoners who escaped the colony raid the countryside, and, as the local militia proves unable to protect the population, some farmers form an alliance with the refugees and refuse to acknowledge the king’s authority.

The banishment of the Sleeper does not end the threat: with its last cry the demonic being summons powerful creatures of darkness. Sensing this, the necromancer Xardas rescues the Nameless Hero from beneath the ruins of the Sleeper’s temple, where he has lain for weeks and grown weak.

=== Plot ===
The Nameless Hero is instructed by Xardas on the new danger, an army of evil that has gathered in the mine valley, led by dragons. Xardas sends the Hero to Lord Hagen, leader of the paladins, to retrieve the Eye of Innos, an artifact which makes it possible to speak with the dragons and learn more about their motivation.

The Nameless Hero starts to the City of Khorinis and after he found a way to enter the city, he learns he has to join one of the factions – the militia, the fire mages or the mercenaries – to be permitted entrance to Lord Hagen. When finally meeting the head of the paladins, the Nameless Hero is first sent into the mine valley, which is now overrun by Orcs, to bring back evidence of the dragons. In the castle, the former old camp, Garond heads the mission of the paladins. He also knows about the dragons, since the castle has already been attacked by them, but is only willing to write a notice on it for Lord Hagen, after the Nameless Hero has gathered information on the status in the mines. By the time the Hero exits the valley with the note about the dragons, the evil forces have become aware of his quest. Seekers are spread throughout the isle, with the goal to kill him.

Presented with the note Lord Hagen is willing to give the Eye of Innos to the Hero and sends him to the monastery of the fire mages to retrieve it. But shortly before the Hero arrives there, the eye was stolen. The Hero chases after the thief, but just arrives in time to witness Seekers destroy the Eye of Innos. A smith can repair the amulet, but for the magical power to be restored, a ritual with high mages representing the three gods is necessary. Vatras, the water mage, prepares the ritual and represents Adanos. With former fire mage Xardas representing Beliar, Pyrokar, head of the fire mages, joins the ritual reluctantly to represent Innos.

The mages manage to restore the power of the Eye of Innos and so the Hero can head back to the valley to destroy the four dragons that live there. After all of the dragons are killed, the Hero travels to Xardas' tower to report to him, but the mage is gone. The Hero is given a note from Xardas by Lester, telling him he was to find more information in the fire mages' monastery, in the book 'The Halls of Irdorath'.

The book contains a sea map, showing the way to the isle Irdorath, one of the ancient temples of Beliar that once disappeared. The hero assembles a crew and gets a ship and a captain for that ship to sail to Irdorath and confront the leader of the dragons, and avatar of Beliar – the undead dragon. After the hero slays the dragon, Xardas teleports into the cave and absorbs its soul, making him an avatar of Beliar. After the hero returns to the ship, Xardas appears and tells him that they will see each other again. The game ends with the ship sailing into the distance toward Myrtana.

== Development ==
The game engine is a modified version of the Gothic engine. The texture resolution was improved from the first game by a factor of four, and the world is three times as detailed. While the graphics are less detailed than other engines of the time, there is almost no loading time.

== Marketing and release ==
The German version of the game was published by JoWooD and released on 29 November 2002. On 1 May 2003, Infogrames announced they would market and distribute the title in all non-German territories. In the United Kingdom and Scandinavia, the game was released on 13 June 2003. The US release by Atari followed a few months later on 28 October. However, according to Piranha Bytes, Atari did not officially confirm the US release to them, so they did not spread the word about this release for months.

On 17 October 2005, publisher JoWood announced that Aspyr Media was going to publish four of their titles in North America, one of them being Gothic II Gold, which includes Gothic II as well as the expansion pack Gothic II – Night of the Raven. Aspyr Media released Gothic II Gold on 29 November 2005.

In Germany, Gothic II is also available in a Collector's Edition, together with the add-on and Gothic. An English demo version of the game which contains the first part was released on 17 March 2005, when the game was released in several new territories.

== Reception ==
=== Sales ===
Following high sales projections, Gothic II became a commercial success and was JoWood's largest-ever hit by early 2003. In the German market, it debuted at #1 on GfK's weekly computer game sales charts in December, topping popular rivals like Harry Potter and the Chamber of Secrets. Tobias Simon of Gameswelt noted that it shot "directly from zero to #1" upon release. After dropping to #3 in its second and third weeks, it finished the final calendar week of 2002 in second place, behind Anno 1503. German firm Media Control ultimately ranked Gothic II as the German market's second-biggest computer game seller of December, again behind Anno.

Gothic II continued to hold the second position on GfK's charts for the first two weeks of January 2003, before falling to places fifth, fourth and tenth over its following three weeks, respectively. Despite exiting the top 10 in the sixth week of 2003, Gothic II received a "Gold" award from the Association of Entertainment Software Germany (VUD) by the end of January, for sales of at least 100,000 units across Germany, Austria and Switzerland. The game retained sixth place on Media Control's monthly chart for February, and by June had spent seven consecutive months in the firm's top 30, claiming 15th that month. After two 17th-place finishes in July and August, it climbed back to 14th in September 2003.

By February 2004, Gothic II had sold 200,000 units, while its expansion pack had achieved 100,000 sales. In early 2005, Koch Media launched its "Hammerprice" line of budget games, which repackaged older titles at a €10 price point. Gothic II was among the first games released on the label, alongside titles such as SpellForce: The Order of Dawn and Singles: Flirt Up Your Life. Selling around 200,000 units in this new form, Gothic II became one of Koch's most successful Hammerprice games by 2007.

Throughout Europe, Gothic II sold 500,000 units by January 2005.

=== Critical reviews ===
Reception

Aggregate score
Aggregator	Score
Metacritic	79/100

Review scores
Publication	Score
Computer Games Magazine	4/5
Computer Gaming World	4/5
GameSpot	8.1/10
GameSpy	2/5
IGN	8/10
PC Format	80%
PC Gamer (UK)	62%
PC Gamer (US)	89%
PC Zone	80%
X-Play	4/5

Gothic II received very high reviews in the German press. Like its predecessor Gothic II was praised for its story, quests, game-world, music and sound and believable NPC-behavior. Reviewers also credited the game for its improved combat controls compared to its predecessor. Gothic II was criticized for its graphics and performance issues (Clipping errors and crashes). The game did not fare as well in North America, where the game received "generally favorable reviews" according to the review aggregation website Metacritic. The translation of the script and the voice acting in the English version were criticized, and were felt by critics to be out of place and poorer than in the German version. Much of the voice acting criticism falls upon the change in the voice for the character Diego.

Gothic II won PC Gamer US's 2003 "Best Roleplaying Game" award. The editors called it "a return to the roots of classic fantasy roleplaying on the PC" and noted its "beautifully detailed nonlinear 3D world". It was also nominated for RPG Vault's "RPG of the Year", "Outstanding Achievement in Music" and "Outstanding Achievement in Sound" awards, all of which went to Star Wars: Knights of the Old Republic.

== Mods ==
In 2021, the game received a stand-alone mod, The Chronicles of Myrtana, developed by the Polish team and released independently on Steam with permission from the Gothic II creators. The mod received over 100,000 downloads within few days of its release and won two awards from Mod DB, including its "Mod of the Year" award.

== Influence ==
According to CD Projekt, which localized and published the game in Poland, the first two Gothic games were a major source of inspiration in the development of The Witcher role playing series.
