= Dragon Storm =

Dragon Storm may refer to:

- Dragon Storm (game), a role-playing game and collectible card game
- Dragon Storm (astronomy), a giant thunderstorm on Saturn
- Dragon Storm (film), a Sci-Fi Channel original movie
- SpellForce 2: Dragon Storm, a role-playing and real-time strategy hybrid video game
