= Mass Effect 3: Leviathan =

- Developer: BioWare
- Publisher: Electronic Arts
- Composers: Cris Velasco; Sascha Dikiciyan
- Series: Mass Effect
- Engine: Unreal Engine 3
- Platforms: Microsoft Windows; PlayStation 3 Xbox 360
- Release: August 28, 2012; August 29, 2012 (EU PS3)
- Genres: Action role-playing, third-person shooter
- Mode: Single-player

Mass Effect 3: Leviathan is a downloadable content (DLC) pack developed by BioWare and published by Electronic Arts for the 2012 action role-playing video game Mass Effect 3. It was released for Microsoft Windows, PlayStation 3, and Xbox 360 on August 28, 2012, with a delayed release in Europe on the PS3 platform set for August 29, 2012. The pack follows Commander Shepard and the crew of the SSV Normandy SR-2 starship as they investigate the truth about the origins of the Reapers.

Leviathan is the third major downloadable content pack for Mass Effect 3, after From Ashes and Extended Cut. It received generally mixed reviews from critics, who praised the story and gameplay, but questioned the relevancy of the lore it added to the series' canon due to the controversy surrounding the ending of Mass Effect 3.

At the 2012 Spike Video Game Awards Leviathan was nominated for Best DLC (downloadable content), but ultimately lost to The Elder Scrolls V: Skyrim - Dawnguard.

== Plot ==
Shepard is summoned to the Citadel by Admiral Hackett to meet with Dr. Garrett Bryson, the head of Task Force Aurora, a group created to investigate ancient legends about the Reapers. Bryson has been pursuing rumors about of a mythical Reaper-killing creature called Leviathan. Bryson is killed by his assistant, Derek Hadley, who had been enthralled through an artifact stored in Bryson's lab. Hadley is telepathically rendered brain-dead afterwards, and Shepard and EDI seek answers from another task member, Dr. Garneau. They track him to a mining site on the planet Mahavid, where they find the workers enthralled by a similar artifact from Bryson's lab. Speaking through Garneau, Leviathan warns Shepard to leave it alone before destroying Garneau and the artifact.

Undeterred, Shepard and EDI return to Bryson's lab and obtain the location of Ann Bryson, Garrett's daughter, in another research site. The Reapers attack, but Shepard's crew manages to save Ann. After hearing of her father's death, Ann intentionally allows Leviathan to speak through her from the artifact in Bryson's lab, which may result in brain-damage depending on Shepard's actions. EDI traces Leviathan's signal to 2181 Desponia, an underwater planet. Delving into the depths, Shepard meets Leviathan, who reveals that before the cycles, its kind were the apex of life in the galaxy. After the lesser species created machines that then destroyed them, Leviathan created an intelligence to solve this problem. Upon finding a solution, the intelligence created the Reapers, which ended up wiping out most of Leviathan's species. Leviathan has since remained hidden and used the artifacts to observe the cycles. Shepard convinces Leviathan to come out of hiding, as it can no longer hide from the Reapers. Leviathan disables an arriving Reaper to enable Shepard's escape and vows to fight.

== Gameplay ==
During the final act of the pack, the player must pilot a mech unit to travel to the bottom of an ocean.

Mass Effect 3: Leviathan is a downloadable content (DLC) pack for the 2012 action role-playing video game Mass Effect 3. The player assumes the role of Commander Shepard, an elite human soldier who commands the SSV Normandy SR-2 starship. The DLC pack is set within the Milky Way galaxy in 2186, during the midst of a galaxy-wide invasion by a highly advanced machine race of synthetic-organic starships known as the Reapers, and prior to Shepard leading Earth's final stand. Shepard is directed by Admiral Hackett of the Systems Alliance to support the efforts of an Alliance researcher named Dr. Garret Bryson, who along with his daughter Dr. Ann Bryson have uncovered important new information about the mysterious history of the Reapers that could have a direct bearing on the war effort against the Reaper invasion.

The narrative for the DLC pack begins at a new area on the Citadel, Dr. Bryson's laboratory. To access the DLC content, the player must select "Dr. Bryson's Lab" upon their arrival to the Citadel hub location.

During the course of Leviathan's narrative, Shepard's crew piece together clues which eventually lead them to travel across uncharted systems in the galaxy to investigate rumors of a mysterious being known as the Leviathan of Dis, speculated to be powerful enough to destroy a Reaper outright. Leviathan also unlocks two new weapon types for the player, four achievements, as well as a new biotic power called "Dominate" which could be assigned to Shepard upon completion of the pack.

== Development and release ==
Leviathan was developed by BioWare and published by Electronic Arts. The Art of the Mass Effect Universe, a compilation of the original Mass Effect trilogy's art books published in February 2012 prior to the release of Mass Effect 3, explained that the Reapers' synthetic but organic feel informs their overarching design throughout the series; the implication is that the Reapers are thinking creatures which have adopted patterns of living, organic beings as part of their original construction. The entity known as the Leviathan of Dis was previously referenced in the first game and Mass Effect 3.

A partial script of the pack was leaked on or before June 27, 2012, by BioWare fans, who extracted the hidden data contained within the Mass Effect 3 Extended Cut DLC patch and uploaded it to Pastebin. The pack was officially announced on August 2, 2012. Leviathan was released worldwide between August 28, 2012, and August 29, 2012, for Microsoft Windows, PlayStation 3, and Xbox 360. The pack was not released for the Wii U version of Mass Effect 3.

== Reception ==
Reception

Aggregate score
Aggregator	Score
Metacritic	75/100 (PC); 74/100 (X360)

Review scores
Publication	Score
Eurogamer	7/10
GameRevolution	4/5
GameSpot	6/10
GameSpy	3.5/5
IGN	7.5/10
Official Xbox Magazine (UK)	7/10
Official Xbox Magazine (US)	8/10

According to the review aggregator Metacritic, the Microsoft Windows version received "generally favorable reviews" while the Xbox 360 version of Mass Effect 3: Citadel received mixed reviews from video game publications. Leviathan received mixed reviews from critics. GameSpot editor Kevin VanOrd called Leviathan a "plot-hole plugger", noting that while it solves one of the trilogy's "enduring enigmas which was left largely unexplained", its "meandering pace doesn't build enough tension for the payoff". He praised the pack for its combat sequences, its handling of "complex emotions with care, and benefits from sensitive voice acting that smartly avoids melodramatic sobs", as well as its "gorgeous and entrancing deep-sea vistas" which is contrasted with "the danger of an entire ocean threatening to squeeze you out of existence". Destin Legarie from IGN notes that Leviathan's narrative "will resonate more powerfully than for those who have finished the game". He was impressed by the addition of new story elements that didn't previously exist, noting the player will "feel creeped out, pick up some cool weapons and mods before you reach the stunning conclusion". VanOrd and Legarie both compared Leviathan unfavorably to prior Mass Effect add-ons, and concluded that Leviathan came up short when it comes to competently mixing storytelling with exciting combat.

Richard Cobbett, writing for Gamespy, described the narrative of Leviathan as the "Mass Effect equivalent of someone in World War II deciding to finally track down and weaponize Bigfoot". He opined that Leviathan is "easily one of the best bits of DLC that Bioware has ever put out - at least matching the quality of Lair of the Shadow Broker, and arguably surpassing it in many ways". He concluded that the core problem of the pack is that it was "created to answer questions that nobody was asking, after an ending that itself answered too many". Tom Phillips from Eurogamer called Leviathan "a rich adventure for those who are willing to reopen the door on Commander Shepard's story, and a worthwhile chapter of lore within the Mass Effect canon. But for those who have already moved on it is perhaps reassuring that, at the end of it all, those goalposts lie largely unmoved'. Jessica Vasquez from Game Revolution was pleased that Leviathan is not another multiplayer map pack; she noted that "diehard fans are going to love the story while more casual gamers might appreciate the perks and extras that come out of it, especially the Dominate bonus power", and the addition of Leviathan makes the overall story of Mass Effect 3 feel less rushed and incomplete.

Francesca Reyes' review published in the US edition of the Official Xbox Magazine noted that solving the central mystery of Leviathan "involves plenty of indoctrination talk, an unexpectedly affecting father-daughter relationship between two new characters, and perhaps a bit too much CSI-style sleuthing in a Citadel lab". She concluded that the pack provides "a slightly uneven but deeply worthwhile journey that adds intriguing lore to the series’ canon". The UK edition of the Official Xbox Magazine gave a slightly less favourable review, concluding that Leviathan was a "well-constructed creature chase, but not a compelling reason to return to active duty", and "an admirable piece of Mass Effect DLC, the best so far behind Lair of the Shadow Broker", which was undermined by the controversial ending sequence of Mass Effect 3.

At the 2012 Spike Video Game Awards, Leviathan was nominated for Best DLC (downloadable content), but lost to The Elder Scrolls V: Skyrim - Dawnguard.
