= SpellForce 3 =

2017 video game

- Developer: Grimlore Games
- Publisher: THQ Nordic
- Series: SpellForce
- Platforms: Microsoft Windows; PlayStation 4; PlayStation 5; Xbox One; Xbox Series X/S
- Release: Microsoft Windows; 7 December 2017; PS4, PS5, Xbox One, Xbox Series X/S; 7 June 2022
- Genres: Real-time strategy, role-playing
- Modes: Single-player, multiplayer

SpellForce 3 is a 2017 video game developed by Grimlore Games and published by THQ Nordic. It was released for Microsoft Windows on 7 December 2017. SpellForce 3 is the third full and the ninth overall release in the SpellForce video game series. It is the first entry in the series since 2014's SpellForce 2: Demons of the Past. The plot serves as a prequel to the first game (SpellForce: The Order of Dawn), depicting events that lead to the creation of The Circle, the group of mages whose actions were the basis for The Order of Dawn.

The game combines role-playing and real-time strategy elements like previous games in the series. Players control a mage called Tahar and a group of supporting characters with different backstories and abilities. Like many role-playing games, characters can equip various items such as armor, weapons and jewelry that influence the character's abilities and traits. Many maps allow players to construct buildings and gather resources to create additional units with fixed abilities. The game features an extensive campaign that can be played by a single player or two players. It also includes a skirmish mode allowing players to battle against the AI or other players, independently of the campaign.

Two standalone expansions were released for SpellForce 3, Soul Harvest (2018) and Fallen God (2020), as well as a free multiplayer-only version called SpellForce 3: Versus. On 6 December 2021, an upgraded version of the original, SpellForce 3 Reforced was released for Microsoft Windows, and was released for PlayStation 4, PlayStation 5, Xbox One and Xbox Series X/S on 7 June 2022.

== Gameplay ==
SpellForce 3 is a role-playing video game with real-time strategy game elements. Usually, players control a character they created and up to three companions, each with different abilities. Like many role-playing games, these characters can be customized by equipping them with different items such as weapons, armor and jewelry which influence their various abilities and effectiveness in battle. Some maps require players to construct a base of operations and specialized buildings to gather resources and recruit units to defeat larger groups of enemies or fulfill certain tasks.

The game features a story-driven campaign and a skirmish mode which allows players to fight battles on the game's maps without previously playing through the campaign mode. Both modes can be played alone or with other players online. In skirmish mode, players can share responsibilities of managing a single race with others.

Players can create their own character in campaign mode, customizing appearance and gender. They can also choose three different skill trees, depending on the chosen fighting style. All player-created characters have a fourth skill tree called "Leadership" which contains skills related to the real-time strategy parts of the game. Each character has five attributes (strength, dexterity, intelligence, willpower and constitution) which influence what weapons, armor and items they can use as well their health, focus, damage, block and critical strike chances. During the campaign, a number of other characters (companions) can be recruited . All characters gain experience points by killing enemies and completing quests, regardless of whether they were involved in combat or the quest. Experience points allow players to unlock improvements for their character and companions, such as learning new skills, improving attributes and unlocking advanced equipment.

The game uses an isometric perspective that players can rotate to display the environment. Depending on the map, players control a single character or a group. The mouse, along with hotkeys, can be used for actions such as selecting enemies to attack or skills to use. Alternatively, selecting an enemy and holding a certain key will slow down the game and shows a wheel of possible skills to use on the unit. The skill-wheel was added for the first time in the SpellForce series in SpellForce 3 and allows players to quickly select and perform an action.

The player character and their companions (right) using skills in combat. The lower half of the screen displays the status of the units and currently active skills. Available skills can be seen in the upper left section.

Both the main character and companions have magical talents ("skills") which come in three forms: spells, auras and passive. Spells must be activated and sometimes targeted. They allow players to focus a positive or negative effect, e.g. healing a group of friendly units or damaging a certain enemy. Auras have a positive effect on nearby friendly units or a negative effect on nearby enemy units. Passive skills improve a character's abilities directly, such as increasing damage dealt with a certain weapon or heightened health regeneration. Skills are grouped into "skill trees", requiring players to unlock certain skills first before others. All skills can be upgraded once or twice, with the base skill of each tree having eight possible upgrades. Each companion has a special powerful skill that can only be unlocked by completing a side quest. Spells and auras must be "equipped" before they can be used in battle. Players are limited to three spells and/or auras, and must strategically choose which spells or auras to equip. Skills are depicted as pictograms below each character's portrait in the upper left corner of the screen and can be accessed by clicking on them. The game displays potions and equipped items in a slot next to the skills slot.

The game features a World Map from which players can travel to certain locations. When entering a map, the player can choose which companions to accompany them, which influences some quests. Up to three companions can be selected, although sometimes a map requires a certain companion to play. On each map, several "Godstones" allow the player's units to teleport and to revive the player character and companions.

Maps that allow the player to control an army are separated into sectors. The main character or a companion are required to create outposts to expand their territory. This concept was made popular in Z. Resources are limited in each sector and transported by automatic horse carriages between several sectors. The carriages can be attacked by enemies. Unlike in most real-time strategy games, workers are limited in each sector and cannot be controlled directly; instead, they are assigned to a building. Controlled sectors must be next to each other, otherwise resources will not be shared. Because the number of workers is limited for each sector and the number and level of outposts also determines the number of units the player can make, expansion is required to build, harvest resources and create more units. All army units have strengths and weaknesses, meaning they are stronger when fighting certain enemies and more susceptible to damage from others.

Players can choose a race to control when entering a map with real-time strategy elements. There are three races to choose from: elves, humans and orcs, down from six in the first game and nine (bundled in three factions) in the second game. Elves favor defense, including strong buildings and outposts that can defend themselves. Orcs favor fast expansion and brute force. Humans favor defense and offense equally. Advanced units and buildings require the player to find blueprints or buy them from merchants.

== Synopsis ==
=== Setting and characters ===
SpellForce 3 is set in a fictional fantasy world called Eo, 500 years before events in SpellForce: The Order of Dawn. Several races such as humans, elves, orcs and dwarves co-exist and magic is an important part of life. The player controls Tahar, the child of Isamo Tahar. Tahar quests alongside a number of characters that were mentioned in the first game as the mages of The Circle. Among them are Yria, an elven white mage; Isgrimm, a dwarven archaeologist; Rohen Tahir, a human mage and former follower of Isamo; Uram, a demon summoner; Ianna, an assassin; Undergast, a mage who is able to wield both light and dark magic; and Gor, an orcish shaman and chieftain.

=== Plot ===
Isamo Tahar, a powerful mage, has started a rebellion of fellow mages against the crown (known as the Mage Wars). General Sentenza Noria, tasked by the queen of Nortander with eliminating Isamo, travels with his companions – siblings Anselm and Gwen and young Betrand – to Isamo's hideout in The Eye. Upon arrival at Isamo's laboratory, they learn that his child tried to betray him and is about to be executed. Noria saves the child, but Gwen dies and Isamo escapes. Noria takes Isamo's child to the queen, who grants them amnesty and allows them to train as a Wolf Guard.

Eight years later the Mage Wars are over. At some point during the wars, Isamo was killed in an assault on Greykeep castle. A cult called the Purity of Light appears, spurred on by public resentment of the mages. The Purity preaches that Aonir, the god of gods, will return when magic use is banished. The cult persecutes the mages, an action tolerated by the queen's Lord Marshall Angar. Isamo's child (called Tahar) is now a corporal in the Wolf Guard, serving alongside Betrand in Greykeep. When the Bloodburn, a mysterious plague, ravages the kingdom and kills non-mages randomly, they travel to Liannon to discover the Bloodburn is magical in nature. While trying to stop Noria destroying the town, Tahar is attacked by Anselm, who blames Tahar for his sister Gwen's death and they kill Anselm in self-defense. Sentenced to death, Tahar is incarcerated beneath the Keep where they befriend Yria, an elven light magic user. The Purity of Light's leader, Rondar Lacaine, asks for their help to stop the Bloodburn and gives them runes that allow them to use the Godstones. He tasks them to travel to Farlon's Hope to find Isgrimm, a dwarven archaeologist looking for Mulandir, the lost city of the Shapers. The Shapers were an extinct race that ruled Eo with their advanced technology and magic millennia ago.

Tahar and Yria find Isgrimm and Mulandir where Isgrimm determines that the city's Nexus, a powerful energy source and source of Shaper knowledge, might help determine the cause of the Bloodburn. Outbreaks of the plague occur after a Shaper song is heard. Tahar establishes a base of operations in Mulandir and convinces the Mohir Elves, the human Wayfarers and the Orcish Firewielder tribe to help find a cure. They locate the Bloodburn's source inside Isamo's old laboratory in The Eye. Joined by Lacaine, Tahar travels to their father's old laboratory where they fight Noria's forces, who believe Tahar is a traitor. After defeating Noria in battle, they discover that the source of the plague is a Shaper woman, who is also Tahar's mother. In an act of betrayal, Lacaine steals her essence, seals it in an amulet and leaves Tahar to die.

Several weeks later, Tahar awakens in Mulandir to find Lacaine has taken control of Greykeep and is marching on Mulandir. After driving back Lacaine's forces, Tahar, now aided by the Lord Marshall, travels to strengthen their union. After rescuing Angar's sister, the Lady Myriah Ultran, from Lacaine's mind control, they seek an alliance of the remaining noble houses. Lacaine amasses his combined forces in The Golden Road, a region near Greykeep. Tahar's allied forces defeat Lacaine and march on Greykeep, defeating Lacaine's lieutenants and a brainwashed Betrand. They find Lacaine trying to use the essence he stole to summon Aonir, but instead summoning a beast from another world. Tahar defeats Lacaine and the beast, but Angar dies. Shortly afterwards, the queen wakes from her coma. She proposes a committee of mages called The Circle which she invites all of Tahar's companions to join. Tahar's future is left unclear but Yria mentions several things that still need to be done.

== Development ==
The SpellForce series was originally developed by Phenomic, which were bought and later disbanded by Electronic Arts. The original publisher, JoWooD Entertainment, had to file for bankruptcy and was bought by Nordic Games (which later bought the THQ trademark to become THQ Nordic). With the acquisition of JoWooD Entertainment, THQ Nordic also gained the rights to the SpellForce franchise.

Development of SpellForce 3 took over four years. THQ Nordic first mentioned a new entry in the SpellForce series was in development in September 2013, while announcing the release date for SpellForce 2: Demons of the Past, the third expansion for SpellForce 2. Development began at the start of 2014 at the gaming studio Grimlore Games, which THQ Nordic established in Munich in 2013. It was Grimlore Games' first game, although the studio consisted of a number of experienced programmers, designers and graphic artists, who worked on titles like The Settlers II, Knights and Merchants: The Shattered Kingdom and SpellForce 2.

THQ Nordic previewed SpellForce 3 with screenshots at Gamescom 2014 and 2015, sparking interest in the game from trade magazines. The first hands-on preview was shown at Gamescom 2016 where multiple features were demonstrated. Although THQ Nordic announced SpellForce 3 would be released in 2016, the release date was later changed to 7 December 2017, a year later than originally planned.

The developer released patches to address most issues, at one point releasing patches multiple times a day. Within two weeks of release, the developers had issued 21 patches.

On 9 February 2018, THQ Nordic released a level editor and modding tools that allow players to create new maps, quests and campaigns (including MOBA-style maps) with plans to support sharing user-generated content through the Steam Workshop.

=== Soul Harvest expansion ===
On 19 December 2018, THQ Nordic announced a standalone downloadable expansion entitled SpellForce 3: Soul Harvest. Soul Harvest reintroduced dwarves and dark elves as playable races, both of which were featured in previous games but missing in SpellForce 3, adding new units including flying units as well as a new 20-hour single-player campaign. Additionally, the expansion contains new game modes and overhauls some major aspects of the gameplay. Soul Harvest removes resource transports and optimizes the interface and adds more races, classes and skills for heroes as well as more varied races. Changes were made available for all players of the main game in multiplayer when Soul Harvest was released with plans to upgrade the main game's campaign later as well. Soul Harvest was released on 28 May 2019.

=== Fallen God expansion ===
On 3 November 2020, THQ Nordic released the second standalone downloadable expansion entitled SpellForce 3: Fallen God. This expansion reintroduces the troll race with its own campaign, adding another 20 hours of gameplay. Fallen God takes place about 50 years after the events of the main game and does not require knowledge of the main game's story. Unlike other playable races, the troll race uses a tiered approach to unit creation, requiring players to create basic units which can either be used as normal front line fighters or trained to fulfill different roles (melee fighter, ranged fighter, magic user). In addition, trolls can recycle gear for heroes of other races to improve the gear used by the troll heroes. According to THQ Nordic, Fallen God is the last add-on for SpellForce 3.

=== SpellForce 3: Versus ===
Versus is a stand-alone free-to-play version of SpellForce 3 which includes multiplayer mode and a single-map scenario. Players choose one of the main game's three races, humans, elves or orcs, at account creation and can only use that race in the free version of the game. Versus offers skirmishes against the computer AI and ranked multiplayer matches but only a single scenario as a campaign demo.

==== Reforced edition ====
An upgraded version entitled SpellForce 3: Reforced was released for Microsoft Windows, PlayStation 4, PlayStation 5, Xbox One and Xbox Series X/S four years after the release of SpellForce 3 on 6 December 2021. Reforced was made available for free to buyers of the original version of SpellForce 3.

Reforced includes new game modes: Journey Mode allows players to play the game alone or in co-op mode on skirmish maps but also features a campaign system. Unlike in regular free play, players can create a Journey hero which will be the same for all these maps and which can be customized from the races and skill trees from the base game as well as the expansions. Player can play official Journey Mode maps (called "Contracts") but also player-made maps or skirmish maps that are Journey Mode compatible in order to level up their hero and gain new equipment that is then saved to the hero and available on the next map they choose. Journey Mode maps also contain quests that carry over between maps as well as fully voiced dialogue for the hero and various non-player characters. Arena Mode pits players against ever-increasing hordes of enemy units. Reforced also bring mechanics and designs introduced in the expansions to the base game as well as improvements to graphics, artificial intelligence and loot distribution.

== Reception ==
Reception

Aggregate score
Aggregator	Score
Metacritic	73/100

Review scores
Publication	Score
Eurogamer	Recommended
GameSpot	7/10
GameStar	Original release: 77/100; Reforced edition: 84/100
PC Gamer (US)	74/100
PC Games (DE)	7/10

SpellForce 3 garnered "mixed or average reviews" from critics according to review aggregator Metacritic, based on 37 reviews for Windows.

Critics lauded the visual design and the attention to detail as well as the variety of settings and lighting effects which enhanced the realism of the landscapes. Reviewers also highlighted the character and building models and details. German magazine PC Games compared the graphics and level of detail positively to The Witcher 3: Wild Hunt, although they noted the game no longer offered a third person perspective as previous games of the series did. GameSpot criticized the amount of detail, which caused slow loading times and overwhelmed the player, making it hard to notice certain important elements.

The attention to detail and the variety of settings were praised by critics. Reviewers especially noted the lighting effects, which enhanced the realism of the visual design.

The soundtrack of SpellForce 3 was considered to fit well and helped to create the game's atmosphere. Opinions on the sound effects were mixed. While some critics emphasized they helped establish a great ambience, others considered them sub-par, highlighting (among other reasons) that combat sounds don't exactly match displayed combat and some effects feel generic, out of place and repetitive. Reviewers were also divided over the game's voice acting, with Wccftech opining that the voice actors were not skilled enough and at least one voice actor was miscast to the point of distraction. It was also noted the written dialog does not match the speech in several places. Conversely, other reviewers lauded the voice acting, especially of the main characters. Eurogamer drew another parallel to The Witcher series, noting Doug Cockle, the voice of Geralt of Rivia, plays General Noria in a similar voice. For the German original version, the voice acting was generally considered good, although reviewers noted that orcs sounded too tame and that the narrator's voice acting did not fit with the game's atmosphere.

The plot and storytelling also drew mixed reactions. Some reviewers noted the game offers a compelling story with believable characters and ample lore. PC Gamer praised the story but noted the number of similarities to Dragon Age and The Witcher, and criticized the companions as likeable but not memorable. Jeuxvideo considered the plot too generic and simple and Wccftech criticized the forced deliverance. GameSpot also noted that although some choices can be made, they never change the story enough to make players want to replay the game.

The combination of role-playing and real-time strategy was considered a success, with many reviewers noting the unique and cohesive experience created by the merger. Critics also praised the smooth transition between role-playing and real-time strategy and how naturally the real-time strategy elements fit into the story. Some critics noted the differences between the races (humans, orcs and elves) in real-time strategy mode were mostly cosmetic and without real distinctions and the real-time strategy parts were weak on their own. Conversely, some reviewers noted that by trying to be two games at once, SpellForce 3 failed to be outstanding in either category.

The game's multiplayer was considered by some, such as Eurogamer, as decent but unspectacular. Rock, Paper, Shotgun expressed surprise that the multiplayer worked so well despite the missing context of the single player campaign and associated quests.

A major criticism was the game's technical issues on release. Critics likened the release to a beta version and pointed out various bugs, such as missing triggers for missions and broken quests, leave players unable to progress in the game. Further criticism was directed at the slow camera rotation, and units' movement speeds and pathfinding. GameStar considered the number of bugs severe enough to deduct 15 points (out of 100) from their score of 82. The magazine later updated the score to 77/100 after most bugs were fixed and later upgraded the score to 84 upon release of the Reforced edition. Both Gamestar and fellow German trade publication PC Games, which did not review the game until version 1.21 had been released, advised players to wait until the bugs were fixed before buying the game. Reaction from players was equally mixed, with many criticizing the technical issues on release.
