= SpellForce 2: Faith in Destiny =

- Developer(s): Trine Games
- Publisher(s): Nordic Games
- Series: SpellForce
- Platform(s): Microsoft Windows
- Release: WW: June 19, 2012
- Genre(s): Real-time strategy, role-playing video game
- Mode(s): Single-player, multiplayer

SpellForce 2: Faith in Destiny is the second expansion for SpellForce 2, developed by Indian studio Trine Games. It was released on June 19, 2012, after several delays.

== Development ==
It was announced by JoWooD in May 2009 that this expansion would be delayed due to funding issues, at the time stating the most likely release date being pushed back to the 2nd fiscal quarter of 2011.

On March 25, 2011, JoWooD Entertainment has announced that the game has been delayed indefinitely, the main reasons being that the game needs more polishing and testing.

In October 2011, Nordic Games expressed their desire to continue the work that JoWooD Entertainment was doing on different projects, including the release of Faith in Destiny.

On March 14, 2012, Nordic Games announced that the second addon for SpellForce 2 will be released on May 15, 2012.

However, because Diablo III's release on 15 May 2012 'may possibly cause a global decrease in productivity,' Nordic Games decided to postpone the release date until June 19, 2012.

== Plot ==
Four years have passed since the Shaper was conquered by the power of the Archfire. Four years in which scientists, dragons and inventors have tried to find a way to counter the deterioration of the portal - but to no avail.

The portal network has broken down and the islands are completely cut off from one another. The dragons and the Shaikan are the only interface left between the races, but their resources are limited.

The new enemy has been lying low for just such a moment. The races are cut off from one another and the islands are exposed to attackers, who fall upon them from demonic depths.

In the midst of this chaos a new hero enters the scenery. He is a simple Shaikan, a member of the Hand, who has embarked on a quest for answers to his deeply disturbing dreams. This quest takes him to the very roots of his race, to the Iron Fields, to the Mountain of the Patriarch Ur. It is all about his destiny, about his soul. After all it is the only thing he knows. However instead of finding answers he only finds more questions. Who are these daemonic creatures - so abysmally evil that they are known as "The Nameless"? What do the dragons know about the destiny of this world? And what does Professor Twiddle’s plan to restore the portal have to do with all this?

The hero is gradually coming closer to his own destiny through this journey - through conversations, through newly acquired skills and through battles fought against old and new enemies.

Wherever he goes - The Nameless are one step ahead of him and an almost futile battle breaks out in which our hero holds not only his own destiny but the destiny of entire Eo in his hands.
