= SingShot Media =

- Company type: Subsidiary
- Industry: Social networking platform
- Founded: February 2006; 20 years ago
- Founder: Ranah Edelin; Niranjan Nagar
- Headquarters: San Francisco, CA, United States
- Parent: Electronic Arts (from 2007)

SingShot Media was initially a social networking song-sharing platform founded in February 2006 by Ranah Edelin and Niranjan Nagar, headquartered in San Francisco, CA, United States. They were acquired by Electronic Arts on February 12, 2007. It was acquired in order to expand EA's community-building and user-generated content. The online The Sims on Stage was created by the company after their acquisition by EA.
