= List of acquisitions by Electronic Arts =

Electronic Arts logo

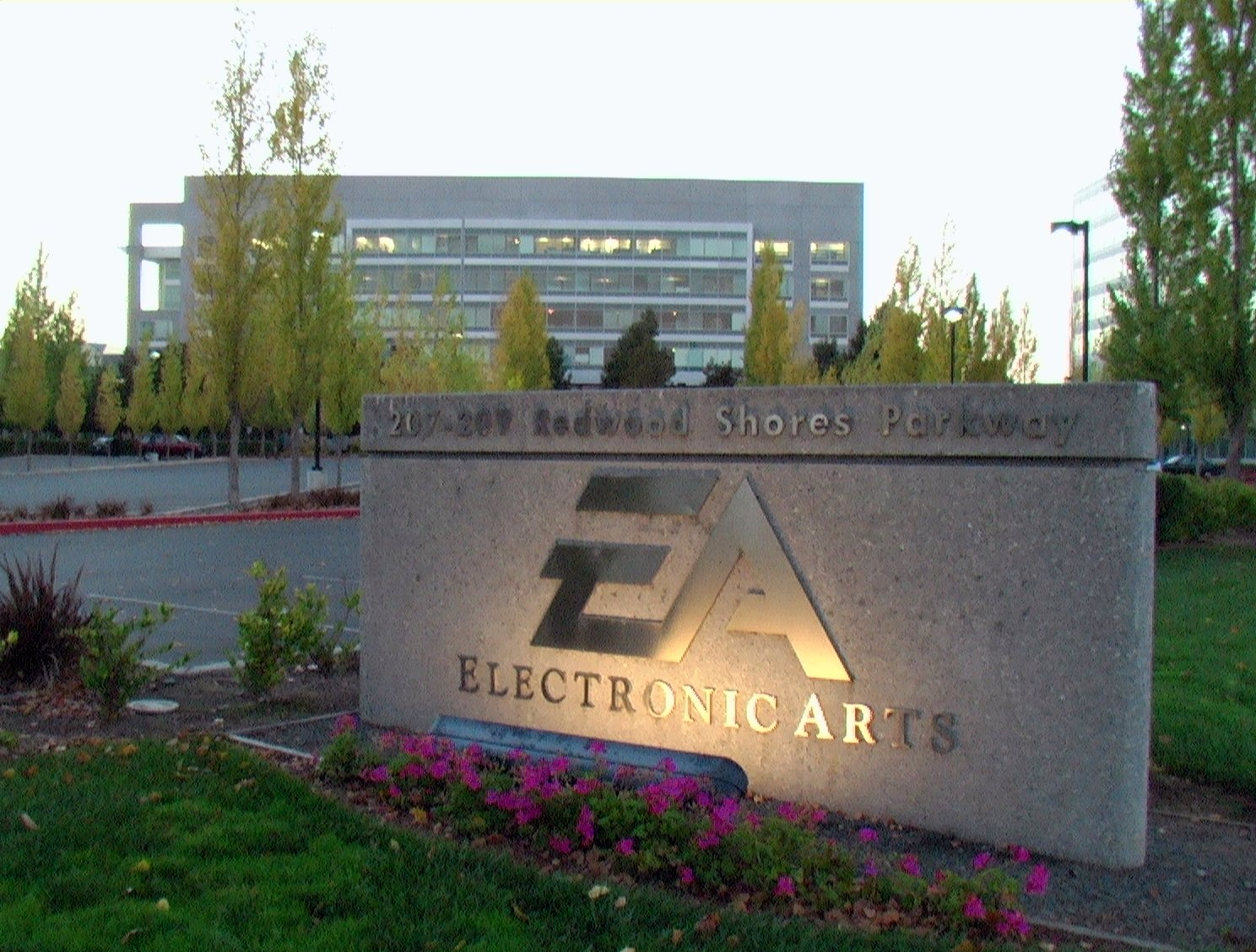
EA headquarters in Redwood City, California

Electronic Arts is an American video game company that is a developer, marketer, publisher, and distributor of video games, that was founded in 1982. Products of the company include EA Sports franchises, Sims, and other titles on both handheld and home gaming consoles.

Electronic Arts often acquires new companies to expand or add to new product lines. For instance, EA chairman and chief executive officer Larry Probst said after the acquisition of JAMDAT Mobile that "we intend to build a leading global position in the [...] business of providing games on mobile phones". EA followed through with this later, making the company into EA Mobile, and allowing people to purchase and download content produced by them directly onto their phones.

The company has a reputation for purchasing companies and mismanaging them or outright shutting them down. The majority of their acquisitions are now defunct, with some having been merged into other entities. Of the six companies which EA purchased a stake in, two remaining companies are based in the U.S., while three other U.S. companies are defunct. After acquiring a 19.9% stake in France-based Ubisoft in 2004, EA sold a remaining 14.8% stake in it in 2010.

Electronic Arts was itself acquired in a large leveraged buyout in 2026, by a consortium including the Saudi Public Investment Fund along with Silver Lake and Affinity Partners. The latter is led by Jared Kushner, the son-in-law of Donald Trump.

== Acquisitions ==
Key
†	Defunct
‡	Merged into surviving group

Each acquisition listed is for the entire company, unless otherwise noted. The acquisition date listed is the date of the agreement between Electronic Arts (EA) and the subject of the acquisition. Unless otherwise noted, the value of each acquisition is listed in U.S. dollars, because EA is headquartered in the U.S. If the value of the acquisition is not listed, then it is undisclosed. If the EA service that is derived from the acquired company is known, then it is also listed. According to data from Pitch Book via VentureBeat, the company has spent about $2.9 Billion on its 10 biggest acquisitions since 1992.

	Date	Company	Business	Country	Value (USD)	Adjusted (USD)	Derived Studios	References
1	1987	Batteries Included†	Hardware and software developer	CAN	—	—	—	
2	July 1, 1991	Distinctive Software Inc.‡	Video game developer	CAN	—	—	EA Vancouver	
3	September 10, 1992	Origin Systems†	Video game developer	USA	$35,000,000	$80,000,000	—	
4	November 14, 1994	DROsoft†	Software distributor	ESP	—	—	—	
5	January 6, 1995	Bullfrog Productions†	Video game developer	UK	—	—	—	
6	March 8, 1995	Kingsoft GmbH†	Software distributor	GER	—	—	—	
7	January 29, 1996	Manley & Associates†	Video game developer	USA	—	—	EA Seattle†	
8	April 8, 1996	Vision Software†	Software distributor	RSA	—	—	EA Africa†	
9	June 4, 1997	Maxis†	Video game developer and publisher	USA	$125,000,000	$251,000,000	Maxis (Note: While Maxis Emeryville was closed, other Maxis groups were consolidated into existing studios of EA. New studios using the brand name began opening in 2019.)	
10	April 2, 1998	Tiburon Entertainment‡	Video game developer	USA	—	—	EA Tiburon	
11	July 28, 1998	ABC Software†	Video game developer	CH	—	—	—	
12	August 17, 1998	Westwood Studios; Virgin Interactive's North American Operations, Burst Studios†	Computer and video game developers	USA	$122,500,000	$242,000,000	EA Pacific† (Note: Staff who choose to remain were absorbed into EA Los Angeles.)	
13	September 8, 1999	PlayNation‡	Developer of online entertainment	USA	—	—	PlayNation	
14	November 22, 1999	Kesmai†	Video game developer and online game publisher	USA	—	—	—	
15	February 24, 2000	DreamWorks Interactive†	Video game developer	USA	—	—	Danger Close Games†	
16	February 28, 2001	Pogo.com	Family games website	USA	—	—	—	
17	June 11, 2002	Black Box Games†	Sports and racing video game developer	CAN	—	—	Quicklime Games†	
18	October 16, 2003	Studio 33‡	Racing video game developer	UK	—	—	EA Northwest	
19	February 13, 2004	NuFX†	Sports video game developer	USA	—	—	EA Chicago†	
20	July 28, 2004	Criterion Software	Video game developer	UK	$48,000,000	$82,000,000	—	
21	July 27, 2005	Hypnotix†	Video game developer	USA	—	—	EA Tiburon	
22	December 8, 2005	JAMDAT Mobile‡	Mobile entertainment developer	USA	$680,000,000	$1.121×10^{9}	EA Mobile	
23	July 20, 2006	Mythic Entertainment†	Computer game developer	USA	—	—	EA Mythic†	
24	August 23, 2006	Phenomic Game Development†	Real-time strategy game developer	GER	—	—	EA Phenomic†	
25	October 2, 2006	Digital Illusions CE (DICE)‡ (Note: DICE Ontario was closed down; the Stockholm studio persists under the "EA DICE" label.)	Video game developer	SWE	—	—	EA DICE	
26	November 30, 2006	Headgate Studios†	Video game developer	USA	—	—	EA Salt Lake†	
27	February 12, 2007	SingShot Media‡	Social network service	USA	—	—	EA Mobile	
28	October 5, 2007	Super Computer International‡	Computer software developer	USA	—	—	EA Online Technology‡	
29	October 11, 2007	VG Holding Corp.†	Holding company of video game developers	USA	$775,000,000	1.203×10^{9}	BioWare†	
30	May 21, 2008	Hands-On Mobile‡	Mobile video game developer and publisher	ROK	—	—	EA Mobile Korea	
31	June 3, 2008	ThreeSF†	Social network service	USA	—	—	—	
32	December 2, 2008	J2MSoft†	Computer game developer	ROK	—	—	—	
33	Q1 Fiscal 2010	J2Play†	Social network service	CAN	—	—	—	
34	November 9, 2009	Playfish†	Social network game developer	UK	$400,000,000	600,000,000	—	
35	February 24, 2010	IronMonkey‡	Mobile video game developer	AUS	—	—	Firemonkeys Studios	
36	October 20, 2010	Chillingo†	Mobile video game publisher	UK	$20,000,000	30,000,000	—	
37	May 3, 2011	Mobile Post Production‡	Mobile video game developer and publisher	USA	—	—	EA Mobile	
38	May 4, 2011	Firemint‡	Mobile video game developer and publisher	AUS	—	—	Firemonkeys Studios	
39	July 12, 2011	PopCap Games	Video game developer and publisher	USA	$750,000,000 (Note: Includes $650 million in cash and the issuing of $100 million in EA common stock to certain shareholders of PopCap Games. Does not include additional cash possibly received based on earnings before interest and taxes milestones through December 2013.)	1.073×10^{9}	—	
40	August 11, 2011	Bight Games‡	Trade Wars (mobile game)	CAN	—	—	Red Crow Studios	
41	June 1, 2012	ESN	Social gaming product developers	SWE	—	—	—	
42	December 1, 2017	Respawn Entertainment	Video game developer	USA	$315,000,000 (Note: Includes $151 million in cash and $164 million in equity.)	414,000,000	—	
43	May 1, 2018	GameFly	Game streaming	USA	—	—	—	
44	July 9, 2018	Industrial Toys†	Mobile video game developer	USA	—	—	—	
45	February 18, 2021	Codemasters	Video game developer and publisher	UK	$1,200,000,000	$1.426×10^{9}	—	
46	April 29, 2021	Glu Mobile	Mobile video game developer and publisher	USA	$2,400,000,000	$2.852×10^{9}	EA Mobile	
47	May 5, 2021	Metalhead Software	Video game developer	CAN	—	—	—	
48	June 23, 2021	Playdemic	Mobile video game developer	UK	$1,400,000,000	$1.663×10^{9}	—	
49	February 4, 2025	TRACAB Technologies	Sports tracking platform	SWE	—	—	—	

== Stakes ==
Key
†	Defunct
*	Electronic Arts sold stake

Beginning in 1995 the company at times held stakes in other studios. It ended the practice after selling off a stake in Ubisoft in 2010.

Date	Company	Business	Country	Value	Adjusted	References
January 25, 1995	Visual Concepts Entertainment* (Note: EA purchased a minority stake, later sold to Take 2 Interactive.)	Video game developer	USA	—	—	
May 9, 1995	NovaLogic† (Note: EA purchased a minority stake, yet there is no mention of it on EA's Investor Page. Later sold to THQ Nordic in 2016)	Video game developer and publisher	USA	—	—	
March 11, 1997	Accolade† (Note: EA purchased a minority stake. Later purchased by Infogrames.)	Video game developer and publisher	USA	—	—	
April 3, 1997	Mpath Interactive† (Note: EA purchased a minority stake. On June 18, 2001, it was acquired by GameSpy and MPlayer.com was merged with GameSpy Arcade.)	Computer game and online company	USA	—	—	
August 4, 1998	Kodiak Interactive Software Studios, Inc.† (Note: EA purchased a minority stake, but it later merged with Acclaim Entertainment.)	Video game developer	USA	—	—	
December 24, 2004	Ubisoft* (Note: EA initially purchased a 19.9% stake then-valued at 68.9 million euros, but then sold its remaining stake in July 2010 for 122 million U.S. dollars (94 million euros).)	Video game developer and publisher	FRA	68.9 million euros	0 million euros	
