= SpellForce 2: Shadow Wars =

2006 video game

- Original box art
- Developer: Phenomic
- Publishers: EU: JoWooD Productions; EU: Deep Silver; NA: Aspyr Media; NA: Dreamcatcher Interactive; AU: Auran
- Series: SpellForce
- Platform: Microsoft Windows
- Release: Shadow Wars: GER: 7 April 2006; UK: 20 April 2006; NA: 2 May 2006; Dragon Storm: EU: 23 March 2007; AU: 30 April 2007; NA: 14 May 2007; SpellForce Universe: NA: 15 October 2007; PAL: 3 April 2008
- Genres: Real-time strategy, role-playing
- Modes: Single player, multiplayer

SpellForce 2: Shadow Wars is a 2006 real-time strategy and role-playing video game, developed by Phenomic, published by JoWooD Productions, and released for Microsoft Windows in 2006. The game takes place after the events of 2003's SpellForce: The Order of Dawn, with players taking on the role of an immortal warrior known as "The Soulcarrier", who seeks aid to liberate his homeland from invaders, only to be drawn on a quest to defeat a powerful alchemist responsible for creating the immortality of the warrior and his people.

The game combines traditional role-playing elements such as taking on quests, equipping characters and improving them with levelling up, alongside real-time strategy elements that focus on gathering resources to construct bases and train an army of units to help in defeating opposing forces, with the game featuring a selection of factions to control. The main campaign can be played solo, or with up to three players either via an online connection or with a local area network. In addition to this, players can engage in skirmish matches against an AI, or online matches against other players.

Shadow Wars received positive reviews from critics, who praised it for improving in many areas that the first game had been lacking in, including its graphics and audio design. It received three expansions following its release: SpellForce 2: Dragon Storm in 2007; SpellForce 2: Faith in Destiny in 2012; and SpellForce 2: Demons of the Past in 2014. A remastered version of Shadow Wars, complete with its first expansion and featuring an updated engine with widescreen support, was later released in April 2017, and a sequel, SpellForce 3, was released later that year on 7 December.

== Gameplay ==
SpellForce 2: Shadow Wars is played from a third-person perspective, in which players control a custom-made avatar to explore a variety of maps in the game. The game makes use of traditional elements from both real-time strategy and role-playing video games, in which players take on various quests, kill monsters and earn experience to level up and improve skills and unlock the ability to wield new equipment, while at times having to build bases, gathering resources for the construction of buildings, and training units to fight against opposing armies.

For the role-playing aspect of the game, players create an avatar for interaction with the game's world, though with no class definition when created compared to SpellForce: The Order of Dawn. By earning experience from completing quests and defeating certain enemies to level up, the avatar can allocate skill points towards skills the player wishes them to learn, effectively defining what abilities they can have assigned for use in combat, as well as what equipment they can make be equip to themselves - primarily weapons, shields, and armour; accessories like amulets and rings are exempt from this. The game features two skill trees – combat and magic – in which players can allocate skill points within, not only to unlock skills, but to upgrade them further with enhanced bonuses; the player can decide to let the computer automatically allocate skill points when levelling up, as well as assign which abilities they can use in battle. Quests acquired in the game consist of main quests that progress the game's story, and side quests that offer bonuses.

For the real-time strategy aspect of the game, players work to build up bases, gathering resources to build structures and train units, with the ability of forming groups to help with taking on opposing bases. In Shadow Wars the game features three different factions: the Realm, consisting of human, dwarven and elven units; the Clans, consisting of orc, troll and barbarian units; and the Pact, consisting of dark elf, gargoyle, and shadow units. Units that can be trained consist of close-range, long-range, and support units, with some consisting of mounted and flying troops, with each faction having their own unique unit called a "Titan"; only one of which can be provided for a player's army at any one time. The amount of troops that can be in the army is defined by the number of farms (normal and upgraded) the player has, as well as racial upgrades at a faction's headquarters - as a rule, each unit consumes a set number of army slots, with better units consuming more slots. Each faction's race has their own military building for training troops, as well as a tech building that grants access to the better units.

All units and structures requires resources to be gathered by workers, who can bring them to gathering structures or to a faction's headquarter – these consist of stone, mostly needed for construction; silver, needed mainly for training; and lenya, mainly needed for stronger unit training and some upgrades. The player is limited in the number of workers, with the cost for training them increasing past certain thresholds. Defensive towers can protect bases, with each faction having three different upgrades that not only strengthen its hit points, but confer a bonus to its effectiveness.

In the game's campaign mode, players visit various inter-linked islands, each of which features a series of main quests that need to be completed to progress the story. Along with portals to move between islands, the player can make use of Journey Stones – a fast-travel system for moving between and around islands – though like in Order of Dawn players cannot move between islands when an island's main story quests are active, until these are completed. During the course of the campaign, the player will encounter companions that join the avatar's party: some are permanent, and can have their equipment changed and their skill sets manually altered when levelling up; others are temporary, cannot have their equipment changed, but level up and be controllable. Like Order of Dawn such companions are lower in level than the avatar. The game is over when any party members or all of them are killed without reviving them; if the avatar or a companion dies, the others can revive them if done so within three minutes, otherwise they must make use of a monument called the "Altar of Life" (which each faction has) and enough lenya on hand to resurrect them.

The campaign itself can be done solo, or with other players either online or via a LAN network. In addition, the player can compete against other players in Multiplayer mode, with different match types and maps to make use of. A Freeplay mode, similar to the one in Order of Dawn allows players to explore the campaign world without the need to complete quests.

== Plot ==
=== Setting ===
SpellForce 2: Shadow Wars takes place on Eo – a high-fantasy world inhabited by several races, including humans, elves, dwarves and orcs – that was formed by the god Aonir, and originally consisted of large continents and various islands, with large oceans and seas. But after a cataclysmic event known as the Convocation shattered the world, the remaining landmass became islands, each held together around an obelisk called Aonir's Tower. While the islands float on an elemental sea that no ships can traverse, a powerful mage created a portal network to ensure the surviving inhabitants of Eo can remain connected to each other.

Prior to the Convocation, and the war that caused it, an alchemist named Malacay sought to acquire knowledge on the gem of life, in order to defy the gods and create a force of beings named the Malar to control the world. To this end, he made use of a blood pact he formed with the dragon patriarch Ur, leading to his descendants becoming immortal warriors called the Shaikah. Malacay's efforts corrupted his spirit, before he was eventually defeated by Eo's gods for his actions. Following his defeat, the Shaikah went into isolation due to the fear and distrust from the other races, with Ur serving as their guardian and to ensure they honor the blood pact. While the Shaikah have the power to resurrect the fallen into another of their group, Malacay's spirit curses them, returning once every generation to possess one of the Shaikah in hopes of resuming his plans.

The game's story takes place twelve years after the events of Order of Dawn, within a group of inter-linked islands that used to form the southern half of the continent of Fiara. Players assume the role of the Soul Carrier, a young member of the Shaikah, who is forced to leave their home to seek aid in defending it, aided by close Shaikah friends, and making new ones who they share their blood with.

=== Synopsis ===
For several months, a civil war within the Pact has seen the dark elves slowly side with the powerful dark elf sorcerer Sorvina and her army of shadows. After witnessing her father die in battle, Nightsong flees her homeland for the territories of the Realm, to warn them of Sorvina's plans to invade, but is killed when she reaches the Iron Fields, home to the Shaikah. Resurrected by the Soul Carrier, after they and their friends find her body, they bring her to the Shaikah's guardian Ur, a dragon patriarch. Concerned with her story, Ur instructs the Soul Carrier to take Nightsong, to meet the leader of the Realm at their capital in Sevenskeep. Shortly after leaving, they learn Sorvina and the Pact invaded their homelands, prompting them to seek the Realm's aid in retaking Iron Fields. King Ulf, the Realm's leader, refuses their request until matters with the dwarves and elfs can be resolved.

Visiting the dwarves and elfs in their homelands and dealing with their troubles, the Soul Carrier gains Ulf's assistance to lead a force to retake Iron Fields. Despite reclaiming their homeland, they are angered to learn Sorvina killed many of the Shaikah and abducted Ur. As a result of their heated emotions, the spirit of the alchemist Malacay, whom the Shaikah are descended from, temporarily takes over the Soul Carrier and proceeds to insult the Realm's troop commanders, ending their alliance to them. As a result, the Iron Fields becomes the property of the Realm, leaving the Soul Carrier to use the island of Westguard, gifted to them by Ulf, as the Shaikah's new home, leaving its remaining members to become a mercenary force. Knowing they need new allies, Nightsong recommends seeking aid from the Clans, led by the Iron Lord, whose forces could help them breach the defenses on the border's of the Pact's lands. The Soul Carrier agrees, and proceeds to the Clan's main camp for aid in rescuing Ur.

Whilst Nightsong negotiates with the Iron Lord, the Soul Carrier is greeted by the leader of the shadows, the Shadow Warrior, in her absence, who offers to defect to their cause if they can recover the mirror Sorvina uses to control his kind. After completing the request, the Shadow Warrior has the shadows abandon Sorvina's forces, allowing the Clan to defeat their defences. However, Malacay once again possesses the Soul Carrier and insults the Clan, leading the Iron Lord to end their alliance. Entering into the Pact's lands, the Soul Carrier and their friends are captured by Sorvina, who reveals she sought the Shaikah's power to make herself unstoppable. After extracting what she needs from the Soul Carrier, Sorvina finds herself completely possessed by Malacay and flees the scene. A fatally wounded Ur instructs the Soul Carrier to pursue after Malacay, revealing he intends to resume his work to conquer Eo with creatures he made called the Malar, before dying from his wounds.

After rescuing their friends, the Soul Carrier receives aid from Nightsong and Pact forces loyal to her, and begins working combatting Sorvina's forces across their lands. They soon learn Malacay is heading to a hidden hideout whose entrance lies in the Crystal Forest. They eventually find the entrance to the hideout, where inside Malacay begins summoning their Malar creatures. Following a difficult battle against them, the Soul Carrier defeats Malacay by killing the possessed Sorvina, expelling his spirit from Eo for good and ending the curse on the Shaikah. Nightsong decides to honor her father's memory by becoming the Pact's new leader, while the Soul Carrier decides to take their friends on a new journey to search for "a dragon".

== Release ==
The Russian and European versions of SpellForce 2 are protected by StarForce copy protection system. The NA version is protected by TAGES.

While the game originally featured a central online matchmaking service, this service shut down in 2009. Originally, the developers announced that a new contract for resuming matchmaking would take effect around July 2009. However, as of February 2010, the online matchmaking is still unavailable. Multiplayer is still possible via LAN or by using a service such as Hamachi.

The game was re-released in 2008 on GamersGate and Steam, and in 2011 on GOG.com. In April 2017 Spellforce 2: Shadow Wars and SpellForce 2: Dragon Storm were released with an updated engine and widescreen support as Spellforce 2: Anniversary Edition. In October 2007, SpellForce Universe Edition was released which contained all previous SpellForce games and expansion packs.

== Reception ==
SpellForce 2: Shadow Wars was well received by both critics and players. According to the Metacritic website, it obtained a score of 80/100 from critics, as of August 24, 2014.

Many of the criticisms of the original SpellForce (e.g. poor integration of role-playing game and real time strategy aspects, a confusing interface, and an overly cumbersome real time strategy system) were improved upon in this sequel. While many reviewers indicate that SpellForce 2: Shadow Wars is one of the best hybrid games to date, most acknowledge that it presents little innovation for either of its role-playing game or real time strategy genres.
