= Criticism of Electronic Arts =

Overview of criticism related to Electronic Arts Inc.

Electronic Arts logo

Since the 2010s and before, the American video game company Electronic Arts (EA) has been at the center of numerous controversies involving acquisitions of companies and anti-consumer practices in their individual games, as well as lawsuits alleging anti-competitive practices on EA's part when signing sports-related contracts. In 2012 and 2013, the company was named "Worst Company in America" by Consumerist, while it was named the 5th most hated company in the United States by USA Today in 2018.

== Studio acquisitions and closures ==
During the early 2000s, when EA was in a period of fast growth, the company developed a reputation of acquiring development studios, primarily for their intellectual property (IP) assets rather than the studios' talent, and then subsequently forcing changes on the studios' work product that impacted the quality or scope of the game, and/or determining the studios were no longer necessary due to the poor performances of their games and dissolving them. This created an appearance that EA was handling games as if it were an assembly line, only looking to put out as much product as possible without care for the content or the creative staff that were behind the creation of the games. The company gained the derogatory nickname as the "Evil Empire" within the video game industry as a result of these business practices.

EA's handling of Origin Systems, the studio behind the Ultima series, is considered a key example of this business practice. EA acquired Origin in 1992. Under EA, Origin was pushed into quickly finishing two Ultima titles, Ultima VIII: Pagan and Ultima IX: Ascension, despite protests from the studio's founder Richard Garriott. Both titles were poorly received compared to the previous entries in the series. Between these, Origin had also developed Ultima Online which had been successful. Following development of Ultima IX, the studio had started work on Ultima Online 2, but due to the poor sales of Ultima IX, EA cancelled that work, leaving Origin primarily to support Ultima Online until EA decided to shutter the studio in 2004, moving the remaining staff to other divisions within EA. Other studios considered to have been affected by EA's handling include Bullfrog Productions, Westwood Studios, Maxis, and Pandemic Studios.

By 2008, EA had started altering its practices, in part due to the appointment of a new CEO, John Riccitiello. Riccitiello acknowledged in 2008 that the company's prior practices towards acquisition were wrong and that the company now gave acquired studios greater autonomy without "meddling" in their corporate culture. The company's CFO Blake Jorgensen similarly acknowledged this prior practice was "somewhat marginal in performance" in a statement in 2014, and that going forward, the company would likely slow down on acquisitions and giving the opportunity for their internal studios to help produce major titles instead. This sentiment was echoed by those that had worked in EA in the past and present. In 2008, John D. Carmack of id Software, in announcing that EA would publish their upcoming title Rage, said that EA was no longer the "Evil Empire": Carmack said "I'll admit that, if you asked me years ago, I still had thoughts that EA was the Evil Empire, the company that crushes the small studios... I'd have been surprised, if you told me a year ago that we'd end up with EA as a publisher. When we went out and talked to people, especially EA Partners people like Valve, we got almost uniformly positive responses from them." Peter Molyneux, who had founded Bullfrog, also said that EA was not an "Evil Empire" in an interview in 2014, but acknowledged that when studios are acquired by the likes of EA, the added funds and additional support, such as larger offices, "changes the flavor of the company" and can lead to events that can lead to poor performance from the studio.

While the company's reputation in managing studios had improved since 2008, EA's closure of Visceral Games in 2017 was considered by Engadget as a return to EA's "bad habit of shuttering well-known studios".

EA was once criticized for the acquisition of 19.9 percent of shares of its competitor Ubisoft, a move that Ubisoft's then spokesperson initially described as a "hostile act". However, Ubisoft CEO Yves Guillemot later indicated that a merger with EA was a possibility, stating, "The first option for us is to manage our own company and grow it. The second option is to work with the movie industry, and the third is to merge." However, in July 2010, EA elected to sell its reduced 15 percent share in Ubisoft. That share equated to roughly €94 million (US$122 million).

== Treatment of employees ==
In the video game industry, it is not uncommon for publishers and developers to have employees work extra hours near the last few weeks or months of the development cycle to make sure a game is released on time, often unpaid as such workers are classified as exempt from overtime pay; this is commonly known as "crunch time". In 2004, EA was criticized for employees working extraordinarily long hours, up to 100 hours per week, as a routine practice rather than during the "crunch time" period. Erin Hoffman, the fiancée of an EA employee, posted an "EA Spouse" blog anonymously as a "disgruntled spouse" in 2004, describing some of the worktime demands EA had made of her fiancé, such as "The current mandatory hours are 9 a.m. to 10 p.m.—seven days a week—with the occasional Saturday evening off for good behavior (at 6:30 PM)."

Hoffman's blog went viral and brought awareness of this "crunch culture" to the forefront of the industry. Two class action lawsuits were filed against EA by employees. The first was filed originally in 2004 by video game artists looking to be compensated for unpaid overtime. EA settled with the class for US$15.6 million by 2006. In addition to the settlement funds, EA reclassified several of the low-level developers into hourly-rate schedules to qualify for overtime in the future, but forgoing company stock options. A second suit was brought against EA by programmers, and was similarly settled in 2006 for US$14.9 million. Additionally, Hoffman's blog led a general trend across the game industry to address the matter of crunch time, though as of 2015 it remains a significant industry issue.

Since these criticisms first aired, it has been reported that EA has taken steps to address work-life balance concerns by focusing on long-term project planning, compensation, and communication with employees. These efforts accelerated with the arrival of John Riccitiello as CEO in February 2007. In December 2007, an internal EA employee survey showed a 13% increase in employee morale and a 21% increase in perception of management recognition over a three-year period. In May 2008, Hoffman said EA had made significant progress, but may now be falling into old patterns again. She said "I think EA is tremendously reformed, having made some real strong efforts to get the right people into their human resources department", and "I've been hearing from people who have gotten overtime pay there and I think that makes a great deal of difference. In fact, I've actually recommended to a few people I know to apply for jobs there", but she also said she has begun to hear "horror stories" once again.

The crunch culture at EA has since been mentioned in association with other games, with the excessive crunch having said to contribute towards the poor quality of the game. Such titles including 2006's Superman Returns which suffered from culture changes as EA reacted to the class action lawsuits, and 2019's Anthem.

== Game quality ==
EA's aggregate review performance had shown a downward trend in quality over recent years and was expected to affect market shares during competitive seasons. Pacific Crest Securities analyst Evan Wilson had said, "Poor reviews and quality are beginning to tarnish the EA brand. According to our ongoing survey of GameRankings.com aggregated review data, Electronic Arts' overall game quality continues to fall... Although market share has not declined dramatically to date, in years such as 2007, which promises to have tremendous competition, it seems likely if quality does not improve."

EA has also received criticism for developing games that lack innovation vis-à-vis the number of gaming titles produced under the EA brand that show a history of yearly updates, particularly in their EA Sports franchises. These typically retail as new games at full market price and feature only updated team rosters in addition to incremental changes to game mechanics, the user interface, soundtracks, and graphics. One critique compared EA to companies like Ubisoft and concluded that EA's innovation in new and old IPs "Crawls along at a snail's pace," while even the company's own CEO, John Riccitiello, acknowledged the lack of innovation seen in the industry generally, saying, "We're boring people to death and making games that are harder and harder to play. For the most part, the industry has been rinse-and-repeat. There's been lots of product that looked like last year's product, that looked a lot like the year before." EA has announced that it is turning its attention to creating new game IPs in order to stem this trend, with recently acquired and critically acclaimed studios BioWare and Pandemic would be contributing to this process. In 2012, EA's games were ranked highest of all large publishers in the industry, according to Metacritic.

== Sports licensing and exclusivity ==
On June 5, 2008, a lawsuit was filed in Oakland, California alleging EA was breaking United States antitrust laws by signing exclusive contracts with the NFL Players Association, the NCAA and Arena Football League, to use players' names, likenesses and team logos. This keeps other companies from being able to sign the same agreements. The suit further accuses EA of raising the price of games associated with these licenses as a result of this action. In an interview with GameTap, Peter Moore said it was the NFL that sought the deal. "To be clear, the NFL was the entity that wanted the exclusive relationship. EA bid, as did a number of other companies, for the exclusive relationship", Moore said. "It wasn't on our behest that this went exclusive... We bid and we were very fortunate and lucky and delighted to be the winning licensee." While EA argued the player's likenesses was incidentally used (through they had a contract to do so based on information listed earlier in this paragraph), this was rejected by the United States Courts of Appeals in 2015. A further appeal to the US Supreme Court was unsuccessful. In June 2016, EA settled with Jim Brown for $600,000.

On September 26, 2013, EA settled a series of wide-ranging class action lawsuits filed by former NCAA players accusing EA and others of unauthorized use of player likenesses in their football and basketball games. EA settled the lawsuit for an undisclosed amount. The settlement is reported to be around $40 million, to be paid to between 200,000 and 300,000 players.

== Consumerist rating as "Worst Company in America" ==
In April 2012, Consumerist awarded EA with the title of "Worst Company in America" along with a ceremonial Golden Poo trophy. The record-breaking poll drew in more than 250,000 votes and saw EA beating out such regulars as AT&T and Walmart. The final round of voting pitted EA against Bank of America. EA won with 50,575 votes or 64.03%. This result came in the aftermath of the Mass Effect 3 ending controversy which several commentators viewed as a significant contribution to EA's win in the poll. Other explanations include use of day-one DLC and EA's habit of acquiring smaller developers to squash competition. EA spokesman John Reseburg responded to the poll by saying, "We're sure that bank presidents, oil, tobacco and weapons companies are all relieved they weren't on the list this year. We're going to continue making award-winning games and services played by more than 300 million people worldwide."

In April 2013, EA won Consumerist's poll for "Worst Company in America" a second time, consecutively, becoming the first company to do so. Games mentioned in the announcement included the critically controversial Mass Effect 3 for its ending, Dead Space 3 for its use of microtransactions, and the more recent SimCity reboot due to its poorly handled launch. Additionally, poor customer support, "nickel and diming", and public dismissiveness of criticisms were also given as explanations for the results of the poll. Consumerist summarized the results by asking, "When we live in an era marked by massive oil spills, faulty foreclosures by bad banks, and rampant consolidation in the airline and telecom industry, what does it say about EA’s business practices that so many people have—for the second year in a row—come out to hand it the title of Worst Company in America?"

When asked about the poll by VentureBeat, Frank Gibeau, President of EA Labels, responded "we take it seriously, and want to see it change. In the last few months, we have started making changes to the business practices that gamers clearly do not like." Gibeau attributed the elimination of online passes, the decision to make The Sims 4 a single-player, offline experience, as well as the unveiling of more new games to the shift in thinking. Gibeau added: "The point is we are listening, and we are changing."

== Loot boxes ==
A loot box is a type of microtransaction in video games, in which players can use in-game rewards or real-world funds to gain a virtual box filled with in-game items, the effects of which can vary. One approach used when creating loot boxes is to limit the system to only provide items that do not alter gameplay, such as visual customization options for characters. In contrast, another approach sees loot boxes dispense items that do alter gameplay. The latter style has drawn criticism from gamers and the wider public.

Loot boxes had gained popularity from developers and publishers around 2017, and Electronic Arts had included loot boxes or their equivalents in its games, such as FIFA 18 in its "FIFA Ultimate Team Mode", Mass Effect Andromeda, and Star Wars Battlefront II. EA's initial approach to loot boxes during Battlefront II's open beta period involved pay-to-win elements, with boxes containing powerful unlockable characters that otherwise would require hours of play to acquire through in game funds, in-game boosts only available through loot boxes, and other effects. Players complained about the pay-to-win aspects, leading EA to change what the Battlefront II loot boxes contained, including assuring all items could otherwise be earned through in-game means. The changes still allowed players that spent money on loot boxes to gain game-affecting elements at a faster rate than those trying to earn them in-game, leading to further criticism. Just prior to the game's full release in November 2017, Disney, which owns the Star Wars intellectual property, warned EA to disable the game's loot boxes until they could devise a non-pay-to-win system, fearing the loot box system could be seen as encouraging players, including children, into gambling.

In response to players who were angered by the way in which the Battlefront II progression system was set up, EA issued a statement on Reddit which stated, "The intent is to provide players with a sense of pride and accomplishment for unlocking different heroes. We selected initial values based upon data from the Open Beta and other adjustments made to milestone rewards before launch. Among other things, we're looking at average per-player credit earn rates on a daily basis, and we’ll be making constant adjustments to ensure that players have challenges that are compelling, rewarding, and of course attainable via gameplay." As of 2020, this is the most down-voted comment on Reddit, with over 668,000 downvotes. A day after the post on Reddit was made, a Twitter user, who claimed to be a developer at Electronic Arts, had reportedly received over 1,600 death threats due to Battlefront II, and the story was picked up by CNBC. However, the user's story was called into question after Jason Schreier, a lead writer at Kotaku, reached out to BiggSean66, the user who made the claims. After Schreier sent multiple messages and received no response from the user, BiggSean66 locked their Twitter account and removed any reference to being a developer from their Twitter bio. EA eventually reactivated the loot box system without any pay-to-win elements by March 2018, but the negative attention the game had drawn has impacted EA's financials. Blake Jorgensen stated that they missed Battlefront II's targeted sales by 10% due to the loot box controversy, and had missed their financial targets for the fiscal quarter after release due to the loot box system being offline for several months.

While Battlefront II was not the only game criticized for questionable loot box systems at this time, the attention it drew led several governments to evaluate the nature of loot box systems as potential gambling mechanisms. Both Belgium and the Netherlands issued rulings that loot boxes may be considered unregulated gambling and instructed developers and publishers of games they found out of compliance (including FIFA) to take corrective actions. In the case of Belgium, EA contested the ruling, asserting that the FIFA system was not in violation of gambling regulations, but eventually by January 2019 disabled the ability for Belgian players to purchase loot boxes in FIFA games to bring the game into compliance. In the United Kingdom, EA defended its use of loot boxes, comparing them to "surprise mechanics", akin to the collectable toys found in Kinder Surprise eggs, a statement criticized by the gaming press as downplaying the loot box issue.
