= BattleForge =

- Developer(s): EA Phenomic
- Publisher(s): Electronic Arts
- Platform(s): Microsoft Windows
- Release: NA: March 24, 2009; PAL: March 26, 2009; UK: March 27, 2009; Revival: December 18, 2020
- Genre(s): Real-time strategy
- Mode(s): Multiplayer

BattleForge is a discontinued video game developed by EA Phenomic and published by Electronic Arts in 2009. BattleForge is an online card-based real-time strategy (RTS) game. The game's servers were shut down on October 31, 2013. An unofficial full-revival of the game was released on December 18, 2020, under the name Skylords Reborn.

== History ==
Battleforge was developed by EA Phenomic and published Electronic Arts. It was released on Windows in March 2009 along with a demo. On May 26, 2009, BattleForge became a Play 4 Free game.

On September 4, 2013, EA announced the retirement of the game in an email to registered players, effective October 31, 2013.

=== Revival ===
In June 2015, a group started work on reverse engineering the game code to create a server for the game (Server emulator), called Skylords Reborn. The final game is free-to-play, like the original, but without micro-transactions. The server maintenance is funded by donations. As of the beginning of 2017 the development was in closed beta testing, and open stress tests began in September 2018.

The remake fully released with all features (including the 12 player maps) on December 18, 2020. The economy of the game was overhauled to make it no longer possible to buy battleforge points with money, as that would go against the agreement with EA. New faction boosters, a new promo (Snapjaws) and achievements were added, which were not available in the original game. As of February 2, 2021, the game has 90,160 registered accounts, with a record of ~5000 players online at a time.

The game already received multiple balance patches compared to the original game, and new content is actively being created by a team of volunteers, including brand new cards and features.

== Gameplay ==
On its initial release, the game revolved around trading, buying and winning through means of micro-transactions, though micro-transactions were not required for playing the game, only for buying new cards. When BattleForge became a Play 4 Free branded game with fewer cards initially available (32 cards and no points). The retail version came with all of the starter decks (One for each element, 64 cards) and 3,000 BattleForge points. The game's virtual currency was distributed to each player on a 2-point per day basis. Requirement was that the player has played at least 15 minutes that day. Through this, all micro-transactions were available to all players, but doing them without purchasing the retail version of the game or any virtual currency was possible, only slow.

There were a total of 383 cards available, almost equally divided between the powers of fire, frost, nature, and shadow. After an update, combinations of shadow/fire, frost/nature, frost/shadow and fire/nature were introduced, as well as legendary cards. Players could buy and sell cards at an in-game auction house, using BattleForge Points (BF Points), an in-game currency. Players could also invite each other to conduct a direct trade.

There was a PvE mode (player versus environment) and a PvP mode (player versus player). In the PvE mode, players could complete missions. Some of these missions could only be played by 1 player, while others could be played with 2, 4 or 12 players. There were three modes available in missions: standard, advanced and expert. In order to unlock advanced and expert modes, players would have to complete the series of missions on standard mode first. The rewards for the missions were gold, card upgrades and PvE experience points. These experience points would increase a player's PvE level.

For PvP, players could choose between ranked and unranked PvP. Unranked PvP would not give any rewards, but could be useful for testing cards and strategies or for a simple, friendly match. Ranked pvp would give players gold, Elo points and tokens as reward. Gold and tokens could be traded for card upgrades, while ELO points would increase a player's PvP level.

BattleForge supported DirectX 11's hardware tessellation feature on PC systems with DirectX 11 installed, which was subject to operating system and graphics card compatibility.

== Card editions ==
The Twilight edition was the first edition of BattleForge cards. Twilight edition of cards contained a total of two-hundred (200) unique cards, including fifty cards for each elemental faction: Fire, Frost, Nature, and Shadow. Each of these powers had its own special abilities, strengths and weaknesses. Each power was represented by an orb color in the game. The Twilight Edition consisted of 200 cards in total, i.e. 50 units, buildings and spells for each of these powers.

The Renegade Edition was the second edition of BattleForge cards. It expanded the BattleForge card set with legendary units and monumental buildings from the Southern Wastes region of Nyn. 60 new units and buildings were added to the BattleForge card pool.

The Lost Souls Edition was released on February 9, 2010, with a total of 60 brand new and unique units.

The Amii Edition was released in small proportions in each patch. About 4 cards got released in almost each patch. When the Amii Edition was fully released on April 26, 2012, the last 2 cards where added, bringing a total of 32 new cards to the game. The Amii Edition was the smallest edition but took the longest time to be released, using Sneak Preview Decks for 2 years prior to the actual release.

The Rebirth Edition was not in the original game, but contains the new cards being released through the revival Skylords Reborn. Every card created by the current team falls under this edition, including cards like Promo Snapjaws, Promo Mana Wing, Amii Palladins, Coat of Protection, and new bandit cards like Banzai Lord, Wasteland Terror, Minefield and Bandit Sniper. New cards are still being added to this edition.
