= SpellForce 2: Dragon Storm =

- Developer: Phenomic
- Publishers: EU: JoWooD; AU: Auran; NA: DreamCatcher Interactive
- Platforms: Windows XP, 2000
- Release: EU: 23 March 2007; AU: 30 April 2007; NA: 14 May 2007
- Genres: Real-time strategy, role-playing
- Modes: Single-player, multiplayer

SpellForce 2: Dragon Storm is a 2007 expansion pack developed by Phenomic for the real-time strategy and role-playing game SpellForce 2: Shadow Wars, released in 2006. The expansion features a new story campaign set after the events of the main game, in which players assume the role of an immortal warrior recruited into the Shaikan who finds themselves searching for one of its legendary members, only to discover a new threat that endangers the world of Eo. Along with the new story campaign and an additional skill tree for the main character, players can also build up a base and units based on a new Shaikan faction.

In addition to the campaign, the expansion included a Skirmish mode and a free play mode, the latter allowing players to explore the world without any quests to deal with. Dragon Storm received favourable reviews from critics, and was later bundled into an anniversary edition of Shadow Wars.

== Gameplay ==
SpellForce 2: Dragon Storm is played from a third-person perspective, in which players control a custom-made avatar to explore a variety of maps in the game. The expansion operates on the same real-time strategy and role-playing gameplay mechanics of SpellForce 2: Shadow Wars, but with significant new elements incorporated to the game.

For the role-playing elements, the expansion allows avatars to now earn skills within a new skill tree called Shaikan - these feature new abilities not included in the main game, while each skill has a link to a piece of equipment that a skill in another tree can unlock. The expansion's story campaign also allows players to begin with avatars starting at level ten, allowing them. For the real-time strategy elements, players can now control a new faction, the Shaikan, who feature their own selection units and structures, but have the added ability of Tech buildings that can offer an upgrade to units; though as a rule, each unit can only have one of two upgrades active at any one time – the other replaces the current upgrade should the player require it.

Alongside the story campaign, the expansion features a new Skirmish mode, which allows players to battle against the AI with one of the available factions in Dragon Storm, along with Freeplay and Multiplayer modes from the main game.

== Plot ==
=== Setting ===
SpellForce 2: Dragon Storm takes place on Eo – a high-fantasy world inhabited by several races, including humans, elves, dwarves and orcs – that was formed by the god Aonir, and originally consisted of large continents and various islands, with large oceans and seas. But after a cataclysmic event known as the Convocation shattered the world, the remaining landmass became islands, each held together around an obelisk called Aonir's Tower. While the islands float on an elemental sea that no ships can traverse, a powerful mage created a portal network to ensure the surviving inhabitants of Eo can remain connected to each other. However, since its creation, the network has begun to fall into decline, with portals slowly losing power, creating a rising fear that the islands will become isolated that has led to conflict between nations for resources.

Prior to the events of the expansion, Eo was once originally inhabited by an elven race known as the Shapers, who developed a connection to magic, including the powerful force known as the Archfire, which led to them creating a vast empire. However, the Shapers soon began to succumb to madness, from their connection to the Archfire, leading to Eo's dragons, who had remained in isolation up until then, to move in and eradicate the race before they could destroy the world. After this event, dragons remained the dominant force on Eo, until the eventual emergence of the other races that now inhabit the world forced them to return into isolation for their own safety.

The expansion's story takes place within the same inter-linked islands that formed the southern half of the continent of Fiara, but several years after the conclusion of the story in Shadow Wars; three of the main game's islands return with changes, while the expansion includes six new islands connected to its story. Players assume the role of the Shaper Conquer – a former Runewarrior turned Shaikan by the Soul Carrier, the hero of Shadow Wars – who initially works to protect the Realm from attacks due to the declining power of the portal network, but engages in a large quest to investigate a new threat slowly emerging from the chaos. Several characters from the main game reappear in the expansion's story, alongside new allies and enemies.

=== Synopsis ===
Several years after the events of SpellForce 2: Shadow Wars, the Shaikan, now freed of their lineage's curse, work as mercenaries for those who need it. With the portal network declining, leading to conflicts for resources, Satras, leader of the Shaikan, refuses to waste further efforts in aiding the Realm from being besieged. The Shaper Conqueror refuses to accept this, and continues to aid the Realm. While working to end the siege on the Realm's capital on Sevenskeep, they witness a mage named Riddengard attempting to convince the Realm's leader, King Ulf, into accepting the magical power of the Archfire and are shocked to discover that a friend of the Soul Carrier, Mordecay, is working with them. Before both depart, Mordecay cryptically instructs the Shaper Conqueror to find the Soul Carrier, who has gone missing in his absence.

Satras, angered by the Shaper Conqueror's defiance of his orders, casts them out from the Shaikan; Tor Halicos, sympathetic to their quest, secretly offers aid from Westguard when needed. Pursuing after the Soul Carrier, the Shaper Conqueror finds Riddengard attempting to block their efforts to reach a library in a flooded city called the Citadel, built by the Shapers – the first race of Eo. Needing aid, they gain the assistance of Nightsong, leader of the Pact, who had been pursuing after Riddengard out of concern for his power from the Archfire. Along the way, the Shaper Conqueror frees the demonic-infused judge Caine from Riddengard's control, and secures the aid of Yasha, daughter of the necromancer Hokan, for control of her soulless warriors called the Blades. With these forces, the Citadel is liberated from Riddengard's forces, while Mordecay is found to have been under their control much like Caine had been.

Thankful for his freedom, Mordecay reveals that Riddengard is working with a Shaper, one of two survivors who were in a magical stasis in the Citadel until the mage reawakened them. Concerned by this, the group continue to follow after the Soul Carrier to the Refuge, home to the dragons. To their surprise, the Shaper Conqueror and their friends find the Soul Carrier has become a dragon following a ritual, and works under the dragon Noradim. Both become deeply troubled that a Shaper has returned, whereupon the female Shaper awakens from her slumber, and explains their motive. She reveals the Shapers became mad due to their addiction to the power of the Archfire, and that her husband, whom Riddengard awoke first, is seeking to reconnect to this power, offering it to those vulnerable to it so that he can control them.

After an attack by the Shaper, which leads to Riddengard being killed by Caine, Noradim offers aid from the younger dragons in defending Westguard from the Shaper's wrath. Arriving in time, the Shaper Conqueror defends their home, receiving reinforcements from the Realm to push out the Shaper's troops led by the Blessed Ones – mages recruited by Riddengard and infused with the Archfire. Pursuing after the Shaper, the group find they have gone to enact their plan in Sevenskeep, and pursue after them. Fighting alongside Ulf, who seeks to liberate his home, the Shaper Conqueror discovers the Shaper's power makes them virtually invincible. Left with no choice, they absorb the power of the Archfire to combat them, at the cost of their life. Honoring their sacrifice, Noradim and the Soul Carrier revive the Shaper Conqueror, who becomes a dragon, and works alongside them to await the day the people of Eo can reconnect without the use of the portals.

== Reception ==
Darren Allen of Eurogamer rated the game a 6/10, calling it a palatable expansion that refines the sequel's focus on smaller battles and quality questing, even if it lacks major new additions.
