= Mass Effect 3 ending controversy =

Criticism directed at the ending of Mass Effect 3

An example of fan criticism directed at the perceived futility of choice between the original endings of Mass Effect 3

Mass Effect 3 is an action role-playing video game and the third installment of the Mass Effect video game series, developed by BioWare and published by Electronic Arts (EA), the first in the series to not be published by Microsoft Game Studios (MGS). Upon its release on March 6, 2012, for the PlayStation 3, Xbox 360, and Windows, Mass Effect 3 generated controversy when its ending was poorly received by players who felt that it did not meet their expectations. Criticisms included the ending rendering character choices inconsequential, a general lack of closure, plot holes, and narrative inconsistency.

On June 26, 2012, developers released an Extended Cut as downloadable content (DLC) intended to clarify the endings and remedy fan concerns. The initial announcement of the development of add-on content to amend the ending as well as the subsequent release of Extended Cut sparked debates over the treatment of video games as art and whether BioWare should have to alter their vision of the work in response to external pressure, regardless of its quality.

== Background ==
In the original Mass Effect trilogy, Commander Shepard, the customizable player character, leads allies from across the Milky Way galaxy in a struggle against a collective of powerful synthetic lifeforms called the Reapers, who systematically annihilate all sentient spacefaring life every 50,000 years. By the events of Mass Effect 3, the Reapers have arrived in the galaxy, and begin harvesting entire worlds. To stop them, Shepard must form an alliance between all of Mass Effect's alien races to build the Crucible, a megastructure-sized device capable of stopping the Reapers. It is built from blueprints designed by the civilizations from previous cycles, including the Protheans who successfully delayed the onset of the current cycle at the cost of their own near-extinction.

As Shepard, players dispatch a final "Marauder" enemy, entering a Reaper teleportation beam on Earth to reach the Citadel alongside their close ally and mentor, David Anderson, and begin the game's ending sequence. This follows a long and grueling battle in London where Shepard is gravely wounded by Harbinger, the leader of the Reapers. Once there, Shepard and Anderson engage in a dialog-based final showdown with the Illusive Man, the leader of Cerberus; only Shepard survives the confrontation. Shepard then attempts to fire the Crucible, only to be transported to the Citadel's pinnacle. They encounter the Catalyst, or "Star Child," the holographic avatar of the Reaper gestalt intelligence in the form of a boy Shepard had failed to rescue earlier in the game. The Catalyst reveals the Reapers' true motives, explaining that this repeated culling is intended as a form of preservation due to the supposed inevitability of organic life being rendered extinct by their own synthetic creations.

The Catalyst then presents up to three options for activating the Crucible, which will break the Reapers' galactic cycle of extinction:

- Destroy the Reapers at the cost of annihilating all synthetic life as collateral damage, including allies such as EDI and the Geth.
- Control the Reapers, with the caveat that Shepard will die and "lose everything they have" when their mind is uploaded to become the new Catalyst.
- Merge all organic and synthetic life via synthesis, resulting in both life forms achieving a "perfect understanding."

By making any of the above choices, Shepard activates the Crucible, which emits a wave of energy that spreads throughout the galaxy via the mass relays, destroying the mass relay network in the process. As the Normandy is hit by the wave of energy, it crashes on a remote planet.

== Development ==
Chris Hepler, one of the game's writers and the project's de facto "loremaster", explained in a 2021 interview that the final ending decision was both easier and had "much more project momentum", and that it was embraced by the project leads almost immediately, including its use of "space magic". The controversial aspects about the endings, such as Destroy ignoring the AI problem the Reapers aimed to prevent, Control rewarding the Reapers, and Synthesis violating the galaxy's bodily autonomy, were intentional in order to not make any of the choices perfectly moral or "right" for everyone. However, he also agreed that the game hinted at alternate endings that could have been used, and that a more hard science-based ending had been considered.

Concept scenarios for alternate endings that were discarded included the following:

=== Dark energy ===
The developers attempted to write a viable ending around the concept of dark energy and had considered a number of hypothetical theories surrounding it as the reason behind the creation of the Reapers: examples that were proposed by team members included curbing the use of dark energy by organic civilizations due to its cumulative entropic effect that would hasten the end of the universe, or preventing the universe's inevitable descent into a Big Crunch by focusing on organic species with biotic potential. The game was acknowledged to contain direct hints that the Citadel species and the Reapers would team up to stop a dark energy anomaly that threatened the universe with destruction, although this was not seriously discussed by the writers.

=== Cyclical ending ===
This ending scenario, shared by series concept artist Matt Rhodes on his personal website, envisions a villainous Shepard being confronted by either Ashley Williams or Kaidan Alenko, the survivor of the Virmire incident from the first game, after being willingly modified by Reaper technology. This is intended to echo the character arc and downfall of Saren Arterius in the first Mass Effect as a "cyclical twist".

=== Illusive Man boss fight ===
An endgame scenario which never progressed past the concept art stage would have the Illusive Man transform into a Reaper creature, not unlike Saren at the end of the first game, for a final boss fight.

=== Detonating mass relays as a trap for the Reapers ===
Former Mass Effect lead writer Drew Karpyshyn revealed in a July 2022 interview that a proposed ending which was under serious consideration by the team would involve the Reapers being lured through the mass relays, and the entire network is then detonated to wipe them out. Since every galactic community is isolated from each other as a result of the damaged relays, it would serve as the premise for a direct sequel which would have been the fourth main series installment.

=== Strong nuclear force ending ===
Hepler's preferred ending eschewed "space magic" entirely and involved the Crucible being a weapon that annihilated objects with a high atomic number, including the Reapers, their creations, such as the Husks (which were implied to be created with niobium cybernetics) and Commander Shepard themselves, an idea inspired by Probability Moon by Nancy Kress. However, the final ending was approved too quickly for Hepler to pitch his idea, and he was afraid of being sued for copying the idea without permission.

=== Reaper Queen ===
Shepard would discover a Reaper "Queen" that had been trapped somewhere within the Citadel and would then be prompted with three choices on how to deal with her. The choices offered by this discarded scenario ended up being similar in nature to the choices offered by the Catalyst in the final game's ending.

== Response ==
Although Mass Effect 3 launched in early March 2012 to a predominantly positive critical reception, its endings received a very poor reception from players. By mid-March 2012, a contingent of displeased fans had organized an internet campaign called "Retake Mass Effect" to demand a better ending to the game, part of which included a charity drive for the organization Child's Play. The drive raised $80,000 in less than two weeks before it was stopped. One fan made a complaint to the Federal Trade Commission, arguing that BioWare did not deliver on the promise of its game. Marjorie Stephens, Better Business Bureau director of marketplace services, alleged that the game falsely advertised the ability to completely shape the outcome. However, in June 2012, the UK Advertising Standards Authority ruled that, while disappointing, the endings were different enough to not be misleading to an actionable extent.

Opinions over the game's endings divided many critics. Among the criticisms include the ending rendering character choices inconsequential; a general lack of closure; lore contradictions and plot holes; character and narrative inconsistencies; the absence of a final boss battle; and inconsistencies between statements by BioWare staff during the game's development and the form the endings ultimately took. Commentators took note of the magnitude and scale of the public reaction and highlighted how invested the series had made its players. A widely discussed fan theory proposed that the endings were a hallucinated consequence of Shepard's gradual, forcible Reaper indoctrination over the course of the trilogy, also positing that the "Destroy" ending was purposely colored red to dissuade Shepard from picking it, and thus, overcoming the mind control. Dissatisfied fans also turned the final enemy unit encountered in combat into a sarcastic Internet meme called Marauder Shields.

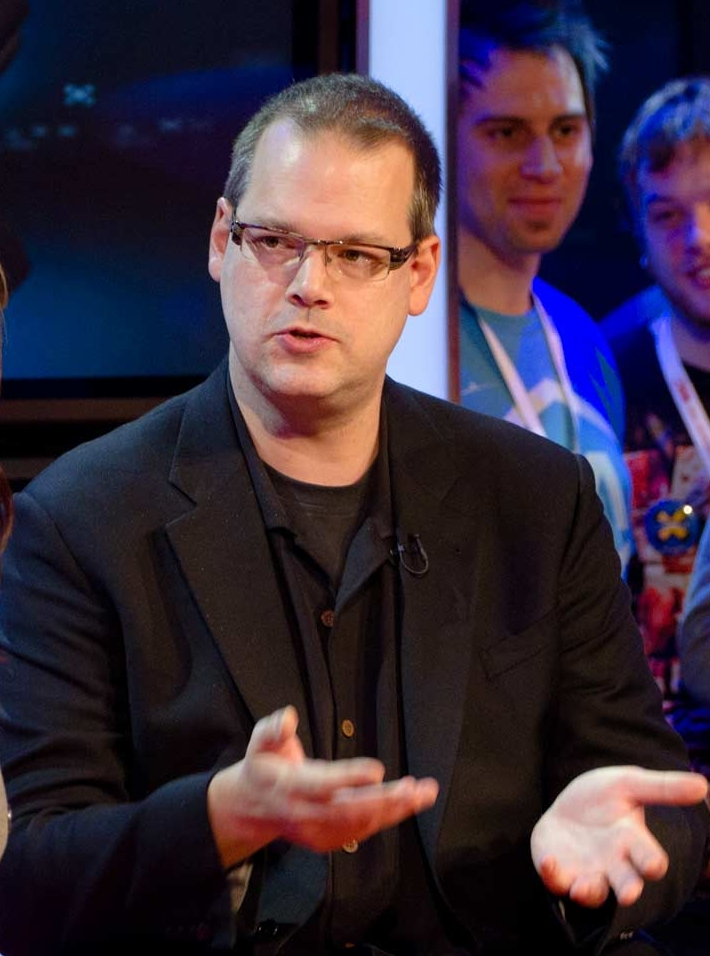
On March 21, 2012, Ray Muzyka published an open letter on the official BioWare blog in response to the controversy.

A number of individuals associated with Mass Effect 3, such as project director Casey Hudson and cast member Jessica Chobot, initially spoke out in support of the ending shortly after the game's launch. By March 16, 2012, Hudson and community coordinator Chris Priestly had acknowledged the growing controversy and provided assurances that the team were listening to feedback. Hudson later went on record and conceded that players ought to have more closure and answers for the creative direction they had taken. BioWare co-founder Ray Muzyka later announced that the company planned to address the criticism, with a further announcement to be made in April 2012. Chobot issued a public apology on a blog post dated April 2, 2012 following backlash from some players in response to her choice of tone and words.

BioWare announced a free downloadable content pack on April 5, 2012, that would expand upon the ending. Some commentators expressed concerns that changing the endings by giving into fan demand would compromise the developers' creative vision as well as the artistic integrity of their work, and ultimately sets a bad precedent for the development of creative works in the video game industry. Video game developer Ken Levine remarked that he felt sad that players were fervently calling for a revised Mass Effect 3 ending as they would be left "disappointed". Others like Stephen Totilo from Kotaku welcomed BioWare's decision to be open towards revising the ending to their work.

The expansion, Extended Cut, was released for most platforms on June 26, 2012. While not drastically changing the existing endings, it retconned various plot holes noted by fans, such as the complete destruction of the Mass Relays, and more thoroughly explained the Star Child's logic. Each ending was supplemented with additional cutscenes during the ending sequence, and a montage-based epilogue that depicts the aftermath of Shepard's actions, such as the fates of various supporting characters, alien species and entire worlds, all of which are variable based on prior narrative choices made by players along with their accumulated "Effective Military Strength" (EMS) score. Extended Cut also provides an additional choice for players to refuse the offer and have Shepard attack the Catalyst, which results in the Crucible not being activated and an inevitable Reaper victory over the current cycle of organics. Following the release of the Extended Cut pack, Mike Fahey from Kotaku observed that fan reaction was generally mixed, although certain individuals like the FTC complainant expressed satisfaction with the reworked ending sequences it introduced. Video game publications were similarly divided, with some critics such as Joe Juba of Game Informer describing the new additions as a "substantial improvement" over the original ending, while others such as Paul Tassi of Forbes felt it was "too little, far too late."

=== Indoctrination theory ===
A notable and widely circulated fan theory about the ending was that Shepard's mind had been infiltrated by the Reapers via "indoctrination", their method of technological brainwashing, due to repeated contact with them, starting when Shepard touched the Prothean Beacon on Eden Prime, an event that caused Shepard to have visions. It posits that the boy whose form is later taken by the Star Child is a hallucination that exists only in Shepard's mind, created to weaken their resolve. After being hit by Harbinger's beam, Shepard hallucinates the ending, which metaphorically represents whether they can resist the brainwashing. In the theory, "Control" and "Synthesis" represent futile indoctrinated beliefs, while only "Destroy" would free Shepard from the mind control and allow them to awaken.

Hepler denied that the ending was intended to be a hallucination, saying "we didn't write that", and that it was never discussed in staff meetings. While he agreed the ending was "trippy", he stated that it was entirely due to Shepard being on the verge of death. However, he expressed his approval of the theory, calling it "interesting", and supporting the idea of mods or fanfiction based on the topic.

== Aftermath ==
I remember about a week or so after we had launched [the game], we'd seen all these excellent critical reviews ... then all of a sudden people were saying, "I felt the ending was weak." And someone would say, "Yeah, I thought it was actually pretty bad." And someone else would say, "I hated that ending." It just snowballed like crazy, and pretty soon the whole issue was on fire.

— BioWare General Manager Aaryn Flynn in 2016

Retrospective discussions of Mass Effect 3 inevitably involve attention towards its ending. James Davenport of PC Gamer opined that the game's ending received an "inordinate" amount of criticism, which distracts players from the other positive or exemplary aspects of Mass Effect 3. Forbes contributor Erik Kain took the view that the public outcry and the subsequent response from BioWare and EA "may end up being a healthy one for the industry, opening a new chapter in gamer/developer/publisher relations", and called the release Extended Edition as a complementary expansion to the original endings a "remarkable" choice that made gamers realize "that they are entitled, and that it isn't a bad thing, to quality games". In 2018, Lucy O'Brien from IGN concurred and remarked that fan-driven internet campaigns like "Retake Mass Effect" have contributed to a paradigm shift in how consumers influence video game developers. With the inclusion of Mass Effect 3 and its DLC content into the Mass Effect Legendary Edition compilation released in 2021, BioWare staff are hopeful that following the passage of time and the release of Legendary Edition, players would reassess their opinion about the ending as the culmination of the trilogy's overarching story arc.

In the absence of significant official changes to the ending, fans released various mods to change the ending into a more satisfying one. One such mod, Priority: Earth Overhaul, makes wide-ranging changes to the main game and its final mission, such as adding new cutscenes and letting the player fight alongside the geth. Another, the Happy Ending Mod by Audemus, removes controversial aspects of the ending such as the Star Child sequence and destruction of the Mass Relays, adding the Star Child's exposition to the Codex. "Destroy" is made the sole ending, but its drawbacks, such as all AI being destroyed and Shepard's possible death, are removed. Having been released for the original game, it was also released for Legendary Edition in 2022. The mod is also compatible with Citadel Epilogue Mod, which repurposes the Citadel DLC as an epilogue set a year after Mass Effect 3.

The backlash to Mass Effect 3's ending was suggested as having a significant impact on EA being named Consumerist's 2012 and 2013 Worst Company in America.

== See also ==
- Criticism of Electronic Arts
