= SpellForce: The Order of Dawn =

2003 video game

- Developer: Phenomic Game Development
- Publisher: Encore, Inc. (The Order of Dawn); JoWooD (The Breath of Winter, Shadow of the Phoenix (Europe), Gold Edition); Aspyr Media, Inc. (Platinum Edition); Dreamcatcher Interactive (SpellForce Universe): AU: Auran
- Composer: Dynamedion
- Series: SpellForce
- Platform: Microsoft Windows
- Release: The Order of Dawn: EU: 28 November 2003; NA: 11 February 2004; The Breath of Winter: EU: 25 June 2004; NA: 2005; Shadow of the Phoenix: EU: 12 November 2004; NA: 2005; Other: NA: 15 October 2007 (SpellForce Universe)
- Genres: Real-time strategy, role-playing
- Modes: Single-player, multiplayer

SpellForce: The Order of Dawn is a 2003 real-time strategy and role-playing video game, developed by Phenomic Game Development and published by Encore, Inc for Microsoft Windows. First released in Europe on November 11, 2003, the game takes place within a high-fantasy world in the years following a devastating cataclysmic event, with the game's main campaign focusing on the plight of an immortal warrior who seeks to investigate growing troubles amongst some of the islands that have formed.

The game combines traditional role-playing elements such as taking on quests, equipping characters and improving them with levelling up, alongside real-time strategy elements that focus on gathering resources to construct bases and train an army of units to help in defeating opposing forces, with the game featuring a selection of factions to control. Alongside the game's story campaign, players can also engage in skirmish battles using any faction against the AI, and multiplayer matches against online opponents.

Order of Dawn received favourable reviews from critics for its style of gameplay and its graphics, though with criticism for the voice-acting and plot choices for players. Despite this, the game proved popular and went on to form the SpellForce series, with Order of Dawn receiving two expansions under JoWooD Productions that featured stand-alone stories and new features: SpellForce: The Breath of Winter in June 2004, and SpellForce: Shadow of the Phoenix in November that same year. Two sequels were later released: SpellForce 2: Shadow Wars in 2006 and SpellForce 3 in 2017.

== Gameplay ==
SpellForce: Order of Dawn is played from a third-person perspective, in which players control a custom-made avatar to explore a variety of maps in the game. The game makes use of traditional elements from both real-time strategy and role-playing video games, in which players take on various quests, kill monsters and earn experience to level up and improve skills and unlock the ability to wield new equipment, while at times having to build bases, gathering resources for the construction of buildings, and training units to fight against opposing armies.

For the role-playing aspect of the game, players create an avatar for interaction with the game's world, defining them with a player's preferred stat points to begin with, and focused on one of three classes: fighter; archer; and magician. Each class focuses on a particular aspect of combat, with avatars learning skills to unlock new abilities for use in combat, as well as to unlock the ability to use equipment related to the skill - for example, improving their skill in ranged combat unlocks new long-range weapons for use. Equipment confers bonuses to various stats, and are divided between weapons, shields, armour, and accessories, with the player able to come across new equipment with better stats as they progress in the main campaign. Characters level up by completing quests and defeating monsters - a unique system awards more experience for defeating higher level creatures than those below a characters level, and less for repeated killing of the same creature. Quests are divided into main quests that progress the game's story, and side quests that offer bonuses such as new equipment.

For the real-time strategy aspect of the game, players work to build up bases, gathering resources to build structures and train units, with the ability of forming groups to help with taking on opposing bases. In Order of Dawn the game features two opposing factions with three different races: the Light Side, featuring humans, dwarves, and elves; and the Dark Side, featuring orcs, trolls, and dark elves. Each race has its own troops and structures that can be used, including a unique unit called a "Titan", each with its own cost and requiring specific resources to be spent to build/train them – wood, stone, iron, moonsilver, aria, lenya, and food. Each base has a set of different buildings to use, some of which need to be upgraded to access stronger units for each race: Military structures to train units; Gathering structures help with gathering specific resources; Tech structures for upgrades; and defensive towers for protecting the player's base from attack.

In the game's story campaign, players visit various inter-linked islands, each of which feature a set of main quests to complete and require making use of portals to move between them; portals cannot be used when the player engages in an island's main story, until its series of main quests are completed. During the course of the game, the avatar can equip special "runestones" to call forth "Runewarrior" allies - each with their own skill set and class, but set to being lower in level than the avatar's own; they will still level up alongside them. Although the game can be over if the avatar and their allies are killed, players can activate a monument called a "Bindstone", which re-spawns such characters upon their death.

Alongside the story campaign, players can engage in three other modes: Freeplay, which allows players to explore the campaign's world without any quests to deal with; Skirmish, which allows players to engage in RTS matches against an AI; and Multiplayer, which allows players to compete against others online.

== Plot ==
=== Setting ===
SpellForce: The Order of Dawn takes place on Eo – a high-fantasy world inhabited by several races, including humans, elves, dwarves and orcs – that was formed by the god Aonir, and originally consisted of large continents and various islands, with large oceans and seas. Many of the races developed an interest in magic as civilizations grew and nations were formed, with thirteen of the most powerful mages forming a group known as "The Circle". However, a lust for power by its members resulted in a war between them, eventually to gain control on a ritual called the Convocation they believed would grant any one of them control over the elemental forces that Aonir used to form Eo.

Unfortunately, the war came to an end when one of the Circle, known only as "The Dark One", completed the ritual, but could not control the power of the elementals. The Convocation invoked a cataclysmic event that shattered Eo's landmasses, killing most of the Circle in the process. Fortunately, obelisks known as Aonir's Towers helped to keep most of the landmass intact as islands, but with them floating on an elemental sea that no ship can traverse. A Circle mage named Rohen Tahir, who survived the Convocation, spent the years after the disaster working to reconnect the islands to each other through a specialised portal network, ensuring the races of Eo could remain in contact with each other.

The game's story takes place eight years after the Convocation, set within a series of inter-linked islands that used to be part of the northern regions of the continent of Fiara. Players assume the role of a Runewarrior – one of several immortal beings made from the souls of powerful warriors and magic users, whom the Circle created to lead their armies in their war. Freed by Rohen to investigate troubles in the region, the Runewarrior works on resolving these issues with the aid of fellow Runewarriors.

=== Synopsis ===
During the final days of the Convocation War between the Circle mages, the mage Rohen Tahir attempts to stop the Dark One, a Circle mage, from invoking the Convocation ritual. Unfortunately, Rohen fails, and the ritual doesn't grant the Dark One the power he seeks but instead unleashes powerful elementals that shatter Eo. In the aftermath, Rohen forms a portal network to keep the people of Eo connected. Eight years later, Rohen receives a rune from the war, allowing him to summon one of the Circle's Runewarriors and granting them freedom. In exchange, he asks the Runewarrior to go to the city of Greyfell and contact the leader of the Order of Dawn, who requires help. Shortly after, Rohen departs to investigate reports of strange black steel creatures, but the Dark One ambushes the Runewarrior, intending to stop them. Escaping the ambush, the Runewarrior discovers Rohen is heading into a trap and forms an alliance with the Order to prevent this.

As the Runewarrior helps the Order to stop attacks by armies of mercenaries and orcs across several islands in the region, they learn more about the Dark One's plans. Eventually, the Runewarrior catches up to Rohen and warns him. Surprised by the Dark One's schemes, Rohen gives the Runewarrior the Book of Convocation, which details the ritual, and instructs them to find and assist Hokan Ashir, another Circle mage who survived the Convocation. Despite the warning, Rohen triggers the Dark One's trap and is killed. The Dark One gloats that a war is coming and seals off the route to his base with the black steel creatures Rohen was investigating. Seeking out Hokan, a necromancer, the Runewarrior learns that these creatures, called the Iron Ones, were originally Hokan's creation, used to combat a rival's demon army. Hokan, who no longer controls them, reveals that the Dark One can only be defeated with a Phoenix Stone, an artifact capable of vanquishing a Circle mage.

Using Hokan's information, the Runewarrior sets out to find the Phoenix Stone. They discover that the Order sacrificed several members to defeat the Iron Ones and break through their barricade. Undeterred, the Runewarrior continues to pursue the Dark One but is ambushed and robbed of both the Book of Convocation and the Phoenix Stone. Eventually, they reach the Dark One's base, destroy it, and confront the Circle mage. To their shock, they discover that the Dark One is actually a younger version of Rohen, who used time travel to escape dying in the Convocation and has been seeking the Book and Stone to attempt the ritual again.

The young Rohen explains his plan to travel back in time, before the Convocation, to successfully complete the ritual. In the ending cutscenes, the young Rohen proceeds into the past and studies the book. Over time, he realizes the ritual was a lie and only brought destruction. Remorseful, he attempts to prevent the events from unfolding as they did, knowing his younger self was misguided. Unaware that history will repeat itself, he effectively ends the Circle's madness, creating a time loop that ensures the cycle continues and ultimately brings about the end of the Circle's destructive ambitions for good.

Meanwhile, the Runewarrior, now armed with the knowledge of the time loop and the true nature of the Convocation ritual, works with the Order to prepare for the eventual return of the young Rohen. Together, they set plans in motion to break the cycle once and for all, hoping to finally bring peace and stability to the shattered lands of Eo.

== Reception ==
Reception

Aggregate scores
Aggregator	Score
GameRankings	74.24%
Metacritic	74/100

Review scores
Publication	Score
GameSpot	7.9/10
GameSpy	3/5
IGN	8.2/10

In the German market, SpellForce sold above 100,000 units by early 2004.

Andrew Park from GameSpot said in his review of the game: ‘SpellForce's unique combination of role-playing and strategy elements makes it worth a look for fans of either kind of game.’ However he said about the voice-over ‘some of it is decent, though the rest is fairly bad.’ The game scores a 7.4 based on 24 reviews by GameSpot for Metacritic. GameSpot later named it the best computer game of February 2004.

In the review of Dan Adams of IGN the gameplay and graphics of the game were praised. However he said about the voice acting that it was some of the worst he had heard in a while. He gave the game an overall score of 8.2 out of 10.

Alex Tsotsos from GameSpy said about the game that as a single-player game, SpellForce shines. However he said the game lacked ‘the plotline choices that mark the best RPGs.’ He also criticized the enemy AI and gave the game a score of 3 out of 5 stars.

=== Awards ===
SpellForce and its expansion packs have been awarded with several awards at the Deutscher Entwicklerpreis:

Year	Placing	Category	Title
2004	1st	Best soundtrack and in-game sound	SpellForce - Breath of Winter
2004	1st	Best cutscenes	SpellForce - Breath of Winter
2004	2nd	Best cutscenes	SpellForce - The Order of Dawn
2004	2nd	Best interface	SpellForce - Breath of Winter
2004	2nd	Best graphics	SpellForce - Breath of Winter
2004	3rd	Best mid-price game	SpellForce - Breath of Winter
2005	2nd	Best level and game design	SpellForce - Shadow of the Phoenix
2005	2nd	Best role-playing/adventure game	SpellForce - Shadow of the Phoenix
2005	3rd	Best soundtrack and in-game sound	SpellForce - Shadow of the Phoenix
2005	3rd	Best story/lore	SpellForce - Shadow of the Phoenix

== Expansions ==
=== Breath of Winter ===
The first expansion, Breath of Winter, was released on June 25, 2004, and focused on a new story that takes place after the events of The Order of Dawn. In this expansions, players assume the role of a Runewarrior who is summoned by the leaders of a group of refugees to provide them assistance. However, events soon descend into chaos when the group find themselves working alongside a race of ice-elves to prevent a powerful entity reviving two dark gods that could plunge Eo into darkness. Alongside the new campaign and the enemies it introduces, the expansion brought several improvements to the original gameplay, including new items and spells for use in all game modes.

=== Shadow of the Phoenix ===
The second expansion, Shadow of the Phoenix, was released on November 12, 2004, and focused on a story that takes place after the events of Breath of Winter. In this story, players assume the role of a Runewarrior who is summoned to help stop the madness of the necromancer Hokan, who has come back to life thanks to the events in The Order of Dawn. They soon find themselves on a quest to stop Hokan achieving unimaginable power that could make them a god, finding themselves dealing the resurrected souls of the mages of Circle in the process. The expansion features a more difficult campaign aimed for characters who are above level 28 - while players can choose to play as pre-defined avatars, they may also import those created for The Order of Dawn or Breath of Winter, but only if they are above the minimum level requirement for the expansion. In addition to this, the expansion also introduced two new types of units for the playable races, new maps for Freeplay and multiplayer modes, and allows players to choose whether to use the original PvP game rules, or those of Shadow of the Phoenix, though they may not engage players using the other set as a result.
