= EA Phenomic =

German video game developer (1997–2013)

- Type: Subsidiary
- Industry: Video game development
- Founded: 1997; 29 years ago
- Founder: Volker Wertich
- Defunct: 2013
- Fate: Dissolved
- Headquarters: Ingelheim, Germany
- Key people: Dirk Ringe (CEO)
- Products: Video games
- Owner: Electronic Arts
- Number of employees: 60
- Parent: Electronic Arts (2006–2013)
- Website: www.phenomic.de

EA Phenomic was a real-time strategy video game developer, headquartered in Ingelheim, Germany, and founded as Phenomic Game Development in 1997 by Volker Wertich, who had previously worked for Blue Byte and developed The Settlers and The Settlers III. The studio was acquired by Electronic Arts on 23 August 2006 and renamed as EA Phenomic. Electronic Arts announced that EA Phenomic would concentrate on developing real-time strategy video games. In July 2013, EA closed the studio and laid off the 60 employees.

== Games developed ==
Year	Title	Platform(s)
As Phenomic Game Development
2004	SpellForce: The Order of Dawn	Microsoft Windows
2006	SpellForce 2: Shadow Wars	Microsoft Windows
As EA Phenomic
2009	BattleForge	Microsoft Windows
2010	Lord of Ultima	Browser
2012	Command & Conquer: Tiberium Alliances	Browser
