= Hovercar =

Unrealized concept of a flying personal vehicle

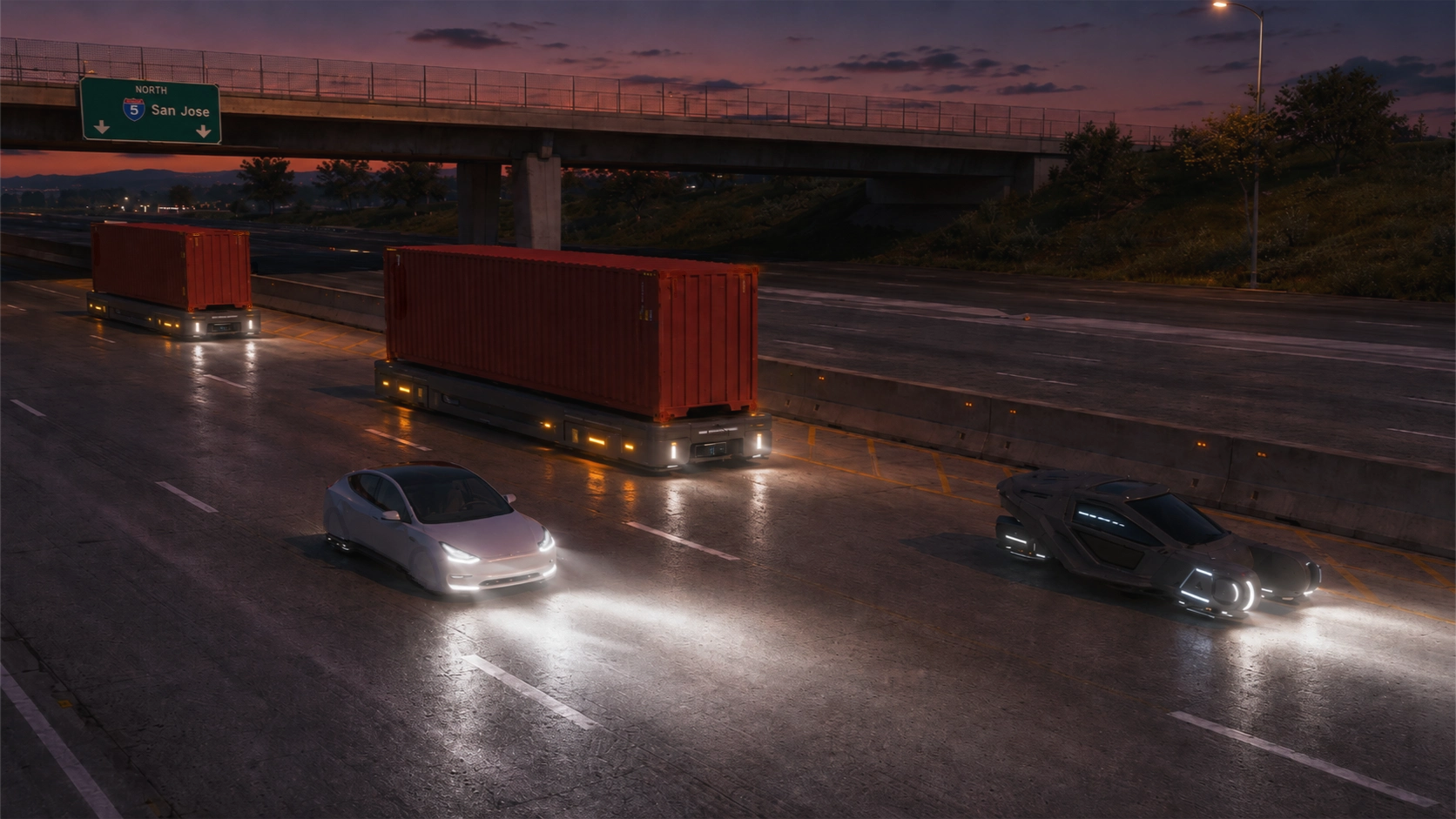
CGI mockup of a hypothetical maglev hover car based on the Tesla Model X and Spinner (Blade Runner)

A hover car is a personal vehicle that flies at a constant altitude of 30 to 90 cm (1 to 3 ft) above the ground and used for personal transportation in the same way a modern automobile is employed. The concept usually appears in science fiction and many futuristic movies.

In science fiction, it is capable of elevating itself some distance from the ground through some repulsion technology, presumably exploiting some short range anti-gravity principle so as to eliminate most friction forces which act against conventional vehicles. Other works feature vehicles that hover by having magnetic plates lined along roads, operating in a similar principle to maglev. The capability of hovering above the ground eliminates the need for tires, and unlike an air-cushion vehicle, it does not produce a dust cloud.

The closest devices are the hovercraft, which elevates itself above a water or level hard surface using a cushion of air retained by a flexible skirt, and the hovertrain, which is a type of high-speed train that replaces conventional steel wheels with hovercraft lift pads, and the conventional railway bed with a paved road-like surface, known as the "track" or "guideway".

== Efforts to build air-cushion hover cars ==
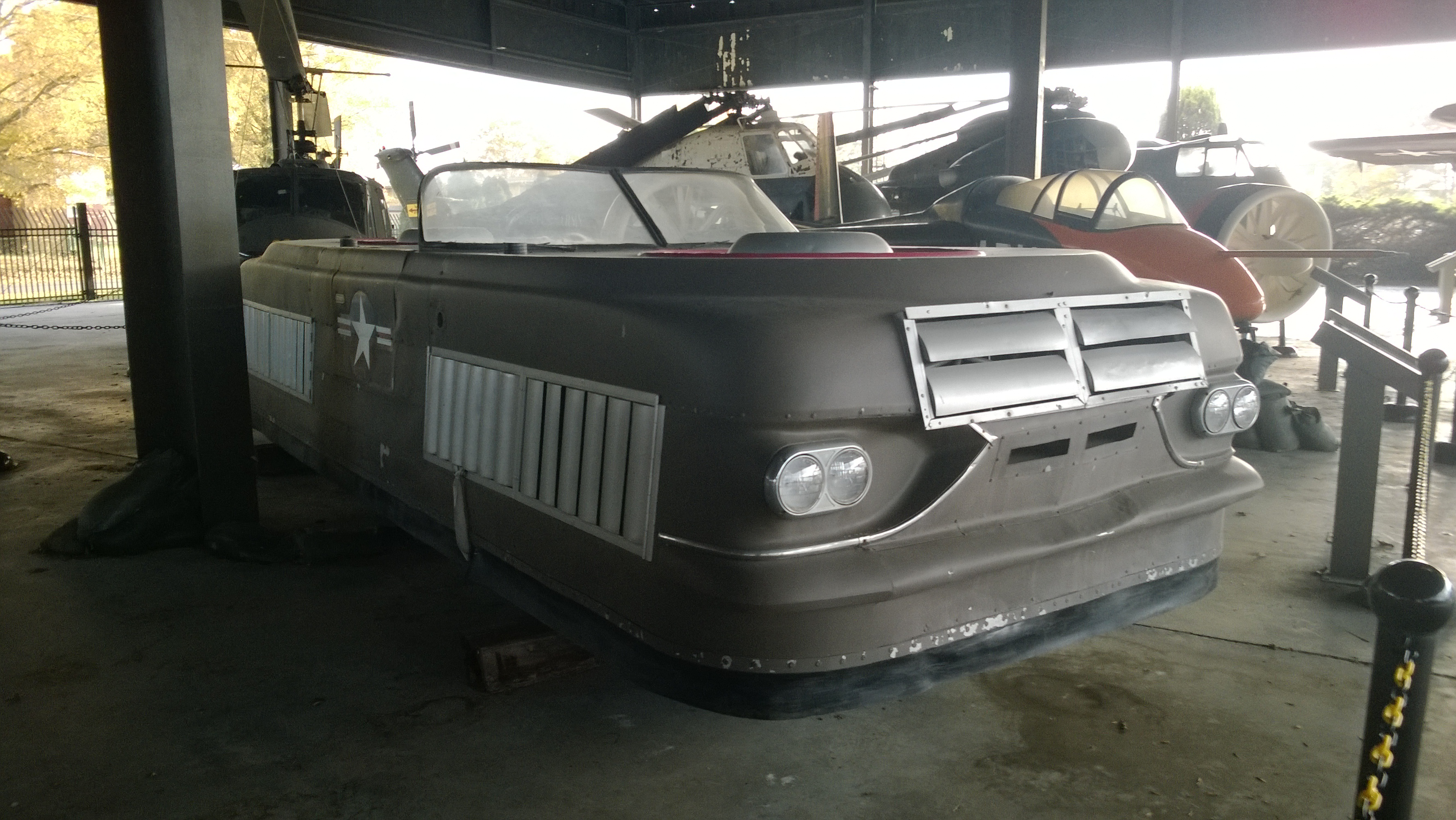
Curtiss-Wright Model 2500 Air Car, late 1950s

Air-cushion hover cars are hovercraft.

In April 1958, Ford engineers demonstrated the Glide-air, a 1-metre (3 ft) model of a wheelless vehicle that speeds on a thin film of air only 76.2 μm (3/1000 inch) above its table top roadbed. An article in Modern Mechanix quoted Andrew A. Kucher, Ford's vice president in charge of Engineering and Research noting "We look upon Glide-air as a new form of high-speed land transportation, probably in the field of rail surface travel, for fast trips of distances of up to about 1,000 miles [1,600 km]".

In 1959, Ford displayed a hovercraft concept car, the Ford Levacar Mach I.

In August 1961, Popular Science reported on the Aeromobile 35B, an air-cushion vehicle (ACV) invented by William Bertelsen and envisioned as revolutionising the transportation system through personal hovering self-driving cars capable of reaching speeds of up to 2,400 km/h (1,500 mph). The second version was powered by a 200-horsepower (150 kW) engine that consumed 36 L/h (9.5 gallons per hour).

== In popular culture ==
=== In comics ===
- Dragon Ball
- The Trigan Empire

=== In film and television ===
- The Adventures of Jimmy Neutron, Boy Genius
- A.I. Artificial Intelligence
- Altered Carbon
- Back to the Future Part II
- Batman Beyond (including the Batmobile)
- Blade Runner (as spinners)
- The Fifth Element
- Futurama
- Grand Theft Auto Online
- Hello Tomorrow!
- I, Robot
- The Jetsons
- Immortal (unique type of hovercar, which is powered by overhead wires)
- Lilo & Stitch
- Marvel Cinematic Universe
  - Agents of S.H.I.E.L.D.
  - The Fantastic Four: First Steps
- Minority Report
- Space Precinct (as hoppers)
- Phineas and Ferb
- Robot Jox
- Stand by Me Doraemon
- Star Trek (as desert flyers and skimmers; the first being Vulcan hovercars)
- Star Wars (as airflow cars, grav-cars, hauler cars, hover cars, landspeeders, and trundle cars)
- Supercar
- Tomorrowland
- Total Recall

=== In literature ===
- Hover Car Racer

=== In video games ===
- Hover Ace
- Aircar
- AirCars
- Beam Breakers
- BHunter
- Blade Runner (as spinners)
- Cloudpunk (as HOVAs)
- Does Not Commute
- F-Zero
- Fallout
- Hover!
- Jak II
- Nikopol: Secrets of the Immortals
- NYR: New York Race (containing hovercars from The Fifth Element)
- Overwatch
- Quarantine and its sequel Quarantine II: Road Warrior
- Redout
- ReVOLUTION
- Rock n' Roll Racing
- Saints Row IV
- Space Quest I
- Teraburst
- Terra Nova: Strike Force Centauri
- TimeSplitters
- Tunnel B1
- Wipeout

== See also ==
=== Similar concepts ===
- Aero-X
- Flying car
- Flying platform
- Ground-effect vehicle
- Personal air vehicle
- Power trowel
- Maglev
- EVTOL

=== Hover vehicles ===
- Hoverbike
- Hoverboard
- Hovercraft
- Hovertrain
