= They Stole a Million =

1986 video game

- They Stole a Million screen shot
- Developer: Tigress Marketing
- Publisher: 39 Steps
- Composer: Ben Daglish
- Platforms: Amstrad CPC; Commodore 64; ZX Spectrum
- Release: NA: 1986; EU: 1986
- Genre: Strategy
- Mode: Single-player

They Stole a Million is a strategy computer game released by Ariolasoft in 1986. The objective of the game is to plan robberies and execute the crime. The player first purchases blueprints of the house where the soon-to-be-stolen object is kept. Then several specialists can be hired which disable alarms, open locks or drive the getaway car.

The planning stage allows the player to set waypoints, actions, and the times at which the actions should take place. For example, the alarm specialist needs two minutes to disable the alarm for a certain display. After two minutes, the lock picking master opens the display and takes the loot.

== Reception ==
Reception

Review scores
Publication	Score
Amstrad Action	88%
Sinclair User	4/5
Zzap!64	90%

They Stole a Million received generally positive reception from video game critics. It received a Your Sinclair Megagame award.

== Legacy ==
A remake based on the IP was created under the name Der Clou! (The Clue!), followed by a sequel, The Sting!, from the developer's house that was known at the time as Neo Software. They would go on to be assimilated into the Rockstar Games umbrella of developers.
