= Council Wars (disambiguation) =

Council Wars was a racially polarized political war in the city of Chicago from 1983 to 1986.

Council Wars may also refer to:

- Dark Colony: The Council Wars, an expansion pack to the 1997 video game, Dark Colony
- The Council Wars, an in-progress book series by John Ringo
