= Rockstar London =

British video game developer

Rockstar London Limited
- Type: Subsidiary
- Industry: Video games
- Founded: November 2005; 21 years ago
- Founder: Mark Washbrook
- Headquarters: London, England
- Products: Manhunt 2
- Parent: Rockstar Games

Rockstar London Limited is a British video game developer and a studio of Rockstar Games based in London. Mark Washbrook established the company in November 2005 within Rockstar Games' European publishing offices. The studio's first game was Manhunt 2, which it took over from Rockstar Vienna after that studio was shut down in May 2006. Rockstar London later developed Midnight Club: L.A. Remix and co-led the development of Max Payne 3. Washbrook left the company in January 2011.

== History ==
Mark Washbrook established Rockstar London for publisher Rockstar Games "from scratch". The setup was in progress by November 2005 at Rockstar Games' European publishing headquarters, then also known as Rockstar London, on King's Road in London. Washbrook assumed the role of studio head. After Rockstar Vienna was shut down in May 2006, Rockstar London was tasked with completing the former's Manhunt 2. The game was announced as Rockstar London's debut title in February 2007 and released that October. It developed Midnight Club: L.A. Remix, a PlayStation Portable adaptation of Midnight Club: Los Angeles, which was released in October 2008.

In January 2011, Washbrook announced his resignation. His departure coincided with that of Mark Lloyd, the studio head of Rockstar Lincoln. Rockstar Games stated that neither departure would affect the studios' active projects. Washbrook went on to work for Sony Computer Entertainment Europe and, alongside Lloyd, joined Activision's mobile-focused Activision Leeds studio in May 2012. Rockstar London was one of four studios—alongside Rockstar New England, Rockstar Toronto, and Rockstar Vancouver—leading the development of Max Payne 3, released in 2012. The studio worked alongside all other Rockstar Games studios on Red Dead Redemption 2, which was released in October 2018.

== Accolades ==
Rockstar London was a finalist for the "Best New UK/European Studio" award at the 2008 Develop Industry Excellence Awards.

== Games developed ==
List of games developed by Rockstar London
Year	Title	Platform(s)	Publisher(s)	Notes
2007	Manhunt 2	PlayStation 2, PlayStation Portable, Wii, Windows	Rockstar Games	
2008	Midnight Club: L.A. Remix	PlayStation Portable	Rockstar Games	
2012	Max Payne 3	macOS, PlayStation 3, Windows, Xbox 360	Rockstar Games	Developed as part of Rockstar Studios
2013	Grand Theft Auto V	PlayStation 3, PlayStation 4, PlayStation 5, Windows, Xbox 360, Xbox One, Xbox Series X/S	Rockstar Games	Supportive development for Rockstar North
2018	Red Dead Redemption 2	PlayStation 4, Stadia, Windows, Xbox One	Rockstar Games	
2026	Grand Theft Auto VI	PlayStation 5, Xbox Series X/S	Rockstar Games	
