= The Clue! =

1994 video game

Der Clou!
- German box art
- Developer: Neo Software
- Publisher: Kompart UK
- Designer: Helmut Gaberschek
- Programmer: Kaweh Kazemi
- Platforms: MS-DOS, Amiga, CD32
- Release: 1994
- Genre: Adventure

The Clue! (known as Der Clou! in German-speaking regions) is a 1994 adventure game inspired by the 1986 game They Stole a Million. The player is tasked with finding accomplices, scouting potential targets, and plotting a burglary. The game uses a point-and-click interface. A sequel followed in 2001: The Sting! (or Der Clou 2!.)

In 2000 the source code was released to the public. The game was since then ported to modern platforms (Windows, Linux and Web) via SDL and receives still updates by the game's community (2015).

== Gameplay ==
Planning a robbery

The gameplay is composed of two different modes. Most of the time, the player is travelling around the city of London and talking with people via a point-and-click interface like in classical adventure games, while more strategy-like top-down perspective is used for the actual planning of the heists.

The adventure mode uses static graphics depicting various places with menu interface to control Matt's actions. It is in this mode, where the player buys and sells cars, tools and other equipment needed for thievery, recruits accomplices and scouts for possible target buildings. Every important information as an amount of money, description of tools, cars, loot, etc. can be accessed anytime through the Think menu. Before committing a burglary, the player must collect all the necessary information by investigation of the site. A car and at least one associate with driving skills is also obligatory.

After these conditions have been fulfilled, the player can switch the game into the planning mode by selecting the option Planning in the hotel room. There he chooses the escape car, accomplices and the driver. In the final stage of planning, the player controls movement of the thieves by the keyboard and works out the details of the plan in real-time like simulation.

The loot from successful coup must be sold to one of the three available dealers in order to earn money. Each dealer is specialized in different commodities and will not accept or will pay less for other types of merchandise.

Essential part of the gameplay are skills such as driving, lockpicking or electronics, which affects the time needed to complete specific tasks. Some actions and tools depend on particular skill level of person doing it (for example using stethoscope for opening a safe lock requires higher skill level than using a welding torch for the same job). Participants of a successful burglary also improve their skills. In addition to skills, each character has various personal traits as dexterity, loyalty, greed or nerves. These traits affect things like proportion of share from the loot, how many trails the person leaves on the crime scene or if he/she betrays his/her associates when captured by the police.

== Plot ==
A conversation with one of the characters

The Clue! is set in 1953 in the streets of London and its countryside. Actual historical locations and buildings are used, such as Victoria station and Karl Marx's Tomb at Highgate Cemetery, along with some fictional ones.

The player character is Matt Stuvysant, a young criminal wanna-be getting immersed into the world of London underworld. He can make social contacts with other characters in various pubs and bars. Most of the NPCs can be hired to assist in burglary.

The story begins with Matt Stuvysant arriving at London Victoria station. Shortly after he is settled in the Ugly Dog hotel on Holland Street, he is contacted by his father's old friend Herbert Briggs, a well-renowned burglar.
