= Rent-a-Hero (1998 video game) =

- British box cover
- Developer: Neo Software
- Publishers: GER: Magic Bytes; EU: THQ; NA: SouthPeak Interactive
- Director: Hannes Seifert
- Platform: Windows
- Release: EU: November 1998; NA: June 30, 2000
- Genre: Graphic adventure
- Mode: Single player

Rent-a-Hero is a graphic adventure game developed by the Austrian studio Neo Software (later Rockstar Vienna) and published by Magic Bytes in 1998, and by SouthPeak Interactive in 2000.

== Gameplay ==
Rent-a-Hero is an adventure game controlled with a point-and-click interface.

== Story ==
Rent-a-Hero is set in a fantasy world on the island of Tol Andar. Its protagonist, Rodrigo, is a professional "hero for hire" who undertakes quests for a price. He struggles to compete with Tol Andar's many other mercenary heroes. When Rodrigo's rivals are called away to help combat a pirate invasion, he receives the job of finding Jasmin, wife of a dwarf named Ramil.

== Development ==
Rent-a-Hero was first released in the German market during November 1998. An English version was finished in the third quarter of 1999, and was released by THQ in the United Kingdom that July. The game's North American distribution rights were acquired from THQ by publisher SouthPeak Interactive by September 1999. Initially due in January 2000, SouthPeak's North American release of Rent-a-Hero was ultimately canceled in March 2000.

== Reception ==
=== German-language press ===
Reception

Review scores
Publication	Score
PC Action	82%
PC Games	84%
PC Player	72/100

=== International reviews ===
Reception

Review scores
Publication	Score
Adventure Gamers	2.5/5
Just Adventure	A
CNET Gamecenter	3/10
MeriStation	7.0/10

== See also ==
- Deponia
- House of Tales
