= Mutation of J.B. =

1996 video game

- Developer(s): Invention
- Publisher(s): Riki Computer Games
- Platform(s): MS-DOS
- Release: 1996
- Genre(s): Adventure

Mutation of J.B. (in Slovak: Mutácia Johnyho Burgera) is a 1996 point-and-click adventure game by Slovak developer Invention. It was released for MS-DOS by Riki Computer Games in Slovakia, by Vochozka Trading (now 2K Czech) in the Czech Republic and by Neo Software in the German speaking countries.

== Plot ==
The player controls Johnny Burger, who plans to visit his cousin Emanuel for two weeks. A scientist offers him money to be part of an experiment. The experiment goes wrong, the scientist disappears, Johnny gets turned into a human pig, and he is kidnapped to the Planet Ladea. He must return things to how they were and find out what happened to Emanuel.

== Development ==
This was the very first Slovak video game on CD which also included Slovak voice acting. Voice actors included were Jozef Pročko, Ladislav Kocan, and Riki magazine's editor-in-chief Ivo Ninja. It is also the first Slovak commercial point & click adventure.

The publishers actively tried to push against the rampant piracy by publishing the title directly into the Slovak language without subtitles. The Austrian publisher NEO included German language with subtitles and insisted that the games' music must be uploaded directly to them in the studio in Vienna.

== Reception ==
Adventure-archiv praised the puzzles and story for being highly original. Gamesite.sk editor listed the title as the fifth best game of all time.
