= Manhunt 2 =

2007 video game

- Developer: Rockstar London (Note: Originally in development at Rockstar Vienna. Additional development by Rockstar Toronto and Rockstar North. Ported to PlayStation Portable by Rockstar Leeds, and to Wii and Microsoft Windows by Rockstar Toronto.)
- Publisher: Rockstar Games
- Producer: Mark Washbrook
- Designer: Charlie Bewsher
- Programmer: Thomas Busser
- Artist: Leigh Malpas
- Writers: Charlie Bewsher; Christian Cantamessa; John Zurhellen
- Composer: Craig Conner
- Engine: RenderWare
- Platforms: PlayStation 2; PlayStation Portable; Wii; Microsoft Windows
- Release: PS2, PSP, Wii: NA: 29 October 2007; EU: 31 October 2008; Microsoft Windows: NA: 6 November 2009
- Genre: Stealth
- Mode: Single-player

Manhunt 2 is a 2007 stealth game by Rockstar Games. It was developed by Rockstar London for Microsoft Windows and PlayStation 2, Rockstar Leeds for the PlayStation Portable, and Rockstar Toronto for the Wii. It is the sequel to 2003's Manhunt and was released in North America on 29 October 2007, and in PAL territories from 31 October 2008. The game follows Daniel Lamb, a mental patient suffering from amnesia as he tries to uncover his identity, and Leo Kasper, a sociopathic assassin who guides Daniel in his journey.

Originally scheduled for a North American and European release in July 2007, the game was suspended by Rockstar's parent company Take-Two Interactive when it was refused classification in some countries and given an Adults Only (AO) rating in the United States. As Nintendo, Microsoft, and Sony Computer Entertainment do not allow licensed releases of AO titles on their consoles, this would have severely limited their potential customer base in the US as well. In response to these ratings problems, Rockstar censored the game, blurring the screen during the game's executions and removing the scoring system, which rewarded players for particularly brutal killings; this edited version was rated M in the US by the ESRB and was released on 29 October. However, boards in some other countries still refused the edited version, such as the BBFC in Britain and the IFCO in Ireland; following Rockstar appealing, ultimately the game was accepted with an 18 certificate and PEGI 18 rating respectively. Still, in some countries such as Germany and Malaysia, Manhunt 2 was banned outright.

Manhunt 2 received mixed reviews from critics: the improved gameplay, game engine, plot twists, darker storyline, and use of extreme violence was praised, but its voice acting and outdated graphics drew mixed responses. The title garnered controversy before and after its release, getting the attention of British parliament member Keith Vaz, American anti-video game activist Jack Thompson, and various US senators. It was nominated for GameSpy's 2007 Game of the Year Award for the PS2.

== Gameplay ==
Stealth in Manhunt 2; Daniel Lamb, attempting to execute an enemy guard with a baseball bat.

Players primarily assume the role of Daniel Lamb in a third-person perspective, with Leo Kasper also playable in certain missions. Although different in appearance and personality, both have similar controls. As with the original game, the primary gameplay mechanic is stealth execution, whereby the player character must approach an enemy from behind, undetected, and kill them. There are three 'levels' of execution, with each level progressively more violent and graphic than the last; Level 1 (Hasty) executions are quick and not very gory, Level 2 (Violent) are considerably more gory, and Level 3 (Gruesome) are over-the-top. The player is in control of which level they use; once the player has locked onto an enemy, the lock-on reticule changes color over time to indicate the level; white (level 1), yellow (level 2), and red (level 3). When playing on PC or Wii while doing the executions, there is a quick time event which lists down certain moves that either the mouse or Wii Controller must move or by pressing a certain button at a specific time in order to finish the execution. If it does not finish in the specific time, it will stop the execution and skips it entirely, although the player still kills the person.

Manhunt 2's stealth elements have been updated from the previous game. For example, players are given more choices in terms of executing enemies. Aside from the three levels of execution per weapon, players can use firearms for executions. Two further additions to the execution system are "environmental executions" whereby the player can use elements of the game world (such as manhole covers, telephones, fuse boxes, toilets, etc.) to eliminate opponents, and "jump executions" whereby players can attack enemies from above by leaping off a ledge. A scoring system based on how brutal the executions was excluded from the console versions in order to obtain an M rating from ESRB, while the PC version retained this feature.

While out of combat, players must hide from enemies by staying out of their point of view or hiding in the shadows. The shadow system in the game has been tweaked from the first game. In Manhunt, unless a hunter saw a player enter a shadow area, he would be unable to detect the player within it. In Manhunt 2 however, enemy AI has been expanded, with some enemies more vigilant than others. When hiding in the shadows, if an enemy investigates the area, the player may have to mimic a combination of buttons or motions (similar to that of a quick time event), in order to regulate the character's breathing so as to ensure that he remains calm and undetected. In the PC and Wii version, the player must keep the cursor inside an on-screen circle. Climbing and crawling have been added to the game to increase the sense of exploration. Another new feature is the ability to smash lights so as to create extra pockets of shadow. Audio is an important aspect of the game. Tasks such as running, opening doors, walking on gravel and cornstalks, or accidentally knocking objects over, can alert the enemy to the player's position. However, sound sources such as machinery can be used as a tool to cover the player's own noise. Other forms of combat aside from stealth are incorporated. Firearms allow for gunfights. Players can take cover from enemy fire, while individual body parts such as the head can be targeted. Painkillers can be found throughout the game, improving the player's health. When the player is discovered by an enemy, they can either run, hide or attempt to fight back with hand-to-hand combat.

== Synopsis ==
=== Setting ===
Manhunt 2 takes place circa 2007, with flashback sequences set six years prior, (Note: Dixmor Hospital Patient Records (Instruction Manual), page 8 – "Confidential" (Re-written report). Timeline of events for the Pickman Bridge incident depicted on flashback sequences are dated prior to 2006.) within the fictional city of Cottonmouth, (Note: Even though the name of the city in which Manhunt 2 takes place is never mentioned in the actual game, it was revealed to be Cottonmouth in a Q&A with Rockstar.) which is inspired by several southern US cities, mainly New Orleans. Like its predecessor, the game is part of the same shared universe as the Grand Theft Auto series also created by Rockstar Games. (Note: Dixmor Hospital Patient Records (Instruction Manual), page 4 – "Patient Files: Daniel Lamb". "EDUCATION: B.S., Biochemistry - UNIVERSITY OF SAN FIERRO, SAN ANDREAS, 1985")

=== Plot ===
In 2007, at the Dixmor Asylum for the Criminally Insane, a severe thunderstorm causes the security system at the asylum to momentarily go offline, opening the cell doors throughout the facility, resulting in the populace wandering freely through the corridors. Two somewhat saner inmates are Daniel Lamb (Ptolemy Slocum) and Leo Kasper (Holter Graham). Daniel, who suffers from disorientation and is partly amnesiac, is unable to remember how or why he was admitted to Dixmor. Under Leo's guidance, they escape the facility and make their way to the ruins of Daniel's old home. Inside, Daniel recovers medication which Leo says he left there for himself in the event of him forgetting the past. The medication helps to clear his head somewhat, and he begins to remember fragments of his former life. He and Leo then set out to unravel the secrets of Daniel's past, all the while pursued by bounty hunters and agents of a mysterious organization called "The Project".

As the plot unfolds, Daniel learns that he was once a top scientist in the employment of the "Pickman Project", a government-sponsored weapons program involving brainwashing and mind control techniques. The Project's goal was to create the perfect assassin; to accomplish this, they developed the "Pickman Bridge", a brain implant containing the personality and skills of a trained assassin which could be activated on command. Theoretically, these personalities can coexist, unaware of each other. The idea is to remotely activate the assassin persona for a mission, but keep it disabled otherwise, meaning the person would then have no memory of what happened, neutralizing enemy interrogation.

As Daniel puts the clues together and begins to remember more of his past, he and Leo set out to find Dr. Whyte, a Project researcher and one of Daniel's co-workers. However, before they can get to her, they are ambushed and sedated. Daniel wakes up in a room with Whyte, who reveals the truth to him. Six years prior, with the Project's funds under threat, Daniel volunteered himself to test the Pickman Bridge, hoping that the resulting payoff would allow him to clear his family's debts and provide a financially secure future. However, the Bridge malfunctioned soon after it was implanted, causing Daniel to suffer from dissociative identity disorder, resulting in him being able to directly communicate with the implanted personality, who he perceives as a real person - Leo Kasper. Whyte explains that Leo is dangerously unstable, and has been working against Daniel from the very beginning.

Whyte reveals that, after the implant malfunctioned, Leo's personality asserted itself, suppressing Daniel's own, and he went on a rampage across the city, murdering police officers and members of the Project, destroying the Project's records of Daniel and himself, and finally making his way to Daniel's household and killing his wife. His goal was to weaken Daniel's grip on reality to the point where Leo could take complete control of his mind. However, the Project caught Daniel/Leo after the murder, erased his memory, torched his house, and had him committed to Dixmor, where they had been working to study the effects of the implant and repair the damage, without success. Upon learning the truth, Daniel determines that he must destroy Leo once and for all. He enters a deep hypnotic state and faces off against Leo within the confines of his own mind. He is finally able to let go of the guilt he feels over his wife's death, allowing him to destroy Leo and assert control.

Having done so, Daniel awakens on a deserted road with his memory erased once more. He is holding an envelope informing him that his name is "David Joiner", providing him with a new home address at 526 Hope Street, Apartment B, and wishing him luck. Daniel briefly hesitates before walking away.

An alternate ending is unlocked on the Hard difficulty or if Danny killed too many civilians throughout the game, resulting in the final battle being played from Leo's perspective. He successfully destroys Daniel's personality and wakes up in control of his mind and body. Whyte, believing she is speaking to Daniel, asks him if he is okay, to which he replies he is keen to get back to work on the Bridge. As he looks at himself in the mirror, Daniel sees Leo's reflection looking back at him.

== Development ==
Development on Manhunt 2 commenced shortly after the release of the first Manhunt. Rockstar North, who had developed the first game, were working on Grand Theft Auto: San Andreas, so development was handed over to Rockstar Vienna. From Q1 to Q3 of 2005, German developer Rabcat Computer Graphics assisted them in the creation of 350+ 3D assets. However, on 11 May 2006, Rockstar Vienna was closed, and the main development of the game was handed to Rockstar London. Rockstar Toronto was tasked with developing a Wii version and Rockstar Leeds was tasked with the PSP version. The game was officially announced by Take-Two on 6 February 2007, scheduled for a worldwide July 2007 release. Despite working on the game for two years, members of Rockstar Vienna received no credit in the final product.

Rockstar launched the first teaser website of the game on 7 February 2007, and the official website was launched two months later. Additional information was provided by the Official PlayStation Magazine who had the first look at the game. Press coverage from other sources such as Kotaku and IGN soon followed. Kotaku posted an eyes-on-preview of Manhunt 2 featuring a recording of someone playing the game, which showed the first footage of direct gameplay. The video was recorded at a Sony Computer Entertainment event held in North America.

== Controversy ==
=== Pre-release ===
The controversy surrounding Manhunt 2 began two days after its announcement, before any footage or information on the game had been released. The initial topic of discussion was the fact that the first game had been erroneously connected to a murder in the UK. Take-Two themselves preempted this debate, issuing a statement on 8 February, in which they said "We are aware that in direct contradiction to all available evidence, certain individuals continue to link the original Manhunt title to the Warren Leblanc case in 2004. The transcript of the court case makes it quite clear what really happened. At sentencing the Judge, defence, prosecution and Leicester police all emphasised that Manhunt played no part in the case." Later that day, Patrick and Giselle Pakeerah (parents of Leblanc's victim) condemned the game and insisted that Manhunt was a factor in their son's murder. Leicester East MP Keith Vaz supported the Pakeerahs, claiming he was "astonished" that Rockstar were making a sequel.

On 23 February, activist Jack Thompson vowed to have the game banned, claiming that the police were incorrect in asserting the game belonged to Pakeerah, and that Take-Two were lying about the incident; "[I] have been asked by individuals in the United Kingdom to help stop the distribution of Take-Two/Rockstar's hyperviolent video game Manhunt 2 in that country due out this summer. The game will feature stealth murder and torture. The last version allowed suffocation of victims with plastic bags. The original Manhunt was responsible for the bludgeoning death of a British youth by his friend who obsessively played the game. The killer used a hammer just as in the game he played. Take-Two/Rockstar, anticipating the firestorm of criticism with the release of the murder simulator sequel, is lying to the public on both sides of the pond in stating this week that the game had nothing to do with the murder." On 10 March, Thompson said he planned to sue Take-Two/Rockstar in an effort to have both Manhunt 2 and Grand Theft Auto IV banned as "public nuisances".

On 16 March, Take-Two petitioned U.S. District Court for the Southern District of Florida to block the impending lawsuit, on the grounds that video games purchased for private entertainment could not be considered public nuisances. The following day, Thompson wrote on his website: "I have been praying, literally, that Take-Two and its lawyers would do something so stupid, that such a misstep would enable me to destroy Take-Two. The pit Take-Two has dug for itself will be patently clear next week when I strike back." On 21 March, Thompson filed a counter-suit, accusing Take-Two of multiple violations of the Racketeer Influenced and Corrupt Organizations Act (RICO), specifically a continued effort to violate his constitutional rights. He also accused the Entertainment Software Association, Penny Arcade, IGN, GamePolitics.com, GameSpot, GameSpy, Eurogamer, Kotaku, Blank Rome and the US Justice Department of collaborating and conspiring with Take-Two to commit racketeering activities. He went on to refer to Rockstar North as "Scottish sociopaths sipping their single malt Glenlivet in between brainstorming software programming sessions", and accused Take-Two of "spewing its pop culture sewage to the world's children". However, his claim was weakened by several factual errors contained within it.

The dispute was ultimately settled before it went to the courts; Thompson agreed not to sue, threaten to sue or attempt to block the sale or distribution of any Take-Two game, and not to communicate to Take-Two or any store selling their games any accusation that they have committed a wrongdoing by selling such products. For their part, Take-Two agreed to drop a prior suit accusing Thompson of contempt of court concerning the game Bully, which he attempted to have banned in 2005.

However, in a letter dated 8 May, to Wendy's CEO Kerrii Anderson, Thompson demanded that the restaurant drop an upcoming promotion featuring children's toys designed after the Wii games Excite Truck, Wii Sports and Super Mario Galaxy because Manhunt 2 was scheduled for release on the console. Wendy's did not respond to Thompson, and continued with their Wii promotion. On 12 May, he sent a letter to Florida Attorney General Bill McCollum and Florida Governor Charlie Crist which read, in part, "Florida retailers are scheduled to sell a very violent video game called Manhunt 2 which will be available, remarkably, for 'play' on the kids-friendly Nintendo Wii gaming platform. The Wii device does not utilize traditional push-button game controllers but instead utilizes hand-held motion capture devices ... It is a training device." In a 6 June interview on Fox News, McCollum expressed concerns regarding how Manhunt 2 utilized the Wii Remote in an interactive manner; for instance, in order to stab someone, the player would have to flick the Remote forward, in much the same fashion one would do when actually stabbing with a knife; when cutting someone's throat, the player would have to move the remote from left to right.

Also concerned about the Wii version of the game was the Center for a Commercial-Free Childhood (CCFC), who wrote to the ESRB demanding that the game be rated AO.

=== Rating ===
On 19 June 2007, less than a month prior to the game's worldwide release, Manhunt 2 was rejected by both the BBFC and the IFCO. David Cooke, Director of the BBFC issued a statement, which read, in part;

Rejecting a work is a very serious action and one which we do not take lightly. Where possible we try to consider cuts or, in the case of games, modifications which remove the material which contravenes the Board's published Guidelines. In the case of Manhunt 2 this has not been possible. Manhunt 2 is distinguishable from recent high-end video games by its unremitting bleakness and callousness of tone in an overall game context which constantly encourages visceral killing with exceptionally little alleviation or distancing. There is sustained and cumulative casual sadism in the way in which these killings are committed, and encouraged, in the game. Although the difference should not be exaggerated the fact of the game's unrelenting focus on stalking and brutal slaying and the sheer lack of alternative pleasures on offer to the gamer, together with the different overall narrative context, contribute towards differentiating this submission from the original Manhunt game. That work was classified '18' in 2003, before the BBFC's recent games research had been undertaken, but was already at the very top end of what the Board judged to be acceptable at that category. Against this background, the Board's carefully considered view is that to issue a certificate to Manhunt 2, on either platform, would involve a range of unjustifiable harm risks, to both adults and minors, within the terms of the Video Recordings Act, and accordingly that its availability, even if statutorily confined to adults, would be unacceptable to the public.

In response to the ban, Rockstar issued a statement: "We are disappointed with the recent decision by the British Board of Film Classification to refuse classification of Manhunt 2. While we respect the authority of the classification board and will abide by the rules, we emphatically disagree with this particular decision. Manhunt 2 is an entertainment experience for fans of psychological thrillers and horror. The subject matter of this game is in line with other mainstream entertainment choices for adult consumers." Rockstar also stated that they felt the game was well within the guidelines to be granted an 18 certificate, and they implied that the BBFC treated games differently from how they treated films, arguing that Manhunt 2 was no more violent than recent films such as Saw and Hostel. Later, the BBFC's press officer, Sue Clarke, told IGN that Rockstar was wrong in this assertion, and that "[they] haven't singled out" Manhunt 2.

Later that same day, in an unexpected move, the ESRB issued the game with an AO rating. The initial impact of this decision was that major retail chains, such as Walmart, GameStop and Target would not stock the title. The following day, 20 June, Nintendo, Microsoft, and Sony Computer Entertainment issued statements saying they do not allow AO titles on their platforms, which effectively meant the game would have been banned in the US.

A few months after news of the rating broke, an early uncut PlayStation 2 version was leaked online by a Sony Computer Entertainment Europe employee.

=== Re-rating ===
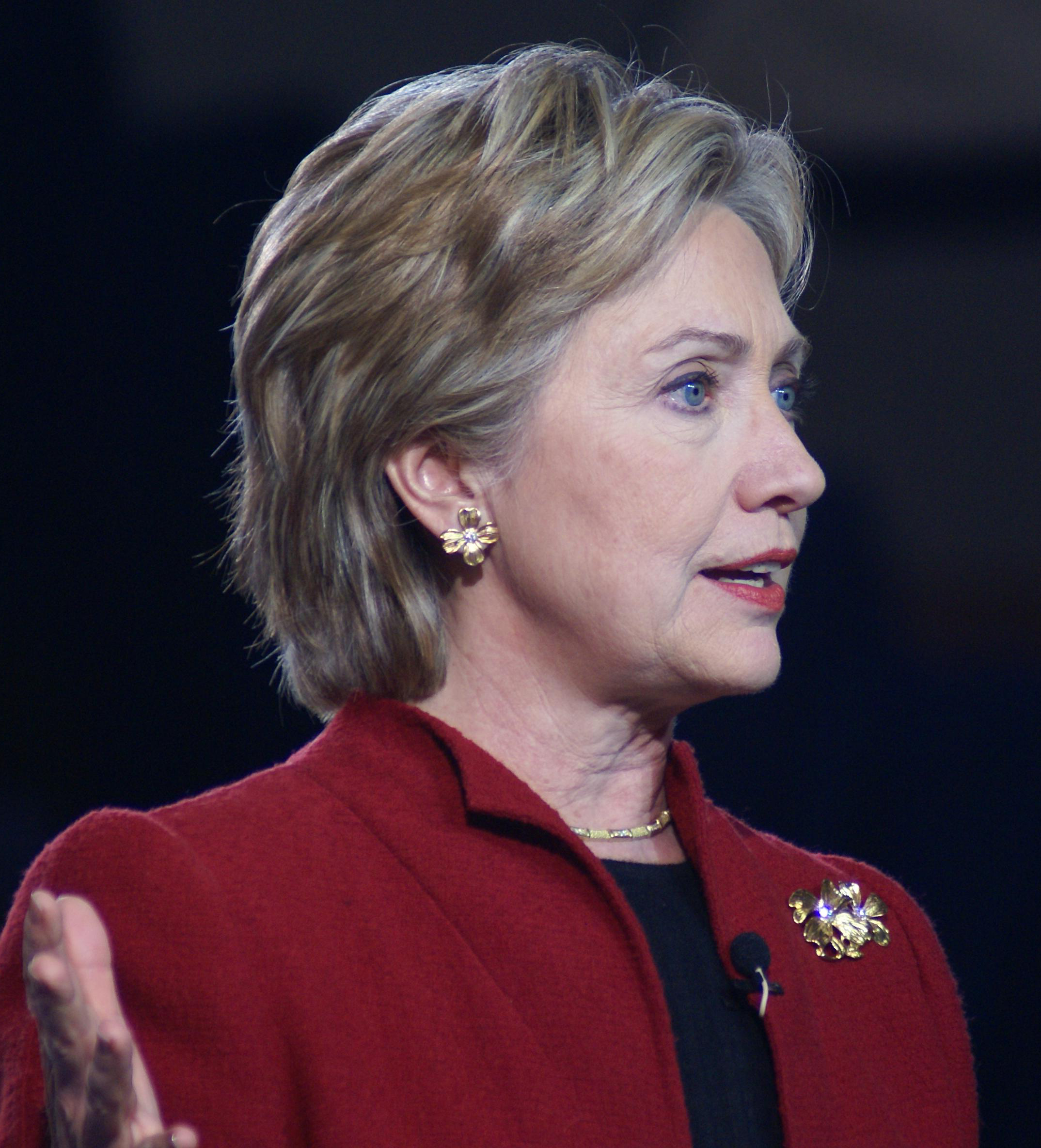
US Senator Hillary Clinton was one of the senators who wrote a letter to ESRB concerning their rating of the game as Mature, asking the ESRB to re-rate the game to AO, where they described it as "visceral and casually sadistic".

In light of the BBFC and ESRB decisions, Rockstar decided to censor the game. Censoring took five main forms. The primary alteration was the addition of a blurring effect over executions; during an execution the screen turns red, and flashes black-and-white. The second alteration was the removal of all but two decapitations. Initially, several weapons in the game could decapitate enemies, but with the exception of two plot-important decapitations, all such executions were removed. Thirdly, the pliers executions were toned down. Originally, a gruesome execution with the pliers involved ripping off the enemy's testicles, whilst a level 2 execution involved tearing open his throat. In the edited version, the pliers are used to beat the enemy over the head. The fourth change was the removal of innocent characters from certain levels. Originally, the game was structured in such a way that the player had the choice as to whether or not to kill these characters. If they did not, they got the ending where Daniel defeats Leo; if they did, they got the alternative ending. The final change involved the rating system. Originally, the game had a rating system similar to the first game, whereby the player was rated based on speed and severity of execution types. To achieve a maximum rating, one had to perform a set number of gruesome executions in each level. This rating system was completely removed from the edited version.

In August, Rockstar submitted the re-edited version to the ESRB and BBFC. The ESRB were satisfied and granted the game an M rating on 24 August. Later that day, the Campaign For a Commercial-Free Childhood called for a federal investigation into how the game had had its rating downgraded:

The [CCFC] is extremely concerned that the ESRB has downgraded its rating for Manhunt 2 ... Despite industry claims to the contrary, M-rated games continue to be marketed and sold to children under seventeen. The ESRB's reversal of its earlier decision dramatically increases the likelihood that Manhunt 2 – the most violent game to date produced for the interactive Nintendo Wii platform – will be marketed and sold to children. Just three months ago, the ESRB felt that Manhunt 2 was so violent that it took the extraordinary step of giving a game an AO rating for violent content for only the second time in its history. We urge the ESRB to make public their rationale for changing Manhunt 2's rating, including detailing any content that was removed from the game. We call upon Rockstar Games to allow the content of Manhunt 2 to be reviewed by an independent review board with no ties to the video game industry. We ask the Federal Trade Commission to investigate the process by which Manhunt 2's rating was downgraded from AO to M.

California State Senator Leland Yee expressed similar sentiments: "Parents can't trust a rating system that doesn't even disclose how they come to a particular rating. The ESRB and Rockstar should end this game of secrecy by immediately unveiling what content has been changed to grant the new rating and what correspondence occurred between the ESRB and Rockstar to come to this conclusion. Unfortunately, history shows that we must be quite skeptical of these two entities. ... Clearly the ESRB has a conflict of interest in rating these games. It is time to bring transparency to this rating system and for the industry to be held accountable. I join the CCFC in urging the Federal Trade Commission to investigate the process by which Manhunt 2's rating was downgraded from AO to M." On 29 August, ESRB President Patricia Vance stated that the ESRB had no intention of revealing how it came to the decision to downgrade the rating.

Manhunt 2 was released for PSP, PS2 and Wii in the US on 31 October, with an M rating. The very next day, 1 November, a method that removed the blurring effect on the PSP and PS2 versions was released by a group of PSP crackers. A Wii version of the blur removal soon followed. Leland Yee and the Parents Television Council demanded that Manhunt 2 be re-rated AO, but after examining the situation, the ESRB concluded it was not Rockstar's fault that these hacks could be used and decided to stick with the M rating.

On 22 November, US Senators Joe Lieberman, Sam Brownback, Evan Bayh and Hillary Clinton wrote an open letter to the ESRB asking for the game to be re-rated AO: "we ask your consideration of whether it is time to review the robustness, reliability and repeatability of your ratings process, particularly for this genre of 'ultraviolent' video games and the advances in game controllers. We have consistently urged parents to pay attention to the ESRB rating system. We must ensure that parents can rely on the consistency and accuracy of those ratings." The ESRB again refused to re-rate the game, and stuck with the M rating.

=== BBFC ===
Despite the ESRB's decision to rate the game M in the US, on 8 October, the BBFC once again refused to classify the game. David Cooke, Director of the BBFC stated "We recognize that the distributor has made changes to the game, but we do not consider that these go far enough to address our concerns about the original version. The impact of the revisions on the bleakness and callousness of tone, or the essential nature of the gameplay, is clearly insufficient. There has been a reduction in the visual detail in some of the 'execution kills', but in others they retain their original visceral and casually sadistic nature. We did make suggestions for further changes to the game, but the distributor has chosen not to make them, and as a result we have rejected the game on both platforms."

On 26 November, Rockstar appealed the BBFC's second decision not to rate the game with their lawyer, Geoffrey Robertson. TIGA president Fred Hasson testified that he was "surprised at how tame [Manhunt 2] is compared to some very graphical scenes I've seen in other games which have received certification. I expected it to be a lot worse. I can't believe that this has been singled out as something that is worth banning." He went on to accuse the BBFC of making their decision based on media pressure, particularly from the Daily Mail, which had run a campaign to have the first game banned.

On 10 December 2007, the Video Appeals Committee overruled the BBFC by four votes to three. However, On 17 December, the BBFC challenged the VAC decision in the High Court at the Royal Courts of Justice, claiming that the VAC had overruled them based on a "misinterpretation of the law" as laid out in the Video Recordings Act 1984. This challenge superseded the VAC decision that the game could be classified, and halted any possibility of it going on sale. On 24 January 2008, the BBFC won their case in the High Court. Presiding Justice Mitting agreed with the BBFC's argument that the VAC had erred when considering whether the game could be considered harmful to minors. Whereas the VAC interpreted this as "actual harm", the BBFC and Mitting believed it referred to "potential harm and risk of harm". The BBFC also argued that the VAC based its decision on whether or not the game would have a "devastating effect on society", and argued that this "harm threshold" was too high. Mitting ordered that the same seven-member panel review their findings, and whatever decision they reach the second time would stand. The VAC did so, but they returned with exactly the same result as the first time – four votes to three in favor of classifying the game. The game was ultimately released on PS2, PSP and Wii on 31 October 2008 with an 18 certificate, a year after the US release and the same day as the rest of Europe.

=== International reaction ===
Internationally, Manhunt 2 proved just as controversial. The game was banned outright in Germany, Malaysia, New Zealand and South Korea. The uncensored version of the game was also banned in Ireland by the Irish Film Classification Office for a short time due to "gross, unrelenting and gratuitous violence", but was later allowed in its cut form under a PEGI "18" rating. In Italy, Minister of Communications Paolo Gentiloni expressed the desire to ban the game in the country, but no such ban came into effect. In Australia, where the original Manhunt was banned, the game was never even submitted for classification to the Australian Classification Board, rendering it essentially banned in the country.

=== PC release ===
On 31 October 2009, Rockstar started taking pre-orders for a PC version of the original unedited version of the game through Direct2Drive. It was released in the US on 6 November 2009 with an AO rating. However, the game was later removed from the service in July 2011 after Direct2Drive was purchased by GameFly, due to GameFly's policy of not carrying AO-rated games. On 25 November 2011, the uncut version was available again in GamersGate, but is only available for select regions. In May 2015, live-streaming service Twitch announced a list of games which are prohibited from being broadcast on its platform, including a unified ban for all games receiving the Adults Only rating, therefore banning the uncut version from the site.

== Reception ==
Reception

Aggregate score
Aggregator	Score		
Aggregator	PS2	PSP	Wii
Metacritic	67/100	69/100	62/100

Review scores
Publication	Score		
Publication	PS2	PSP	Wii
1Up.com	D+	N/A	N/A
Game Informer	N/A	N/A	7.75/10
GamesMaster	N/A	N/A	88%
GameSpot	7.5/10	7.5/10	7.0/10
IGN	7.5/10	7.5/10	7.7/10
Nintendo Power	N/A	N/A	7.5/10
Official U.S. PlayStation Magazine	80%	N/A	N/A
Play	82%	N/A	N/A
PSM3	83%	N/A	N/A
X-Play	N/A	N/A	2/5

Award
Publication	Award
Complex	The 100 Best Video Games of the Complex Decade by Complex Magazine (#81)

Manhunt 2 received "mixed or average reviews", according to reviewer aggregator Metacritic. Positive reception came from the game's presentation of graphic violence and its psychological horror-based storyline. GameSpot's Kevin VanOrd said the game was "not as shocking as you'd expect, but Manhunt 2 still satisfies your primal instincts", and that the game was better to play on the PSP platform. Mikel Reparaz from GamesRadar stated that "if you're in the mood for something creepy and horrific that'll leave you feeling a little dirty, Manhunt 2's still-shocking murders and eerie, is-it-real-or-am-I-just-insane storyline won't disappoint." Game Informer gave the Wii version of the game 7.75/10, saying "Manhunt 2 is every bit as grim and brutal as the first [...] the writing, as is typical of Rockstar's games, is top-notch, and Daniel and the rest of the characters do come off the screen as very real and human [...] It's a testament to this quality that I was really driven to see the tale out to its end." Similarly, Nintendo Power gave the Wii version 7.5/10, stating that while the game does deliver for the most part, they were disappointed by the way external influences led Rockstar to change the game, and that the story, while interesting, is "highly predictable". Yahoo! reviewed the PSP version, stating "there's simply never been a game quite as squeamishly immersive as this [...] it's even more terrifying for seeming like the most real thing in a game this year."

Jeff Haynes from IGN compared the game to the original, finding it fell short of the standard that game set; "Manhunt 2 isn't the tour de force title that will grab your attention and keep you there like the first one did." The review went on to state that "the AI doesn't feel as good as the first game, the setting and environments don't feel as menacing, and the story is definitely weaker. That isn't to say that Manhunt 2 isn't a good game, because it is." 1UP.com stated that "really, the game warrants a 4 [out of 10] because it's technically playable and, despite its best efforts, probably won't plunge the industry into a period of navel-gazing and political sanction. Everything else about it is largely forgettable." Jonathan Hunt from X-Play suggested that without the controversy concerning the rating, the game would be "nothing more than an obscure footnote in Rockstar's history." Ars Technica's Michael Thompson echoed similar thoughts, writing in a retrospective piece in 2009 that the controversy surrounding Manhunt 2 "was more interesting than the game itself."

The game is listed at #8 in IGN's "Top 10 Gaming Controversies" and was ranked (alongside the first game) as the sixth most controversial video game by UGO Networks. Machinima listed Daniel Lamb and Leo Kasper #7 in their "Top 10 Criminal Duos in Gaming".

== Future ==
Take-Two Interactive has denied that it has any plans to continue the Manhunt series.

In October 2007, Stephen Totilo of MTV Games asked Rockstar Games producer Jeronimo Barrera about the possibilities of a multiplayer component being added to future iterations of the Manhunt franchise, such as adding the game to the Rockstar Games Social Club. Barrera seemingly embraced the idea.

That's a very interesting question. ... Who knows where the 'Manhunt' series is going to go? And that's definitely something that warrants some exploring on our part for sure.
