= Ford Levacar Mach I =

1950s concept hover vehicle

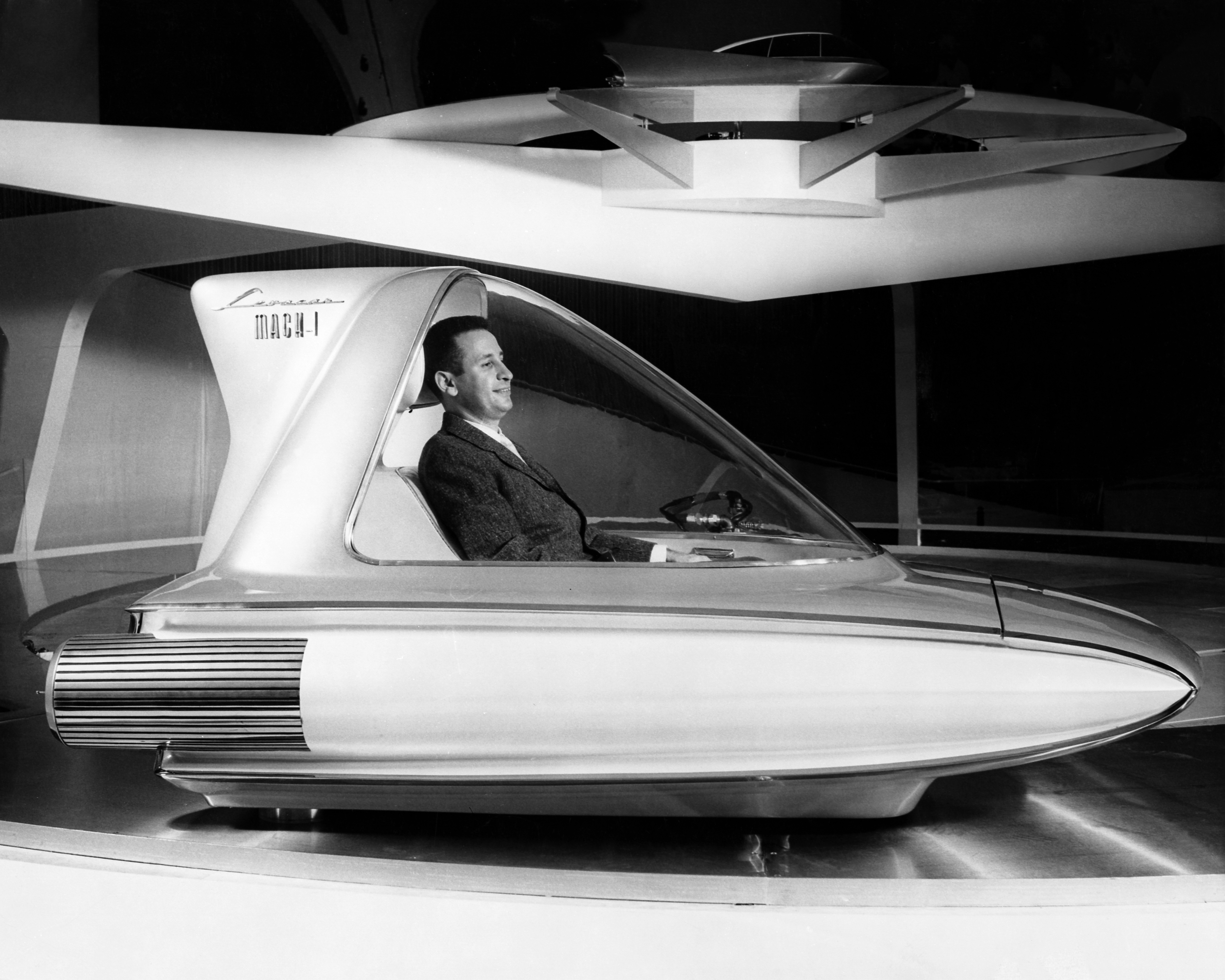
The vehicle

The Ford Mach I, also known as the Ford Levacar Mach I, is a concept car hovercraft developed by the Ford Motor Company in the 1950s. The Mach I was a single-seat automobile which rode on pressurized air, not wheels. Its name was inspired by the speed Mach 1, an aspiration speed not yet achieved by vehicles at the time. It used air pressure at a force of 15–100 psi (100–690 kPa) to provide lift and propulsion. In experiments, 50–60 psi (340–410 kPa) was used so that 15 hp (11 kW) was needed for levitation and 2.5 hp (1.9 kW) propelled it 20 mph (32 km/h). An advertisement for the Mach I appeared in the magazine Boys' Life in 1960, in which it indicated the single-seater's dimensions: 94 in (2.4 m) long; 48 in (1.2 m) high; 54 in (1.4 m) wide.

The Levacar project was led by Andrew A. Kucher (a Ford Vice-President for Engineering and Research) and David J. Jay (a Senior Development Engineer). Kucher had initially conceived the concept around 1930. One of the lead designers was Gale Halderman, known for being the initial designer of the Ford Mustang. In addition to the Mach I automobile, the project also developed a similarly outfitted scooter, the Levascooter. In experiments on a circular track, vehicles would raise .125 inches (3.2 mm) off the ground and could jump 1 inch (25 mm) obstacles.

The Mach I was displayed for about two years in the late 1950s in Dearborn, Michigan.

== See also ==
- Hovercar
- Hoverboard
- Maglev
