= Quarantine (video game) =

1994 video game

- Developer: Imagexcel
- Publisher: GameTek
- Platforms: MS-DOS, 3DO, PlayStation, Saturn
- Release: MS-DOS: NA: 1994; 3DO: NA: 1995; PlayStation: JP: 16 February 1996; Saturn: JP: 12 July 1996
- Genres: Racing, first-person shooter
- Mode: Single-player

Quarantine is a 1994 racing/first-person shooter video game for MS-DOS and 3DO, created by Imagexcel and published by GameTek. Versions for the Japanese market were done in 1996 by Asmik for the PlayStation and by MediaQuest for the Sega Saturn, renamed as Hard Rock Cab and Death Throttle respectively. In the game the player drives a taxicab through a post-apocalyptic city, picking up customers and killing enemies.

The game was followed by a sequel, Quarantine II: Road Warrior. The sequel largely kept the original gameplay, but introduced a more mission and story-driven gameplay.

== Plot ==
KEMO city was known for the manufacture of hovercars, meeting the country's demands for transportation until 2022. Over time, however, the crime rate had risen so far that the economy collapsed and the city descended into disorder. Criminals roamed the streets in armored hovercars, terrorizing the citizens without fear of retribution. In 2029, OmniCorp promised city officials that it could clean up KEMO and return it to normal. The offer was accepted, and the corporation began the construction of a massive wall around the city under the guise of a "defensive measure". The wall was completed three years later, and the only exit sealed shut, turning KEMO into a massive prison city for all inside, criminal or otherwise. The outraged population reacted violently, and the city degenerated.

Ten years later OmniCorp decided to test the behavior altering chemical Hydergine 344 on the population of KEMO. This chemical was supposed to pacify the citizens and distributed through the city's water supply. Unfortunately, OmniCorp failed to predict the chemical's reaction to stagnant water, resulting in massive brain damage and insanity in the many citizens. More than half the population became crazed killers overnight.

Drake Edgewater, a 21st-century cab driver and one of the lucky few unaffected by the spreading virus, is desperate to escape the city alive. Driving his '52 Checker hovercab armed with an assortment of vehicle-mounted weaponry, he delivers passengers and packages for what money he can make to upgrade his vehicle and escape.

== Gameplay ==
The primary gameplay loop of Quarantine consists of using a weapon-equipped taxi to pick up passengers, deliver packages, and defeat enemies. In between missions, the player replenishes the taxi's ammunition and armor by visiting service stations, marked on the player's map. Missions send the player through Kemo City's various districts. Progression from one zone to the next is blocked by password-protected gates until the player has completed enough story missions to advance.

Quarantine required a rather powerful system when it was released. One of the original ads in magazines for the game used the slogan "If you've got the ram, we've got the pedestrians."

Quarantine, long before Grand Theft Auto III and other similar games, employed the drive-by shooting tactic of using the Uzi to shoot out from the side windows.

== Ports ==
The PlayStation and Sega Saturn versions were released in Japan exclusively, under the names Hard Rock Cab and Death Throttle, respectively. They are mostly the same as the original PC version, but while they had enhanced floor and building texturing, they suffer from slowdown and pixelation. The essential textscreen information is translated to Japanese, though most text remains in English and the live action video is neither dubbed nor subtitled. Additionally, the PlayStation version features green blood censorship.

== Reception ==
Reception

Review scores
Publication	Score
Computer Gaming World	3/5
Electronic Gaming Monthly	5.75/10 (3DO)
Next Generation	4/5 (DOS); 3/5 (3DO)

Next Generation reviewed the PC version of the game, stating that "Plenty of new weapons and powerup items along with different mission options give the game long-term play potential. Bloody fun for budding psychotics."

Reviewing the 3DO version, the four reviewers of Electronic Gaming Monthly were divided. They all concurred that the driving controls are subpar, but while three of them opined that Quarantine would appeal to a niche audience (one predicted it "may be a cult hit") with its soundtrack and strange, tongue-in-cheek humor, the fourth simply declared it "Too warped for me." GamePro's reviewer also predicted the game was "bound to gain cult status" and gave it a rave review, praising the usefulness of the four camera views, the high level of uncensored violence, the introductory FMV, the "macabre" backgrounds, and the large selection of rock music tracks. They noted that the driving controls are difficult but concluded that "Doom lovers looking to score more gore will dig this grim, futuristic escape saga". A reviewer for Next Generation commented that while the open world, open-ended structure is captivating, both it and the vehicle's controls have a steep learning curve which demands that the player spend considerable time learning the game before actually playing it. He concluded that "the game is on balance, once you get the hang of things, and it's cool".

Mark Clarkson from Computer Gaming World faced some compatibility issues trying to play the game - about once in every three times, the sound card failed to be recognized by the game. Also, the game locked up occasionally, needing a computer-reset to fix. He described playing Quarantine as being "like playing Doom from a car in a universe that's equal parts Escape from New York and The Rocky Horror Picture Show." He praised the game world and its landscape and felt that some of the included music was "pretty good." He concludes that "small errors, inconsistencies and a very loose interpretation of "driving" make [the game] a slightly more bumpy ride than was intended."
