= Spherical Worlds =

1996 video game

- Developer: 4-Matted
- Publisher: Neo Software
- Designer: Mirko Rizman
- Programmer: Zvonko Tešić
- Artists: Zvonko Tešić; Mirko Rizman
- Writer: Mirko Rizman
- Composers: Zvonko Tešić; Goran Štetić
- Platform: Amiga
- Release: EU: 1996
- Genre: Shoot 'em up
- Mode: Single-player

Spherical Worlds is a shoot 'em up video game developed by 4-Matted and published by Neo Software, released for Amiga platforms in 1996. The game plays from a top-down perspective, from which the player controls a spherical battle droid, shooting their way through an enemy battleship. The player can equip the droid with weapon and tool enhancements, such as additional weapons, power-ups, extra lives, and guided missiles, through a special weapon shop shown between game levels.
