= Whale's Voyage =

1993 video game

- Developer(s): Neo Software
- Publisher(s): Flair Software
- Platform(s): Amiga CD32
- Release: February 1993
- Genre(s): Role-playing

Whale's Voyage, known in North America as Distant Frontiers, is a 1993 role-playing game developed by an Austrian company Neo Software and published by Flair Software. The game was programmed by Hannes Seifert and Niki Laber.

== Plot ==
The player is a space traveler who becomes stranded in space after making a bad deal purchasing the spacecraft "Whale". Left orbiting a remote planet, they must use trade and skill to upgrade the ship enough to escape.

== Reception ==
Amiga Format praised the title, despite describing it as huge, complicated, and daunting, and thought it lacked the depth and immersion of space adventures like BAT 2. Amiga Power thought the game offered CD32 owners something to play other than pinballers and platformers. Amiga Joker thought the game was a successful debut, and congratulated the Austrian video gaming industry. CU Amiga thought the game did not inspire confidence in the Austrian games market. Amiga Dream gave it a score of 85%.

In 1994, the game was voted by readers as #2 Best RPG in 1993 in the Amiga Joker magazine.

== Legacy ==
A sequel was released in 1995 entitled Whale's Voyage II: Die Übermacht. While never originally released in English, the sequel was unofficially translated into the language in 2018.
