= Quarantine II: Road Warrior =

1995 video game

Road Warrior
- Developer: Imagexcel
- Publisher: GameTek
- Platform: MS-DOS
- Release: NA: January 31, 1996
- Genres: Racing, first-person shooter
- Mode: Single-player

Road Warrior, released in some regions as Road Warrior: Quarantine II, is a 1996 racing and first-person shooter video game for MS-DOS created by Imagexcel and published by GameTek. It is the sequel to the cult classic 1994 video game, Quarantine. Road Warrior places the player back behind the wheel of a weaponized hovercab. The player traverses a post-apocalyptic desert landscape dotted with settlements for the player to visit while advancing the game's plot.

The game utilizes the same engine and basic gameplay as its predecessor with a larger focus on narrative, although the narrative shift into more conventional and linear structure was not well received by the reviewers.

Quarantine II received mixed reviews following its release. It was generally regarded as somewhat lack-luster compared to the previous game.

== Background ==
Following the success of 1994's cyberpunk hit Quarantine, Imagexcel and GameTek developed a sequel, whose name, and part of the plot, are also a nod to Mad Max 2 (which in the US was originally released as The Road Warrior).

== Plot ==
After escaping KEMO city with his weaponized hovercab at the end of Quarantine, protagonist Drake Edgewater finds himself a new life on the KEMO Plateau beyond the city's walls. After spending some time as a demolition derby contestant and hovercar racing driver, he is wanted dead by a criminal mutant overlord and is recruited to help a fight for a local group of rebels.

== Gameplay ==
Quarantine II: Road Warrior's gameplay is largely the same as that of its predecessor, with a few noteworthy changes. Gone is the original game's method of doling out story missions in between the player's regular taxi fares. In Road Warrior, missions are assigned to the player back-to-back. The player is also equipped with a weapon loadout at the start of each mission, rather than being responsible for purchasing their own weapons and upgrades as they were in the initial game. Also missing are the sprite-based randomly generated pedestrians which contributed to the first game's wacky cyberpunk aesthetic. Instead the player's missions are assigned by pre-rendered characters drawn in a comic book art style. One new feature is the addition of multiple points of view. The original Quarantine locked players into the cab's cockpit, showing a first-person view. On DOS, Road Warrior features the ability to enter a third-person point of view utilizing the function keys.

== Reception ==
Reception

Review scores
Publication	Score
Computer Gaming World	2.5/5 (DOS)
GameSpot	6/10
PC Gamer (US)	89/100
PC Games (DE)	65/100
PC Zone	61/100 (DOS)
PC Joker	65/100
Power Play	63/100
PC Player	60/100

Polish gaming magazine CD-Action reviewed the game on DOS. Enriched SVGA graphics and a 3D world that gives "the impression that something is always going on" earned the game positive remarks. Also noted are complaints of fickle controls holding the game back.

Computer Gaming World reviewed the PC version of the game, praising its comic book aesthetic, good soundtrack, and improved graphics. Listed in the "cons" section of the review was the loss of "many of Quarantine's finer elements", such as money management and weapon selection features found in the first game.

The game was reviewed for the GameSpot website, with the reviewer characterizing Road Warrior as a violent but uneven sequel to Quarantine (a game they consider interesting but imperfect). The reviewer notes that the sequel reasonably successfully attempts to fix its predecessor's most frustrating flaws while controversially discarding some of its most distinctive features. While braking and camera options are improved and the reviewer finds the addition of pleasant comic-book–style cutscenes and mission-based structure gives the game clearer direction, the removal of the original's fare-based economy and upgrade system is seen as a significant loss. Despite a helpful new a rear-view camera mode, vehicle handling remains difficult, undermining gameplay. The reviewer concludes that Road Warrior offers only modest, largely mindless entertainment and fails to compete effectively with more advanced contemporary 3D shooters, representing only a slight improvement over its predecessor.

Polish gaming magazine Gry Komputerowe reviewed a demo version of the game. The reviewer described the game as a continuation of GameTek's aggressive, action-oriented design philosophy, positioning the game as a high-intensity vehicular shooter rather than a conventional driving simulation. The review highlighted the game's fast pace, extensive arsenal, and varied environments—including urban areas, deserts, farms, and amusement parks—as well as improved audiovisual presentation in SVGA and new dynamic camera angles. Based on an expanded demo, the article concluded that fans of the first game would likely appreciate the sequel's increased scale and spectacle, while reserving final judgment until the full release.

The reviewer for the Swedish High Score Magazine opined that the game is "ok, but nothing special", giving it a score of 3 out 5.

In the PC Gamer review, the game is described as a deliberately outrageous, violent, and humor-driven sequel to Quarantine, trading subtlety for anarchic fun. The reviewer praises the game's irreverent tone, lampooning of political correctness, and energetic presentation, highlighting improved SVGA graphics, a wide variety of enemies, strong sound design, and an eclectic soundtrack spanning heavy metal to bluegrass. While the moment-to-moment destruction is described as exhilarating and often laugh-out-loud funny, the review notes some shortcomings, including missions that end too abruptly and the removal of Quarantine's fare-based economy, which previously added structure and urgency. Overall, Road Warrior is portrayed as an unapologetically tasteless but spirited action game that prioritizes spectacle, humor, and sheer destructive pleasure over realism or depth.

The German PC Games magazine reviewed the game as well. This review notes the game is much closer to an arcade-style shooter rather than a driving game. While the game premise and world building is interesting, the reviewer finds that the game's constant time pressure prevents them from being utilized fully, funding missions too brief, objective-driven, and repetitive, emphasizing reflexes over planning, which limits long-term engagement. The visual and audio effects are regarded as competent but not outstanding, while handling is praised as responsive and well-suited to keyboard controls. However, the lack of multiplayer support and limited mission variety are noted drawbacks. Overall, the review characterizes Road Warrior as a technically sound, entertaining action title that offers short-term excitement but little depth, reflected in its middling overall score (graphics 70%, sound 78%, handling 80% but overall, 65%).

The German PC Joker review characterizes Road Warrior as a vehicular action game clearly inspired by Mad Max, describing it as energetic and aggressive but ultimately unoriginal. The game is considered more varied than its predecessor, featuring new types of missions, such as demolition derbies and races. The reviewer finds the game graphics in general, and the use of comic strips rather than videos for interludes serviceable. The controls are deemed better suited to keyboard than joystick. Diverse soundtrack is singled out as a highlight. Overall, the review concludes that Road Warrior lacks major flaws but also fails to stand out, offering competent but unspectacular arcade-style action, reflected in its middling overall score of around 65%.

The German PC Player magazine also reviewed the game. The reviewer described it as a more action-oriented sequel to Quarantine, expanding the setting beyond a single city to multiple locations, including deserts, small towns, and unusual venues such as amusement parks. The game is praised for its high level of action, variety of missions, numerous weapons, and especially its energetic rock soundtrack, which the reviewer considers one of its highlights. Comic-style interludes between levels are also noted positively for advancing the story in a visually distinctive way, and the ability to save progress at any time is welcomed. Criticism centers primarily on the controls, which are described as clumsy and unresponsive. The graphics are considered uneven, despite SVGA implementation, with pixelated enemy sprites clashing with the 3D environments. The reviewer concludes that Road Warrior can be enjoyable for fans of aggressive, Mad Max-style action and arcade combat, but expresses doubts regarding its long-term appeal and replay value, and argues that stronger and similar driving and 3D action games are available at competitive prices.

In the PC Zone review, the game received a largely negative assessment, with the reviewer arguing that the sequel expands its setting and narrative framing without substantially improving gameplay. Although missions are spread across varied environments and presented in a comic strip style, they are described as mechanically repetitive, typically amounting to fast-paced, indiscriminate shooting with little room for strategy or skill. The hover-vehicle design is criticized for eliminating nuanced driving maneuvers, while the lack of progression systems such as upgrades or meaningful rewards reduces player motivation. Graphics, particularly in SVGA mode, are acknowledged as a relative strength, offering a good sense of speed, but this is not seen as sufficient to offset shallow mechanics and uninspired design; overall, the game is characterized as competent but forgettable, falling short as both a driving game and a 3D action title.

The game was reviewed for the German magazine Power Play. This review presents Road Warrior as an expanded but uneven sequel to Quarantine. The reviewer notes improvements over the original, particularly a more structured mission system, additional combat options (including rear-facing weapons, anti-air combat, and large-scale environmental destruction), and enhanced SVGA graphics. New interface aids such as a city map and directional indicators are also highlighted as practical additions. Comic-style cutscenes are praised for their originality and visual flair, although the reviewer noted they lead to visual inconsistencies, with comic-style character portraits clashing with the in-game 3D environments. The review is largely critical of the game's execution. The removal of economic mechanics from the first game—such as earning money, upgrading weapons, and repairing or customizing the taxi, which is now automatically fixed after missions—is seen as an unnecessary simplification. The controls are described as awkward and imprecise, and the reviewer noted minor graphical glitches occur during collisions. Overall, the article concludes that while Road Warrior improves on its predecessor in scope and presentation, it fails to advance far enough after a year-long gap and ultimately falls short of expectations. The reviewer scored the game's graphics and audio at 70%, but the game itself at 63%.

The game was reviewed for Czech magazine Score, receiving a score of 8 out of 10, with the reviewer praising the graphics and the player ability to destroy entire structures like buildings.

The game was also briefly reviewed for the Polish Świat Gier Komputerowych magazine. The reviewer noted the game is mostly similar to its predecessor, with improved SVGA graphics, better audio, and a new, logical mission structure. The reviewer also praised the comic strip-like interludes, but noted the existence of an annoying bug related to NPCs leaving the map area after collisions, which can prevent completion of some missions.

In a retrospective feature from 2019, Rock Paper Shotgun characterized the game as a disappointing sequel that abandoned many of the elements that made the original Quarantine distinctive, notably, loss of freedom found in the gameplay of the original. Whereas the first game emphasized open-ended exploration, emergent encounters, and a strong sense of place within its prison-city setting, Road Warrior replaced this freedom with a rigid, mission-driven structure and linear progression. Upgrades were now granted through scripted advancement rather than earned organically, environments were simplified into grid-like layouts, and the game's tone shifted from dark satire to exaggerated comedy. The article argues that these changes resulted in a game that failed to recapture the original's charm, despite occasional memorable moments such as its rural environments.
