= Dark Colony =

1997 video game

- Developer: Alternative Reality Technologies
- Publishers: NA: Strategic Simulations; EU: Take-Two Interactive
- Producer: Rick E. White
- Composer: Barry Blum
- Platforms: Windows, Mac OS
- Release: August 1997; 1998 (Mac OS)
- Genre: Real-time strategy
- Modes: Single-player, multiplayer

Dark Colony is a real-time strategy video game developed by Alternative Reality Technologies and published by Strategic Simulations. The game was released on Microsoft Windows in August 1997 and on Mac OS the following year. An expansion pack titled The Council Wars was released in 1998 for Windows only.

== Overview ==
The game is set on a fictional Mars colony - the so-called "Dark Colony" - in the year 2137. Humans have discovered a "remarkable energy source" by the name of Petra-7 on the red planet. Figuring they'd rather not choke on the atmosphere of Mars whilst mining Petra-7, the Humans begin terraforming the planet. At the start of the game the project has produced jungles and deserts habitable by people. All seems to be going well, until the Taar show up. The Taar are aliens from a scattered and dying race looking for a new homeworld, and Mars seems to be good fit. Before they can move in though, they seek to get rid of the humans.

The game consists of two campaigns where players can either play as the humans, commanding a colonization force from Pan Luma Industries (one of the Earth corporations along with Aerogen and Stratus who are in charge of the Mars project) whose goal is to defend against and defeat the alien threat, or as the Taar, where players have to defeat the human presence on Mars and claim it as their own.

== Balance ==
Both the human and alien armies have almost entirely mirrored units that differ mostly in appearance. The few differences between races are that the range of the heavy assault units is bigger by 1 for humans in exchange for speed, the range of alien sniper units is bigger by 1, and alien defense turrets have less range and less damage. However, there are two aspects to the gameplay that can sway the tide of battle: effective use of artifacts and day/night cycle. Dark Colony is one of the first RTS to add day/night cycle as a tactical consideration, as the Taar see much better during night time and also deal a little more damage and Humans see much better during day time while dealing some more damage in daylight.

== Dark Colony: The Council Wars ==
Dark Colony: The Council Wars is an expansion pack to the 1997 video game Dark Colony, published on January 8, 1998.

New things players can find are crashed flying saucers, Taar fortress markings, and a revisit of Area 51, featuring rattlesnakes. Apart from that, familiar terrain types have a slightly different appearance, and new ambient sounds.

Gameplay involves eradicating humans or the alien Taars, depending on the chosen side.
