= Rockstar Toronto =

Canadian video game developer

Rockstar Games Toronto ULC
- Trade name: Rockstar Toronto
- Formerly: Imagexcel (198?–1995); Alternative Reality Technologies (1995–1997); Take-Two Interactive Software Canada (1997–1999); Rockstar Canada (1999–2002)
- Type: Subsidiary
- Industry: Video games
- Founded: Early 1980s
- Headquarters: Oakville, Ontario, Canada
- Key people: Kevin Hoare (studio director)
- Parent: GameTek (1995–1997); Take-Two Interactive (1997–1999); Rockstar Games (1999–present)

Rockstar Toronto (Rockstar Games Toronto ULC; formerly Imagexcel, Alternative Reality Technologies, and Rockstar Canada) is a Canadian video game developer and a studio of Rockstar Games based in Oakville, Ontario. The company was established as Imagexcel in the early 1980s and developed more than fifteen games, including Quarantine, until 1995. Quarantine's publisher, GameTek, bought the studio's assets in March 1995 to establish Alternative Reality Technologies. Take-Two Interactive acquired the studio in July 1997 and moved it to its Rockstar Games label as Rockstar Canada in 1999. Rockstar Canada subsequently developed Grand Theft Auto: London 1969, an expansion pack for Grand Theft Auto, as well as several ports for Rockstar Games. With Take-Two's acquisition of Rockstar Vancouver in 2002, Rockstar Canada was renamed Rockstar Toronto. The studio developed the 2005 game The Warriors, based on the 1979 film of the same name, and further ports, including the Windows versions of Grand Theft Auto IV, Grand Theft Auto: Episodes from Liberty City, Max Payne 3, and Grand Theft Auto V. In July 2012, Rockstar Toronto absorbed Rockstar Vancouver.

== History ==
Rockstar Toronto was established as Imagexcel in the early 1980s, "before the time of He-Man". The studio developed roughly fifteen games across multiple systems until 1995. It began developing a proprietary game engine in 1993, as well as a complementary game in collaboration with GameTek in December that year. Rod Humble, as GameTek's executive producer, initially wrote a script titled Bloods that revolved around gang warfare. When the company sent a revision thereof to Imagexcel, the studio reworked the concept into what became Quarantine. Humble considered the new version a "far superior game". In October 1994, Imagexcel comprised the programmer and managing partner Kevin Hoare, the programmers Ed Zolnieryk and Andy Brownbill, and the artists Greg Bick and Ray Larabie. GameTek released the game in the same month. On 9 March 1995, the publisher announced its acquisition of Imagexcel's assets through a newly founded subsidiary, Alternative Reality Technologies. The transaction included Quarantine's engine, which GameTek intended to use in other games. Hoare, Zolnieryk, Bick, and Larabie formed the core of GameTek's Canadian development operations. After the acquisition, the studio was also referred to as GameTek Canada.

Take-Two Interactive bought several assets from GameTek, including Alternative Reality Technologies and the distribution rights for its game Dark Colony, in July 1997. The studio, which was rebranded Take-Two Interactive Software Canada, was working on the Dark Colony expansion pack The Council Wars at this time. The studio iterated through several ideas, including an open-world World War II game set in France, until it was tasked with developing Grand Theft Auto: London 1969, an expansion pack for Grand Theft Auto, in 1998. By this time, the studio had relocated to an office underneath a fruit and flower shop. In 1999, it became part of Take-Two's Rockstar Games label as Rockstar Canada. Rockstar Games released London 1969 in April 1999, followed by the freeware prequel London 1961 in July. Rockstar Canada further developed ports of Rockstar Games's Oni and Max Payne for the PlayStation 2 that were released in 2001. When Take-Two acquired Barking Dog Studios and renamed it Rockstar Vancouver in August 2002, Rockstar Canada was renamed Rockstar Toronto to avert confusion between the two. At the same time, Take-Two announced that Rockstar Toronto was working on a video game adaptation of the 1979 film The Warriors. The eponymous game was first shown at E3 2005 before being released in October that year. A spiritual successor, internally known as We Are the Mods, was planned at the time. Continuing to develop ports, Rockstar Toronto brought Manhunt 2 and Bully: Scholarship Edition to the Wii, as well as Grand Theft Auto IV, Grand Theft Auto: Episodes from Liberty City, and Max Payne 3 to Windows.

In July 2012, Rockstar Games announced that Rockstar Toronto would move into larger, custom-built offices in Oakville, Ontario. Rockstar Vancouver was merged into Rockstar Toronto and the former's thirty-five employees were given the option to relocate to Rockstar Toronto or any other Rockstar Games studio. The Government of Ontario contributed CA$2 million to this expansion. Jennifer Kolbe, Rockstar Games's vice-president of publishing and operations, stated that creating a single Canadian team would "make for a powerful creative force on future projects" while making room for fifty new positions at the studio. In November 2012, Rockstar Toronto's legal entity, Rockstar Toronto Inc., was continued from Ontario into British Columbia as Rockstar Games Toronto Inc. and then converted into Rockstar Games Toronto ULC, an unlimited liability corporation.

Rockstar Toronto later ported Grand Theft Auto V to Windows. This version was initially scheduled to be released alongside the PlayStation 4 and Xbox One versions in 2014. The port was delayed to April 2015, which the studio attributed to optimizations and the integration of a built-in video editor, which is exclusive to this release. Rockstar Games referred to the Windows port as the game's "ultimate" edition. On 24 December 2020, CA$66,000 worth of newly delivered computer equipment and accessories were stolen from Rockstar Toronto's offices. The incident was the first in a string of robberies in Oakville that continued until 23 January 2021. The suspect, a 30-year-old woman, was arrested on 25 January. In October 2025, during the development of Grand Theft Auto VI, Rockstar Games fired three Rockstar Toronto employees (alongside thirty-one at Rockstar North) who had been active in a Discord group discussing unionization efforts. Rockstar Games labelled their actions as "gross misconduct" that leaked company secrets, which Nasr Ahmed, a staff organizer at the Communications Workers of America's Canadian branch, called "patently false". In December, Ahmed organized a solidarity march outside the Rockstar Toronto offices. Rockstar Toronto's work on Grand Theft Auto VI, which was released in November 2026, included principally designing the population of the game world.

== Games developed ==
List of games developed by Rockstar Toronto, 1994–present
Year	Title	Platform(s)	Publisher(s)	Notes
1988	Techno Cop	Amiga, Amstrad CPC, Apple II, Atari ST, Commodore 64, MS-DOS, Sega Genesis, ZX Spectrum	Gremlin Graphics, U.S. Gold, RazorSoft	Co-developed with Gray Matter
1990	The Ultimate Ride	Amiga, Atari ST	Mindscape	Co-developed with Gray Matter
1994	Quarantine	3DO Interactive Multiplayer, MS-DOS, PlayStation, Sega Saturn	GameTek	
1996	Quarantine II: Road Warrior	MS-DOS	Mindscape, GameTek	
1997	Dark Colony	Classic Mac OS, Windows	Strategic Simulations, Take-Two Interactive	
1999	Grand Theft Auto: London 1969	MS-DOS, PlayStation, Windows	Rockstar Games	
1999	Grand Theft Auto: London 1961	MS-DOS, Windows	Rockstar Games	
2001	Oni	PlayStation 2	Rockstar Games	Port development
2001	Max Payne	PlayStation 2	Rockstar Games	Port development
2005	The Warriors	PlayStation 2, PlayStation Portable, Xbox	Rockstar Games	
2007	Manhunt 2	Wii	Rockstar Games	Port development
2008	Bully: Scholarship Edition	Wii	Rockstar Games	Port development
2008	Grand Theft Auto IV	Windows	Rockstar Games	Port development
2010	Grand Theft Auto: Episodes from Liberty City	Windows	Rockstar Games	Port development
2012	Max Payne 3	Windows	Rockstar Games	Port development
2015	Grand Theft Auto V	Windows	Rockstar Games	Port development
2018	Red Dead Redemption 2	PlayStation 4, Stadia, Windows, Xbox One	Rockstar Games	
2026	Grand Theft Auto VI	PlayStation 5, Xbox Series X/S	Rockstar Games	

=== Cancelled ===
- We Are the Mods
