= Teraburst =

1998 video game

Teraburst is a 'machine gun shooter' arcade game (a specific type of light-gun game) released by Konami in 1998.

Teraburst was exhibited at the February 1998 AOU Show.

== Story ==
The game is set in 2017. An invasion of UFOs has appeared and started to invade Earth. The player is charged to blast the aliens back into outer space with a hand-held, recoiling machine gun, homing missiles and Napalm bombs. The game progresses through four stages of aliens.
