= Rockstar Vienna =

Austrian video game developer

Rockstar Productions GmbH
- Trade name: Rockstar Vienna (2003–2006)
- Formerly: Neo Software Produktions GmbH (1993–2003)
- Type: Subsidiary
- Industry: Video games
- Founded: 4 January 1993; 33 years ago in Hirtenberg, Austria
- Founders: Peter Baustädter; Niki Laber; Hannes Seifert
- Defunct: 11 May 2006
- Fate: Dissolved
- Headquarters: Vienna, Austria
- Key people: Niki Laber (managing director); Hannes Seifert (managing director)
- Number of employees: 110 (2006)
- Parent: Computec Media (1999–2000); Gameplay.com (2000–2001); Take-Two Interactive (2001–2003); Rockstar Games (2003–2006)

Rockstar Vienna (Rockstar Productions GmbH; formerly Neo Software Produktions GmbH) was an Austrian video game developer and a studio of Rockstar Games based in Vienna. Peter Baustädter, Niki Laber, and Hannes Seifert founded the studio as Neo Software in January 1993 as they neared the completion of Whale's Voyage. The game led Neo Software to early success, as did 1994's The Clue!, which sold over a million copies, and enabled the company to relocate from Seifert's house in Hirtenberg to offices in Vienna. After Neo Software's Alien Nations sold more than a million copies in 1999, Computec Media acquired a majority stake in the company, seeking for it to produce online games. It then sold the studio and several other businesses to Gameplay.com in February 2000, which sold Neo Software to Take-Two Interactive in January 2001 as part of a subsidiary exchange.

Under Take-Two, Neo Software mostly developed ports, starting with Max Payne for the Xbox. The studio was integrated with Take-Two's Rockstar Games label in January 2003 as Rockstar Vienna, bringing its Max Payne 2: The Fall of Max Payne, Grand Theft Auto III, and Grand Theft Auto: Vice City to consoles. The studio worked on Manhunt 2 from January 2004 until May 2006, when the company was abruptly closed as a cost reduction measure. Rockstar Vienna had become the largest developer in Austria by that time, and its disestablishment left 110 people out of work. Manhunt 2 was completed at Rockstar London, omitting all Rockstar Vienna credits upon release.

== History ==
=== Early years (1993–1999) ===
A former Neo Software logo

Rockstar Vienna was founded as Neo Software by Peter Baustädter, Niki Laber, and Hannes Seifert. Laber and Seifert had met as freelancers at a computer school, where they quickly decided to work on video games. Seifert's 1989 game Der verlassene Planet (lit. 'The Abandoned Planet') was the first commercial video game release from Austria. After five years of independent work in the video game industry, Baustädter, Laber, and Seifert were nearing the completion of Whale's Voyage. While meeting at a coffeehouse near Wien Westbahnhof railway station, they decided to build a company around the game, establishing Neo Software on 4 January 1993. Its offices were set up in Seifert's house in Hirtenberg, a small village south of Vienna. Laber and Seifert became the joint managing directors. Flair Software released Whale's Voyage in February 1993. The game's success allowed Neo Software to begin moving to the Business Park Vienna in 1994, which made it easier to hire international employees. The Clue!, released later that year, became the company's first game to sell more than 1 million copies, accelerating the relocation.

In the following two years, Neo Software worked on Prototype, Dark Universe, Whale's Voyage II, and Cedric (all released in 1995), as well as Mutation of J.B., Spherical Worlds, Black Viper, and Fightin' Spirit (all 1996). During 1996, the company discontinued its publishing activities and established a consulting branch, Neo Consulting. By 1997, Baustädter had left the company for Digital Domain while remaining a shareholder. While developing Rent-a-Hero in 1997, Neo Software's first year without a release, the company underwent structural changes to improve its development capabilities and strengthened relationships with publishers for future releases. Rent-a-Hero was released in 1998. The studio worked with the nascent Austrian company JoWooD to release Alien Nations in 1999, which sold over 1 million copies.

=== Acquisitions (1999–2004) ===
Computec Media, a German media company that produced magazines and online games, announced on 1 June 1999 that it had agreed to purchase a 51% majority stake in Neo Software, citing the success of Rent-a-Hero and Alien Nations as a motive. The deal was to close by the end of the year, with the studio to receive Computec Media shares worth DM 2 million. The company expected Neo Software and its 11 employees to develop two online games and generate DM 7 million in revenue each year. However, it proceeded to sell off Neo Software, alongside three other subsidiaries, to Gameplay.com in February 2000 for £11.8 million in cash and £35.8 million in Gameplay.com shares. Under its new owner, Neo Software had commenced work on the Sid Meier's Pirates! spin-off Online Pirates (or Pirates! Online) by September that year. In October, Gameplay.com acquired Toga Holdings, the parent of Pixel Broadband Studios, from Take-Two Interactive. Alongside paying cash and shares, Gameplay.com entered into a "joint exploitation agreement" that allowed Take-Two to purchase Neo Software. The studio's valuation of US$17.3 million was pre-paid in this transaction. Take-Two completed its acquisition of Neo Software on 31 January 2001, paying a nominal £1 and assuming $808,000 in liabilities. The company envisioned the studio producing German localisations in addition to developing games.

Later in 2001, JoWooD published Neo Software's sequel to The Clue!, The Sting!. As part of Take-Two, Neo Software developed the Xbox port of Max Payne, which was released in December 2001. Online Pirates was still in development in late 2002. At the time, Seifert commented that Neo Software, which now had 40 employees, saw online games as a "market of the future". However, he lamented that the lack of widespread broadband connections in households at the time made games like Online Pirates unviable as mass-market products. On Neo Software's tenth anniversary in January 2003, Take-Two integrated the studio with the Rockstar Games label as Rockstar Vienna. The legal entity, Neo Software Produktions GmbH, was consequently renamed Rockstar Productions GmbH. The studio continued developing ports, bringing Max Payne 2: The Fall of Max Payne to the Xbox and PlayStation 2, as well as Grand Theft Auto III and Grand Theft Auto: Vice City to the Xbox.

=== Manhunt 2 and closure (2004–2006) ===
In January 2004, Rockstar Vienna began work on what would become Manhunt 2, the sequel to 2003's Manhunt. On the morning of 11 May 2006, Take-Two closed down Rockstar Vienna's facilities and fired all employees without prior notice. In a blog post, the Rockstar Vienna level designer Jurie Horneman described how he arrived at the studio to work, only to be turned away by security guards. With 110 employees before the closure, Rockstar Vienna had been the largest video game developer in Austria. The move was described as a cost cutting measure. Rockstar Games had too many studios and its expenses were too high, and the decision to close Rockstar Vienna was made easier because it was its only studio in a non-English-speaking country. Rockstar Games stated that employees were "offered packages in accordance with Austrian law, as well as other job opportunities within Take-Two and Rockstar Games where possible". Laber later described the closure as "completely fair", noting that the severance packages far exceeded the legal minimum.

The development of Manhunt 2 was shifted to Rockstar London and the game was released in October 2007. Following the release, Horneman, who had been a producer for the game while at Rockstar Vienna, noticed that the game's credits lacked all names of the Rockstar Vienna employees who had worked on the game before the studio's closure. In a blog post listing all 89 missing credits, he stated that "the majority of the work we did at Rockstar Vienna is in the released game. Rearranged and modified, but it's there." He added that he was "disappointed and outraged that Rockstar Games tries to pretend that Rockstar Vienna and the work we did on Manhunt 2 never happened – the work of over 50 people, who put years of their lives into the project, trying to make the best game they could".

=== Legacy ===
Rockstar Vienna's demise prompted the creation of many smaller studios in the Vienna area. In January 2007, Seifert and Laber, as well as Jürgen Goeldner, announced the formation of Games That Matter. By the end of that month, the studio mostly comprised former Rockstar Vienna staff. Koch Media bought the studio in August 2007 and incorporated it into the Deep Silver label as Deep Silver Vienna. It was Koch Media's first acquisition of a development studio. Deep Silver Vienna's first game was Cursed Mountain, developed in association with Sproing Interactive and released for the Wii in 2009. Laber left the studio in December 2009 and Seifert announced his intent to leave the company by 31 January 2010. On that day, Koch Media disestablished Deep Silver Vienna and laid off its 20 employees, citing that it was necessary to concentrate its operations at its Munich headquarters in the face of the "overall economic situation". The project it had in development at the time, Ride to Hell, was handed to Eutechnyx. Seifert later acted as the studio head for IO Interactive from 2010 until February 2017, while Laber joined Socialspiel, a Viennese social network game company founded by former Rockstar Vienna and Deep Silver Vienna staff, in August 2012.

== Games developed ==
=== As Neo Software ===
List of games developed by Rockstar Vienna, 1993–2001
Year	Title	Platform(s)	Publisher(s)	Notes
1993	Whale's Voyage	Amiga, Amiga CD32, MS-DOS	Flair Software	
1994	The Clue!	Amiga, Amiga CD32, MS-DOS	Kompart UK, Max Design	Co-developed with And Avoid Panic by
1995	Prototype	MS-DOS	Max Design	Co-developed with Surprise! Productions
1995	Dark Universe	MS-DOS	Max Design	Co-developed with Martin
1995	Whale's Voyage II	Amiga, Amiga CD32, MS-DOS	Neo Software	
1995	Cedric	Amiga	Neo Software	Co-developed with Alcatraz
1996	Mutation of J.B.	MS-DOS	Neo Software	Co-developed with Invention
1996	Spherical Worlds	Amiga	Neo Software	Co-developed with 4-Matted
1996	Black Viper	Amiga, Amiga CD32	Neo Software	Co-developed with Lightshock Software
1996	Fightin' Spirit	Amiga, Amiga CD32	Neo Software	Co-developed with Lightshock Software
1998	Rent-a-Hero	Windows	THQ, Magic Bytes	
1999	Alien Nations	Windows	JoWooD	
2001	The Sting!	Windows	JoWooD	
2001	Max Payne	Xbox	Rockstar Games	Port development

=== As Rockstar Vienna ===
List of games developed by Rockstar Vienna, 2003–2007
Year	Title	Platform(s)	Publisher(s)	Notes
2003	Max Payne 2: The Fall of Max Payne	PlayStation 2, Xbox	Rockstar Games	Port development
2003	Grand Theft Auto III	Xbox	Rockstar Games	Port development
2003	Grand Theft Auto: Vice City	Xbox	Rockstar Games	Port development
2007	Manhunt 2	PlayStation 2, PlayStation Portable, Wii, Windows	Rockstar Games	Development completed by Rockstar London

=== Cancelled ===
- Online Pirates / Pirates! Online
