= The Sting! =

2001 video game

- US cover
- Developer: Neo Software
- Publisher: JoWooD Productions
- Platform: PC
- Release: PC: NA: 1 July 2001; EU: 19 July 2001
- Genres: Strategy, Adventure
- Mode: Single-player

The Sting! (released in German-speaking regions as Der Clou! 2, in Russian as Ва-Банк!) is a strategy/adventure video game developed by Neo Software and released by JoWooD Productions on 1 July 2001. It is the sequel to 1994's The Clue! (known as Der Clou! in German-speaking regions).

== Plot and gameplay ==
The player assumes the role of Matt Tucker, a famous burglar who has just come out of prison in the city of Fortune Hills. In the beginning, Matt is reduced to a small-time crook who has to work his way back to his former glory. After performing several burglaries, alone or with the help of accomplices he has met at various locations around the city, he collects loot and fame. By selling the loot he is able to buy better tools to use in increasingly challenging missions, with the ultimate goal being the Ministry of Light.

The gameplay consists of two modes, the planning mode and the live mode. The planning is done from Matt's apartment where actions and movements are carefully laid out. Then by going "live" the player will find out if the plan works or if everyone has gotten caught. Different locations can include patrolling guards and police, security systems, locked doors and cabinets and other obstacles. At the same time, Matt's different tools are useful in different situations as well as making different levels of noise.

The in-game map of the city of Fortune Hills

The Sting! was one of the first third-person 3D games to allow the player to freely roam a city, with a transportation system (taxis) to facilitate this, many buildings he can explore and buy tools, meet accomplices or observe, prior to planning a burglary.

== Development ==
The name The Sting! comes from the fact that the 1973 film The Sting has the German title "Der Clou". So when the game was called "Der Clou" in Austria, the English translation became The Sting.

== Reception ==
The game received mixed reviews by the critics. On Metacritic it has a score of 73% based on reviews from 9 critics. Most of the reviewers praised the light-hearted tone of the game and the unique theme of it. IGN stated "I haven't played a game like this in a long time... or ever really I guess. Funny cartoony little games are much fewer and far between on the PC nowadays. While there are a share of those cartoony style games set in 2D landscapes, you'll have to look pretty hard to find more than a couple that take advantage of the third dimension to really bring colorful and silly worlds to life. Not only does the Sting do this fairly well, but it also provides some interesting gameplay"

However, a number of problems held back the game's score on multiple occasions. Reviewers noted the clipping problems of the graphics engine, the slow pace of the game and problematic pathfinding AI as the most serious problems with the title.

Reception

Aggregate scores
Aggregator	Score
GameRankings	62%
Metacritic	73%

Review scores
Publication	Score
Eurogamer	6/10
GameSpot	7/10
IGN	7.5/10
PC PowerPlay	73%
