= Hover Ace =

2001 video game

- Developer: GSC Game World
- Publisher: Russobit-M
- Release: 2001

Hover Ace is a 2001 video game developed by GSC Game World and published by Russobit-M.

== Development ==
According to Oleg Yavorsky, PR-manager of Hover Ace, "The biggest challenge was to create and balance the physical model of vehicles and game environment. It also took quite some time to optimize the engine for working with open areas."

== Critical reception ==
PC World Poland gave the game a rating of 4/5 stars. Igray.ru wrote the game was "well balanced and smoothly made". Gamezone concluded it was a " slightly above average title". 7Wolf negatively compared it to the "purely military games" of GSC Game World.
