= Spinner (Blade Runner) =

Fictional vehicle

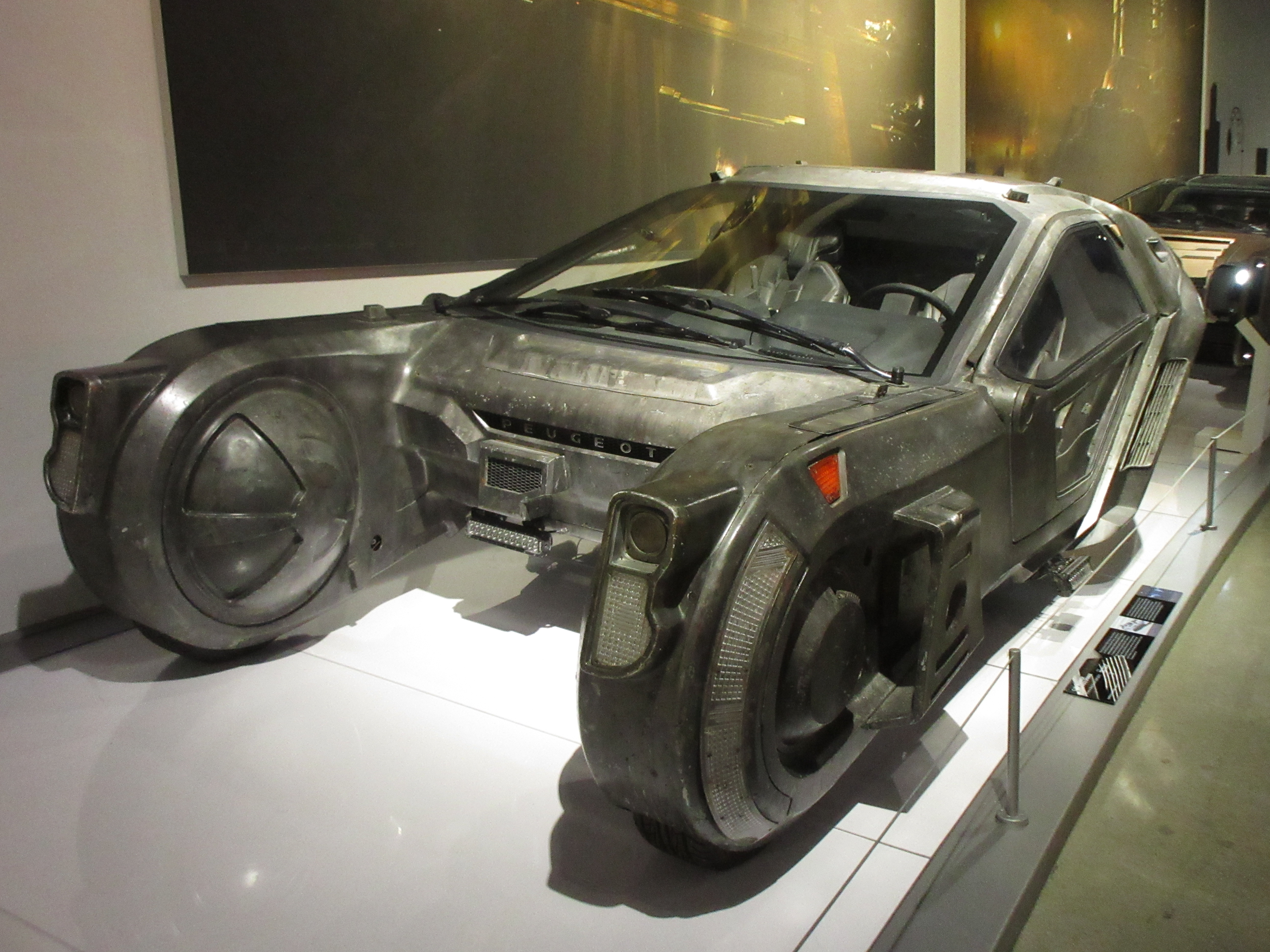
Spinner from Blade Runner 2049 on display at the Petersen Automotive Museum, Los Angeles

Spinner is the generic term for the fictional flying cars used in the film Blade Runner. A spinner can be driven as a ground-based vehicle, take off vertically, hover, and cruise using jet propulsion much like the Vertical Take-Off and Landing (VTOL) aircraft currently in use today. They are used extensively by the police to patrol and survey the population, and it is clear that despite restrictions wealthy people can acquire spinner licenses. The vehicle was conceived and designed by Syd Mead and has been "replicated" in subsequent films such as Back to the Future Part II, The Fifth Element, and the Star Wars prequel trilogy. These films have the popular vision of flying cars, and people use spinners like traditional cars; in Blade Runner, the flying cars substitute for helicopters and very light jets.

Designer Mead has described the spinner as an aerodyne – a vehicle which directs air downward to create lift, though press kits for the film stated that the spinner was propelled by three engines: "conventional internal combustion, jet and anti-gravity".

A spinner is currently on permanent exhibit at the Science Fiction Museum and Hall of Fame in Seattle, WA.

== List of appearances ==
=== In-universe ===
- Blade Runner (1982) – Spinners are seen prominently in Blade Runner. Deckard and Gaff are seen riding in police spinners, and other various spinners driven by the "general" public, Very Important Person public are seen flying through the city.
- Trancers (1985) – The sedan used by Deckard can be seen in a repair shop.
- Solar Crisis (1990) – A repainted police spinner is used.
- Soldier (1998) – A spinner can be seen in a pile of wrecked vehicles in one scene.
- Blade Runner 2049 (2017) – Officer K and other members of the LAPD are seen riding in police spinners, and other various spinners driven by the "general" public, VIP public are seen flying through the city. Certain spinners are also being used by the members of the Wallace Corporation. The spinner flown by Officer K was branded as a Peugeot as a part of a marketing deal that later resulted in a lawsuit between Peugeot and Alcon Entertainment.

=== Cameos and out-of-universe appearances ===
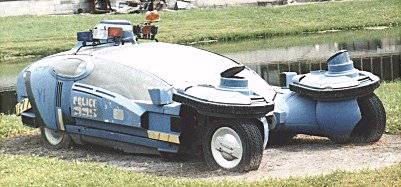
Police package spinner prop car on display outside Disney-MGM Studios.

- A spinner and the sedan used by Deckard appear in the music video for the Earth, Wind & Fire song "Magnetic".
- The video game Snatcher, itself influenced by Blade Runner, features "turbocycles" that are similar to spinners.
- The film Back to the Future Part II paid homage to the spinner from Blade Runner in that a garishly repainted spinner can be seen parked on a street.
- Another tribute to the Blade Runner spinner can be seen at various points in the Star Wars films: they are seen in The Phantom Menace and Attack of the Clones. The homage was made in part because of the similarities between the dense cityscape of Blade Runner's Los Angeles and the ecumenopolis planet Coruscant seen in the Star Wars films.
