= Remote Control Productions (German company) =

German video game production company

remote control productions
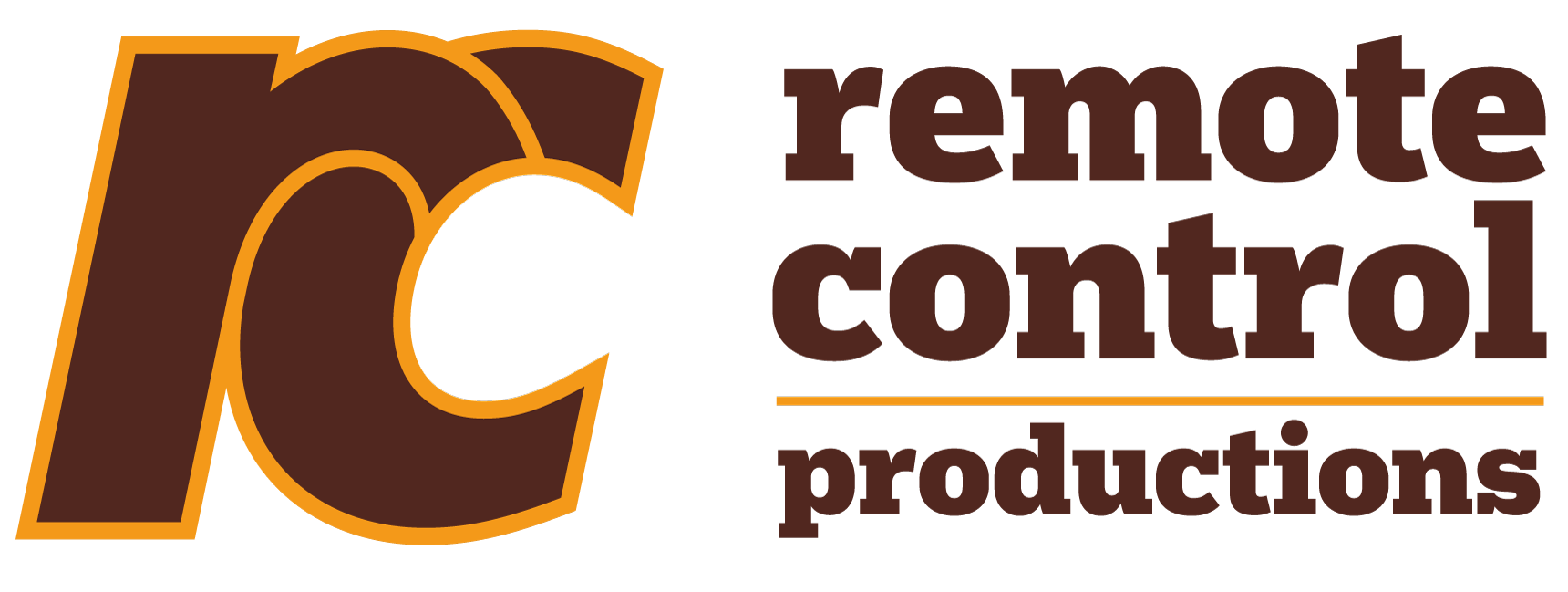
- Industry: Video games
- Founded: 2005
- Founder: Hendrik Lesser
- Headquarters: Munich, Bavaria, Germany
- Number of employees: 450+
- Website: rcp.family

Remote Control Productions GmbH (RCP; stylized in lowercase) is a Munich-based, independent games production house with a network of 14 development studios in Germany, Austria, Finland and Pakistan. It includes Chimera Entertainment, Stillalive Studios among others, having produced more than 350 projects such as Angry Birds Epic. The teams have shipped over 400 projects, including Premium and F2P games for Windows, Xbox, PlayStation, Switch, Mobile, VR and Web-based platforms since 2005.

== History ==
In 2005, the production house was founded as ML Enterprises GmbH under the leadership of Hendrik Lesser and Marc Möhring. Remote Control Productions' focus lies on the support of developers, publishers, corporations and institutions for mediation, realisation and production of game projects, as well as financing, consulting, development and coaching of start-ups and studios from the games industry.

In 2006, Lesser founded the developer studio Chimera Entertainment along with Alexander Kehr and Christian Kluckner, which meanwhile became the biggest studio of the Remote Control Productions developer network with more than 40 employees. In September 2008, ML Enterprises was renamed to Remote Control Productions. In the same year, Remote Control Productions and Chimera Entertainment produced their first own game project: the real-time strategy game Windchaser (Windows).

In the meantime, Remote Control Productions co-founded under the aggregation of the RCP developer family further studios such as Brightside Games (2010), Wolpertinger Games (2010), it Matters Games (2012) and expanded the developer merger for the studios TG Nord (2012), Stillalive Studios (2012) and Zeitland (2012).

Remote Control Productions also established with GamesInFlames an own publishing company in 2010. In late 2014, the subsidiary GAMIFY now! was founded, which is specialized in "gamification" and serious games. Austrian developers DoubleSmith and REDOX Game Labs and the Nuremberg-based developer studio NeoBird are part of the Remote Control Productions developer family since 2014 and 2015, respectively. In the beginning of 2016, Remote Control Productions opened an office in Kotka, Finland with Jyri Partanen as managing director.

== Produced games ==
From 2005 till 2007, Remote Control Productions supported Collision Studios' developer team during the development of the first-person shooter game Red Ocean, as well as the production of Legend: Hand of God with publisher dtp entertainment, and Crashday with publisher Atari Europe. In 2008, Remote Control Productions produced the real-time strategy game Windchaser (Windows) with Chimera Entertainment. In association with Bigpointe, Remote Control Productions and Chimera Entertainment developed the strategy game Warstory – Europe in Flames, a Microsoft Silverlight browser MMO that takes place in World War II.

Releases such as Coreplay's Ion Assault and Brightside Games' Zeit², as well as Chimera Entertainment's Happy Hills (iOS) and Demolition Dash followed in 2011. Remote Control Productions participated in the production of the first interactive audiobook, Audigent's Raumzeit Folge 1: Der verbotene Sektor. In 2012, several Chimera Entertainment productions followed – Mission: Genesis, Skylancer and Word Wonders, which has won the GCGA in the category "Best Mobile Game of the Year" in 2013.

Along with Stillalive Studios, Remote Control Productions completed a Kickstarter campaign for their game Son of Nor in May 2013, which released in April 2015. In June 2014, Remote Control Productions released the Angry Birds game Angry Birds Epic in co-production with developer Chimera Entertainment and partner Rovio Entertainment. The hidden object game Mystery of Neuschwanstein, developed by Chimera Entertainment and funded by the FilmFernsehFonds Bayern, followed in February 2015

Year	Game	Platform(s)	Genre	Studio	Publisher
2006	Red Ocean	PC	First-person shooter	Collision Studios	Anaconda
2008	Windchaser	PC	Strategy RPG	Chimera Entertainment	dtp interactive
2009	Wiesn Fever	iOS	Puzzle	Chimera Entertainment	-
2009	Farm Fever	iOS	Puzzle	Chimera Entertainment	-
2009	Ion Assault	XBLA	Shooter	Chimera Entertainment	RTL Interactive
2009	Gehirntraining mit Dr. Kawashima	PC, Mac	Puzzle	Chimera Entertainment	-
2010	Memory (HD)	iOS	Puzzle	Chimera Entertainment	Ravensburger Digital
2010	Warstory – Europe in Flames	Browser	Strategy MMO	Chimera Entertainment	Bigpoint
2010	Greed: Black Border	PC	Hack 'n' slash	ClockStone	Headup Games
2011	Zeit²	PC, XBLA	Shooter	Brightside Game	Ubisoft
2011	Demolition Dash	Android, iOS	Jump 'n' run	Chimera Entertainment	Dreamfab
2011	Happy Hills	iOS	Physical puzzle	Chimera Entertainment	Dreamfab
2012	Skylancer – Battle for Horizon	Browser	Strategy MMO	Chimera Entertainment	Pro7Games
2011	Bridge Constructor	Android, iOS, PC	Physical puzzle	ClockStone	Headup Games
2012	Word Wonders – The Tower of Babel	iOS	Word puzzle	Chimera Entertainment	Dreamfab
2012	Sara's Cooking Class	Android, iOS	Cooking app	Chimera Entertainment	Spil Games
2012	Towers & Dungeons	iOS	Towerbuilder	Chimera Entertainment	Ravensburger Digital
2012	Mission: Genesis	Browser	Strategy MMO	Chimera Entertainment	dtp interactive
2012	Happy Hills	Android	Physical puzzle	Chimera Entertainment	The9
2013	Rally the World	Android, Browser, iOS	Racer	Brightside Games	Aperto/VW
2013	Warstory Europe	Browser	Strategy MMO	Chimera Entertainment	RNTS
2013	My Dolphin Show	Android, iOS	Arcade	itMatters Games	Spil Games
2013	Sheep Shack	iOS	Action-puzzle	Brightside Games	Just a Game
2013	Hoppetee!	iOS, Android	Jump 'n' run	Chimera Entertainment	Brigit Stock Verlag
2013	Sidekick Cycle	iOS, Android	Downhill racer	itMatters Games	GGI
2013	Little Islands	iOS	Puzzle	Chimera Entertainment	GamesInFlames
2013	Happy Hills 2	iOS	Physical puzzle	Chimera Entertainment	Dreamfab / Thumbstar
2013	MS COPAKTIV	iOS, Android	App	Chimera Entertainment / Zeitland	TEVA GmbH
2014	John Woo's Bloodstroke	iOS, Android	Action	Chimera Entertainment / Wolpertinger Games	Moonshark / Chillingo
2014	Aloha Paradise Hotel	Browser	Business simulation	TG Nord	GamesInFlames
2014	netwars – The Butterfly Attack – Episode 1	iOS, Android	Interactive graphic novel	Chimera Entertainment	Filmtank / Bastei Luebbe
2014	Crash! UFO	iOS, Android	Endless runner	Chimera Entertainment	DeNA
2014	Angry Birds Epic	iOS, Windows Phone, Android	RPG	Chimera Entertainment	Rovio Entertainment
2014	GTS Driver	Browser	Racer	it Matters Games	Porsche
2014	ONE TEVA (internal)	iOS, Android	App	Chimera Entertainment / Zeitland	TEVA GmbH
2014	ratiopharm Gute Reise	iOS, Android	Health app	TG Nord	TEVA GmbH
2014	Bernd das Brot und die Unmöglichen	PC	Adventure	Chimera Entertainment	deepsilver / Bumm Game
2014	Aktiv mit MS	iOS, Android	Health app	Zeitland / Wolpertinger Games	TEVA GmbH
2014	Firewater	iOS, Android	Endless runner	Doublesmith	B!
2015	DogHotel	iOS, Android	Simulation	it Matters Games	Tivola
2015	Mystery of Neuschwanstein	Android, iOS, PC	Hidden object adventure	Chimera Entertainment	Astragon
2015	Son of Nor	PC, Mac, Linux	RPG	Stillalive Studios	Viva Media
2015	Impossible Super Ninja	iOS, Android	Action / arcade	Doublesmith	Thumbspire
2015	Lemming Dynasty	iOS, Android	Endless runner	Rockodile Games	Rockodile Games
2015	Stardust Galaxy Warriors: Stellar Climax	PC	Action shooter	Dreamloop Games	Dreamloop Games
2016	CatHotel	iOS, Android	Simulation	it Matters Games	Tivola
2016	Bus Simulator 2016	Mac, PC	Simulation	Stillalive Studios	Astragon
2017	Angry Birds Evolution	iOS, Android	RPG	Chimera Entertainment	Rovio
2017	Safe Way Forward	iOS, Android	Casual	Rockodile Games	Neste Oyj
2018	Bus Simulator 2018	PC, PS4, Xbox one	Simulation	Stillalive Studios	Astragon
2019	Rescue HQ – The Tycoon	PC	Simulation	Stillalive Studios	Aerosoft GmbH
2019	Horse Club	iOS, Android	Kids game	zeitland media & games	Schleich
2020	Drone Swarm	PC	Space sci-fi strategy	Stillalive Studios	Astragon Entertainment
2020	Pet Clinic: Cats & Dogs	PC, Nintendo Switch, PS4	Simulation	It Matters Games	Microids
2021	Grand Casino Tycoon	PC	Simulation	Stillalive Studios	Aerosoft GmbH
2021	Bayala Einhorn Abenteuer	iOS, Android	Kids game	Zeitland	Blue Ocean Entertainment
2021	Cobra Kai	Browser	Casual	Frag Games	Netflix
2021	Doctors & Nurses	PC, Nintendo Switch, PS4,	Kids game	It Matters Games	Microids
2021	Bus Simulator 2021	PC, PS4, Xbox One	Simulation	Stillalive Studios	Astragon Entertainment
2022	Bus Simulator City Ride	Nintendo Switch, iOS, Android	Simulation	Stillalive Studios, Wolpertinger Games	Astragon Entertainment
2022	Life in Willowdale	PC, Nintendo Switch	Adventure	Frag Games	Mindscape
2022	My Universe: My Baby Dragon	Steam, Mac OS, PS5, PS4, Nintendo Switch	Kids Game	It Matters Games	Microids
2023	Survivor Mercs	Steam	Action RPG	Wolperting Games	Wandering Wizards
2023	Death from above	PC	Political Wargame	Rockodile Games	Lesser Evil
2023	Inescapable	PlayStation 5, Nintendo Switch, Xbox One, PlayStation 4, Microsoft Windows, Xbox Series X and Series S	Social Thriller	Dreamloop Games	Aksys
2023	Songs of Silence	PC, Xbox Series, PlayStation 5	Strategy	Chimera Entertainment	TBC
2023	Death From Above	PC	Simulation	Rockodile Games	Lesser Evil
2023	Garden Life	PC	Simulation	Stillalive Studios	Stillalive Studios
