= Venetica =

2009 action role-playing video game

- German cover art
- Developer: Deck13 Interactive
- Publishers: DE: DTP Entertainment; EU: Mastertronic Group; NA: Rombax Games
- Director: Jan Klose
- Engine: PINA (heavy modified OGRE)
- Platforms: Microsoft Windows; Xbox 360; PlayStation 3
- Release: 4 September 2009: Windows; GER: 4 September 2009; FRA: 21 January 2010; UK: 12 November 2010; NA: 18 January 2011 Xbox 360; GER: 18 December 2009; EU: 12 November 2010; NA: 11 January 2011 PlayStation 3; GER: 3 December 2010; EU: 10 December 2010; NA: 10 January 2011
- Genre: Action role-playing
- Mode: Single-player

Venetica is a 2009 fantasy-themed action role-playing video game developed by Deck13 and published by DTP Entertainment. It was first released in Europe on 4 September 2009 for Microsoft Windows, with ports for the Xbox 360, and PlayStation 3 being released in 2009 and 2010 respectively. Venetica was later re-released for the North American market in January 2011 and distributed by Rombax Games.

The game takes place in a fictionalized version of 16th-century Europe in and around Venice in which Death is a human being chosen by a mysterious group called the Corpus to fulfill the duties of the grim reaper. When a necromancer abuses the powers to gain immortality and control the world, the last Death's daughter, Scarlett, is tasked with stopping him and rescuing her father. Players take control of Scarlett from a third-person perspective, guiding her to urban and rural areas. Scarlett uses Death's scythe to fight as well as other melee weapons and magical spells called twilight powers. Quests grant experience points that can be used to upgrade weapons and skills.

Venetica received mixed reviews from critics. The story and the ability to make choices that influence it were generally praised but graphics, audio, character design and technical problems were criticized.

== Gameplay ==
Scarlett fighting with several enemies. In the upper left corner a medallion displays health (red), mental energy (blue) and twilight energy (purple). In the upper right is the mini-map. The bottom right features a bar with all currently accessible magic spells.

Venetica is an action role-playing game. Players control its protagonist Scarlett in a third-person 3D world. The environment is partitioned in several maps with no true open world movement. Players on PC can use either keyboard and mouse or a gamepad to control Scarlett; on consoles only a gamepad can be used. The game uses a day and night cycle with each time of day lasting 15 minutes.

Players cannot customize the protagonist herself but the game offers an experience point based leveling system that awards skill points and attribute points with each level gained. Skill points allow Scarlett to learn new fighting or magical powers by interacting with certain non-player characters. Attribute points can be used to increase one of four basic attributes that correspond to in-game characteristics, namely "constitution" (health points), "wisdom" (mental energy), "strength" (amount of damage dealt with weapons) and "mental power" (amount of damage dealt with spells).

The protagonist can enter the spirit realm at certain places, allowing her to interact with characters who already died in the real world. Upon reaching Venice for the first time, Scarlett has to choose between joining one of three different guilds, with that choice changing both how the story will unfold and what skills will be available to choose from. The game features a reputation system that tracks her actions in Venice and reflects her renown in the city. Completing quests often grants Reputation while illegal acts such as breaking into houses or stealing will decrease it. A sufficiently high enough Reputation is required to interact with some characters.

Fights play out by using a single attack button, combined with evasive or blocking maneuvers. However, players can chain multiple attacks to perform powerful combo attacks by timing attacks correctly. Additionally, players can use magical spells called mental skills by using mental energy, the game's equivalent to magic points. Mental energy is also used to power combat techniques called physical skills. Venetica features another type of energy called twilight energy. It is collected by fighting enemies using Death's scythe, called "Moonblade" in the game. Twilight energy also allows Scarlett to access the spirit world, called the Twilight World, which is required to solve some puzzles.

Fights against the five main villains take place twice, once in the real world and afterwards again in the Twilight World where the villain has turned into a monster. With sufficient twilight energy, Scarlett will enter the Twilight World upon death allowing players to reposition her on the battlefield. If she does not have sufficient twilight energy, she will die and players are forced to reload their last manual save-game since Venetica features neither automatic saving nor respawn points. Even after replaying scenes, cutscenes and dialogue cannot be skipped.

The game's head-up display features a medallion in the upper left corner that displays the current health in red, the current mental energy in blue and up to six segments inside that if filled in purple denote sufficient twilight energy to resurrect Scarlett upon death. In the middle is an orb that contains the player's level and which slowly fills up as they gain experience. In the upper right corner, a mini-map is displayed and in the bottom right corner, a spell bar allows quick access to currently equipped spells.

In typical role-playing game fashion, Venetica offers players the choice of different weapons and armaments as well as potions and items to heal and help the protagonist. Players can find such items in the game world, by defeating enemies and as rewards for completing quests. The game features a main quest line based on the story as well as several optional quests that allow players to gain additional loot. Venetica offers between 25 and 40 hours of single-player gameplay.

== Synopsis ==
=== Setting and characters ===
The story of Venetica takes place in a 16th-century styled world in and around Venice where Death is a physical being, who follows the instructions of a group known as Corpus. Every generation, Corpus must select the successor for Death. The game takes place after the council chooses a necromancer to control Death and he decides to bring complete death and destruction upon the world. This necromancer has immortalized himself through Death; thus, the current Death and Corpus cannot stop him. The player takes control of Scarlett, Death's daughter, who must cultivate and grow her powers to save her father and the world from the necromancer.

=== Plot ===
Scarlett is living in the small fictional village of San Pasquale near Venice with her lover, Benedict. The game begins with the village being attacked by assassins and Benedict dying in order to protect Scarlett. On the night after the attack, Death appears in her dreams and reveals that she, who thought herself an orphan, is actually his daughter, conceived shortly before he became Death, granting Scarlett many of Death's powers. He tells her that Victor, the Undead Archon, used a loophole in the rules that bind existence to cheat death and become nearly immortal. Initially chosen to be Death's successor by the Corpus, he instead focused on the forbidden art of necromancy and was cast out. Denied what he considers his birth right to become Death, he swore vengeance on the world. For his plans, he recruited four allies to rule the mortal world as the Undead Five: The Mistress of the Assassin's Guild, Hector of Persia, Princess Chiamaka of Africa and the Doge of Venice. Death informs Scarlett that Victor is seeking the Black Grimoire, a powerful book of spells that would allow him to consolidate his power forever.

Tasked by Death to do so, Scarlett travels to Venice to track down the necromancer Sophistos, the last guardian of the Black Grimoire, to learn whether he destroyed the book as instructed. On her way into the city, Scarlett is accosted by the Mistress of Assassins who she defeats in a duel. She then tracks down Sophistos to Hector's flagship which anchors near Venice. Upon reaching him, Sophistos is killed but Scarlett defeats Hector and sinks his ship. She goes to Sophistos' house in Venice and uses her powers to converse with his spirit there. He tells her that he constructed a furnace hot enough to burn the book but instead opted to hide it, forcing Scarlett to retrieve it. After finding it and battling Sophistos' ghost who objects to the book's destruction, Scarlett manages to destroy the book. Scarlett then moves into the Inner City after deciding which of three guilds to join: The Order of the Holy Seal, a warrior order fueled by revenge that Benedict wanted to join before his death, The Hooded Wings, a guild of discreet messengers, or the Net of the Mask, the necromancer guild Victor was a member of. Depending on which guild is chosen, different tasks have to be fulfilled.

Princess Chiamaka places a curse on Scarlett which will eventually kill her if not removed by the Princess herself. Scarlett travels to Africa to confront Chiamaka and after defeating her, the curse is lifted and also gives her an essence needed to reach Victor who has sealed himself in the Doge's Palace. She enters the Palace to find that Victor has magically forced the Doge to reconstruct the Black Grimoire from the Twilight World where it ended up after its prior destruction. Scarlett fights both men and manages to kill the Doge but not before he finished transcribing the book. Scarlett and Victor fight for it and Victor merges with the spirit of the Doge in the Twilight World. After defeating the merged being, Scarlett fights and defeats Victor in his mortal form. After his defeat, Death will appear and offer Scarlett to kill Victor herself or to let Death take him. The game ends with one of two cutscenes, depending on whether Scarlett behaved nobly or villainous.

== Development ==
Venetica was developed by Deck13, a small German developer with less than 40 employees which had previously mainly developed point-and-click adventure games, such as Ankh and Jack Keane. The game was first announced by publisher DTP Entertainment on 27 May 2008 with the release of story information and four screenshots. More features, such as the day and night cycle, were shown to the press in October 2008. In March 2009, the developer collaborated with German games magazine PC Games to give players the chance to name a weapon in the game complete with back story. On 21 April 2009, the winner was revealed to be "Chantori".

On 26 August 2009, publisher DTP Entertainment announced that the Windows version of Venetica had gone gold. Venetica was first released for the European market on 4 September 2009 for Microsoft Windows. In December 2009, Deck13 released a patch that significantly improved the game's graphics and level of detail as well as its performance and added a number of new features.

The game was later ported to the Xbox 360, and PlayStation 3. The Xbox 360 version was developed by Wizarbox and released on 18 December 2009. The PlayStation 3 version was released on 3 December 2010. All versions of Venetica were released in North America in January 2011 where they were distributed by Rombax Games. Despite internal wishes, Deck13 has ruled out a sequel in December 2017.

== Reception ==
Reception

Aggregate score
Aggregator	Score		
Aggregator	PC	PS3	Xbox 360
Metacritic	61/100	47/100	42/100

Review scores
Publication	Score		
Publication	PC	PS3	Xbox 360
Destructoid	N/A	N/A	3/10
Eurogamer	6/10	N/A	N/A
Game Informer	N/A	N/A	5.5/10
GamePro	N/A	2/5	N/A
GameSpot	6/10	5/10	5/10
IGN	6/10	6/10	6/10
Joystiq	N/A	N/A	2/5
Official Xbox Magazine (UK)	N/A	N/A	5/10
PC Gamer (UK)	60%	N/A	N/A
PlayStation: The Official Magazine	N/A	4/10	N/A
RPGamer	N/A	N/A	2.5/5
RPGFan	62%	N/A	N/A
The Guardian	N/A	N/A	3/5
411Mania	N/A	N/A	5.2/10

The game got "mixed or average reviews" for Windows, and "generally unfavorable reviews" for the PlayStation 3 and Xbox 360 according to ranking aggregator Metacritic.

The graphical design of the game was generally found lacking and dated by reviewers. RPGamer called the setting "stunning" but limited their praise to the scenery, adding that up-close areas and characters look incorrect and that the game is marred with inconsistencies. GamesRadar+ called the experience of playing the game "dizzying", citing sharp light contrasts, erratic camera and too small subtitles, and opined that the graphics would have been considered terrible even on previous generation consoles like the PlayStation 2 or the GameCube. In his review for Bit-Tech, Chris Pickering agreed with these criticisms but pointed out that at times, such as the shimmering effect of certain weapons, the graphics are actually quite good. The graphics on the console versions were generally considered worse than for the PC version despite the game not using the full potential of the consoles.

There was near unanimous consensus among reviewers that the game suffered from many graphical bugs, with critics citing examples such as limbs appearing in door and walls, swords hovering in the air, items appearing through other items, and disappearing shadows. IGN opined that these, combined with stiff animations and poor lip-syncing, made the game unintentionally funny.

The soundtrack was rated passable but unimpressive and reviewers noted a distinct lack of music. Venetica received worse reviews for its English versions with many reviewers particularly criticizing the poor writing, voice acting and recording as well as non-matching subtitles that suffer from poor spelling.

The fight system received mixed reactions. Some critics lauded the combo system and the useful spells that allow the player to handle larger groups of enemies without the game becoming too easy for it as well as adding some needed variety. Others were less enthusiastic, calling the fight system shallow and repetitive "button-mashing"-only and especially criticized that because of the poor camera movement or getting stuck in the environment, players suffer unpreventable deaths. Writing for PC World, Matt Peckham opined that the game forces players to simply keep hitting buttons as enemies can withstand even strong attacks with ease, comparing fights to "chiseling stone that can chisel back" and speculating that the developers increased the enemies' strength in an attempt to draw out engagements. Reviewers also bemoaned the lack of an autosave feature, forcing players who did not manually save to replay large parts of the game with no way to skip ahead. The controls on Windows were criticized by some, with Bit-Tech opining that players using keyboard and mouse were at a disadvantage.

German magazine GameStar praised the quest design, emphasizing that quest givers are believable within the story and that the quests are varied, although it noted that feedback for solving quests diminishes in the later stages of the game. IGN liked the aspect of the Twilight World and how players are forced to switch worlds to solve some quests and defeat some enemies. Critics also liked the morality system and that players can choose different approaches and make choices on how to proceed, although the lack of long-term impact was noted. Others found the quests less interesting, opining that they boil down to simple kill or retrieve quests.

The writing and character design was criticized by some critics as mediocre. Writing for Destructoid, Hollie Bennett opined that the characters felt so two-dimensional and underdeveloped that she felt relief when some traveling companions died and no longer had to be interacted with. She went on to say that she liked the basic idea and emphasized that Venetica was an accomplishment for such a small development team but criticized that the developer's over-ambition led to so many problems that the game became frustrating to play. On the other hand, IGN emphasized that the story was interesting and liked the branching storylines and morality choices the game offers.
