= Mouse Trap (board game) =

1963 board game

- 2005 edition Mouse Trap playing board and box.
- Publishers: Hasbro
- Publication: 1963; 63 years ago
- Years active: 1963 to present
- Players: 2–4
- Setup time: 5–15 minutes
- Playing time: 30 minutes
- Chance: High (dice rolling game)
- Age range: 6+
- Skills: Finger dexterity

Mouse Trap, originally Mouse Trap Game, is a board game first published by Ideal in 1963 for two to four players. It is one of the first mass-produced three-dimensional board games. Players at first cooperate to build a working mouse trap in the style of a Rube Goldberg machine. Then, players turn against each other to trap opponents' mouse-shaped game pieces.

== Gameplay ==
An animation of the 1999 version of Mouse Trap

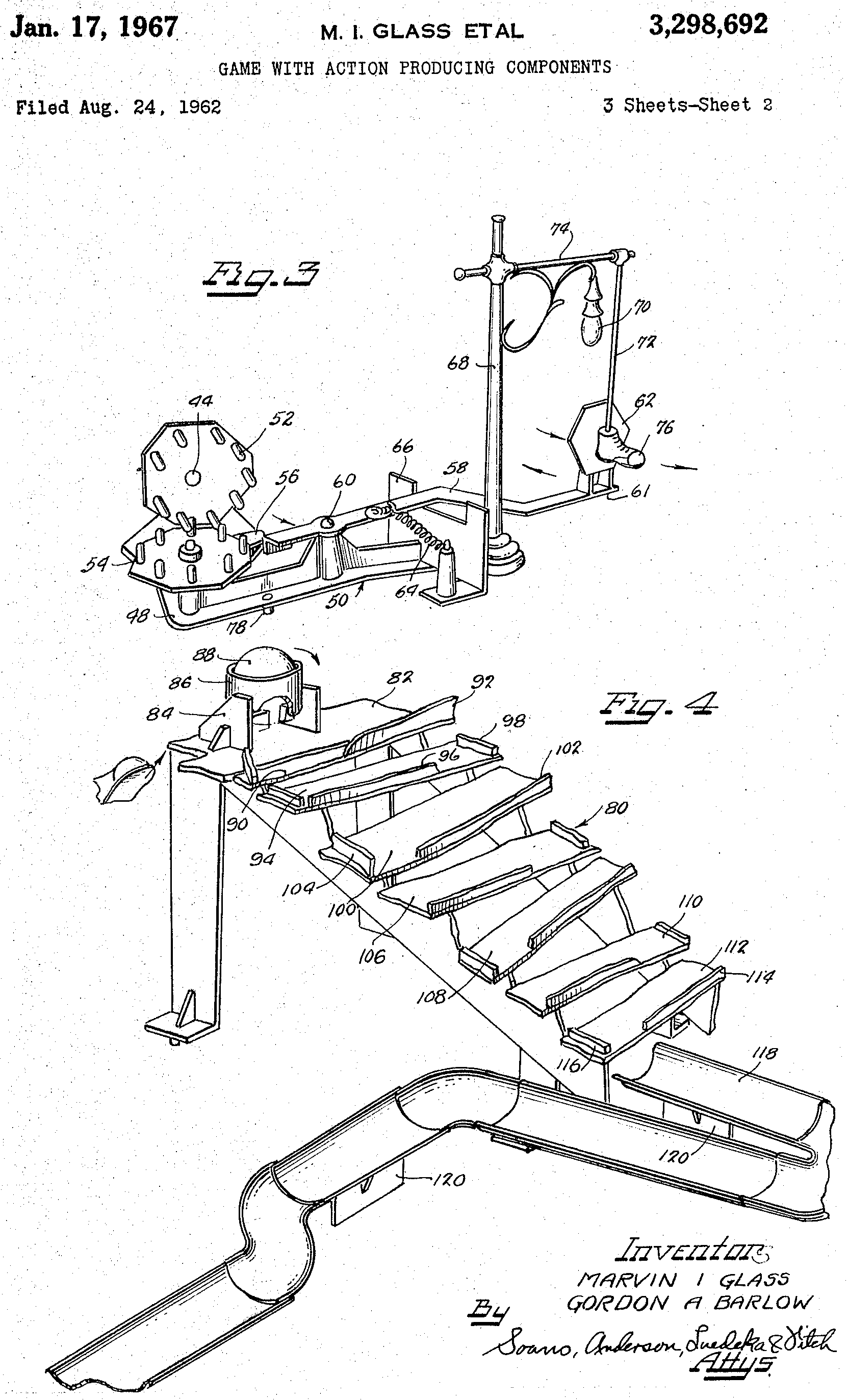
Patent drawings of the first part of the mouse trap.

=== Original version ===
The basic premise of Mouse Trap has been consistent over time, but the turn-based gameplay has changed. Its concept was first invented by Marvin Glass and designer Gordon Barlow from Marvin's company, Marvin Glass and Associates, who were later granted a US patent in 1967. The original published version of the game in 1963 was then designed by Hank Kramer of Ideal Toy Company, filling in the details Glass had left open, and allows the players almost no decision-making, in keeping with other games for very young children such as Candyland or Chutes and Ladders (Snakes and Ladders). Players take turns rolling a die to advance their mouse piece along a path around the game board, from the start space to a continuous loop at the end. The Rube Goldberg-like mouse trap is assembled in the center of the board, with players adding one or more of its pieces when they land on specified "build" spaces -- the number on the space has to match the number of players participating. The trap is always assembled in a specified order, and is attached to the board by inserting tabs into holes and locking them into place.

Along the ending loop are additional "build" spaces (in case the trap is still not completed), a "cheese" space positioned directly underneath the trap's cage, a "turn crank" space, and a "safe" space. If a player lands on the "turn crank" space when an opponent is on the cheese space, the crank can be turned on the machine to launch it; if the machine works properly and the cage falls on the cheese space, that opponent is eliminated from the game. The winner is then the last one remaining after all the other players are captured.

The mouse-trapping mechanism works as follows: One player turns a crank, turning two gears and pushing on a lever. The lever whacks a stop sign into a shoe, which kicks a small bucket holding a large ball bearing. The ball bearing rolls down some crooked stairs and into a rain gutter, and then follows the gutter to bump into the bottom of a vertical rod. The top of the rod has a "helping hand" that bumps another ball bearing, making it fall through a "thing-a-ma-jig" and into a bathtub, then out of the bathtub and onto a diving board. This catapults a diver on an arc up and into a washtub, knocking loose a cage suspended from the top of a bumpy rod. The cage rattles down the rod and onto another player's mouse, trapping it.

=== Revised versions ===
In 1975, the board game surrounding the trap was redesigned by Sid Sackson, adding the cheese pieces and allowing the player to maneuver opponents onto the trap space. Players collect cheese-shaped tokens during the game, and if the trap space is vacant when they land on the "turn crank" space, the tokens can be redeemed for a die roll to move an opponent.

A modified version was released in the United Kingdom in 2004, featuring three mousetraps (with a specialized trigger working at random) and a completely different board and plastic components. Among the changed trap components in this version is the inclusion of a model toilet (which serves as the random trigger) instead of a model bathtub.

A version of the game featuring characters from the Elefun and Friends universe was introduced in 2014. Among the changes in this version, the trap is built before the start of the game, a spin wheel is used instead of dice, and the cheese pieces and their relevant rules are not included. Also, there are three mice named Sneakers, Nacho and Pepper.

Also in the 2010s, Hasbro introduced Classic Mousetrap with several major changes from the previous versions. The object in this game is to collect six cheese pieces. Instead of being eliminated from the game when caught by the trap, a player only forfeits cheese pieces to the opponent. The trap machine was modified, such as with the elimination of crank gears in favor of launching the trap by directly pulling the lever with the plastic stop sign.

== Similar games ==
Crazy Clock Game
- Manufacturers: Ideal Toy Company
- Publishers: Ideal Toy Company
- Publication: 1964; 62 years ago
- Genres: Roll-and-move, cards
- Players: 2–4
- Setup time: 15 min
- Playing time: 30 min
- Synonyms: Crazy Clock

Fish Bait Game
- Manufacturers: Ideal Toy Company
- Publishers: Ideal Toy Company
- Publication: 1965; 61 years ago
- Genres: Roll-and-move
- Players: 2–4
- Playing time: 15 min
- Synonyms: Fish Bait

Game designer Marvin Glass (and his company, Marvin Glass and Associates) acknowledged that Mouse Trap had obviously been greatly influenced by Rube Goldberg's illustrations, though they refused to pay licensing or royalty fees. Glass later developed two lesser-known games based on Goldberg designs, Crazy Clock Game (Crazy Clock) (1964) and Fish Bait Game (Fish Bait) (1965), neither of which credit Goldberg's influence. Elderly and near retirement, Goldberg declined to take legal action against Glass, primarily because inspiration and ideas are not intellectual property that can be protected with a copyright, trademark, or patent. He instead chose to sell licensing rights for his drawings to another toy company, Model Products, to help secure the rights to specific intellectual property that he could own and receive royalties from.

In Crazy Clock Game, players race to build a Rube Goldberg machine. The game comes with a pack of cards, each illustrating how one piece of the machine fits in. The deck is dealt out to the players. The player starts with the first card, card 1; players then play as many cards (install as many machine components) as they can, then pass to the next player. After fully assembling, they take turns trying to operate the machine, starting with the player who installed the last component; the winner is the one who first succeeds.

Fish Bait Game is simpler than Mouse Trap. Players play as fishermen and build a contraption to catch a man-eating fish. Each time a player lands on an empty white space, the player must build a part of the contraption. Other spaces can either give the player an extra turn, take a turn, or go back a space. The game keeps going until the contraption is fully built and a player lands on the "FISH BAIT" space, when the player must take their piece on the plastic dock and hook the rubber band inside of the fish's mouth around the legs. Players keep moving until someone lands on the "CATCH FISH" space and starts the contraption to catch the other player's piece. Once caught, the player is out of the game (although if the trap fails, the one getting caught and the one catching the fish have to switch places until there is a successful catch) and the game continues; the winner is the last one standing.

== Legacy ==
In the 1990s, Mouse Trap was adapted into a game show within the British children's television show Motormouth. Child contestants take the place of the mice in a life-size board game.

Mouse Trap has been lampooned by Mark Perez of San Francisco in the form of a giant traveling spectacle called Life Size Mouse Trap. KRON4 described it at Maker Faire of 2014 as "a fantastically hand crafted, 16 piece, 50,000-lb. interactive kinetic sculpture set atop a 6,500-square-foot game board ... complete with a Vaudevillian style show, original musical score by the one woman band Esmerelda Strange, Sexy Mice can-can dancers, clown workers, acrobatic hijinks, and other spectacular scenes dedicated to the pursuit of spectacle-laden fun!" It is hauled to fairs and events by 25 tons of cranes and equipment in a semi truck, it has a bowling ball instead of a ball bearing, and it ends in the destruction of a real automobile. The Mercury News said in 2016 "instead of trapping a rodent — they drop a huge old bank safe on a car. Sweet. ... It's all very awesome, a masterpiece of engineering. But kind of a bummer you can't actually play on it — as the ball." Smithsonian Magazine reported the exhibit's merit in teaching physics and simple machines.

== See also ==
- Crazy Machines and Crazy Machines 2
