= The Mystery of the Druids =

2001 video game

- Developer: House of Tales
- Publisher: cdv Software Entertainment
- Director: John Delbridge
- Producer: Tobias Schachte
- Writers: Martin Ganteföhr; Tobias Schachte
- Composers: Christoph Ferger; Jens Schneider
- Platform: Microsoft Windows
- Release: DE: March 23, 2001; EU: September 14, 2001; NA: November 8, 2001
- Genre: Adventure
- Mode: Single player

The Mystery of the Druids (German: Das Geheimnis der Druiden) is a single-player adventure video game developed by the German company House of Tales and published by cdv Software Entertainment. The game was first released in March 2001 for Microsoft Windows.

The story takes place in Britain, where Detective Brent Halligan, an inspector at Scotland Yard, investigates a brutal series of murders. The investigation leads Detective Halligan into a mystery surrounding the demise of the British Order of Druids and eventually takes him on a trip through time itself.

Nordic Games announced on December 5, 2014, that it had acquired the game's intellectual property.

== Gameplay ==
Gameplay screenshot

Much of the gameplay in The Mystery of the Druids consists of discovering clues and solving puzzles. Clues are mainly found by moving the computer mouse over various objects on the screen and clicking them to add them to the inventory or gain information about them. Puzzles are often solved by combining items using drag and drop gestures, after which the player must figure out how to use the newly created item. Many actions in the game require completing such puzzles, such as using a telephone.

Interaction with non-player characters is accomplished through dialog trees. These conversations with non-player characters are essential to playing the game, as many of the major plot points are revealed through conversation rather than through investigating the environment.

== Plot ==
Detective Brent Halligan

The Mystery of the Druids begins with a dark ceremony at Stonehenge in 1000 AD, where a communion of druids have gathered around an altar, upon which five infants lay. As they chant, the druids become enveloped in a supernatural glow before being consumed by fire.

In 2000, a series of brutal murders have been taking place in London over the past few months, with the case coming to be known as the "Skeleton Murders". At New Scotland Yard, Detective Brent Halligan is summoned to Chief Inspector Miller office, shortly after he dismisses Halligan's co-worker, Detective Steve Lowry. After a man who was wrongly convicted of the murders was killed while in prison, and with the true killer still at large, Miller has taken Lowry off the case and begrudgingly placed Halligan in charge. In his investigation, Halligan enlists the help of Dr. Melanie Turner, an anthropologist at the Oxford Anthropological Museum, and historian Arthur Blake.

With their assistance, Halligan discovers that the murders match the description of cannibalistic sacrificial rites performed by Britannic druids; according to Blake's research on translated inscriptions, a demonic superior druid seized power over the druidic order in its last days to force mankind to submit to his rule by performing a "final ritual", which would transfer the druids' knowledge and power to five infants known as the "Inheritors". The ritual was not entirely completed, but the Inheritors are said to be powerful enough to complete it themselves one day, which they achieve by transferring the life-force of individuals through their cannibalistic rituals.

While investigating a lead regarding a group of neo-Druids called "The Circle", Halligan is captured and held prisoner by their leader, Lord Sinclair. Halligan escapes, but discovers The Circle performing a human sacrifice and faints. Halligan awakens at dinner and, unbeknownst to him, is eating human flesh, which grants strength and power, but also makes him susceptible to brainwashing.

Turner is led to Lord Sinclair's estate through information Halligan left at her museum and attempts to sneak into the property. If Turner is noticed while trying to break into the mansion, Lord Sinclair's security will capture her. She is brought inside, where a brainwashed Halligan, who does not seem to recognize her, informs her that she will be the guest of honor for their dinner. A few days later, Turner's skeleton is found in a forest near London. Halligan is listed as missing and last seen leaving his Scotland Yard department.

Once Turner successfully infiltrates the mansion, she finds the Amulet of Transformation, an artifact which may be required to complete the Final Ritual. Halligan discovers her, and a fight ensues where she knocks him unconscious. As Halligan awakens, he discovers that he was brainwashed, discerning that Sinclair plans to put a curse on the world to enslave humanity.

Upon escaping the estate, the pair reconvene at Blake's residence, where Blake points them towards the Twelve Bridges ruins. After Sinclair attacks the residence and kills Blake, Halligan and Turner arrive at Twelve Bridges, where they are sent back in time to 1000AD. Shortly after arriving, the pair are captured by soldiers and imprisoned at a nearby castle controlled by the demonic druid Serstan. After escaping the castle with the assistance of Serstan's brother, Maglor, Halligan stumbles on the ritual site and attempts to disrupt it by stealing a staff. However, Serstan, holding Turner hostage, interrupts him and demands the staff back. Halligan barters the staff for Turner's life and a promise, on Serstan's honor, that no harm will come to Halligan or Turner. Serstan agrees and begins the ritual, whereupon Halligan and Turner are transported back to their own time.

Halligan and Turner rush to Stonehenge where The Circle is attempting to complete the final ritual. Halligan stabs Turner with scissors and informs Serstan that the vow has been broken, causing Serstan to intervene and cause the Circle to disappear, preventing the ritual from being completed. Turner is near death, but Halligan saves her using magical mistletoe, after which they share a kiss.

== Development ==
cdv Software Entertainment revealed The Mystery of the Druids, then titled The Heirs of the Druids, to IGN on July 12, 2000. It was developer House of Tales' first release. The Mystery of the Druids was advertised as containing "50 detailed locations", "360 interactive scenes" and "20 speaking characters". It also blended "2D and 3D graphics, including character models with up to 1000 polygons."

A playable game demo was released on May 25, 2001, which featured game-play up to the Anthropology Museum in Oxford. A second game demo was released later that year on September 25, which included the time travel scene to prevent the ancient ritual which resulted in the creation of the Inheritors.

The first trailer was released on August 14, 2001, featuring game-play videos of Detective Halligan. A second trailer was released on August 30 which showcased the various locations of the game, as well as the druidic ritual which is seen at the beginning of the game. The third and final trailer was released on September 6, 2001. This trailer introduced the romance between Detective Halligan and Dr. Melanie Turner as it progresses throughout the game.

== Reception ==
=== Domestic ===
Reception (German publications)

Review scores
Publication	Score
4Players	77%
PC Games (DE)	78/100
PC Action	74%
PC Player	69/100

In the German market, The Mystery of the Druids debuted at #29 on Media Control's computer game sales chart for March 2001. Alex Watson of GameSpot UK wrote that the game had become a "big hit" in Germany by July. The German publication Golem.de similarly reported that the game was "quite successful".

Writing for Golem.de, Thorsten Wiesner commented, "The exciting story and the atmospheric game design are big pluses, but deficiencies in control and some weak graphics are also clear negatives—with a little more care, The Mystery of the Druids could have been a much better title."

=== International ===
Reception (International sources)

Aggregate scores
Aggregator	Score
GameRankings	53%
Metacritic	49/100

Review scores
Publication	Score
Computer Games Magazine	1/5
Computer Gaming World	1.5/5
Computer and Video Games	4/10
EP Daily	7/10
GameSpot	4.6/10
GameSpy	50%
PC PowerPlay	51/100
PC Zone	74/100

The Mystery of the Druids received mixed reviews. Brett Todd of Computer Games Magazine proclaimed it "poorly designed, ugly, and rife with bugs." Computer and Video Games derided its "unimaginative settings and painful dialogue" as well as its inclusion of "some of the most ridiculously complex puzzle sequences to achieve even the simplest of tasks" before deciding that it has "very little appeal for anyone but the most patient and geeky PC-head." GameSpot described its characters as "rude", its puzzles and dialogue branches as "confusing", and the game overall as "surprisingly devoid of plot." GameSpy described it as being a game that might make customers "take matters into their own hands and put the [adventure game] genre out of its misery". In a positive review, PC Zone's Mark Hill wrote that the title's "closest gaming relatives are Broken Sword and the Blade Runner game, [but] Druids is far superior to both." He summarized it as "best serious adventure game in years".

== Legacy ==
In retrospect, Martin Ganteföhr characterized The Mystery of the Druids as an important learning experience for House of Tales, despite its mistakes and many negative reviews. He said after its release:

The Mystery of the Druids was a game that was flawed in many areas, and much of the criticism it received was justified. I must admit, however, that I was a little surprised by the obsessive nature of some of the negative reactions. We knew we could do better, but MOTD was a debut game, no more or no less. ... When we had recovered from the terrible hangover all the negativity had given us, we sat down with the mission to create a better game.

House of Tales followed The Mystery of the Druids with The Moment of Silence in 2004, and later with Overclocked: A History of Violence (2008). In 2018, Ganteföhr worked with Daedalic Entertainment to create the game State of Mind.

== See also ==
- Necronomicon: The Dawning of Darkness
- Runaway: A Road Adventure
- Sherlock Holmes: The Mystery of the Mummy
- The Black Mirror
