= Atlas Fallen =

- Developer(s): Deck13 Interactive
- Publisher(s): Focus Entertainment
- Director(s): Jan Klose
- Designer(s): Jérémy Hartvick
- Engine: Fledge
- Platform(s): PlayStation 5; Windows; Xbox Series X/S
- Release: 10 August 2023
- Genre(s): Action role-playing
- Mode(s): Single-player, multiplayer

Atlas Fallen is an action role-playing video game developed by Deck13 Interactive and published by Focus Entertainment. The game was released for PlayStation 5, Windows, and Xbox Series X/S on 10 August 2023. It received mixed reviews from critics.

== Gameplay ==
Atlas Fallen is a third-person action role-playing video game. At the beginning of the game, players can create and customize their own player avatar. The player character is equipped with an ancient gauntlet that allows them to manipulate sand, to turn it into weapons. Players can use three different weapons, though they can only carry two at any given time. Atlas Fallen is an action-oriented game; players are required to dodge, counter and block incoming attacks, as well as quickly switching between land and air combat. As players attack enemies, they will gain momentum. At certain momentum threshold, the weapon the player is wielding will transform, and they can unleash a special skill or ability that deals devastating damage to their opponents.

The game features an open world, with regions for players to explore, and players can meet different non-playable characters and complete various side quests and activities. Movement is an essential part of the game's exploration and transversal. With the gauntlet, players can glide through the game's desert landscape. The gauntlet allows players to perform feats such as air dashing. Players can raise buried objects, allowing them to discover hidden areas and open up new paths. As players progresses in the game, they will find "Shards" and "Catalyst Pieces", which further upgrade the gauntlet's combat capabilities. The game includes a two-player cooperative multiplayer mode.

== Development ==
Atlas Fallen is being developed by Deck13 Interactive using their in-house engine Fledge. According to design director Jérémy Hartvick, the game is not a "Soulslike" like the studio's previous games, Lords of the Fallen and The Surge. Instead, its combat system emphasizes speed and fluidity, and that the game's overall design was inspired by games such as God of War (2018) and the Horizon series. Nonetheless, staples from The Surge games such as a body targeting system were incorporated into Atlas Fallen. The game offers three difficulty modes, with the hard mode designed for veteran players of Soulslike games.

Atlas Fallen was announced by Deck13 and publisher Focus Entertainment at Gamescom in August 2022. While initially set to be released in May, the game was delayed to August 10, 2023, for Windows, PlayStation 5 and Xbox Series X and Series S to allow additional development time for the team to further polish the game and include a full German voice-over at launch. Players who preorder the game will gain access to "Ruin Rising Pack", which introduces various cosmetic items and essence stones into the game.

A free content update, titled "Reign of Sand", which introduces new areas and quests, updated voice-overs and dialogue, and a revamped opening act, was released in August 2024.

== Reception ==
Atlas Fallen received "mixed or average" reviews from critics, according to review aggregator website Metacritic. In Japan, four critics from Famitsu gave the game a total score of 29 out of 40.
