= DreamLand: Final Solution =

- Developer: Top Galaxy
- Publisher: Top Galaxy
- Release: 1999
- Genre: Adventure

DreamLand: Final Solution was a 1999 Czech adventure game developed and published by Top Galaxy. The game was released on three CDs and with a development price of approximately 10 million crowns, it was until then the most expensive and largest Czech video game.

== Development and release ==
DreamLand: Final Solution was until 2003 (when Black Mirror came out) the most technologically advanced Czech adventure game. It also had the largest production run of any Czech adventure game up to that time. However, due to the high price, it didn't sell well. Out of the 10,000 copies produced, only a fraction were sold at the full price of 1,300 crowns. According to Hernimag, DreamLand: Final Solution is one of the least known Czech game, although it is not a bad game. For the creative team at Top Galaxy, who had invested over ten million crowns in the game's development, the game was a financial disaster.

DreamLand is a third-person point and click adventure similar to the first two Broken Sword games. The virtual reality sequences are 3D rendered rather than painted. The cartoon graphics were created by airbrush artist Karel Kopic, who also worked on the adventure Polda 6 from 2014. In Dreamland, a 3D rendered background was used for the first time in the Czech environment. It contained 65 two-dimensional and 45 three-dimensional screens and about 250 dubbed characters. For the first time, synchronization of dubbing with the mouth and parallax scrolling in three phases were also used.

== Plot and gameplay ==
The game is set after 2020, where the most popular form of entertainment is virtual reality, which can only be experienced at the orbital station DreamLand opened in 2016. It is expensive, and considered dangerous due to rumours of customers returning to Earth with damaged minds. Players take the role of journalist Jimi Dix, who is sent by his boss to uncover the secrets of the station. He will also visit seven different virtual worlds. Also in the story are intelligent monkeys, who work here as cheap labor, they are artificially created cyborgs.

== Critical reception ==
Petr Ticháček of Bonusweb.cz felt the game had a perfect atmosphere and incredible breadth despite several significant shortcomings. Doupe.cz judged that the game's flaws would prevent it competing directly with the comparable top foreign products. Gamesport felt the title was wildly inconsistent in quality, while according to Sector.sk, "everything indicates that Dreamland is one of the best, if not the best, Czech adventure games ever".

== See also ==
- Video games in the Czech Republic
