= The Moment of Silence =

2004 video game

- North American cover art
- Developer: House of Tales
- Publishers: Digital Jesters; The Adventure Company
- Programmer: Tobias Schachte
- Artists: Andreas Moll; Sven Moll
- Writer: Martin Ganteföhr
- Composers: Tilman Sillescu; Pierre Gerwig Langer
- Platform: Microsoft Windows
- Release: GER: October 1, 2004; EU: November 5, 2004; NA: February 25, 2005
- Genre: Adventure game
- Mode: Single-player

The Moment of Silence is an investigative thriller adventure game developed in 2004 by German developer House of Tales.

== Story ==
The game is set in the year 2044 in downtown New York City, in a future with many Orwellian influences. The player plays an advertising agency worker named Peter Wright, who is depressed and drinking heavily after the death of his wife and child in a terrorist attack. One night, as he is drinking, he hears a commotion in the hall. Looking out through the peephole in his apartment door, he sees a SWAT team storm the apartment of his next door neighbor and carry out a middle-aged man, much to the pain and anguish of his wife. Peter learns that the man was a freelance journalist named Graham Oswald, and is asked by his wife to discover what had happened to him.

Attempting to investigate, Peter is deflected at every turn by the police who begin to investigate him, a branch of Luddites, and even online acquaintances. Eventually Peter is informed he's won a "Vacation" to an orbiting station which is a cover for a rehabilitation clinic, and he meets a number of intellectual and political figures who've been removed from society, as well as a factory of automated drones. Peter sabotages the drone factory and escapes the station, and is sent to prison on Governor's Island, the only inmate but learns Oswald was recently there. Peter removes a tracking implant he is surgically installed with and escapes by swimming to shore.

Escaping underground, Peter discovers a dying Oswald, who is on his last legs after a harrowing escape from a prison on Governors Island. Before dying, Oswald tells Peter that he must go to Alaska and complete the mission that Oswald failed. After Peter arrives in Alaska, he discovers that the government is being run by a dystopian artificial intelligence, whose only concern is keeping the world tidy and in order, and has slowly begun to erase evidence of its existence. The computer also reveals that it has been watching Peter for a long time, and that it engages in massive social manipulation, having been several of the online friends he has. It further threatens Peter that if it is deactivated, it will launch a set of nuclear weapons, including one at Peter's home. Peter successfully shuts down the computer system, and manages to abort the launches. In the epilogue, Peter's computer pops up with a message from an online contact, asking if Peter wants to be friends.

== Release ==
The game was published by several different publishers around the world. In Germany the game was published by dtp in November 2004 and featured an extensive German voice cast, which included the German voice actors for Bruce Willis and Julia Roberts. In the United Kingdom, Digital Jesters published the game until their demise in early 2006. It is unclear if the game is still in print in Britain. In North America, The Adventure Company won the rights to publish the game, which it did starting in 2005.

A major controversy in the European versions of the game involved the use of StarForce copy protection software, which covertly installed itself on the computers of users who installed the game. The software sometimes caused a user's system to crash, or become unresponsive, even if there was no copying software on that computer. The North American version of the game does not use Starforce.

The game was re-released DRM-free in 2015 with Windows 10 support on the GOG.com website.

== Reception ==
=== Domestic ===
Reception

Review scores
Publication	Score
PC Games	81/100
GameStar	80/100
4Players	79/100
PC Action	80%

Chris Kellner of German publisher DTP Entertainment reported that The Moment of Silence was a commercial success in his country. Alongside titles such as The Black Mirror and Sherlock Holmes: The Case of the Silver Earring, it contributed to DTP's large-scale growth during 2004.

=== International ===
According to review aggregation website Metacritic, The Moment of Silence received "mixed or average reviews" from critics.

== See also ==
- Ankh
- Syberia II
- The Black Mirror
- The Westerner
