= Crazy Machines Elements =

2011 video game

- Developer(s): Fakt Software
- Publisher(s): DTP Entertainment
- Series: Crazy Machines
- Platform(s): Microsoft Windows, PlayStation 3 (PlayStation Network), Xbox 360 (Xbox Live Arcade)
- Release: Windows: GER: March 25, 2011; NA: December 6, 2011; EU: 2012; PSN: PAL: August 24, 2011; NA: January 10, 2012; XBLA; August 25, 2011
- Genre(s): Puzzle
- Mode(s): Single-player

Crazy Machines Elements is a puzzle video game developed by Fakt Software and published by DTP Entertainment for Microsoft Windows, PlayStation Network, and Xbox Live Arcade in 2011.

== Gameplay ==
In Crazy Machines Elements the objective is to solve a seemingly simple problem (cook a hot dog, pop a balloon) by constructing a Heath Robinson / Rube Goldberg-esque machine. The 3D game relies heavily on in-game physics and utilises NVidia PhysX. For any given puzzle, the player is provided with a collection of items e.g. ramps, springs, steam engines, electrical devices, gears, belts, and a large selection of other mechanical devices for converting and directing raw energy into useful motion. On the completion of each puzzle, the player is rewarded with points and a gold, silver, or bronze lug nut. Not only does the created machine have to perform the assigned primary task, but might also complete one or more of the optional secondary tasks thus earning more points.

== Reception ==
Reception

Aggregate score
Aggregator	Score
Metacritic	(PC) 63/100 (PS3) 62/100 (X360) 55/100

Review scores
Publication	Score
Destructoid	(X360) 7/10
Eurogamer	(X360) 4/10
GamePro	(X360)
GameRevolution	(X360) C
IGN	(PS3) 5.5/10
PlayStation Official Magazine – UK	(PS3) 7/10
Official Xbox Magazine (US)	(X360) 5/10
PALGN	(X360) 7.5/10
PC Gamer (UK)	(PC) 52%
Play	(PS3) 71%

The game received "mixed" reviews on all platforms according to the review aggregation website Metacritic.
