= 15 Days (video game) =

2009 video game

- Developer: House of Tales
- Publisher: DTP Entertainment
- Platform: Windows
- Release: GER: 20 November 2009; NA: 18 June 2010; UK: 15 July 2010
- Genre: Adventure
- Mode: Single-player

15 Days is a casual adventure game developed by German independent developer House of Tales and published by DTP Entertainment. It was released for Windows in November 2009.

== Gameplay ==
The player controls three art thieves who steal artwork and give the money they make to charity.

== Plot ==
The story begins with the three political activist thieves; Cathryn, Mike and Bernard stealing the luxurious art of Cecil Rhodes in Cape Town. Success brought them to steal the another prized painting of Winston Churchill at London Modern Museum, however, as days pass by, they were embroiled into bigger political conspiracy with the death of Foreign Secretary Henston, with Interpol Special Agent Jack Stern on the case, which led them to the game of cat and mouse from London to Paris in search for the truth.

== Development ==
The game engine developed by House of Tales allowed the developers to use tracking shots and pans which are usually impossible with pre-rendered backgrounds.

== Reception ==
According to review aggregator Metacritic, 15 Days has a score of 63 based on six reviews.

In a one-and-a-half-star review ("poor"), Adventure Gamers criticized the game for its gameplay, bugs and lack of content, stating there were only two standalone puzzles and that most of the game is just walking between rooms looking for something to do. When you meet an NPC person to talk to, you just click a single dialog icon and they tell a player something, without any other interaction on the player's part, no choices for what to say at all.

GameStar felt the game's puzzles were too simple for adventure gaming aficionados. Gameswelt praised the appealing and authentic nature of the game's aesthetics.
