= Blood Knights =

2013 action role-playing video game

- Developer: Deck13 Interactive
- Publisher: Kalypso Media
- Director: Jan Klose
- Designer: Sven Hammer
- Composer: Dynamedion
- Platforms: Xbox 360; Windows; PlayStation 3
- Release: Xbox 360; 1 November 2013; Microsoft Windows; 13 November 2013; PlayStation 3; 19 November 2013
- Genre: Action role-playing
- Modes: Single-player, multiplayer

Blood Knights is an action role-playing game for Microsoft Windows, PlayStation 3 (through PlayStation Network), and Xbox 360 (through Xbox Live Arcade). The game was developed by German studio Deck13 Interactive and published by Kalypso Media, also from Germany. Blood Knights was released in November 2013 for the Xbox 360, Microsoft Windows, the PlayStation 3.

The game features two playable characters: Jeremy, a vampire hunter, and Alysa, a vampire that Jeremy became ritually bound to, on a quest to retrieve an artifact that can cause cataclysms. The game features both single-player and local cooperative gameplay (co-op) modes but does not allow for online co-op. Blood Knights received generally negative reviews upon release, with a large number of critics faulting the game for showing a lack of creativity and having uninteresting gameplay.

== Gameplay ==
Jeremy and Alysa engage in combat in co-op mode.

The game follows a traditional top-down and sometimes dynamic camera, as the two playable characters jump and fight enemies and get loot through the scenarios in classic dungeon crawler fashion. Players move about several areas, including a forest and a castle, using precision jumping and puzzle-solving to move about the level. Players can discover equipable weapons and armor that improves effectiveness in combat by exploring levels for chests. Combat takes the form of set-piece battles, in which a number of enemies appear and must be defeated before the player can continue to progress through the area. These enemies include human outlaws, demons, werewolves, and other vampires. The game also contains boss battles, in which the player must defeat a significantly stronger enemy that is aided by normal enemies.

Players assume control of Jeremy, a sword-wielding, melee-focused character, and Alysa, who uses crossbows to deliver ranged attacks. The game can be played as a single-player game, in which the player alternates between controlling Jeremy and Alysa, or as a local co-op game, in which two players play cooperatively, with one controlling each character. Blood Knights does not support online co-op. Like most hack and slash games, the control scheme is minimal. When controlling Jeremy, players can chain attacks using one button (the X button on the Xbox 360), and can use a number of special attacks that have a cooldown timer, including a heavy blow, a whirlwind attack, and a power that draws distant enemies to Jeremy. While controlling Alysa, the game functions as a twin-stick shooter, in which movement is controlled by one thumbstick or set of keys, and firing weapons is controlled by the other thumbstick or another set of keys. Alysa also has special attacks, including the ability to fire flaming arrows and a grenade attack. In single-player gameplay, the player can switch between Jeremy and Alysa by pressing a button (the Y button on the Xbox 360). Players can transfer health, in the form of blood, between the two playable characters, healing one at the expense of the other.

== Plot ==
Blood Knights takes place in a fictional version of Earth in which humans and vampires are at war. The main character, Jeremy, is the captain of a holy order that fights vampires. At the beginning of the game, the order travels to a set of ruins to protect the Blood Seal, a powerful artifact, from being captured by the vampires. The order suffers heavy losses in the attempt, and in desperation, the priest Bartholomew uses a ritual to bind Jeremy to the vampire Alysa. During the course of Jeremy's attempt to retrieve the seal, he is turned into a vampire, and the vampires seize the seal themselves. With the seal removed from its resting place, the moon begins to crack apart, causing unpredictable and violent tides. Because Jeremy has been turned into a vampire himself, Bartholomew and another member of the holy order, Castello, kick Jeremy and Alysa into an abyss inside the ruins, abandoning them for dead. Castello assumes Jeremy's place as the captain of the order.

Jeremy and Alysa escape the ruins and pursue the vampires that stole the Blood Seal. Castello and the holy order are also pursuing the vampires. Jeremy and Alysa reach Godskeep, a human stronghold. In order to pass through the town, the pair must first rescue the town's sheriff, who went into a nearby forest with the town guard in an attempt to kill the powerful vampire Blood Fox. Jeremy and Alysa defeat Blood Fox, and in the town, Jeremy encounters Bartholomew, who split from Castello after an argument. Bartholomew tasks Jermey with recovering the Relic of Light, a powerful weapon that can be used against the vampires, in order to prove that Jeremy is still loyal to the order.

After retrieving the weapon, Jeremy is informed that the Lords of Pikehold, a group of knights that defends the area, have defeated the vampire army carrying the blood seal. On his way to Pikehold Castle, Jeremy is then ambushed by Castello. The pair fight Castello, who falls off a cliff after being defeated. Inside Pikehold Castle, Jeremy discovers that the Lords of Pikehold have become thralls to a succubus. Jeremy and Alysa defeat the Lords of Pikehold and the succubus, who informs Jeremy that the Blood Seal has been taken by a vampire mage to the top of a mountain.

Bartholomew meets Jeremy and Alysa at the top of the mountain and informs the pair that the vampires have already summoned a powerful demon that will slaughter mankind. Bartholomew has called upon the army of Rome, led by the powerful First Paladin of Rome, to defeat the demon. Jeremy, knowing that the First Paladin of Rome would kill him and Alysa on sight, sets off to defeat the demon before the army of Rome arrives. When Jeremy and Alysa confront the demon, it explains that it was summoned because the humans have become too numerous, and with increased numbers, they have gone from fearing vampires to hunting them. Jeremy and Alysa kill the demon and Bartholomew recovers the Blood Seal. As he does this, the First Paladin of Rome arrives and demands the seal for himself. Bartholomew gives the seal to Jeremy instead and battles the Paladin to delay the army of Rome.

Jeremy travels back to the ruins from the beginning of the game, only to find that the army of Rome has beaten him there. Jeremy and Alysa meet the First Paladin in the Blood Seal's resting chamber. The Paladin explains that he wishes to destroy the seal, causing a great deluge that will bring the people, who had stopped believing the Church's teachings, back under the Church's influence. Jeremy refuses to allow the Paladin to do this, and the Paladin attacks. After being injured, the Paladin pulls back and Castello appears and attacks. Jeremy and Alysa kill Castello and the Paladin re-enters the fight. Jeremy and Alysa appear to severely wound the First Paladin, but he boasts that vampires cannot kill him, as he is under the protection of Rome. Bartholomew emerges from behind the Blood Seal's resting place and slits the First Paladin's throat from behind, killing him. Bartholomew claims that although the Blood Seal was destroyed in battle, the moon will heal itself. He reveals that while he has heard that it can be done, he does not personally know how to turn Jeremy back into a human, and unless he is human, the bond between him and Alysa cannot be undone. The game ends with Jeremy and Alysa agreeing to work together to find a way to reverse Jeremy's transformation into a vampire.

== Development ==
Blood Knights went through a number of delays before being published. Announced by German publisher dtp entertainment in July 2012, the game was originally scheduled for release in the summer of 2012. Game Informer cited release date as 31 October 2012 (Halloween), but was later shifted back to December, citing "legal negotiations", and then to 20 February 2013, citing a need for more development time. 20 February passed with neither the release of the game nor an announcement by the developer or publisher, although both Xbox.com and Amazon.de listed release dates in mid-march. Developer Deck13 Interactive then announced a release date of 19 March. That month, Deck 13 founder Jan Klose explained that the release date remained uncertain, and expected the game to be released no later than mid-May 2013. Klose called the game 99.9% complete, and blamed the delays on financial difficulties at dtp entertainment, which necessitated that Deck 13 become a co-publisher and take on responsibilities that the studio not planned for. The game was eventually released by a different publisher, Kalypso Media, as the first game under their digital-only label "Kobolt Games". The game was finally released in November 2013 for the Xbox 360, PC, and the PlayStation 3.

== Reception ==
Reception

Aggregate scores
Aggregator	Score
GameRankings	(X360) 48.00% (PC) 37.50%
Metacritic	(X360) 43/100

Review scores
Publication	Score
Official Xbox Magazine (UK)	6/10
Official Xbox Magazine (US)	5/10
X-ONE Magazine	3/10

Blood Knights received mixed to poor reviews upon release. According to video game review aggregator Metacritic, the Xbox 360 version of the game received an average score of 43 out of 100, based on 8 reviews.^{[B]} The UK Official Xbox Magazine remarked that "Blood Knights holds as much annoyance as satisfaction", while the US version of Official Xbox Magazine contended that "Blood Knights is too easy to ever become actively irritating, but its deficit of danger makes it too darn dull to hold even a devoted horror nut's attention for long".

Critics took issue with the game's lack of originality. Henry Kelly of The Digital Fix comments that "the character models are quite basic and unimaginative - Jeremy has typically harsh features and the female characters are given skimpy outfits to show off their stereotyped fantasy physiques". X-ONE Magazine calls the game an "unashamed clone of Diablo", which borrows mechanics, naming conventions, and character archetypes from Diablo. The gameplay was considered by critics to be too easy, with a terrible enemy AI that made combat unchallenging, interspersed with what Henry Kelly called "painfully simple non-puzzles". Other components that faced criticism included the shallowness of the RPG elements, the lack of online co-op, and the dialogue, which was considered poorly written and occasionally poorly acted.

Reviewers did, however, have positive things to say about the game's co-op system, lack of online support notwithstanding. Cameron Lewis of Official Xbox Magazine US, in the summary of his review, noted that "complementary characters make local co-op effective". The UK version of the magazine called the co-op "pleasant", while X-ONE Magazine felt that the mode gave the game more substance.

== Notes ==
^A GameRankings tracks ratings for each platform separately, and does not have a page for the PlayStation 3 version.
^B Metacritic tracks ratings for each platform separately, and does not assign aggregate scores for a platform until it receives at least four reviews specific to that platform. As Metacritic only lists three reviews for the PC version and one review for the PlayStation version, it has not issued aggregate scores for those platforms.
