= Black Sails =

Black Sails may refer to:

- Black Sails, a subsidiary 745 m summit of Wetherlam, a 763 m summit in the Coniston Fells of the Lake District
- Black Sails (TV series), a 2014 American drama series
- Black Sails EP, a 1999 EP by AFI
- Black Sails: The Ghost Ship, a video game

== See also ==
- Black Sails in the Sunset, a 1999 album by AFI
- Black Sails at Midnight, a 2009 album by Alestorm
