= House of Tales =

German video game developer

- Company type: Defunct
- Industry: Video games
- Founded: 1998
- Defunct: 2010
- Headquarters: Bremen, Germany
- Key people: Tobias Schachte; Martin Ganteföhr
- Website: www.house-of-tales.com (archived)

House of Tales Entertainment GmbH, trading as House of Tales, was a German video game developer based in Bremen. The company was known for its point-and-click adventure games.

== History ==
House of Tales was founded in 1998 by Tobias Schachte and Martin Ganteföhr, who had previously developed children's video games for the ZDF. The company's first game, The Mystery of the Druids, was published by CDV Software in 2001. The company initially lacked a corporate office and organized in a decentralized fashion online, a rarity at the time. In 2008, House of Tales was bought by DTP Entertainment, but initially remained an independent development studio under the new parent company. At the end of 2009, tensions arose between the House of Tales management and that of DTP regarding the future direction of the studio and the poor sales of 15 Days. As a result, Schachte left the company in January 2010. Ganteföhr departed in March. Thereafter, House of Tales' company headquarters was moved by DTP from Bremen to Hannover, the location of Cranberry Production, another DTP-owned development house. House of Tales was subsequently integrated into the Cranberry team, marking the end of the company.

In December 2014, the Swedish publisher THQ Nordic acquired the rights to House of Tales' adventure games and made them available via digital distribution platforms.

== Games ==
Title	Publisher	Genre	Date	Platform	Notes
The Mystery of the Druids	CDV Software	Adventure	2001	Windows	
Black Hole	elkware	Adventure	2003	J2ME	
The Paper Menace	elkware	Adventure	2003	J2ME	
The Moment of Silence	DTP Entertainment	Adventure	2004	Windows	
Secret of the Lost Link	elkware	Adventure	2004	J2ME	
The X-Files: The Deserter	elkware	Adventure	2004	J2ME	Part of The X-Files franchise
Verliebt in Berlin	DTP Entertainment	Adventure	2005	Windows	Part of the Verliebt in Berlin franchise; co-developed with Radon Labs
Overclocked: A History of Violence	Anaconda (DTP)	Adventure	2007	Windows	
15 Days	DTP Entertainment	Adventure	2009	Windows	
The Mystery of the Ghost Ship	DTP Entertainment	Hidden object game	2010	Windows	

For all of its games, House of Tales used a proprietary development environment called Inca ("Interactive Narrator's Companion for Authoring"), which includes a graphical user interface for building the infrastructure of a game and an adventure-specific scripting language.

== Awards ==
The Moment of Silence was voted Adventure of the Year in 2004 by PC Games and the website Adventure-Treff. Overclocked received the Innovation Award at the 2007 Deutscher Computerspielpreis.

== See also ==
- Daedalic Entertainment – German adventure game developer
- King Art Games – German adventure game developer
- Frogwares – adventure game developer from the same period
- Pendulo Studios – adventure game developer popular in Germany during the same time
