= The Surge 2 =

- Developer: Deck13 Interactive
- Publisher: Focus Home Interactive
- Designer: Adam Hetenyi
- Composers: Markus Schmidt; BowsToHymns; Stumfol; Talla 2XLC
- Platforms: Microsoft Windows; PlayStation 4 Xbox One
- Release: Windows, PS4, Xbox One; 24 September 2019; Amazon Luna; 20 October 2020
- Genre: Action role-playing
- Modes: Single-player, multiplayer

The Surge 2 is a 2019 action role-playing video game developed by Deck13 Interactive and published by Focus Home Interactive, that is the sequel to The Surge. The game was released for PlayStation 4, Windows, and Xbox One on 24 September 2019, while an Amazon Luna version released on 20 October 2020. It received positive reviews from critics.

== Gameplay ==
The Surge 2 is an action role-playing game played from a third-person perspective. The game features a character creator which allows players to customize the appearances and gender of their player avatar. Players can utilize a variety of melee weapons to defeat enemies, whose limbs can be targeted and removed individually. Players can also dodge and parry attacks, which requires players to properly angulate their equipped weapon. Combat drones and consumables such as bio-sensors can also be deployed. When players kill or dismember their opponents, they can collect and equip the weapons, armor enhancements or tech left by them. Jericho city, the game's setting, offers alternate paths which players can explore freely. In the game, players will meet different non-playable characters and have to make different choices which will affect the game's world and story. Players can also leave graffiti messages in their game's world for other players to see.

== Synopsis ==
=== Setting ===
The Surge 2 is set in a dystopian future where humans have exhausted the world's resources, leading to strained social and environmental conditions bringing mankind to the brink of extinction. CREO, one of the largest tech conglomerates, makes attempts at restoring the environment but with the task taking too long, a second process is developed, Project UTOPIA, a means to use nanites to complete the project faster but costing the lives of 95% of humanity. The nanites behind the project gain sentience, becoming a Rogue Process, and faced with the CREO board voting against their use, trigger a system-wide crash, killing or corrupting every machine and human connected to the CREO network. Project UTOPIA is then launched by an automated system, carrying the Rogue Process nanites.

The central plot of The Surge 2 takes place in Jericho City, an advanced metropolis surrounded by a giant wall aimed at stemming the advance of the nanites. It follows an unnamed male or female character, dubbed the "Warrior", who is searching for Athena Guttenberg, the granddaughter of CREO founder Jonah Guttenberg. The Warrior's journey brings them into conflict with the A.I.D. disaster relief unit who are evacuating the city, and the Children of the Spark, a religious cult that worships the Spark, an unstable but powerful source of energy. Led by Matriarch Celeste, the cult believes that the coming of the nanites is foretold by their prophecy of humans ascending beyond mortality by merging with machines. The Children are split into two factions under Celeste's two sons; Eli, prophet and heir to the Spark, and Johnny, his drug-addicted, slovenly brother who uses a physical-enhancing drug to manipulate his underlings. The Warrior is aided by Warren, the protagonist of the first game, who is now a masked man seeking the truth behind the actions of A.I.D.

=== Plot ===
Aboard an airplane, the player character befriends a young girl, Athena Guttenberg. The UTOPIA rocket collides with the plane, releasing its nanite payload which severely damages the craft, causing it to crash on the outskirts of Jericho City. Seemingly the only survivor, the comatose player character is recovered to a prison medical facility. Two months later, the player character is awoken by visions of Athena calling to them as her "Warrior". The prison is attacked by the Delver, a gigantic nanite-creature, freeing the prisoners and allowing the Warrior to escape after installing on themselves a powerful exoskeleton to enhance their abilities. Emerging out into Jericho City, the Warrior learns that the city is now infested with nanites, which are slowly claiming the city and infecting the citizens.

The Warrior meets a disguised Warren, and they also learn about the Children of the Spark, who believe the crisis foretells the coming of the Spark Incarnate. Brother Eli tasks the Warrior with defeating his brother Little Johnny, so that they can reach the crash site to search for Athena. The Warrior defeats Johnny, but is then betrayed by Eli who intends to claim glory by killing the person who killed his brother. Eli is killed by the warrior. At the crash site, the warrior has one of many visions revealing Athena's journey since the plane crash.

The Warrior pursues Athena's trail to the artificial nature reserve, Gideon Point, where the Delver is hiding. After killing the Delver, the Warrior learns that Athena had taken control of it to release the Warrior from the prison. The Warrior meets with CREO founder Jonah Guttenberg at the CREO Institute of Technology (CIT), and learns that Athena has been captured by A.I.D. Working with Warren, the Warrior infiltrates A.I.D. command and discovers that they have been abducting children under the guise of evacuation and using them in failed nanite-based experiments to try and communicate with the nanite swarm. All of the children have died during the experiments, except Athena because her exposure on the plane changed her, making her more suitable for the experiment. The Warrior defeats General Ezra-Shields who is guarding her, but the process begins before he can interfere. Athena is seemingly destroyed and absorbed into the swarm, reborn as a gigantic nanite serpent. An explosion of nanite activity is triggered, devastating Jericho City.

The Warrior returns to CIT and finds Eli has been resurrected and trying to gain access to Jonah's nanite research. After the Warrior kills Eli for a second time, Jonah reveals that he can remove Athena from the swarm, but that they will require a significant power source, the Spark. Infiltrating the Cathedral of the Spark, the Warrior defeats Eli's mother, Matriarch Celeste, after witnessing her revive Eli again using their own nanite technology. Eli's nanite-infused body grants him superhuman abilities. He leaves with the Spark, believing himself to be the Spark Incarnate that is destined to control the swarm and reshape the world in his own image. Eli kills Jonah and steals his research on connecting with the swarm which, combined with the Spark, allows him to steal Athena's powers. The Warrior pursues Eli to the Wall, a massive barrier built around the city, and confronts him.

Eli now possesses near God-like abilities, reshaping himself as Archangel Eli. The Warrior defeats Eli a final time, freeing Athena and her powers, and is given the choice of either executing or sparing Eli. Depending on decisions made throughout the game, Athena takes on her human form composed of nanites and either commends the Warrior for their humanity and compassion, or makes them serve as her guardian because of their lust for power. It is implied that the Warrior died in the plane crash, and Athena used her abilities to revive them as a hybrid of man and nanite. In the aftermath, Athena muses that machines will always be imperfect because they are made by imperfect beings, but that giving them a soul can make a difference.

== Development ==
Deck13 Interactive led the game's development. One of the team's goals was to ensure the game would offer players' freedom and choices. Therefore, unlike the first game, The Surge 2 allows players to create their own customizable characters. It also supports a larger variety of combat styles with the introduction of five weapon types. The team also reworked the game's artificial intelligence, with AI-controlled enemies being able to coordinate with each other during combat. Unlike the first game, which takes place in a factory, The Surge 2 takes place in a larger, more vertical city. By changing the setting, Deck13 was able to implement more diverse environments and introduce more alternate paths and characters for players to meet.

Publisher Focus Home Interactive announced the game in February 2018. The game was released for Microsoft Windows, PlayStation 4 and Xbox One on 24 September 2019, and for Amazon Luna on 20 October 2020.

== Reception ==
Reception

Aggregate score
Aggregator	Score
Metacritic	PC: 76/100; PS4: 75/100; XONE: 78/100

Review scores
Publication	Score
Destructoid	7.5/10
GameRevolution	1.5/5
GameSpot	8/10
GamesRadar+	3.5/5
IGN	7.6/10
PC Gamer (US)	79/100

The Surge 2 received "generally favorable" reviews, according to review aggregator Metacritic.
