= Hendrik Lesser =

German game developer

Hendrik Lesser is a German businessman and developer. He is the CEO and founder of Remote Control Productions. In 2016, he was appointed President of the European Game Developers Foundation.

== Early life and career ==
Lesser was born in Munich, Germany. He was closely involved in the Evangelical Church in Munich, working as a youth leader in the organization. He then attended LMU Munich and studied political sciences, as well as studying philosophy under the tuition of the Munich School of Philosophy. Lesser started his games industry career as an intern at Take-Two Interactive in Germany, working across various roles. During this time he directly oversaw the relationship with Ascaron which produced various hits including the PC RPG Sacred.

After working for Take-Two Interactive he formed his own consultancy (Hendrik Lesser Productions) providing freelance insight into business development, marketing, production and creative content. During this time he was also a Jury member at Deutscher Entwicklerpreis and worked as the Head of Department for Games Academy in Berlin.

In 2005, he founded his own company Remote Control Productions as ML Enterprises GmbH with Marc Möhring. In 2008, the company was renamed to Remote Control Productions (RCP). Over the next 15 years, RCP grew to a group of around 20 studios.

In 2023, RCP founded Lesser Evil, a new publishing label headed by Lesser and featuring his likeness as the logo. The label is dedicated to making games which "take a stand" and "video games with clear political or social intent and messaging", Lesser Evil has identified itself as "uncompromisingly anti-authoritarian, anti-racist, and pro-democracy." Lesser Evil's first game, Death From Above is set in Ukraine during the Russian invasion of 2022.

Lesser has also served as the president of the European Game Developers Federation since 2016 and a board member since 2013. He is also a founding member and managing director of Games Bavaria Munich.

=== Chimera Entertainment ===
The first member of the RCP developer family, Chimera Entertainment, was founded by Lesser, Christian Kluckner and Alexander Kehr in 2006. Since then, the studio has released 25 projects (Including Angry Birds Epic and Angry Birds Evolution) and currently employs over 80 people. The studio won the LARA Startup Award in 2007.

EGDF & other trade and cultural organizations

Lesser has been the president of the European Game Developers Federation since 2016 and a board member since 2013. He helped doubled the associations' membership base from 10 to more than 20 associations by encouraging Eastern and South-Eastern European games industry associations to join the EGDF.

Lesser is also a founding member and managing director of Games Bavaria Munich. Games Bavaria Munich e.V. (GBM) was founded to represent the common interests of local companies in the games industry. The association acts as a voice for developers in politics, business and society. At the same time, it offers a forum for joint exchange and cooperation.
