= Overclocked: A History of Violence =

2007 adventure video game

- Developer: House of Tales
- Publisher: Lighthouse Interactive
- Writer: Martin Ganteföhr
- Platform: Microsoft Windows
- Release: GER: October 12, 2007; FRA: March 13, 2008; NA: April 15, 2008; EU: May 2, 2008
- Genre: Adventure
- Mode: Single player

Overclocked: A History of Violence is a psychological thriller adventure game developed by House of Tales and published by Lighthouse Interactive. The game was supposed to be released in North America on March 31, 2008, but was delayed to April 15, 2008.

== Story ==
The game, thematically about the effect and aftermath of violent acts, is about US Army psychiatrist David McNamara who is treating several mentally-scarred teen patients, during a violent thunderstorm in New York City.

== Plot ==
The game begins when five amnesic college-aged teens suddenly appear with guns in the middle of New York City. Psychiatrist David McNamara from DC is sent to examine the case thanks to his previous work in the US Army dealing with post-traumatic stress disorder. Right from the beginning, the case seems odd. On the first day, David discovers that all five patients had the same origins, and they were escaping from the same unknown person from an isolated military island. As the history is revealed, David, using a PDA as a tape recorder, makes his way through the teens' minds, piecing together their history, while at the same time dealing with his ongoing divorce. David himself has serious issues regarding anger management, which ended his former relationship.

It is revealed in the end that the teens were part of a military experiment for making amnesic assassins, and David's anger issues were only side effects of the previous project back in the Army.

== Production ==
House of Tales is a German game development studio founded by Martin Ganteföhr and Tobias Schachte. Ganteföhr served as both the writer and the creative director for the game. In a 2008 interview, he expresses his reasons for choosing such an intense topic (violence / psychology of aggression) as the theme for the game: "I chose the topic because it interests me, and is at least as worth to dedicate a game to as War on Mars. You see, making games is a very personal process for me. I have many questions about life, and as long as somebody is willing to listen, I will try to convey my thoughts and feelings in my games."

== Reception ==
Reception

Aggregate score
Aggregator	Score
Metacritic	70 out of 100

Review scores
Publication	Score
4Players	80%
Adventure Gamers	4 out of 5
Gamekult	5 out of 10
GameSpot	7.5 out of 10
GameZone	6 out of 10
IGN	7 out of 10
Jeuxvideo.com	15 out of 20
PC Gamer (US)	48%
PC Games (DE)	76%
PC Zone	56%

Overclocked received above-average reviews according to the review aggregation website Metacritic. Brett Todd of GameSpot favorably regarded the game's "deep, engaging story with lifelike characters and dialogue" but noted its nihilistic tone. IGN also noted the game's "haunting main theme... and gloom of rainy New York [which] adds an appropriate layer of anxiety to the experience." PC Gamer said, "Unless you're jonesing for an adventure game fix, your time's better spent rearranging your Netflix queue."

== See also ==
- Ankh: Battle of the Gods
- Sherlock Holmes: The Awakened
