= Ankh: Battle of the Gods =

- Box art
- Developer: Deck13
- Publisher: BHV Software
- Series: Ankh
- Engine: Ogre 3D
- Platforms: Windows; Mac
- Release: June 2008 (Win); March 2009 (Mac)
- Genre: Adventure
- Mode: Single-player

Ankh: Battle of the Gods (German: Ankh: Kampf der Götter, also known as Ankh 3 and Ankh 3: Battle of the Gods) is an adventure game, released in 2007 for the Windows and Macintosh computers, developed by Deck13 and published by BHV Software. As with Ankh and Ankh: Heart of Osiris, Ankh: Battle of the Gods utilises a modified version of the Ogre 3D graphics engine.

== Gameplay ==
Screenshot showing the game's visuals and interface

Typical to point-and-click adventure games, the characters are controlled with the mouse. Puzzles feature heavily, and are solved by identifying a keyspot within the visible area or by collecting vital items and then activating them in a given location. During the conversations between the characters, the player can select one of several dialogue options, some of which are essential to the puzzles later in the game.

== Plot ==
Players again assume the role of Assil, the protagonist of the two earlier Ankh games, and must prevent Seth, the god of chaos and the desert, from subjugating Ancient Egypt. The additional characters of Thara, Assil's girlfriend, and the Pharaoh are available to control at certain points during the game.

== Development ==
Like its two predecessors, Battle of the Gods was developed by Deck13.

== Reception ==
Reception

Review scores
Publication	Score
4Players	83%
PC Games	80%
Gameswelt	83%

Reception

Review scores
Publication	Score
Adventure Gamers	3.5/5
Game Boomers	B

Ankh: Battle of the Gods received mixed reviews. Commentators praised the stylised cartoon graphics, humour and charm retained from the earlier games in the series. Adventure Gamers remarked that the variety of in-game locations allowed the artists to creatively apply their talents. The music was credited as being excellent, providing a welcome "atmospheric" backdrop. In addition, the simplicity of the user interface and inventory system were noted as positive aspects. However, criticisms of the game focused on poorly developed side characters, lacklustre dialogue and the difficulty of certain puzzles.
