= Black Sails: The Ghost Ship =

2010 video game

- Developer: Deck 13 Interactive
- Publisher: Astragon Software
- Platform: Microsoft Windows
- Release: EU: Apr 22, 2010
- Genre: Adventure

Black Sails: The Ghost Ship is an adventure game developed by Deck 13 Interactive and originally published by Astragon Software on April 22, 2010 for Windows.

== Plot and gameplay ==
In the year 1884, the player is an investigator trying to solve a mystery. When her ship capsizes, she and another survivor are rescued by a strange abandoned ship.

The game uses the game engine as that used for Ankh and Jack Keane.

== Development ==
The game was released internationally onto Steam in September 2015. Jan Klose, creative director for Deck 13 revealed that due to the newfound popularity of adventure games, they felt it was the right time to bring Black Sails: The Ghost Ship to a North American audience.

== Critical reception ==
Reception

Review score
Publication	Score
Adventure Gamers	3.5/5

4Players deemed it a "truly interactive thriller". Adventure Treff praised the title for not artificially extending its run-time with unnecessary sidequests. ComputerBild praised the game''s three alternate endings that allowed the player to have agency. AdventureGamers felt the voice acting was just passable. Gamestar praised the subtle use of soundscape to create a sense of tension and drama. Die Hard Game Fan thought he game was let down by its poor plot, presentation, and mechanics. Spieltipps felt that lovers of Deck 13's Ankh would be disappointed by this title. Pressa2Join thought the game had a good story, well told. CommonSenseMedia noted the game may not be suitable to children due to a moment of implied rape or sexual assault toward a young girl. Tiscali felt that the game's classic-ness meant it also added nothing new to the genre.
