= Black Mirror (2017 video game) =

Gothic adventure horror video game

- Cover art
- Developer: KING Art Games
- Publisher: THQ Nordic
- Director: Jan Theysen (creative)
- Programmers: Arne von Öhsen (lead); Thomas Burger; Philipp Kolhoff; Lukas Höppner; Benjamin Kuhr
- Composers: Benny Oschmann; Andrew Osano ("additional")
- Series: The Black Mirror
- Engine: Unity 3D
- Platforms: Linux; Microsoft Windows; OS X PlayStation 4 Xbox One
- Release: NA: November 28, 2017; PAL: November 28, 2017
- Genre: Adventure
- Mode: Single-player

Black Mirror is a 2017 gothic adventure horror video game developed by KING Art Games and published by THQ Nordic. It is a reboot of The Black Mirror series, a trilogy of point-and-click games for Microsoft Windows, so is sometimes called Black Mirror IV or Black Mirror 4.

== Setting ==
The game features a new setting and cast of characters from the original title. Set in 1926, players control David Gordon, who travels from his home in the British Raj to his ancestral homeland of Scotland, following the suicide of his estranged father, John Gordon. John was an avid enthusiast of occultism, and the final weeks leading to his death remain a mystery. Given these suspicious circumstances, David begins an investigation into the suicide of John.

== Plot ==
A man runs in an abandoned village, hearing the screams of spirits. He approaches a ritual ground, where he says a prayer and lights himself on fire.

David Gordon receives a letter that his father, John Gordon, has died, and that he must return to his home to begin the process of inheriting John's estate, which his family has lived around since Roman times. The Gordon family butler, Angus McKinnon, escorts him to the castle grounds, called the Sgathan Dubh (Gaelic for "Black Mirror"). Margaret Gordon, David's grandmother, and Andrew Harrison, a lawyer working on dividing the property, greet him personally in the foyer, but are unwilling to answer David's questions about his father's death. Later that night, David sneaks out of his room to investigate the mansion, curious about the circumstances of the grounds and seeking further answers about John's passing. While exploring the mansion library, he overhears and notices that Andrew is looking for a room in the house.

While searching, David meets the grounds gardener, Rory Johnstone, maid, Ailsa Crannan, and his cousin Eddie Malorie, who similarly avoid his questioning. Later, an unknown boy appears next to him, who runs away after being spotted. When the child appears again, he is with Edward Gordon, David's deceased grandfather, who pushes the boy down the nearby stairs. David jumps to save the boy but falls down the stairs. Angus, Margaret, Ailsa, and Andrew arrive hearing the fall, but claim that they have not seen anyone. David wins Ailsa's trust by giving her an earring she lost, and she offers to give him help in his quest later that evening. Intermediately, David experiences another vision, showing the boy burying something at a grave in the yard. David goes to the grave and learns it is Cecilia Gordon, his dead aunt. In the chapel nearby, David experiences another vision and goes unconscious, to be saved by Leah Farber, his father's doctor, who is in the area.

Leah explains John was locked in a madhouse for his delusions regarding a curse. The pair return to the house where David questions Leah further. During this, Eddie finds Ailsa dead in the basement. Investigating the murder, David experiences more visions, including ones with a young woman, and questions Rory. Having softened up to David, Rory explains the woman David is seeing is Cecilia, who drowned herself in the lake on the property. Suspecting Eddie of murdering Ailsa through his investigation, David confronts Eddie, who asserts that he did not kill Ailsa, but does not deny the evidence presented by David. Eddie mentions Rosemary, the mother of Margaret and Edward and the great-grandmother of David, whereupon Margaret immediately breaks off the conversation and orders Angus to bring Eddie to the attic. David follows Eddie there and speaks to a completely distraught Eddie about Rosemary. A delusional Eddie points to a place on the wall that originally had a crucifix cross, triggering another vision in David, which shows Edward beating his mother Rosemary in the attic with a crucifix. David and Leah search the room and uncover a secret passage to the attic, where they find Rosemary, still alive and chained to a bed. Rosemary says Edward chained her there and refuses to leave, saying she is safer here than anywhere else on the property.

The two decide to confront Margaret about Rosemary's captivity, but as they head out, they encounter Margaret and Angus, who tell them that they just found out that Eddie has taken Andrew hostage after being accused of murdering Ailsa. While trying to free Andrew, the young boy reappears and causes a swarm of moths to attack Eddie, ending the standoff. Andrew, furious at the events of the night, leaves the castle. Searching the room, the pair find Edward's desk, which contains a diary about an abandoned village that has great power, in which Edward was born. Leah and David interrogate Rosemary for the location, an island across the lake on the property, and Rory sails them there. The two explore the island, filled with ghostly screams, and uncover a hideout. Inside, they find records written by Andrew, who intends to resurrect Edward's ghost and release it using the power of the Black Mirror, which the Gordon family grounds are built upon. It is also learned that Andrew is the son of Cecilia, making him David's first cousin. In another vision, David sees an apparition of his father, showing he is alive in the secret hiding place trying to prevent Andrew from performing the ritual in the abandoned village. After a fight, John escapes, and in another vision, performs a protective ritual, the event seen at the start of the game. Angus appears and attacks David with a knife. David frees himself, and Angus attacks Rory, who has come to help. Rory is stabbed, whereupon David attacks and distracts Angus. Rory pulls the knife out of his stomach and stabs Angus in the neck, killing him.

The three leave the village and, at Rory's request, go to the greenhouse on the property, where Rory performs a ritual to further strengthen David's connection with his father, who is revealed to be the ghostly boy David has been seeing. Rory succumbs to his injury in the greenhouse and Leah and David go back to the castle, where they find Margaret, who was beaten by Andrew, who has taken Eddie through a secret passage underneath the castle. David and Leah leave, after which Rosemary appears and attacks Margaret for enforcing her captivity; the two die in the fight. David has another vision, which he now knows is him seeing into the past, showing John accusing Edward of killing Cecilia. At this moment John penetrates the darkness of the Black Mirror, so that he pushes Edward to the ground and murders him with a model band. John's ghost appears again David forgives him and thanks his father. David and Leah now make their way through the passage to the Black Mirror in a cave. Leah disappears on the way. After this, John appears again as a ghost and leads David to the Black Mirror cave waiting for him. He finds Andrew, who is holding unconscious Eddie and Leah in front of the Black Mirror. Andrew is attempting a resurrection ritual intended to bring Edward back into this world, and needs the blood of three Gordons and a soul. Andrew kills Eddie and uses Leah as a bargaining chip to convince David to cut his hands for the blood offering. David deceives Andrew and snatches the knife from him, whereupon Leah pushes him into the Black Mirror. As Andrew sinks inside, the ghost of Cecilia appears, whom Andrew never met, and takes Andrew into the depths of the Mirror. The cave collapses, and David and Leah escape. Outside, the pair set Rory's body on the boat they had previously used and set it out to the lake, where John happily watches.

== Gameplay ==
Unlike the original trilogy, which was point-and-click in nature, Black Mirror is a more modern graphic adventure title. Players are free to explore the mansion at will, interacting with various objects in the environment to collect items and solve puzzles. Various characters can be found within the mansion including members of the Gordon family and staff, who may have information that can aid the investigation. As the story progresses, more areas of the Gordon's property become available.

== Release ==
Black Mirror was announced in August 2017 with a trailer and November 28 release date. It was released for Linux, Microsoft Windows, OS X, PlayStation 4 and Xbox One. Physical copies of the console versions exist, while the Linux, Windows and OS X releases are digital exclusives.

== Reception ==
Reception

Aggregate score
| Aggregator | Score |
|---|---|
| Metacritic | (PC) 60/100 (PS4) 54/100 (XONE) 57/100 |

Review scores
| Publication | Score |
|---|---|
| Adventure Gamers | 2.5/5 |
| Game Informer | 6/10 |
| Push Square | 6/10 |

Black Mirror received mixed reviews from critics, according to review aggregator Metacritic. The title was generally praised for its story, puzzles and art direction, but received criticism for its short length compared to other games in the series and technical issues, including glitches, bugs, poor graphics, and long load times.

The small extent of translation has been criticized, especially in the Czech Republic, where the game originates from, because all previous games have been translated into more languages.
