= CrossCode =

2018 video game

- Developer: Radical Fish Games
- Publisher: Deck13
- Director: Felix Klein
- Programmers: Felix Klein; Stefan Lange
- Artists: Thomas Fröse; Felix Klein; Fabrice Magdanz; Dillon Martin
- Writers: Felix Klein; Stefan Lange; Henning Hartmann
- Composers: Deniz Akbulut; Steel Plus (A New Home)
- Platforms: Linux; macOS; Windows; Nintendo Switch; PlayStation 4; Xbox One; Xbox Series X/S; PlayStation 5
- Release: Linux, macOS, Windows; September 20, 2018; Switch, PS4, Xbox One; July 9, 2020; Xbox Series X/S; November 10, 2020; Amazon Luna; November 12, 2020; PlayStation 5; June 29, 2021
- Genre: Action role-playing
- Mode: Single-player

CrossCode is a 2018 action role-playing game developed by Radical Fish Games and published by Deck13. Players control Lea, a player in a fictional MMORPG called CrossWorlds who wakes up with no memory and is unable to speak. Gameplay involves the player employing both ranged and melee shots to solve puzzles and defeat enemies, with differing elemental modes granting different powers used in combat and exploring.

The game's development began in 2011, and was later introduced as a crowdfunded project on Indiegogo. Following a three-year long early access beta phase, it was released for Linux, macOS, and Windows in September 2018, for PlayStation 4, Xbox One, and Nintendo Switch in July 2020, for Xbox Series X/S in November 2020, for Amazon Luna in November 2020, and for PlayStation 5 in June 2021. An expansion, A New Home, was released in February 2021. CrossCode received generally favorable reviews from critics, who praised its story, combat, and artstyle, but had mixed opinions on its puzzles.

== Gameplay ==
In-game, players solve puzzles using different elemental tools, such as this shock charge.

CrossCode is an action role-playing video game in which the player controls the character Lea from a two-dimensional top-down perspective. Players explore an overworld, where they can either engage in combat, or solve puzzles, which is sometimes required to progress. During combat and while solving puzzles, the player can instantaneously switch between different "elements", each granting Lea different puzzle-solving and attack abilities. As the game progresses, the player unlocks more elements by visiting different dungeons, each of which culminates in a boss fight. The game's options menu allows the player to customise the difficulty of both combat and puzzles.

The combat system involves attacking enemies in real-time using either a melee strike or a ranged ball launch that deals damage. Players can also dodge or block enemy counter-attacks. Attacking earns experience points and circuit points. Experience points increase the player's statistics, and circuit points can be spent on a "circuit board" that allows the player to choose between different ability bonuses. When fighting, the player has a "rank" which increases until they cease battle, rewarding them for unbroken continuums of combat. Higher ranks let the player gain rare items and heal faster.

Puzzles involve the same ball launching mechanic used in combat, sometimes requiring the player to hit items in a certain order or time limit. They comprise in-game items, such as switches, boxes, ice pellets, barriers, water bubbles, and fans. Depending on the current element the player has equipped, puzzle elements can react in multiple ways.

Players can also use both in-game money and a bartering system to buy items, which can also be found in hidden chests scattered across the overworld. Items can either be food that is used to grant temporary buffs to the player's ability, or clothing that is equipped in their inventory. The player can also complete multiple side quests, such as obtaining items, hunting for treasures and racing opponents, that grant additional bonuses.

== Synopsis ==
In CrossCode, players primarily control a silent protagonist named Lea as she plays a fictional massively multiplayer online role-playing game (MMORPG) known as CrossWorlds. It takes place in a physical environment on the moon Shadoon, where players control artificial "Avatars" that can regenerate at will and interact with in-game attacks and items.

=== Plot ===
The game begins with a young woman called Shizuka Sakai fighting her way to rescue her brother, but once she finds him, he dies in her arms from heart related injuries. Some time later, a girl called Lea awakens inside a cargo ship with no memories of her past and is informed by a man called Sergey Asimov that she must play CrossWorlds in order to regain her memories. Shortly after, Lea is attacked by a mysterious man known as the Blue Avatar, and is forced to escape into the gameplay area. Once reaching the game area, she befriends another player called Emilie and the two explore the game together, eventually joining the "First Scholars" guild.

During a raid with the First Scholars, Lea is dragged away by the Blue Avatar and trapped into an off-limits area called the Vermillion Wasteland. She is confronted by Shizuka, who reveals that Lea is not human but an artificial intelligence called an "Evotar," based on the memories of Shizuka. After escaping back to the cargo ship, she also learns that Sergey used to work on the creation of CrossWorlds in the Instatainment Company along his friends Gautham Ranganathan, Shizuka and her brother Satoshi. These friends also took part in the Evotar Project, which was denied by Instatainment, until disappearing years before the events of the game. Once Sergey discovered Lea, he decided to help her recover her memories in an attempt to look for them.

Back in the game area, Lea reunites with her friends and locates Satoshi and Shizuka's hideout. She learns that they, along with Gautham, were forced by a man called Benedict Sidwell, a black market financer who funded the Evotar Project, to participate in a scheme to create Evotars based on CrossWorlds' players and extract valuable information for him. Satoshi had secretly hidden Lea in CrossWorlds' code for Sergey to find, allowing him to locate his former colleagues. She also learns that the real Satoshi is already dead but left behind an Evotar based on himself. With help from her friends, Lea storms Vermillion Wasteland where the server containing all Evotars is located in order to stop Sidwell's operation. The Blue Avatar, revealed to be Gautham's player avatar, intervenes on both ends to deliver Lea the "ultimate experience": one final challenge in the form of a dungeon and a final boss duel. After she defeats him, he gives her access to the server, before committing suicide in atonement for cooperating with Sidwell. With his plans foiled, Sidwell accepts defeat and flees.

Having secured the Evotars' data, Lea spends some time with her friends before she is also logged out from the game while Sergey attempts to convince the executives of Instatainment to allow the Evotars to keep existing inside CrossWorlds. The game then ends with two possible outcomes:

- In the normal ending, Lea's friends are informed by Sergey that Instatainment refused his proposal and confiscated all Evotar data, thus they will never see Lea again.
- In the true ending, achieved after Lea befriends an Instatainment stockholder in the game right before the Vermillion Wasteland raid, Sergey's proposal is accepted by Instatainment and will allow Lea and other Evotars to eventually return to the game.

=== A New Home ===
Seven months after Lea and the other Evotars are allowed to live in CrossWorlds, Lea reunites with her friends and moves to a new house in Homestedt, a residential area created exclusively for the Evotars, just in time for the release of the latest update that includes the game's final dungeon. Before Lea challenges the dungeon, she is informed by Sergey that one of her friends, C'tron was actually an Evotar based on Sidwell sent to spy on her. She confronts C'tron, who reveals that he lost most of his recent memories and declares his intention to atone by cooperating with their efforts to bring Sidwell to justice.

After clearing the final dungeon, Lea returns to Vermillion Wasteland one last time to help C'tron recover his memories and discover that he was one of many Evotars created by Sidwell and sent to gather information for him, just to be later deleted once they discovered the truth about their origin. To escape this fate, C'tron made a copy of himself to the main Evotar server. After returning to Homestedt, C'tron reveals all he knows to the others and Lea is given the right to pass judgement on him, deciding if he can live in Homestedt with the other Evotars or not. Some time later, all other Evotars move to Homestedt and erect a statue in Lea's honor.

== Development and release ==
Development of the game was started in 2011 by German studio Radical Fish Games. In February 2015 it was introduced as an Indiegogo project, seeking €80 000 in crowdfunding alongside a web-based demo version, which is still accessible on the game's website. The game's early access version was released for Linux, macOS, and Windows on Steam later that year. Initially, the game was envisioned as having a 2016 release date, but development "just took much longer than expected", so it was delayed several times. Although it was initially intended as a crowdfunding reward, the Steam early access release allowed the developers to have a continuous source of income to keep working as needed, and employ player feedback to add more features and balance the game.

Due to the story's importance, the team worked first on gameplay elements, then on the game map, only adding narrative content once all other elements were completed. Around half of the story was delayed until the full release, to allow players to experience the gameplay during early access, since "people only play the story only once mostly". Crosscode's gameplay elements were based on a "lot of different inspirations". The ball-throwing mechanic was taken from Yoshi's Island, while questing and exploration was inspired by games such as the Xenoblade series. However, to prevent it from being a clone of older games, the developers tried to "look at them from a game designer perspective", and not blindly copy their mechanics. They also added features that were not possible in classic games, such as a three-dimensional physics system. Although the game's party system did not have a major impact on gameplay, it was added to fit the MMORPG setting of the narrative.

The Dragon Quest series had a large influence on Crosscode, such as the names of enemies. The graphical style of the game was influenced by old SNES games such as Chrono Trigger and Terranigma. The developers decided to keep the style largely "like in the old games", in contrast to more graphically distinct independent games such as Hyper Light Drifter. However, they still chose to add a few modern graphical elements such as shadow maps, based on their previous experience in the RPG Maker community.

The crowdfunding campaign also included a Wii U version, which was envisioned as using the system's web development toolset, but it was later delayed to prioritise the Steam version. After the Wii U was discontinued, the publishers Deck13 collaborated with the developers to compile the game's JavaScript code into a version compatible with other consoles, as they could not run it natively due to technical and licensing restrictions.

=== Release ===
The full version of the game was officially released out of early access on September 20, 2018, for Linux, macOS, and Windows. This was followed by a release for the Nintendo Switch, alongside PlayStation 4 and Xbox One consoles, on July 9, 2020. The game was included in the launch lineup for Amazon's Luna cloud gaming service on October 20, 2020. An upgrade for Xbox Series X/S featuring and 4K resolution on the latter and high frame rate options was released on November 10, 2020. The game was released for Amazon Luna on November 12, 2020. A PlayStation 5 version was released on June 29, 2021, available for free to owners of the PlayStation 4 version.

The game's official soundtrack was composed by Deniz Akbulut, and was released by video game music label Materia Collective on September 6, 2018, with the vinyl edition releasing in 2021.

An expansion pack for the game, A New Home, was released on February 26, 2021. It includes a new area, a dungeon, and concludes elements of the main game's plot.

== Reception ==
Reception

Aggregate scores
Aggregator	Score
Metacritic	PC: 86/100; NS: 82/100; PS4: 81/100; XONE: 81/100
OpenCritic	87% recommend

Review scores
Publication	Score
GameSpot	6/10
IGN	9.5/10
Nintendo Life	8/10
PlayStation Official Magazine – UK	8/10
PC Games (DE)	8/10
Push Square	8/10

CrossCode received "generally favorable reviews", according to review aggregator Metacritic. Fellow review aggregator OpenCritic assessed that the game received "mighty" approval, being recommended by 87% of critics. IGN Japan scored the game 9.5/10, labelling it a "masterpiece", and German outlet PC Games described it as a "huge, motivating adventure [that] bows with dignity to genre classics of the 16-bit era". Conversely, GameSpot reviewer David Wolinsky called it "overly ambitious and complicated", criticising the puzzles and navigation, but still praising the combat.

Reviewers largely praised the game's combat, with Wolinsky describing it as "deep and deceptively tactical". Writing for IGN Japan, Shohei Fujita appreciated the rewarding nature of its difficulty, stating that the player would cherish the wisdom gained after an intense boss battle. Nintendo Life reviewer Mitch Vogel enjoyed the game's circuit board system, stating that it "ensures that you feel empowered to play CrossCode the way you want to play it".

Critics generally found the puzzles in CrossCode challenging, but were divided on their quality. While Vogel praised the "heightened focus on more complex puzzle design", and Jenny Jones of Push Square referred to the puzzles as "tough but satisfying", other reviewers were sometimes more negative. Wolinsky claimed they could sometimes be "obtuse and annoying", making progress "halting and confusing", but he praised the ability to adjust their difficulty. Though he commended them as "fair and logical", PC Games reviewer Felix Schütz stated the site repeatedly encountered "puzzles that we only crack after dozens of attempts, although we had long understood the principle". GameStar criticised the side quests, stating that many of them "degenerate into lengthy collecting and offer only meager rewards".

Most reviewers positively commented on the game's narrative. Schütz found the MMORPG-like companions amusing, and stated the game "has serious and touching moments to offer". Praising the "game within a game", Vogel described it as "a unique and interesting way of approaching storytelling". Although he appreciated the overall narrative, Fujita stated that it "should have been deeper", claiming that the premise of the game lead to some missed opportunities.

Multiple gaming publications praised the game's artstyle, with Schütz stating it "awakens wonderful memories of 16-bit classics such as Chrono Trigger, Secret of Mana or Terranigma at first glance", and Vogel calling it "pleasingly fluid" and "packed with all kinds of detail and colour". Reviewers playing the game on the Nintendo Switch had minor issues with the game's performance; Vogel noted that "the framerate takes a dive that... is quite noticeable" during busy moments, and Schütz considered the port "a little unclean here and there, but the problems... not so serious that one should therefore advise against buying".

=== Accolades ===
Jason Schreier of Kotaku ranked CrossCode among his top 10 games of 2019. The game won the award for "Most Fulfilling Community-Funded Game" at the SXSW Gaming Awards.
