= Deck13 =

German video game developer and publisher

Deck13 Interactive GmbH
- Formerly: TriggerLab GmbH (2001–2002)
- Type: Subsidiary
- Industry: Video games
- Predecessor: Artex Software
- Founded: 2001; 25 years ago
- Founders: Jan Klose; Florian Stadlbauer
- Headquarters: Frankfurt, Germany
- Area served: Worldwide
- Key people: Lars Janssen; (CEO); Mathias Reichert; (COO)
- Products: Ankh series; Jack Keane series; Lords of the Fallen; The Surge series
- Number of employees: 90 (2024)
- Parent: Focus Entertainment (2020–present)
- Subsidiaries: Deck13 Hamburg; Deck13 Montreal
- Website: deck13.com

Deck13 Interactive GmbH (formerly TriggerLab GmbH) is a German video game developer and publisher based in Frankfurt. The company was founded in July 2001 by the team behind Artex Software, a studio that primarily developed video games for RISC OS, such as Ankh: The Tales of Mystery. Originally bearing the name TriggerLab, the company was renamed to Deck13 after the release of its first game, Stealth Combat, in 2002. Deck13 is best known for developing the action role-playing games Lords of the Fallen and The Surge. Deck13 also operates a Hamburg-based subsidiary studio, Deck13 Hamburg.

== History ==
Deck13 is the successor to Artex Software, a development team that created the game Ankh for RISC OS. The company was founded as TriggerLab in 2001 by Jan Klose and Florian Stadlbauer. TriggerLab developed Stealth Combat, which was first released in Germany on 25 February 2002; shortly thereafter, on 2 April 2002, the company was renamed as Deck13 Interactive. The name "Deck13" was derived from "DM-Deck16", a game map from Unreal Tournament (1999).

In 2005, the humorous adventure game Ankh was released, which was a remake of the 1997 game Ankh: The Tales of Mystery by Artex Software. As the product sold very well and won several awards (especially in Germany), the sequel Ankh: Heart of Osiris was produced and released almost exactly one year later, reusing elements of the previous title. In August 2007, the adventure game Jack Keane was released which was similar to the Ankh series in terms of graphics and gameplay but which was set in England and colonial India. The third part of the Ankh series, The Battle of the Gods, was released in Germany on 19 November 2007. One of their latest games, the role-playing game called Venetica was released in September 2009 and was the first RPG to be published by the company. Afterwards, Deck13 Interactive was working on Blood Knights, a comic hack-and-slash for Microsoft Windows, Xbox 360 and PlayStation 3, which was released in 2013.

In 2015, Deck13 released Lords of the Fallen in co-operation with CI Games. While a sequel was announced by the publisher, Deck13 was not named as the developer. Instead, the studio was announced to be working with Focus Home Interactive on the then-upcoming The Surge. In September 2016, managing director Florian Stadlbauer announced that he had left the company and had since been replaced by Mathias Reichert.

In June 2020, Focus Home Interactive acquired the company for €7.1 million.

In February 2021, Deck13 opened a development studio in Montreal.

== Games developed ==
Year	Title	Publisher(s)
2002	Stealth Combat	Modern Games, Cryo Interactive
2004	Carnival Cruise Lines Tycoon 2005: Island Hopping	Activision Value
2005	Ankh	BHV Software, Viva Media
2005	Luka und das geheimnisvolle Silberpferd	Polizeiliche Kriminalprävention der Länder und des Bundes
2006	Ankh: Heart of Osiris	Xider
2007	Jack Keane	10tacle Studios, Strategy First
2007	Ankh: Battle of the Gods	Daedalic Entertainment, Xider
2008	Luka und der verborgene Schatz	Polizeiliche Kriminalprävention der Länder und des Bundes
2009	Venetica	DTP Entertainment
2010	Black Sails: The Ghost Ship	Astragon
2010	Jade Rousseau: The Secret Revelations – Episode 1: The Fall of Sant' Antonio	Phenomedia
2010	Reading the Dead	Astragon
2011	Haunted	DTP Entertainment, Viva Media
2012	Jack Keane 2: The Fire Within	Astragon
2013	Blood Knights	Kalypso Media
2014	Moorhuhn: Tiger and Chicken	Koch Media
2014	Lords of the Fallen	CI Games
2015	Imagoras	Städel Museum
2017	The Surge	Focus Home Interactive
2019	The Surge 2	Focus Home Interactive
2023	Atlas Fallen	Focus Entertainment

=== Cancelled ===
- The Mystery of the Seven Symbols
- Jade Rousseau: Die Geheimen Evangelien – Episode 2: Die Bruderschaft
- Jade Rousseau: Die Geheimen Evangelien – Episode 3: Das geheime Dossier
- Jade Rousseau: Die Geheimen Evangelien – Episode 4: Der Weg in die Finsternis
- Jade Rousseau: Die Geheimen Evangelien – Episode 5: Die Geister der Vergangenheit
- Jade Rousseau: Die Geheimen Evangelien – Episode 6: Der Zorn Gottes

== Games published ==
Year	Title	Developer(s)	Ref.
2015	The Adventures of Bertram Fiddle – Episode 1: A Dreadly Business	Rumpus Animation	
2015	Super Sky Arena (early access)	Hammer Labs	
2015	Super Snow Fight	Patrick God	
2016	Obliteracers	Varkian Empire	
2016	Hover Cubes: Arena (early access)	Gametology	
2016	Flat Heroes	Parallel Circles	
2016	The Shape of Heart (early access)	Dragon Whisper Games	
2017	Shift Happens	Klonk Games	
2017	The Adventures of Bertram Fiddle – Episode 2: A Bleaker Predicklement	Rumpus Animation	
2018	Wartile	Playwood Project	
2018	To Hell with Hell	Lazurite Games	
2018	vridniX	Uncanaut	
2018	CrossCode	Radical Fish Games	
2019	The Shattering	SuperSexySoftware	
2020	Resolutiion	Monolith of Minds	
2021	Faraday Protocol	Red Koi Box	
2022	Highrise City	FourExo Entertainment	
2022	Holomento (early access)	Sean Weech	
2022	Lunistice	A Grumpy Fox	
2022	Chained Echoes	Matthias Linda	
2024	Drova: Forsaken Kin	Just2D	
2025	Spindle	Wobble Ghost	
2026	Pocket Wheels	Florian Wolf	
2026	Crystals Of Irm	David Schütze	
2027	Forge of the Fae	Datadyne	
TBA	Elements Destiny	ShrooMoon UG	
TBA	Full Circle	2nd Player Games	

== See also ==
- Daedalic Entertainment – German adventure game developer
- House of Tales – German adventure game developer
- King Art Games – German adventure game developer
