= Lords of the Fallen (2014 video game) =

2014 video game

- Developers: Deck13; CI Games (Note: Ported to Android and iOS by Octopus Games)
- Publisher: CI Games (Note: Physical versions published by Bandai Namco Games in North America)
- Director: Jan Klose
- Producer: Tomasz Gop
- Designers: Sven Hammer; Timo Treffer
- Composer: Knut Avenstroup Haugen
- Series: Lords of the Fallen
- Platforms: PlayStation 4; Windows; Xbox One; Android; iOS
- Release: PS4, Windows, Xbox One; 28 October 2014; Android, iOS; 9 February 2017
- Genre: Action role-playing
- Mode: Single-player

Lords of the Fallen is an action role-playing video game developed by Deck13 and CI Games. It was released in October 2014 for PlayStation 4, Xbox One and Windows. A mobile version of the game, which features one-to-one swipe combat controls, was released on 9 February 2017 for iOS and Android, as a paid game with in-app purchases. A reboot of the same name was released in October 2023.

Players journey through large, interconnected environments, battling enemies and bosses using melee weapons, such as axes and hammers. Players control Harkyn as he is sent on a mission to stop a powerful god's mysterious demonic forces as they invade the world to reclaim it after being dethroned.

== Gameplay ==
Lords of the Fallen is a third-person action role-playing game containing a slow tactical approach to close-quarters combat gameplay, with difficult enemies and locations to overcome, while learning from their encounters. The player takes the role of Harkyn, who, from the beginning, can be tailored towards the player's preferred combat styles from a range of different classes, each with their own specializations in certain weapons, armors, spells and abilities. A class is determined based on two major choices of three kinds of magic; brawling, deception and solace, followed by the second choice of three different armor sets; warrior, rogue and cleric. Different combinations of both choices allow the player to choose how to play Harkyn from the start. With sets, the warrior uses heavy-yet-strong armor and weapons, the rogue is much lighter and quicker, and the cleric utilizes staffs and armour that supports spell use. Magic adds to the variability of each class. For example, a warrior set combined with brawling magic creates a pure warrior with high strength and vitality, while a warrior set can also be combined with solace magic to create a paladin class that is not as strong but can specialize in spell usage early in the game. As the player progresses through the game and defeats enemies, experience can be gained and spent to upgrade Harkyn's skills and unlock new spells to use in combat.

The game is divided into acts with hubs and nonlinear gameplay progression through a main central story, with new areas continuously opened as the player progresses while also being allowed to return to previously completed areas. However, each new area has multiple paths, hidden locations, and potential shortcuts and secrets to uncover. Along the way, the player will also encounter non-player characters who offer further information, lore, and in many cases, grant additional tasks to the player for more rewards. In dialogue, the player can also make choices with certain characters and their quests. The game utilizes a checkpoints system that the player must locate and can choose to use to save, replenish consumable items, such as healing potions, and upgrade their character.

Lords of the Fallen uses a "risk and reward" system when it comes to upgrading Harkyn. The amount of experience the player can gain for use can be increased through a multiplier that builds up the longer the player mixes up combo attacks or avoids using checkpoints and spending their experiences. If a checkpoint is used, the multiplier will reset. If a player dies during combat, they will appear at the last checkpoint they used but with previously defeated non-boss enemies respawning back in the original location across the in-game world and losing any unspent experience they have gained since they last spent any. At this point a timer will begin, requiring the player to return to the spot they last died in order to regain what they previously lost. However, if the timer runs out or if the player dies again before reaching this point, the unspent experience they had lost before will be lost for good.

== Plot ==
The game is set in a world long after the defeat of a god named Adyr, that formerly ruled humanity with an iron fist, by three heroes: a rogue, cleric and warrior. They later became known as the Judges and were elevated to the status of demigods. Unusually, all sins are punished, even small and petty ones. Players take on the role of Harkyn, a convicted criminal whose sins are visible on his face, in the form of runes.

Harkyn is released from prison by a monk named Kaslo in order to stop a mysterious invasion of Adyr's demonic forces, the Rhogar, into a monastery near the Hand of God mountains (literally the hand of the fallen god). He comes across a number of powerful beings called Rhogar Lords who are invading from an unknown place into the human realm. With the help of an explorer named Yetka, he is able to discover the location of the Pathway, a portal to the Rhogar Realm; a former temple of Adyr that was banished to another dimension by the Judges and sealed in the monastery.

Harkyn travels to the Rhogar Realm where he meets the Crafter, an immortal, extra-dimensional being whose Crystal of Travels was stolen by the Rhogar. He fights through the realm and takes back the Crystal, stopping the invasion. When he returns to the monastery, he is tasked by Antanas, the leader of the human forces, to slay Adyr, who has revived once again. However, he discovers signs that Antanas is up to no good and fights a monster of unknown origins. Harkyn enters the Chamber of Lies in the Rhogar Realm and unlocks the path to an unusual demon that Yetka says is linked to her family. He can choose to kill it, or let Yetka leave with it. Finally, he defeats the final Lord and speaks to Adyr, who tells him that humanity needs a god to preserve order, showing Antanas imbibing a potion and turning into a hideous monster, as an example of human failings. Adyr gives Harkyn a special rune that can be used to restore Adyr's power. When he returns to the monastery, he is faced by several monsters, confirming that Antanas experimented on monks in order to make mutants that could fight the Rhogar.

Antanas' forces believe Harkyn has turned traitor, since he did not kill Adyr, and attack him. He fights his way to Antanas, and realizes that the mutated Antanas killed Kaslo when he tried to stop him from transforming. Harkyn fights and kills Antanas, and he has the option of using the Rune of Adyr in his weapon to revive Adyr, in his armor to kill Adyr, or giving it to the Crafter for a neutral ending where Adyr remains dormant.

== Reception ==
=== Critical response ===
Reception

Aggregate score
Aggregator	Score
Metacritic	PC: 73/100; PS4: 68/100; XONE: 71/100 iOS: 56/100

Review scores
Publication	Score
Game Informer	8.5/10
GameSpot	8/10
GamesRadar+	3/5
IGN	7.4/10
Polygon	7.5/10
TouchArcade	2.5/5

Lords of the Fallen received mixed or average reviews. Aggregating review website Metacritic gave the Xbox One version 71/100 based on 13 reviews, the Microsoft Windows version 73/100 based on 36 reviews, and the PlayStation 4 version 68/100 based on 45 reviews.

Giving a positive review for Game Informer, Daniel Tack called the game a "surprising sleeper" and scored it an 8.5 out of 10. He stated: "Lords of the Fallen is a surprisingly solid title that wasn't even on my radar. While it borrows heavily from the Dark Souls franchise, it's done well and with its own signature flair. I highly recommend this game to anyone that enjoys that series, and if you haven't gone down that road before, it might be a more forgiving entry point into the action RPG."

GameSpot's Kevin VanOrd gave the game a positive review; he scored it an 8/10 and stated: "Superficially, you could call Lords of the Fallen a Souls game for the meek and the uninitiated. But it earns more respect than such a flippant description. Lords of the Fallen isn't about the game that it isn't, but the game that it is. It's about the ghoulish blacksmith, his glowing eyes, and the long tufts of stiff hair that rise from his scalp. It's about the crunches of iron against bone when your hammer finds its mark. It's about taking in new sights and sounds, and about finding new ways to travel to old ones. It's about that suspended bridge, the monuments that guard it, and the creatures waiting within. Harkyn may have no use for these places, but there are riches inside nonetheless."

Giving a more mixed review was IGN's Leif Johnson. Johnson scored the game a 7.4 out of 10 and stated: "Lords of the Fallen delivers entertaining hack-and-slash combat centered on combos and spells, but its risk-based reward system seems slightly out of place in a world where its hero so easily achieves great power and defense and makes risk obsolete. It achieves its goal of creating a more accessible Dark Souls-style experience, but unfortunately it goes a step or two too far."

Philip Kollar of Polygon scored Lords of the Fallen a 7.5 out of 10. In his review, Kollar thought the game's story, concept and characters were "commendable", liked the slow weapons-based combat, saying that's where the game "shines the brightest", and thought the game had a strong variation on the Souls formula, saying this could be "sign[s] of much brighter things to come". Kollar did, however, criticize the game's technical issues, calling them "near-game-ending", disliked the game's easier difficulty level, saying he would beat certain areas "on the first or second try", and thought the boss battles, and the boss designs, weren't as strong as they should be.

Ben Griffin of GamesRadar praised the game's visuals, long length and combat, but criticized the technical issues, boss fights and lack of co-op. Griffin scored the game a 3/5 and stated: "Taken on its own this is a sophisticated fantasy RPG executed with consideration and thought, but Lords of the Fallen never really escapes the spectre of Souls, and it can only blame itself."

=== Sales ===
By May 2015, over 900,000 copies of the game had been sold.

== Reboot ==
Development of a sequel, Lords of the Fallen 2, was confirmed in December 2014, which was originally set to be released in 2017. CI Games took on development duties for the sequel. In 2018, it entered a partnership with independent Defiant Studios. In April 2020, CI Games announced it had removed Defiant and replaced them with Hexworks, a newly-created subsidiary of CI Games. The game was re-revealed at Gamescom 2022 under the title The Lords of the Fallen, and was released for Microsoft Windows, PlayStation 5 and Xbox Series X/S on 13 October 2023. The game was renamed to Lords of the Fallen at the March 2023 State of Unreal showcase.

Meanwhile, original developer Deck13 Interactive went on to develop The Surge, which is considered a spiritual successor to Lords of the Fallen because of its many gameplay similarities.
