= Crazy Machines =

2005 video game

- Developer: FAKT Software
- Publishers: Novitas Publishing; DTP Entertainment; Pepper Games; Viva Media
- Platforms: Windows, MacOS, Nintendo DS, iOS, Wii
- Release: October 2005: Windows/Mac OS X; WW: October 2005; WW: December 12, 2008 (Steam, Windows-only) Nintendo DS; EU: October 10, 2008 iOS; NA: April 9, 2009 Wii; EU: August 13, 2010; NA: June 14, 2011
- Genre: Puzzle
- Mode: Single-player

Crazy Machines is a puzzle video game created by German studio FAKT Software. Crazy Machines based many of its ideas on The Incredible Machine series of games. The player is given a set of mechanical components to construct a Rube Goldberg-style or Heath Robinson-style intricate machine to solve a goal and advance to the next puzzle in the game.

An iOS version of the game was released in 2009.

== Gameplay ==
In the game, players build imaginative machines that turn cranks, rotate gears, pull levers, and more to build a unique contraption. The player can solve more than 200 challenging puzzles and experiment with gears, robots, explosives, and more in a virtual lab. The game uses a physics engine to simulate various in-game variables such as air pressure, electricity, gravity, and particle effects.

== See also ==
- Crazy Machines 2
- The Incredible Machine
