= Ankh: Heart of Osiris =

2006 video game

- Cover art
- Developer: Deck13 Interactive
- Publisher: Xider
- Engine: OGRE, PINA
- Platforms: Linux, Mac OS X, Windows
- Release: GER: October 30, 2006; FRA: November 17, 2006; UK: May 18, 2007
- Genre: Third-person adventure
- Mode: Single-player

Ankh: Heart of Osiris (German: Ankh: Herz des Osiris) is the second game in the Ankh series of video games. The game was released in Germany on October 30, 2006, in France on November 17, and in the United Kingdom on May 18, 2007. The development team originally considered to make the game as an expansion pack to Ankh, but was later developed as a pseudo-sequel to the first game.

== Plot ==
Assil has just returned to Cairo weeks after he had dispelled Osiris' curse and finds that the holy ankh has vanished. Assil needs to recover the ankh before Osiris can unleash another curse on Egypt.

== Gameplay ==
Screenshot depicting the game visuals and interface.

The game contains three playable characters: Assil, Thara and the Pharaoh. Gameplay is similar to the Runaway series. The game requires clicking on objects and places in the area to solve puzzles and progress. By default the player will be able to move the playable character around. When the mouse pointer is hovered over a particular something, the icon changes to match a different action such as Looking, Taking, Talking and Using. Items in the inventory can be looked at by left clicking on them and used by right clicking on them.

One puzzle served as a copyright protection measure, in which the player was required to use a code wheel provided with the game copy to solve the combination in order to continue the game.

== Development ==
During the game's development, Deck13 revised the puzzles and content based on feedback from the previous game, while trying to balance the storyline and gameplay as well as the difficulty of the puzzles.

== Reception ==
=== Domestic ===
Reception

Review scores
Publication	Score
PC Games	84/100
PC Action	87%
4Players	84%

=== International ===
Reception

Aggregate score
Aggregator	Score
GameRankings	72.62%

Review score
Publication	Score
Eurogamer	8/10
