= The Surge =

2017 video game

- Developer: Deck13 Interactive
- Publisher: Focus Home Interactive
- Director: Jan Klose
- Producers: Johannes Bickle; Max Kübler
- Artists: Attila Grőb; Richard Masa
- Writer: Simon H. Mackenzie
- Composer: Markus Schmidt
- Engine: Fledge
- Platforms: Microsoft Windows; PlayStation 4 Xbox One
- Release: Windows, PS4, Xbox One; 16 May 2017; Amazon Luna; 20 October 2020
- Genre: Action role-playing
- Mode: Single-player

The Surge is a 2017 action role-playing video game developed by Deck13 Interactive and published by Focus Home Interactive. The game was released for PlayStation 4, Windows, and Xbox One on 16 May 2017, while an Amazon Luna version released on 20 October 2020.

The Surge is considered a spiritual successor to Deck13 Interactive's earlier action role-playing game Lords of the Fallen, with which it shares many gameplay features. Deck13 Interactive described the game as inspired by Rise of the Robots and the Dark Souls series.

== Gameplay ==
The Surge is designed in the challenging role-playing game style of the Dark Souls series of games. The gameplay involves players using an exoskeleton to battle enemies. The exoskeleton can be customized through the game using "modular upgrades", according to the developer. The combat allows players to target different body parts of enemies, as well as utilize finishing moves often ending in dismemberment in bullet time fashion.

== Plot ==
The game takes place in a dystopian future where mankind has exhausted the world's resources, leading to strained social service and environmental diseases. According to the developers, the game paints a grim portrait of the future where the evolution of technology in relation to society and the environment has led to a decadent era for humanity. The proliferation of drones and working robots has created mass unemployment, with humans forced to resort to augmentations and powered rigs to keep up with a far more efficient equivalent.

The player takes control of Warren, a new employee on his first day on the job on board a bullet train towards the headquarters of CREO, one of the largest tech conglomerates now controlling the world, renowned for its revolutionary breakthroughs in a multitude of fields, from common household items to advanced exoskeletons. Its most relevant activity however is "Project reSOLVE", ideated by its founder Jonah Guttenberg, which involves a complex chemical formula dispersed via rockets to slowly reseed the Earth's damaged atmosphere, as well as boost the growth of flora worldwide.

After choosing a starting robotic rig, Warren (who uses a wheelchair) is prepared for surgical implantation of an advanced CREO exoskeleton, gone horribly wrong when the automated system fails to sedate him, painfully grafting each component until he passes out during neurosurgery. Waking up, Warren finds the facility in ruins, with drones attacking personnel and fellow workers prey to a deranged bloodthirst. Guided by an executive known only as "Sally", Warren is forced to traverse the entire complex, up to the Executive Forum, in order to find out what exactly happened.

As the player gathers audiologs, meets different NPCs, and explores the decadent structures, it becomes evident that Project reSOLVE is indeed working, but at a pace far too slow to ensure mankind's survival, along with unspecified long-term toxicity. Under pressure, the CREO board of directors chose to fast-track "Project UTOPIA", which involved large-scale usage of nanites to achieve the intended result much faster, but at the expense of killing off 95% of the human race after its initial deployment. Battling his way into the Executive Forum and disabling its firewall, Warren is exposed to the truth about the plot and CREO: as the board of directors debated whether or not to launch UTOPIA's rockets, its nanites became self-aware and, in an attempt at self-preservation, created a system-wide crash (the eponymous surge) that corrupted every human and machine connected to CREO's network. The devastation destroyed CREO's governing AIs ("Sally" being one of them) and killed off its executives. As the last one dies, UTOPIA's launch is authorized by the automated system.

Warren subsequently advances through UTOPIA's launch platform in order to stop the rocket, until he is confronted by an amalgam of the nanites' consciousnesses, the "Rogue Process". Upon its defeat, the player is presented with two different endings:

- if a plot-critical audiolog was recovered and uploaded into the rocket's payload, the nanites will be rendered inert. A United States Army squad is sent to investigate the now silent facility, succumbing quickly to its deranged denizens and a still alive Rogue Process. Realizing the danger, further military action is taken.
- if the payload was launched intact, worldwide communication and radar equipment will quickly start to fail as the Rogue Process takes them over, dooming mankind. This ending is considered canon in The Surge 2.

Regardless of the player's choice, an epilogue is played from Warren's perspective as he slowly crawls out of the wrecked maglev station he initially arrived in, his exoskeleton gravely damaged and disabled, cutting to black just as he is within reach of his wheelchair.

== Development ==
Development of The Surge began in August 2015. The first concept art and pre-alpha gameplay footage was publicly shown in March 2016, in advance to German site PC Games Hardware. The game is powered by the FLEDGE engine, developed from scratch by Deck13 Interactive for PlayStation 4 and Xbox One, and features integration of Nvidia GameWorks. The game was released on 16 May 2017 for Microsoft Windows, PlayStation 4, and Xbox One, and on 20 October 2020 for Amazon Luna.

== Reception ==
Reception

Aggregate score
| Aggregator | Score |
|---|---|
| Metacritic | PC: 72/100; PS4: 73/100; XONE: 74/100 |

Review scores
| Publication | Score |
|---|---|
| Destructoid | 6.5/10 |
| Electronic Gaming Monthly | 6.5/10 |
| Game Informer | 7/10 |
| GameSpot | 7/10 |
| IGN | 7.9/10 |
| PC Gamer (US) | 60/100 |
| Polygon | 8/10 |

The Surge received "mixed or average" reviews, according to review aggregator Metacritic.

IGN stated, "The Surge makes good use of its detailed sci-fi setting and provides an engaging experience throughout the 30 to 40-hour campaign, mostly thanks to its widely customizable inventory and wickedly fun combat system. It may struggle to keep the action moving and tell a strong story amid the chaos of battle, and its weapon progression plateaued early, but it offers some interesting ideas and delivers a solid new take on a familiar genre." While Game Informer stated, "I didn't mind investing over 50 hours to the grind in The Surge. I felt powerful at times and exploring every little area rewarded me with a nice bounty. It just clings too tightly to a one-note approach to world building, enemy encounters, and level design. This is a genre that has a rich history of wowing players, sometimes from the look of a boss, and maybe even the design of the world it inhabits. I was never dazzled by The Surge. I mostly felt like I was battling animated junk in a junkyard."

== Sequel ==
It was announced on February 8, 2018 that a sequel was in early development for a 2019 release. The Surge 2 was released on September 24, 2019, on PC, PS4 and Xbox One.
