= Red Ocean =

2007 video game

- Developer: Collision Studios
- Publisher: DTP Entertainment
- Platform: Microsoft Windows
- Release: GER: 16 March 2007; UK: 21 September 2007; AU: 26 October 2007
- Genre: First-person shooter
- Mode: Single-player

Red Ocean is a 2007 first-person shooter video game developed by German company Collision Studios.

== Plot ==
Jack Hard hires a fellow diver to explore an old World War II submarine. He soon finds that there is an entrance to an underground complex nearby. An operative contacts him over the radio telling him that his fellow diver is actually a member of the CIA. Jack then soon finds him dead and must take up the fight. The plot takes place in an abandoned, underwater, secret Soviet base that has been taken over by terrorists.

== Gameplay ==
Red Ocean is a first-person shooter game. Jack Hard is tasked with exploring various locations in the underwater Soviet base, while defeating enemies and engaging in scuba diving.

== Reception ==
Reception

Aggregate score
Aggregator	Score
GameRankings	43.50%

Red Ocean received mixed reviews from critics upon release. On GameRankings, the game holds a score of 43.50% based on two reviews.

The game was awarded the 2007 Deutscher Entwicklerpreis award in the category for "Best German Action Game".
