= Jack Keane (video game) =

2007 video game

- Developer: Deck13 Interactive
- Publishers: UK: 10tacle Studios; NA: Strategy First; RuneSoft (Linux/Mac)
- Engine: OGRE
- Platforms: Microsoft Windows, Linux, Mac OS X
- Release: GER: August 1, 2007; 18 years ago; UK: March 14, 2008; 18 years ago; NA: April 15, 2008; 18 years ago
- Genre: Adventure
- Mode: Single-player

Jack Keane is a 2007 point-and-click adventure game developed by Deck13 Interactive, published by 10tacle Studios, and digitally distributed by Legacy Interactive. Jack Keane is an adventure game in the spirit of Monkey Island, with references to well-known computer games and classic films. Players assume the role of a hapless, swashbuckling adventurer and accompany him in his travels across 15 locations throughout London, Cape Town, and Tooth Island. The game contains various humorous references, e.g. regarding Indiana Jones, the Monkey Island adventure game series, the computer game Ankh, Star Wars, the TV series Lost and the Lord of the Rings films.

== Plot ==
In colonial England, under a certain amount of duress, Jack takes on a job which will not only cause him a great deal of trouble, but also bring to light the answer to a mystery out of his distant past. A lack of money leads Jack to accept a charter to take a British secret agent to mysterious Tooth Island. When Jack's ship shatters on the mysterious island's cliffs on arrival and the secret agent quickly becomes a meal for a monster in the jungle, Jack is soon left to cope with the situation on his own. Players interact with dozens of characters and use more than 250 found objects to solve puzzles, as Jack moves closer to solving the mystery of his past and how it ties in with the present.

== Reception ==
Reception

Review scores
Publication	Score
4Players	79/100
PC Games	84/100
PC Action	86%

== Sequel ==
A sequel, Jack Keane 2: The Fire Within, was released in 2013.
