= The Black Mirror (video game) =

2003 video game

- North American cover art
- Developer: Future Games
- Publishers: CZE: Future Games; NA: The Adventure Company; UK: GMX Media
- Platform: Windows
- Release: CZE: 15 March 2003; NA: 15 October 2003; UK: 28 May 2004
- Genre: Adventure
- Mode: Single-player

The Black Mirror is a third-person point-and-click horror adventure game developed in 2003 by Czech company Future Games. Its original name is Posel Smrti (Czech: Death's Messenger). The game features 150 locations and 5 hours of spoken dialogue. The Black Mirror became a commercial success, with 500,000 units sold worldwide by 2008. It was particularly successful in Germany, under publisher DTP Entertainment. Two sequels, Black Mirror II: Reigning Evil and Black Mirror III: Final Fear, were released.

Additionally, a reboot titled Black Mirror was released in November 2017. However, it was not as successful as the original. A prequel to the original trilogy was recently announced in 2025.

== Gameplay ==
The exterior of Black Mirror Castle

== Plot ==
The story takes place in August 1981, primarily at Black Mirror, the ancestral manor of the Gordon family located in Suffolk, England. The protagonist, Samuel Gordon, is forced to return to the Black Mirror manor after 12 years of absence upon hearing of the death of his grandfather, William Gordon. Despite the mysterious circumstances surrounding William's death, it is considered a suicide by everyone except for Samuel.

Upon his arrival in Black Mirror, Samuel begins investigating his grandfather's death. Samuel's investigation soon reveals that his grandfather had interests in the arcane, and up until his death had spent nearly every waking hour working to uncover the mystery of the Gordon family's curse. From his grandfather's writings and other sources, Samuel discovers that centuries ago, in the 1200s, the Gordon line began with two brothers, Marcus and Mordred Gordon. The eldest, Mordred, was a monster of a man, opening a dark portal known as the Black Mirror deep under where the manor now stands. The younger, Marcus, fought his brother, killing him and containing - but not closing - the Black Mirror. In his dying breath the elder cursed the younger, stating that he and his descendants would be forever cursed until five souls were sacrificed and his evil was unleashed once more. William's notes also speak of five sacred keys required to shut the portal for good, entrusted to different members of the Gordon family. Samuel then begins his quest to seek out the five sacred keys and close the Black Mirror permanently.

As the story progresses, further strange and unexpected deaths occur to individuals around Black Mirror, each one accompanied by a strange blood-red sigil. Samuel travels the land around Black Mirror, visiting a local town, chapel, and sanatorium, and also at one point travels to his family's second manor in Wales to obtain a key there. At long last Samuel obtains the five keys, but moments later also discovers the horrifying truth: he is the killer responsible for all the deaths, ending the lives of the victims in his sleep; this is the nature of the Gordon family curse. Samuel enters the catacombs beneath the mansion, enters the Black Mirror, and using the five keys seals the portal. After this, unable to live with the atrocities he has committed, Samuel jumps from the top of the mansion, falling onto the same spiked fence which killed his grandfather.

The game is divided into six chapters:

- Chapter I: Return of the Future
- Chapter II: Back to the Light
- Chapter III: Hidden Legacy
- Chapter IV: Forgotten Bound
- Chapter V: Confession of the Truth
- Chapter VI: Look Through the Mirror

== Development ==
The game's development started in early 2000 with a development team of 5 people. The release date was initially late 2002, but after slight delays, it was released in March 2003.

== Reception ==
=== Sales ===
A few weeks after The Black Mirror's initial release in the Czech Republic, Marcel Speta of Future Games reported that it was selling adequately and according to company forecasts. GMX Media president Eugene Perry remarked in March 2004 that the game had "been very successful in every territory", and Future Games saw it as a "solid" seller in the United States. Its global sales left the developer "extremely satisfied" by that May, according to Future's Martin Malík. At the time, it had just launched in Germany, and the company was hopeful regarding its performance in the region. It claimed position #1 on Amazon.de's sales rankings upon release, although Carsten Fichtelmann of German publisher DTP Entertainment noted that certain brick and mortar stores had ordered "very small" shipments, a decision he considered to be a mistake.

The Black Mirror ultimately surpassed DTP's sales forecasts and became a hit in Germany. 4players reported that it was "by far" Germany's most successful adventure title during 2004's first six months, and that its sales proved the adventure genre's health in the country. That September, DTP reiterated that it was performing "extremely well in the German-speaking territories", and that strong sales persisted "many months after" its initial launch. He noted that it was catching up to the sales of DTP's most popular adventure release, Runaway: A Road Adventure, which had sold 60,000 units in Germany and had earlier helped to revive the country's adventure game industry. The Black Mirror maintained its status as Germany's top-selling adventure of 2004 through the end of the year; Chris Kellner of DTP believed that the game's German sales surpassed its commercial performance anywhere else. Alongside Sherlock Holmes: The Case of the Silver Earring and The Moment of Silence, The Black Mirror contributed to DTP's large-scale growth during 2004.

The Black Mirror went on to sell above 100,000 units in Germany alone. According to Future Games, global sales surpassed 500,000 units by late 2008.

=== Critical reviews ===
Reception

Review scores
Publication	Score
Computer Games Magazine	2.5/5
Computer Gaming World	2/5
PC Gamer (US)	72%

According to Gameswelt, The Black Mirror received harsh reviews from critics in the United States. Scott Osborne, writing for GameSpot, admired the length, locations, challenge and atmosphere of the game, but criticised the voice acting and writing.

4Players named The Black Mirror 2004's best adventure game. In 2011, Adventure Gamers named Black Mirror the 83rd-best adventure game ever released.

== Legacy ==
=== Sequels ===
Black Mirror II: Reigning Evil
- Developer: Cranberry Production
- Publisher: Viva Media
- Platform: Windows
- Release: September 25, 2009
- Genre: Adventure
- Mode: Single-player

Black Mirror III: Final Fear
- Developer: Cranberry Production
- Publisher: Viva Media
- Platform: Windows
- Release: April 9, 2011
- Genres: Adventure, horror
- Mode: Single-player

German-based Cranberry Production developed a sequel, Black Mirror II, in 2009. It takes place in November 1993, twelve years after the original game.

A second and final sequel by Cranberry Production, Black Mirror III, was released in 2011. The story connects with the end of Black Mirror II and features two playable characters.

=== Reboot ===
KING Art Games and THQ Nordic released Black Mirror, a modern re-imagining of the series. It features a new cast and is set in 1926. It is not a point-and-click game, unlike previous entries in the series.

=== Prequel ===
The campaign for the prequel to The Black Mirror, named Messenger of the Death: Blood Bond, was announced by one of the original game's developers in 2025. The game's story begins in 1828, a dark period in the history of the city of Edinburgh. In this year, Edinburgh was marked by murders and the abduction of numerous bodies. Their bodies were disappearing for both scientific purposes and for more gruesome purposes.

The plot of Blood Bond is inspired by these true events, but the main events and plot of the entire game are connected primarily to the mysterious curse of the Gordon family, which has been in their bloodline for centuries. The main character of the game is Joshua Gordon, a descendant of a distant branch of the Gordon family. Joshua has dedicated much of his life to searching for bits and pieces of the truth about the ancient curse of his family. When Joshua hears news of the dark events in Edinburgh, he doesn't hesitate for a moment and sets out to verify what he has been learning and hiding for so long about the curse of his family.
