= Crazy Machines 2 =

2007 video game

- Developers: Fakt Software; DTP Entertainment (iOS)
- Publishers: Viva Media (PC); DTP Entertainment
- Series: Crazy Machines
- Platforms: Microsoft Windows, Nintendo DS, iOS
- Release: Windows: GER: October 15, 2007; NA: June 20, 2008; Nintendo DS: EU: October 16, 2009; iOS; June 29, 2011
- Genre: Puzzle
- Mode: Single-player

Crazy Machines 2 is a puzzle video game developed by German studios Fakt Software and DTP Entertainment for Microsoft Windows, Nintendo DS, and iOS. It is the sequel to Crazy Machines.

== Gameplay ==
The goal in Crazy Machines 2 is to solve a seemingly simple problem (cook a hot dog, pop a balloon) by constructing a Heath Robinson / Rube Goldberg-esque machine. The 3D game relies heavily on in-game physics and utilises NVidia PhysX. For any given puzzle, the player is provided with a collection of items e.g. ramps, springs, steam engines, electrical devices, gears, belts, and a large selection of other mechanical devices for converting and directing raw energy into useful motion. On the completion of each puzzle, the player is rewarded with points and a gold, silver, or bronze lug nut. Not only does the created machine have to perform the assigned primary task, but might also complete one or more of the optional secondary tasks thus earning more points.

== Reception ==
Reception

Aggregate score
Aggregator	Score
Metacritic	72/100

Review scores
Publication	Score
GameRevolution	B+
GameZone	8.2/10
IGN	6.8/10
Jeuxvideo.com	14/20
PC Format	70%
PC Gamer (UK)	65%
PC Zone	82%

The PC version received "mixed or average reviews" according to the review aggregation website Metacritic. GameZone were impressed by the number of puzzles, saying, "Now the game has like 200 puzzles to complete, which is an astonishing number," and that the game was "Easy to use, forward thinking and inventive," being "really a delight to play." IGN were less keen, saying, "The core gameplay mechanics are solid," but "Crazy Machines 2 is at times poorly constructed."

== See also ==
- Crazy Machines
- The Incredible Machine (series)
