= Racer (simulator) =

2012 video game

Racer Free Car Simulator
- Developer(s): Ruud van Gaal
- Publisher(s): Dolphinity
- Designer(s): Ruud van Gaal
- Engine: OpenGL
- Platform(s): Microsoft Windows, Linux, Mac OS X
- Release: 9 August 2012
- Genre(s): Sim racing
- Mode(s): Single-player, multiplayer

Racer, fully named Racer Free Car Simulator, is a freeware and source available video game simulator that runs on Microsoft Windows, Linux, and Mac OS X.

Although Racer started out as a driving simulator, it also has features that are usually seen in racing games, such as racing against AI cars, or against human opponents in multiplayer mode. Its weak points, when compared with commercial racing games, is the absence of wear/damage physics or a career mode.

== History ==
The first version of Racer was released on 29 August 2000. Over the years, a community has grown around Racer. The software itself is maintained exclusively by creator Ruud van Gaal. An important characteristic of Racer is its openness; the formats for cars, tracks and other data are documented. Furthermore, tools to aid in car and track creation are part of the release. As a result, a large number of cars has been created and published, in a large variety: Formula One, GT, vintage, trucks, daily drivers, luxury sedans, and even a shopping trolley has been modeled. Likewise, tracks are available in various types, from true racing circuits to drag strips, mountain roads, and even a car park.

== Licensing ==
The Racer software is free, in the sense of freeware for non-commercial users. While the source code of an older version (0.5) was made available under GPL, later versions are not under an open-source license. The cars and tracks have various forms of license, but can all be downloaded for free.

Whilst one of the strengths of Racer is its open file format, perhaps one of its weaknesses is its closed-source stance and development team. The Racer community contributes to testing and suggesting features that should be added, but the development side of Racer is much based on the amount of time the developers have to contribute towards it. This translates to infrequent updates of varying quality, but updates are often feature-rich and inspire a new burst of energy into the development and modification of cars and tracks.

== See also ==
- List of open source games
