= DTP Entertainment =

Game developer from Germany

DTP Entertainment AG
- Type: Private
- Industry: Video games
- Founded: 1995; 31 years ago
- Defunct: 2012
- Fate: Insolvency
- Headquarters: Hamburg, Germany
- Revenue: c. €50 million
- Number of employees: c. 140 (as of 2014)
- Subsidiaries: Cranberry Productions; RealU; House of Tales
- Website: dtp-entertainment.com

DTP Entertainment AG (formerly known as DTP Neue Medien AG) was a German video game publisher founded in 1995 by Thomas Baur and located in Hamburg. At its time, it was one of Germany's leading game publishers. DTP was known for having published a high number of games which were developed in Germany, especially adventure games. The company was also acting as a video game distributor.

In 2004, a new subsidiary, DTP Young Entertainment, was opened, which specialises in development and publishing of educational software and games for children. In 2007, DTP Entertainment bought 4HEAD Studios and changed it into Cranberry Productions, which is located in Hannover, and opened a new studio, RealU, located in Singapore. In 2008, DTP bought House of Tales, a Bremen-based developer.

In 2012 the company declared insolvency. Since then, several adventure licenses have been picked up by Swedish publisher Nordic Games.

== Games published ==
- Crash Time 5 - Undercover (2012)
- Awesomenauts (2012)
- TNT Racers (2012)
- Crazy Machines Elements (2011)
- The Cursed Crusade (2011)
- Crash Time 4 - The Syndicate (2010)
- Gray Matter (2010)
- Crazy Golf (2010)
- Drakensang: The River of Time (2010)
- Black Sails: Das Geisterschiff (2010)
- So Blonde: Back to the Island (2010)
- King's Bounty: Armored Princess (2010)
- Black Mirror II (2009)
- Venetica (2009)
- Divinity II: Ego Draconis (2009)
- Crazy Machines 2 (2009)
- Giana Sisters DS (2009)
- Memento Mori (2008)
- So Blonde (2008)
- Windchaser (2008)
- Drakensang: The Dark Eye (2008)
- Red Ocean (2007)
- Legend – Hand of God (2007)
- Undercover: Doppeltes Spiel (2007)
- The Mystery of the Druids (2001)
