= Ankh (video game) =

2005 video game

- Developers: Deck13 Interactive (Windows); VIS Games (DS)
- Publishers: BHV Software (Windows); Xider Games (DS); Daedalic Entertainment (DS)
- Designer: Timm Schwank
- Engine: OGRE
- Platforms: Linux, Mac OS X, Windows, Nintendo DS
- Release: November 4, 2005: Windows; GER: November 4, 2005; EU: February 3, 2006; NA: August 31, 2006 Linux; WW: December 17, 2006 OS X; GER: December 18, 2006; EU: May 2007 Nintendo DS; EU: September 17, 2008
- Genre: Adventure
- Mode: Single-player

Ankh is a graphic adventure game by German developer Deck13 and published by bhv Software in 2005. It has a 3D environment with cinematic camera movement and incorporates humor. Ankh is a remake of Ankh: The Tales of Mystery, a 1998 adventure game developed by Artex Software for the Acorn Archimedes.

Ankh spawned two sequels: Ankh: Heart of Osiris and Ankh: Battle of the Gods. In 2006, the original Ankh was ported to Linux and OS X. A Special Edition of the game was released in the UK in February 2007. A Nintendo DS port was released in 2008 under the title Ankh: Curse of the Scarab King (German: Ankh: Der Fluch des Skarabäenkönigs).

== Plot ==
Screenshot showing the game interface

The player takes the role of Assil, the son of a respected architect in Cairo. Assil is a party animal but at some point one of his party-nights turned out sour. When he tries to have some fun in the pyramids with two friends of his, he accidentally breaks some urns and thus disturbs the mummy resting in the pyramid. The mummy punishes Assil by placing a death curse on him, and now he has 24 hours to remove the curse and save himself. Later in the game Assil meets the Arabian ambassador's daughter Thara, who is also a playable character.

Jan Klose, creative director at Deck13 Interactive, also cited Monkey Island to be an influence for the Ankh series.

== Development ==
The soundtrack for the game was composed by Dynamedion and was rated as 1st place for "Best German Soundtrack 2005". According to GameStar, Ankh was produced on a small budget "in the low six-digit range".

== Reception ==
Domestic reception

Review scores
Publication	Score
GameStar	78/100
PC Games	85/100
4Players	85/100
PC Action	86%

Ankh was a commercial hit in the German market, with sales of 100,000 units in that region alone. The Kölner Stadt-Anzeiger reported that it also saw success worldwide. According to Deck13, the combined global sales of Ankh and its first two sequels—Heart of Osiris and Battle of the Gods—surpassed 500,000 units by August 2009.

International reception

Aggregate score
Aggregator	Score	
Aggregator	DS	PC
Metacritic	61/100	74/100

Review scores
Publication	Score	
Publication	DS	PC
Adventure Gamers	0.5/5	3.5/5
Eurogamer	N/A	6/10
GamesMaster	N/A	88%
GameSpot	N/A	7.3/10
GameZone	N/A	7.8/10
NGamer	50%	N/A
PC Gamer (UK)	N/A	76%
PC Zone	N/A	68%
VideoGamer.com	N/A	8/10

The Microsoft Windows and Nintendo DS versions received "mixed or average reviews" according to the review aggregation website Metacritic.
