= UC2 =

UC2 may refer to:

- German submarine UC-2
  - SM UC-2, a German World War I submarine
- German Type UC II submarine of World War II
- UC2 Kraka, a Danish private diesel-electric submarine
- uranium acetylide (UC_{2}) see Uranium carbide
- .uc2, archive format for the UltraCompressor II; see List of archive formats

== See also ==
- UCC (disambiguation)
- UC (disambiguation)
