= List of games distributed by Red Ant Enterprises =

Red Ant Enterprises was an Australia-based producer and distributor of video games for multiple platforms, as well as videos and software. The company went into receivership in January, 2009.

== List by publisher ==
=== 1C ===
==== PC ====
- Ascension to the Throne
- UFO Trilogy
- Deus Ex Game of the Year Edition

=== 505 Games ===
==== PC ====
- ArmA: Armed Assault
- ArmA: Queens Gambit

==== Nintendo DS ====
- Big Catch: Bass Fishing
- Brain Buster
- Cookie & Cream
- Cooking Mama
- Cooking Mama 2
- Cooking Mama Wii
- Dave Mirra BMX Challenge
- Deep Labyrinth
- Draglade
- Fashion Designer: Style Icon
- Hoshigami
- Kameleon
- Kira Kira Pop Princess
- Labyrinth
- MinDStorm
- Monster Bomber
- Monster Puzzle
- My Pet Dolphin
- Mystery Detective
- New Touch Party Game
- Princess on Ice
- Spellbound
- Starz
- The Professor's Brain Trainer: Memory
- Professor's Brain Trainer: Logic
- Turn It Around
- World Championship Poker Deluxe Series

==== Xbox 360 ====
- A-Train HX
- Supreme Commander

==== Wii ====
- Bust-A-Move Wii
- Guilty Gear XX Accent Core
- Radio Helicopter
- Table Football

==== PS3 ====
- Armoured Core 4

==== PSP ====
- Aces of War
- Armored Core: Formula Front
- Exit 2
- Gurumin
- Riviera

==== PS2 ====
- Armored Core: Last Raven
- Brunswick Pro Bowling
- Forty 4 Party
- Harvest Moon: A Wonderful Life
- Michigan: Report from Hell
- Playwize Poker and Casino
- Raw Danger
- Samurai Western
- Stella Deus
- World Championship Poker: Featuring Howard Lederer "All In"

=== Ascaron ===
==== PC ====
- Arena Wars
- Attack on Pearl Harbor
- Dark Star One
- Sacred
- Sacred Plus
- Tortuga Two Treasures

=== Bethesda ===
==== PC ====
- Fallout 3
- Sea Dogs
- The Elder Scrolls III: Morrowind

==== Xbox 360 ====
- Fallout 3

==== Wii ====
- AMF Bowling Pinbusters!
- Star Trek: Conquest

==== Nintendo DS ====
- Ducati Moto

==== PS3 ====
- Fallout 3

==== PS2 ====
- Star Trek: Conquest

=== Big Bytes ===
==== PC ====
- 1001 Puzzles - The Puzzle Collection
- Aussie Video Slots
- Babyz
- Big Mother Truckers 2: Truck Me Harder
- Brain Training: Deluxe Edition
- Brian Lara International Cricket 2005
- Capitalism II
- Carmageddon
- Cats 5
- Chessmaster 8000
- Conflict: Desert Storm
- Conquest
- Crazy Frog Racer
- Crazy Golf: World Tour
- Dark Star One: BB
- Dino Crisis 2
- Dogs 5
- Earth 2150
- Europa Universalis
- FlatOut
- Ford Racing 3
- Tom Clancy's Ghost Recon
- Ghostmaster
- Hearts of Iron
- Hello Kitty: Roller Rescue
- Heroes of the Pacific
- IGI 2: Covert Strike
- IL-2: Sturmovik
- International Cricket Captain Ashes Year 2005
- Jacked
- Junior Board Games
- Korea: Forgotten Conflict
- Magic Solitaire
- Mahjongg
- Marine Sharpshooter
- Micro Machines V4
- My Animal Hospital
- My Pony Stables BB
- Myst Masterpiece
- Patrician III
- Perfect Sudoku & Kakuro Classics
- Pet Tycoon
- Poker Masters
- Port Royale: Gold, Power and Pirates
- Port Royale 2
- Prisoner of War
- Ravenshield
- Rayman 2
- Resident Evil 3
- Rogue Spear Phantom
- Sacred Gold
- Sacred Plus
- SCAR : Squadra Corse Alfa Romeo
- Sensible Soccer 2006
- The Settlers IV
- The Settlers III
- Silent Hunter II
- Soldiers: Heroes of War 2
- Space Invaders Anniversary
- Starship Troopers
- Starsky and Hutch
- Sudden Strike: Gold Edition
- Taito Legends 2
- The Elder Scrolls III:Morrowind
- The Entente
- The Sudoku Challenge
- Worms 2

==== PS2 ====
- Big Mother Truckers 2: Truck Me Harder
- Crazy Frog Racer
- Jacked
- Taito Legends 2

==== Nintendo DS ====
- Crazy Frog Racer

=== Black Bean ===
==== PS2 ====
- Australian Idol Sing
- Diabolik: The Original Sin
- SBK: World Superbike Championship 2007
- The History Channel: Great Battles of Rome

==== Nintendo DS ====
- Evolution GT
- History: Great Empires Rome
- Superbike Riding Challenge
