= UCC =

The initialism UCC may stand for:

== Law ==
- Uniform civil code of India, referring to proposed Civil code in the legal system of India, which would apply equally to all irrespective of their religion
- Uniform Commercial Code, a 1952 uniform act to harmonize state contract law for the sale of goods in the respective states of the United States
- the Union Customs Code of the European Union Customs Union, gradually implemented from 1 May 2016
- Universal Copyright Convention, adopted at Geneva in 1952, is one of the two principal international conventions protecting copyright

== Science and technology ==
- Unified Communications Certificate
- Uniform Code Council, former name of GS1 US
- Unique Country Code
- Unitary Coupled Cluster, a kind of coupled cluster in computational chemistry
- Unlock CPU Core, a technology in ASRock motherboards
- Upper camel case, a writing style for compound words used primarily in encoding where each word is capitalized as in UpperCamelCase
- Urothelial cell carcinoma
- User-created content (user-generated content), a Web 2.0 component
- UCC, a codon for the amino acid serine
- Unified communications and collaboration

== Churches ==
- United Christian Church, a small evangelical body of Christians with roots in the pietistic movement of Martin Boehm and Philip William Otterbein
- United Church of Canada, the largest Protestant Christian denomination in Canada
- United Church of Christ, a mainline Protestant Christian denomination primarily in the Reformed tradition
- Ukrainian Catholic Church, the largest Eastern Rite Catholic sui juris particular church in full communion with the Holy See

== Educational institutions ==
=== Africa ===
- University of Cape Coast, a university located in Cape Coast, Central Region, Ghana

=== Americas ===
- Umpqua Community College, a community college in Roseburg, Oregon, US
- Union County College, a two-year college throughout Union County, New Jersey
- Catholic University of Córdoba (Spanish: Universidad Católica de Córdoba), a private Jesuit university in Córdoba, Argentina
- Universidad Central del Caribe (Spanish for 'Central University of the Caribbean'), a private university in Bayamón, Puerto Rico
- University of the Commonwealth Caribbean, a university in Kingston, Jamaica, previously known as University College of the Caribbean
- University College of the Cariboo, a university college in Kamloops, British Columbia, Canada renamed Thompson Rivers University in 2004
- Upper Canada College, an independent school located in Toronto, Ontario, Canada
- Ursuline College Chatham, a secondary school in Chatham-Kent, Ontario, Canada

=== Asia ===
- Urban Construction College, a university college of Shenyang Jianzhu University in Shenyang, Liaoning, China
- University of Caloocan City, a public university in Caloocan, Philippines

=== Europe ===
- Ullswater Community College, a comprehensive school in Penrith, Cumbria, England
- University College Cardiff, previous name of Cardiff University in Cardiff, Wales
- University College Chichester, the previous name of University of Chichester in Chichester, England
- University College Cork, a constituent university of the National University of Ireland in Cork, Ireland
- Uppingham Community College, a secondary school in Uppingham, Rutland, England

== Other organizations ==
- Ukrainian Canadian Congress, umbrella organization of numerous associations of the Ukrainian community in Canada
- UCC GAA, a football and hurling club associated with University College Cork, Ireland
- UCC Holding, a Qatari company
- Union Carbide Corporation, a chemical company
- UCC Ueshima Coffee Co., a Japanese coffee and beverage manufacturing company
- Uganda Communications Commission, the regulator of the communications industry in Uganda
- University College Cork R.F.C., a rugby union club
- University Computing Company, the former name of Uccel
- University Cottage Club, an eating club of Princeton University
- Universities’ Computer Center, Thamaing College Campus, Rangoon, has the inaugural computer system in Burma

== Other ==
- Undepreciated capital cost, an account containing the original value of different classes of assets minus the accrued Capital Cost Allowance for Canadian tax purposes
- Unified combatant command, a United States joint military command
- Urban Cookie Collective, a British techno and house band
- Urgent care clinic, category of walk-in clinic focused on the delivery of ambulatory care in a dedicated medical facility outside of a traditional emergency room.
- Yucca Airstrip (IATA: UCC, ICAO: KUCC FAA LID: NV11)
