= Monster Bomber =

2006 video game

- Developer: Taito
- Publishers: JP: Taito; NA: Majesco; EU: 505 Games; AU: Red Ant Enterprises
- Platform: Nintendo DS
- Release: JP: March 23, 2006; NA: November 28, 2006; EU: May 5, 2007; AU: September 30, 2007
- Genre: Puzzle
- Mode: Single-player

Monster Bomber (モンスターボンバー, Monsutā Bonbā) is a puzzle video game developed by Taito for Nintendo DS in 2006-2007.

== Reception ==
Reception

Aggregate score
Aggregator	Score
Metacritic	55/100

Review scores
Publication	Score
Eurogamer	4/10
Famitsu	25/40
GameSpot	6.9/10
GameSpy	2.5/5
IGN	4.5/10
NGamer	58%
Retro Gamer	46%

The game received "mixed" reviews according to the review aggregation website Metacritic. In Japan, Famitsu gave it a score of one eight, one six, one five, and one six for a total of 25 out of 40.
