= Evangelion: 1.0 You Are (Not) Alone =

2007 Japanese animated film

Evangelion: 1.0 You Are (Not) Alone.
- Theatrical release poster

Japanese name
- Kanji: ヱヴァンゲリヲン新劇場版: 序
- Literal meaning: Evangelion New Theatrical Edition: Prelude
Transcriptions
- Revised Hepburn: Evangerion Shin Gekijō-ban: Jo
- Directed by: Hideaki Anno; Masayuki; Kazuya Tsurumaki
- Screenplay by: Hideaki Anno
- Based on: Neon Genesis Evangelion by Hideaki Anno
- Starring: Megumi Ogata; Megumi Hayashibara; Kotono Mitsuishi; Yuriko Yamaguchi; Fumihiko Tachiki; Motomu Kiyokawa
- Cinematography: Toru Fukushi
- Edited by: Hiroshi Okuda
- Music by: Shirō Sagisu
- Production company: Studio Khara
- Distributed by: The KlockWorx; Khara, Inc.
- Release date: September 1, 2007
- Running time: 98 minutes
- Country: Japan
- Language: Japanese
- Box office: $20 million

Evangelion: 1.0 You Are (Not) Alone. (Japanese: ヱヴァンゲリヲン新劇場版: 序, Hepburn: Evangerion Shin Gekijō-ban: Jo; lit. "Evangelion New Theatrical Edition: Prelude") is a 2007 Japanese animated science fiction action film, written and chiefly directed by Hideaki Anno. It is the first installment of the Rebuild of Evangelion tetralogy, based on the anime television series Neon Genesis Evangelion. The story, which is set in the futuristic city of Tokyo-3 fifteen years after a planetary catastrophe known as the Second Impact, focuses on Shinji Ikari, a boy who is recruited by the special agency Nerv to pilot a giant mecha known as an Eva unit and fight, along with fellow pilot Rei Ayanami, against a mysterious species named Angels. The film features the same cast of voice actors from the original series, including Megumi Ogata as Shinji, Megumi Hayashibara as Rei, and Kotono Mitsuishi as Misato Katsuragi.

Evangelion: 1.0 was planned to be the first installment of a three-part remake of Neon Genesis Evangelion with about one hundred fifty new cuts; during the production, however, the staff could not reuse the original drawings from the series and had to begin production from scratch. As production went on, the project began to deviate from the original series, introducing differences in plot and characterization. Hideaki Anno was joined in the direction by Kazuya Tsurumaki and Masayuki, both of whom were assistant directors of the original series. The storyboards were handled by Shinji Higuchi and Tomoki Kyoda.

The film, which retraces the plot of the first six episodes of the series, enjoyed a positive reception in Japan, grossing about ¥2 billion and generating considerable revenue for the home video market. Abroad, Evangelion: 1.0 received a more polarized reception, although generally positive; critics described it as too derivative of the classic series and claimed that it cut important details, while others praised its direction, soundtrack, and plot, with particular attention to its use of CGI graphics. The feature film also won accolades, receiving awards at, among others, the Animation Kobe and Tokyo International Anime Fair.

== Plot ==
Fifteen years after a global cataclysm known as the Second Impact, fourteen-year-old Shinji Ikari is summoned to Tokyo-3 by his estranged father Gendo, the commander of the paramilitary organization Nerv. Shinji gets caught in the crossfire between UN forces and a mysterious being called an Angel, but is rescued by Captain Misato Katsuragi, who brings him to Nerv headquarters. There, Gendo demands Shinji pilot Evangelion Unit 01, a giant, humanoid bio-machine, against the Angel. Shinji concedes when Gendo has Rei Ayanami, a wounded Evangelion pilot, prepared to be sent out instead. Shinji loses consciousness during the fight due to injuries inflicted by the Angel on Unit 01, as Evangelion units sympathetically reflect the pain of injuries they sustain onto their pilots. Unit 01 autonomously reactivates and wins the fight, destroying the Angel. After the battle, Misato becomes Shinji's guardian and he is enrolled in a local junior high school.

When another Angel arrives, Shinji's classmates Toji Suzuhara and Kensuke Aida sneak out of their emergency shelter to watch the battle, but the Angel throws Unit 01 onto a mountainside, nearly crushing them. Misato has the two take cover in Unit 01's cockpit and orders Shinji to retreat, but he ignores the orders and destroys the enemy with Unit 01's knife. After Misato scolds him for insubordination, Shinji wanders off and is recovered by Nerv agents before being brought back to her.

The Sixth Angel appears, but when Shinji is sent out to attack it in Unit 01, the Angel fires a powerful laser, critically injuring him, before beginning to drill into Tokyo-3 to reach Nerv headquarters. He wakes up from a coma several hours later, and Rei tells him that she will take his place for the operation to stop the Angel, and leaves to do it alone. Misato shows Shinji what the Angels are trying to reach: a white anthropomorphic giant kept at the bottom of Nerv headquarters, the Second Angel, Lilith, which, upon contact with one of the attacking Angels, will result in the deaths of all life on Earth.

Shinji agrees to pilot Unit 01 alongside Rei in Unit 00, wielding an experimental positron cannon, which requires the entire electrical power output of Japan to power, like a sniper rifle, and successfully destroys the Angel. Rei is nearly killed defending Shinji from the Angel's return fire, but he saves her by cooling Unit 00 in water and prying open its cockpit using Unit 01's knife. Rei, normally cold and emotionless, shares a smile with him.

On the surface of the Moon, a boy named Kaworu Nagisa awakens from one of nine coffin-like containers arranged on the ground. In a pit in front of him, surrounded by construction equipment and scaffolding, is an unidentified giant wearing a purple seven-eyed mask and wrapped in white bandages. A black monolith appears through which he and Seele 01 engage in a cryptic conversation. Looking towards Earth, Kaworu says that "the third one" has not changed and that he looks forward to meeting Shinji.

== Voice cast ==
Character	Japanese	English	
Character	Japanese	Funimation/Okratron 5000 (2009)	Dubbing Brothers/Prime Video (2021)
Shinji Ikari (碇 シンジ, Ikari Shinji)	Megumi Ogata	Spike Spencer	Spike Spencer
Misato Katsuragi (葛城 ミサト, Katsuragi Misato)	Kotono Mitsuishi	Allison Keith	Allison Keith
Gendo Ikari (碇 ゲンドウ, Ikari Gendō)	Fumihiko Tachiki	John Swasey	John Swasey
Rei Ayanami (綾波 レイ, Ayanami Rei)	Megumi Hayashibara	Brina Palencia	Amanda Winn-Lee
Ritsuko Akagi (赤木 リツコ, Akagi Ritsuko)	Yuriko Yamaguchi	Colleen Clinkenbeard	Mary Faber
Kaworu Nagisa (渚 カヲル, Nagisa Kaoru)	Akira Ishida	Jerry Jewell	Daman Mills
Kozo Fuyutsuki (冬月 コウゾウ, Fuyutsuki Kōzō)	Motomu Kiyokawa	Kent Williams	Michael Ross
Maya Ibuki (伊吹 マヤ, Ibuki Maya)	Miki Nagasawa	Caitlin Glass	Amy Seeley
Shigeru Aoba (青葉 シゲル, Aoba Shigeru)	Takehito Koyasu	Phil Parsons	Jaxon Lee
Makoto Hyuga (日向 マコト, Hyūga Makoto)	Hiro Yuuki	Mike McFarland	Joe Fria
Toji Suzuhara (鈴原 トウジ, Suzuhara Tōji)	Tomokazu Seki	Justin Cook	Brett Weaver
Kensuke Aida (相田 ケンスケ, Aida Kensuke)	Tetsuya Iwanaga	Greg Ayres	Alejandro Saab
Hikari Horaki (洞木 ヒカリ, Horaki Hikari)	Junko Iwao	Leah Clark	Kimberly Yates
Keel Lorenz (キール・ローレンツ, Kīru Rōrentsu)	Mugihito	Bill Jenkins	Tom Booker
Yui Ikari (碇 ユイ, Ikari Yui)	Megumi Hayashibara	Stephanie Young	Amanda Winn-Lee

== Production ==
=== Pre-production ===
Many different desires are motivating us to create the new Evangelion film. The desire to portray my sincere feelings on film. The desire to share, with an audience, the embodiment of image, the diversity of expressions, and the detailed portrayal of emotions that animation offers. The desire to connect today's exhausted Japanese animation [industry] to the future. The desire to fight the continuing trend of stagnation in anime. The desire to support the strength of heart that exists in the world. ... "Eva is too old", we felt. However, over the past twelve years, there has been no anime newer than Eva.
Hideaki Anno

After his film Cutie Honey (2004), Neon Genesis Evangelion director Hideaki Anno began to plan another live-action project; however, a script for this film could not be drafted and the director decided to refocus on animation. Anno had planned to work on the Neon Genesis Evangelion franchise again since the release of the DVD box set of his series Nadia: The Secret of Blue Water. He officially began working on a Neon Genesis Evangelion-related project in November 2005, considering it a suitable franchise he could work on without rights issues or interference. Anno was inspired by the Gundam franchise, which had been created years before by Yoshiyuki Tomino and was still running through television series, video games, and comics. He gave himself the purpose of Gundamizing Evangelion, expanding the franchise, possibly with the contribution of new and young authors; initially having in mind a title in the wake of G Evangelion, he tried to create a work capable of completely overturning the entire concept of Evangelion, similar to what G Gundam did for Tomino's franchise. He believed that animation was at a standstill, perceiving the need to produce "a work that would appeal to middle and high school-aged men, who quickly grow away from anime", and raise the general level of animated productions. In children's animation, Anno found a wide range of content available, such as Hayao Miyazaki's and Studio Ghibli's films, but for the older age groups he only noted Gundam; as Tomino's franchise had reached popularity beyond the boundaries of the otaku fanbase, Anno set himself the goal of doing something similar.

Anno did not rely on Gainax, the studio that produced Evangelion ten years earlier, to make the film. He wanted to create something new and felt he could not do so at Gainax, thinking that the studio would make him stick to "the same framework and the same tracks". He also said that he intended to respect the spirit of the original series in this way: "Without looking back, without admiration for the circumstances, we aim to walk towards the future". Anno contacted King Records' Toshimichi Ōtsuki, producer of the Evangelion television series, and, after initial hesitations, he agreed to help produce the new project. Ōtsuki proposed the deal to different companies; however, according to him, there were not many studios willing to work on an Evangelion continuation. He found a number of candidate studios, but none decided to join the project. Although the movie End of Evangelion (1997) was produced by Gainax and Production I.G, Anno decided to hold all the legal rights to the Evangelion continuation project, saying the efforts of the staff of the original series were not adequately rewarded, and the creation of a new company would allow for a fairer distribution of profits. The introduction of Evangelion-branded pachinko machines into Japanese markets also helped the project, increasing DVD sales of Neon Genesis Evangelion. Munenori Ogasawara eventually suggested the creation of a new studio, and Anno agreed. The Khara Office was founded that year, quickly outgrowing its space along the Chūō rapid line. In 2006, after moving to a larger office in Nishi-Shinjuku that February, Khara was officially founded. This allowed new personnel who did not work on the original series to be hired for the new project. Anno would not resign from Gainax, however, until October 2007.

=== Development ===
Hideaki Anno was assisted in the direction of You Are (Not) Alone by Masayuki and Kazuya Tsurumaki, who were assistant directors on Neon Genesis Evangelion. At the beginning of production, Anno asked Tsurumaki what he would like to do after finishing Diebuster between working on an Evangelion-related project, or on a new project about a famous anime. While confused by the question, he instinctively answered Evangelion. If Tsurumaki had refused, Anno was prepared to offer the role of assistant director to someone else, but Tsurumaki eventually accepted, albeit with reservations. Tsurumaki had regrets about the sixth episode of Neon Genesis Evangelion, "Rei II", which after the storyboard "was ordered by another company, and Gainax had no control over it", and felt he could address the issues he had with the episode. Meanwhile, Ōtsuki contacted Masayuki in February 2006. Like with the theatrical release of 1997, Masayuki was originally working on just the layout and helping with animation; however, Khara quickly promoted him to assistant director, since Tsurumaki alone could not do all the work within the production schedule.

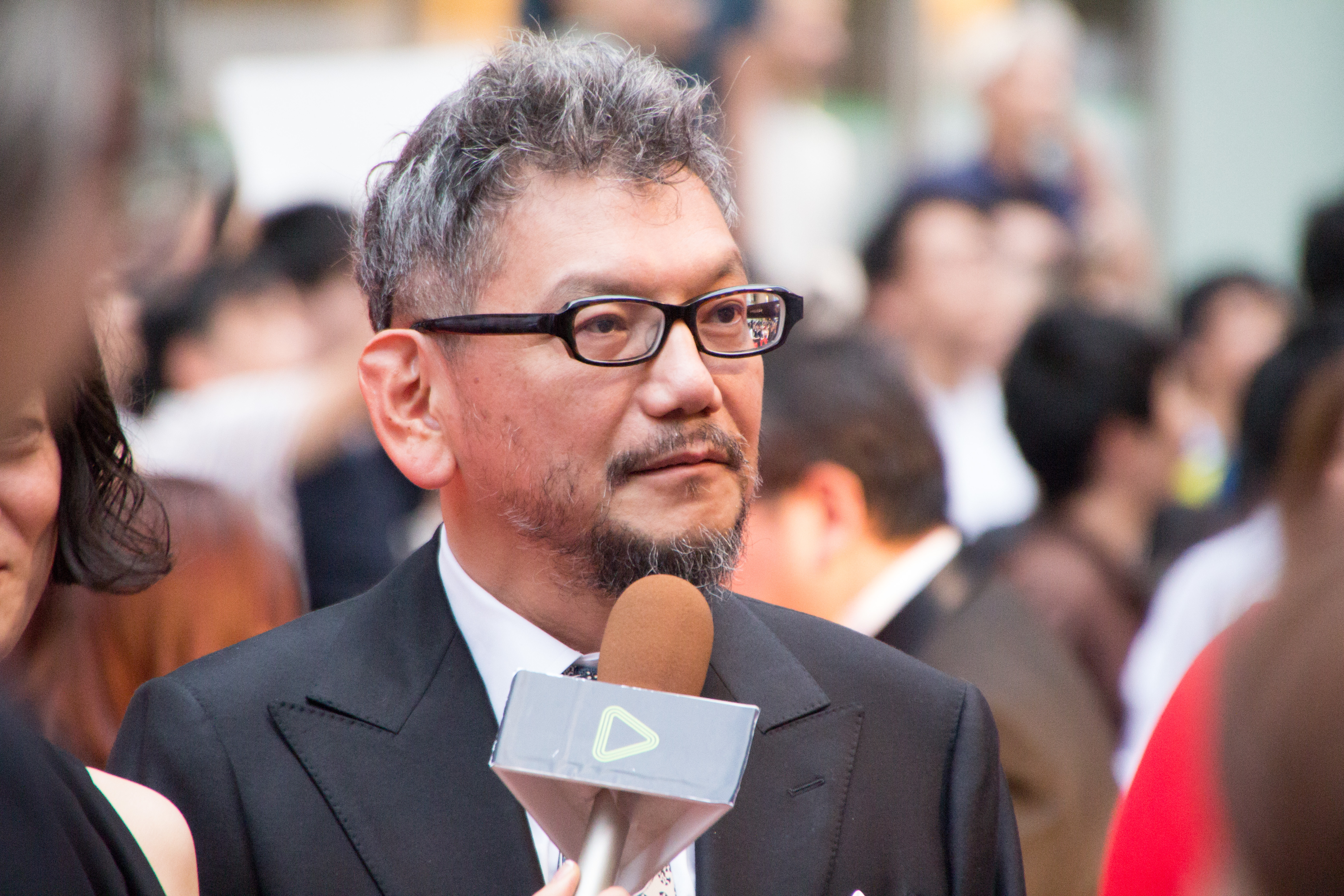
Hideaki Anno, director of both Neon Genesis Evangelion and You Are (Not) Alone

Anno originally planned a simple graphic remake of the series with the addition of about one hundred fifty cuts and the use of more advanced animation techniques. Tsurumaki claimed Anno's original plans were not to make a "pure sequel", but a "compilation that wasn't really a compilation", similarly to what Mobile Suit Gundam Seed did for the Gundam franchise. According to Tsurumaki, the director planned something similar to the forty-fifth episode of Mobile Suit Victory Gundam, a recap episode that reveals more about the plot, or like the fourteenth episode of Neon Genesis Evangelion, "Weaving a Story". The initial project also called for a film to be released every six months, though the films would be a quick, easily produced year-and-a-half time commitment. According to Tsurumaki, Anno himself probably had no intention of officially directing the film, instead completely outsourcing the project, and the plans changed only during the production of Evangelion: 1.0.

At the beginning of production, Hiroshi Haraguchi and other crew members began the process of banking, an operation consisting of recovering the sheets containing the original drawings from Evangelion. Because of the importance of the process, Haraguchi started early, before storyboards were even in place. Anno joined them midway through the process. The banking process was long and complex. At first, an attempt was made to simply convert the original film of the episodes to digital by doing tests at Imagica, a company specializing in film post-production. The film was converted from the original 16mm format to a full 35mm format; however, the images were of lower quality than expected, especially in terms of color and definition. Considering the low quality of the process, and the calculated costs of the entire procedure, Khara decided to start directly in digital and redo everything from scratch.

The initial idea of a simple remake was abandoned, and the project moved away from the track established by the series. The production became more frantic, undergoing crises and changes up to the last minute; moreover, production of Evangelion: 1.0 took place at the same time as the second film, Evangelion: 2.0 You Can (Not) Advance. In the final film, only a part of the drawings came from the banking process; a third of the first half and almost the entirety of the second half was made of new material. Tsurumaki made sure that everything went smoothly, since Anno's policy was to harmonize the new parts as much as possible with the old parts. Staff described the work for Evangelion: 1.0 as a live, flexible at best, and a disorganized performance at worst; Khara also did many things on the spot, and was frequently forced to redo aspects of the production due to sudden changes in schedule. Moreover, Tsurumaki claimed that even the slightest mistake could bring the production out of balance; as each department worked independently, it was hard to know if they were on the right track until the last moment. According to Haraguchi, the production had to be flexible so everything could be adjusted and changed during the process, given the constant thinking of the main staff. Even the title changed during the process; when Evangelion: 1.0 was announced, the film should have been titled Rebuild of Evangelion: 01.

=== Writing ===
Shinji Higuchi, who was an animator in the original anime, and Tomoki Kyoda joined Anno in the storyboarding process. Anno called Higuchi since it was established that the climax of the film would revolve around Operation Yashima, the battle against the Angel Ramiel at the center of the plot. During this time, Higuchi spoke with Kenji Kamiyama, director of Ghost in the Shell: Stand Alone Complex. During the production, Higuchi drew heavily from Kamiyama's work, inspired by the camera tricks and directorial style Kamiyama used in digital animation. Higuchi found difficulties in the writing process, in particular during scenes meant to evoke a sense of surprise, such as when Rei suddenly protects Shinji with her shield from an Angel. Meanwhile, Munenori Ogasawara called Kyoda, an old colleague, because of his work on Eureka Seven. At first, Kyoda wanted to refuse the proposal, but accepted the job after Anno spoke with him about the state of Japanese animation and what he considered to be its imbalances. Kyoda worked with no significant direction, instead of drawing off what he heard in his first meeting at Khara; when he saw the final storyboard corrected by Tsurumaki, however, the atmosphere of the film was completely different from what he had written.

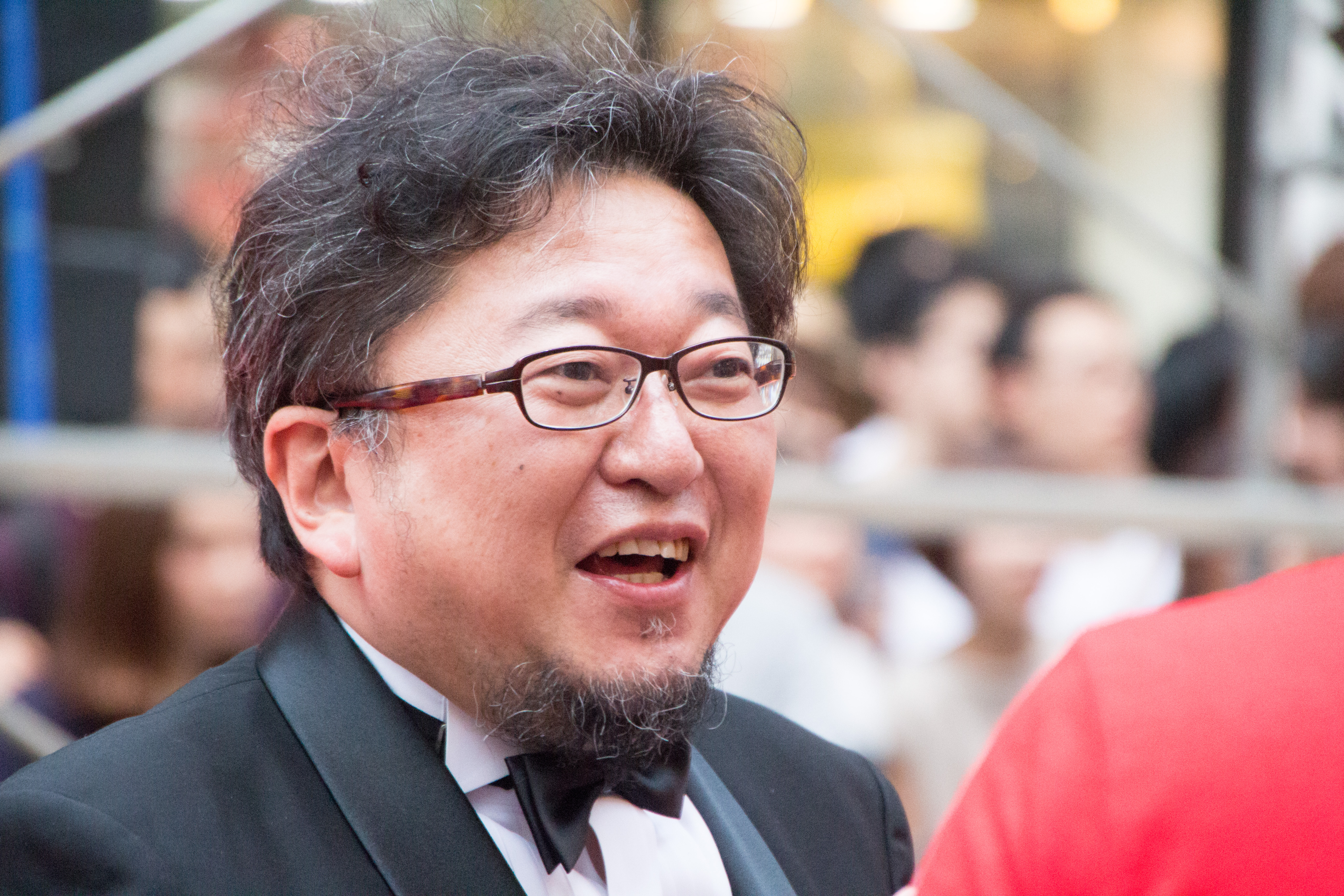
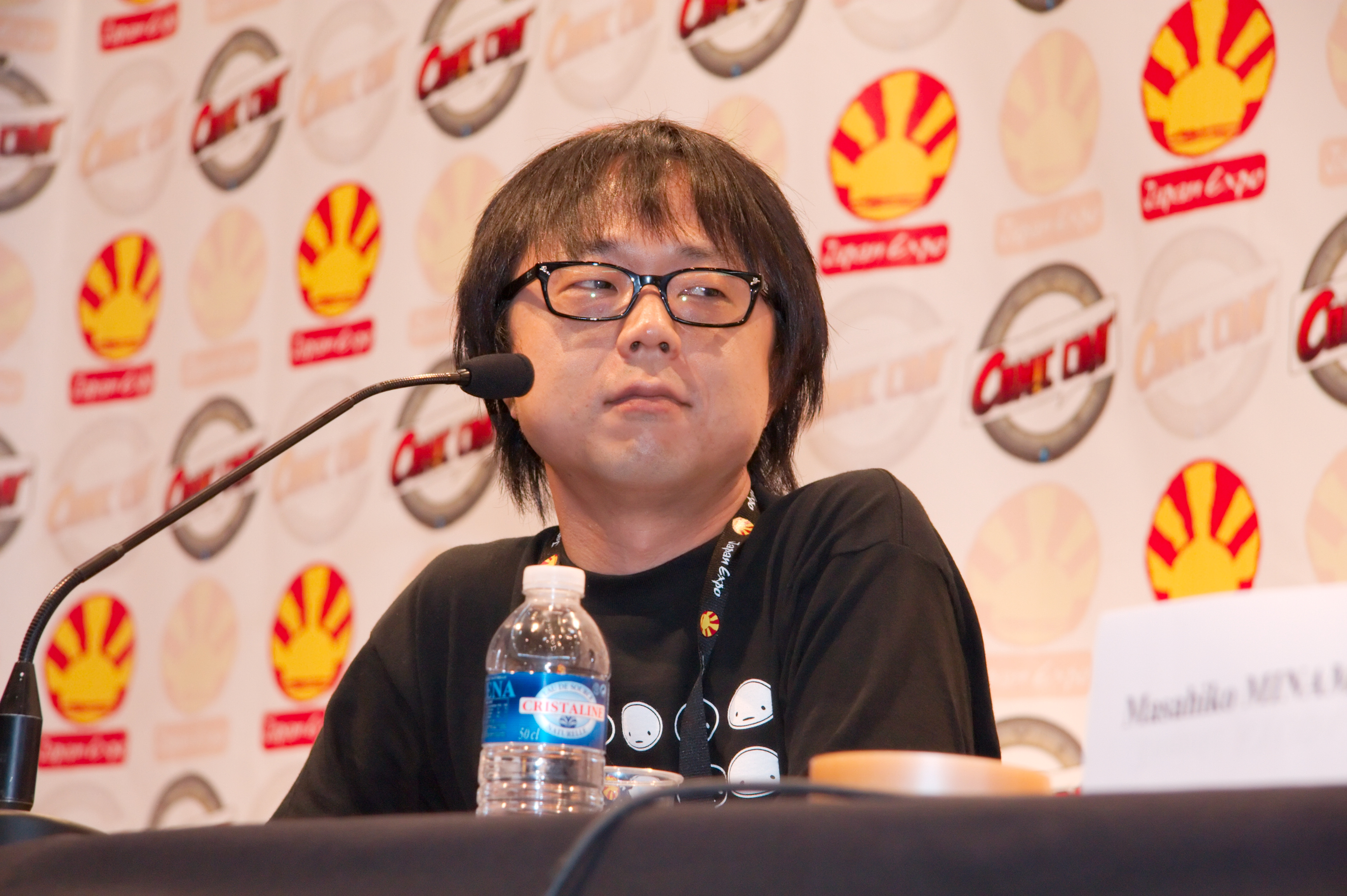
Shinji Higuchi and Tomoki Kyoda worked on the storyboard.

Although Evangelion: 1.0 is based on an extant, finished series, the storyboarding process went through several changes. Both Higuchi and Kyoda wrote storyboards that were initially much different from the television series, receiving complaints from the staff; the crew said the final result did not feel like Evangelion. Anno enjoyed Kyoda's work, but found it too far from the style of the original series, so he decided to take the best parts of Kyoda's storyboard and rewrite it again. For example, Kyoda proposed a scenario during Operation Yashima in which the Eva-00 and Eva-01 join forces to hit Ramiel, like Kyodai Ken Byclosser, but the result was found to be too unrealistic. Ultimately, the staff watched DVDs of Neon Genesis Evangelion to recover the spirit of the original series and not stray too far from the plot.

Tsurumaki initially set a length of ninety minutes, but in the storyboarding process the film was almost one hundred ten minutes, so cuts were made in the first rough editing phase. Tsurumaki also had problems understanding Higuchi's storyboards because the drawings were made spontaneously and because the notes added to the storyboards were too generic. He attempted to make the story more serious than Neon Genesis Evangelion, which was originally supposed to be a robotic version of Sailor Moon. As elements from this original vision could be seen in the episodes of the series which were centered in the film, Tsurumaki elected to not write those elements back in. It was particularly difficult to introduce elements of surprise, as Neon Genesis Evangelion: Death & Rebirth (1997) already served as a recap film of the series. Instead, he had to devise ways to make the audience understand that Evangelion: 1.0 and the Rebuild tetralogy set out to tell a different story. He and Anno also made it their goal to correctly represent Shinji and Misato's story, as well as Misato and Ritsuko's generation.

During the writing process, staff introduced more changes. For example, the Angels are not named; Masayuki stated that their names were excluded from the script because they simply were not used by the staff, which had a hard time remembering them. To Tsurumaki, Evangelion: 1.0 was a story of growth, so he painted in the storyboard a clear picture of Shinji's evolution, adding a happy ending to the story. However, Anno changed the plot again, adding nuance because he thought Tsurumaki's idea went too far. In its first half, Neon Genesis Evangelion maintained a normal mecha story setting and then became mature and serious in the second half; to balance this, Anno added an adult and serious tone by introducing mature conversations between Ritsuko and Misato during all parts of the tetralogy. The scene in which Shinji escapes and gets on a train, introduced in the fourth episode of the series, was initially cut from the script; however, Tsurumaki pushed to introduce it again to better represent Tokyo-3. Instead of the sequence in which Shinji meets his friend Kensuke Aida in the middle of the fields, also present in the fourth episode, a sequence in which Shinji wanders on a deserted highway at night was inserted, conceived by Kyoda.

=== Design and scenography ===
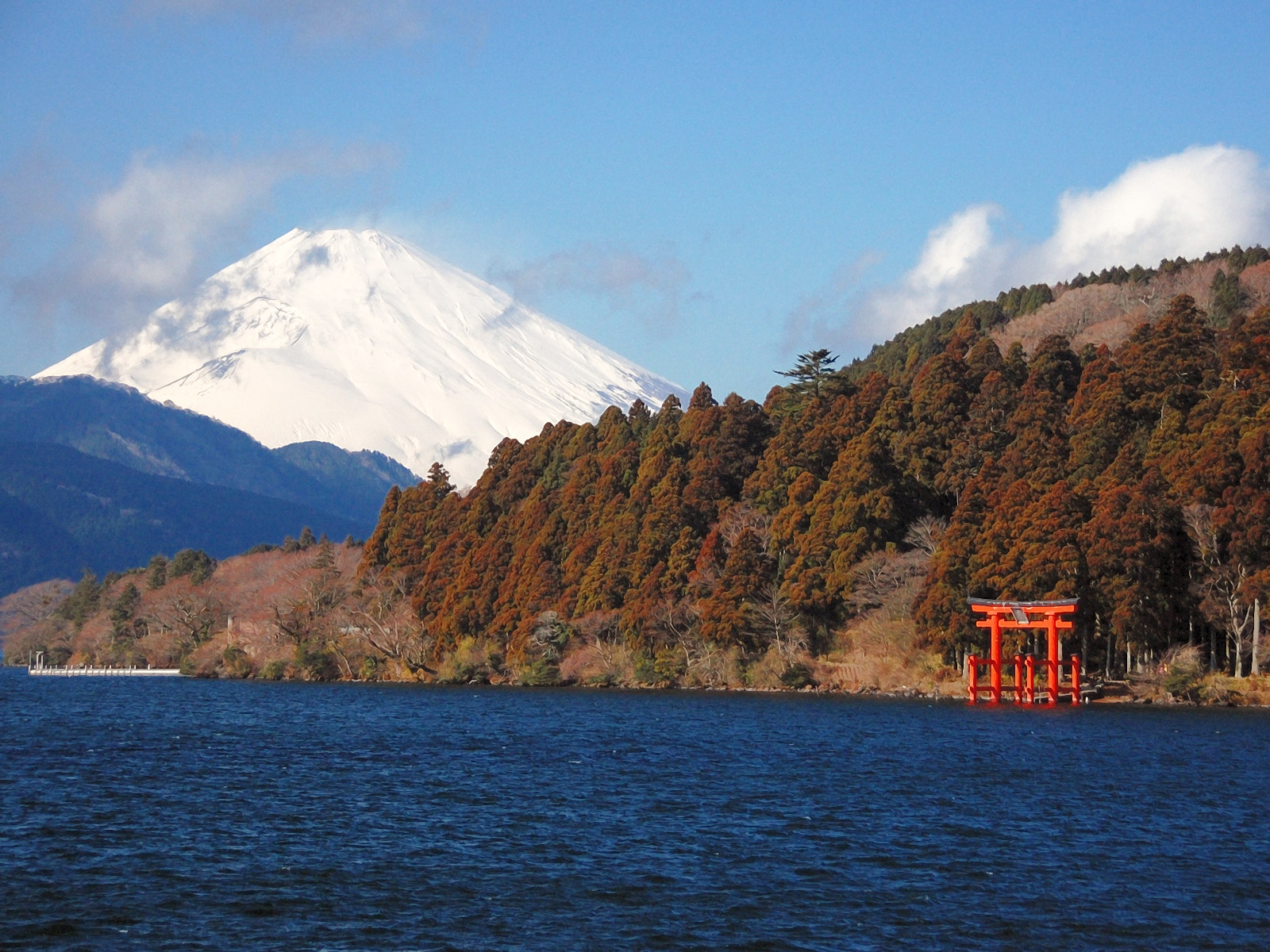
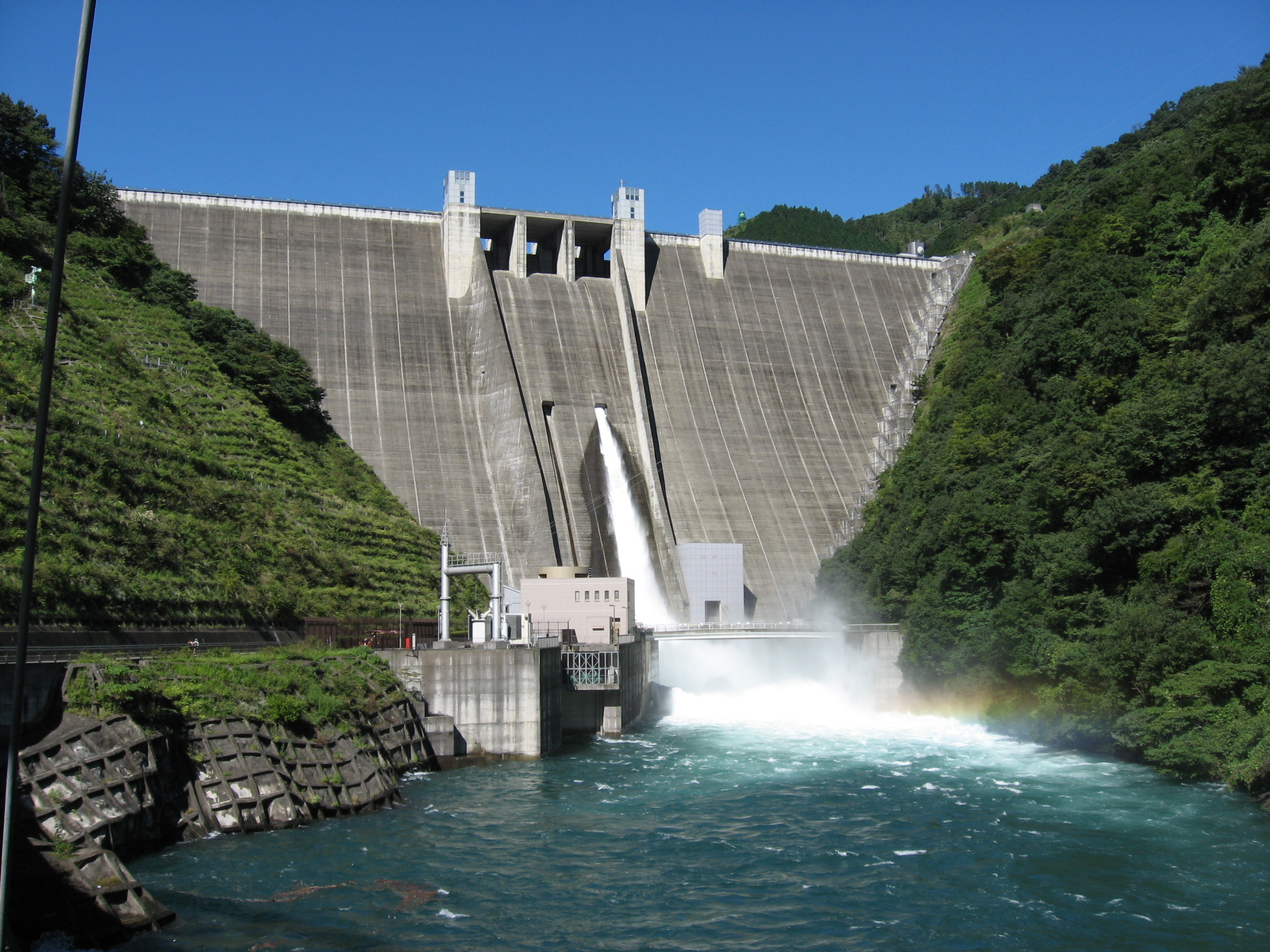
Khara personnel visited Lake Ashino in Hakone, the location of the fictitious Tokyo-3, and the Miyagase Dam, which inspired the interiors of the Nerv base.

Hiroshi Katō, who had previously worked on Evangelion, returned to work on the franchise as an art director in Evangelion: 1.0. Katō also worked as production designer alongside Tatsuya Kushida of Bishou Inc. According to Katō, ideas set aside during the production of the television series due to lack of time were revived for the film. Anno also had a particular eye on pylons, telephone poles, and traffic lights. Khara called in Takeshi Takakura for design work; when he joined the staff, the content or structure of the work had not yet been decided, and Anno and the others did not know who to assign what to at first. Takakura tried to recapture the spirit of the original product while maintaining the setting Anno wanted. During the production of Neon Genesis Evangelion, for example, the details of the Eva cage were eventually omitted due to lack of time and resources. He also participated in special excursions with the other staff members. In March, Takakura and the others visited Tepco's Keiyo power substation as well as the Miyagase Dam. The excursions proved particularly fruitful, as the dam featured a tunnel with a 45-degree slope and a walkway similar to a secret base, details that were later reflected in the Nerv base setting. Anno, a long-time railway enthusiast, also gave special attention to trains. Designer Nahohiro Washio drew the rough draft of the Eva transport train, and Takakura finished it with CG, improving the details. Kyoda also helped in the design process, conceiving the new Seele logo.

Yoshiyuki Sadamoto, the character designer of the original series, returned to his role for Evangelion: 1.0 and the other Rebuild films. At first, he tried to work on the character color specs by simply replacing those in the series with digital equivalents. However, Sadamoto felt the digital colors looked unnatural, and the skin colors tended towards orange. Anno gave particular importance to color, controlling it in every cut. The color was especially important in the case of information-dense layouts or layouts rich in mechanical elements. The director wanted to use flashy, dense colors without lowering the quality of the image, so he joined color designer Kazuko Kikuchi and worked tirelessly on color specifications. Kikuchi also had difficulties during the process; in the end, Khara decided to adjust the color scheme according to the character's personality, thinking long and hard about what to do and taking months to do it. Hidenori Matsubara designed the clothes of Misato, Ritsuko, the Nerv workers, and some details of the pilots' suits, taking inspiration in particular from some choices introduced in Sadamoto's manga. Haraguchi was also involved in the design choice, as the drawing style was a constant topic of discussion among the directors. In the end, the production opted for a style that was neither too realistic nor overly cartoony. In the original first episode, for example, Misato makes cartoonish expressions of surprise, which were eventually removed from the film. Tokyo-3 city was portrayed as a fictional half-uninhabited capital in the original series due to the large amount of work required to animate the background characters, while Nerv workers and random inhabitants were drawn for the film.

Ikuto Yamashita returned to work on mecha design. He decided not to change the mecha designs too much: the Positron Rifle and Unit-01, for example, kept the same pose and position even in the Rebuild. The artist also resumed some ideas discarded during the production of the series, published at the time in an artbook named Sore o Nasumono. During the production of Evangelion, Yamashita designed the Eva units with completely dark livery, simple orange and green luminescent inserts shining through the darkness. For the Rebuild, he was able to recover the original idea from twelve years earlier and added the luminous inserts to Eva-01. Anno was particularly inspired by Ultraman and the Shocker members from Kamen Rider. He wanted to replicate the sense of fear communicated by tokusatsu products, where dark giants would suddenly find themselves in bloody night battles, with the only thing visually emerging from the darkness were their frightening glowing eyes. Anno himself helped with the design of the Eva simulator visible during Shinji's training, which Higuchi compared to the God Warrior from Nausicaä of the Valley of the Wind (1984) and the Destroid Monster from Superdimensional Fortress Macross, two productions that Anno had participated in. Takeshi Honda was called to Khara while he was working on another production. He was in charge of the design of the Eva units, the Positron Rifle, and other mechanical equipment; he also wanted to work on special effects, but due to lack of time he left the task to others. Honda also did not make original drawings, limiting himself mostly to correcting those that already existed. At first, he thought to give the Eva units a thin body, but to give a sense of heaviness and meet the needs of the director he thickened the humanoids. He also had regrets about the television series: given the limited resources, Honda had to limit the lines used in the mecha design on Evangelion. For the Rebuild, he was able to draw all the mechanical details properly. The artist also changed the proportions of the mechas, while not changing anything substantial in terms of performance. He received no special requests from Anno, feeling freedom in the process.

Selected film locations

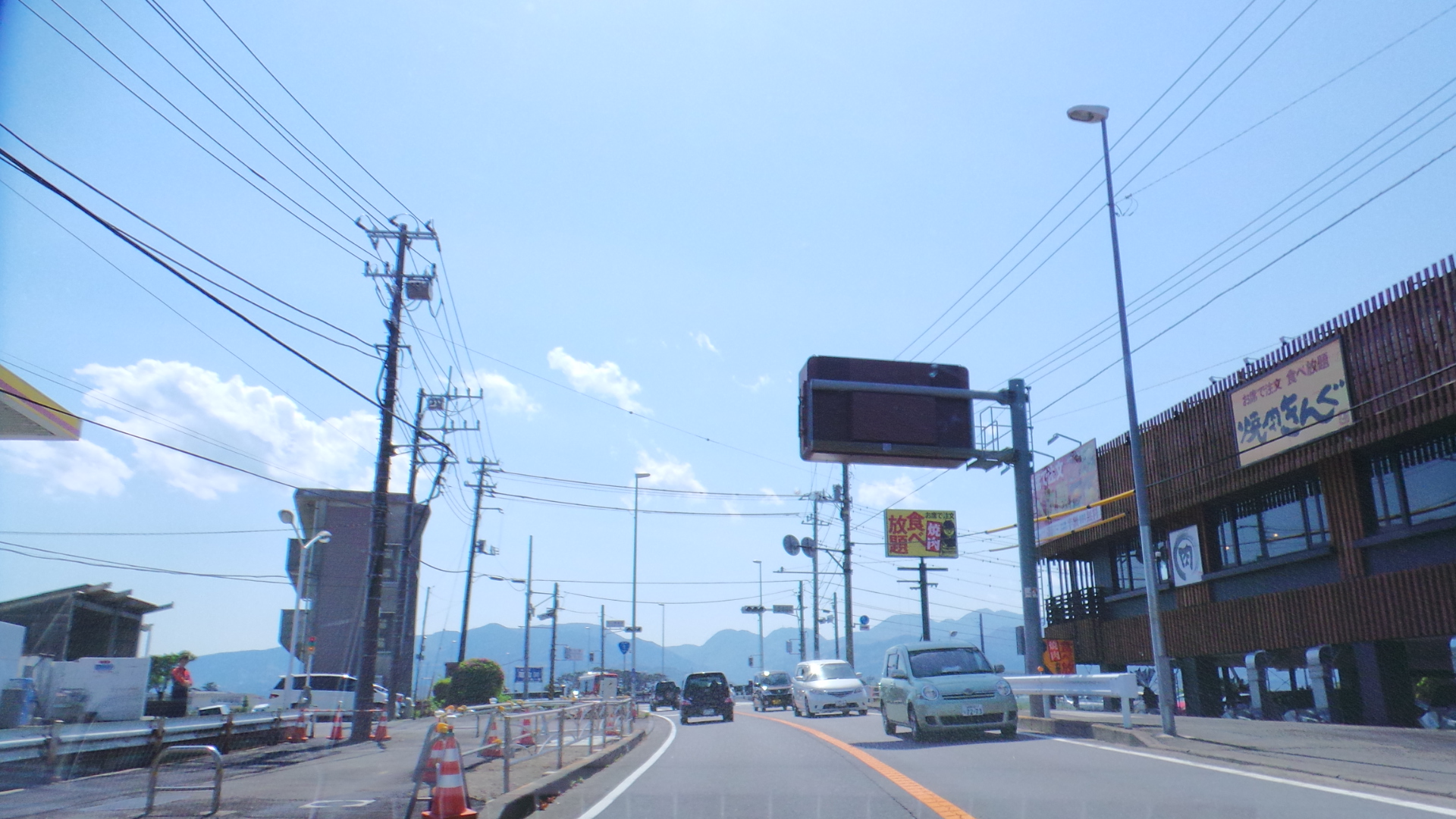
City of Odawara, where the angel Sachiel first appears

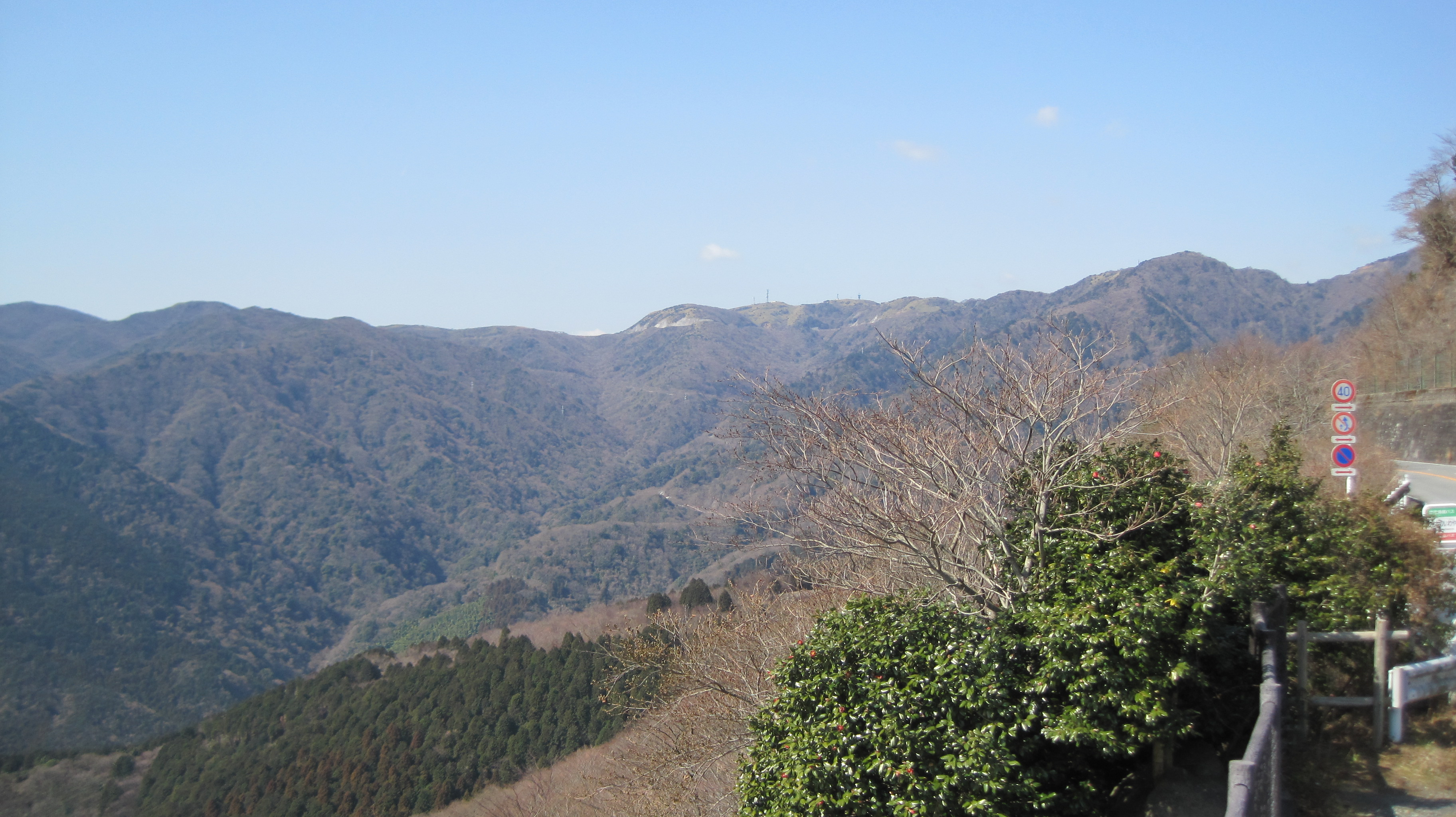
Panorama of the Daikanzan area, near Hakone, where Shamshiel is intercepted

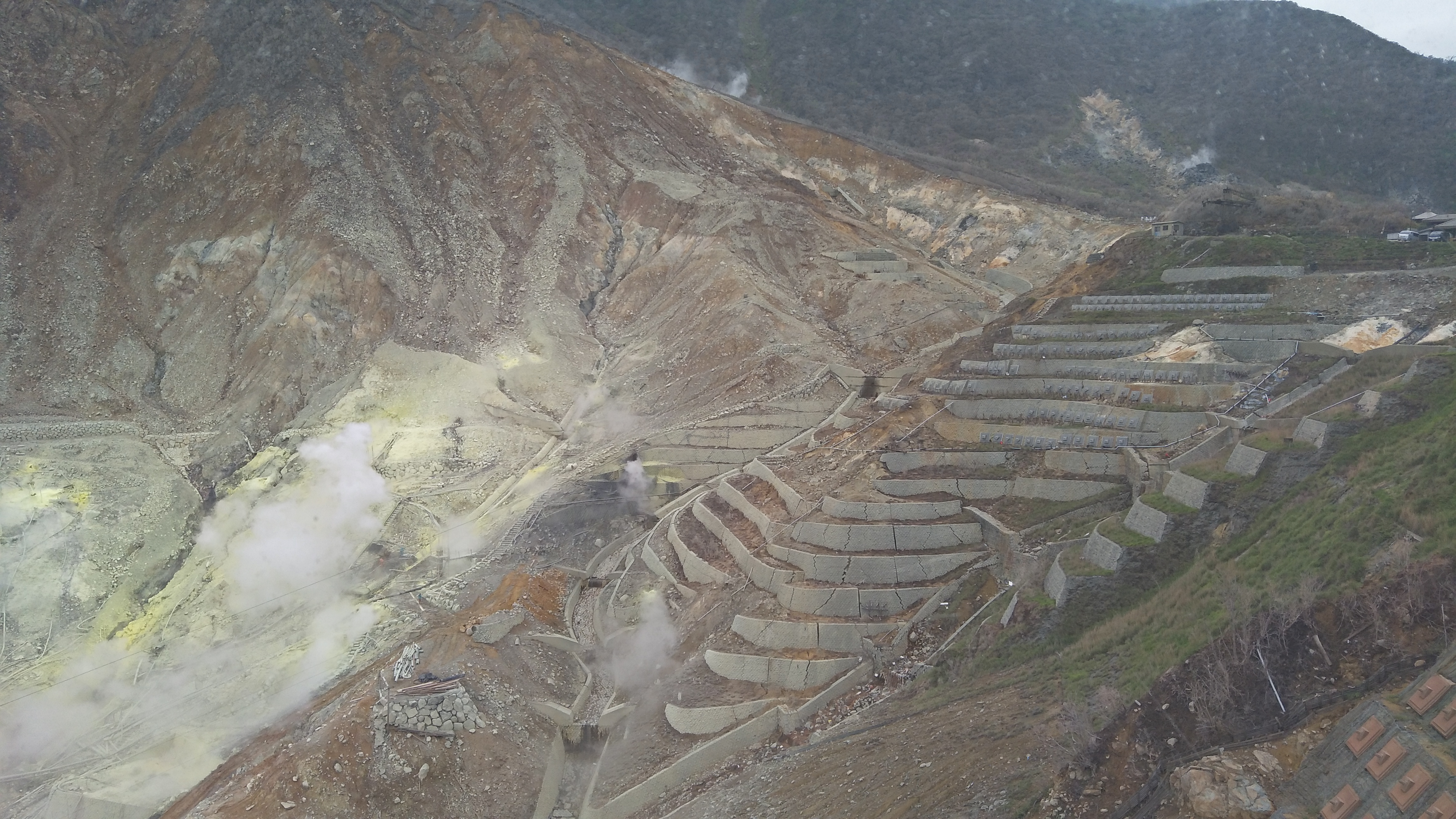
The Ōwakudani, where Shinji goes after escaping from the Nerv

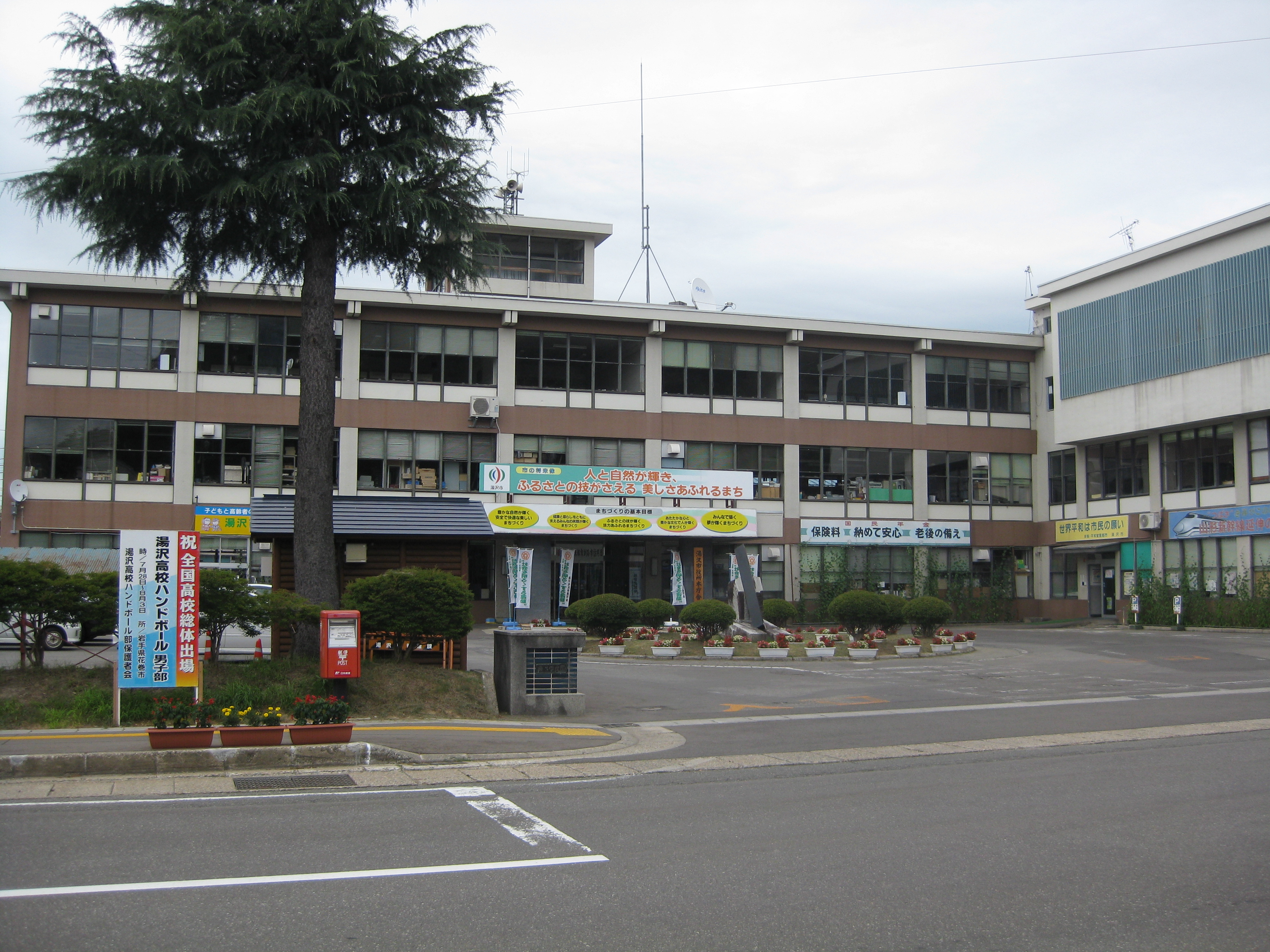
Yukawa, visible during preparations for Operation Yashima

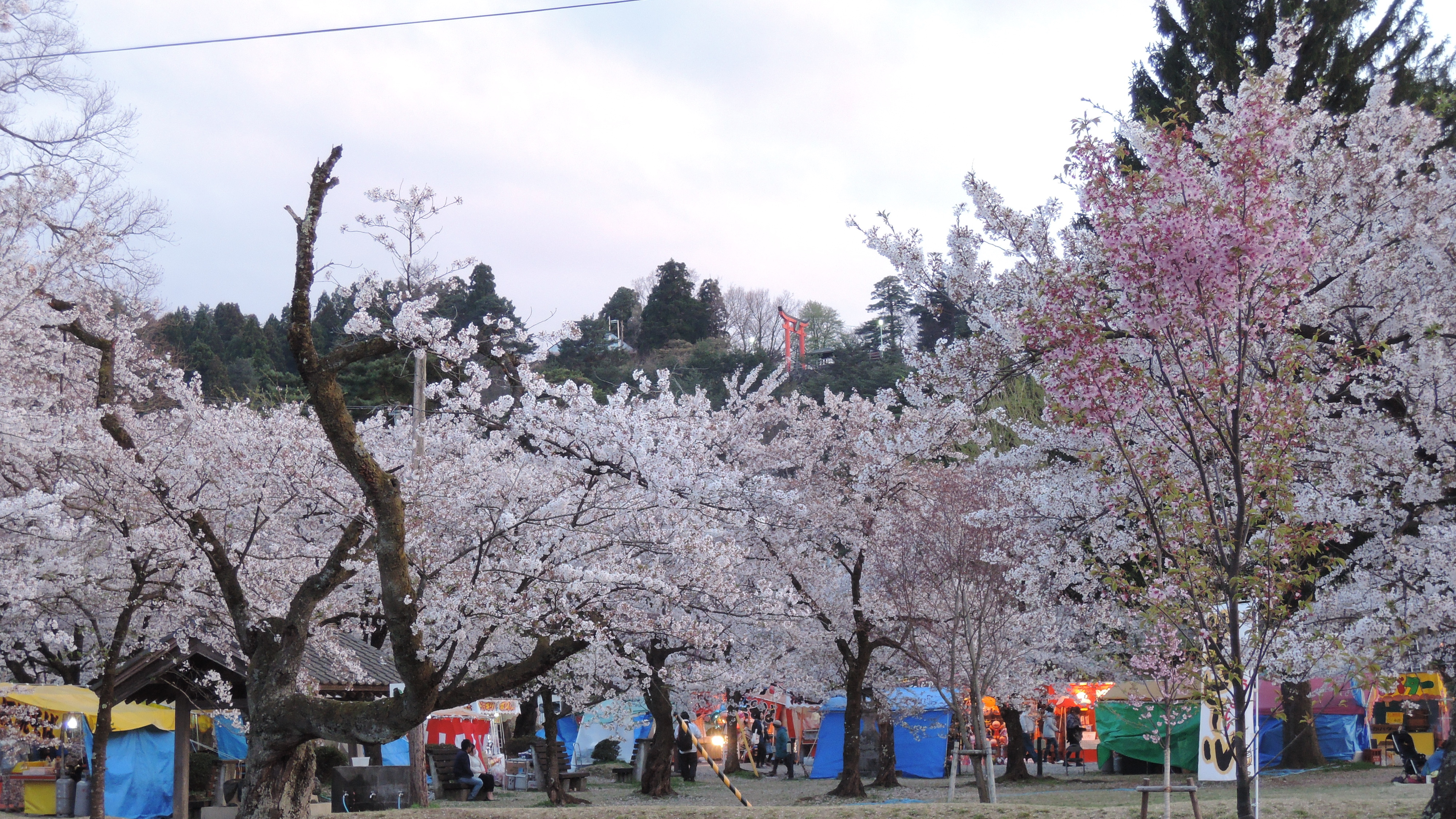
Maramatsu, also visible during preparations for the Operation

=== Animation ===
After the banking process, backgrounds and sets were completely recreated, and the drawings were redone from scratch trying to maintain the basic atmosphere. The team could not use the old backgrounds from the series, as although they managed to recover about half the material, after twelve years in storage much was physically deteriorated and unusable. The backgrounds were still important for the animators for reference, as in some scenes the color palette used in Neon Genesis Evangelion was recreated to evoke a sense of nostalgia. In other scenes, they simply copied the backgrounds over, increasing detail to an amount that was not possible with old technology. In the first scene of the film, for example, more weeds were added to the backgrounds while still maintaining the same impression. Anno also gave the animators the goal of evoking the idea of a live-action film with special effects. Shunji Suzuki, who had already been the animation director for the first episode of the series, was called to supervise the key animations, or key frames. He was also in charge of correcting the animation layout, with Yuji Moriyama and Kazuchika Kise eventually joining him as supervisors. Suzuki tried to give a sense of unity to the animation, as different parts of the film were worked on simultaneously by different directors. The overall workload increased exponentially during the process, and he found himself struggling in a state of chaos, always working on three or four things at once.

Sadamoto helped with animation, mainly for Kaworu's last scene on the Moon, while Hidenori Matsubara was chosen as the animation director for the second part of the film. At first, when the project's vision was to remake the anime with one hundred fifty new cuts, they only asked Matsubara to help with the new designs, but during production he asked to work on only the new drawings so as to not ruin the original atmosphere of the show. Matsubara also helped in the first part and the layouts. Anno also did not ask him for anything in particular, as there was no clear idea of what to do, and no rigid titles or defined agreements were assigned within the creative staff.

Tatsuya Takana, on the other hand, specialized in poles. Anno explicitly requested that they, along with distributors and payphones, be treated for all intents and purposes as characters. The director took photos of poles to be depicted in the film, which were combined into a layout by Ikki Todoroki, then drawn in clean lines so that the finishers could paint them. The pylons were primarily drawn in 3D, but Tanaka added the wires, going so far as to draw almost every pole in the film. He also drew the Shōnan-Shinjuku line at the beginning of the film, details in the layout, and fighter planes drawn by Anno. He initially proposed using 3D for the poles, outlining them directly from photographs to save money, but the production preferred to do otherwise. Takana also designed most of the traffic lights, conceiving the design himself. The reference photos he had were not entirely clear, so he integrated the parts that were not visible, working and making changes until the last minute. Even the poles and buildings were drawn in celluloid. Anno paid special attention to the colors, working with the color designer, Kikuchi, step by step. Anno worked with him on the train cuts, checking the smallest details every time. Sometimes he and Anno spent more than half an hour on a cut of a few frames, and, thanks to the benefits of digital technology, Kikuchi was able to change the color with ease.

The Angels were partly made in 3D CGI and partly hand-drawn, as in the case of Shamshiel's whips. Other sequences, such as the one in which the Eva units are transported by trains, required precision in the movements and were instead made in 3D. Other staff members also intervened in the process. Honda was responsible for the cut in which the Eva-01 is framed seizing the Positron Rifle, and had trouble drawing it. The framing was eventually done by hand; according to Honda 3D would have been boring, while hand-drawing, by nature less accurate, allowed to give "some unexpected false information". The Gatling gun was made by Kazuchika Kise; Tomoko Masuda, on the other hand, was assigned to oversee the 2D digital work. Masuda, who had previously been in charge of matte painting the live-action films and had worked with Higuchi on Sinking of Japan (2006), was tasked with producing the logos and legible lettering on signs, drinks and other visible objects in the film; he produced imaginary company logos mixed with some existing ones, along with barcodes and car license plates. He used Adobe Illustrator for outlining and output, then used Photoshop and After Effects for corrections in the process. At the end of July 2006, during the final stages of production, the staff observed and corrected any errors in the animations, with whoever pointed out the error then having to take responsibility, fixing the wrong drawings themselves. The work of the digital department was delivered at the end, after everyone else had finished.

Selected mechanical vehicles represented in the film

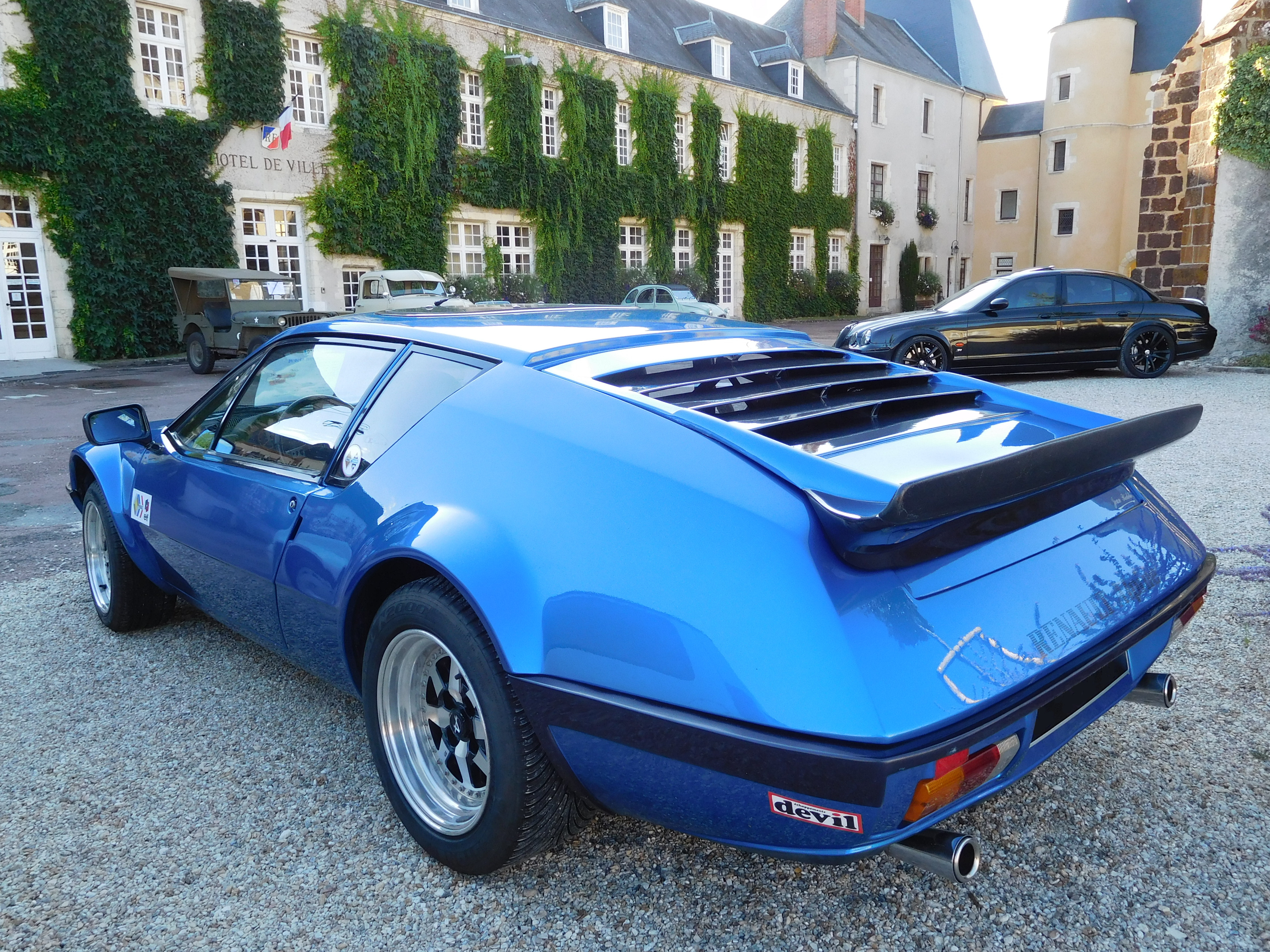
A Renault Alpine A310, a type of car owned by Misato Katsuragi

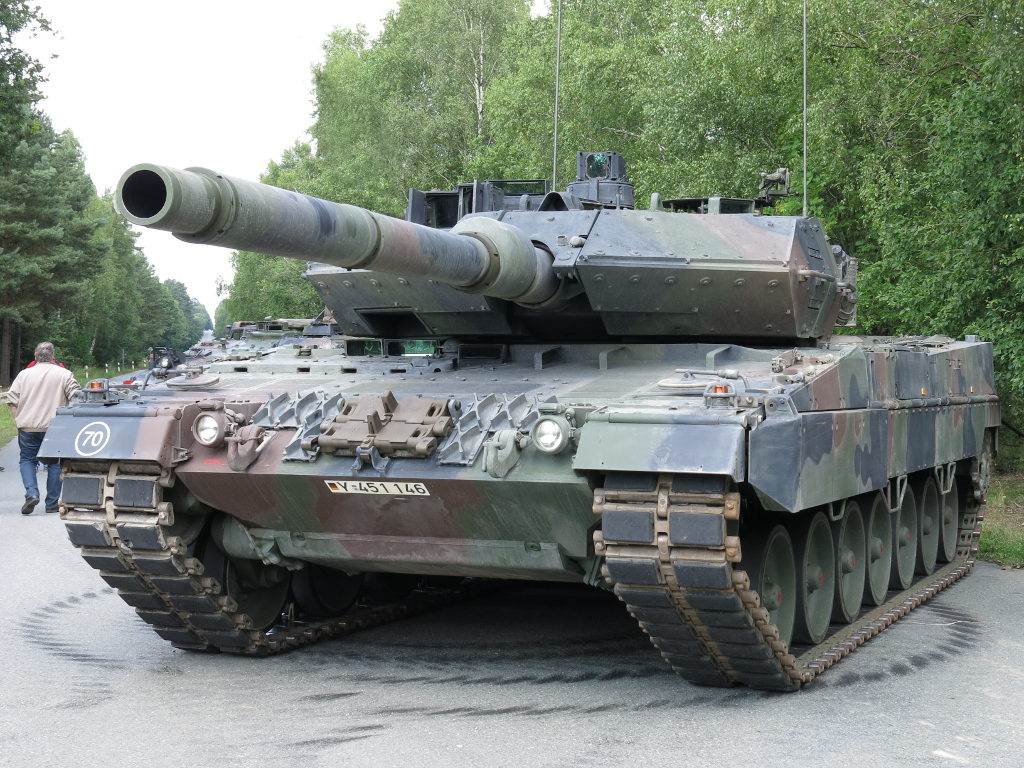
A Leopard 2 A7, a type of tank used in the Sachiel attack sequence

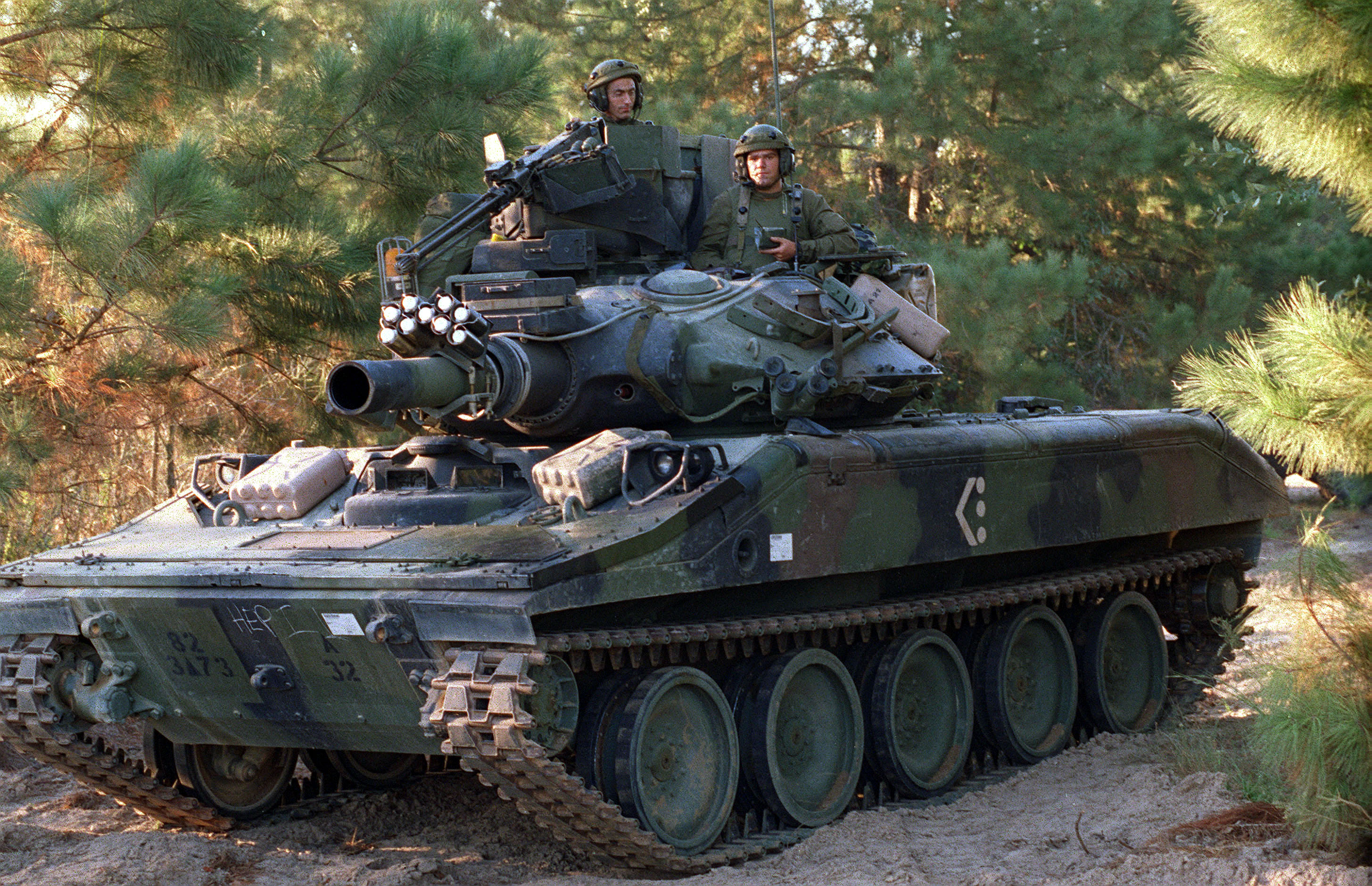
A M551, a tank similar to those used in the Sachiel attack sequence

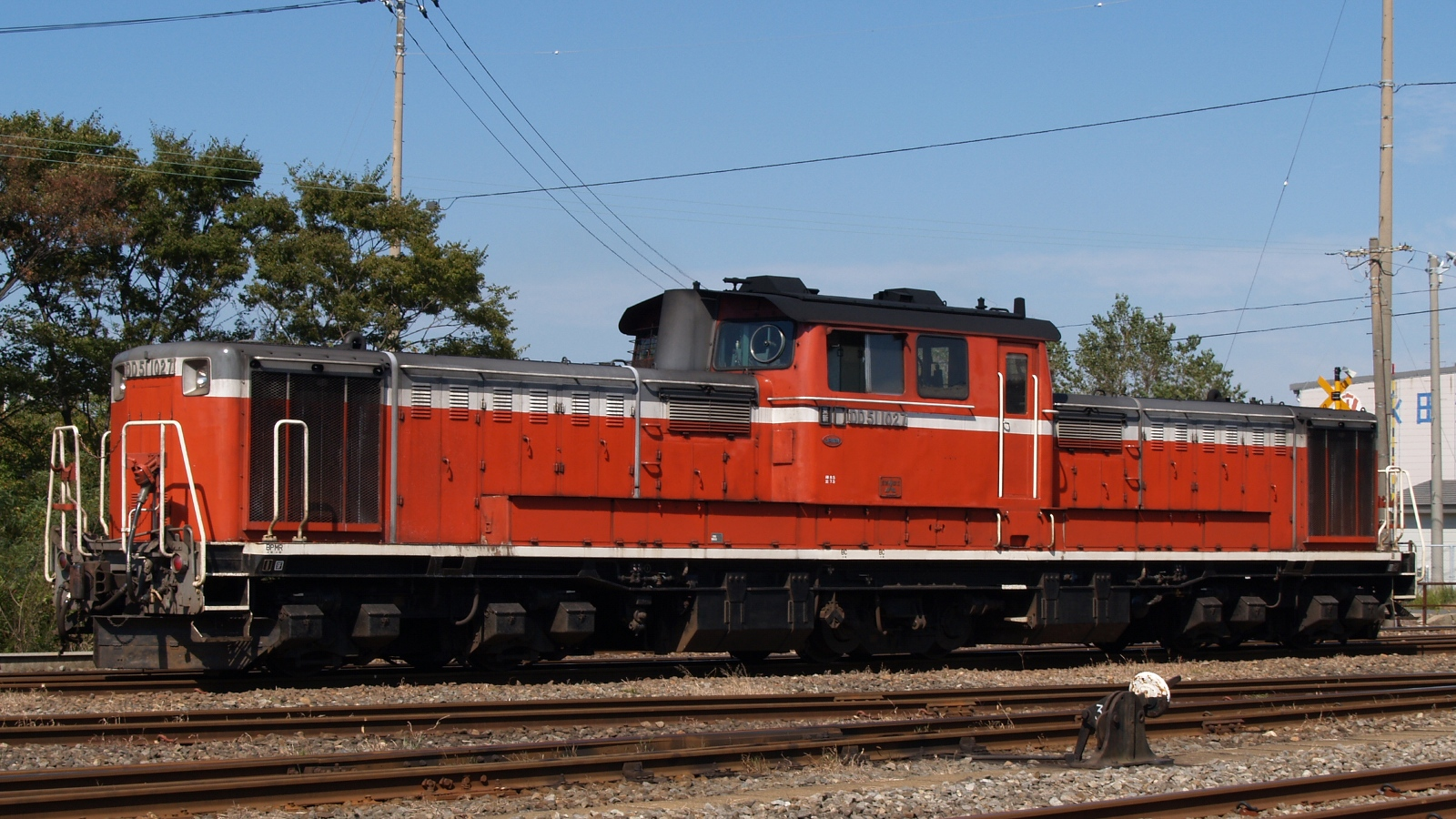
A Diesel DD51 train car used during Operation Yashima

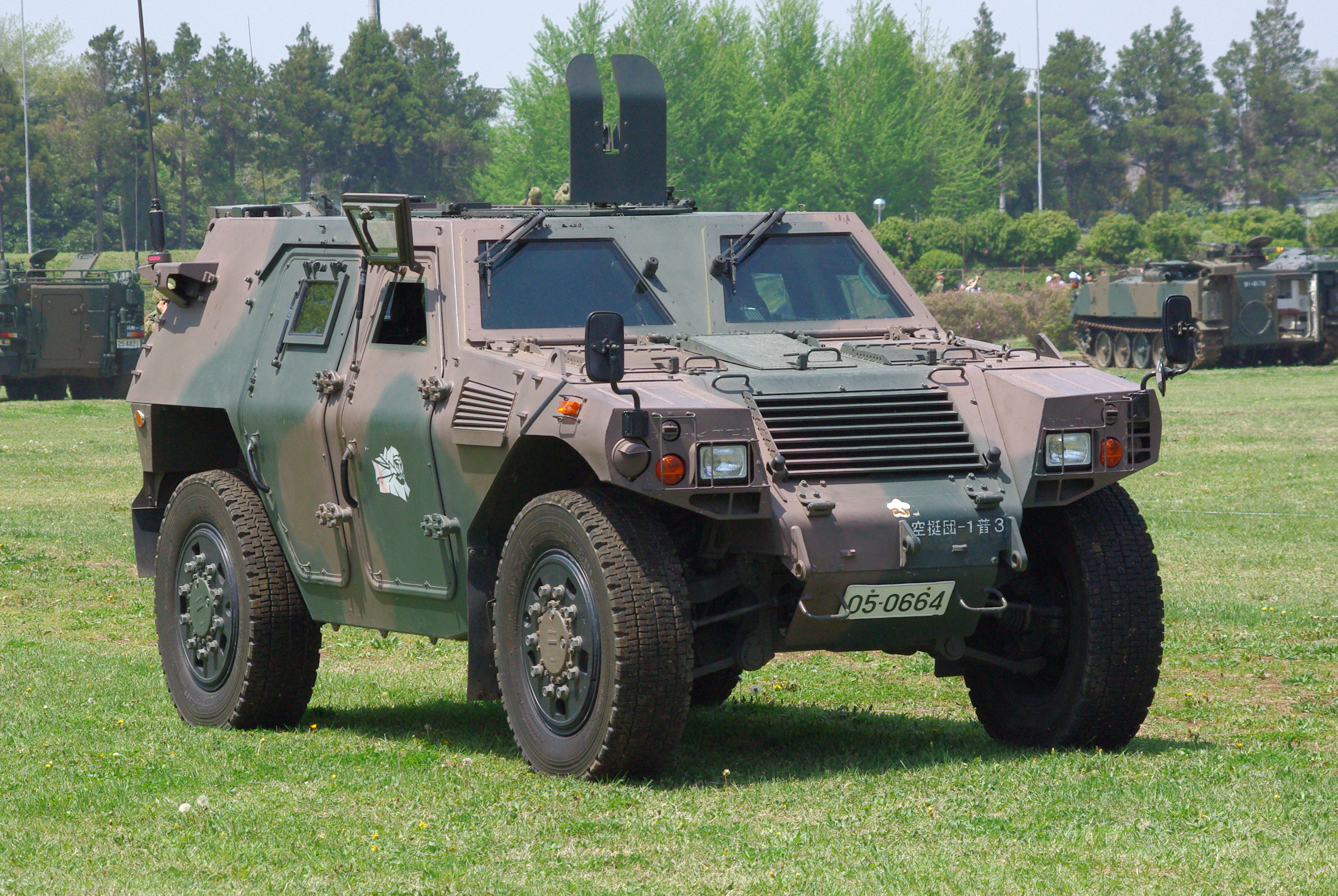
A Light Armoured Vehicle similar to those visible during Operation Yashima

=== CGI ===
Anno stated that he was not a CGI technology expert, did not know how to use Photoshop well, and had an unpleasant experience with digital effects while making Cutie Honey. Due to this, he preferred to direct the CGI team as little as possible, having an overview of the entire production system. It was difficult to understand the flow and volume of the film for him, which was a product primarily intended for cinemas, because of the use of small PC screens to watch everything. At first, the staff did not know where CG would be best suited. Daisuke Onizuka, who had worked on Diebuster with Tsurumaki, and Hiroyasu Kobayashi were chosen as CGI directors. While CG is usually required to resemble a live-action film, Onizuka and Kobayashi were asked to recreate the world of miniature sets, typical of live-action films with special effects. Anno often added new cuts just to show off these new details, trains, and other mechanical details in CGI. Kobayashi did the modeling and Onizuka did the animation, making changes and additions well after the storyboarding phase was over. This was due to constant changes in the storyboarding process, the addition of new cuts, and layout revisions. In addition, the buildings in Tokyo-3 were initially supposed to be simple, but Anno kept coming up with new ideas and it was difficult to meet the director's demands under such tight deadlines. As the work progressed, Anno's guidelines became clearer and clearer, and special effects works such as Ultraman served as a guide in the process.

Eiji Inomoto and Ryūta Undo assisted with CGI and visual effects. Undo was in charge of the scene in which Sachiel appears, while Inomoto was in charge of supervising the work of all the CG animators. Undo was responsible for the individual cuts without knowing the overall flow of the film. CG cuts took longer than originally planned, as they also worked on the launch of Eva-01, the ejection of Unit 00's Entry Plug, and the scenes where VTOLs appeared. Most of the cars were also done in CG, and Anno valued precision in the models' details. For the cuts featuring trains, they had Anno come to Orange company so they could work on the layout in real-time; eventually, they also had to make further adjustments at Khara. Undo also became responsible for the frames with the transformers and wagons visible during Operation Yashima. Furthermore, they made last-minute adjustments to control the lighting and shadows in the sequences. The Prog-Knife of the Eva-01 was also rendered in CGI.

Atsuki Satō and Hibiki Watabe also worked on Operation Yashima. At first, the two artists worked on Evangelion: 1.0 alongside layouts for the next Rebuild films. Satō designed, among other things, the Khara logo, which was requested by Anno to be done in the style of Ultraman Taro. The Angel Ramiel was particularly difficult to realize, as in the film it changes size and shape in a wide variety of appearances. Ramiel's original shape was inspired in part by The Andromeda Strain (1971) and in part by an image depicting a four-dimensional object in a three-dimensional world, drawn by Takashi Watabe during the production of The Wings of Honnêamise (1987). However, his initial idea turned out to be impossible to realize. Meanwhile, Higuchi's storyboards only indicated that Ramiel would transform into a form impossible for people to understand. This led to problems for the animators. Due to how difficult portraying the Angel was, Tsurumaki drew a rough sketch of the shape and movement the Angel would have. The finished product was different from this sketch, as the process of creating the Angel was flexible and unconventional.

The images were completed in early August 2007. The final schedule proved tight, and it was difficult to ensure that the final layout, finished in July, was consistent. The artists also stated that they did not have to worry too much about the consistency of the product as much as they did about its communicative effectiveness. While working on Ramiel, for example, there was a rendering error, as the reflections of the lower and upper faces of the Angel were reversed. Tsurumaki, however, said to leave it that way because Anno would like it better. They superimposed different images of the reflected background on Ramiel, layering different types of lighting; however, Satō and the others had to wait until the backgrounds were ready as they tended to arrive later than expected. Another difficult image to achieve in CGI was the lights of the Japanese archipelago going out. There was detailed direction on this from the beginning, taking into account the power companies and stations in each area. Main lines and sections within each power company were calculated, making the system turn off accordingly.

=== Special effects ===
Shōichi Masuo was appointed as the special effects director. Masuo was called while he was still working on Demonbane, so he was unable to join the team until October 2006. Neon Genesis Evangelion utilized graphical gimmicks made with the means available during the production, so for Evangelion: 1.0 Masuo tried to recreate the feel of the anime, but in digital form. He also utilized new gimmicks that were impossible to use during the production of the series. In the process, he mainly used Adobe After Effects. The CG was supplemented with hand drawings: wave splashes, for example, are usually done in CG, but according to Masuo the process does not do them justice and is graphically unsatisfactory. He received requests for texture changes for these details, thus creating the material in analog; the paper drawing was then scanned, transferred to software, processed, and then digitally retouched.

At first, Anno gave the special effects team creative freedom, waiting until the last few months of production to give more precise and crisp instructions. A lot of CG was used for parts that looked the same as the old ones; the goal was to give the impression of cel-shading, so everything computer-generated looked like it was drawn by hand. The mobile buildings of Tokyo-3 were particularly complicated, as they were treated as if they were mecha. Masuo compared the buildings to the mobile constructions of Stingray by Gerry Anderson, to the buildings of the Mothra kaijū films, and to the turrets that come out during the interception of the monsters of Destroy All Monsters (1968). The buildings and poles were in fact drawn as characters. Digital did not always turn out to be faster than traditional, as it was particularly difficult to render the muzzle flash of the Eva units' bullets, which would have taken five minutes to draw in analog.

=== Voice acting ===
The voice acting for Evangelion: 1.0: You Are (Not) Alone officially began on July 31, 2007. The voice acting took place at Tokyo TV Center Studios, while the final sound mix was done at MA Studio. The character voices, music, and sound effects, which were recorded and processed separately, were merged for the first time during the mixing process. The final stages began on August 22. Masayuki and Anno attended the recordings; however, Masayuki only reported errors in the audio synchronization due to Anno's strong presence.

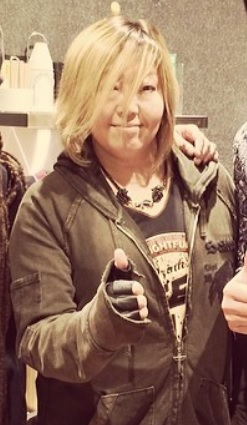
Megumi Ogata reprised her role as Shinji Ikari.

- Megumi Ogata returned to play the main character, Shinji Ikari. The voice actress noted that by the end of the film, her character had already taken a different direction from Neon Genesis Evangelion. Although ten years had passed since the film The End of Evangelion, Ogata had continued to play the character in other media, such as video games. Given Shinji's characterization as a passive boy who simply reacts to the information or actions of other characters, Ogata found it difficult to act without the other performers in the other incarnations; however, she found it easier during the production of the Rebuild tetralogy as other voice actors returned to the room. Unlike the other performers, Anno did not give her instructions, instead telling her to act how she pleased. The performance was not easy, and it took time for the voice actress to get into the spirit of the film. The first day in particular was tiring, and by the end she felt exhausted. In the scene where Shinji is attacked by the sixth Angel and is burned by the enemy, for example, she recorded a scream which caused a slight burn in her windpipe.
- Akira Ishida reprised the character of Kaworu Nagisa. In the original series, Kaworu appeared only in the twenty-fourth episode, so his early presence served to make people understand that the Rebuild did not correspond to the Neon Genesis Evangelion. During the recordings Anno gave him an explanation about Shinji and Kaworu's roles in the new tetralogy, so he based his interpretation on what he understood from the information he received from the director.
- Megumi Hayashibara reprised the character of Rei Ayanami. The order of recording did not follow the order of events, but was done according to a very precise arrangement of scenes. Hayashibara had continued to dub Rei in the years between the classic series and the Rebuild, but only for limited readings. The voice actress was therefore indifferent to the announcement of the Rebuild tetralogy, and only afterward did she enter the project. After an initial embarrassment, she was able to record quietly, without any hiccups or disturbances whatsoever. Anno gave her no specific instructions, exchanging only a few words with him during lunch breaks.
- Kotono Mitsuishi returned to play Misato Katsuragi. Misato's character is twenty-nine years old, and due to the passage of time between recording lines for Neon Genesis Evangelion and the Rebuild tetralogy was instructed to adopt a more youthful tone than in the series. Mitsuishi had also continued to voice her character, who died in the feature film The End of Evangelion, in video games. According to Mitsuishi, this created another Misato in her mind, one that was far from the director's vision of the characters. Given the time that elapsed between the two interpretations of Misato, the actress initially tried to avoid a simple copy of the original version of the character, trying to recreate the spirit of the original one. In the end, despite the differences and different nuances, there were no major changes in terms of acting.
- Fumihiko Tachiki returned to play Gendo Ikari. At the time of recording lines for Neon Genesis Evangelion, Tachiki had difficulty getting in touch with his character. With Evangelion: 1.0, however, since his age was closer to Gendo's, he found things easier than before. The voice actor compared the feeling he experienced to a feeling of happiness, a happiness "that only parents can feel for their children".

Sayaka Ōhara also participated in the film voicing background ads by unnamed operators, and would later continue acting in the Rebuild tetralogy by playing Sumire Nagara in Evangelion: 3.0 You Can (Not) Redo (2012).

=== Photography and sound ===
T2 Studio's Toru Fukushi was chosen as the director of photography. He had difficulties during the photography process, feeling that despite his efforts much of the atmosphere and flavor of the original anime was lost as if there was "an impassable wall". According to Fukushi, digital technology has the advantage of controlling all the elements, while eliminating chance, which he said was an important component of the process. The digital format allowed for easier implementation of drawings, joining them to the backgrounds and superimposing the camera work done by the director. The characters and mecha processed through CG also went through a compositional stage with materials similar in type to rhodium-glass.

In the compositing stage, the staff made use of various types of effects, mostly filters and lighting effects such as blurring, wave glass (or irregular distortion), and multiple exposures. Other effects that were used were transmitted light, which strikes a subject from the top, para, and flare: with para, a portion of the surface appears to be coated with kerosene, while flare involves the insertion of diffused light. The director did not initially give any particular guidelines on photography. For particular cuts, however, Fukushi went to Khara, where Anno and Tsurumaki sat next to him and made adjustments cut-by-cut without any clear policy. Anno's tastes eventually emerged, and in the end, Fukushi spent most of his time in the director's presence adjusting paras and flares. Fukushi had to pay particular attention to the luminescent parts of the Eva-01, as they required a photographic effect inserted as a digital mask, with transmitted light and multiple exposures. The upper part of the screen in the night battles was made darker, to emphasize the sense of immensity. Anno asked for the cityscape to be drawn with a bright sky at first, so as not to lose detail, and then asked to have the scene darkened later.

The sound effects were handled by Tōru Noguchi, a member of Anime Sound. Noguchi had already worked on Renewal of Evangelion, which entailed remastering the audio of the original series to 5.1 surround sound. For the Renewal tetralogy, however, there were difficulties due to Anno's typical style of overlapping dialogue and sound information. At the beginning, Noguchi tried to subtract some sound information for Evangelion: 1.0 to make the sound more understandable for viewers. He also fielded different requests from Anno, so he worked and edited until the last minute. At first, Noguchi thought he would simply copy the sounds of the TV series and extend them for a film release, but his plans led to a much different result. The process was not easy, and since he had to work on an already existing product, he found many difficulties up to the end of the production. Noguchi thought about quitting, but hesitated because of the impact his departure would have on King Records and the rest of the team.

When he received the storyboard, Noguchi only had vague information about the sound direction. He based much of the material on the sounds already present in Neon Genesis Evangelion; for example, he gave the Angel Ramiel feminine vocals. During its transformation scenes, he also inserted metallic noises, though Anno said nothing in particular about it. Noguchi was able to take departures from the sound design of the original series, for example, superimposing various sounds including a vocal element and a ray-like sound for the Angel's shield. He found difficulty creating the modulation of the Eva-01's machine gun, as Masayuki had many requests and Noguchi had difficulty finding a balance between his and Masayuki's ideas. He kept the sound of the Positron Rifle as similar to the original one as possible. Anno also gave him specifications on the types of trains used in the film, making a detailed plan of how the sounds would change accordingly. For the train visible during a vision of Shinji, they asked him to use the sound recorded for Shiki-Jitsu, a 2000 film also directed by Anno.

=== Post-production ===
Hiroshi Okuda was brought in to edit the film, taking over from assistant director Ikki Torodoki. He had previously worked with Anno on Nadia, the live-action segment of The End of Evangelion, Love & Pop (1998) and Cutie Honey (2004). Okuda used Avid Technology and worked to edit the film well into the voice acting stage, after the recording program had passed its deadline. When he put together the film, it was two and a half hours long; however, Toshimichi Ōtsuki requested that the film be finished around ninety minutes, so Okuda cut the first half down. It was difficult for Okuda to decide where to put Rei's activation test scene, but due to the film being shot on digital, tests could be completed and he could experiment with scene placement. This gave him more versatility than in his previous works.

=== Music ===
The soundtrack for Evangelion: 1.0 was composed by Shirō Sagisu, who had previously composed the music for the original television series. Sagisu, who was accustomed to not looking for too much information on the films he worked on, chose instead to carefully read the storyboards of Evangelion: 1.0 You Are (Not) Alone. First, he went to King Records to retrieve and copy the original scores, re-watching Neon Genesis Evangelion on DVD. He first went to Khara to discuss the score on March 16, 2007, seeking advice from Anno, who told him that the music should have "depth". Sagisu wrote the music in Paris and recorded demos at Abbey Road Studios in London, following Anno's precise direction about the use of music, timing, and lengths of music used in the scores during the most important stages of recording. The soundtrack was then mastered in Los Angeles.

It took five weeks for Sagisu to write the songs and record the demos, then another ten weeks to record the final soundtrack. Old songs were re-arranged and re-recorded; given the advancement of technology, the work was simplified compared to his earlier work with Anno, and the crew could see, hear, and control the soundtrack even in the intermediate stages of production. This allowed for more possibility for experimentation compared to the production on Neon Genesis Evangelion, where the music was recorded and edited on analog. On May 11, the composer sent a demo of the column from London to the Khara studio. The recording sessions in London ended in early July, then Sagisu moved to Tokyo, where the music was then completed. Sagisu chose to record in London because he found English studios more advanced and reliable than Japanese studios, with availability for 5.1 channels and the option to use screens to synchronize his music with video. Some tracks were given titles in French, others in English, depending on where he was working at the time.

Japanese singer Hikaru Utada performed on two tracks, namely "Beautiful World", the film's end credits music, and "Fly Me to the Moon", her rendition of a jazz standard which was used as both the ending theme of Neon Genesis Evangelion and the music for the first trailer of Evangelion: 1.0. Both tracks were later included in Utada's single "Beautiful World/Kiss & Cry", which was released in Japan on August 29, 2007. The entire soundtrack of the film was released on two albums, along with songs featured in the film by Hikaru Utada and Kotono Mitsuishi. The first, Shiro Sagisu: Music from "Evangelion: 1.0 You Are (Not) Alone", was released by King Records on September 26, 2007; the second, Evangerion Shin Gekijōban: Jo Original Soundtrack (ヱヴァンゲリヲン新劇場版:序 オリジナルサウンドトラック), contains tracks that appear in the film but were not included in the previous album and was released on May 21, 2008.

== Release ==
=== Marketing ===
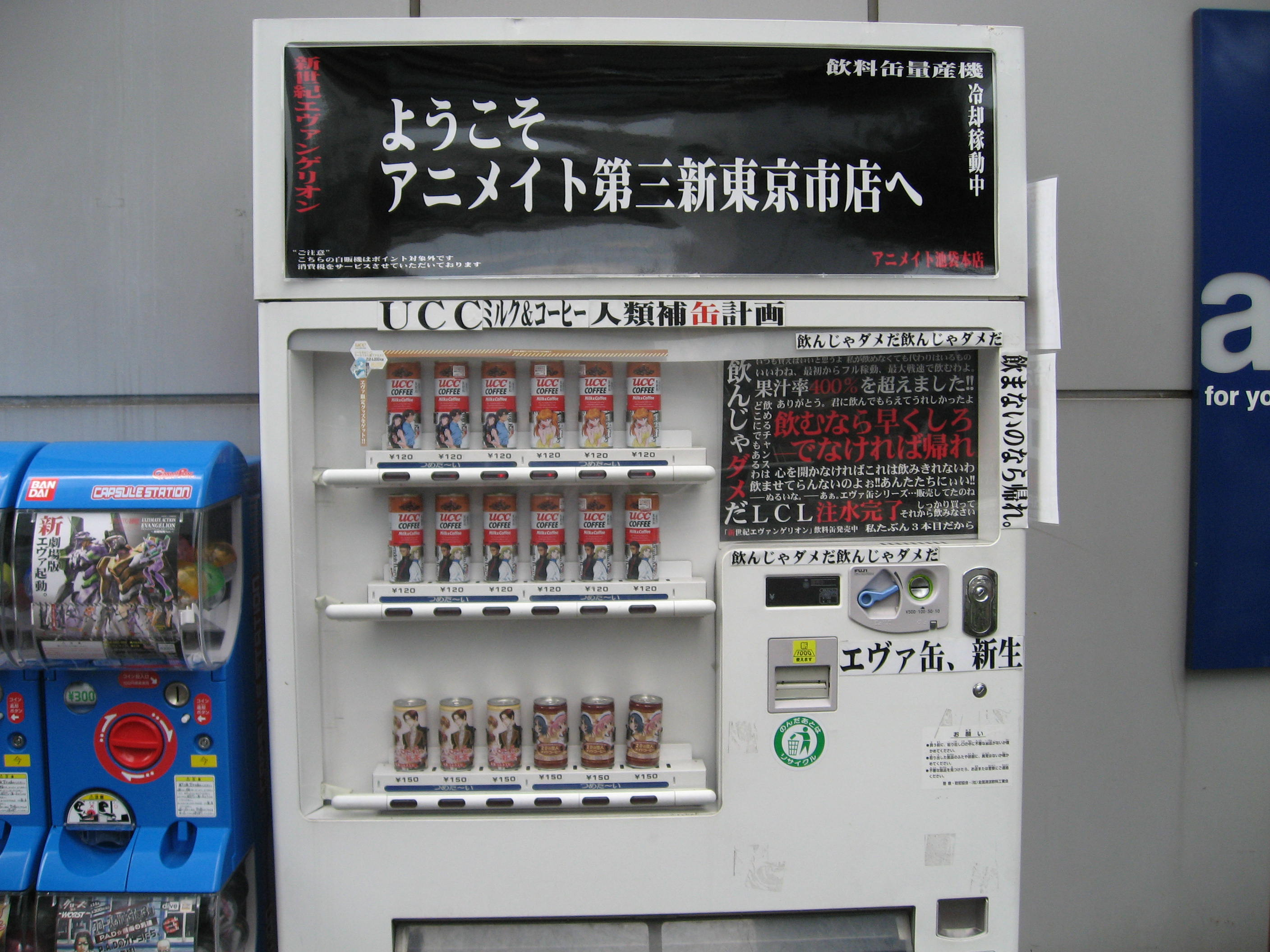
A CC Ueshima Coffee vending machine during the marketing campaign for Evangelion 1.0, filled with cans depicting characters from the Evangelion franchise. This campaign proved successful, with nine million cans released in Japan.

The film was announced in Newtype magazine on September 10, 2006, and was originally scheduled to be released in early summer 2007. In preparation for the release, Anno published a letter with mission statements for both Evangelion: 1.0 and the rest of the Rebuild tetralogy, which was then displayed in poster format in fifty Japanese cinemas. On February 17, 2007, a special was released online which announced the film would be released on September 1, 2007. Three more Rebuild specials were released afterward, one in late February, one in March, and one in April. Pre-sale tickets were first made available on April 28, though the official pre-sale began on June 9. The first trailer for Evangelion: 1.0, featuring Hikaru Utada's "Fly Me to the Moon (In Other Words)", was released on July 17. A second trailer, which included images portraying Kaworu Nagisa and featured the song "Beautiful World", was released on August 11.

Before the release of Evangelion: 1.0, Khara collaborated with companies such as Rolling Stone magazine, Pizza Hut, Doritos, Ueshima Coffee and Frito-Lay in order to promote the film's theatrical release. Many of these brands were later added in scenes of the film. For the release of Evangelion: 1.0, three hundred thousand cases of Evangelion UCC Coffee character-themed coffee cans were put on the market, corresponding to about nine million cans. According to Toshimichi Ōtsuki, no major advertising deals were made in order to give the customer a sense of exclusivity, as if they had to fight to see the film or buy the official brochures.

A wide range of Evangelion-themed merchandising products was distributed, such as posters, keychains, pins, stickers, pens, wallets, mugs, and action figures. An official pamphlet about the film was also distributed during the theatrical screening, selling about 290,000 copies. In March 2008, Bandai released an Evangelion: 1.0 card game entitled Cardass Master Evangerion Shin Gekijōban: Jo (カードダスマスターズ ヱヴァンゲリヲン新劇場版：序). A collection of interviews, illustrations, drawings, and preparatory sketches of the film was also released in the same year in a publication named Evangelion 1.0 Complete Records Collection (ヱヴァンゲリヲン新劇場版：序 全記録全集, Evangerion Shin Gekijōban: Jo zen kirokuzenshū). On June 4, 2009, an official video game about the film was released for PSP and PS2; for the game, the battles were recreated in 3D, giving the player the possibility to choose between the atmosphere of the Rebuild and that of the original series. Elements from the film were later picked up for pachinko games, such as CR Evangerion 〜 hajimari no fukuin〜 (CRヱヴァンゲリヲン 〜始まりの福音〜) and CR Shinseiki Evangelion: Saigo no shisha (CR新世紀エヴァンゲリオン ～最後のシ者～).

=== Japanese release ===
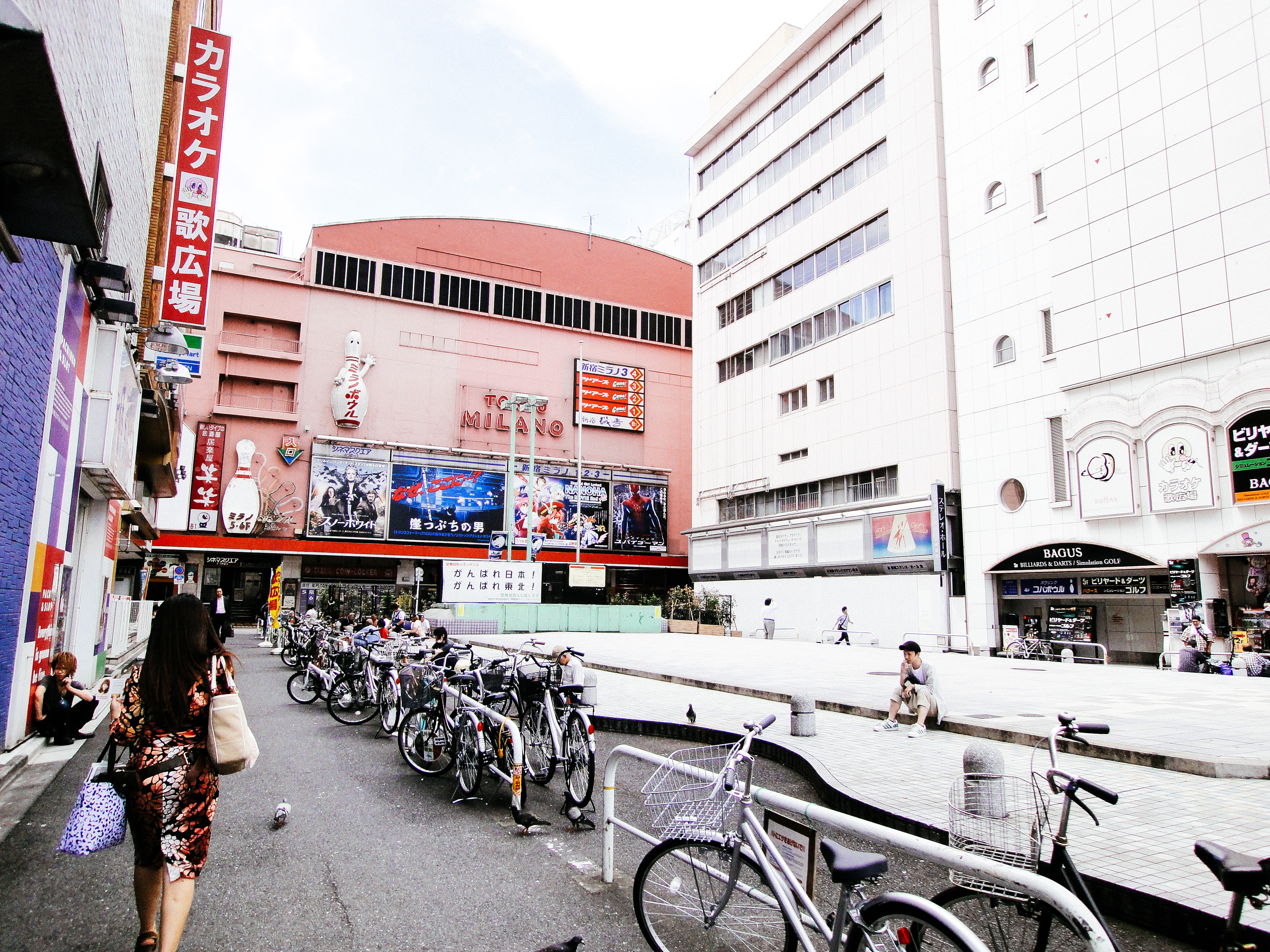
The Shinjuku Milano-za; the film was supposed to make its debut at Cinema Square Tokyo, but was then moved to Milano 1 due to the high audience turnout

The film was initially scheduled to be screened at the Tokyo Square Cinema within the Tokyo Milano Cinema complex in Shinjuku; however, the theater's seating capacity of 224 was insufficient to accommodate the large audience. The screening was moved to the Milano 1, which had a capacity of 1,046 seats. On the day of the premiere, seven consecutive screenings were held from the morning until the theater closed, during which the film received an enthusiastic response from the audience. The film was then released in eighty-four theaters on September 1, 2007. On April 26, 2008, Evangelion: 1.01, the home video version of the film, was shown in some theaters, and then released on DVD on May 16. Furthermore, on New Year's Eve 2013, Evangelion 1.0 was screened along with Evangelion: 2.0 and Evangelion: 3.0 in a special marathon in forty-four Japanese cinemas. An edited-for-television version of Evangelion: 1.01 was broadcast during NTV's Friday Roadshow segment on July 3, 2009, and the password for a special puzzle game about the Rebuild tetralogy was made available during the broadcast.

Evangelion: 1.0 was released on YouTube in 2020 and was made available for free between April 20 and 30 on the official Khara YouTube channel. The film was also made available between April 18 and 30 on the official Eva Extra app. An official live broadcast of the film on Google Meet with Japanese singer Yōko Takahashi as a guest was held on April 25 and 26. On May 14, the film was then broadcast on the Line Live platform. Evangelion: 1.0 was later re-released in eighty-two Japanese cinemas in 4DX and MX4D technology on December 4, 2020, to promote the release of Evangelion: 3.0+1.0 Thrice Upon a Time, the fourth and final film of the Rebuild tetralogy, followed by screenings of the next two films in the tetralogy in the following days; explanatory booklets of each Rebuild installment, which were released at the time of the films' debut, were re-distributed for the screening. In the same month, all three films of the saga were released on Japan's Amazon Prime Video. On March 5, 2021, Evangelion: 1.0 was broadcast in its entirety on Prime Video Japan's YouTube channel.

==== Home-video release ====
Evangelion: 1.01, the first home video edition of the film, was released on DVD by King Records on April 25, 2008. To improve the visual experience of the film, Anno made 266 changes to the video and audio of Evangelion: 1.0, none of which substantially altered the plot of the feature film. The staff used an HD telecine system made from a new print of the film's 35mm print and, under the director's supervision, the music and images for Evangelion: 1.01 were recalibrated. This home video edition was released in a special limited run of three hundred thousand copies, with a bonus disc containing Explanation of Evangelion: 1.01, a subtitled version of the film with technical information, information about the characters, and a promotional video of Operation Yashima set to the track "Angel of Doom". This video was later released on King Records' YouTube channel. The edition also included a reel containing five random stills from the feature film, extra content, and promotional videos. A standard edition of Evangelion: 1.01 was released on DVD on May 21, 2008.

When the final release date of Evangelion: 2.0 was officially announced on February 20, 2009, King Records announced a new version of Evangelion: 1.0 for the home video market, Evangelion: 1.11. This new version was released on May 27, 2009, in Blu-ray and DVD formats. The Blu-ray featured Super Bit Mapping for Video (SBMV), a new mixing system developed for Sony. Evangelion: 1.11 is 101 minutes long, three minutes longer than Evangelion: 1.01. The bonus video Rebuild of Evangelion: 1.01, which was already present in the special edition of Evangelion: 1.01, as well as unreleased footage from Evangelion: 2.0, was included in both the DVD and Blu-Ray editions.

=== English-language release ===
Evangelion: 1.0 was screened at various English-language festivals between July 2008 and March 2009, including the Seattle International Film Festival, Anime Expo in Los Angeles, San Diego Comic-Con, the Waterloo Festival for Animated Cinema and the AFI Dallas International Film Festival. In November 2008, Funimation issued a cease and desist order to fansubbers of Evangelion: 1.0 on behalf of Nippon TV, along with several other anime properties. Then, on December 31, 2008, Funimation announced that it had acquired the rights to the first Rebuild of Evangelion film. On May 23, 2009, the cast for the film's English dub was announced at Anime Boston, with Spike Spencer and Allison Keith reprising their respective roles as Shinji Ikari and Misato Katsuragi. The film was shown at limited engagements in theaters in the United States before premiering in Canada on September 30. The film is rated PG-13 in the United States for action, violence, and some nudity. You Are (Not) Alone was screened in at least 77 film theaters across North America, 60 of which are in Canada. Funimation released Evangelion: 1.01 on DVD in North America on November 17, 2009, and later released 1.11 on Blu-ray and DVD on March 9, 2010. The film was first released on DVD in Australia by Red Ant Enterprises on November 12, 2008. As Red Ant Enterprises went into receivership in January 2009, that release is no longer available for sale. The Australian rights to Evangelion: 1.0 have since been sub-licensed to Madman Entertainment, who have a special relationship with Funimation and have the rights to various TV series and films from Manga Entertainment and ADV Films. Madman Entertainment released the film in Australia on November 30, 2009. 1.11 was also aired on Adult Swim's Toonami block on March 16, 2013 and had drawn nearly one million viewers for its airing despite the film being given a TV-14-LSV rating due to several scenes depicting nudity being cut from the broadcast.

In 2021, Amazon Studios acquired the streaming rights to all of the Rebuild of Evangelion films. The 1.11 version of the film became available on the streaming service on August 13, 2021. It featured full re-dubbings of all Rebuild films, including several voice actors from the A.D. Vision and Manga Entertainment localizations of the original series and films, in place of the mostly new cast used in the Funimation adaptations of the Rebuild series and Netflix's adaptation of the series. Like Netflix's release, it also included a full re-translation by Khara's in-house translator, Dan Kanemitsu.

== Reception ==
=== Box office and public response ===
Evangelion: 1.0 grossed 280 million yen within the first two days of its theatrical run, ranking first in the box office that week with 236,158 admissions. The press described the film's opening weekend as a great success; it was also the first film to open in the first place while also screening in less than a hundred theaters throughout Japan since the national weekly box office charts began circulating in December 2003. From the opening numbers, Evangelion: 1.0 was predicted to gross one and a half to two billion yen during its theatrical run. The following weekend, the film continued to perform well at the box office, though it fell to second place with the release of the Japanese film Hero. By the third week, the film had already grossed one billion yen, maintaining its second-place position at the box office behind Hero. At the end of its fourth week, it reached one million ticket sales, but dropped to fourth place after Hero, Fantastic Four: Rise of the Silver Surfer, and Arthur and the Invisibles. Evangelion: 1.0 then dropped to eighth place, where it remained for two more consecutive weeks before dropping to ninth and tenth place in the following weeks. By the end of 2007, the film had grossed two billion yen, making it the fifteenth highest-grossing film in Japan in 2008 and fourth highest-grossing animated film in Japan, behind Pokémon: The Rise of Darkrai, Doraemon: Nobita's New Great Adventure into the Underworld and Detective Conan: Jolly Roger in the Deep Azure. The popularity of Evangelion: 1.0 caused increased sales and rentals of home video releases of Neon Genesis Evangelion, Neon Genesis Evangelion: Rebirth, and End of Evangelion. According to Evangelion Chronicle, the franchise's official magazine, one hundred five Japanese theaters screened the film, attracting 1.5 million filmgoers.

Oricon reported that the Evangelion: 1.0 home video releases were a success, with the Evangelion: 1.1 special edition DVD selling 219,000 copies in its first week of release. This made it the highest-grossing film of the week and the best-selling release of the Evangelion franchise's home media. At the end of 2008, 297,927 copies of the special edition DVD were sold, making it the third best-selling DVD of the year, behind only Transformers and Pirates of the Caribbean: At World's End, and Amazon Japan's best-selling DVD of the year. A GfK Japan poll declared it the best DVD release of 2008. Vinyl reels of stills from the film distributed as part of the special edition copies were sold at high prices in online auctions, receiving attention from Japanese media. "Fly Me to the Moon" and "Beautiful World" were downloaded 276,000 and 881,000 times respectively as early as October 2007, one month after the film's release.

The franchise and its characters returned to Newtype magazine's monthly popularity charts, taking the top ten spots for months. In January 2009, the magazine compiled a ranking of the most popular anime of 2008, with the Rebuild ranking seventh. Rei Ayanami ranked ninth among a ranking of the most popular female characters published in the same issue. The home video releases ranked second on Amazon.co.jp, behind The Garden of Sinners. The Evangelion: 1.0 video game and Evangelion: 1.11 Blu-ray and DVD release were also successful, with Evangelion: 1.11 selling 49,000 copies in its first week, breaking the record previously set by Christopher Nolan's The Dark Knight, making it the single best-selling debuting Blu-Ray in Japanese history. Three weeks later, it had surpassed 63,000 sales, beating the lifetime sales record held by The Dark Knight. The record remained unbeaten until February 2009, when sales were surpassed by Michael Jackson's This Is It. The Evangelion 1.11 Blu-Ray remained among the best-selling anime releases into mid-2010. Evangelion: 1.01 was then broadcast on NTV's Friday Road Show on July 3, 2009, attracting 12.7% of the share of television viewers that night. The official website of the Friday Road Show also had the highest number of hits in its history. When the film was released on Khara's YouTube channel on April 20, 2020, it exceeded one million views in about fifteen hours and had been seen by two million people in a single day, attracting enthusiastic comments and reaching almost eight million views in two weeks. The same year, it was broadcast by NHK at 11:45 p.m., and despite the time, the hashtag #エヴァ序 became the second most trending hashtag on the Japanese version of Twitter; terms related to the film also appeared in the same ranking, such as Operation Yashima, Shinji, Misato, Kaworu, and "Beautiful World". The limited 4D screening on December 4 was also a success, managing to take seventh place in the box office that weekend.

==== Outside Japan ====
Evangelion: 1.0 was shown in theaters throughout Asia. In South Korea the film was released in 2008 and had a seven-week theatrical run. It grossed $36,603 in its opening week and took in $517,159 in total, attracting over forty thousand viewers in five days. Meanwhile, in Hong Kong, the film ran for four weeks, grossing $139,527, $62,114 of which was made in the first weekend. It reached sixth place in the Hong Kong box office. In Taiwan, Evangelion 1.0 made $1,557,417 during its four-week run. In Malaysia, the film ran for three weeks, making $5,796 in total.

Europe and North America also saw limited runs of the film. Evangelion 1.0 ran for two weeks in both Spain and France, grossing $8,834 and $11,592 in total respectively. In Italy, Evangelion 1.0 was screened alongside Evangelion 2.0 in a marathon event named Evangelion Night, attracting 25,000 viewers on September 4, 2013. It was the highest-grossing film that ran that day, grossing €250,000. The film also ran for nineteen weeks in the United States, grossing $107,797.

=== Japanese critical response ===
Newtype, a Japanese pop culture magazine, claimed that Evangelion 1.0 "was greeted with the highest praise and acclaim of 2007". Matthew Roe of Anime News Network reported that the film received considerable positive feedback from fans and critics, eventually becoming one of the most praised and highest-grossing Japanese animated films of that year. The magazine Excite praised the changes to Shinji's character, mentioning the fact that he does not run away like in the series, how he is generally less depressed than his original counterpart, and his new bonds. Another positive note for Excite would lie in the fact that during the Rebuild tetralogy, the bonds between the protagonist and his friends would be strengthened. The scene in the film where Misato and Shinji hold hands before Operation Yashima was also met with praise.

=== English-language critical response ===
What flashed on my screen and came out of my speakers was an imperfect, but still remarkably well-executed re-envisioning of the Evangelion anime series. ... Despite the quickness of the story thus far, the title manages to retain a good amount of its original character development and maintain its "more questions asked than answered" story hooks. This is great as most of the filler in the series, which consisted of Shinji moping noisily, has been cut down if not removed entirely.
Eric Surrell (Animation Insider)

The reception from English-speaking critics has been generally positive. On the review aggregator website Rotten Tomatoes, 71% of 7 critics' reviews are positive. On Metacritic, the film has a 66 out of 100 based on four reviews, indicating "generally favorable reviews". After its release, almost all reviewers praised the technical aspects of the film with emphasis on the graphics. Critic Paul M. Malone, for example, writing for the academic journal Mechademia, praised the animation for being "beautifully upgraded" from its 1995 equivalent, expanded for widescreen, and enhanced by well-integrated CGI. Writer Thomas Lamarre particularly praised the special effects used during Operation Yashima and on the Angel Ramiel, while Zac Bertschy of Anime News Network praised "the excellent fight scenes", giving the animation an A, the art department an A−, and Sagisu's sound department a B score.

Critics particularly praised the battles and the action element. Screen Anarchy's Peter Martin, for example, praised Evangelion: 1.0 You Are (Not) Alone's good snappy pace, action scenes, and plot, saying "I left the theater feeling satisfied from the combination of entertainment and somber contemplation of the future". In 2009, Northwest Asian Weekly ranked it among the best Asian films released that year in American theaters, while Los Angeles Times reviewer Charles Solomon listed it first among the best home video releases the following year. Slant Magazine's Michael Peterson judged it "a fascinating entity", Polygon's Allegra Frank called it a "beautiful" film, and Rehan Fontes of Comic Book Resources described it as a good summary and "a solid remake" of the classic series. For Los Angeles Times's Kevin Tomas, the story "possesses a true of character". The Village Voice described it as an "entrancing" film, especially during Shinji's fight sequences.

Other reviewers greeted the film negatively. For Slant Magazine, the plot is a simple summary of the first episodes of the classic series, as complicated as the original, and a "very attractive but fundamentally pointless" film. Angelo Delo Trinos of Comic Book Resources described it as "a rushed and truncated summary of Evangelion for newcomers". Carlo Santos of Anime News Network reviewed the film giving a C to the plot and closing the review by asking, "Isn't this the same thing as the TV series but with more rainbows?". ComicsAlliance complained of inconsistency and poor pacing, aggravated by the presence of scenes without emotional impact. Escapist Magazine was also critical of this aspect, believing that "every subtle development is conveniently thrown onto the viewer's lap with little pacing". For Madeline Ashby of Mechademia, the plot of Evangelion: 1.0, despite the cuts to the source material, could still be cryptic and off-putting to viewers looking for answers. Mike Hale's review for The New York Times was particularly critical; for Hale, the material is overly condensed, losing everything he said distinguished the first part of the original series. He cited the removal of thoughtful pacing, humor, and the changes to the characterization of the protagonists. Hale then concluded the review by writing, "Evangelion becomes just another giant-robot story. The original series is available and represents a much better investment". Other critics instead appreciated the characterization of the protagonists. For IGN, Evangelion: 1.0's Shinji is a slightly better character than his counterpart in terms of emotion, while for Kotaku Evangelion: 1.0 is visually better, has better pacing, and explores the physical and emotional struggles of the protagonist better than Neon Genesis Evangelion.

=== Accolades ===
Year	Award	Category	Result	Recipient	Reference
2007	Digital Contents Grand Prix	DCAJ Chairperson Award	Won	Evangelion: 1.0 You Are (Not) Alone	
2007	Golden Gross Award	Golden Gross Topical Award	Won	Evangelion: 1.0 You Are (Not) Alone	
2007	Japan Otaku Awards	Genpachi Tōkaimura Award	Won	Evangelion: 1.0 You Are (Not) Alone	
2008	Tokyo Anime Award	Animation of the Year	Won	Evangelion: 1.0 You Are (Not) Alone	
2008	Tokyo Anime Award	Best Director	Won	Hideaki Anno	
2008	Animation Kobe	Best Animated film	Won	Evangelion: 1.0 You Are (Not) Alone	
2008	Japan Academy Film Prize	Animation of the Year	Won	Evangelion: 1.0 You Are (Not) Alone	

== Sequel ==
The next film in the Rebuild tetralogy, Evangelion: 2.0 You Can (Not) Advance, was previewed in a post-credits trailer. The sequel continues the story with the introduction of Asuka Langley Shikinami, redesigned Eva units, new characters, and hints of a storyline that further departs from Neon Genesis Evangelion. The sequel was released in Japan on June 27, 2009, with a Blu-ray and DVD release titled Evangelion: 2.22 You Can (Not) Advance released on May 26, 2010.
