= UCC Ueshima Coffee Co. =

Japanese coffee and tea manufacturer

UCC Ueshima Coffee Co., Ltd.
- Native name: ユーシーシー上島珈琲株式会社
- Company type: Kabushiki Kaisha
- Industry: Restaurants, Retail Beverages
- Founded: 1933; 93 years ago
- Founder: Tadao Ueshima
- Headquarters: 7-7-7 Minatojima-Nakamachi, Chuo-ku, Kobe, Hyōgo, Japan
- Revenue: ¥138.5 billion (2015)
- Number of employees: 799 (2015)
- Website: www.ucc.jp

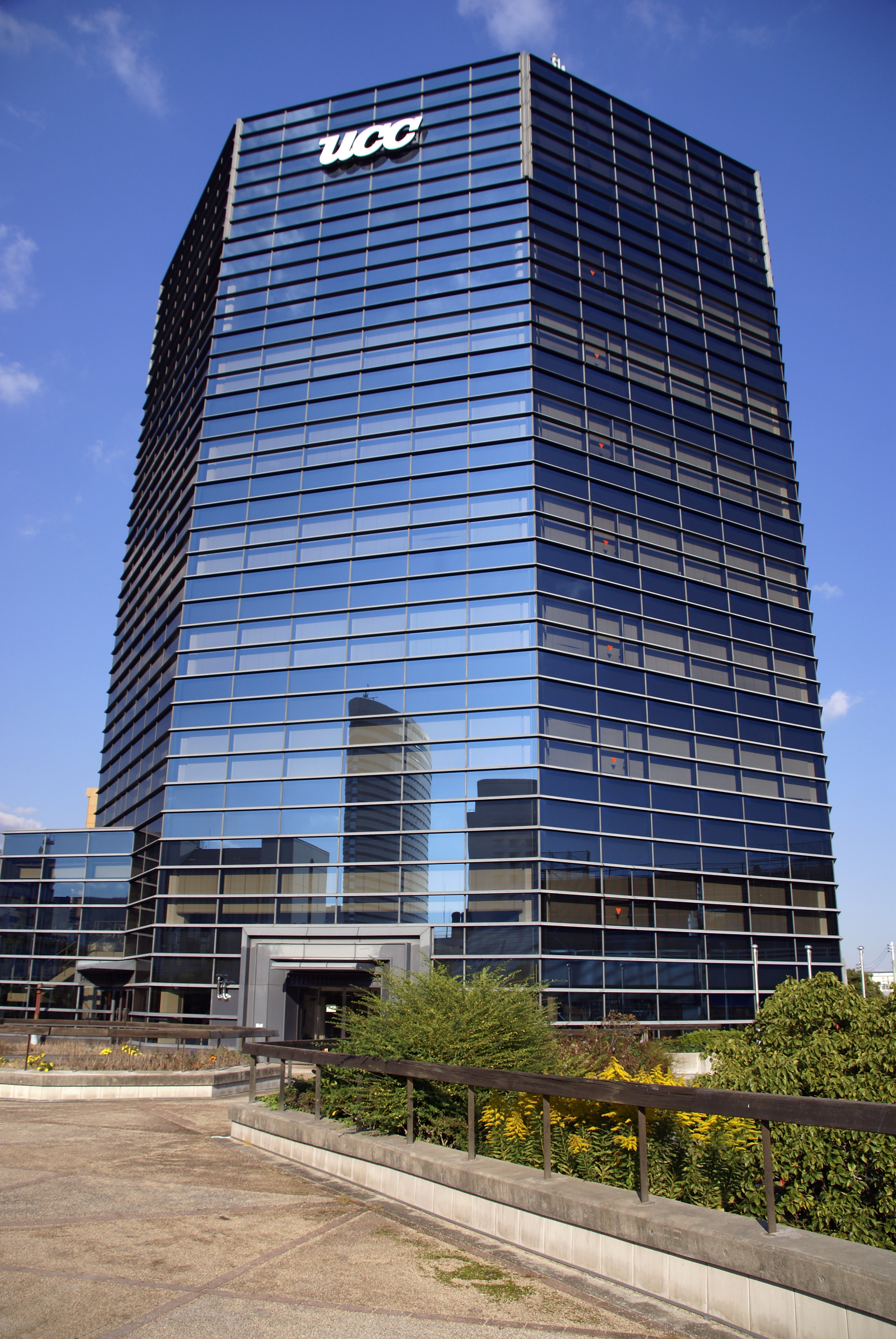
UCC Ueshima Coffee Co., Ltd. headquarters in Kobe

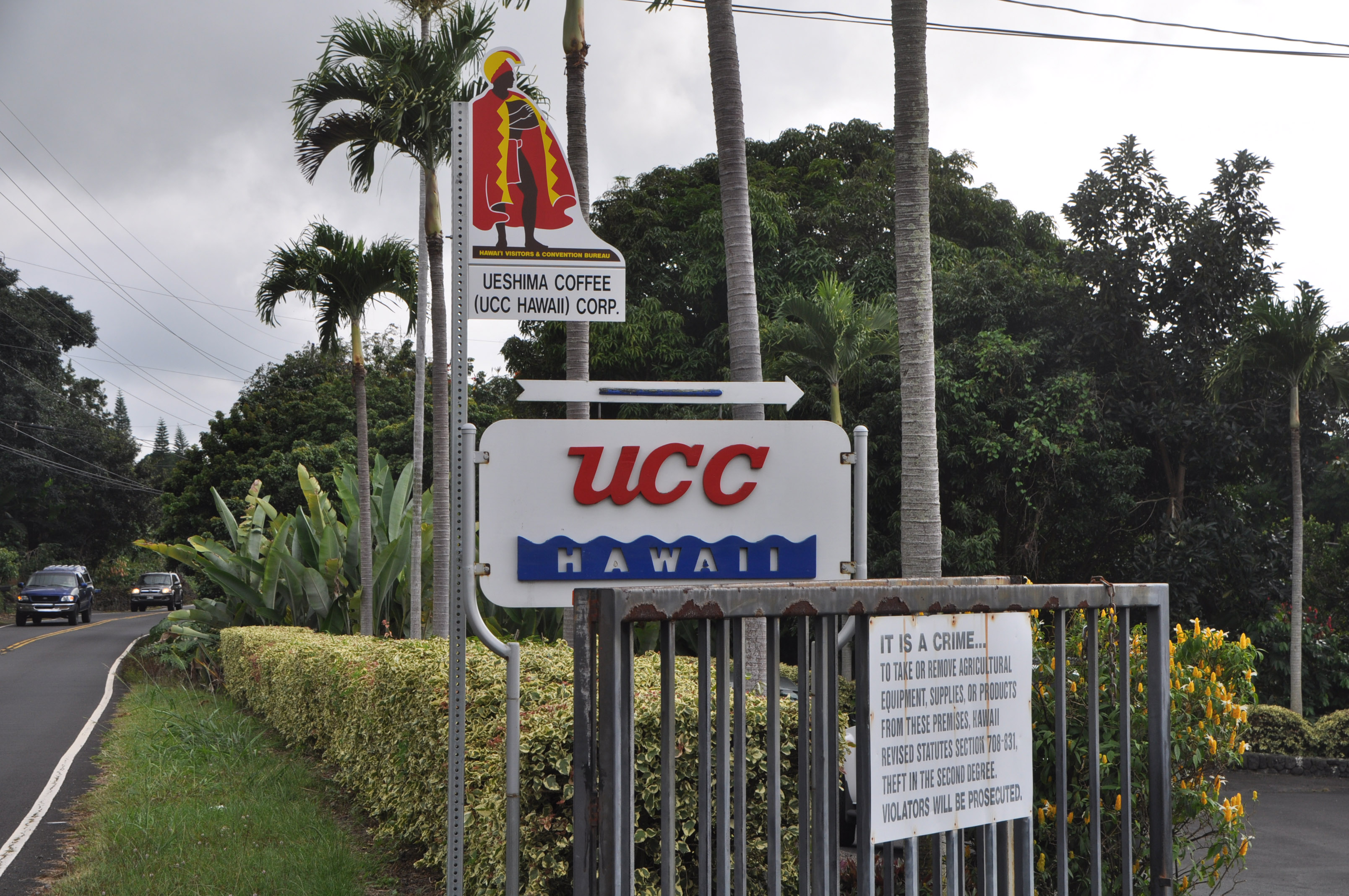
Ueshima Coffee (UCC Hawaii) Corp.

UCC Ueshima Coffee Co., Ltd. (UCC上島珈琲株式会社, Yū Shī Shī Ueshima Kōhī Kabushiki-gaisha) is a manufacturer of coffee and tea products in Kobe, Hyōgo. "UCC" stands for "Ueshima Coffee Company".

It owns a Kona coffee farm on the island of Hawaii. The company is a part of the UCC Group.

== History ==
The company started as a store under the name of "Ueshima Tadao Shoten" in 1933. It became a limited partnership in 1940 and in 1951, became "Ueshima Coffee Co., Ltd.". The company introduced the world's first canned coffee, "UCC Coffee with Milk" in April 1969, which started the trend for canned coffee (缶コーヒー) in Japan.

It formally became "UCC Ueshima Coffee Co., Ltd." in 1991.

== Holdings ==
- UCC Ueshima Coffee Co. (America) Inc. (100%)
- UCC Hawaii Corporation
- UCC Craighton Coffee Estate (Jamaica)
- UCC Europe Limited (London)
- UCC ANZ Limited (Australia & New Zealand)

== Marketing tie-ins ==
UCC Coffee became famous with otaku (anime fans) around the world after their canned coffee was featured in the 1997 feature film The End of Evangelion. As a tie-in with the makers of the film, UCC created six coffee can designs featuring the Evangelion characters holding the company's products. These cans subsequently became prized collector's items. UCC continued this partnership when, a decade later, a new set of four Evangelion films began their release with 2007's Evangelion: 1.0 You Are (Not) Alone. The cans were again featured in the film, and UCC again featured illustrations of the film's characters on a limited release of their cans. In 2009, UCC created another line of limited edition cans featuring the characters from the second film in the series, Evangelion: 2.0 You Can (Not) Advance.
