= Shenyang Jianzhu University Urban Construction College =

University college of Shenyang Jianzhu University in Shenyang, Liaoning, China

- Established: 2000 - present
- Location: Shenyang, Liaoning, China
- Website: http://www.sjcy.cn/

Shenyang Jianzhu University Urban Construction College is a part of Shenyang Jianzhu University. It is located in Shenyang, Liaoning, China
