= Red Ant Enterprises =

Australian video game, anime, home video and PC software distributor

- Trade name: Red Ant Enterprises Pty Ltd
- Industry: Video game
- Founded: 2001; Australia
- Defunct: August 23, 2011
- Fate: Dissolved
- Headquarters: Australia
- Website: http://www.red-ant.com.au/

Red Ant Enterprises Pty Ltd was an Australian owned video game, anime, home video and PC software distributor. Red Ant was the largest such company in the country, as well as the local distributor for over 30 publishers that are based overseas, including 505 Games and Oxygen Games and previously European subsidiaries of Japanese companies such as Capcom Europe and Rising Star Games before Red Ant went into receivership. The company was deregistered by ASIC on 23 August 2011.

Red Ant Enterprises partnered with Rialto Distribution to start their home entertainment division which features independent and/or less-known films. In 2008, Red Ant announced they acquired the license from Gainax to release Evangelion: 1.0 You Are (Not) Alone as their first move into the anime industry. Red Ant owned the licenses to Evangelion 1.0 and Oh! Edo Rocket, and secured the rights to Perfect Blue, which Madman Entertainment (Australia's largest Anime sub-licensee and distributor) lost in late 2008. Red Ant Enterprises only owned the rights to the Japanese subtitled versions of these titles.

Red Ant Enterprises had announced a new distribution deal with Konami of Europe, whose products were then distributed in Australia and New Zealand by Atari Australia. The deal was to come into effect early in 2009, but since Red Ant went into administration, Konami of Europe decided to return to Atari.

== Receivership ==
On 21 January 2009, Red Ant announced that the company had gone into receivership. This affects all their distribution deals with Red Ant having done deals with European subsidiaries of Midway, Konami and Capcom. Konami immediately reacted with KOE President Kunio Neo breaking their deal with Red Ant Enterprises and staying with Atari Australia Pty. Ltd. On 11 February 2009, Capcom Europe returned to their previous distributor THQ Asia Pacific. Rising Star Games has assured Australian retailers that Red Ant Enterprises' collapse has not affected the sale of their products in Australia. Rising Star Games had signed with AFA Interactive in August 2008 with Red Ant Enterprises distributing games submitted to the OFLC on behalf of Rising Star Games before then. All remaining Rising Star assets at Red Ant are being moved over to AFA, with Nintendo Australia having all distribution rights to the Harvest Moon series on all Nintendo systems and use the Rising Star Games version.

This event also affects all home entertainment licenses held by Red Ant Enterprises. Red Ant Enterprises partnered with Rialto Distribution when Red Ant ventured into home entertainment. Most likely all licenses held by the company will be sold by receivers Deloitte to try to pay as much back to the creditors as possible. The 3 anime licenses, Perfect Blue (Previously held by Madman Entertainment under license from Manga Entertainment) was given to Siren Visual, Evangelion: 1.0 You Are (Not) Alone was given to Madman Entertainment, and Oh! Edo Rocket hasn't been relicensed as of 2014.

On 14 April 2009, European publishers 505 Games, Black Bean, N3V Pulblishing and System 3 went to Gold Coast based distributor, All Interactive Distribution. Bethesda Softworks subsequently also went to All Interactive Entertainment to handle distribution for their titles.

The company was deregistered by ASIC on 23 August 2011.

Within a month of the company's announcement of receivership, the former owner of Red Ant Enterprises, Julian White, was able to create a licensing consultancy agency by the name of Tuff Kat. The agency brought former Red Ant client 505 games. In October 2009, the Red Ant's Report As To Affairs revealed that over $2,000,000 had been loaned to subsidiaries and trust funds all owned by Julian White.

== See also ==
- List of games distributed by Red Ant Enterprises
