= Korea: Forgotten Conflict =

2003 real time strategy video game

- Developer: Plastic Reality Technologies
- Publisher: Cenega Publishing
- Engine: Typhoon
- Platform: Windows
- Release: November 2, 2003
- Genres: Real-time strategy Stealth
- Mode: Single-player

Korea: Forgotten Conflict is a real-time strategy, stealth game that takes place in the Korean War. It was developed by Czech studio Plastic Reality Technologies and published by Cenega Publishing.

== Gameplay ==
Korea: Forgotten Conflict is a stealth game based on the Commandos gameplay style of interdependent characters solving puzzles based mainly on stealth. The player receives a number of commandos each mission and they have some special abilities (medic, sniper, engineer, spy and assassin), with the main gameplay focusing on inventory management and basic combat. Stealth is rudimentary and doesn't affect the mission beyond enemies trying to attack the player's units. The AI is noticeably bad and enemies will attack in without proper regard to their safety and are really quick to forget about hunting down the commandos, resuming patrols beside piles of bodies like nothing happened.

The game is real time with the possibility of pausing and giving orders by waypoint so the units can carry them out at the same time. In Mission 3: The Streets of Seoul the player receives command of US Army soldiers to fight North Koreans in open battle. Missions also revolve around Korean War themes such as POWs, MiG fighters and Soviet advisors. The Chinese army is not present in the game, but enemies carry red books with them. The player can also attract enemies with cigarette packets and adult magazines.

The player can control vehicles such as jeeps, military trucks and tanks. The environments are both outdoors and indoors. The game proper starts after two tutorials.

== Characters ==
There are five characters in Korea: Forgotten Conflict.

- Ranger: Benjamin Jacob Goodlover, "BJ Goodlover", the first character the player controls in the game. He is an expert with knives, his bio mentioning past experience as a butcher. He is a black US Ranger.
- Korean specialist: Kim Yoon-Soo, "Kato", a Korean guerrilla that can disguise himself as a North Korean officer. Kato is also a taekwon-do martial arts expert.
- Medic: Sarah Parker, the game lore says her nickname is "Honey Bear" but she is only addressed in-game as "Sarah Parker". Her appearance is anachronistic since women from the UN regular forces didn't fight in the Korean War, only serving in auxiliary capacities. The lore bio states she is a professional nurse who worked in MASH before she joined the Commando.
- Engineer: Connor McGregor, "Scot", is an Australian combat engineer that can handle explosives, find land mines with a detector and pick them up. The lore bio says he carries his ANZAC bush hat but that wasn't included in the game.
- Sniper: Nighthawk is an American Indian that serves as the sniper. He doesn't carry bodies of dead enemies due to evil spirits.

== Development ==
=== Design ===
The game was developed by Plastic Reality Technologies, a Brno-based studio founded in 2000. Development of the game began in September 2001. It was designed using the Typhoon engine, using full three-dimensional graphics. The game faced production struggles.

=== Release ===
In July 2003, Plastic Reality announced a release date for the game in October of that year, with the title being published in Poland by Cenega Poland. At the 2004 E3 in mid-May, Cenega Publishing presented the game; they also presented it at the ECTS trade fair that August. A demo version was uploaded to Gry Online on October 20, 2003, and a patch was sent out in May 2004. An Xbox version of the game was planned but was never released. In 2006, Paradox Interactive included the game as part of the catalogue available in their electronic distribution system GamersGate.

== Reception ==
Reception

Aggregate score
Aggregator	Score
Metacritic	56/100

Review scores
Publication	Score
Computer Gaming World	2/5
Game Informer	5/10
GamePro	3/5
GameSpot	6.7/10
GameSpy	3/5
IGN	5/10

Korea: Forgotten Conflict received mixed to negative reviews from video game critics. Wargamer.com's Will Trotter expressed his hatred towards the game, finding nothing redeemable about it. Gry Online saw similarities between the title and the recently released UFO: Aftermath.

GameSpot critic Jason Ocampo remarked:

"In copying the Commandos formula so thoroughly, Korea also inherits many of the same problems. While you're given a certain amount of open-endedness in how to accomplish your mission, there are also plenty of moments when the designers force you to jump through hoops. For instance, it's not enough that you can commandeer any number of enemy trucks on one map. To escape, you have to commandeer a specific truck that's surrounded by guards. There's no good reason for this other than to put yet another obstacle in front of you."

The game won the Wargamer 'Best in Show' award for its showing at E3.
