= German submarine UC-2 =

Two submarines of Germany have borne the name UC-2:

- SM UC-2, a Type UC I submarine both launched and lost in 1915
- UC-2, formerly the B-class submarine HNoMS B-6 captured from Norway in 1940

== See also ==
- German Type UC II submarine
