= Exploration (disambiguation) =

Exploration is the process of discovery.

Exploration or explorations may also refer to:

== Music ==
- Exploration (album), by Grachan Moncur III, 2004, and its title track
- Explorations (Bill Evans album), 1961
- Explorations (Louis Bellson album), 1964
- Exo Planet #5 – Exploration, a 2019 tour by Exo
  - Exo Planet #5 – Exploration (album), 2020, and its title song

== Television ==
- "Exploration", an episode of QI, 2007
- Explorations (TV series), a documentary 2003–2004

== Other uses ==
- Exploration (board game), 1967
- Exploration (video game), 1994
- Explorations Volume 2: Survival, Growth & Re-birth, 1961 spoken-word album by Gerald Heard

== See also ==
- List of explorations
- Age of Exploration (disambiguation)
- Explorer (disambiguation)
- Exploration Peak (disambiguation)
- Exploration Park, in Florida, U.S.
- Exploration Place, a science museum in Wichita, Kansas, U.S.
- The Exploration Museum, in Husavik, Iceland
- Explorations V Children's Museum, in Lakeland, Florida, U.S.
- Explorations Academy, in Bellingham, Washington, U.S.
- The Exploration Company, a European spaceflight company
