= Discovery High School =

Discovery High School may refer to:

- Discovery High School, a high school in El Paso County, Colorado
- Discovery High School (Georgia), a high school in Lawrenceville, Georgia
- Discovery Alternative High School, a high school in Kent County, Michigan
- Discovery High School, a high school in New York City
- Discovery High School (Washington), a high school in Longview Public Schools in Longview, Washington
- Discovery High School of Newton-Conover, a high school in Newton, North Carolina
- Discovery Alternative High School, a high school in South Kitsap School District, Washington

== See also ==
- Discovery Academy (disambiguation)
- Discovery School (disambiguation)
