= Exploration Peak =

Exploration Peak may refer to:

- Exploration Peak (British Columbia), Canada
- Exploration Peak (Nevada), United States
  - Exploration Peak Park, Nevada, United States; a park containing Exploration Peak

== See also ==
- Explorations (disambiguation)
