= List of ships named RRS Discovery =

RRS Discovery may refer to one of four British Royal Research Ships. The first one is best known for the 1901-4 Discovery expedition to the Antarctic led by Robert Falcon Scott and Ernest Shackleton, and is preserved in Dundee.

- RRS Discovery, a British Royal Research Ship launched in 1901
- RRS Discovery II, a British Royal Research Ship launched in 1928
- RRS Discovery (1962), a British Royal Research Ship launched in 1962
- RRS Discovery (2012), a Royal Research Ship launched in 2012

== See also ==
- Discovery (disambiguation)
- HMS Discovery
