= Discovery =

Discovery commonly refers to:

- Discovery (observation), observing or finding something unknown
- Discovery (fiction), a character's learning something unknown
- Discovery (law), a process in courts of law relating to evidence

Discovery, The Discovery or Discoveries may also refer to:

== Film and television ==
=== Films ===
- The Discovery (film), a 2017 British-American romantic science fiction film

=== TV series and episodes ===
- Discovery (Canadian TV series), a 1962–1963 Canadian documentary television program
- Discovery (Irish TV series), an Irish documentary television programme
- Discovery (UK TV programme), a British documentary television programme
- Discovery (U.S. TV series), a 1962–1971 American television news program
- Star Trek: Discovery, an American television series
  - USS Discovery (NCC-1031), a fictional space craft on Star Trek: Discovery
- "The Discovery," the eighth and final episode of Pokémon Evolutions
- "Discovery" (Dawson's Creek), a 1998 television episode
- "Discovery" (Suits), a 2012 television episode

=== Other uses in film and television ===
- Discovery, a section in the Toronto International Film Festival for new directors
- Discovery Channel, an American TV channel owned by Skydance Corporation

== Literature ==
- The Discovery (Frances Sheridan play) (1763)
- The Discovery (Animorphs), children's book
- Discovery, a fictional space ship in Ursula Le Guin's Paradises Lost

== Music ==
=== Albums ===
- The Discovery (album), 2011, by Born of Osiris
- Discovery (Larry Carlton album)
- Discovery (Daft Punk album)
- Discovery (Electric Light Orchestra album)
  - Discovery (music video)
- Discovery (Jewelry album)
- Discovery (Mr. Children album)
- Discovery (Mike Oldfield album)
  - Discovery Tour 1984
- Discovery (box set), a box set of Pink Floyd albums
- Discovery (Shanice album)
- Disc-Overy, 2010, by Tinie Tempah

=== Songs ===
- "Discovery" (song), by Mamoru Miyano
- "Discovery", by Chris de Burgh from Beautiful Dreams
- "The Discovery", a 1974 instrumental Tyner McCoy from Echoes of a Friend
- "Discovery", the third section of the 1976 Rush song "2112"

=== Other uses in music ===
- Discovery Records, a record label
- Discovery (band), an indietronica side project from members of Ra Ra Riot and Vampire Weekend
- Discovery, Op. 13, a song cycle by Howard Ferguson

== Schools ==
- Discovery Academy, Stoke-on-Trent, a secondary school in Staffordshire, England
- Discovery Academy (Richmond Hill, Ontario), a private school in Canada
- Discovery Academy (Provo, Utah), a high school in Utah, US
- Discovery College, a college in Hong Kong
- Discovery Elementary School, a school in School District 36 Surrey, Surrey, White Rock, and Barnston Island, British Columbia
- Discovery Elementary School (Shawnigan Lake), a school in School District 79 Cowichan Valley, Vancouver Island, British Columbia
- Discovery Elementary School, a school in Ashburn, Virginia
- Discovery Elementary School, a school in Palm Bay, Florida
- Discovery Elementary School, a closed school in Fennville, Michigan
- Discovery Elementary School, a school in Kentwood, Michigan
- Discovery Early Childhood Center at Endeavour School, a school in North Hanover Township School District, Burlington County, New Jersey
- Discovery Elementary School, a school in Peninsula School District, Gig Harbor, Washington
- Discovery Elementary School, a school in Issaquah School District, King County, Washington
- Discovery Elementary School, a school in Mukilteo School District, Mukilteo, Washington
- Discovery Elementary School, a school in West Ada School District, Meridian, Idaho.
- Discovery High School, a high school in El Paso County, Colorado
- Discovery High School (Georgia), a high school in Lawrenceville, Georgia
- Discovery Alternative High School, a high school in Kent County, Michigan
- Discovery High School, a high school in New York City
- Discovery High School (Washington), a high school in Longview Public Schools in Longview, Washington
- Discovery High School of Newton-Conover, a high school in Newton, North Carolina
- Discovery Alternative High School, a high school in South Kitsap School District, Washington
- Discovery School, Tegucigalpa, a bilingual English/Spanish school in Tegucigalpa, Honduras
- Discovery, a former primary school now part of Ao Tawhiti, a state area school in Christchurch, New Zealand

== Vehicles ==
=== Air and space ===
- Space Shuttle Discovery
- Aero Concepts Discovery, an American homebuilt aircraft design
- Offpiste Discovery, a British hang glider design
- SC Discovery, a Ukrainian paraglider design

=== Land ===
- Land Rover Discovery and Discovery Sport, a 4×4 SUV

=== Marine ===
- Discovery (1602 ship)
- Discovery (fireboat), operating near the mouth of the Columbia River
- MV Discovery, a cruise ship
- HMCS Discovery, a Vancouver stone frigate
- HMS Discovery (1741), a 6-gun storeship
- HMS Discovery (1774), an 8-gun discovery vessel
- HMS Discovery (1789), a 10-gun sloop
- HMS Discovery (1874), a wood screw storeship
- Discovery, built 1905; see Hudson's Bay Company vessels
- HSC HSS Discovery, a high-speed ferry
- RRS Discovery, the ship on Captain R.F. Scott's Antarctic expedition
- RRS Discovery (1962), a British Royal Research Ship
- RRS Discovery (2013), a British Royal Research Ship

== Other uses ==
- Age of Discovery
- Discovery (apple), an apple cultivar
- Discovery (elm cultivar)
- Discovery (horse), an American Thoroughbred racehorse
- Discovery (synth), a VSTi software synthesizer by discoDSP
- Discovery, Inc., a former American global media and entertainment company
  - Warner Bros. Discovery, successor company formed by merger with WarnerMedia
- Discovery, Weymouth, a science centre in Dorset, England
- Wikimedia Discovery, a search engine project by the Wikimedia Foundation
- Discovery District, an area in Toronto that features hospitals and research institutions
- Discovery doctrine
- Discovery Institute, a non-profit public policy think tank
- Discovery Limited, a South African financial services group
- Discovery Program, a NASA space science program
- Service discovery on a computer network
- Discovery, a generation of Roomba robotic vacuuming devices
- Discovery Walks, natural trails in select parks in Toronto
- Discovery: In the Steps of Columbus, a 1992 video game
- Discovery (video game), a Minecraft clone
- Discovery Zone, a defunct chain of entertainment facilities

== See also ==
- Discover (disambiguation)
- Discoverer (disambiguation)
- Discovery Bay (disambiguation)
- Age of Discovery (disambiguation)
- Discoverability
- Discovery Channel Pro Cycling Team, a professional cycling team
- Discovery One, a fictional space craft from the film 2001: A Space Odyssey
- HMS Discovery, a list of British and Canadian warships
- Self-discovery
