= Discovery Elementary School =

Discovery Elementary School may refer to:

== Canada ==
- Discovery Elementary School, a school in School District 36 Surrey, Surrey, White Rock, and Barnston Island, British Columbia
- Discovery Elementary School (Shawnigan Lake), a school in School District 79 Cowichan Valley, Vancouver Island, British Columbia

== United States ==
- Discovery Elementary School, a school in Ashburn, Virginia
- Discovery Elementary School, a school in Palm Bay, Florida
- Discovery Elementary School, a closed school in Fennville, Michigan
- Discovery Elementary School, a school in Kentwood, Michigan
- Discovery Early Childhood Center at Endeavour School, a school in North Hanover Township School District, Burlington County, New Jersey
- Discovery Elementary School, a school in Peninsula School District, Gig Harbor, Washington
- Discovery Elementary School, a school in Issaquah School District, King County, Washington
- Discovery Elementary School, a school in Mukilteo School District, Mukilteo, Washington
- Discovery Elementary School, a school in West Ada School District, Meridian, Idaho.

== See also ==
- Discovery (disambiguation)
- Discovery Academy (disambiguation)
- Discovery School (disambiguation)
