= Pizza Connection =

Pizza Connection may refer to:

- Pizza Connection (film), a 1985 Italian film
- Pizza Connection (video game), a 1994 economic simulation game
- The New York Pizza Connection, the theoretical correlation between pizza and subway fares
- Pizza Connection Trial, a U.S. criminal case
- Pizza Connection (politics), in German politics, a coalition between the CDU/CSU and Alliance 90/The Greens
