= Discoverer =

Discoverer may refer to:

== Ships ==
- MS World Discoverer cruise ship wrecked off the Solomon Islands in 2000
- Discoverer Clear Leader double-hulled dynamically positioned drillship (2007), sister ships are
  - Discoverer Americas
  - Discoverer Inspiration
  - Discoverer Luanda
  - Discoverer India
- Discoverer Enterprise double-hulled dynamically positioned drillship (1999), sister ships are
  - Discoverer Spirit
  - Discoverer Deep Seas
- Silver Discoverer cruise ship
- Coral Discoverer cruise ship
- USC&GS Discoverer, the name of two ships of the United States Coast and Geodetic Survey

== Other uses ==
- Corona satellites, a 1959-1962 classified U.S. military satellite program publicly labeled the Discoverer non-military scientific program
- The Discoverer, a novel by Norwegian author Jan Kjærstad
- "Discoverer" (R.E.M. song)
- The Discoverers, a non-fiction book
- The Discoverers, film directed and written by Justin Schwarz
- "Discoverer", a song on the album Collapse into Now by R.E.M.
- Discoverer Seamount, an undersea geographic feature named after NOAAS Discoverer (R 102)
- Oracle Discoverer software

== See also ==
- Discover (disambiguation)
- Discovery (disambiguation)
- Once Upon a Time... The Discoverers, French animated TV series
