= Vancouver Fire Department =

Vancouver Fire Department may refer to:

- Vancouver Fire Department (Washington) — The fire department for Vancouver, Washington in the United States.
- Vancouver Fire and Rescue Services — The fire department for Vancouver in British Columbia, Canada
