= Discovery School =

Discovery School may refer to:

- Discovery School, Tegucigalpa, a bilingual English/Spanish school in Tegucigalpa, Honduras
- Discovery, a former primary school now part of Ao Tawhiti, a state area school in Christchurch, New Zealand
- Discovery Elementary School, a school in School District 36 Surrey, Surrey, White Rock, and Barnston Island, British Columbia
- Discovery Elementary School (Shawnigan Lake), a school in School District 79 Cowichan Valley, Vancouver Island, British Columbia
- Discovery Elementary School, a school in Ashburn, Virginia
- Discovery Elementary School, a school in Palm Bay, Florida
- Discovery Elementary School, a closed school in Fennville, Michigan
- Discovery Elementary School, a school in Kentwood, Michigan
- Discovery Early Childhood Center at Endeavour School, a school in North Hanover Township School District, Burlington County, New Jersey
- Discovery Elementary School, a school in Peninsula School District, Gig Harbor, Washington
- Discovery Elementary School, a school in Issaquah School District, King County, Washington
- Discovery Elementary School, a school in Mukilteo School District, Mukilteo, Washington
- Discovery High School, a high school in El Paso County, Colorado
- Discovery High School (Georgia), a high school in Lawrenceville, Georgia
- Discovery Alternative High School, a high school in Kent County, Michigan
- Discovery High School, a high school in New York City
- Discovery High School (Washington), a high school in Longview Public Schools in Longview, Washington
- Discovery High School of Newton-Conover, a high school in Newton, North Carolina
- Discovery Alternative High School, a high school in South Kitsap School District, Washington

== See also ==
- Discovery (disambiguation)
- Discovery Academy (disambiguation)
- Discovery New School, a defunct Montessori free school in Crawley, England
