= SKSD =

SKSD may refer to:

- Shramik Krishak Samajbadi Dal
- Sistem Komunikasi Satelit Domestik
- South Kitsap School District
