= KFC Index =

Informal economic index

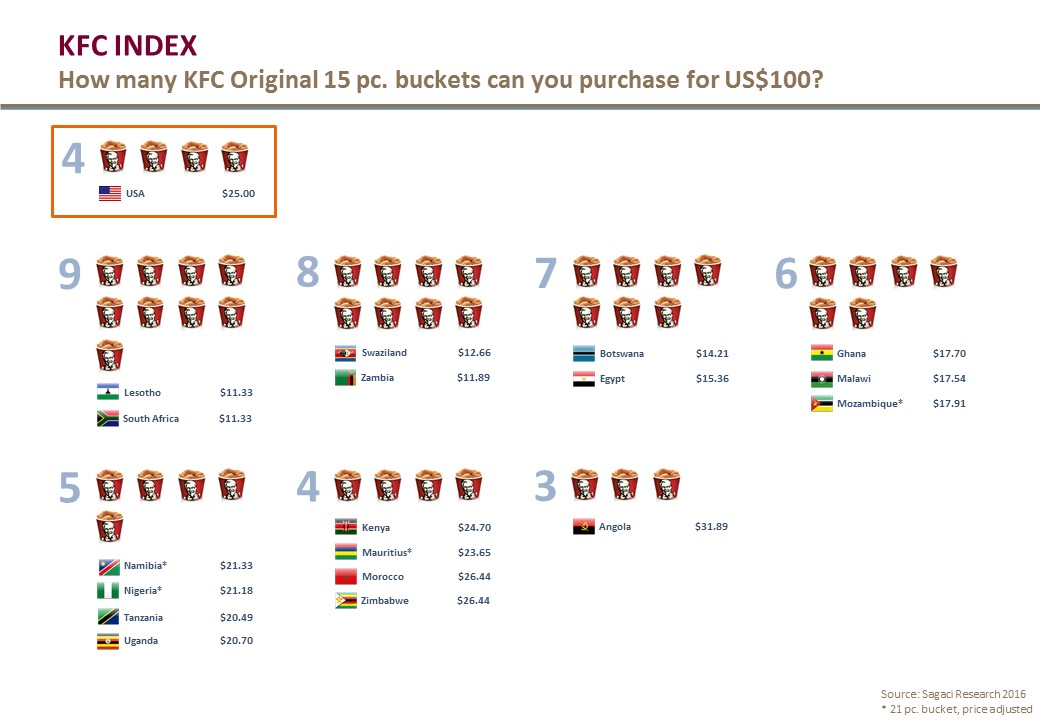
How many KFC buckets can you purchase for $100

The KFC Index is an informal guide to measure purchasing power parity comparing exchange rates in African countries. Inspired by the Big Mac Index, the key difference between the two indices is that the KFC Index focuses solely on Africa; the Big Mac Index coverage is worldwide but not as applicable to Africa since McDonald's has little presence there, whereas KFC chains operate in about half countries across the continent.

== Overview ==
The KFC index was created by Sagaci Research (a Pan-African primary market research firm) as an informal way to gauge whether currencies in African countries are "correctly valued". It is based on the theory of purchasing power parity, which states exchange rates should move towards the rate that would equalize the prices of an identical basket of goods and services between two countries. In this case, the concerned goods are KFC's Original 12/15 piece Bucket and geographically specific to African countries. The KFC Index also covers the United States, France, Spain and the United Kingdom.

For example, the average price of KFC's Original 12 pc. Bucket in United States in January 2016 was $20.50; in Namibia it was only $13.40 at market exchange rates. Therefore, the index suggests that the Namibian dollar was undervalued by 33% at that time.

== Inspiration ==
The index takes its name from the international fast food chain Kentucky Fried Chicken (KFC) and is modeled on The Economist's "Big Mac Index", which covers countries with McDonald's presence (about 60 countries). In Africa, the McDonald's chain is present only in Morocco, South Africa, Egypt and Mauritius. KFC, on the other hand, has operations in almost 20 African countries, which is the highest of any international fast food chain and therefore a more applicable benchmark to use. The index was not intended as a precise gauge of currency misalignment but merely a tool to make exchange-rate theory more digestible.

== Limitations ==
As in the case of the Big Mac Index, the KFC Index was not created to be a highly accurate and precise tool for measuring purchasing power parity and its limitations include factors such as inflation, dietary preferences, socio-economic classifications, levels of competition and local costs (e.g. advertising, production and taxes).

Currency volatility – due to the nature of developing economies (in this case all countries in Africa), there is more likely to be high volatility in currencies, therefore undertaking this analysis over a one to three month basis could produce large changes and different conclusions.

Black market – as there is a thriving market for US Dollars in some countries, it may produce conflicting results compared to the official exchange rate. Angola and Nigeria are examples of these types of markets. The report produced by Sagaci Research takes into account black market exchange rates.

== Figures ==
As of 2016, The publication states:

=== Most overvalued currencies ===
- Angola 72%
- Morocco 30%

=== Most undervalued currencies ===
- South Africa -48%
- Egypt -34%
- Namibia -32%

The June 2016 publication states:

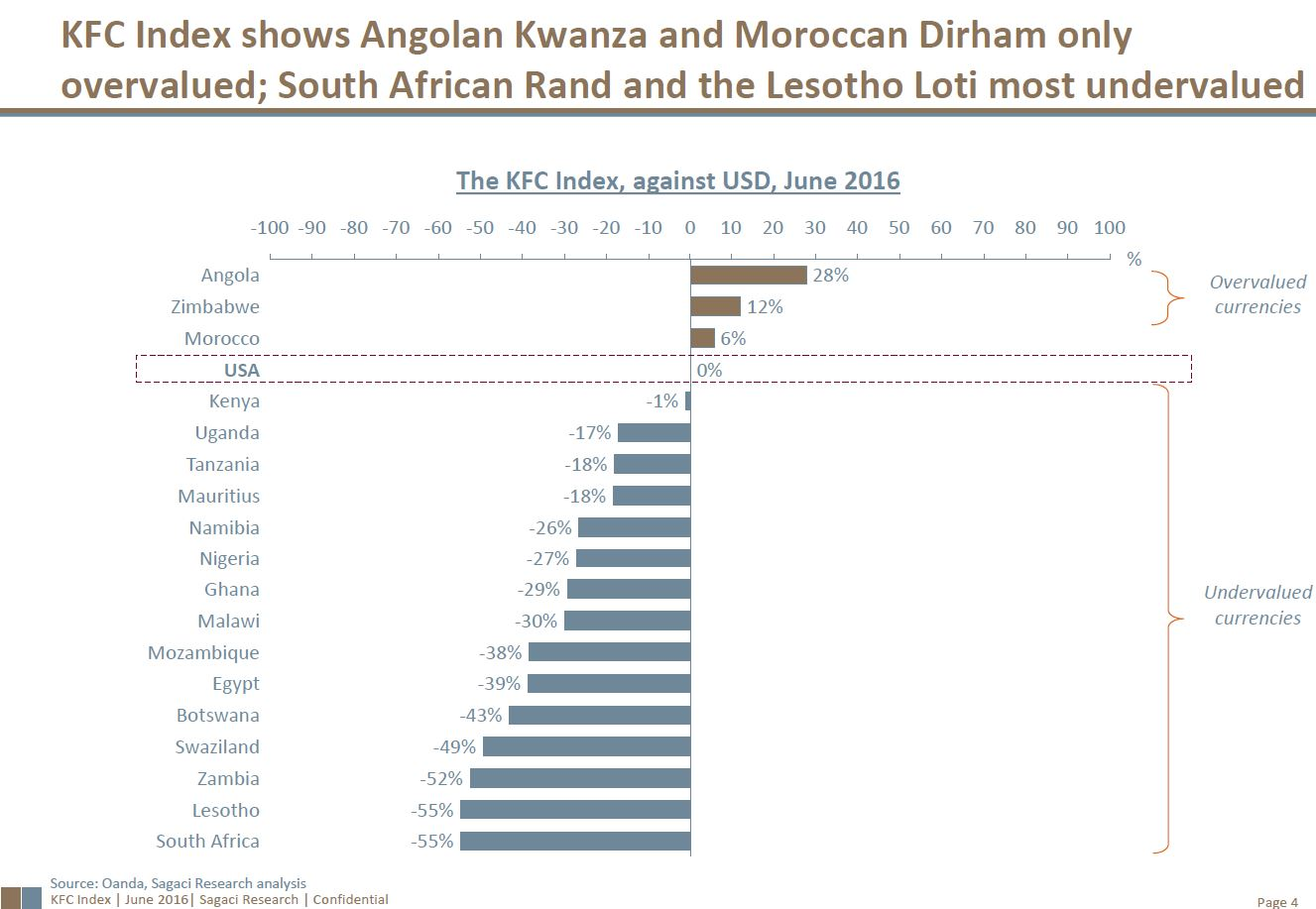
June 2016 chart

== See also ==
- Big Mac Index
- Pizza Principle
- Pizza Meter
- Waffle House Index
