= Voyages of discovery =

Voyages of Discovery may refer to:

- Exploration
- The Age of Discovery, the period in history
- Exploration (video game), a simulation strategy game designed by Software 2000 in 1994
- Voyages of Discovery (cruise line) a cruise line
