= Discovery Academy =

Discovery Academy may refer to:

- Discovery Academy, Stoke-on-Trent, a secondary school in Staffordshire, England
- Discovery Academy (Richmond Hill, Ontario), a private school in Canada
- Discovery Academy (Provo, Utah), a high school in Utah, US

== See also ==
- Discovery (disambiguation)
- Discovery School (disambiguation)
- Discovery Elementary School (disambiguation)
