= Ann Savours Shirley =

British historian of polar exploration (1927–2022)

- in 2015
- Born: 9 November 1927; Stoke-on-Trent, England
- Died: 8 October 2022 (aged 94)
- Education: Royal Holloway College
- Alma mater: Sorbonne
- Known for: Her study of Robert Falcon Scott's ship HMS Discovery
- Awards: Honorary D.Litt., Fellow of the Society for Nautical Research, Murchison Award
- Scientific career
- Fields: History
- Institutions: University of Aberdeen

Ann Margaret Savours Shirley (9 November 1927 – 8 October 2022) was a British historian of polar exploration, covering both the Arctic and Antarctic. She was most widely known for her study of Robert Falcon Scott's ship HMS Discovery.

== Early life and education ==
The daughter of Edgar Walter Savours, a civil engineer, and his wife Margaret, a poet and teacher, she earned her bachelor's degree in 1949 with honours at Royal Holloway College, University of London, then went on to study at the Sorbonne in Paris, where she earned a diploma in French civilization in 1950, and studied art at the Burslem School of Art from 1950 to 1951.

== Career ==
Savours Shirley began her career as a library assistant at the University of Aberdeen from 1952 to 1954, before becoming assistant librarian and curator of manuscripts at the Scott Polar Institute at Cambridge University from 1954 to 1966. In 1970, she became an assistant keeper at the National Maritime Museum, where in 1973 she was appointed custodian of manuscripts. In 1977, she was placed in charge of the Arctic gallery, serving in that capacity until her retirement in 1987.

Savours Shirley was a member of the Cambridge Spitsbergen Physiological Expedition in 1955 and the Australian National Antarctic Expedition in 1960. She was also an honorary research fellow at the Australian National University in 1960–61.

Savours Shirley served as a member of council of the Royal Geographical Society in 1978–80. She was also a member of the council and a vice president of the Hakluyt Society (from 2002) and of the Society for Nautical Research.

== Personal life and death ==
In 1961, she married Lawrence G. S. Shirley, with whom she had two children. Savours Shirley died on 8 October 2022, at the age of 94.

== Awards ==
- Honorary D.Litt, University of Kent, 2001.
- Murchison Award, Royal Geographical Society, 2001.
- Fellow of the Society for Nautical Research, 2015.

== Published works ==
Catalogue of MSS of Polar Interest in Australia and New Zealand, (Cambridge, England: Scott Polar Research Institute, 1963).

- (Editor) Edward Wilson, Diary of the "Discovery": Expedition to the Antarctic Regions, 1901–1904, (London, England: Blandford Press, 1966; Atlantic Highlands, NJ: Humanities, 1967).
- (Editor) Scott's Last Voyage: Through the Antarctic Camera of Herbert Ponting, (London, England: Sidgwick & Jackson, 1974; (New York, NY: Praeger, 1975).
- The Voyages of the "Discovery: The Illustrated History of Scott's Ship, (London, England: Virgin, 1992).
- (Editor, with H.G.R. King) Polar Pundit: Reminiscences about Brian Birley Roberts, (Cambridge, England: Scott Polar Research Institute, 1995).
- The Search for the North-West Passage, (New York, NY: St. Martin's Press, 1999).
- The North West Passage in the Nineteenth Century: Perils and Pastimes of a Winter in the Ice, (London, England: Hakluyt Society, 2003).
