= Discover =

Discover may refer to:

== Art, entertainment, and media ==
- Discover (album), a Cactus Jack album
- Discover (magazine), an American science magazine
- "Discover", a song by Chris Brown from his 2015 album Royalty

== Businesses and brands ==
- DISCover, the Digital Interactive Systems Corporation
- Discover Airlines, formerly Eurowings Discover, a German airline
- Discover Card, a credit card brand
- Discover Financial, defunct former owner of Discover Card

== Science and engineering ==
- DSCOVR, an Earth observation satellite

== See also ==
- Discovery (disambiguation)
- Discoverer (disambiguation)
