= Fast Food Tycoon =

1999 video game

Pizza Syndicate
- Developer: Software 2000
- Publishers: ^{NA} Activision Value Publishing^{EU} Software 2000
- Platform: Windows
- Release: ^{NA} 30 November 2000^{EU} 17 March 1999
- Genre: Business simulation
- Mode: Single-player

Pizza Syndicate (released as Fast Food Tycoon in North America) is a business simulation game released in 1999 by Software 2000 and licensed to Activision Value Publishing. Similar to its predecessor Pizza Tycoon, Pizza Syndicate lets the player manage a pizza restaurant-chain.

The game received an expansion pack, Mehr Biss (lit. 'more bite'), for the German-speaking market, and a sequel, Fast Food Tycoon 2, in 2001.

== Gameplay ==
Pizza Syndicate allows the player to customize their own character, making tradeoffs between personal traits, previous experience, age and wealth. The game allows for both open-ended and objective-driven gameplay.

Control over multiple levels of managing the company is provided, including picking restaurant locations, creating pizza recipes, interior design, global marketing and fast food advertising strategies, employee management, financing, and out-competing rivals.

In addition to being a restaurant business simulation game, Pizza Syndicate also incorporates a Mafia theme, where players can make use of an underground "syndicate" to achieve their goals. The player can choose to take their character on missions, where possible outcomes include the game-ending death of the player character.

Pizza Syndicate is a single-player game, with up to six AI opponents. The game has 20 city locations, and includes up to 140 interactive characters in each city, and soundtracks matching each city location.

== Reviews ==
IGN gave the game a rating of 7 out of 10 ("Good") in 2000, and stated "When you consider that this game goes for around $19.99, it's a pretty good deal if you like economic simulations. Fast Food Tycoon isn't a hard-core sim or anything, but it'll give you some hours of fun equal to what you paid for it."
