= Das Stundenglas =

1990 video game

- Developer: Weltenschmiede
- Publisher: Software 2000
- Programmer: Andreas Niedermeier
- Writer: Harald Evers
- Platforms: Amiga, Atari ST, MS-DOS
- Release: 1990
- Genre: Interactive fiction
- Mode: Single-player

Das Stundenglas (English: The Hourglass) is a German interactive fiction game published in 1990 by Software 2000 and developed by Weltenschmiede. It was released for Amiga, Atari ST, and MS-DOS. Das Stundenglas is part of a trilogy; it is succeeded by Die Kathedrale (1991) and Hexuma (1992). The trilogy lacks an overarching plot, and the setting, role of the protagonist, and goal differ between each game. Games in the trilogy do not require knowledge of the other entries and may be played as standalone games.

== Plot ==
Das Stundenglas takes place in the year 2012, in a post-apocalyptic version of Earth which has been devastated by a man-made ecological disaster. The game begins with the protagonist being chased by a group of bandits while in the ruins of a small town, but they escape into an abandoned toy store. The protagonist discovers a chest, opens it and climbs inside; they then are transported to another world: the town of Munterwassertal, which translates to lively water valley in English. Das Stundenglas includes fantasy creatures such as trolls, witches, dragons and a descendant of the Loch Ness Monster.

Das Stundenglas has time and point mechanics; all actions cause time to pass in-game, while certain actions award the player points. The player's points and the current time are indicated on the right of the screen.

The residents of this world, both human and creature, have coins that the protagonist must collect. The eponymous hourglass is missing along with half of the town's residents, and the protagonist must find twelve coins in order to bring everything and everyone back, and fix the mistakes of the present post-apocalyptic world through actions in the past. The twelve coins belong to the remaining townspeople, and the protagonist must perform quests for them to earn the coins. Each of the coins are marked by a number, and these numbers correspond to archways marked around the town.

The protagonist must find two wizards who possess special sand; the sand belongs to the hourglass, which controls the flow of time in the world. The protagonist has twelve days to recover the sand and return it to the hourglass, or time is irreparable.

In the short novel included alongside Das Stundenglas, it is revealed that eighty years prior to the game's setting, Sir Percival Glanfoss, while seeking a method of time travel, first discovered a time-travelling chest in a Tibetan monastery. Before his death, Glanfoss discovered that a counterpart to the chest existed; this chest was used by the protagonist in the year 2012. Glanfoss collected all the information he had regarding the chest, and sent it to where the second chest was presumed to be; this information was retrieved by the protagonist when they found the chest. The chest in the Tibetan monastery was destroyed when the apocalypse struck.

== Gameplay ==
Time in Das Stundenglas passes by the player performing actions, which consumes time out of the twelve-day time limit. Das Stundenglas has a day-night cycle, which determines the location and daily schedule of NPCs. The player must obtain twelve coins, the hourglass, and the special sand needed for the hourglass within the time limit. The player is required to perform quests for NPCs, e.g. the player must find bagpipes for the descendant of the Loch Ness Monster in exchange for their coin. Each coin is marked by a number and these numbers correspond to archways marked around the town.

Common actions in Das Stundenglas can be performed using hotkeys, and a transcript of the game's text, including dialogue and inputs, can be printed directly from the game. Das Stundenglas has twenty NPCs, over one hundred rooms, and twenty-five graphics to accompany the text.

== Development ==
Das Stundenglas was developed by two people: Harald Evers (née Krüger) and Andreas Niedermeier. Weltenschmiede was formed as a result of Evers and Niedermeier creating Das Stundenglas together; when Weltenschmiede sent Das Stundenglas to publisher Software 2000, they refused to publish the game without graphics. Evers first created concept art for Das Stundenglas by drawing on the back of a receipt while riding home in a taxi. Das Stundenglas's box art was created by Harald Evers on an Atari ST.

Das Stundenglas was released on three 5 1/4-inch floppy disks and also on two 3 1/2-inch floppy disks. The DOS version was released first, and the Amiga version was released two months later. Software 2000 describes Das Stundenglas as an "Artventure" game due to the addition of graphics to the text adventure format - one of eight games in this range. Das Stundenglas was bundled with feelies; a game manual, a map of the game world, a code wheel and a 40-page short novel. As is the case with its sequel, Die Kathedrale, the feelies bundled with the game serve as a form of copy protection, as information from them is necessary to complete the game. Both the Amiga and DOS versions of Das Stundenglas cost 'around 100' Deutschmark in 1990. The DOS version of Das Stundenglas uses EGA graphics.

In a 1991 interview regarding Die Kathedrale, Das Stundenglas was stated to understand 2500 nouns, 300 verbs, and support many "unimportant" words, although what "unimportant" constitutes is not specified.

== Reception ==
Reception

Review scores
Publication	Score
Amiga Joker	80% (Amiga)
Aktueller Software Markt	6.8/12 (DOS); 6.8/12 (Amiga)
Power Play	52% (Amiga); 48% (DOS)

Das Stundenglas was only reviewed in German gaming magazines due to the game only being released in German. Das Stundenglas's native German language text was noted as a positive by reviewers, as German grammar can be complex, i.e. a major difficulty in translating English games into German is that verbs in a sentence are at the end of the sentence in German, rather than being closer to their context as with English. Amiga Joker praised Das Stundenglas's compatibility with multi-clause sentences, which are common in German parlance. Aktueller Software Markt noted Das Stundenglas's text and text input as 'more intuitive' than English games that have been translated into German, and praised the compatibility for special characters used in German such as umlauts and eszett (ß).

Aktueller Software Markt gave the DOS version of Das Stundenglas an overall score of 6.8 out of 12, noting that its graphics were added late into the game's development, expressing that "perhaps this is because the game wasn't very well made. While playing, you shouldn't pay much mind to the graphics, as this is largely a text adventure." ASM praised Das Stundenglas's comprehension of German, particularly umlauts and eszett (ß), expressing this to be in contrast to other adventure games, in which German grammar "doesn't come naturally". ASM simultaneously praised and criticized Das Stundenglas's dialogue system with NPCs, calling it 'extensive' but "glitchy", expressing that "All in all, my opinion is that the price of this game is too high. For one hundred Deutschmark, it shouldn't have glitches." In their conclusion, ASM furthermore criticizes Das Stundenglas's graphics, notably giving the graphics a three out of twelve, and stating that "Another flaw is definitely the graphics. If the game were text only, its quality would not be impaired. If you're looking for a game that's graphically impressive, you should return this game and get a different one."

Aktueller Software Markt gave the Amiga version of Das Stundenglas an overall score of 6.8 out of 12, the same score as their review of the DOS version, stating that "The Amiga version is essentially unchanged from the DOS version." ASM praises Das Stundenglas's gameplay, calling it a "very fun and extensive adventure that keeps the player entertained for a long time", but criticized its graphics, expressing that "The one flaw in the game is the graphics. They were only added to the text adventure after the fact to try to make it look better. The graphics are visually pleasing, but they don't always match the text." ASM expresses that the feelies included with Das Stundenglas help overcome the game's graphical shortcomings, stating that "the story is extensively written out in the feelies. Moreover, the included map is a great help." ASM summarises Das Stundenglas as "an absolutely acceptable game with lots of surprises."

Amiga Joker gave the Amiga version of Das Stundenglas an overall score of 80%, calling it "The best German text adventure so far" and that "Das Stundenglas will hopefully herald a new era of text adventure games, and old Infocom games are hopefully appreciated more due to this revival." Amiga Joker praised Das Stundenglas's plot as "philosophical" and "sophisticated" due to its post-apocalyptic theme and analysis of the "chaos and unrest" in modern times. Amiga Joker, similarly, to ASM, praised Das Stundenglas's "astonishing" comprehension of German, particularly its understanding of multi-clause sentences, but notes that the parser requires specific inputs, e.g. inputting 'book' instead of 'booklet' will not be understood. Amiga Joker criticized Das Stundenglas's graphics, expressing that they "vary in quality", and further criticized the lack of sound, stating that "not even a song on the title screen breaks the silence". Amiga Joker praises Das's puzzles as "new and original" and expresses in their conclusion that they "can say without exaggeration that Evers and Niedermeier have accomplished a lot of work: Das Stundenglas makes possible what many have thought impossible - a German language text adventure game that (almost) reaches the quality of classic Infocom games."

Power Play gave the DOS version of Das Stundenglas an overall score of 48%, giving the graphics a score of 22%, expressing that "The wonderful and exciting story suffers somewhat under the game's graphical shortcomings. The MS-DOS version only supports EGA graphics and wouldn't win an artistic award." Power Play further criticized Das Stundenglas as 'feeling dated', expressing that "a "Wonderland" type of adventure isn't very modern." Power Play gave the Amiga version of Das Stundenglas an overall score of 52%, stating that "Das Stundenglas makes a far better impression on Amiga than on PC: the graphics are distinctly better looking." Power Play notes Das Stundenglas's difficulty, expressing that the game requires extensive reading and puzzle-solving, and concluding their review by calling Das Stundenglas "An interactable fantasy novel that should appeal to adventure freaks from the very beginning."
