= Age of Discovery (disambiguation) =

The Age of Discovery was a period in European world exploring that lead to European global colonization.

Age of Discovery or Discoveries Age may also refer to:

- EverQuest II: Age of Discovery (videogame), a 2011 expansion pack to EverQuest II
- Glenn Drover's Empires: The Age of Discovery (boardgame), a 2007 board game based on the videogame Age of Empire III: The Age of Discovery
- Age of Empires III (videogame), a 2005 video game also known as The Age of Discovery

== See also ==
- Age of Exploration (disambiguation)
- Discovery (disambiguation)
- Age (disambiguation)
