= Ocean Trader (video game) =

1995 video game

- Developer(s): Software 2000
- Publisher(s): Software 2000
- Platform(s): Amiga, MS-DOS
- Release: 10 September 1995
- Genre(s): Strategy
- Mode(s): Single-player, multiplayer

Ocean Trader (also known as Der Reeder in Germany) is a simulation strategy game by Software 2000 which was released in 1995 for MS-DOS and the Amiga.

The game simulates the running of a global shipping company, tasking players with building a prosperous maritime empire.

It features global trade of various goods including containers, refrigerated items, bulk cargo, oil and passengers to ports worldwide. It also has dynamic market commodity trading, multiplayer with other players and bots and allows players to build new ships.

Overall, the game offers a comprehensive simulation of the shipping industry, allowing players to experience the complexities of running a global shipping business.

== Reception ==
Reception

Review score
Publication	Score
Amiga Joker	85/86
