= Age of Exploration (disambiguation) =

The Age of Exploration was a period in European world exploring that lead to European global colonization.

Age of Exploration or Explorations Age may also refer to:

- Imperialism II: Age of Exploration (videogame), a 1999 video game
- The Age of Exploration (series), a set of science fiction novels by C.J. Cherryh
- Age of Exploration (arc), a story arc from the anime and manga Dr. Stone; see List of Dr. Stone characters

== See also ==
- Age of Discovery (disambiguation)
- Explorations (disambiguation)
- Age (disambiguation)
