= Hexuma =

1992 video game

- Developer: Weltenschmiede
- Publisher: Software 2000
- Programmer: Andreas Niedermeier
- Artist: The Pixlers Studio
- Writer: Harald Evers
- Composer: Chris Hülsbeck
- Platforms: Amiga, MS-DOS
- Release: 1992
- Genre: Interactive fiction
- Mode: Single-player

Hexuma, alternatively titled Hexuma: Das Auge des Kal (English: Hexuma: The Eye of Kal) is a German text adventure developed by Weltenschmiede. It was released for Amiga and MS-DOS in 1992 by Software 2000. Hexuma is the last entry in a text adventure trilogy; it is preceded by Das Stundenglas (1990) and Die Kathedrale (1991).

== Plot ==
An estate agency has recently acquired Hawthorne Mansion: a house on an English moor that is rumoured to be haunted, and previous residents supposedly went insane after living there. The player takes the role of an employee of the agency, and arrives at the house to inspect and clean it. The house was built on the site where a 15th century castle once stood, and in the 1920s a scientist named Owen Jugger lived in and studied the house and its haunted past, and then abruptly died.

In the midst of cleaning the house, a parcel arrives to the house addressed to Jugger, that has been in transit for 70 years. It contains Jugger's diary, which contains research about a cult that worships the eponymous god Kal, a malevolent god that has been asleep for eons. The protagonist must continue Jugger's work to stop Kal from waking and returning to Earth, bringing about the end of the world. Doors in the house allow the protagonist to time travel to different points in time: the Mesozoic Era, the ice age, a medieval mine, a 19th century ship in the midst of battle, and far in the future. To defeat Kal, the protagonist must recover five crystal shards from five different periods in history, in addendum to a sixth shard included with Jugger's parcel.

== Gameplay ==
In contrast to classic text adventures, which have no images, Hexuma has over 120 pictures of various locations to accompany the text. Hexuma's backgrounds can be interacted with in the style of a point and click adventure, while interactions with objects are inputted using text commands. In addendum to text commands, Hexuma has a grid of icons for common commands, i.e. ascending or descending stairs and picking up items, and these icons can be clicked to input them. Also exclusive to Hexuma is the addition of an auto-mapping feature. In dialogue, key phrases/topics can be clicked to ask characters for further information, or interact with objects, i.e. inspecting an object for further detail.

The player must collect five crystal shards to defeat the malevolent god Kal; using doors in the Hawthorne Mansion, they may travel to different time periods, each with their respective shard. The five time periods can be accessed in any order, and each time period has a unique musical accompaniment.

== Development ==
Hexuma is the finale of a trilogy of text adventure games about time travel by developer Weltenschmiede; Hexuma is preceded by Das Stundenglas (1990) and Die Kathedrale (1991). Hexuma was bundled with feelies, including a replica of Owen Jugger's diary, a letter detailing the significance of the crystal shards and the awakening of Kal, and a replica crystal shard. These feelies serve as a form of copy protection as they are referenced in the game and required for puzzles. The DOS version of Hexuma uses VGA graphics.

A sequel to Hexuma was announced to be in development as of December 1992, titled Hexuma 2: Dämmerung auf der Höhlenwelt (English: Hexuma 2: Twilight in the Cave World).

== Reception ==
Reception

Review scores
Publication	Score
Amiga Joker	82% (Amiga)
Aktueller Software Markt	9.8/12 (DOS)

Amiga Joker gave the Amiga version of Hexuma an overall score of 82%, noting its fantasy setting as 'dated' but "fun", expressing that "Admittedly, old ruins, strange dimensions and broken rocks are nothing new in adventure games, but the story is full of fantasy, has atmosphere and is fun." Amiga Joker praised Hexuma's 'bright' graphics and noted that in contrast to other text adventure games, "the textbox manages to avoid looking ugly and grey". Amiga Joker praises Hexuma's music as "harmonious", however they express that in the absence of sound effects, Hexuma's feelies provide the atmosphere that sound effects would. Amiga Joker praises Hexuma's UI, noting the compass as 'convenient' and automapping to be "very good", furthermore calling Hexuma's controls 'user-friendly', and noting its text input as "much easier to edit than in Die Kathedrale." Amiga Joker concludes their review by expressing Hexuma to be a 'complete experience', stating that "So what's missing in Hexuma? Well, in Hexuma there's basically nothing missing, but maybe Hexuma is missing – in your game collection!"

Aktueller Software Markt gave the DOS version of Hexuma an overall score of 9.8 out of 12, labelling it as an ASM Hit; it was reviewed by two reviewers: Klaus Trafford and Michael Anton. Trafford praised the game's "many mysteries" and puzzles, as well as its 'intuitive' inputs and UI, expressing that "When you type [commands], you can edit individual letters without having to retype the whole thing. [The player can] re-input previous commands and click important words", and particularly praised Hexuma's auto-mapping feature. Trafford expressed that Hexuma improves upon Die Kathedrale, particularly citing its "evidently" improved graphics; Trafford also praised its "great" gameplay & "very extensive" parser, and expressed that Hexuma is more intuitive than Die Kathedrale, stating that "the common commands from Die Kathedrale have been optimised." Trafford notes Hexuma's writing as "casual" and "not as serious as its predecessors", something that they note as a detriment to the game's "eerie" atmosphere. Trafford criticizes Hexuma's soundtrack, stating that "Not so great is Chris Hülsbeck's music: every world has a different soundtrack, but tracks feel indistinct from one another. In addition, only two tracks are memorable." In his conclusion, Trafford summarised Hexuma as a "superb German language graphics-accompanied text adventure game that has definitely earned the ASM Hit star."

Michael Anton from ASM was more critical of Hexuma, criticising its "unoriginal" gameplay and comparing it to House II: The Second Story. Anton criticised Hexuma's music as being a detriment to the game's otherwise "eerie" atmosphere, expressing that the music quality deteriorated as part of porting the game from Amiga to DOS, and stated that "the translation to PC is sometimes so badly done, that it's genuinely horrible." Anton praised Hexuma's "especially intuitive" controls, and stated that "for a text adventure it's essentially very good", but noted that he was "irritated" by certain aspects of Hexuma's gameplay. Anton furthermore remarks that Hexuma 'feels dated', stating that "the adventure game genre has developed considerably since Die Kathedrale – Hexuma unfortunately arrives too late to be revolutionary."
