= Software 2000 =

German video game developer (1987–2002)

- Industry: Video games
- Founded: 1987
- Founder: Marc Wardenga; Norbert Wardenga; Andreas Wardenga
- Defunct: February 2002
- Fate: Bankrupt
- Headquarters: Schleswig-Holstein, Germany
- Products: Pizza Connection; Pizza Syndicate
- Website: www.software2000.de (archived version 2002-01-18)

Software 2000 was a video game developer and publisher based in Germany.

The company was formed in 1987 in Eutin, Schleswig-Holstein, by brothers Andreas and Marc Wardenga. They produced and published games for various formats, originally the Atari ST and Amiga platforms, and later for the Personal computer (PC), Game Boy Color and a few titles for the PlayStation.

Perhaps their most successful venture was the Bundesliga Manager series, based on the German soccer Premier League. They also produced a series of "Artventure" interactive fiction games, in the German language. In the mid-1990s, they produced other spinoff manager games, including Eishockey Manager (Ice Hockey Manager) and the Pizza Syndicate series for the PC. They also developed the puzzle game Swing, released for the PlayStation in 1998.

The company produced several titles with small development teams. This proved fatal with the rising standards of full priced games. With falling sales and important figures leaving the company, Software 2000 filed for bankruptcy in 2002.

== Games ==
Name	Release year	Platform(s)
Genius	1989	Amiga/PC
Bundesliga Manager	1989	Amiga/Atari ST/PC/C64
Wild West World	1990	Amiga/PC
Lettrix	1990	Amiga/Atari ST/PC/C64
Titano (Magic Soft)	1990	Amiga/PC
Die Stadt der Löwen	1990	Amiga/PC
Das Stundenglas	1990	Amiga/PC/Atari ST
Cubulus	1991	C64/Amiga
Build it – Das Bauhaus	1991	Amiga
Bundesliga Manager Professional	1991	Amiga/Atari ST/PC
Kengi	1991	Amiga/Atari ST/PC/C64
Century	1991	Amiga
Magic Serpent	1991	Amiga
The Manager	1991	Amiga/PC
Shiftrix	1991	Amiga
Die Kathedrale	1991	Amiga/PC
Hexuma	1992	Amiga/PC
Death or Glory	1993	Amiga/PC
Der Schatz im Silbersee	1993	PC/Amiga only Demo
Jonathan	1993	Amiga
Eishockey Manager	1993	Amiga/PC
Die Höhlenwelt Saga: Der leuchtende Kristall	1994	PC
Der Schatz im Silbersee	1994	PC
Der Baulöwe	1994	PC
Christoph Kolumbus	1994	Amiga/PC
Bundesliga Manager Hattrick	1994	Amiga/PC
Pizza Connection	1994	Amiga/PC
Ocean Trader (Der Reeder)	1995	Amiga/PC
Space Marines: Der stählerne Kaiser	1995	PC
Talisman	1995	PC
Bundesliga Manager 97	1996	PC
F1 Manager 96	1996	PC
Flying Saucer	cancelled	PC
F1 Manager Professional	1997	PC
Bundesliga Manager 98	1998	PC
Flying Saucer	1998	PC
Gute Zeiten, schlechte Zeiten	1998	PC
Pizza Syndicate	1999	PC
GZSZ Fun Pack	1999	PC
Pizza Syndicate Mission CD	1999	PC
Swing	1997	Game Boy Color/PC/PlayStation
GZSZ Quiz	2000	PC/PlayStation/Game Boy Color
Superball	2000	PC
Lettrix	2000	PC
Shiftrix	2000	PC
Pizza Connection 2	2001	PC
Bundesliga Manager X	2001	PC
