= Mountain's Edge, Nevada =

- planned community
- Location within the state of Nevada
- Coordinates: 36°01′30″N 115°14′33″W
- Country: United States
- State: Nevada
- County: Clark
- Established: February 2004

Government
  - Type: County Commission
  - County Commissioner: Justin Jones - District F
  - County Commissioner: Michael Naft - District A
  - Liaison: Tiffany Hesser
- Time zone: UTC-8 (PST)
  - Summer (DST): UTC-7 (PDT)
- ZIP codes: 89178, 89139
- Area code: 702
- Website: Official website

Mountain's Edge is a planned community in the unincorporated town of Enterprise in Clark County, Nevada. It is a neighborhood within the southwest part of the Las Vegas Valley.

== History ==
Focus Property Group started the construction of Mountain's Edge in February, 2004. The development plans included 14,500 homes and more than 22 neighborhoods with stores, office space, and shopping centers. Beginning in 2007, Mountain's Edge was the top selling master planned community in the United States for two consecutive years. As of the end of 2025, 12,500 homes and four parks (Nathaniel Jones Park, Paiute Park, Exploration Peak Park, and Mountains Edge Regional Park) as well as other amenities have been constructed with more amenities planned including two more parks (Helen Stewart park and John C. Fremont park), a community center, and a Magnet High School focusing on entrepreneurship planned for 2027 or 2028.

== Schools ==
- William V. Wright Elementary School (2006)
- Carolyn S. Reedom Elementary School (2008)
- Jan Jones Blackhurst Elementary School (2017)
- Tyrone Thompson Elementary School (2020)
- Barry and June Gunderson Middle School (2021)
- Doral Academy-Cactus Campus (2015)
