= Pentagon pizza theory =

Correlation theory

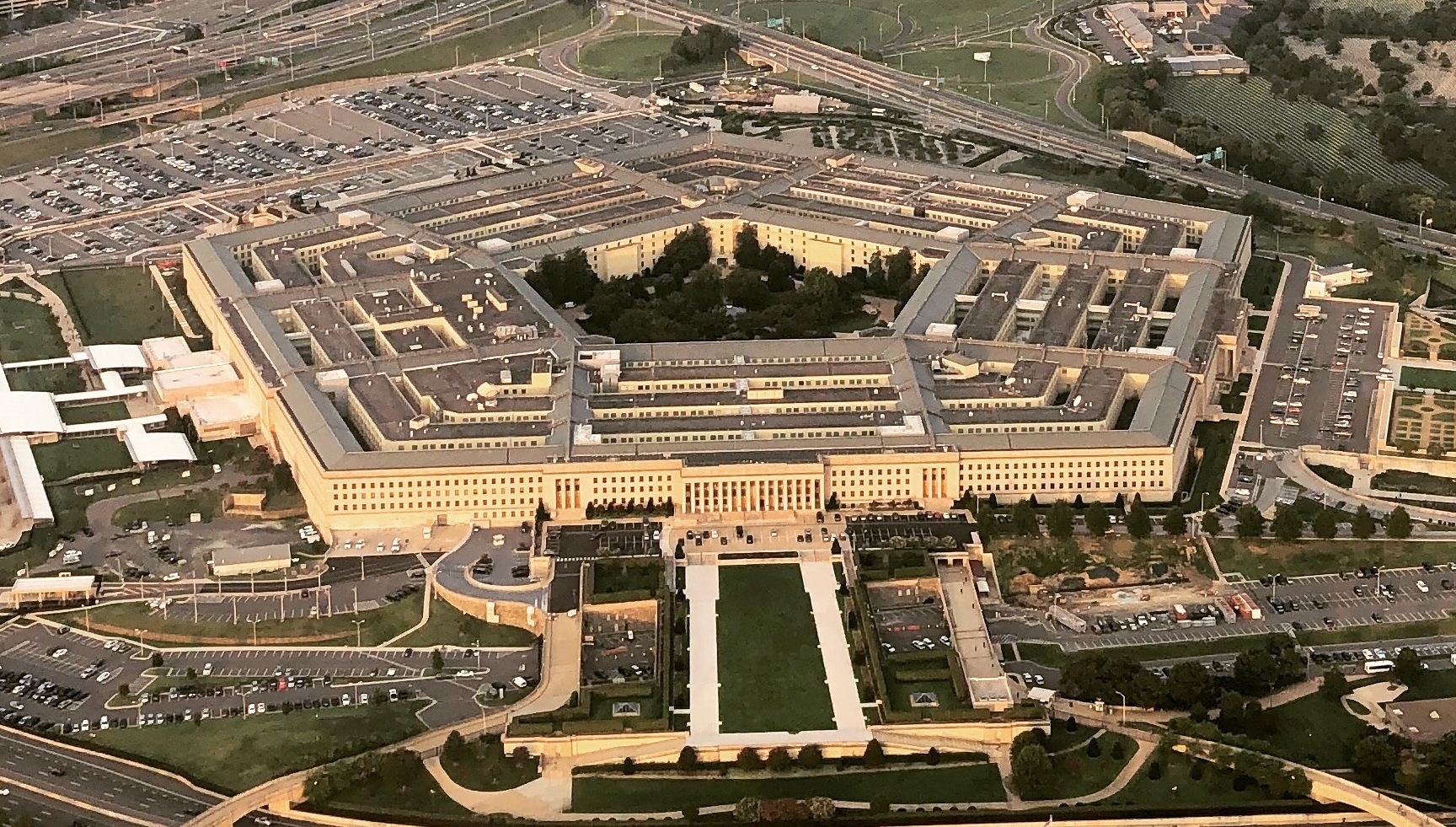
The Pentagon, the headquarters of the United States Department of Defense

The Pentagon pizza theory is the informal observation that spikes in fast food orders, particularly pizza delivery orders, near US government buildings such as The Pentagon, CIA headquarters, and the White House often occur right before a major international crisis.

The theory is also referred to as the pizza meter or the Pentagon pizza index.

== Background ==
In 1990, Frank Meeks, a Domino's franchisee in Washington, told the Los Angeles Times about an extraordinary observation of some unusual late-night deliveries to the Pentagon, CIA and the White House. Meeks had noted that on August 1, the CIA had ordered a one-night record of 21 pizzas, and the following day Iraq invaded Kuwait, starting the Gulf War. At first, Meeks thought it was just a coincidence, but he observed a similar surge in deliveries in December 1998 during the impeachment hearings of Bill Clinton. In response, Wolf Blitzer, CNN's Pentagon correspondent at the time, remarked "Bottom line for journalists: Always monitor the pizzas".

During Operation Neptune Spear—the 2011 raid in which Osama bin Laden was killed—Pentagon Press Secretary George Little described the White House Situation Room as looking "like a college fraternity house" due to the large number of pizza boxes around. The White House team staggered their orders across multiple restaurants and also sent a staffer to pick up food from a Costco so as not to arouse suspicion.

In August 2024, an X account was created known as the "Pentagon Pizza Report" which monitors live visit data on Google Maps in Arlington, though it has no insight on actual order volume or where pizzas are being delivered. The account also cross-references lower traffic with nearby gay bars. In February 2026, Secretary of Defense Pete Hegseth told journalists he was aware of the X account and joked that he had thought about ordering large numbers of pizzas on random nights to “throw everybody off.”

== Examples ==
In 1983 and 1989, surges in pizza orders to the Pentagon were noted by Domino's franchise owner Frank Meeks the night before the US military invasions of Grenada and Panama. On August 1, 1990, the CIA ordered 21 pizzas in a single night ahead of the Iraqi invasion of Kuwait the following morning, which sparked the Gulf War. Meeks claimed that pizza orders in the Washington area also increased prior to the launch of Operation Desert Storm in 1991. In January 1998, immediately after the Clinton–Lewinsky scandal made headlines, Meeks stated that the White House placed $2,600 in orders to Domino's across three days. In December 1998, during the impeachment hearings of Bill Clinton and launch of Operation Desert Fox in Iraq, the White House ordered "32 percent more extra-cheese pizzas than normal", with $11,600 worth of orders in Capitol Hill.

On April 13, 2024, unusually high activity at a Papa John's in Washington D.C., according to observations of Google Maps' popular times graph, coincided with Iran's launch of drones into Israeli territory. On June 12, 2025, at 7 p.m. EDT, the "Pentagon Pizza Report" account noted a "huge surge in activity" in Google's live visit data at the District Pizza Palace, which is two miles (3.2 km) away from the Pentagon. At 8 p.m. EDT, Israel conducted a bombing campaign against Iran, triggering a war between the two countries. Following the bombing, the account also noted "abnormally low traffic" at a gay bar near the Pentagon. On June 22, 2025, at 10:38 p.m. EDT, high levels of activity were reported at a Papa John's two miles from the Pentagon one hour before Donald Trump announced US strikes on Iranian nuclear enrichment facilities.

== Accuracy ==
Zenobia Homan, a senior researcher at the King's College London Centre for Science and Security Studies, responded to the theory with skepticism, pointing out the potential for confirmation bias. Homan stated "I'm not saying [the theory is] wrong, but I want to see way more data. When else do spikes occur? How often do they have absolutely nothing to do with geopolitics?".

In a statement to Newsweek in 2025, the Department of Defense denied the theory, claiming that the Pentagon has numerous internal food vendors that are available to late-night workers. It criticized the accuracy of the timeline provided by the Pentagon Pizza Report.

== See also ==
- Big Mac Index – Economic index published by The Economist
- Pizza Principle – Comparison between the cost of a slice of pizza and a subway ride in New York City
- Waffle House Index – Informal metric to rate disaster severity
