= Pizza Tycoon =

1994 video game

- North American / Australian cover art
- Developer: Cybernetic Corporation
- Publishers: EU: Software 2000; NA: MicroProse; WW: Assemble Entertainment (digital re-release)
- Designers: Stefan Kurth; Thomas Langhanki
- Platforms: Amiga, MS-DOS, Windows, macOS, Linux
- Release: 1994
- Genre: Business simulation
- Modes: Single Player, Multiplayer

Pizza Tycoon (also known as Pizza Connection in Europe) is a business simulation video game. The game was designed by the German company Cybernetic Corporation and Software 2000 in 1994, and was published by Assemble Entertainment after its re-release in 2017. It was published and adapted for the American market by MicroProse with changed artwork and locations.

== Gameplay ==
The game is centered on being the manager of a pizza restaurant in a town in Europe or the U.S. It gives the player the option to choose among more than thirty different characters, to create one's own pizza, have cooking contests and modify the display of the restaurant and kitchen. The player can call upon local mafia to sabotage competitor restaurants or get money from criminal activities such as weapon and drug dealing.

The game displays a playful sense of humor from the graphics and cartoonish drawings, game messages, and animated faces that are put on interacting characters. The original European version ("Pizza Connection") featured a graphical style very similar to MAD artist Don Martin. Microprose's adapted version ("Pizza Tycoon") for the American market distanced itself from this style due to copyright concerns with newly created characters in a different style modeled after famous people as Richard Nixon, Ronald Reagan or Lenin.

== Reception ==
Amiga Joker 2/94 magazine gave Pizza Connection 88 of 100%, Powerplay magazine rated the Amiga version 82 of 100%.

Next Generation reviewed the PC version of the game, rating it four stars out of five, and stated that "Not a game for die hard action fans, but a winner for just about everyone else."

In 1996, Computer Gaming World declared Pizza Tycoon the 34th-worst computer game ever released.

== Legacy ==
Pizza Tycoon (Pizza Connection) was followed by Fast Food Tycoon (Pizza Syndicate), and Fast Food Tycoon 2 (Pizza Connection 2), developed by Software 2000. A fourth game, Pizza Connection 3 was developed by Gentlymad Studios in 2018.

Pizza Connection 1 & 2 were released on GOG.com in January 2017.

In March 2026, Pizza Legacy, an open-source reimplementation of the Pizza Tycoon engine, was released for modern operating systems.

== See also ==
- Transport Tycoon
