= Die Kathedrale =

1991 text adventure game

- Developer: Weltenschmiede
- Publisher: Software 2000
- Programmer: Andreas Niedermeier
- Artists: Harald Evers; Werner Frankowsky (uncredited)
- Writer: Harald Evers
- Platforms: Amiga, MS-DOS
- Release: August 1991
- Genre: Interactive fiction
- Mode: Single-player

Die Kathedrale (English: The Cathedral) is a German interactive fiction game developed by Weltenschmiede and published by Software 2000 in 1991 for Amiga and MS-DOS. Die Kathedrale is part of a trilogy; it is preceded by Das Stundenglas (1990) and succeeded by Hexuma (1992). The trilogy lacks an overarching plot, and the setting, role of the protagonist, and goal differ between each game. Games in the trilogy do not require knowledge of the other entries and may be played as standalone games.

Die Kathedrale was inspired by St. Paul's Church in Munich, Germany. In 1993, Die Kathedrale was adapted into a novel titled Die Kathedrale: Das Geheimnis einer Rache (English: The Cathedral: The Secret of Revenge), and was written by Die Kathedrale's writer Harald Evers.

== Plot ==
The protagonist takes a tour through St. Pauls Kathedrale in the fictional town of Schönau, which is celebrating its 850th anniversary, and in addendum it is the 666th anniversary of the cathedral. There they bump into their former classmate Dani, who is also visiting the cathedral. The cathedral's visiting hours end, and the pair, having lost track of time, are locked inside. They explore the cathedral and discover letters written by Bernardo da Molina, Victor Paz's assistant, dating back to the 15th century. The letters suggest that Victor Paz, the architect of the cathedral, hid fifteen deadly traps in the cathedral to enact revenge on the Catholic Church as a whole, but also specifically against the Bishop Sebastian of Altenburg who murdered one of Paz's relatives under the Inquisition. It is also later revealed that Paz is the half brother of Jan Hus, a historical figure who was burned at the stake for heresy. The protagonist must visit three different years in time, and disarm five of the traps in each era; the three years being 1992, 1881 and 1437. If the protagonist fails to disarm all fifteen traps before the 56 hour time limit, a demon is summoned and kills them, as part of Paz's revenge on the Catholic Church.

== Gameplay ==
There are icons for common inputs, as shown here in the bottom right. Moving the mouse cursor over areas of interest indicates what they are, and that the player may use text commands to interact with them.

Die Kathedrale has 120 images of various locations to accompany the text. Die Kathedrale's backgrounds can be interacted with in the style of a point and click adventure, while interactions with objects are inputted using text commands. In addendum to text commands, Die Kathedrale has a grid of icons for common commands, i.e. ascending or descending stairs and picking up items, and these icons can be clicked to input them. Die Kathedrale has a time limit of 56 in-game hours; after this point, the alternate time zones will become inaccessible and the game will end. Die Kathedrale has 150 different rooms and over 300 pages of text.

The protagonist's friend Dani can sometimes provide input to puzzles, or outright solve them. Dani also asks questions about puzzles to assist in the player's line of thought. Key phrases/topics in dialogue can be clicked to ask characters for further information, or interact with objects, i.e. an object can be inspected or the player may ask Dani for her input on a particular subject.

== Development ==
Die Kathedrale is the second game in a trilogy of text adventure games about time travel by developer Weltenschmiede; Die Kathedrale is preceded by Das Stundenglas (1990) and succeeded by Hexuma (1992). In a 1991 interview with Weltenschmiede, plans for a Die Kathedrale port to an unspecified Atari system were revealed, which was never released. Die Kathedrale's sequel, Hexuma, was being developed at the same time as Die Kathedrale, although late in Die Kathedrale's development. Die Kathedrale was released spanning four floppy disks. According to PC Joker, Amiga Joker, and Aktueller Software Markt, both the Amiga and DOS versions of Die Kathedrale cost 'around 100' Deutschmark in 1991, while Power Play and Play Time list its price as 'around 120' Deutschmark in 1991.

Publisher Software 2000 describes Die Kathedrale as an "Artventure" game due to the addition of graphics to the text adventure format - one of eight games in this range. Die Kathedrale was bundled with feelies, including a poster, blueprints of the cathedral, a brochure detailing the cathedral's history, and copies of letters from the 15th century that can be found in-game. These feelies serve as a form of copy protection as they are referenced in the game and required for puzzles. A hint book for Die Kathedrale was available via mail order.

Die Kathedrale's plot is based in historical fiction, and Harald Evers cites the Inquisition and Christian historical figures such as Jan Hus and John Wycliffe as inspirations. Die Kathedrale was conceived from a suggestion from Elfi Evers, Harald Evers' (née Krüger) future wife, when they visited St. Paul's Church in Munich, Germany. Harald expressed to Elfi that 'he could imagine secrets that the cathedral might hold' and Elfi encouraged him to write about it. An outline for Die Kathedrale was created, and Harald supposedly wrote the rest of the draft for 'ten hours a day for two months until it was complete'.

In a 1991 interview, Das Stundenglas was purported to understand 2500 nouns, 300 verbs, and support many "unimportant" words (although what "unimportant" constitutes is not specified), with Die Kathedrale stated to have "similar" understanding. The ability to click key words in the text is a feature absent in Das Stundenglas, and was added in Die Kathedrale.

== Reception ==
Reception

Review scores
Publication	Score
Amiga Joker	87% (Amiga)
PC Joker	86% (DOS)
Play Time	81% (Amiga)
Aktueller Software Markt	9.4/12 (Amiga)
Power Play	62% (Amiga)

Die Kathedrale was only reviewed in German gaming magazines due to the game only being released in German. Die Kathedrale's native German language text was noted as a positive by reviewers, as German grammar can be complex, i.e. a major difficulty in translating English games into German is that verbs in a sentence are at the end of the sentence in German, rather than being closer to their context as with English. Several magazines noted Die Kathedrale's text and text input as 'more intuitive' than English games that have been translated into German.

Amiga Joker gave the Amiga version of Die Kathedrale an overall score of 87%, calling it "complex" and "the best German text adventure so far" and praised the text adventure format: "The game understands almost any input, and in addition the legibility of the output text is excellent." Amiga Joker noted Die Kathedrale as an improvement over its predecessor, Das Stundenglas, citing improved graphics and 'more interesting' feelies. Amiga Joker also praised the addition of graphical backgrounds, calling them "vibrant & stimulating", but criticized the absence of music aside from the title screen. Amiga Joker praised Die Kathedrale's graphics, gameplay and controls, calling them "very pleasing", and in addition expressing that "you will be blown away by [Die Kathedrale's] opulent features". Amiga Joker noted Die Kathedrale's feelies, praising the "immersive" aged effect of the documents, and stating that "The first thing you notice are the thick and original instructions, which are written like a personal report ... the blueprints of the cathedral are very nice and fit the style [of the game]." In their conclusion, Amiga Joker summarised Die Kathedrale as "an exciting mystery game with an extra portion of fun - excellent for adventurers whom struggle with the English language, an absolute must!"

PC Joker gave the DOS version of Die Kathedrale an overall score of 86%, expressing similar opinions as Amiga Joker's review. PC Joker noted the DOS version as having the same features as the Amiga version, and criticised the lack of sound aside from Die Kathedrale's title screen music. PC Joker praised Die Kathedrale's "atmospheric" graphics, and furthermore praised its feelies, saying that "The game is a hit, and the feelies make it perfect." PC Joker further praises Die Kathedrale's text adventure format, expressing that "while less work to obtain hints is good, a program that understands is better - and here both are true: possible problems with how the game handles German grammar are elegantly circumnavigated, the program understands almost everything, and even if you give it complicated instructions it doesn't stop being accurate." PC Joker summarised Die Kathedrale as "the best German text adventure so far."

Play Time gave the Amiga version of Die Kathedrale an overall score of 81%, praising its historical setting, expressing that "even though the plot [of the game] is made up, the programmers went through a lot of trouble to create small details. Reality and fiction are so expertly blended, that it is difficult to tell what is fantasy and what is real. Anyone who has played this game would be able to find their way around the real St. Pauls Kathedrale in Schönau". Play Time praised Die Kathedrale's 'deviations from the norm' in the text adventure genre, expressing that "The program is completely user-friendly, and also understands complex sentences ... [Die Kathedrale] doesn't handle like a standard text adventure; above the text window there are graphics of a location or an important object." Play Time also praised Die Kathedrale natively being in German.

Power Play gave the Amiga version of Die Kathedrale an overall score of 62%, and was reviewed by two reviewers with differing opinions on the game; Volker Weitz and Boris Schneider-Johne. Power Play praised Die Kathedrale's icons for common commands, stating "[Die Kathedrale has put] the most useful commands that a text adventure player needs to survive together in one grid of icons. One mouse click on the corresponding icon and your character climbs up stairs, takes an item with them or closely inspects a picture." Power Play's Schneider-Johne praised Die Kathedrale's plot and puzzles, but criticized its glitches, expressing that "For a first-class adventure game, there isn't much missing; the story is exciting, the puzzles are well thought through (even though there aren't as many as I would like) and the technical execution is good. There are a few issues that come to light after one or two months of testing: there are mistakes in the text, e.g. exits that are mentioned but don't actually exist, and notable bugs, such as rooms that you can't get out of." Schneider-Johne notes further glitches, such as issues with Die Kathedrale's dialogue, expressing that "The program is quite intelligent but also has some weak spots. For many situations Dani will say something along the lines of "I don't know anything about that" even though she was talking about it seconds earlier. If I hadn't come across these small errors, I would have liked to spend a few more days in the cathedral, since the story intrigues me - I am hoping for a carefully bug-tested MS-DOS release."

Weitz agreed with many of Schneider-Johne's views on Die Kathedrale, but criticized its graphics. Weitz also noted the upcoming release of Die Kathedrale: Das Geheimnis einer Rache, and praised Die Kathedrale's plot: "Sometimes the pictures are drawn, sometimes created digitally - overall, it comes across as inconsistent. The icons also aren't quite lined up and could have used a little more work. What stood out to me was undoubtedly Harald Evers' fantastic story. I excitedly await his first book - he definitely has the material for it. When you enter the cathedral, you will all of a sudden feel like you are in Umberto Eco's The Name of the Rose." Weitz similarly noted glitches, expressing that "If there was a bit more bug testing while programming, Die Kathedrale would be a big hit."

Aktueller Software Markt gave the Amiga version of Die Kathedrale an overall score of 9.4 out of 12, and was reviewed by two reviewers: Klaus Trafford and Michael Anton. Trafford called Die Kathedrale's controls "simply excellent" and praised the amount of content in the game, furthermore praising its "substantial" feelies. Trafford expresses that Die Kathedrale 'understands text commands well', and calls Die Kathedrale a "great game", which "justifies its comparatively high price". Anton compares Die Kathedrale to classic Infocom and Magnetic Scrolls games, expressing that "Similar to how it was in that era, the atmosphere of the game is only in the imagination of the player, and the sound and graphics add very little. If you were hoping for an audio-visual smorgasbord, you will be disappointed – and that sort of player isnt who the game was made for." Anton commended Die Kathedrale's "well thought through" controls, and summarized Die Kathedrale as "a sophisticated adventure-feast for connoisseurs."

== Legacy ==
In 1993, Die Kathedrale's writer Harald Evers published a novel based on the game, Die Kathedrale: Das Geheimnis einer Rache (English: The Cathedral: The Secret of Revenge).
