= Swing (video game) =

1997 video game

- European Game Boy Color box art
- Developer: Software 2000
- Publisher: Software 2000
- Platforms: MS-DOS, Windows, PlayStation, Game Boy Color
- Release: 1997
- Genre: Puzzle
- Modes: Single-player, multiplayer

Swing is a 1997 puzzle video game released for the PlayStation and PC, developed in Germany by the now-defunct Software 2000. The game was released in the US under the name Marble Master. A downgraded version of the game was released for the Game Boy Color.

== Gameplay ==
The object of the game is to score points by dropping balls onto sets of see-saws, in rows of three or more of the same colour. The twist, however, is that each ball has a different weight, determined by the number written on the front of it. The higher the number, the heavier the ball. This means that if a ball is placed onto one side of the see-saw which is heavier than the total value of the balls on the other side, the balance would be upset, sending the top ball flying across the playing field to land on another column. Cascade 'throws' can be achieved, and the game is over if a column reaches too tall. A variety of bonus balls, all with special uses, also feature.

== Reception ==
Official UK PlayStation Magazine gave the game 6 out of 10, calling it "another Tetris clone"; the magazine also described the difficulty as perching "somewhere between the taxing and the brutal."

== Legacy ==
In 1999, a sequel was released: Swing Plus: Total Mind Control. The game was never released outside Germany.

In 2008, a Java open source remake was made named XSwing Plus and released under GPLv2 and CC BY.

In 2015, a remake for Android made in Unity3D was released as Color-X-Plode. One year later it was also released for iOS.
