= Exploration Peak (Nevada) =

Peak in Clark County, Nevada, United States

- Location within Nevada

Highest point
- Elevation: 2,854 ft (870 m)
- Coordinates: 36°00′37″N 115°09′11″W

Geography
- Location: Clark County, Nevada, United States

Climbing
- Easiest route: Exploration Peak Trail

Exploration Peak is a small peak in the unincorporated town of Enterprise, Nevada, United States in the planned community of Mountain's Edge just south of State Route 160 (Blue Diamond Road). It is located within the eponymous Exploration Peak Park.

== Etymology ==
Exploration Peak is named for its proximity to the Old Spanish Trail.

== Hiking and recreation ==
Part of Exploration Peak Park, the peak is easily accessed by two main trails, the 0.9 miles (1.4 km) Exploration Peak Trail and the 1.3 miles (2.1 km) Exploration Peak Loop, and features an overlook at the summit.
