= South Kitsap High School =

Location
- 425 Mitchell Ave; Port Orchard, Washington; United States; 47°32′18″N 122°37′27″W

Information
- Type: Public high school
- Motto: "The strength of the pack is the wolf and the strength of the wolf is the pack."
- Established: 1921
- School district: South Kitsap School District
- Principal: Melissa Super-Greene
- Teaching staff: 121.30 (on an FTE basis)
- Grades: 9–12
- Enrollment: 2,448 (2024-2025)
- Student to teacher ratio: 20.18
- Colors: Maroon, White, and Gold
- Mascot: Wolf
- Yearbook: Rebel (1969-present; formerly Shuhkum)
- Website: http://skhs.skschools.org

South Kitsap High School is a public high school in the South Kitsap School District and is located at 425 Mitchell Ave Port Orchard, Washington. In 2018, the school had the largest student population in the state.

== History and facilities ==
South Kitsap High School was built in 1921. An addition was built in 1962, with modernization projects in 1978 and 1980. The 337,392 square foot (31,300 m²) building is located on a 51.46-acre site.

== Band ==
The school is known for its marching band, The Marching Machine. In October 2008, the band was invited to march in the 2010 Tournament of Rose Parade in Pasadena, California. The band was one of 16 bands selected to perform. Gov. Christine Gregoire proclaimed Tuesday, January 26, 2010 South Kitsap High School Marching Band Day. Gregoire signed the proclamation Jan. 8 in honor of the band’s performance in the 2010 Rose Parade in Pasadena, Calif.

The band was also selected to perform in the Pearl Harbor Memorial Parade & Salute on December 7, 2011 in Honolulu, Hawaii. The event marked the 70th anniversary of the Japanese attack on Pearl Harbor during World War II.

The band was a $10,000 grand-prize winner of the "Schools of the Rock Battle of the Bands," put on by Rock Wood Fired Pizza and Spirits, Seattle radio station KZOK and Xfinity in 2011. The SKHS band was selected over 27 other contestants, including Kingston High School, a school rival.

== Choir ==
In 2008 the school's chamber choir famously performed a visual form of Handel's "Hallelujah" chorus. The video went viral, with more than 21 million views by December 2020.

== Notable alumni ==
- Willie Bloomquist, Major League Baseball player
- Aaron Cunningham, MLB outfielder for the San Diego Padres
- Jason Ellison, MLB outfielder
- Jamie Ford, New York Times bestselling author of Hotel on the Corner of Bitter and Sweet
- Jason Hammel, MLB pitcher for the Colorado Rockies
- Jud Heathcote, basketball coach at Michigan State and Montana
- Princess Salwa Aga Khan (née Kendra Spears), American fashion model and ex-wife of Prince Rahim Aga Khan
- Zoe McLellan, actress
- Benji Olson, NFL player
- Andrew Peterson, former NFL player for the Carolina Panthers
- Emily Randall, U.S. representative for Washington's 6th congressional district, former Washington State Senator
- Sean Spencer, former MLB pitcher
