= Fast Food Tycoon 2 =

2001 video game

- Developer: Software 2000
- Publishers: ^{NA} Activision Value Publishing^{EU} Software 2000^{WW} Assemble Entertainment (digital re-release)
- Platform: Windows
- Release: NA: October 9, 2001; EU: February 2, 2001
- Genre: Business simulation game
- Mode: Single player

Fast Food Tycoon 2, also known as Pizza Connection 2 in Europe, is a business simulation game on the PC in which the player starts out as the owner of a small pizza parlor and must gain popularity and eventually own the pizza empire. A sequel of Fast Food Tycoon, Fast Food Tycoon 2 incorporates a variety of variables of which the player must overcome to reach unique goals in 10 different international cities, ranging from New York City to Moscow to Tokyo. A sequel, Pizza Connection 3, was slated for 2018 release.
