= Explorations Academy =

School in Washington, United States

Coordinates: 48°45′10″N 122°28′21″W

Information
- Former name: Explorations High School
- Established: 1995; 31 years ago
- Website: explorationsacademy.org

Explorations Academy is an independent school in Bellingham, Washington, United States that integrates experiential education with academic studies. The school was founded in 1995 as a program of the not-for-profit educational organization Global Community Institute.

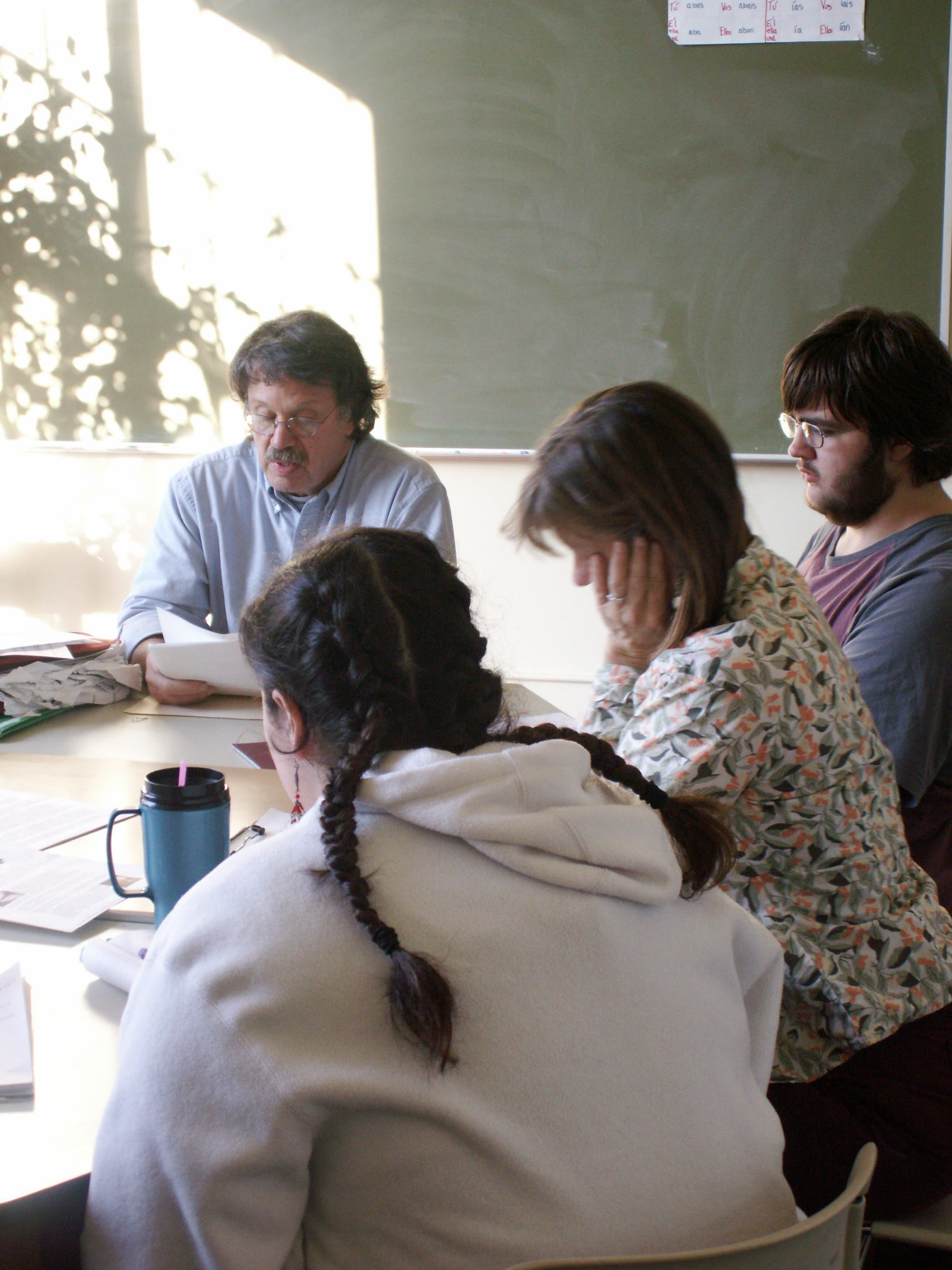
An in-depth discussion in Social Issues class

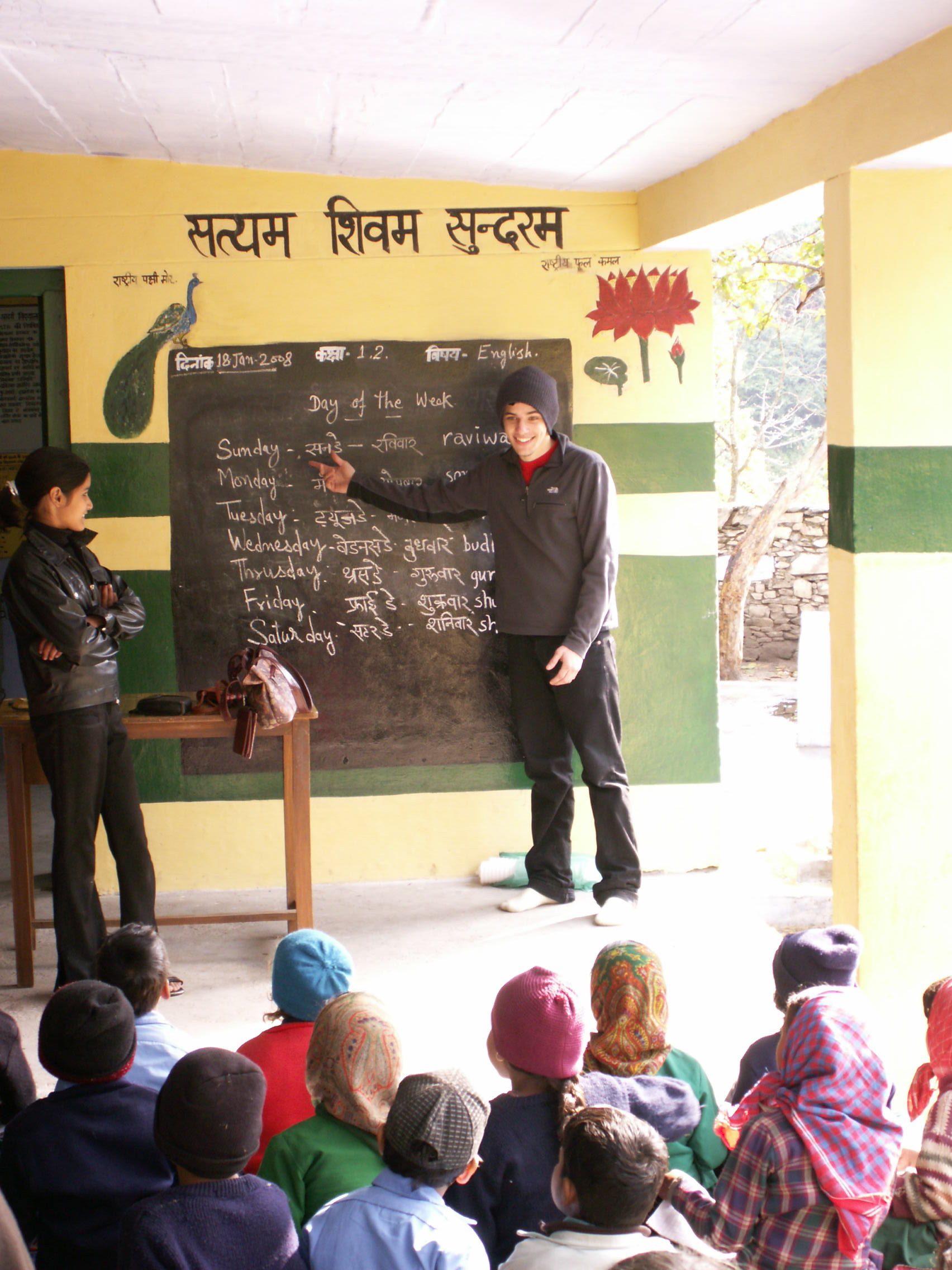
An Explorations student teaches English in India

== Explorations Academy curriculum ==
The Explorations curriculum is built around theme-based interdisciplinary units called clusters. Each cluster includes college-preparatory academic coursework in three to five subject areas. Students study fine arts, foreign language, PE, and occupational education in addition to the core academic subjects. Coursework typically includes study, lecture, and discussion in class as well as field outings to investigate the applications of academic learning. In keeping with preparation for college, the school's program is reading and writing intensive, with a high degree of individual student responsibility.

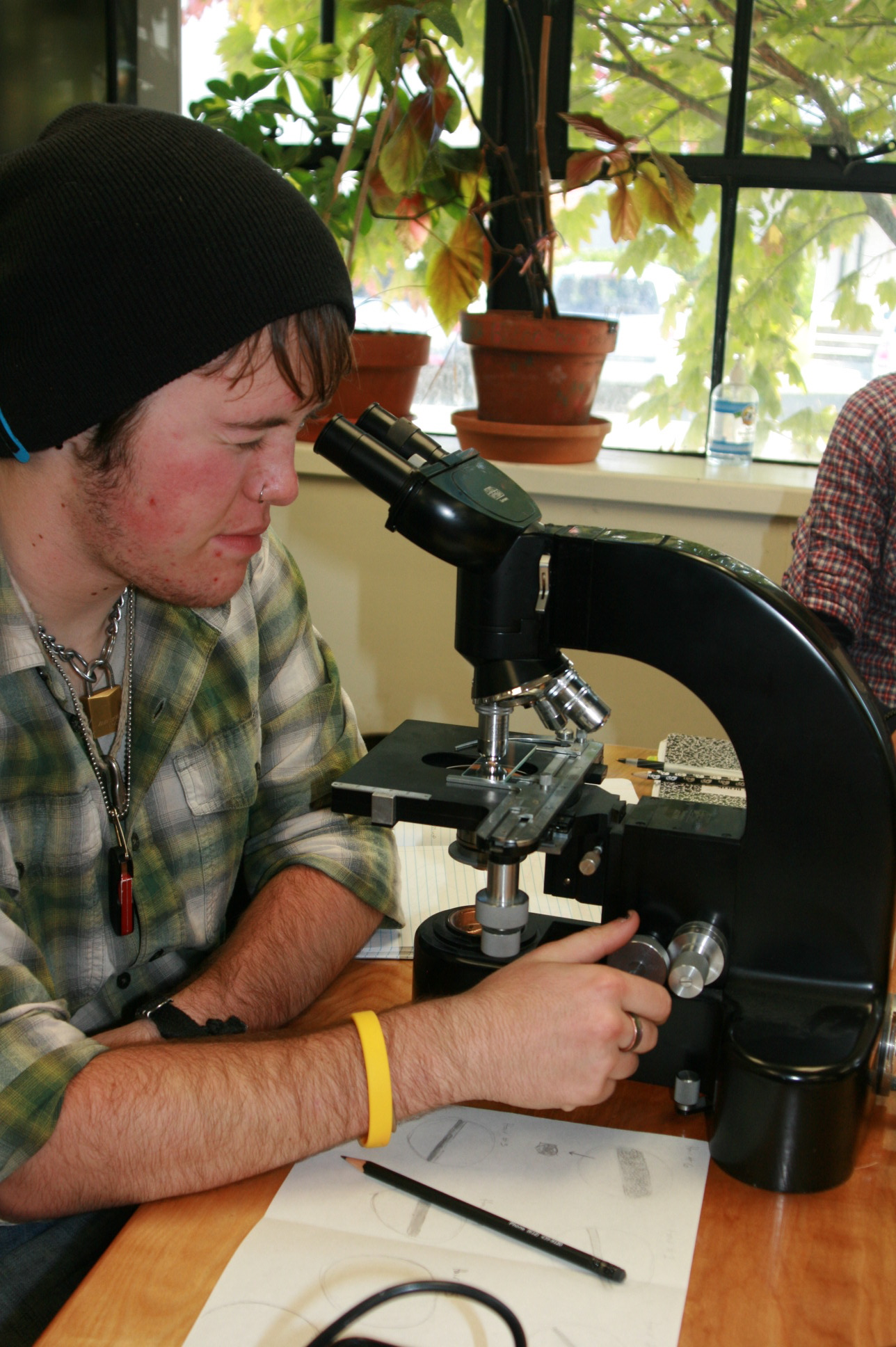
An Explorations student looks at hair under a microscope in Forensics class

== History ==
In 1986, three friends who had been instructors for Pacific Crest Outward Bound School, talked about creating an experiential school in their home town of Bellingham, Washington. They realized that to get funding, they would need to ask for donations, and they started a 501(c)3 non-profit educational organization, Global Community Institute, to shepherd in the school that would emerge several years later. After running several pilot programs, the last being in the spring of 1995, Explorations High School was launched in the fall later that year. A couple of years later, the school was renamed Explorations Academy to reflect the addition of a middle school.
