= World Discoverer =

1974 German cruise ship, abandoned 2000

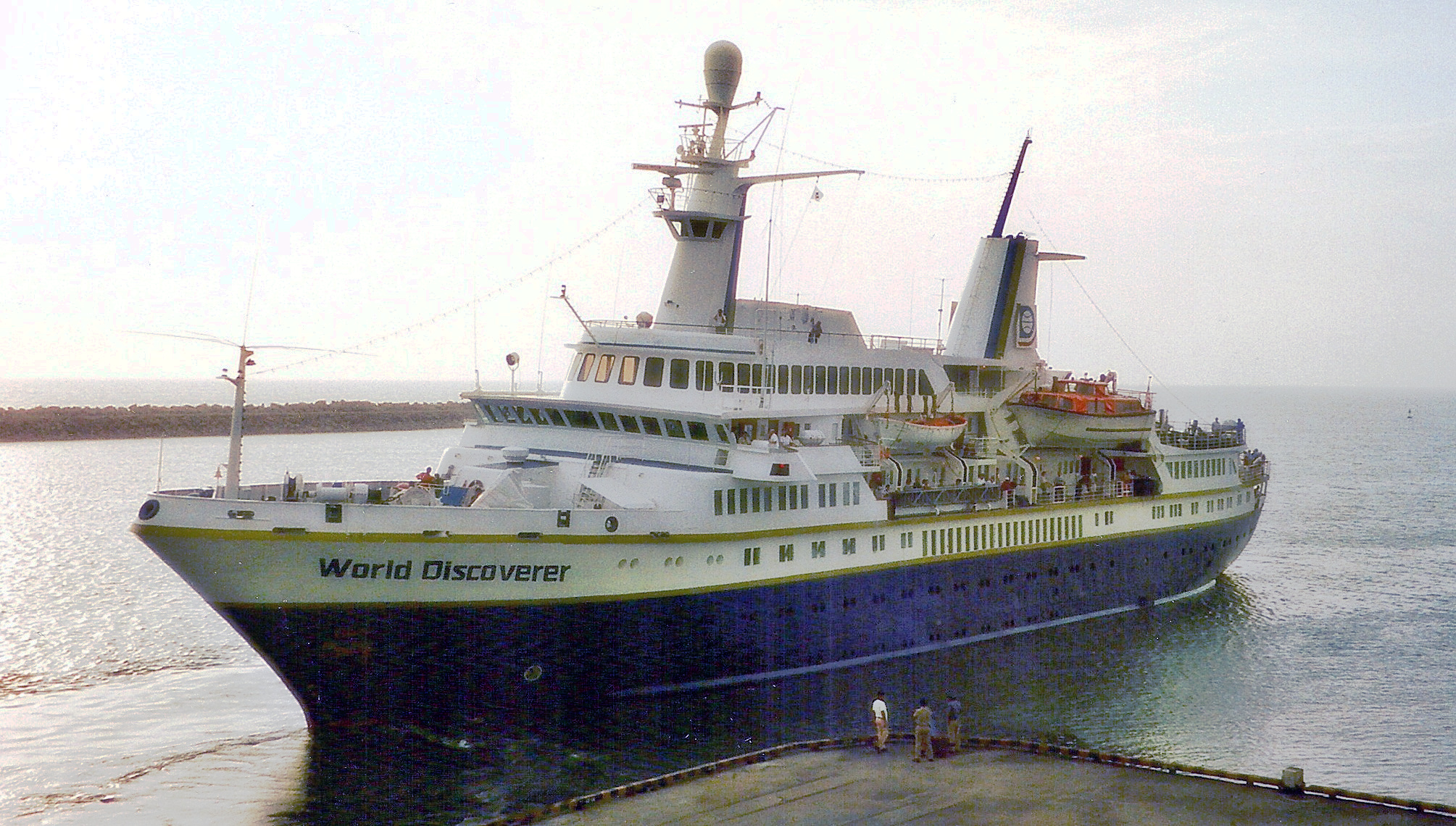
- World Discoverer in Salaverry in October 1993

History
- Name: World Discoverer (1975–2000)
- Owner: BEWA Cruises (Denmark) (1974–1976); Adventurer Cruises (1976–1987); Society Expeditions (1987–2000)
- Port of registry: 1975–1976: Copenhagen (Denmark); 1976–1980: Singapore; 1980–2000: Monrovia (Liberia)
- Yard number: 2250
- Launched: 8 December 1973
- Completed: 19 October 1975
- Refit: 1996
- Identification: Call sign: ELDU3; IMO number: 7349053
- Fate: Wrecked 30 April 2000 after striking an uncharted reef in the Sandfly Passage

General characteristics
- Type: Cruise ship
- Tonnage: 3,724 GT
- Length: 87.51 m (287 ft 1 in)
- Beam: 15.12 m (49 ft 7 in)
- Draft: 4.4 m (14 ft)
- Depth: 8.72 m (28.6 ft)
- Decks: 7
- Installed power: 2 × MaK 8M452AK (2 × 1,760 kW)
- Propulsion: Single propeller
- Speed: 16.5 knots (30.6 km/h; 19.0 mph)
- Capacity: 137 passengers in 76 cabins
- Crew: 75 to 80

Wreck site
- Interactive map of Wreck site
- Coordinates: 9°01′23.17″S 160°07′22.91″E
- Country: Solomon Islands

World Discoverer was a cruise ship designed for and built by Schichau Unterweser, Germany in 1974. During construction called BEWA Discoverer, the ship was completed in Bremerhaven, Germany. In 2000, the ship struck an underwater obstacle and was damaged; it was subsequently grounded to prevent sinking and abandoned in the Solomon Islands. To this date the local community has requested assistance from an environmental protection agency to assist with the clean up, and it has been refused. Further they tried to get the ship removed, or get compensated for it, but have received nothing to date. They were advised that they were time barred in their claim.

== History ==
The vessel was originally built as the BEWA Discoverer in 1974. The ship was sold to Denmark’s BEWA Cruises. The ship was renamed "Lowell Thomas Discoverer" and ran 7-day Great Lakes Chicago to Montreal (and the reverse) St. Lawrence Seaway cruises. In July 1976, the vessel was sold to Adventure Cruises and was renamed World Discoverer. There was also a sister ship that is believed to be still afloat. The ship also became a long-term charter to Society Expeditions. In 1976, the ship was registered in Singapore. In 1987, Society Expedition came under new ownership and was renamed Society Expedition, with offices in Seattle, United States and Germany. The new owner of the ship was Discoverer Reederei who also has ownership of other vessels, such as MV Explorer. In 1990, she was registered in Liberia, once again under the name World Discoverer. The vessel had a double hull construction, allowing for periodic voyages to the Antarctic polar regions to allow its passengers to observe ice floe movements and providing protection for minor impacts. In 1996, the ship was refurbished still called, World Discoverer. The ship carried a fleet of inflatable dinghies, allowing passengers to move closer to ice floes for observation.

== Service history ==
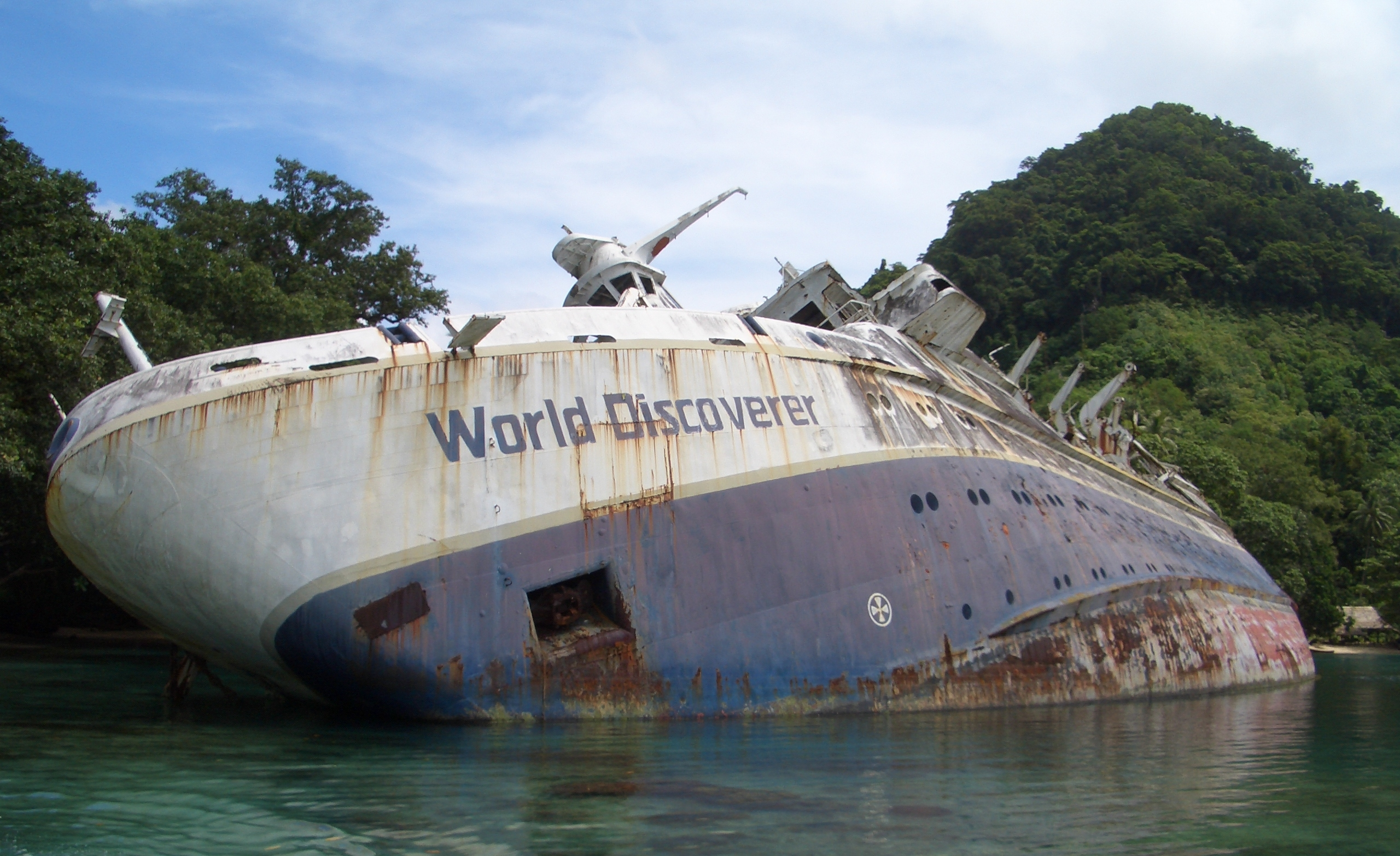
Wreck of World Discoverer in July 2007

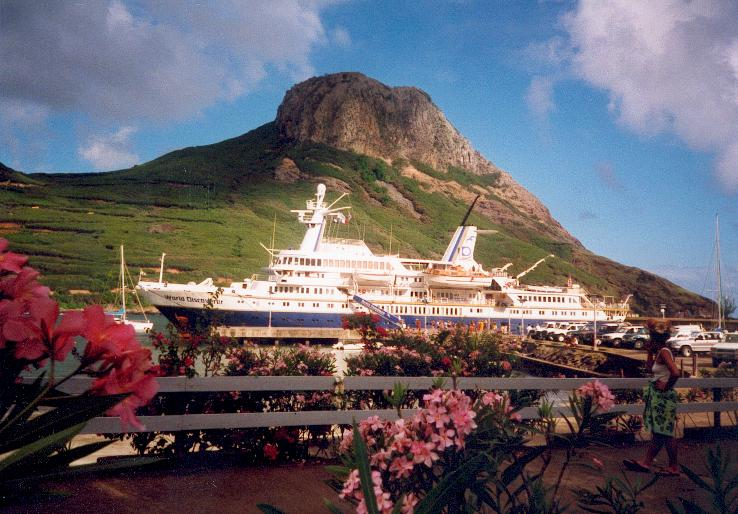
World Discoverer at port in Ua Pou

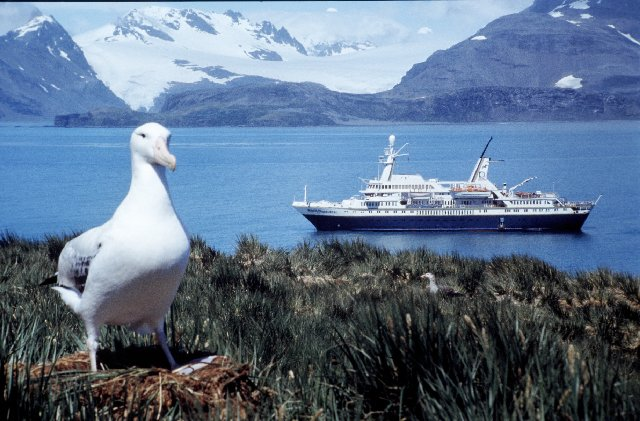
World Discoverer anchored in South Georgia

During the period from November through February (Austral summer), the ship conducted cruises in the Southern Hemisphere and visited places like Antarctica, the Falkland Islands, Chile and Argentina. From March to May and August to October, the ship cruised the South Pacific Islands. Between the months of June and August, the ship cruised around the Alaskan region and also the Russian border around the Bering Sea. World Discoverer was classified as a Swedish/Finnish 1A Ice Class, allowing the ship to withstand minor floe impacts. The World Discoverer also had a 13,000 km (8,100 mi) cruising range, allowing the ship to travel the Northwest Passage.

The ship was captained by Oliver Krüss, who had previously crewed as chief mate. Society Expeditions also hired a small team of experienced expedition leaders to answer tourist questions concerning the region, ice floes, their movements, and the ship's destinations. A small fleet of dinghies landed passengers on various shorelines for observation of local wildlife in the area. Each day comprised typically two to three shore expeditions, led by geologists, historians, naturalists, and marine biologists. The ship was equipped with an observation lounge, medical center with an active physician, library, sun deck with a small swimming pool, small fitness center and a lecture hall with cinema projector.

== Wreck ==
On 30 April 2000, at 16:00 local time, the ship struck a large uncharted rock or reef in the Sandfly Passage, Solomon Islands. Captain Krüss sent a distress signal, which was received in Honiara, the Solomon Islands' capital city. A passenger ferry was dispatched to the ship and all passengers were then transported to safety. The captain then brought the ship into Roderick Bay after the ship began to list 20 degrees and grounded it to avoid sinking. After underwater surveying of the ship, World Discoverer was declared a constructive total loss. The ship has remained in Roderick Bay ever since.

Michael Lomax, president of Society Expeditions, congratulated the captain and crew for their heroic and professional actions, saying that they performed in an "exemplary manner" during the crisis. The ship was scheduled to have its annual dry-dock inspection on 11 May when annual maintenance work would have been completed. Also planned were two additional suites on the boat deck and the installation of a new fire protection system throughout the ship.

== Aftermath ==
World Discoverer still sits in Roderick Bay of the Nggela Islands with a 46° list. The closest salvage companies, stationed in Australia, found the ship ransacked by locals and other factions. The Solomon Islands were undergoing civil war at the time. Tidal activity damaged the ship even more. The ship has been sustaining surface rusting with many of the windows removed. The ship became a tourist attraction with the locals of the island as well as other cruise lines that pass by World Discoverer, including Princess II. A salvage was attempted in 2000 but "abandoned after shots were exchanged with the local tribe."

In the aftermath of the wreck, Society Expedition refurbished an ice-class vessel and called it World Discoverer. It launched in 2002, resuming cruises. Society Expedition ceased operations in June 2004 after their new vessel was seized by creditors in Nome, Alaska. Two weeks later, it filed for chapter 7 liquidation bankruptcy. After further name changes, the later ship then operated as Silver Explorer until it was sold.
