= Explorations (TV series) =

- Countries of origin: United Kingdom; United States
- Original language: English
- No. of seasons: 3
- No. of episodes: 32

Production
- Camera setup: Multi-camera
- Running time: 53 minutes

Original release
- Network: National Geographic Channel; BBC World
- Release: September 2003 – September 2004

Explorations is a documentary television series that looks into the many aspects of the human life with science, technology and research.

Three series have been broadcast.

Series 1 – 6 x 1hr, Series 2 – 13 x 1/2hr, Series 3 – 13 x 1/2hr.

It is an example of "advertiser funded programming", where Duracell funded the cost of production of the series, produced by Broadcast Marketing Ltd, London. Executive Producers for Broadcast Marketing, Bill Orde and Peter Telford.

The second series mainly focuses on daily life, ranging from food to fear to love. It provides interesting information and fact that usually do not come to people's minds, such as:

- How food changes the chemistry of the brain, affecting one's mood and ability to achieve. ("Mood Food")
- The factors that cause attraction - Body shape, symmetry of a person's face and movement of a person. ("First Impressions")
- How short-term stress can save one's life, and how long-term stress can be a slow and potential killer. ("Stressed")
- The origins of phobia, how people react when they confront their fears head-on. ("Primal Fear")

The first and the second series were broadcast in September 2003 and September 2004, respectively. The documentary is broadcast on the National Geographic Channel in the United States, BBC World, and cable/terrestrial channels elsewhere around the world. It is produced jointly by BBC Worldwide Ltd and Broadcast Marketing Ltd, United Kingdom.
