= Discovery (fireboat) =

US fireboat operating in the Columbia River

History

United States
- Name: Discovery
- Operator: Vancouver Fire Department
- Builder: Munson Marine
- Cost: $1,597,000
- Completed: April 2015
- Commissioned: 16 May 2014

General characteristics
- Type: Fireboat
- Length: 46 feet (14 m)
- Speed: 35 miles per hour (56 km/h)
- Capacity: Water Pumping Capacity; 3,000 US gal (11,360 L; 2,498 imp gal) per minute
- Complement: 3
- Crew: 3
- Time to activate: variable- crew not housed at vessel

Discovery is a fireboat launched on the Columbia River in 2014. The Discovery is operated by the Vancouver Fire Department. The vessel can pump 3,000 US gal/min (11,000 L/min) for firefighting, and is the city's first dedicated fireboat.

She was purchased through a port security grant from the Federal Emergency Management Agency. The $2.7 million grant was shared with the Fire Department of nearby Astoria, Oregon, and Clark County Fire & Rescue.

In 2002 a Washington Survey and Review Bureau evaluation reported that Vancouver maritime commerce was well above the size where the city needed a dedicated fireboat. The publication of the report triggered an increase in local insurance rates. The FEMA research paper Marine Response Vessel Use and Design Assessment recommended that Vancouver's fireboat should have a minimum pumping capacity of at least 5,000 US gal/min (19,000 L/min).

== Operation ==
In addition to her fire-fighting capability the vessel is equipped with infrared sensors to support search and rescue missions. In her cabin there is a decontamination station as well as facilities for providing emergency medical care and transportation. She is equipped with equipment to contain oil and other hazardous material spills. In addition, she was designed to be of use in the event of natural or man-made disasters, like earthquakes, or terrorist attacks.

The Discovery is available to respond anywhere on the Columbia River system. (when staffed) Vancouver Fire responded to 22 maritime incidents in 2024.

The Discovery is not staffed full time. She operates with a minimum crew of 3- pilot, deckhand and rescue swimmer. In normal circumstances, this crew is assigned to a "marine engine company" in town, which must respond several miles to reach the Discovery for an emergency response. If that engine company is committed to an incident, or if the engine crew on a given day does not contain the requisite pilot, deckhand and swimmer, the Discovery cannot operate and won't be dispatched.
