= Explorations V Children's Museum =

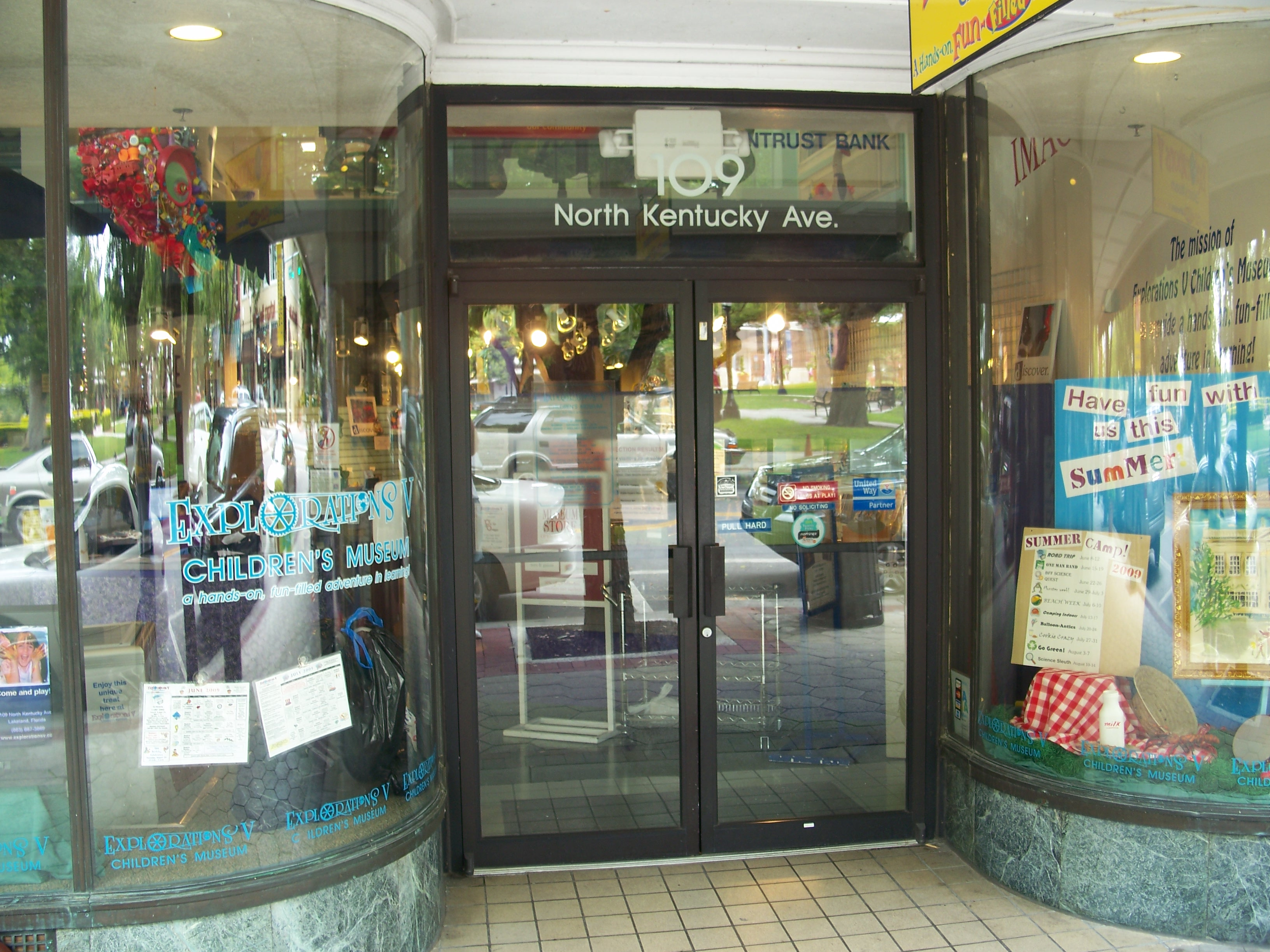
- Established: 1991
- Location: 109 N. Kentucky Avenue; Lakeland, Florida
- Coordinates: 28.04453°N 81.95498°W
- Type: Children's museum
- Website: explorationsv.com

Explorations V Children's Museum is an independent, non-profit 501(c)(3) children's museum in downtown Lakeland, Florida.

== History ==
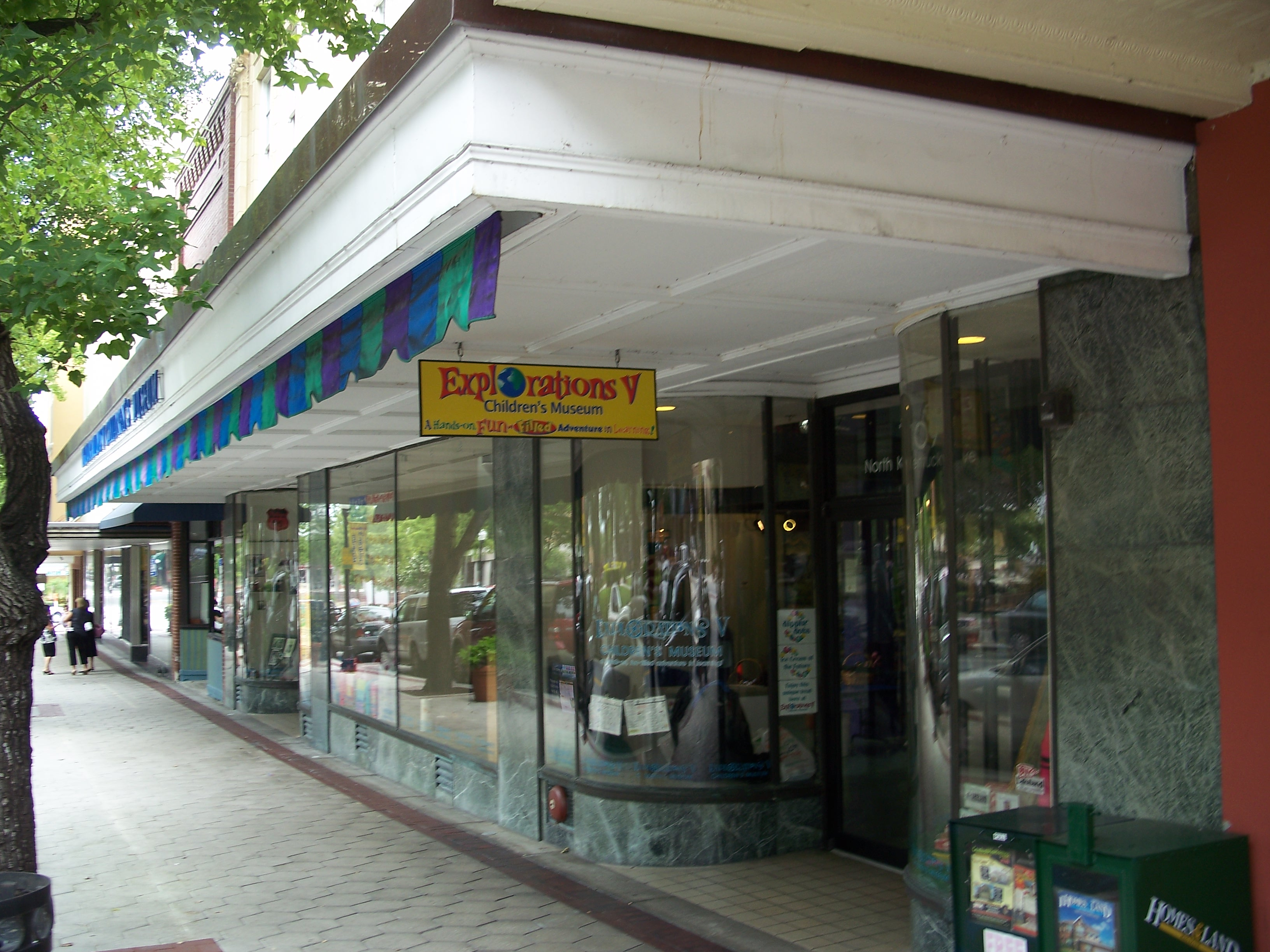

Founded in July 1991 by parent volunteers, the museum moved from its original location into the four-story historic Kress building in 1999. The Museum has also built an additional building, which serves as the anchor institution of the new Bonnet Springs Park in Lakeland. It will include new exhibits scheduled to open at the end of 2022.

== Exhibits ==
=== Our Town ===
The first floor features vocabulary-rich exhibits with a theme of "Our Town" which allow children to appreciate the basics of music appreciation, art, theater, math, science, and history. The exhibit areas include a doctor's office, sheriff's car, fire truck, theater, maker space, news station, Space Shuttle, airplane, school and grocery store.

=== "O’ is for Oranges, From Seed to Our World” ===
The lower floor exhibits introduce children to local history and the world through an interactive orange factory and cultural displays. Exhibits include an orange grove, tree house, truck, stand, juice factory. Additional exhibits include Fossils of Florida and International Impressions of Africa, Asia, Australia and America.

=== Other exhibits ===
The second floor features early science interactives, a small children's art gallery, and program/party rooms which host daily programs, field trip workshops, and out-of-school/after-school camps.

== Programs and activities ==
Daily in-house programs promote skills necessary for academic readiness and advancement, social problem solving, self-control, fine and gross motor skills, and creative expression. The museum also conducts off-site programs, like the free weekly program at Family Fundamentals, a center for the working uninsured. All exhibits and programs complement Florida Sunshine State Standards and Common Core Standards.

Explorations V is a teacher-approved field trip destination for several school districts and attracts home-school families, daycare centers, scouts, teen parent programs, and boys and girls celebrating birthdays.

The Museum offers financial education classes for families in partnership with United Way and local banks, the program help families learn about and achieve financial stability.

United Way's Family Fundamentals is housed on site.
