= USC&GS Discoverer =

USC&GS Discoverer was the name of two ships of the United States Coast and Geodetic Survey, and may refer to:

- USC&GS Discoverer (1918), a survey ship in service from 1922 to 1941
- USC&GS Discoverer, an oceanographic research ship in service in the Coast and Geodetic Survey from 1967 to 1970 and in the National Oceanic and Atmospheric Administration as NOAAS Discoverer (R 102) from 1970 to 1996
