= Discovery (Canadian TV series) =

- Genre: Documentary
- Country of origin: Canada
- Original language: English
- No. of seasons: 1

Production
- Executive producer: Philip Keatley
- Production location: Vancouver
- Running time: 30 minutes

Original release
- Network: CBC Television
- Release: 7 January 1962 – 29 September 1963

Discovery is a Canadian documentary television series that aired on CBC Television from 1962 to 1963.

== Premise ==
This Vancouver-produced series of documentaries often concerned western Canadian topics with some episodes on subjects outside Canada.

The first series run in early 1962 featured a three-part documentary on the Spanish Civil War (Alex Pratt producer, George Woodcock writer). In March 1962, the three-part "Here Be Giants" (Michael Rothery, producer) featured the explorations of Bering and Mackenzie through the Arctic and western Canadian regions.

Later in 1962, another series run featured "Victoria 100" (George Robertson producer and writer) on the centennial of the British Columbia capital, and a two-part documentary about the Rhodes Scholarships (Alex Pratt producer, William McCarthy writer).

Discovery's final run was in mid-1963 where topics included Canadian architecture, Samuel Baker's expeditions through the Nile, the early history of Canadian bush pilots, medical research for space, physical fitness and the Wright brothers efforts to develop man-made flight.

== Scheduling ==
This first run of this half-hour series was broadcast on Sundays at 4:30 p.m. (Eastern) from 7 January to 25 March 1962. The next run was scheduled as a mid-year replacement program on Saturdays at 10:30 p.m. from 4 August to 29 September 1962. Its final run was again a replacement between seasons, Sundays 10:30 p.m. from 30 June to 29 September 1963.
