= Vancouver Fire Department (Washington) =

Fire department of Vancouver, Washington, U.S.

Operational area
- Country: United States
- State: Washington
- City: Vancouver

Agency overview
- Established: January 1, 1867
- Annual calls: 39,907+ (2026)
- Employees: 277 (245 suppression)(2025)
- Annual budget: $8,982,752 (2025)
- Staffing: Career
- Fire chief: John L. Drake II
- IAFF: 452

Facilities and equipment
- Battalions: 2
- Stations: 11
- Engines: 11
- Trucks: 3
- Squads: 3- type 6
- Tenders: 3
- HAZMAT: 1
- USAR: 1
- Wildland: 2 - type 6
- Fireboats: 1
- Light and air: 1

Website
- Official website
- IAFF website

The Vancouver Fire Department (VFD) provides fire protection and emergency medical services to the city of Vancouver and, by contract to Clark County Fire District 5, in Washington, United States. The VFD's response area is 89.2 square miles (231 km^{2}) with a population of over 301,529. The VFD has the highest call volume per firefighter in the state. ALS transport (advanced life support, or paramedic-staffed) is provided by AMR, making the VFD's service area population by far the largest in Western Washington without public ALS ambulance service.

== History ==
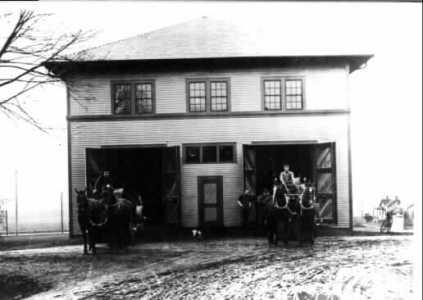
Horse-drawn fire engines of the Vancouver, Washington Fire Department.

The Vancouver Fire Department (VFD) was officially founded on January 1, 1867, by means of an ordinance passed by the City Council. The motivation for the formation of the department came in August 1866 when a fire started in a furniture store and, in less than an hour, destroyed eight buildings.

== Operations ==
=== Fire and EMS Response ===
An engine company is the standard multi-purpose response resource for each of the 11 VFD stations. Engines carry water, hose, a full complement of emergency medical equipment, as well as a variety of other tools and equipment.

In addition, the VFD operates 3 truck (aka ladder truck) companies that are housed alongside engine companies. VFD truck companies carry a full complement of ground ladders and a 100 ft. aerial ladder, along with other structure-fire-specific tools. They are also the primary technical rescue companies, carrying patient extrication equipment, forcible entry equipment, and other special equipment. Current VFD trucks are tractor-drawn aerials (TDAs) and do not carry water.

VFD engine companies are always staffed with 3 members minimum, and truck companies are always staffed with 4 members minimum. Each engine company and truck company is operated by an Apparatus Engineer and supervised by a Captain (who are both counted as part of that 3 or 4 person team)

Three 2-person squads are in service at Stations 1, 5, and 6. These are light, fast, multi-purpose companies staffed in addition to (independent of) the other companies housed with them: They are Type 6 wildland engines that also carry ALS medical gear. One of the results of Proposition 2's funding increase, they are intended to improve response times and reduce wear-and-tear on the larger and heavier engines with which they share quarters.

All VFD engine companies, squads and truck companies operate at the Advanced Life Support (ALS, or paramedic) level at all times. Every VFD firefighter, Apparatus Engineer, Captain and Battalion Chief (BC) is certified to either the EMT-Basic or EMT-Paramedic level. The department's daily minimum on-duty staffing is 53, including 2 BCs. 80% of the department's annual call volume is EMS-related. Because of the geographic distribution of VFD fire stations (usually affording far quicker response times than AMR), the fire companies provide primary ALS assessment and treatment until the AMR transport ambulance arrives.

All staffed VFD companies (and most of the other fire companies in Clark County) are dispatched via AVL (Automatic Vehicle Location), a GPS-based feature of the regional computer-aided dispatch (CAD) system. The closest company(s) of a CAD-recommended type is automatically sent to an incident, regardless of jurisdiction. (CRESA 911 is the PSAP and dispatch agency for the VFD, the remainder of Clark County, and portions of Cowlitz and Skamania Counties)

Vancouver's heavy rescue, hazardous materials, fire boat, rehab and air apparatus, as well as all water tenders and brush engines, are not normally staffed. They can be cross-staffed by their co-housed engine or truck crew when needed. (Exception- Fireboat 1 is housed on the Columbia River, several miles distant from Engine 3, the company that responds to staff it)

The combined City of Vancouver/Fire District 5 response area is split into two geographic battalions (Battalion 1: East, Battalion 2: West). Each battalion is managed by a BC working the same 4-platoon schedule as Firefighters and Captains. At present, each BC supervises 5 or 6 stations and their respective companies.

A BC serves as the incident commander (IC) for all complex, multi-company operations. Both BCs respond to every structure fire incident to fill IC and other roles. A BC also normally responds with Vancouver companies that are dispatched to complex incidents outside of the VFD response area. They provide additional command staff assistance at those incidents.

For very large incidents, the VFD can request the Vancouver Police Department (VPD) mobile command post vehicle. VPD's acquisition of this asset allowed the VFD to discontinue maintenance and operation of its own command post vehicle.

In addition to their regular duties, at least one Training Captain responds to structure fires and other complex scenes to serve as the Incident Safety Officer (ISO).

Definitions/Terminology/Active Incidents:

"Apparatus"-Apparatus normally refers to an unstaffed vehicle, such as an engine, truck, or squad apparatus.

"Company"-Company normally refers to an apparatus combined with the team of firefighters assigned to it. Therefore, "Engine 2" represents the engine Company and its assigned Captain and firefighters based at Fire Station 2. Even if the apparatus is a different machine- a temporary reserve or "spare" engine, the company will still be dispatched and will respond as "Engine 2." Reserve apparatus accommodate changeable placards, kept at each station, that properly display company designators for this reason.

Alarm levels: Each incident type has a specific number of pre-determined resources assigned to it in the 911 dispatch system. Most EMS incidents require just the closest engine, squad, or truck company. But for an incident at which CPR is in progress, the two closest companies would be dispatched. A room-and-contents house fire is normally assigned three engines, one truck, one squad, and two BCs. If the size and complexity of the incident is determined to exceed what was originally reported, the IC may request that CRESA 911 upgrade the incident to a 2-alarm fire. The resulting "second alarm" dispatch will send essentially another set of companies mirroring the first (initial) alarm, in this case, 3 more engines and another truck. A large commercial building gets more companies initially, and a second alarm at the same address would get a commensurately larger set of additional companies.

Active Incidents on PULSE POINT: The Pulse Point CPR app's CAD viewer feature can be used to see active and recent fire and EMS incidents in Vancouver and all of Clark County. It monitors CRESA's CAD system, but is not an emergency alert tool for anything other than CPR incidents in public places. Vancouver companies are numbered from 1-19. The designators are as follows for all of Clark County: E-engine; T-truck; SQ-squad; BC- battalion chief; HR- heavy rescue; M-paramedic ambulance; B-brush; WT- water tender; TRN-training captain; TRT-tech rescue; HM- Haz Mat; FM-fire marshal/investigator; C- chief; 19Ax- County FM/fire investigator.

The radio feature available in Pulse Point is flawed as currently set up-it freely mixes CRESA's Fire Tap, Fire Comm, Ops (incident) channels, and the totally separate WSP dispatch and AMR dispatch. (AMR ambulances are not dispatched by CRESA or shown on the CAD viewer, and no purely law enforcement agency units or incidents are shown)

=== Specialty Teams ===
Technical Rescue: The Heavy Rescue 5 apparatus and a Clark Co. FD 6 multi-purpose vehicle (TRT 61) make up the Clark County Technical Rescue Team fleet. The team is composed of members from both departments, as well as from other agencies within Clark County. HR5 can be cross-staffed by members of Engine 5 and/or Truck 5 (when available) for initial deployment. This team is a regional asset.

Hazardous Materials: Engine 10 serves as the on-duty HazMat company for emergency consultation (in addition to its normal fire/EMS duties). The special-purpose HazMat 10 and Foam 10 are not staffed, but are usually part of a team deployment. The team must be assembled for a full mobilization, with most members coming from home (paged off-duty). This can take 1 hour or more. This team is a regional asset.

=== Fireboat ===
In May 2014, the VFD launched the Discovery, a 46 feet (14 m) quick response fireboat. This vessel was specially designed for all-season fire and rescue duty on the Columbia River. It can operate in very shallow water, and can beach itself like a landing craft when necessary. The fireboat was paid for through a port security grant from the Federal Emergency Management Agency. Normally FEMA matches funds raised locally on a three to one basis, but, in Vancouver's case, FEMA waived the requirement for a local contribution to the capital costs, and paid the entire $1.6 million costs itself.

== Labor Groups ==
Firefighters, captains, battalion chiefs and division chiefs are represented by "Vancouver Firefighters Local 452" of the International Association of Firefighters.

Fire prevention personnel (all are non-sworn civilians) are currently represented by the “Vancouver Fire Department Guild.”

== Fire Stations and Apparatus (listed by radio designator) ==
Fire Station Number	Fire Station Address	Engine Companies	Truck Companies	Battalion Chiefs	Water Tenders	Type 6 Wildland Engines (Brush and Squad)	Heavy Rescue	Hazardous Materials	Firefighter Rehab	Emergency Air (SCBA)	Fireboat	Reserve apparatus
1	2607 Main St.	Engine 1	Truck 1			Squad 1						
2	2106 Norris Rd	Engine 2		Battalion 1	Tender 2							
3	1110 N Devine Rd	Engine 3									Fireboat 1	
4	6701 NE 147th Ave	Engine 4		Battalion 2	Tender 4							Engine 14
5 (HQ)	7110 NE 63rd St	Engine 5	Truck 5			Squad 5	Heavy Rescue 5					Engine 15
6	3216 NE 112th Ave	Engine 6				Squad 6						
7	12603 NE 72nd Ave	Engine 7			Tender 7							
8	213 NE 120th Ave	Engine 8				Brush 8				Air 8		
9	17408 SE 15th St	Engine 9										
10	1501 NE 164th Ave	Engine 10	Truck 10					HazMat 10 & Foam 10 (F10 is a modular Ro/Ro Industrial Pump plus a Foam Tender)				
11	9606 NE 130th Ave	Engine 11				Brush 11			Rehab 11			Truck 17

== Museum ==
The Vancouver Fire Department Museum lost its facility in the late 1990s. Most of the museum's historic artifacts, including apparatus, are in storage. However, the public may view a 1925 Seagrave engine and some equipment in a view-from-outside museum display at Fire Station 10. No entry to the display area interior is allowed- please do not disturb the on-duty crew. The VFD has two other fully restored apparatus; a 1934 Seagrave engine, and the VFD's original Hunneman hand pumper. None of Vancouver's steam fire engines remain in the department's possession.

== Pipe Band ==
The "Vancouver Firefighters Pipes and Drums" band was formed in 2009. It was sponsored by IAFF Local 452, but raised operational funding through donations. The band received no fire department funding or support. The band's core purpose was to honor fallen firefighters and other public servants at memorials and other events. The band was regional in nature, with members from Vancouver FD, Clark Co. Fire District 6, Chehalis FD and Olympia FD. Membership was open to active duty and retired members of the region's fire and law enforcement agencies. Winter 2026 NOTE: Status of the band is inactive/defunct.
