= Exploration (video game) =

1994 video game

- Developer: Software 2000
- Publisher: Software 2000
- Platforms: Amiga, MS-DOS
- Release: 1994
- Genre: Strategy
- Modes: Single-player, multiplayer

Exploration (also known as Voyages of Discovery and Christoph Kolumbus in Germany) is a simulation strategy game designed by Software 2000 in 1994.

== Reception ==
Reception

Review scores
| Publication | Score |
|---|---|
| PC Gamer (US) | 76% |
| Computer Game Review | 73/70/73 |

Computer Game Review was unimpressed with the game, writing, "For a game called Exploration, there's really not a whole lot to explore." William R. Trotter of PC Gamer US was more positive: there is "nothing new here, but if you haven't burned out on colonization games, it's a good time", he wrote.
