= Discovery Academy (Richmond Hill, Ontario) =

Coordinates: 43.87221°N 79.43826°W

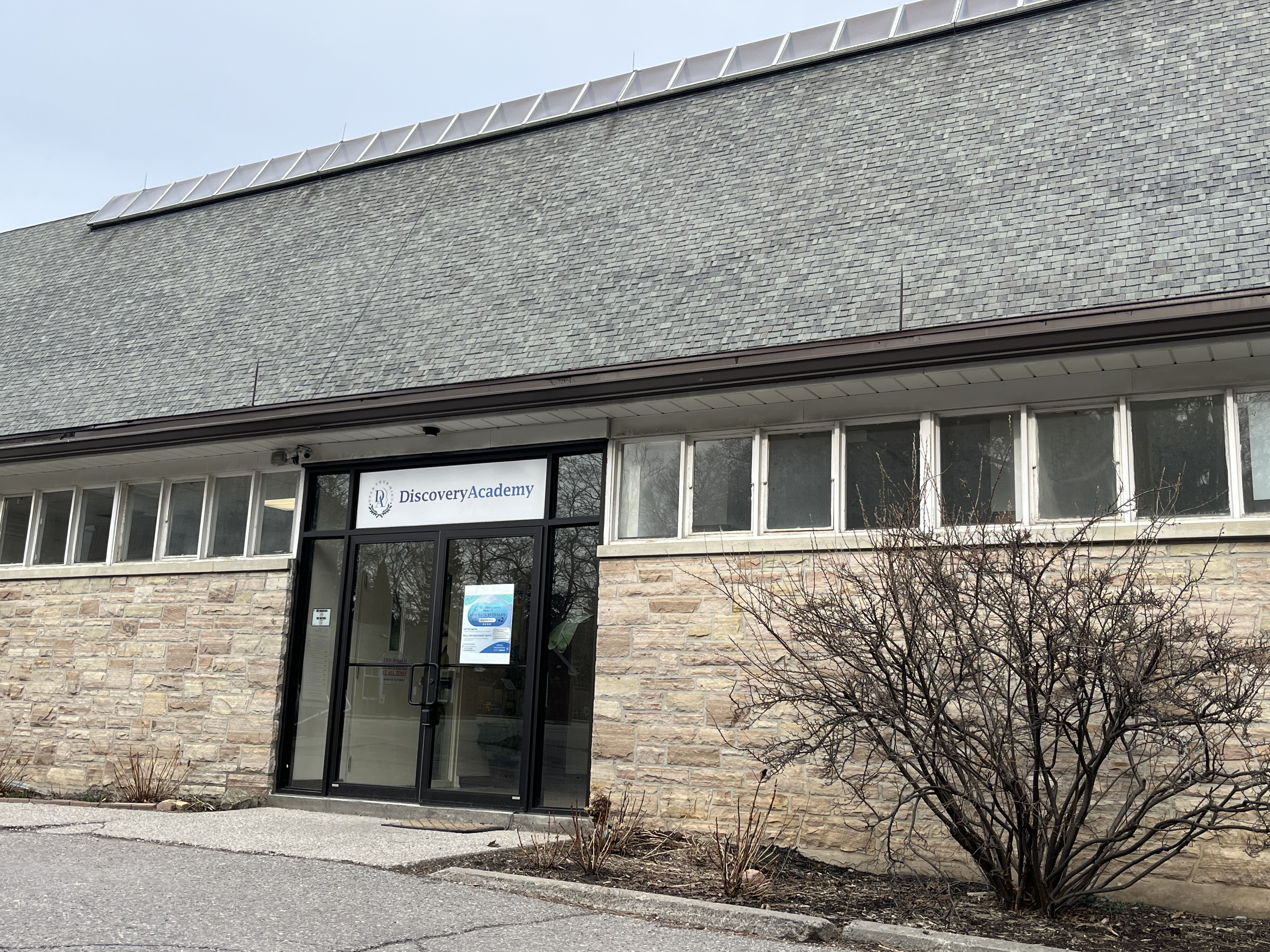
Discovery Academy

Discovery Academy is a co-educational private school located in Richmond Hill, Ontario with secondary and elementary divisions along with an international division. Discovery Academy offers Ontario Ministry of Education courses and others including TOEFL, IELTS, and programming. The school offers day and evening programs for students starting from Preschool through 12.

Discovery Academy was founded in 2006 by Marina Blumin, a researcher in nanotechnology at the University of Toronto. The school has an academic/gifted focus. Education is in English, with partial French immersion. There are no uniforms, and the elementary school uses in-house textbooks. The school's primary location is in Richmond Hill, Ontario, with an international school at the former Central School in Port Hope, which the school bought in 2011.

== Programs ==
Discovery Academy is certified by the Ontario Ministry of Education. Full day programs for students from Preschool through 12 as well as evening and weekend credit courses are available. Courses include all sciences, mathematics, history, English, business, and general studies. The international school also offers TOEFL and IELTS programs.

The average class size is 5–15.

The school offers online access to class materials and daily student progress reports.

== Extracurricular programs ==
Extracurricular programs and activities include Student Council, Yearbook Committee, Debate and Model United Nations Team, Music, Visual Arts and Photography, Chess and Gaming Club, Math League, Computer Programming as well as community events like field trips, bake sales, and donation drives.
