= Exploration Peak Park =

Regional park in Enterprise, Nevada, United States

- Interactive map of Exploration Peak Park
- Type: Regional park
- Location: 9700 South Buffalo Drive, Las Vegas, Nevada, United States 89178
- Coordinates: 36°00′54″N 115°16′05″W
- Area: 80 acres (32 ha)
- Etymology: Exploration Peak
- Operator: Clark County
- Website: Exploration Peak Park

Exploration Peak Park is an 80-acre regional park in the unincorporated town of Enterprise, Nevada, United States at Exploration Peak. It is among the top rated parks in the Las Vegas Valley.

== Amenities and activities ==
Exploration Peak Park features an Old West-themed playground which represents the Old Spanish Trail trade route that passed through nearby, picnic areas, horseshoe pits, and volleyball courts.

== Exploration Peak ==
Exploration Peak is the focal point and namesake of the park. There are multiple trails ascending and surrounding the peak, as well as an overlook at the top.
