= Pizza Principle =

Comparison between the cost of a slice of pizza and a subway ride in New York City

The Pizza Principle, or the Pizza-Subway Connection, in New York City, is a humorous but generally historically accurate "economic law" proposed by native New Yorker Eric M. Bram. He noted, as reported by The New York Times in 1980, that from the early 1960s "the price of a slice of pizza has matched, with uncanny precision, the cost of a New York subway ride."

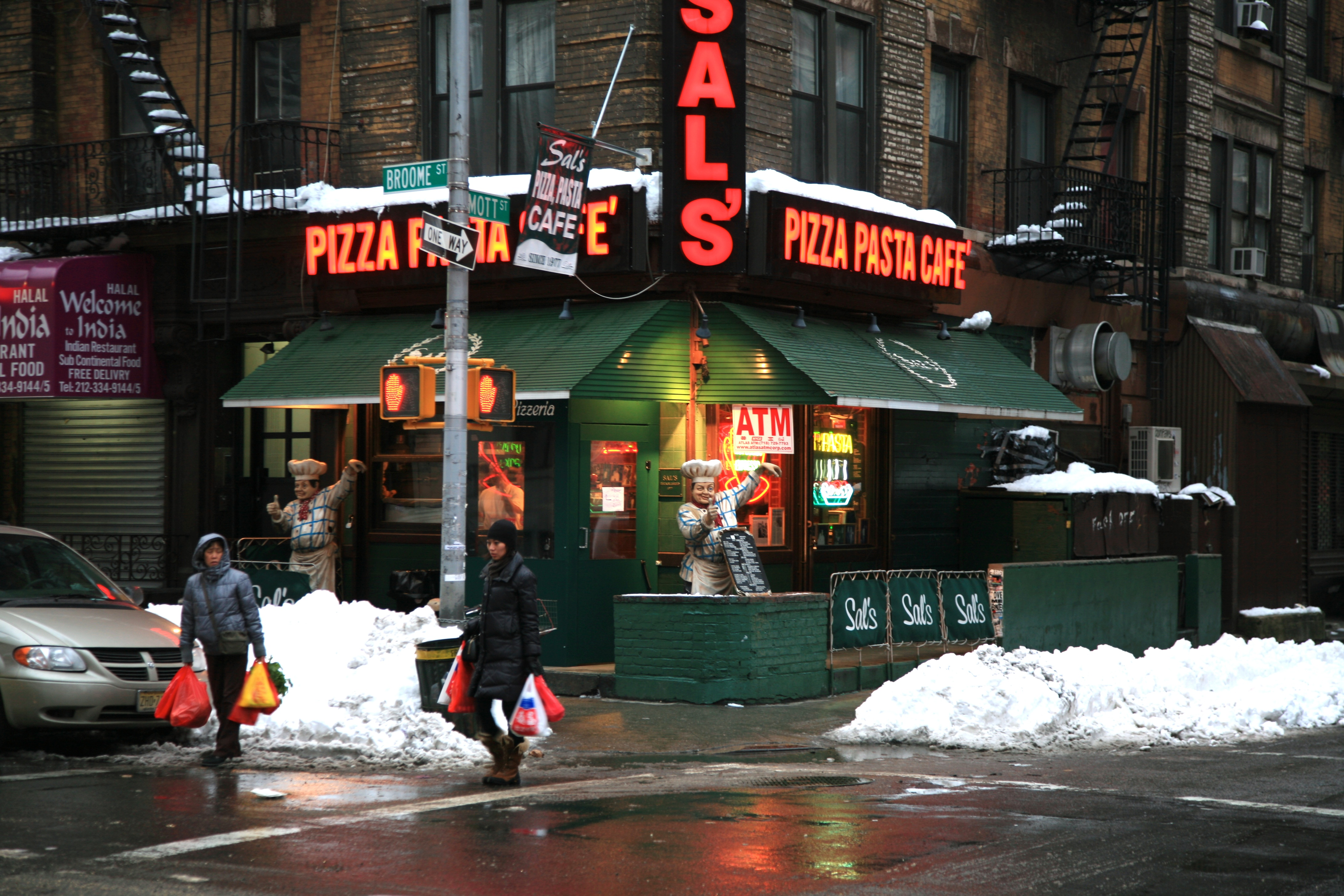
A pizzeria in New York City

In 1985, the late writer, historian, and film critic George Fasel learned of the correlation and wrote about it in an op-ed for The New York Times. The term "Pizza Connection" referring to this phenomenon was coined in 2002 by New York Times columnist Clyde Haberman, who commented on the two earlier publications of the theory in the Times, and predicted a rise in subway fare.

In May 2003, The New Yorker magazine proclaimed the validity of the Pizza Connection (now called the pizza principle) in accurately predicting the rise of the subway (and bus) fare to $2.00 the week before. They also quoted Mr. Bram (by then a patent attorney) as warning that since the New York City Transit Authority had announced the discontinuation of the subway token itself in favor of the variable-fare cost MetroCard (also used on the buses at that point), the direct correlation between the cost of an off-the-street slice of cheese pizza and the cost of a subway token might not continue to hold.

In 2005, and again in 2007, Haberman noted the price of a slice was again rising, and, citing the Pizza Connection, worried that the subway/bus fare might soon rise again. The fare did indeed rise to $2.25 in June 2009, and again in 2013 to $2.50. In 2014, Jared Lander, a professional statistician and adjunct professor at Columbia University, conducted a study of pizza slice prices within New York City and concluded that the Pizza Principle still held true. Other New York City news organizations occasionally confirm the ability of the Pizza Principle to predict increases in the cost of a single-ride subway/bus fare in the city.

In 2019, The Wall Street Journal noted that, due to a combination of a decrease in the fare bonus for a subway ride rather than an increase in the overall fare ($2.75 at the time) and the increased variability of the cost of pizza in New York City, the Pizza Principle may no longer be accurate. Inflation after the COVID-19 pandemic, plus a decision by the MTA to freeze fares, led to some evidence of a divergence in 2022. The subway fare was raised to $2.90 in 2025 and $3.00 in 2026; the average price of a pizza slice had continued to rise during that time, reaching nearly $4. Because of the continuing divergence, Gothamist wrote in late 2025 that the Pizza Principle was no longer accurate.

== See also ==
- Big Mac Index – Economic index published by The Economist
- KFC Index – Informal economic index
- New York City transit fares
- New York-style pizza – Large hand-tossed thin crust pizza
