= Discovery School, Tegucigalpa =

Discovery School

Location
- Tegucigalpa; Honduras
- Coordinates: 14.10859°N 87.16233°W

Information
- Type: Private
- Motto: “To prepare our students for the challenges of life”
- Established: 1993; 33 years ago
- Director: Kenneth Davis
- Enrollment: 209
- Language: English and Spanish
- Mascot: Wolves
- Website: discoveryschool.edu.hn

The Discovery School is a bilingual (English/Spanish) school located in Tegucigalpa, the capital city of Honduras.

== History ==
The school was founded in 1993 and is managed via an elected Board of Directors.

Discovery School is accredited by the Honduran Ministry of Education, U.S. Department of State Office of Overseas Schools and AdvancEd (SACS-CASI).

Students represent more than 18 nationalities and about 56% of students are from Honduras, 44% from the United States and other countries. There are 36 full time teachers and two full-time teaching assistants.

In 2006, the school relocated to its new campus outside of Tegucigalpa.

== Academics ==
Discovery School uses a U.S.-style curriculum and adopted Common Core in math and language arts. Currently, the school offers eight Advanced Placement (AP) courses and is also accredited by the College Board.
