= HMS Discovery =

Eleven ships of the Royal Navy and a reserve shore establishment of the Royal Canadian Navy have borne the name HMS/HMCS Discovery, while ships of other branches have also used the name:

- HMS Discovery (1600) was a discovery vessel in service between 1600 and 1620.
- HMS Discovery (1651) was a 20-gun ship purchased in 1651 and burnt in 1655.
- HMS Discovery (1692) was a 6-gun ketch launched in 1692 and broken up in 1705.
- HMS Discovery (1719) was a discovery sloop lost in the Arctic in 1719.
- HMS Discovery (1741) was a 6-gun storeship purchased in 1741 and sold in 1750.
- HMS Discovery (1774) was an 8-gun discovery vessel launched in 1774 as the civilian collier Diligence. She was acquired in 1775, and accompanied HMS Resolution on Captain James Cook's third voyage of exploration from 1776 to 1780. She became a dockyard transport in 1781 and was broken up in 1797.
- HMS Discovery (1789) was a 10-gun sloop launched and purchased in 1789. She was commanded by Captain George Vancouver on his voyage of exploration from 1791 to 1795. She was converted to a bomb vessel in 1799, a convict ship in 1818 and was broken up in 1834.
- HMS Discovery (1800) was a survey vessel in service in 1800 and sold in 1828.
- HMS Discovery was to have been a wood screw gunvessel. She was ordered in 1861 but was cancelled in 1863.
- HMS Discovery (1874) was a wood screw storeship, formerly the civilian Bloodhound, purchased in 1874. She was commanded by Captain George Nares during the British Arctic Expedition between 1875 and 1876. She was sold in 1902.
- HMS Discovery was a purpose-built survey ship launched in 1901. She was commanded by Captain Robert Falcon Scott during the Discovery Expedition to the Antarctic in 1901, and was sold in 1905. She was re-designated RRS (Royal Research Ship) Discovery in 1923, repurchased in 1929 as a training ship, and was handed over for preserving as a museum ship in 1979.
- HMCS Discovery, the Vancouver stone frigate of the Canadian Forces Naval Reserve, established as a volunteer half-company of the Royal Canadian Naval Volunteer Reserve in 1924 and commissioned as Discovery in 1941.

== Battle honours ==
- Portland 1653
- Copenhagen 1801

== See also ==
- HMS Discovery II, a World War II armed boarding vessel
- Space Shuttle Discovery, primarily named after Capt. Cook's ship of exploration.
