= South Kitsap School District =

School district in Washington, United States

Address
- 2689 Hoover Ave Southeast Port Orchard, Washington, 98366; United States

District information
- Type: Public
- Grades: PreK–12
- NCES District ID: 5308160

Students and staff
- Students: 9,343
- Teachers: 663 (FTE)
- Staff: 564.12 (FTE)
- Student–teacher ratio: 27.7

Other information
- Website: www.skschools.org

South Kitsap School District No. 402 is the second largest public school district in Kitsap County, Washington, United States. It serves the city of Port Orchard, a portion of the city of Bremerton and the southern area of the county (360 square miles). The district is the largest employer in Port Orchard.

== Enrollment ==
In May 2011, the district had an enrollment of approximately 9,830 students.

=== School years ===
- 2023-24 - 9,343
- 2022-23 - 9,188
- 2021-22 - 9,802
- 2020-21 - 10,169
- 2019-20 - 9,988
- 2018-19 - 9,851
- 2017-18 - 9,949
- 2016-17 - 9,910
- 2015-16 - 9,725

== Schools ==
=== High schools ===
- South Kitsap High School
- Discovery Alternative High School

=== Middle schools ===
- Cedar Heights
- John Sedgwick
- Marcus Whitman

=== Elementary schools ===
- Burley-Glenwood
- East Port Orchard
- Hidden Creek
- Manchester
- Mullenix Ridge
- Orchard Heights
- Sidney Glen
- South Colby
- Sunnyslope
- Olalla Elementary

=== Alternative programs ===
- Discovery Alternative High School
- Explorer Academy
