= Video games in Germany =

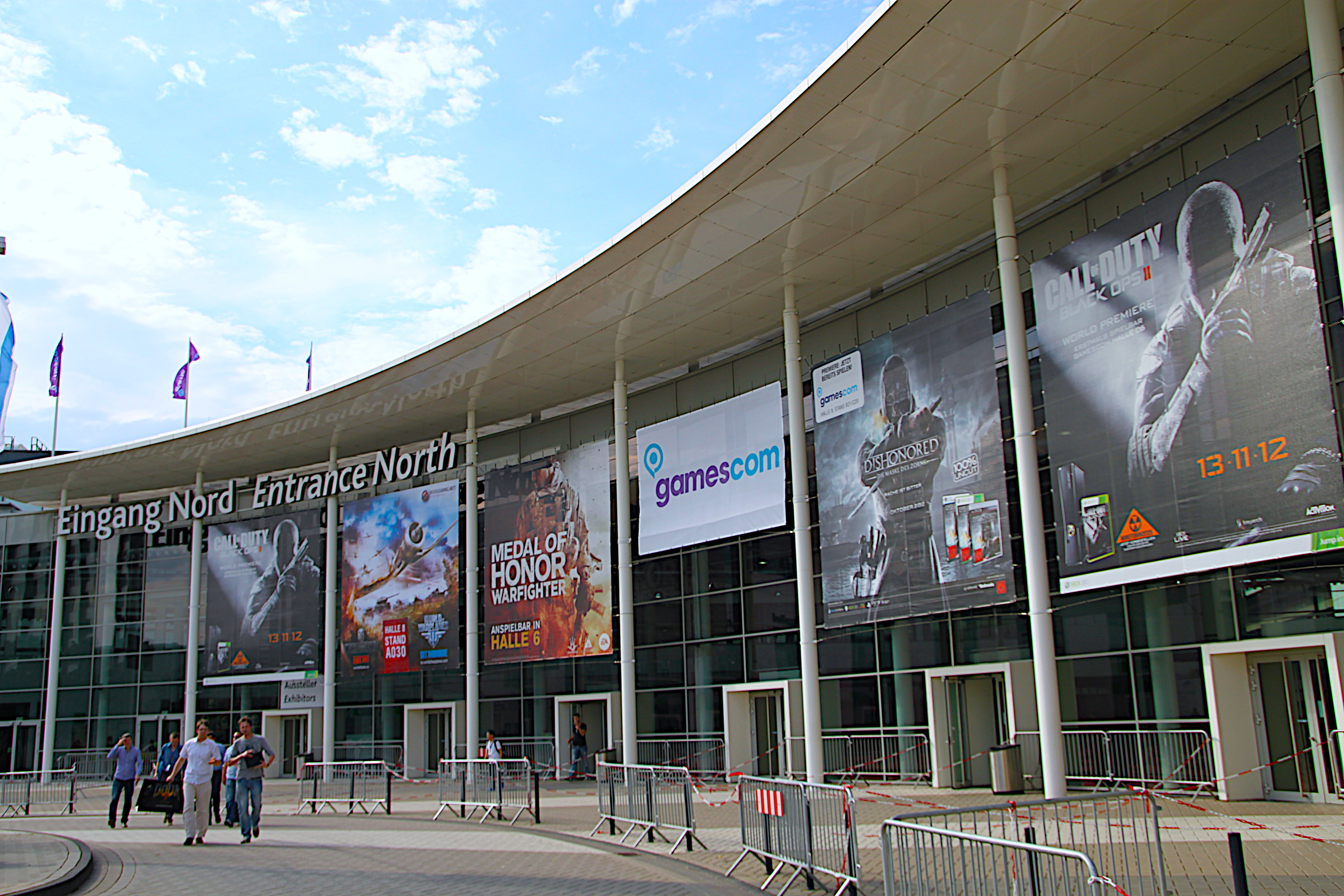
The Gamescom in Cologne is the world's largest gaming event, with 370,000 visitors and 1,037 exhibitors from 56 countries attending the event in 2018.

Germany has the second-largest video games player base in Europe, with 44.3 million gamers in 2018, after Russia. Consumers in Germany spent €5.87 billion on video games over the course of 2021, a 3 percent year-on-year increase from 2020. The video game market in Germany grew by 6 percent to €6.2 billion in 2019.

The annual Gamescom in Cologne is the world's largest video game expo by number of attendees.

== Home production ==
=== Origins ===
German production of popular video-games began principally on the 16-bit systems such as the Commodore Amiga and Atari ST in the 1980s, although a number of successful titles were also released on the Commodore 64 which dominated the 8-bit computer market in the country at the time. Popular developers of the 16-bit era included Thalion, Factor 5 (who were responsible for developing the entire Turrican series) and Blue Byte. Blue Byte and Factor 5 remain in existence in 2006 and produce titles for Windows PCs.

=== Early 2000s ===
By 2002, German games were heavily tilted toward construction and management simulations, according Der Spiegel's Frank Patalong. He noted that "nowhere else in the world are simulations as successful as here at home. Titles such as The Settlers, Die Völker [and] Anno 1602 have dominated the German sales charts for years". Released in 1998, Anno 1602 by Sunflowers Interactive was Germany's best-selling computer game of all time as of December 2002, with sales of 2.5 million copies worldwide and 1.7 million in the German market. Its sequel, Anno 1503, broke its sales record to become Germany's fastest full-price computer game to reach 500,000 domestic sales. It ultimately sold over one million units in German-speaking countries, and, when combined with its predecessor, reached 4.5 million sales worldwide by October 2006. The titles began the Anno series.

One of the most famed titles to come out of Germany is Far Cry by Frankfurt-based Crytek, who also produced Crysis. Factor 5 had been concentrating on the Star Wars: Rogue Squadron series of video games from 1999 until 2003, and released Lair, an action game for the PlayStation 3, in 2007.

Ascaron produced the Elite homage Darkstar One, and continued to produce the popular Anstoss (lit. 'Kickoff') series of football games, the first two installations of which were released under the title On the Ball in English-speaking countries.

The German Government, as a part of the Gamescom fair, has introduced an investment programme aimed towards the countrywide online games industry, with a purpose to offer assistance of as much as 50% of the cost of development.

== Companies ==
=== Game developers from Germany ===
Company	Location	Founded	Known for
314 Arts OHG	Coesfeld	2014	Vengeance, Projekt Z: Beyond Order
A Grumpy Fox	Frankfurt	2017	Lunistice
Aesir Interactive	Munich	2013 (Founded)	Police Simulator: Patrol Officers
Animation Arts Creative	Halle	2003	Secret Files series, Lost Horizon, Lost Horizon 2
Black Pants Studio	Berlin	2010	Tiny & Big in Grandpa's Leftovers, About Love, Hate and the other ones series, On Rusty Trails
bleakmill	Berlin, Glasgow	2017	Industria series
Bytro Labs GmbH	Hamburg	2009	Supremacy 1914, Call of War 1942, Conflict of Nations: WW3, Iron Order 1919.
Chimera Entertainment	Munich	2006	Angry Birds Epic, Angry Birds Evolution
Claymore Game Studios	Darmstadt	2020	Commandos: Origins
Clockwork Origins	Erlangen	2018	Elemental War series, Tri6: Infinite
Common Colors	Langen	2016	PRIM
Crytek	Frankfurt	1999	Crysis series, Far Cry, Warface, Hunt: Showdown
Daedalic Entertainment	Hamburg	2007	Deponia series, The Whispered World
Deck13	Frankfurt	2001	Ankh series, Jack Keane, Blood Knights, Lords of the Fallen, The Surge
Don VS Dodo GmbH	Munich	2020	Industry Giant 4.0
Egosoft	Würselen	1988	X series
Elaborate Games	Würzburg	2019	Elaborate Lands
Electrocosmos (Note: Electrocosmos also does co-dev & apps.)	Berlin	2012	Runic Rampage, The Plague Doctor of Wippra
Encrypt Games	Germany	2020	Lake Haven
Envision Entertainment (Note: Envision Entertainment got its staff from shuttered Phenomic Game Development (later: EA Phenomic).)	Ingelheim	2013	Path of War (2015, mobile), Pioneers of Pagonia
Fishlabs (Note: Fishlabs also does co-dev & porting. Previously publisher.)	Hamburg	2004	Galaxy On Fire series, Chorus, Goat Simulator: Remastered
Fluppisoft	Neubiberg	2015	Brick Rigs
Fourexo Entertainment	Dresden	2020	Highrise City
Gaming Minds Studios	Gütersloh	2009	DarkStar One, Patrician IV, Port Royale 3, The Dark Eye: Demonicon, Railway Empire
Gentlymad Studios UG (Note: Gentlymad Studios was acquired by publisher Assemble Entertainment in Oct 2017.)	Wiesbaden	2014	In Between (2015), Endzone: A World Apart
Grimlore Games	Maxvorstadt	2013	SpellForce 3: Soul Harvest, SpellForce 3: Fallen God, Titan Quest II
Hexagon Sphere Games UG	Hanover	2020	Sphere - Flying Cities
InnoGames	Hamburg	2007	Tribal Wars, Forge of Empires
Joymania Development GmbH (Note: Joymania Entertainment's founders previously worked at Blue Byte Software GmbH. Their new studio was initially named "Ohlmann Peter & Sprys Adam GbR" in 1997-1998. Ex-Joymania Entertainment in 1998-2002.)	Mülheim	1997 (Founded)	Knights and Merchants, Santa Claus in Trouble (series)
Keen Games (Note: Keen Games GmbH & Co. KG is the spiritual successor to Neon Studios with several of its co-founders.)	Frankfurt	2005	Secret Files: Tunguska, Anno: Create A New World, Sacred 3
King Art Games	Bremen	2000	The Book of Unwritten Tales, The Dwarves, Iron Harvest
Limbic Entertainment	Langen	2002	Might & Magic Heroes VI series (Co-dev.), Might & Magic X: Legacy, Might & Magic Heroes VII series, Tropico 6 series
Mad about Pandas UG (Ex-kunst-stoff GmbH till ~2016) (Note: Mad about Pandas UG's prior firm name 'kunst-stoff' also did co-dev, edutainment, gamification, AR/VR & interactive apps.)	Berlin	2005	Hitchhiker - A Mystery Game
Navel GbR	Ludwigsburg	2013	Mimics, Tilt Pack, Sling-A-Thing
Nine Worlds Studios	Munich	2021	Tropico 7
OMYOG Games	Cologne	2020	Project Ferocious
Proxy Studios	Erlangen	2009	Conquest: Divide and Conquer, Pandora: First Contact, WH40K: Gladius – Relics of War, ZEPHON
Radical Fish Games	Saarbrücken	2010	CrossCode
Randwerk Cooperative	Berlin	2020	ABRISS - build to destroy
Reakktor Studios (Note: Reakktor Studios is a new revival after Reakktor Media went down in 2012.)	Hanover	2014	Toxikk, G-Rebels
Realmforge Studios	Munich	2008	Ceville, M.U.D. TV, Dungeons, Dark, Spacebase Startopia
Related Designs (Blue Byte Mainz) (Note: Related Designs Software was renamed Ubisoft Mainz in 2019.)	Mainz	1995	Anno series, No Man's Land, Might and Magic: Heroes Online
Siactro (Note: Games by the sole developer of Siactro were published by Diplodocus Games.)	Cologne Bonn Region	2011	Super Kiwi 64
Stefan Kelnberger GmbH	Untergriesbach	2021	Railroads Online
SureAI	Tutzing	2003	Mad Restaurant People, Dreadful River. Mods for The Elder Scrolls & Fallout series.
Ubisoft Berlin	Berlin	2018	Far Cry series
Ubisoft Blue Byte	Düsseldorf	1988	The Settlers series, Assassin's Creed Identity
Yager Development	Berlin	1999	Dead Island 2, Spec Ops: The Line

==== Former studios ====
Company	Location	Founded	Known for
Ascaron	Gütersloh	1992 (Defunct 2009)	Sacred, DarkStar One
Attic Entertainment Software	Albstadt	1990 (Defunct 2001)	Realms of Arkania: Shadows over Riva
CAPS Softwaredesign ULM	Germany	1994~ (Defunct ~1996)	Arcy 2, Jack Flash, Bot Soccer
Coreplay (Note: Coreplay's co-founder Peter Ohlmann previously worked at Blue Byte Software GmbH and early version of Joymania Entertainment.)	Munich	2007 (Migrated to THQ Nordic as Grimlore Games in 2013)	Germany's Next Topmodel 2009, Ion Assault, Jagged Alliance: Back in Action
EA Phenomic	Ingelheim	1997 (Defunct 2013)	SpellForce: The Order of Dawn
eleven Software	Germany	1992~ (Defunct ~1994)	Dynatech, 2 adult games
Factor 5	Cologne	1987 (Defunct 2011)	Star Wars: Rogue Squadron (series), Turrican
Fusionsphere Systems	Aichach	2006 (Defunct 2017) (Merged into Animation Arts)	Secret Files series
House of Tales	Bremen	1998 (Defunct 2010)	The Mystery of the Druids, The Moment of Silence, Overclocked, 15 Days
Intergenies	Coesfeld	1999 (Inactive after 2017)	DoveZ - The Second Wave
Kritzelkratz 3000 GmbH	Würzburg	1996 (Inactive after 2016)	Go Kart Challenge (1999), Far West (2002. Co-dev.), Railroad Pioneer
LightBrain GmbH	Ellerau	2001 (Defunct 2009)	BomberFUN
Massive Development	Mannheim	1994 (Defunct 2005)	AquaNox
Master Creating GmbH	Hamburg	2001 (Defunct 2007)	Krakout Unlimited, Restricted Area, Legend: Hand of God
Mimimi Games	Munich	2011 (Defunct 2023)	Shadow Tactics, Desperados III, Shadow Gambit
NEON Software GmbH (Note: NEON Software GmbH (aka. Neon Studios) was bought by JoWood in 2000, but then closed down due to latter's financial difficulties. Different co-founders/shareholders later founded ZEAL GmbH, 49Games GmbH, & Keen Games. One co-founder previously founded Kaiko GmbH.)	Germany (Frankfurt?)	1993 (Defunct 2005)	Mr. Nutz: Hoppin' Mad, Tunnel B1, Armorines: Project S.W.A.R.M. (GBC), Dave Mirra Freestyle BMX (GBC), Legend of Kay
NumLock Software	Ludwigshafen	1994 (Defunct/inactive 2008)	Metalheart: Replicants Rampage, Campus: Student Life Simulation
Piranha Bytes	Essen	1997 (Closed 2024)	Gothic series, Risen series, ELEX series
Playcademy	Germany	2012 (Est.) (Defunct 2018)	Mobile/Hidden object games: eg. Farmington Tales, Tales of Lagoona
Radon Labs (Note: Radon Labs' name was founded in 2000 by the staff of TerraTools GmbH as its name closed down.)	Berlin	1995 (Defunct 2010)	Drakensang: The Dark Eye
Reakktor Media GmbH (Note: Reakktor Media was called Century Interactive in 1991-1997; reakktor.com in 1997-2001.)	Hanover	1991 (Defunct 2012)	Subtrade, Bermuda Syndrome, Neocron, Black Prophecy
Software 2000 (Ex-Cybernetic Corporation)	Eutin	1987 (Defunct 2002)	Pizza Tycoon, Exploration, Ocean Trader, Swing (1997), Fast Food Tycoon
Spellbound Entertainment	Offenburg	1994 (Defunct 2012)	Desperados: Wanted Dead or Alive, Robin Hood: The Legend of Sherwood
Spieleentwicklungskombinat GmbH (Note: Spieleentwicklungskombinat GmbH had an abbreviation as "SEK-Ost".)	Berlin	1998 (Defunct 2007)	Diggles: The Myth of Fenris, ParaWorld
Tantalus Software	Germany	1995~ (Defunct ~1995)	Abaron (1995)
Thalion Software	Gütersloh	1988 (Defunct 1994)	Amberstar, Ambermoon
Westka Interactive GmbH (Westka Kommunikation GmbH) (Note: Westka was the interactive entertainment arm of German media companies Brainpool TV and VIVA Media.)	Cologne	1993 (Defunct 2002)	The Famous Five: Kidnapped!, Arcatera: The Dark Brotherhood
Wings Simulations GmbH	Hattingen	1996 (Closed by JoWood in 2005)	Panzer Elite, Söldner: Secret Wars

=== Co-development ===
Company	Location	Founded	Known for	Notes
Conitec Datensysteme GmbH (Also 'Conitec Datasystems, Inc.')	Dieburg	1985	Middleware engine; former publisher. Also hardware & software.	
Deep Sky eG	Berlin	2023	Co-dev: games, VR/XR.	Ref.
Independent Arts Software GmbH	Hamm	1990	Dev, co-dev, porting.	
LAB132	Ostfildern	2017	Dev, co-dev, porting, VR.	
MAWI United GmbH	Wuppertal	2009	Sells AAA environment asset packs; makes high end animations, VFX, cinematics, pipeline development & real-time 3D renders (including tech demos).	
NeoBird GmbH & Co. KG	Nuremberg	2012	Dev, co-dev, AR/VR, gamification, serious games, mobile & web apps, 3D Viz, real-time 3D.	
NUKKLEAR GmbH	Hanover	2011	Dev, co-dev, porting.	Bought by Jumpgate AB in 2023.
The Light Works - Digital Imagery	Cologne	1996	2D/3D digital graphics, illustrations, cutscenes	Ref.

=== Game publishers from Germany ===
Company	Location	Founded	Type
Activision Blizzard Deutschland GmbH (Note: Activision Blizzard Deutschland's had many other former names in 1993 to 2008 - brief examples: Sierra Coktel, CUC Software, Cendant Software, HAVAS Interactive, Vivendi Universal. Ceased publishing in 2010.)	Ismaning branch	1993	distributor and former publisher
Aeria Games (Note: Aeria Games merged with gamigo in mid-2016.)	Berlin HQ	2006 (Founded in San Francisco)	publisher (online games)
Aerosoft GmbH	Büren HQ	1991	publisher, distributor & dev (sims)
Application Systems Heidelberg	Heidelberg	1985	publisher, distributor and dev
Assemble Entertainment	Wiesbaden HQ	2016	publisher and dev
Astragon	Düsseldorf	2000	publisher
Bigpoint Games	Hamburg HQ	2002	publisher and developer
bitComposer Interactive	Eschborn HQ	2009	publisher and former dev
Buchwald Interactive	Karlsruhe	2020	publisher and developer
ByteRockers' Games	Berlin HQ	2008	publisher and dev (casual)
CipSoft	Regensburg	2001	publisher & dev (online games)
Competition Company GmbH	Munich HQ	2020	publisher, marketing and dev (sims)
deCode GmbH	Oberhausen HQ	2012 (Ex-Niklas UG till 2015)	publisher and dev (websites, also games)
Diplodocus Games	Hagen	2015	publisher and dev
FDG Entertainment	Munich HQ	2001	core publisher, mobile dev
GameDuell	Berlin HQ	2003	distributor and developer
Gameforge	Karlsruhe HQ	2003	publisher
Gamigo	Hamburg HQ	2000	publisher
Goodgame Studios	Hamburg HQ	2009	publisher and developer
Gunzilla Games	Frankfurt HQ	2020	publisher and dev
HandyGames	Giebelstadt	2000	publisher & dev
Headup Games	Düren	2009	publisher and developer
HH-Games	Frankfurt	2018	publisher and former dev (casual)
Kalypso Media	Worms HQ	2006	publisher and developer
Magic Bytes (Note: Magic Bytes was a 1987 label of former German publisher, micro-partner Software GmbH, based in Gütersloh, Germany, which existed in 1986-1991. Their last published game was in 2000. The firm was revived in 2017 in Orlando, Florida with another office in Bielefeld, Germany.)	Bielefeld office	1987	publisher and former dev
MegaZebra	Munich HQ	2008	publisher and developer
Mooneye Studios	Hamburg	2014	publisher and dev (games)
NBG EDV Handels- und Verlags GmbH (Note: NBG EDV was bought by Activision in 1997. Does distribution only since 2011.)	Burglengenfeld	1988	distributor and former publisher
Nintendo of Europe GmbH	Frankfurt HQ	1990	publisher and main HQ for Nintendo's European division
Overhype Studios	Hamburg HQ	2014	publisher and dev
Pixelsplit Simulations	Frankfurt	2017	publisher and dev
Purple Sloth Studio eG c/o	Berlin	2018	publisher and dev
Rohn Media GmbH	Leipzig HQ	2014	publisher & dev (mobile/web)
Schwiezer System GmbH (Note: Schwiezer System is parent of Century/Reakktor, Nord XR.)	Hanover	1991	publisher, producer: core games; VR apps, media. Marketing.
Screen Juice Interactive	Cologne	2022	publisher and dev
SlinDev GmbH	Hamburg	2011	publisher and dev (indie games, VR)
TopWare Interactive	Karlsruhe	1996	publisher and former developer
Travian Games	Munich HQ	2005	publisher and developer
Ulisses Spiele	Waldems HQ	1991	publisher, dev
United Soft Media	Munich HQ	1994	publisher. (DE wiki)
Wooga	Berlin HQ	2009	publisher and developer

==== Former publishers ====
Company	Location	Founded	Type
Activision Deutschland GmbH (Note: Activision Deutschland's former name was "Take Us! Marketing & Consulting GmbH" in 1995 to 1997-06. "Take Us!" Was bought by Activision in 1997. Publishing taken over by "Activision Blizzard Deutschland GmbH" in 2008.)	Burglengenfeld branch	1995 (Defunct 2009)	publisher and former distributor
Blankhans GmbH	Munich HQ	2021 (Closed 2024)	publisher and dev (online games)
dtp entertainment	Hamburg HQ	1995 (Defunct 2012)	publisher and developer
Innonics GmbH	Hanover	1998 (Defunct 2002)	publisher, distributor and developer
Lifetimes	Germany	1988~ (Defunct ~1995)	publisher
phenomedia publishing gmbh (Note: The former names of "phenomedia" were "Art Department Werbeagentur GmbH" in 1993-1999 and "Phenomedia AG" in 1999-2004.)	Bochum	1993 (Defunct ~2022)	publisher, developer and former licensing (casual games)
Procom Datentechnik GmbH	Germany	1995~ (Defunct ~1995)	publisher
Rainbow Arts (Note: Most of Rainbow Arts people moved to or formed new companies in the late 1980s/early 1990s (e.g. Blue Byte, Factor 5, Spellbound Entertainment). Rainbow Arts became part of Softgold/Funsoft, then bought out by THQ in 1999.)	Gütersloh HQ	1984 (Defunct 1999)	publisher, developer, producer and porting
TLC Tewi Verlag GmbH	Munich	1977~ (Defunct ~1999)	publisher and distributor (books, software); game business in 1995-1999

== Games ==
=== Popular titles from Germany ===
- Ambermoon
- Ankh
- Anstoss
- Anno series
- AquaNox series
- BeamNG
- Brick Rigs
- Crazy Chicken series
- CrossCode
- Crysis series
- Deponia series
- Desperados series
- Elex series
- Enshrouded
- Everspace series
- Far Cry series
- FIFA Manager series
- Gothic series
- Katakis
- Knights and Merchants: The Shattered Kingdom
- Lunistice (video game)
- Might and Magic series (eg. X)
  - Heroes of Might and Magic series (eg. VI & VII series)
- Risen series
- Sacred (video game)
- Signalis
- Spec Ops: The Line
- SpellForce series
- Star Wars: Rogue Squadron series
- The Dark Eye franchise
  - Original Realms of Arkania trilogy
  - Drakensang duology
- The Great Giana Sisters
- The Settlers series
- Tropico series (eg. #6 series)
- Turrican
- X series

=== Consumption ===
Within Germany there is a popular taste for historical trade and warfare simulations, notably exceeding that of many other countries. Some German-developed titles in this genre, such as 1602 A.D. and its sequels, and The Patrician, have also been successful abroad.

Vehicle simulator games are also very popular in Germany. Many add-on developers for established simulator franchises, including Train Simulator and Microsoft Flight Simulator, are based in Germany, with one of the most popular, Aerosoft, being based in North Rhine-Westphalia.

First-person shooters have also been traditionally quite popular in recent years, and there has been considerable debate about and censorship of the violent content of many such games. Consequently these games, especially uncut versions, became highly coveted in gaming circles for many years (though the modern Internet and VPNs allow players virtually anywhere to obtain a game from, or play on a server hosted in, virtually any other jurisdiction today).

== Trade fairs ==
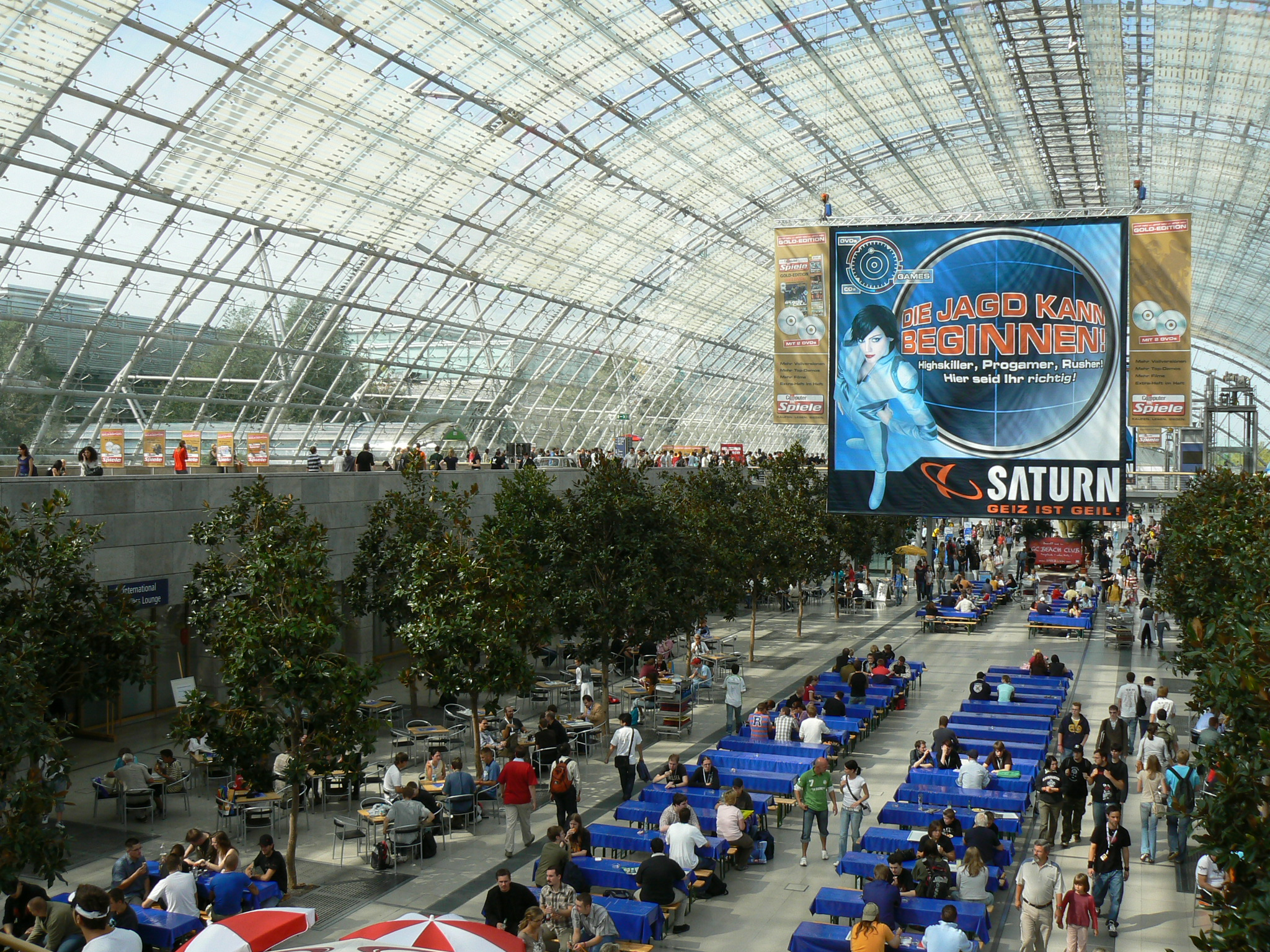
Games Convention 2006 in Leipzig, Germany

From 2002 to 2008 the main video game trade fair in Germany was the Games Convention which was held annually in Leipzig, and was highly recognized by the press. Since 2009 it was discontinued, as the Gamescom in Cologne took the place of the major video game trade fair in the world.

== The USK, BPjM and censorship ==
Violence in video games is a controversial subject in Germany, and German localisations of violent games are often heavily cut by the publishers to permit a public release. Usually this entails a simple removal or reduction of depictions of blood and gore, but often extends to cuts in the content or plot of the game, as was the case in Phantasmagoria, Phantasmagoria: A Puzzle of Flesh, Counter-Strike, Grand Theft Auto, Wolfenstein: The New Order, and South Park: The Stick of Truth.

All games that are released to the public are required to carry a certificate given by the USK (Unterhaltungssoftware Selbstkontrolle – Voluntary Monitoring Organisation of Entertainment Software). The compulsory nature of the USK label was a consequence of the 2003 modification of the Jugendschutzgesetz or youth protection law. If the USK has not issued a label, a game may be placed upon the "index" of media harmful to youth kept by the BPjM (Federal Department for Media Harmful to Young Persons). This results, at least, in a ban on promoting the game in any way and strict requirements for age checks. As prosecutors are inconsistent on whether reviews are a form of promotion this creates a chilling effect on games journalism for the affected titles. The strict requirements for age checks frequently lead to a game being taken off the market entirely, or only being made available in a cut version even for adults, due to economic considerations by developers/publishers. Independently, courts may also issue confiscation orders against games deemed to be especially egregious, resulting in an outright ban.

The 2003 changes to the Jugendschutzgesetz also announced an intent to extend the restrictions on the depiction of violence in video games, leaving open the possibility of banning any depiction of violence in video games, which was met by widespread outcry from the video game community in Germany. The then in power CDU/SPD coalition government announced an intention to enact this in 2005, but in November 2006 such restrictions were not enacted at that time.

== See also ==
- Killerspiel
