= Port Royal (disambiguation) =

Port Royal is a town in Jamaica, once the largest and most prosperous city in the Caribbean.

Port Royal or Port Royale may also refer to:

== Other places ==
=== Canada ===
- Port-Royal National Historic Site, Nova Scotia
  - Port-Royal (Acadia), Nova Scotia, a historic settlement
  - Annapolis Royal, Nova Scotia, known as Port Royal before 1710
  - Port Royal, Annapolis County, Nova Scotia
- Port Royal, Richmond County, Nova Scotia
- Port Royal, Newfoundland and Labrador
- Port Royal, Queensborough, New Westminster, British Columbia

=== France ===
- Port-Royal-des-Champs, or simply Port-Royal, an abbey in France, 1204–1709
- Port-Royal Abbey, Paris, or simply Port-Royal, daughter-house of Port-Royal-des-Champs, 1625–1792
- Port-Royal station, in Paris, named after Port-Royal Abbey

=== United States ===
- Port Royal, Kentucky
- Port Royal, Mississippi
- Port Royal, Pennsylvania
- Port Royal, South Carolina
  - Port Royal Sound
  - Port Royal Island, historically Port Royal
- Port Royal, Tennessee
  - Port Royal State Park
- Port Royal, Virginia
  - Port Royal Historic District
- Port Royal House, in Chatham, Massachusetts
- Port Royal, a neighborhood in Naples, Florida

=== Elsewhere ===
- Port Royal Bay, Bermuda
- Port Royal National Park, on the island of Roatán in Honduras

== Arts, entertainment and media ==
- Port Royale: Gold, Power and Pirates, a 2003 PC game
  - Port Royale 2
  - Port Royale 3: Pirates & Merchants
- Port-Royal, a 1837–1859 history of Port-Royal-des-Champs and Jansenism by Charles Augustin Sainte-Beuve
- Port-Royal, a 1954 play by Henry de Montherlant
- Port Royal (album), by Running Wild, 1988
- port-royal (band), an Italian electronica and post-rock band

== Other uses ==
- Order of Port Royal, modern Old Catholic order inspired by Port-Royal-des-Champs
- Port Royal, a brand of SABMiller beer
- Port Royal Golf Course, in Southampton, Bermuda
- Port Royal School, a historic building in South Carolina, U.S.
- HMS Port Royal, the name of several ships of the Royal Navy
- USS Port Royal, the name of several ships of the U.S. Navy

== See also ==
- Battle of Port Royal (disambiguation)
- Le Port-Royal Apartments, in Montreal, Canada
- Port-Royal Grammar, a 1660 grammar textbook
  - Port-Royal Logic, a 1662 logic textbook
