= Sacred 3 =

2014 video game

- Developer: Keen Games
- Publisher: Deep Silver
- Series: Sacred
- Platforms: Microsoft Windows, PlayStation 3, Xbox 360
- Release: EU: 1 August 2014; NA: 5 August 2014
- Genres: Hack and slash, brawler
- Modes: Single-player, multiplayer

Sacred 3 is a 2014 hack and slash brawler, part of the Sacred video game series. Deep Silver, which acquired the license to Sacred 3 from former development studio Ascaron Entertainment, announced at Gamescom that the earliest it could publish the game would be in early 2012. The game was released on 1 August 2014. It was met with mixed reception.

Another side-scrolling action brawler called Sacred Citadel, acting as a prequel to the Sacred 3 story, was released in 2013 to XBLA, PSN and Steam and developed by Southend Interactive.

== Gameplay ==
There are a variety of classes to choose from but those from Sacred 2: Fallen Angel have not returned. They were replaced by the Safiri Warrior and Ancarian Lancer. Some of the environments from the previous game made a return such as Castle Braverock.

Sacred 3 has four player co-op online and offline. Each ally has his or her own distinct set of active and passive skills. Everyone has a small number of abilities to equip at a time to keep the team from getting overpowered and may allow the combining of team powers to give the player additional ways to take down foes.

== Plot ==
Seraphim – guardians of the "Heart of Ancaria" – and their sacred bond between its people had kept the land at peace for centuries, but they've since been forgotten. Lord Zane – ruler of the Ashen Empire – allied himself with Demons, striving to open the gates to the underworld. Bound together by the chains of this evil empire, a resistance of Heroes was forged.

Players will need to defeat the oppressive ruler of Ashen Empire, Zane Ashen, and keep him from obtaining a powerful artifact known as the Heart of Ancaria.

== Development ==
Sacred 3 was developed by Keen Games, for the publisher Deep Silver. Shortly following the Gamescom announcement, Deep Silver called for fan feedback on desired features for Sacred 3 in its community forums.

In an interview, Martin Wein stated: "For the weakness of Sacred 2 I want to mention the Quality Assurance. As a target for Sacred 3 this will be a very important milestone to be taken care of. It's possible to deliver a bug free game." When asked about possible similarities or differences between the sequel and past installments, Wein stated: "We want to keep the charm of the series and you will stumble upon one or another popular character of the prequels."

== Reception ==
Reception

Aggregate scores
Aggregator	Score
GameRankings	(PS3) 55.11% (PC) 58.77% (X360) 51.00%
Metacritic	(PS3) 56/100 (PC) 57/100 (X360) 51/100

Review scores
Publication	Score
Destructoid	5/10
Eurogamer	5/10
GameSpot	4/10
GamesRadar+	2/5
GamesTM	6/10
GameTrailers	5/10
IGN	6.5/10
Official Xbox Magazine (US)	5/10
Hardcore Gamer	3/5
The Escapist	3/5

The game received "mixed" reviews, according to video game review aggregator Metacritic. The Escapist's James Stephanie Sterling wrote that fans of the series could be disappointed and fans of the hack and slash genre would prefer other titles.
