= Tribal war (disambiguation) =

Tribal war and similar phrases can mean:

- endemic warfare, the mode of warfare common in tribal societies
- TribalWars, an online browser game
- Heimosodat, wars around Finland in 1918-1920
