= Battle of Port Royal (disambiguation) =

The Battle of Port Royal occurred in South Carolina in 1861 during the American Civil War.

Battle of Port Royal or Siege of Port Royal may refer to:

- The Battle of Port Royal (1690), Acadia, in King William's War
- The Siege of Port Royal (1707), Acadia, in Queen Anne's War
- The Siege of Port Royal (1710), Acadia, in Queen Anne's War
- Any of several sieges of Annapolis Royal, Nova Scotia, known as Port Royal before 1710
- The 1779 Battle of Port Royal Island, South Carolina, in the American Revolutionary War

== See also ==
- Port Royal (disambiguation)
