= Patrician II: Quest for Power =

2000 video game

- German cover art
- Developer: Ascaron
- Publishers: EU: Infogrames; NA: Strategy First
- Director: Daniel Dumont
- Programmer: Bernd Ludewig
- Artist: Christoph Werner
- Composer: Yanco
- Platform: Windows
- Release: GER: 24 November 2000; WW: 2001
- Genre: Business simulation
- Modes: Single-player, multiplayer

Patrician II: Quest for Power, entitled Patrizier 2: Geld und Macht in Germany, is the second video game from developer Ascaron in their Patrician series. The sequel to The Patrician, it is a game simulating trading, piracy, politics, and economy. An expansion pack, Patrizier 2: Aufschwung der Hanse, was released in Germany in 2001. A compilation release containing the main game and the expansion was released as Patrizier 2: Gold Edition in Germany in 2002 and as Patrician III: Rise of the Hanse internationally in 2003. A sequel, Patrician IV, was released in 2010.

== Setting ==
Patrician II is set during the 1300s, and simulates the Hanseatic League's trade operations in Northern Europe.

== Reception ==
=== Sales ===
Patrician II was commercially successful. In the German market, it debuted at #2 on Media Control's computer game sales chart for December 2000. Holding the position in its second month, the game proceeded to place fifth and eighth in February and March 2001, respectively. At the end of February, the Verband der Unterhaltungssoftware Deutschland (VUD) presented Patrician II with a "Gold" award, indicating sales of at least 100,000 units across Germany, Austria and Switzerland. The committee noted that it was primed to "continue [the] success story" of its hit predecessor. By October, Patrician II had spent 11 consecutive months in Media Control's top 30; it placed 26th that month.

According to GameStar's Christian Schmidt, Patrician II's German-region success was coupled with popularity beyond its domestic markets, including lifetime sales of 60,000 units in Spain. In 2006, publisher FX Interactive reported that global sales of the overall Patrician franchise, including Patrician II, had surpassed 1 million units.

=== Critical reviews ===
Reception (Patrician II: Quest for Power)

Review scores
Publication	Score
Computer Gaming World	3.5/5
PC Zone	64/100
Computer Games Magazine	4/5
The Electric Playground	6/10

Patrician II received generally positive reviews.

== Patrician III: Rise of the Hanse ==
In German, Patrician II had an add-on release called Patrizier 2: Aufschwung der Hanse in 2001. It was released internationally as Patrician III: Rise of the Hanse, a standalone SKU that combines Patrician II and its expansion. The German version was released in 2002 and the English version on 24 October 2003. A sequel, Patrician IV, was released in 2010.

The game is a trading and economic simulation. Goods of varying types are produced in the towns, and may be sold in other towns on the game map which do not produce them. The players start as a fledgling trader with one or two ships of small size, a trade office in the town of player's choosing, and some money.

Gaining wealth and reputation, they are permitted to open additional trading offices, and can build larger and better armed ships. Industrial and agricultural businesses can be opened to supply raw materials such as grain, timber, pig iron, or wool and finished goods such as pottery, iron goods, cloth, or beer. There are a series of ranks which the players can attain through wealth and popularity. These ranks are placed in order of increasing power: Shopkeeper, Trader, Merchant, Travelling Merchant, Councillor, Patrician, Lord Mayor, and Alderman.

Competitors roam the seas, as do pirates. The method in which one must increase their rank is to increase their financial status and gain reputation. One can organize feasts, donate to the church, donate public buildings, and defend against attack. The players can also turn to the dark side, engage in piracy, smuggle goods, and even attack towns, among other things, for cash and goods.

If needed goods are not supplied to the cities, population and markets decline. With adequate goods, the league thrives. The system becomes increasingly difficult to manage as it grows. From a starting population of a few tens of thousands, growth to many hundreds of thousands is possible. New cities may be founded, and socially as they advance they may become lord mayor of player's town, in charge of its defense against pirates, marauders of the countryside, or the local Prince who may besiege and loot their city. The players undertake missions as mayor, and may ultimately become the Alderman, the leader of the Hanseatic League. Trade with the Mediterranean cities (which must be discovered) and also with American tribes is possible as well, for potentially great profits.

The game may be played either as solo player or in a multiplayer game modes with various difficulty settings; a map editor permits addition of different cities.

=== Reviews and sales ===
Reception (Patrician III: Rise of the Hanse)

Review scores
Publication	Score
Computer Gaming World	2.5/5
PC Gamer (US)	70%

The game received generally favorable reviews from critics. On the review aggregator GameRankings, the game had an average score of 72% based on 12 reviews. On Metacritic, the game had an average score of 75 out of 100, based on 8 reviews.

Patrician III received a "Gold" award from the Asociación Española de Distribuidores y Editores de Software de Entretenimiento (aDeSe), for more than 40,000 sales in Spain during its first 12 months.

== See also ==
- Video gaming in Germany
