= Sacred Citadel =

2013 video game

- Developer: Southend Interactive
- Publisher: Deep Silver
- Series: Sacred
- Platforms: PlayStation 3, Windows, Xbox 360
- Release: Windows; 16 April 2013; PlayStation 3: NA: 16 April 2013; PAL: 17 April 2013; Xbox 360; 17 April 2013
- Genres: Action, beat 'em up
- Modes: Single-player, multiplayer

Sacred Citadel is a side-scrolling action brawler video game in the Sacred series. It was released in April 2013, and takes place before the 2014 sequel Sacred 3. It was developed by Southend Interactive and published by Deep Silver for Xbox Live Arcade, PlayStation Network, and Microsoft Windows. A DLC called Sacred Citadel: Jungle Hunt was released on the same month.

== Reception ==
Reception

Aggregate score
Aggregator	Score		
Aggregator	PC	PS3	Xbox 360
Metacritic	61/100	62/100	63/100

Review scores
Publication	Score		
Publication	PC	PS3	Xbox 360
4Players	50%	50%	50%
Destructoid	6/10	N/A	N/A
Game Informer	7.25/10	N/A	N/A
GameRevolution	N/A	N/A	8/10
GameZone	7/10	N/A	N/A
IGN	5.9/10	N/A	5.9/10
PlayStation Official Magazine – Australia	N/A	50%	N/A
Official Xbox Magazine (US)	N/A	N/A	6.5/10
Push Square	N/A	7/10	N/A
RPGFan	65%	N/A	N/A
National Post	N/A	N/A	6.5/10

The game received "mixed" reviews on all platforms according to the review aggregation website Metacritic.
