= Ilomilo =

2010 video game

ilomilo
- Developers: Southend Interactive; Microsoft Game Studios
- Publisher: Microsoft Game Studios
- Composer: Daniel Olsén
- Platforms: Windows Phone 7, Xbox 360, Microsoft Windows
- Release: Windows Phone 7 November 8, 2010; Xbox Live Arcade; November 26, 2010^{(with redemption code)} January 5, 2011; March 9, 2011 (Autumn Tale); Windows 8 December 6, 2012
- Genre: Puzzle
- Modes: Single-player, multiplayer

ilomilo (/iːloʊˈmiːloʊ/) is a puzzle video game developed by Southend Interactive and Microsoft Game Studios. It was released on Windows Phone 7 on November 8, 2010, for AT&T customers. The game was also released for Xbox Live Arcade on January 5, 2011. A DLC, titled ilomilo: Autumn Tale, was released for Xbox 360 only in March 2011. The game became available on Xbox One through its backwards compatibility program in May 2017. There is also a port for Windows 8 that adds 2 new sets of puzzles, 6 new pieces of music, and new story snippets. These new sets of levels are called "berry story" and "playroom escapade", and never became available on the 360 version.

== Gameplay ==
The goal of each of the 49 levels is to unite Ilo and Milo, who are on separate sides of the level and must work together to meet. Players can change control between Ilo and Milo, or two players can control both Ilo and Milo. Because only one character can be "active" at any time, players in multiplayer alternate between controlling their given character and using a "pointer" to help guide the active player. "Eggs" are hidden on certain levels which are only accessible in multiplayer. Levels are made up of various cubes, some of which Ilo or Milo can pick up and carry in order to place elsewhere in the level, opening a path for the other to travel on. Different cubes have different effects, such as some which extend across gaps or some that allow Ilo or Milo to fall through and end up on the other side. There are also carpets which allow characters to walk on different sides of the cubes and switches which activate bridges. Hidden throughout the levels are various fragments, which when collected piece together postcard memories, explaining some of the game's backstory. There also tiny creatures called Safkas hidden in each level, which unlock bonuses when collected. The levels that these safkas open contain a part of Sebastian's "The Huntsman and the Fox", levels with appearances from other games, and levels with re-skins of Ilo and Milo themselves. The characters that can be seen in the purple safka's levels are The Goo Balls from World of Goo, Victor Neff from The Dream Machine (video game), Meat Boy from Super Meat Boy, and Josef from Machinarium. Additional content is also available if the player owns A World of Keflings or Raskulls.

== Plot ==
Ilo and Milo are two friends that meet daily for companionship inside a bizarre park in a strange world, populated by odd characters including other safkas, utilitarian lifeforms known as "cubes", and the haughty but helpful Sebastian, a small man wearing a bicorne and riding a flying beetle.

Each time Ilo and Milo leave for the night and return to each other in the day, the park becomes more and more complicated to navigate (in a reference to the game's levels and puzzle elements). After one meeting, Ilo and Milo become upset at the thought of leaving each other again, crying so heavily that the subsequent levels are played underwater. Later they each have an idea to draw maps for each other and hurl them about the park in hopes the other finds them, ironically making the park even more confusing to navigate. In the final chapter, Ilo and Milo resolve not to go home at nighttime, and instead search for the sun so that they may stay together. Becoming lost once again, they finally reunite at a vehicle that resembles a locomotive fused with a biplane, and depart from the park in it. Vowing never to separate again, they wander the world together.

The main story is allegorical for a brief subplot involving two human characters named "Ilona Zevon" and "Milton Foley"; the player receives snippets of the subplot (in the form of written letters) after collecting enough "Memory Fragments" found in the levels. In this subplot, Ilona and Milton write letters to each other frequently and desire to meet together at their favorite spots, including an unknown park and lake. Ilona eventually stops meeting with Milton and writing altogether; Milton persists in sending mail, only to have it returned from a "Dr. Jacob", who claims that Ilona no longer resides at the intended residence. Ilona is later revealed to have been barred from seeing Milton by "they". Milton reestablishes contact with Ilona and resumes their meetings, and Ilona acquires two tickets for an unknown night train, asking they "never turn back". The final snippet is a missing persons report for Ilona and Milton, dated November 29.

A second subplot, a fable called "The Huntsman and the Fox", is narrated to the player by Sebastian, if they encounter him in specific bonus levels. The fable involves a fox, a hunter, and his fiancé. The fiancé asks the huntsman to kill a fox and create from it a beautiful fur boa. The huntsman goes into the forest and encounters the fox, but the fox convinces the huntsman to spare it for the sake of its family. The fiancé is furious and threatens to leave the huntsman if he does not produce a boa, and the huntsman confronts the fox again. The fox strikes a deal with the huntsman, offering its tail in exchange for its life and the vow of the huntsman to never again harm a fox. The fiancé however rejects the tail alone as too inadequate to make a beautiful boa with, and the huntsman decides to break his deal with the fox. The fox warns the huntsman that if he is killed, the huntsman will never be able to leave the forest, as it is the only guide in or out; as the master of the forest, the huntsman is disbelieving and kills the fox. The fox however proves correct, and the huntsman soon becomes hopelessly lost. After much wandering, the huntsman encounters an abandoned house and enters it, only to be sealed inside by an unknown force forever. The fiancé is left pining for the huntsman, eventually forgetting about the boa but never of him. Sebastian later suggests that the huntsman eventually became the new forest guide.

== Reception ==
Reception

Aggregate score
Aggregator	Score
Metacritic	81/100

Review scores
Publication	Score
The A.V. Club	A−
Destructoid	8/10
Eurogamer	9/10
Game Informer	8.75/10
GamePro	4.5/5
GameRevolution	B+
GameSpot	7.5/10
GameZone	8.5/10
IGN	8/10
Joystiq	4/5
Official Xbox Magazine (US)	8/10
Pocket Gamer	(WP7) 4.5/5 (PC) 3.5/5
The Telegraph	8/10
The Guardian	4/5
411Mania	8.8/10
Metro	7/10

The Xbox 360 version received "favorable" reviews according to the review aggregation website Metacritic. MSPoweruser gave the Windows Phone 7 (WP7) version an overall score of 5/5. Edge gave the Xbox 360 version six out of ten, praising the intelligent puzzles, but criticized the game's artistic direction.

Since its release, the Xbox 360 version sold 16,152 units by January 2011. Sales of the game and Autumn Tale moved to a combination of 171,419 units by the end of 2011.

Billie Eilish, who is a long-time fan of the game, wrote "Ilomilo", a song named after and inspired by the game, for her debut album When We All Fall Asleep, Where Do We Go?
