= Pirate Hunter =

2003 action-adventure video game

Pirate Hunter: Seize & Destroy
- Developer: Ascaron Entertainment
- Publisher: Encore
- Platform: Windows
- Release: October 22, 2003
- Genres: Action-adventure, strategy
- Mode: Single-player

Pirate Hunter: Seize and Destroy (German: Piraten: Herrscher der Karibik) or Tortuga: Pirates of the New World is an action-adventure video game developed by Ascaron Entertainment UK Ltd and published by Encore, and released in 2003 for Microsoft Windows.

== Gameplay ==
The player plays a sailor in the Caribbean during the Age of Sail. The player can experience 16 different scenarios and 14 different ships, from a sloop to a ship-of-the-line, and many quests. The game features real-time sea battles and a top-down view that is similar to a real-time strategy game.

== Development ==
The game was originally set to be named Tortuga, but its name was changed during development to Piraten: Herrscher der Karibik .
Later the videogame was also released under title Tortuga: Pirates of the New World.

== Reception ==
Pirate Hunter holds an average of 70% on aggregate website GameRankings. The game received a score of 72% from PC Gamer US.
