= The Patrician (video game) =

Historical trading simulation computer game

- German cover art, featuring a cropped version of Portrait of Bernhart von Reesen by Albrecht Dürer
- Developer: Ascon
- Publisher: Triptychon Software
- Programmers: Bernd Ludewig; Thomas Schlötel
- Artist: Michael Grohe
- Composer: Jörg Doepper
- Platforms: Amiga, Atari ST, MS-DOS
- Release: June 1992 (Germany); 1993 (international)
- Genre: Business simulation
- Modes: Single-player, multiplayer

The Patrician (German: Der Patrizier) is a 1992 historical trading simulation video game for Amiga, Atari ST and MS-DOS developed by Ascaron Entertainment and published by Triptychon Software. In the game, the player assumes the role of a merchant in any of several cities of the Hanseatic League, accumulating money, capital and consumer goods, and real estate, expanding his company, and furthering his career at home and abroad.

== Gameplay ==
The main action of The Patrician typically consists of trading, using trading offices and ships. Supply and Demand play an important role in this game. Generally seen as one of the more complex business simulations, Patrician can overwhelm the player with too much information. Players can also build public works, private houses, and industries, pursue a career in politics, and interact with such characters as pirates and burglars.

The game features an advanced dynamic economy which can be influenced by the actions of both the human players and the A.I.-controlled players. This in turn affects the various towns (constantly buying high and selling low will cause a town to grow poorer, for instance).

By helping a town grow, the player will gain popularity there, which will help in the Hanseatic elections. The goal of the game is to be elected leader of the Hanseatic League, but the player can only take part in Hanseatic elections once he or she has been elected lord mayor of the home town.

Ascaron released two sequels to 1992's The Patrician; Patrician II: Quest for Power (2000) and Patrician III: Rise of the Hanse (2002). The Patrician series was continued in 2010 with The Patrician IV, after Kalypso Media bought the licenses from the insolvent Ascaron company.

== Reception ==
The Patrician was a commercial success. By 2000, its sales at full price had totaled roughly 250,000 units.

A Computer Gaming World reviewer in 1993 criticized the identical cities, "simplistic" combat, and "mundane" trading, stating that "the long term appeal of this game, except to bank managers and chartered accountants, is therefore questionable". He concluded that The Patrician was "too Germanic in appearance, perhaps needing a bit of British innovation, some French savoir faire, or maybe some Stateside polish". Another reviewer in 1994 liked the graphics and interface (especially as he criticized the manual's English translation and accuracy), but warned that "once the pricing system is understood, the trading elements of the game becomes somewhat repetitive". He recommended The Patrician to those looking for an unusual, non combat-oriented strategy game.

The One gave the Amiga version of The Patrician an overall score of 82%, comparing the gameplay to 1869, stating: "This is the game that 1869 should have been; it has more character, more depth and better presentation ... The historical background adds a tremendous amount of atmosphere". The One also praised the user-friendly UI and the need to progress both politically and financially, and expressing that expanding their fleet of ships "gives an excellent feeling of power".

ST Format's Rob Mead writes, "This is a perfect game for wannabe managers and, with up to three other human players all sitting round your ST at once, soon turns into a mental battle of wits against your pals as you all try to get one up on each other."

== See also ==
- Merchant Prince
- List of business simulation video games
