= Port Royale: Gold, Power and Pirates =

2002 video game

- Developer: Ascaron Entertainment
- Publishers: EU: Ascaron Entertainment; NA: Tri Synergy; JP: CAPCOM
- Platform: Windows
- Release: GER: June 5, 2002; NA: June 5, 2003
- Genre: Business simulation game
- Modes: Single-player, multiplayer

Port Royale: Gold, Power and Pirates (known in Germany as Port Royale: Gold, Macht und Kanonen) is a business simulation game set in the Caribbean and partly the Atlantic during the 16th and 17th centuries. It combines business–economic simulation with real-time battles and towns that can be visited for trade and other purposes. A sequel, Port Royale 2, was released in 2004. A third installment, Port Royale 3: Pirates & Merchants, was released in 2012, and a fourth installment, Port Royale 4, was released in 2020.

== Gameplay ==
It is an open-ended game and the players can choose any type of career that they wish, including trading and interactions with pirates (including privateering).

There are also many other activities in the game besides trading or hunting down pirates. Players can visit governors in towns and accept missions from them as long as their reputation with the country is good enough. Missions include armed transport and tracking down lost relatives that have been kidnapped by an NPC called Axesmith (whom the player can choose, eventually, to defeat outright in battle). Treasure maps, purchased in pieces from around the game board, can also lead to newfound wealth and even the creation of a private port.

An important part of the game are the colonial nations in the Caribbean (Spain, France, England and The Netherlands) and their relationships.

There are a total of 12 different ship types available to players, of increasing cost, efficacy in battle and room for cargo. They range from the small pinnace, to a large ship of the line.

== Development and release ==
The game was created by Ascaron Entertainment in 2002. The sequel Port Royale 2 was released over a year after in September 2004.

On August 2, 2011 the publisher Kalypso Media who purchased many of the licenses and assets from Ascaron Entertainment during its insolvency, announced that they had acquired the licences of the Port Royale installment. They announced also that they were already working on the third title, named "Port Royale 3". This released on May 4, 2012. A fourth title, Port Royale 4, was released in 2020.

== Reception ==
Reception

Aggregate score
Aggregator	Score
Metacritic	79/100

Review scores
Publication	Score
Computer Gaming World	3.5/5
GameSpot	8.5/10
GameSpy	3/5
GameZone	8.5/10
IGN	8.4/10
Jeuxvideo.com	12/20
PC Gamer (US)	71%
PC Zone	75%

The game received "generally favorable reviews" according to the review aggregation website Metacritic.

The editors of GameSpot named Port Royale the best computer game of June 2003, and later nominated the game for their 2003 "Best Game No One Played" award, which ultimately went to Amplitude.

== See also ==
- Video gaming in Germany
