= Patrician IV =

2010 video game

- Windows edition cover art
- Developers: Gaming Minds Studios; RuneSoft (Mac)
- Publisher: Kalypso Media
- Director: Daniel Dumont
- Programmer: Kay Struve
- Platforms: Windows, Mac OS X
- Release: September 2010 (Win); 9 April 2014 (OS X)
- Genre: Business simulation
- Modes: Single player, multiplayer

Patrician IV (Note: Also known as Patrician IV: Conquest by Trade) is a business simulation game developed by Gaming Minds Studios and part of the Patrician series. It is a game simulating trading, piracy, politics and economics. An expansion pack, Rise of a Dynasty, was released in April 2011.

The game received mixed reviews from critics, who noted the lack of a multiplayer component that had been present in Patrician III and its generally dry presentation.

== Gameplay ==
The player serves as a member of the Hanseatic League in a map centered on Northern Europe with the goal of trying to become a major power within it. To increase their wealth and power, the player engages in trade by hiring ships to sell goods across the map. As the player's wealth grows from trade, they are able to participate in mayoral politics in different cities to increase their direct power, build businesses in towns, and engage in combat.

The game contains a campaign mode which teaches the game mechanics to the player, and a free play mode, where the player is given a level of freedom to pursue their own priorities. The campaign mode functions as a tutorial for the player by giving them set tasks with video examples demonstrating how to complete different functions; the game's manual also contains information on key concepts.

== Development ==
After the release of Patrician 3, the staff at German video game developer Ascaron focused on their Port Royale series of games but after its lack of success in its German domestic market, decided to continue with developing the next game in the Patrician series. Ascaron, the original publisher of the Patrician series, filed for bankruptcy in June 2009 and Kalypso Media bought Patrician along with a number of other properties in a sale. Kalypso also formed Gaming Minds Studios with ex-Ascaron video game developers, including employees who had previously worked on the Patrician series. Kalypso announced that Patrician IV would be the first game released from the Ascaron property rights library they had purchased.

The developers decided to discontinue the use of the previous game's pixel graphics and created a new 3D engine for the game to try to attract players of other strategy simulation games, like the Anno video game series. The team decided to forgo a multiplayer mode for the release because of concerns that it would not scale well with other players.

The game was announced as one of the launch titles for the OnLive cloud service in 2011.

== Reception ==
The game received mixed reviews from critics, receiving a 66% from Metacritic. IGN's Jon Habib noted that the game was fun to play once, criticizing its lack of replayability and the removal of the multiplayer mode that was present in Patrician 3. Both Habib and GameSpot's Daniel Shannon felt that the ship combat was lacking, while Shannon praised the game's politics simulation. Shannon felt that fans of trading simulator games would enjoy the title but it would be unlikely to attract new fans. CGMagazine's Steven Loung called the game a "very dry affair" and said that it "just isn't fun."
