= Tortuga: Two Treasures =

2007 video game

- Developer: Ascaron Entertainment
- Publisher: CDV Software
- Platform: Microsoft Windows
- Release: EU: February 16, 2007; NA: March 12, 2007
- Genre: Action adventure
- Mode: Single-player

Tortuga: Two Treasures is an action-adventure video game developed by German studio Ascaron Entertainment and published by CDV Software for Microsoft Windows in 2007.

== Reception ==
Reception

Aggregate score
Aggregator	Score
Metacritic	48/100

Review scores
Publication	Score
4Players	69%
Eurogamer	4/10
Gamekult	3/10
GameSpot	4.8/10
GameSpy	2/5
GameZone	6/10
IGN	5/10
Jeuxvideo.com	11/20
PC Gamer (US)	56%
X-Play	2/5

The game received "generally unfavorable reviews" according to the review aggregation website Metacritic.
