= Sacred (video game) =

2004 video game

- Developer: Ascaron
- Publishers: GER: Take 2 Interactive; EU: Koch Media; NA: Encore; AU: Red Ant Enterprises; Linux Game Publishing (Linux)
- Designers: Aarne Jungerberg; Michael Bhatty; Franz Stradal; Hans-Arno Wegner
- Platforms: Microsoft Windows, Linux
- Release: Microsoft Windows: GER: 27 February 2004; EU: 19 March 2004; NA: 24 March 2004; Linux: WW: 9 April 2009
- Genre: Action role-playing
- Modes: Single-player, multiplayer

Sacred is a 2004 action role-playing game developed by the German company Ascaron and published by Take 2 Interactive. It is set on the magical continent of Ancaria, with characters of various races (dark elf, vampiress, dwarf, etc.) each with their own missions. Two expansion packs were released for the game in 2004 and 2005. In 2008, Linux Game Publishing announced that they would port the game to the Linux operating system.

Sacred was a commercial hit, with sales above 2 million units worldwide by 2009. It spawned the Sacred video game franchise, and was followed by the sequels Sacred 2: Fallen Angel, Sacred Citadel, and Sacred 3.

== Gameplay ==
=== Characters ===
Upon beginning the game, players are given a choice to start with one of six different character types: Gladiator, Dark Elf, Wood Elf, Vampiress, Battle-Mage, and Seraphim. The Daemon and Dwarf were additional characters added in the expansion Sacred Underworld and included in Sacred Gold.

Each character begins in a different part of the area around a town in Ancaria (the continent that Sacred takes place within), and with a different starting quest. For example, the Gladiator starts in a colosseum, enslaved by his master, while the Seraphim starts in a church. The Dark Elf starts on a cliff with a Wood Elf companion. Throughout the game, the characters all receive different sub-quests.

Each character class is also restricted to a certain set of items, and has a different set of skills. To increase these skill levels, characters must find runes that correspond to those skills, a rather novel system in contrast to the more mainstream model of skill points. Some character classes have identical skills, but the runes from one class cannot be used to advance skills in another class. Runes may be traded and used for crafting.

=== Items ===
Sacred features a vast array of items that can be obtained from shops, various containers (chests, barrels, graves...), dead monsters or "magical hiding places" in many of the rocks and bushes throughout Ancaria, which are indicated by a yellow sparkle. Many of the items can be only equipped by one type of character, like wings, which can only be equipped by a Seraphim.

There are also several potion types, such as the typical health heal, but there are other types, like Potions of Undead death, which stops Undead from reviving once players kill them, and "Potions of Concentration", which regenerate players' combo attacks so they can be used faster. There are no mana-heal potions in Sacred, because mana is not a feature of the game. Also, monsters occasionally drop a rune that increases a certain skill for a certain character, if used.

If the player owns a horse several different types of saddles can be bought to be used on it. These saddles increase the speed, defense, and damage done by the horse. Only one horse may be owned at a time, and the horse can be damaged and killed.

The names of items are in five different colors, (white, blue, yellow, brown, green) which represent different quality classes of equipment:

Sometimes, a monster drops a set item. Much like in Diablo II these set items will become much more powerful when gathered together and are very useful and sought after in multiplayer games. However, this is not to say that unique items are inferior to set items. Unique items are usually individually better than set items.

Some items also can be imbued with better stats. If players take an item with a number of "slots," indicated by small boxes in the inventory screen, they will be able to imbue it by taking it to a blacksmith and then using either jewellery, a rune, skeleton skull or one of the blacksmith's techniques on it up to as many times as there are slots in it. Once imbued players can remove one rune or piece of jewelry from it, but all other items in the slots are lost when they do this. Though players cannot use a rune or jewelry which is not of their class, they can socket it in an item to gain the benefit of its magical and possible stat-raising properties.

=== Skills ===
Every character in Sacred has a different set of skills that are available to them. The only way to obtain them is to find a rune of that particular skill and use it to make it available to use for players. Each character has between 11 and 22 different skills that can be unlocked and used. To increase their level in a skill, players must find another rune for that skill and use it. There are also several "combo masters" spread throughout Ancaria, which can combine up to four separate skills into a combo, which players can use in the game. The combo masters can also trade runes they cannot use or do not need for a rune of their choice.

== Plot ==
=== Setting ===
The whole of Sacred takes place on the continent of Ancaria, where there are several towns and villages to be visited. Even when players begin the game more than 70% of Ancaria is already available to be traveled on. To the south of Ancaria, there is a vast desert and lava-ridden plains. In the north, there is a wall of mountains and an icy backdrop. In both the east and the west there are large forests, blocking the way and stopping further travel. In the game there is an option to buy horses, which can be used for faster travel and to battle opponents, but will not affect players' ability to traverse difficult terrain in most situations.

=== Synopsis ===
A great Sakkara demon was conjured into existence by the necromancer Shaddar. The conjuring went wrong, and the Sakkara demon is now loose in the world of Ancaria. The heroes must find the five elements of Caesarian (wind, fire, earth, water, void), and use them to defeat the monster. They meet Prince Valor, and he thanks them for rescuing Wilbur and orders them to report to Baron DeMordre to bring reinforcements to stop the Orc invasion. The Baron betrays them and Wilbur is killed. With his dying breaths he warns the hero to report to the Prince that the Baron has betrayed them. The hero arrives at the orc invasion and finds most of Valor's troops have been slaughtered; only Sargent Treveille is left dying and tells the hero to find Baroness Vilyia - she knows where the prince is. They find Vilyia, and she leads them to Valor in the forest, where he and his surviving troops take refuge. Each hero has different objectives along the way, but eventually, they all lead up to this one final quest. After killing the traitor DeMordre and reclaiming the throne, the hero goes to the dungeon to summon the Sakkara demon and kills it. However, after claiming the heart of Ancaria, Shaddar reveals himself and captures Vilyia, and the hero pursues him into his castle to rescue Vilyia and defeat Shaddar.

== Production ==
The game was originally started by developer Ikarion as an adaptation of the role-playing game The Dark Eye. After Ikarion went defunct, Ascaron bought it out and continued the project with an original story, renaming it Sacred.

== Reception ==
=== Critical reviews ===
Reception

Aggregate scores
Aggregator	Score
GameRankings	76.38/100
Metacritic	73/100

Review scores
Publication	Score
1Up.com	B−
GameSpot	7.6
GameSpy	2/5
IGN	7.8/10
X-Play	3/5

Sacred garnered average to good reviews from the media. 1up called it "Diablo for masochists", while IGN called it "A diamond in the rough".

The editors of PC Gamer US presented Sacred with their "Best Roleplaying Game 2004" award. Greg Vederman of the magazine wrote that it "provides the loot addict with a deliciously strong dose of the good stuff."

=== Sales ===
Sacred was an immediate hit in the German market, where it opened as the top-selling full-price computer game of February 2004, according to Media Control. It remained in fourth place on the charts by April. Early that month, the game received a "Gold" certification from the Verband der Unterhaltungssoftware Deutschland (VUD), for sales of at least 100,000 units across Germany, Switzerland and Austria. Ascaron attributed Sacred's early momentum to its February launch date, as it had avoided competing with the major releases of the Christmas season. The game continued to chart in Media Control's top 10 through May, and in the top 20 through August.

By August 2004, Sacred had sold over 100,000 units in the United States and 400,000 units in Europe, of which 150,000 were sold in the German market. This performance led MCV GamesMarkt to declare Sacred a "global hit". Ultimately, Sacred was the German market's most successful full-price domestic computer game of 2004. Foreign competitors included, it placed fourth behind The Sims 2, Half-Life 2 and Need for Speed: Underground 2. In January 2005, the VUD upgraded Sacred to "Platinum" status, indicating 200,000 domestic sales.

According to GameStar, Sacred was a rare crossover hit for Germany, with significant sales volume outside German-speaking countries. The game sold above 1 million units across all markets by June 2005. This number rose to 1.5 million units by July 2006, when counting the sales of Sacred's expansion pack. By 2006, players in the United States had purchased 300,000 units of Sacred, while those in Spain accounted for 250,000 units. Spanish sales had topped 80,000 copies in the game's first 12 months, earning a "Platinum" award from the aDeSe. Sacred's worldwide sales surpassed 1.8 million copies by 2007. They broke 2 million by 2009.

== Expansion packs ==
=== Plus ===
Sacred Plus is a free expansion pack released in October 2004. It adds 2 regions, monsters, quests, items.

=== Underworld ===
Sacred Underworld is an expansion pack developed by Studio II Software and Ascaron Entertainment, and released in August 2005. Two new characters were added next to the six existing ones: Daemon and Dwarf. The story picks up after the events in Sacred, taking your character to the Underworld of Ancaria to rescue baroness Vilya.

On the review aggregator GameRankings, Underworld had an average score of 74% based on 12 reviews. On Metacritic, the game had an average score of 73 out of 100, based on 10 reviews — indicating mixed or average reviews. Underworld was a finalist for PC Gamer US's "Best Expansion Pack 2005" award, which ultimately went to RollerCoaster Tycoon 3: Soaked!.

Jason Ocampo of GameSpot gave Underworld a rating of 7.0 out of 10, saying the game is "an example of a Diablo-like action role-playing game taken to the extreme." Comparing the game to Sacred, Ocampo said it "offers more of the same, but at a ramped-up level." Ocampo said the game looks good but that "Hacking your way every 10 feet can be a chore." Ocampo also noted that it was nice that the game is set in a "predefined world, unlike the randomly generated levels of Diablo."

By May 2005, Underworld had sold 50,000 units in the German market, following its release in March.

=== Gold ===
Sacred Gold is a compilation released in August 2005. It contains the main game and the two expansions.

== Spin-off novel series ==
- Steve Whitton, Sacred: The Ancaria Chronicles I - Angel's Blood (Sacred: Die Chronik von Ancaria I – Engelsblut), October 2004, Panini, ISBN 3-8332-1149-0
- Steve Whitton, Sacred: The Ancaria Chronicles II - Star Dale (Sacred: Die Chronik von Ancaria II – Sternental), July 2006, Panini, ISBN 3-8332-1276-4
- Michael J. Parrish, Sacred: The Ancaria Chronicles III - The Elven Gate (Sacred: Die Chronik von Ancaria III – Das Elfentor), August 2006, Panini, ISBN 3-8332-1391-4

== See also ==
- Sacred 2: Fallen Angel, released in November 2008, is the prequel to Sacred.
- Sacred Citadel
- Sacred 3
- Video gaming in Germany
