= Bernhard von Reesen =

Polish merchant

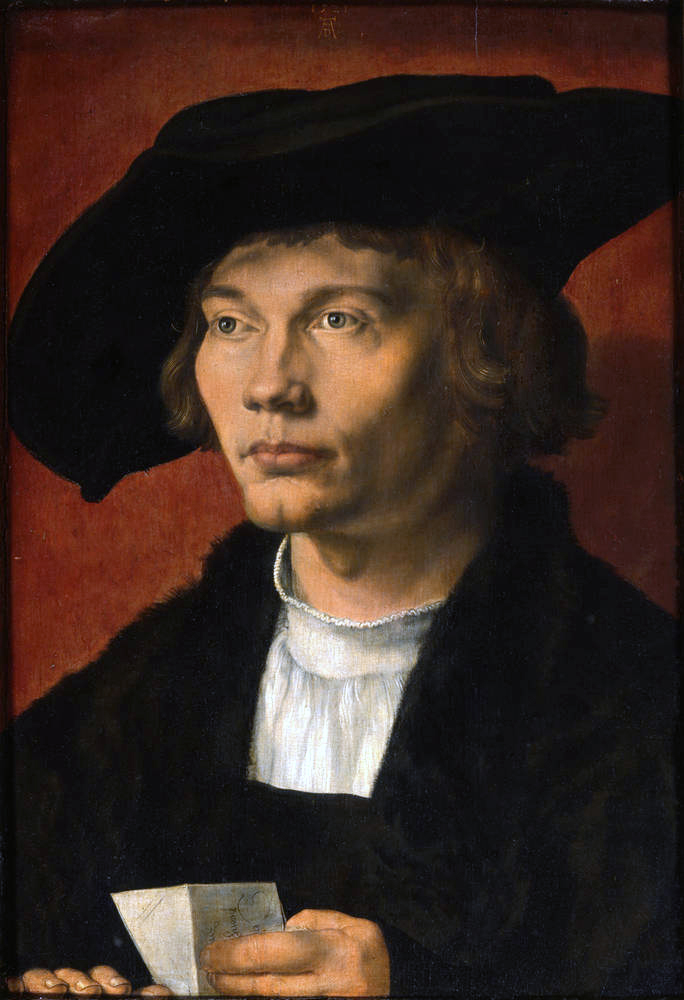
- Portrait of Bernhard von Reesen, 1521, by Albrecht Dürer. Gemäldegalerie Alte Meister
- Born: 1491; Danzig (Gdańsk)
- Died: October 1521 (aged 29–30)
- Occupation: Merchant
- Parent(s): Bernd von Reesen; Brigitte Proite

Bernhard von Reesen (1491 – 1521) was a successful merchant born to a patrician family in the Hanseatic city of Danzig (Gdańsk). The Reesen name, with its prefix "von" (of), indicates that the family had its origins in the city of Rees.

He was the son of Bernd von Reesen (c. 1460 – 1506) and Brigitte Proite (d. 1506) who were married in 1489. His younger brother Heinrich (1497 – 1532) was also a merchant; his eldest sister, Margarethe (b. 1490), married, in 1516, Hans (Johann) von Schwarzwald (1468 – 1521), an alderman of Danzig.

Reesen was highly educated as was the custom for men of his background at that time. The wealthy businessman was evidently one of a circle of merchants with whom Albrecht Dürer of Nuremberg and his wife were in regular contact while the artist was in Antwerp. In early 1521, when Reesen was about thirty, Dürer painted his portrait. The painting can be seen in the permanent exhibition of Old Masters in Dresden, Germany.

He died in October 1521, "tempore pestis" according to the chronicler, Stenzel Bornbach. The day, place and cause of his death are unknown.
