= Port Royale 2 =

2004 video game

- Developers: Ascaron Entertainment; Elkware (Mobile)
- Publishers: EU: Take-Two Interactive; NA: Tri-Synergy; JP: Capcom; WW: Elkware (Mobile)
- Designer: Daniel Dumont
- Programmer: Bernd Ludewig
- Platforms: Windows, Mobile game
- Release: Windows: GER: April 30, 2004; EU: September 10, 2004; NA: September 13, 2004; Mobile; October 30, 2004
- Genre: Business simulation game
- Mode: Single-player

Port Royale 2 is the sequel to the business simulation game Port Royale: Gold, Power and Pirates. It is set in the Caribbean during the 17th century. Created by Ascaron Entertainment in 2004, it combines a business simulator with real-time battles and towns that can be owned, built, developed or razed. A sequel, Port Royale 3: Pirates & Merchants, was released in 2012.

== Gameplay ==
Port Royale 2 is an open-ended game, so the player can choose to pursue any career they wish. This could range from a business tycoon to a pirate. Initially, the player must trade goods between Caribbean colonies to make money, but over the long term they can have substantial business interests in many Caribbean ports, and support large fighting fleets.

As a business tycoon, the player trades with towns to gain their friendship, and can then buy building permits to establish businesses there. Ultimately, the player can even come to have their own town, but this can take a very long time.

As a buccaneer (with a Letter of Marque), the player can attack any of the four colonial nations in the Caribbean circa 1600; from largest to smallest: Spain, England, France, and The Netherlands. If they have not acquired a Letter of Marque, every nation will see them as an enemy - they are a pirate.

Ships in this game range from a small Pinnace to a massive ship of the line. There are also missions the player can complete for money, supplies, or improved relations. At higher levels they can also automate the game to some degree, by setting up trade routes that their trading fleets will follow from town to town.

True to history, home-country politics are fickle and impact the game: One year the player might choose to be loyal to Spain and fight England–but a year later, might join the Dutch in their fight against the French.

Famous pirates of the age also make appearances. These sea wolves are likely to attack any ship or town that they please, including those that belong to the player. They usually operate from heavily fortified bases, but if you defeat them, you'll gain favor with any nation you choose.

Initially, you have operating constraints (how many fleets you may have and how many towns you can buy building permits in), but as you gain levels (based on net worth), you can have unlimited fleets and permits.

== Reception ==
Reception

Aggregate score
Aggregator	Score
Metacritic	75/100

Review scores
Publication	Score
Computer Gaming World	3.5/5
GamesMaster	60%
GameSpot	8.3/10
GameSpy	4/5
GameZone	7.4/10
IGN	7.5/10
Jeuxvideo.com	10/20
PC Format	71%
PC Gamer (US)	60%
PC Zone	75%

The PC version received "generally favorable reviews" according to the review aggregation website Metacritic. PC Format found the game unremarkable, stating that it "...passes the time, but gets old fast." IGN was slightly more positive, saying that the game is "...a solid if unremarkable game." Because the game has an open ending, IGN said it had "good replay value as you can take different career paths each time you play." The game received praise from Ron Dulin of Computer Gaming World, who stated that: "...it's a continually engaging experience." However, he disliked the pace at the beginning, saying, "Port Royale 2 is somewhat slow to start. It can take a long time to earn enough money..." GameSpot said, "Port Royale 2 might focus more on building shipping cartels than sea battles and swordplay, but its brilliantly realized design is more than just number crunching."

The game received a "Gold" award from the Asociación Española de Distribuidores y Editores de Software de Entretenimiento, indicating sales above 40,000 units in Spain during its first 12 months.
