= Port Royal Bay, Bermuda =

Bay in Bermuda

Coordinates: 32°16′N 64°51′W

Port Royal Bay is located in the western end of Horseshoe Bay in Bermuda.
