= Ocean Trader =

Board game

Box cover and game board

Ocean Trader is a board game published by Clipper Games Ltd in 1988 that simulates global trade via clipper ship in the 19th century.

== Description ==
Ocean Trader is a game in which 2–6 players all start the game with an empty clipper ship docked in Liverpool. Five commodity cards are revealed that identify needed commodities, where each is located, and the port that requires each one. Players roll dice to move their ships to a port with a needed commodity, where they purchase the commodity and then transport it to the port requiring the commodity. Speed is very important, since only the first two players to arrive with the needed commodity can make a profit: the first player to arrive is paid four times the purchase price. The second player is paid twice the purchase amount.

Players can sail to ports to pick up unneeded commodity on speculation, hoping that a commodity card will be revealed that requires their cargo. Players can also buy up to two more ships, and there are also ten shares that can be purchased.

=== Victory conditions ===
Once one player has acquired a majority of the ten shares and declares it, the game lasts for 12 more turns. At the end of that period, the player holding a majority of the shares as well as £750 and at least one ship is the winner. Optionally, the players can predetermine the length of the game from the start, and the player with the most cash at that point is the winner.

== Publication history ==
Clipper Games Ltd. (not to be confused with Clipper, the Dutch subsidiary of Parker Brothers in the 1970s) was a British company based in Portsmouth. Although reviewer Brian Walker noted that the company planned to create a series of family games, Ocean Trader was their only product, a 1988 board game designed by John Rudford.

In 1996, Software 2000 created Ocean Trader, a DOS computer game based on the same principles of global shipping but updated to the twentieth century. The computer game is considerably more complex than the original board game, with rules for taking out loans, shipping goods for other players, designing new ships, and balancing speed versus fuel costs.

== Reception ==
Brian Walker reviewed the original board game for Games International magazine, and called it "quite fun to play", but noted that "some of the rules could so with tightening up." He thought the game lasted too long, pointing out that the 12-turn rule to end the game "leads to the game lasting far beyond its natural life." He concluded by giving it an average rating of 3 out of 5, stating "With a few rule modifications [...] Ocean Trader could be a fun game for 2-6 old or young salts aged 9 and up with a couple of hours to spare."

== Review ==
- Financial Times
