= Big Scale Racing =

2002 video game

- Developer: BumbleBeast
- Publisher: HD Interactive
- Platform: Microsoft Windows
- Release: NA: August 16, 2002
- Genre: Racing

Big Scale Racing is a 2002 racing video game by BumbleBeast.

== Development ==
The studio began as a subsidiary of digital company Virtual Environments Systems & Consultancy (VESC), which was spun-off to create PC CD-ROM games on April 1, 2001. The company consisted of seven employees, which created scale models of racing cars (90 cm long) for the racing game. The company anticipated an Autumn 2002 launch date, and aimed to distribute the game to big retailers and entertainment shops over the world, while accepting online orders over the Internet.

The company started production on February 9, 2001. In Spring of that year, BumbleBeast signed license agreements with various race tracks to have the tracks featuring in current and future games. The company hired cartoon artist Patrick Schoenmaker on June 1, his debut video game. An internal beta was released on August 2, followed by an internal demo on September 9. The BumbleBeast website - premiering content about the game - was uploaded September 14. Summitsoft (Omaha) signed a publishing/distribution deal for the North American continent on March 10, 2002. On March 12, an August release date for retail was set. Weather effects were added March 28. In response to beta and demo testers regarding Multiplayer LAN, developers announced 8 player LAN gaming on April 1, 2002. On April 11, Dutch company HD Interactive signed a publishing/distribution deal for Europe. A public demo was released April 14.

On April 18, Japanese company Aqua Systems signed a publishing/distribution deal for Japan. On May 25, Summitsoft and HD-Interactive presented the game at E3. By June 14, the US/Canada version of BSR was set for the second week of August 2002, the EU version was set for September 20, and the Japanese version was set for mid August. On July 10 it was announced the game would have dedicated versions in Spanish, Dutch, Russian, Japanese, French, German and English. On July 7, QVSoftware signed a distribution deal for release in Australia/New Zealand for early October 2002. On July 28 it was announced that in the previous week 50 thousand demos were downloaded from various sites. First screenshots were released on July 31. On August 16, the game was released in the US, and in the online stores Navarre, EB Games, and Amazon. An estimated 1,500,000 downloads of the demo occurred from August–October. A special edition of the game (Big Scale Racing Special Edition) was released in 2003.

== Gameplay ==
Players race with 1/5 scale RC racing cars. The game features weather, multiple tracks and cars, and internet competition.

== Reception ==
Reception

Aggregate score
Aggregator	Score
Metacritic	60/100

Review scores
Publication	Score
Computer Games Magazine	2.5/5
GameSpot	6.1/10
GameSpy	3/5
GameZone	5/10
IGN	6.5/10
PC Gamer (UK)	67%
PC Gamer (US)	75%

Eurogamer thought in its hands-on preview that the game was a serious simulator but also fun and playable. On release, the game received "mixed" reviews according to the review aggregation website Metacritic.
