= Port Royal, Newfoundland and Labrador =

Coordinates: 47.5275°N 54.0977778°W

Location of Port Royal in Newfoundland and Labrador

Port Royal is an abandoned settlement in Newfoundland and Labrador.

The town was sustained by fisheries, and, at its height, had a population of 80-100 people. In the early 1960s, the population was resettled. A reunion was held in 1993, and the town is inhabited during the summer. It is located on Long Island, Placentia Bay, close to Harbour Buffett.

== See also ==
- List of ghost towns in Newfoundland and Labrador
