= Bot Soccer =

1996 video game

- Developer: CAPS Software AG
- Publisher: Expert Software
- Platforms: MS-DOS, Windows
- Release: NA: 1996
- Genre: Simulation
- Modes: Single-player, multiplayer

Bot Soccer is a simulation video game released in 1996 for MS-DOS and Microsoft Windows. It was developed by CAPS Software AG and published by Expert Software. Bot Soccer is a futuristic version of soccer played with a "cybercan" instead of a ball.
