= Portrait of Bernhart von Reesen =

1521 painting by Albrecht Dürer

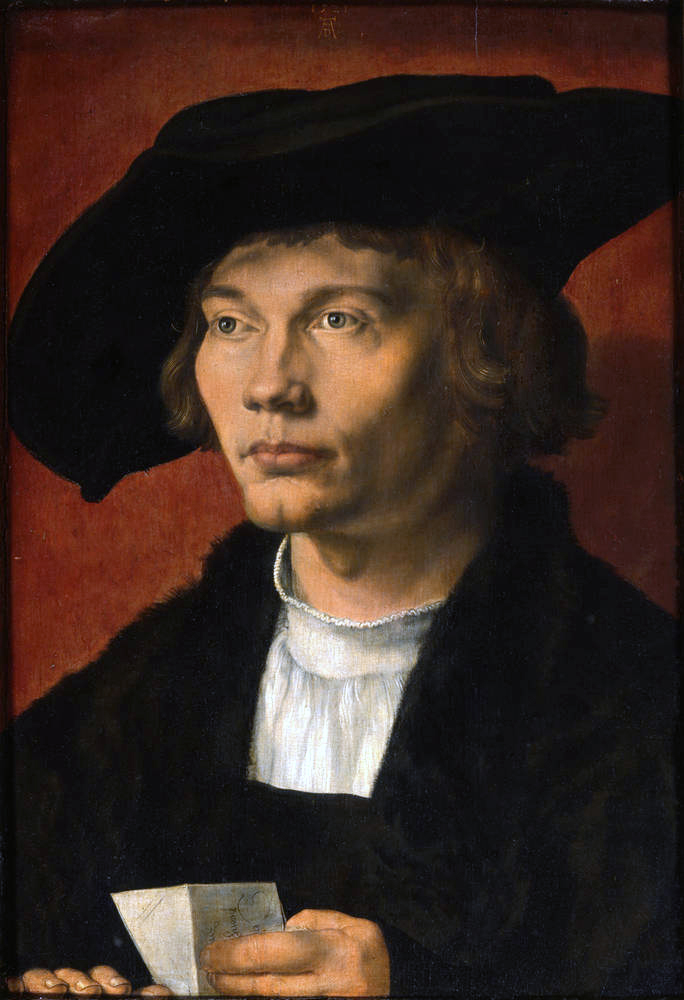
- Artist: Albrecht Dürer
- Year: 1521
- Medium: Oil on panel
- Dimensions: 46 cm × 32 cm (18 in × 13 in)
- Location: Gemäldegalerie Alte Meister, Dresden, Dresden

The Portrait of Bernhart von Reesen is a portrait painting by German Renaissance master Albrecht Dürer. It depicts a man wearing a beret and holding a piece of paper against a red background. The oil on panel painting is dated 1521 and is in the collection of the Gemäldegalerie Alte Meister of Dresden, Germany.

== Background and details ==
The painting was executed during the artist's trip to the Low Countries in the period 1520–1521. On 16 March 1521, Dürer wrote in his diary that he had portrayed in Antwerp one Bernhart von Reesen, for which he was paid eight florins and some small gifts for his wife and maid.

The sitter is portrayed wearing black garments and a white shirt. His hands, which, according to the Flemish painting tradition, are cut off on the lower border, hold a small piece of paper with writing on it. Dürer's portrait mixes traits of Netherlandish portraiture tradition with the Venetian tradition.

The sitter is shown in three-quarter profile set against a red background. The portrait which shows the sitter from close up accentuates the bright face and the large beret. The face is angular but softened through delicate modelling. Von Reesen is depicted as powerful and confident but his gaze turned to the left in the distance gives his pose at the same time a contemplative quality. The composition is dominated by diagonal lines which give the portrait an intense quality.

== Identification of the sitter ==
The sitter for the portrait has been identified on the basis of the letter he is holding in his hands and the entry in Dürer's diary. Although the writing is hard to make out, it has been determined that the man should be identified with Bernhard von Reesen. Von Reesen was a successful merchant from Gdańsk who was living in Antwerp at the time. He was thirty years old when the portrait was painted. He died the same year.

Some scholars have identified the sitter in the past with the Flemish painter Bernard van Orley from Brussels whom Dürer met during his stay in Brussels. This view was debunked in 1972 by Dr. Erna Brand who conclusively showed that the sitter was in fact Bernhard von Reesen.

== See also ==
- List of paintings by Albrecht Dürer
