= Southend Interactive =

Sweden video game developer

Southend Interactive was a Swedish video game developer based in Malmö and founded in 1998. Southend worked on game productions from various genres that run from various clients, such as Ubisoft and Sierra Online. They also created games for Microsoft's Xbox Live Arcade service on the Xbox 360. The company slogan was "Tomorrow's experiences today".

Southend closed in June 2013 when Ubisoft Massive acquired Southend's 24 developers and some technology to be used in Massive's Tom Clancy's The Division, a massively multiplayer online game. Southend had been seeking a suitor and partially blamed its publisher Deep Silver for the company's closure.

== Games ==
| Year | Title | Platform(s) |
|---|---|---|
| 2002 | Deathrow | Xbox |
| 2003 | XIII | Xbox |
| 2006 | The Da Vinci Code 3D | Mobile phones |
| 2008 | Commanders: Attack of the Genos | Xbox 360 (XBLA) |
| 2009 | R-Type Dimensions | Xbox 360 (XBLA) |
| 2009 | Lode Runner | Xbox 360 (XBLA) |
| 2009 | Xtrakt | Windows Mobile |
| 2009 | Experiment 13 | Windows Mobile, Android |
| 2010 | Tecmo Bowl Throwback | Xbox 360 (XBLA), PlayStation 3 (PSN) |
| 2010 | ilomilo | Windows Phone, Xbox 360 (XBLA), Windows |
| 2013 | Sacred Citadel | Xbox 360 (XBLA), PlayStation 3 (PSN), Windows |
| Cancelled | Brisby & Donnovan | N/A |
