= InnoGames =

German video game developer

InnoGames GmbH
- Type: Subsidiary
- Industry: Video game industry
- Founded: 2007; 19 years ago in Stade, Germany
- Founder: Hendrik Klindworth; Michael Zillmer; Eike Klindworth
- Headquarters: Hamburg, Germany
- Key people: Christian Reshöft (CEO), Michael Lenz (CBO), Sebastian Goldt (CMO)
- Revenue: €220 million (2020)
- Number of employees: 350 (2024)
- Parent: Modern Times Group
- Website: innogames.com

InnoGames GmbH is a German video game developer and publisher based in Hamburg. Founded in 2007, it focuses on the development of free-to-play online browser and mobile games. The company reached a turnover of €220 million in 2020 and currently has ten live games.

== History ==
In 2003, founders Eike and Hendrik Klindworth and Michael Zillmer created and released the browser-based massively multiplayer online game Tribal Wars as a hobby project. By 2005, the real-time strategy game had tens of thousands of players. Due to the success, the three founders decided to work full-time on the development and publishing of browser games. In early 2006, they rented an office in their hometown Stade, wrote a business plan, and soon after hired their first full-time employees. The goal: to market Tribal Wars internationally.

In early 2007, InnoGames GmbH was founded to handle the operation, continued development and marketing of Tribal Wars. In the same year, InnoGames moved into new offices in Harburg, Hamburg with a total of 17 employees. At that time, the company's second browser game, The West, was already in development. In April 2008, the role-playing game set in the Wild West was released.

In the fall of 2009, InnoGames moved within Harburg to be able to grow beyond 50 employees. In September 2009, the company's new empire-building browser game Grepolis started into an open beta with a limited number of users.

In April 2010, InnoGames founded InnoGames Korea, a subsidiary specifically for the Asian market. In May, the entry of investor Fidelity Growth Partners Europe (FGPE) was announced. In July, the company announced the launch of the open beta test of the Facebook game WestWars, based on The West. This was followed in August by the open beta of the fantasy role-playing game Seven Lands and the announcement of Tribonia, a client-based fantasy PC game developed by Japanese studio Rosso Index, for which InnoGames had acquired exclusive rights for Europe and North America.

In February 2011, InnoGames launched innogames.com, a central gaming portal for its approximately 60 million registered users at that time. In addition, the company announced the following day that it would in future be advised by Gerhard Florin as Chairman. He had most recently worked at Electronic Arts as Executive Vice President of Publishing. August saw the launch of the open beta test of Bounty Hounds Online, a client-based science fiction PC game developed by Taiwanese studio Xpec Entertainment, for which InnoGames had acquired rights for Europe.

The year 2012 began with the news that InnoGames would be taking SevenLands offline by the end of May at the latest. In April 2012, InnoGames launched the open beta of its empire-building browser game Forge of Empires.

In February 2013, InnoGames announced the opening of a new location in São Paulo, to further expand its market position in South America. In July, InnoGames announced that it was discontinuing work on the browser-based 3D seafarer simulation Kartuga and at the same time closing the development studio Ticking Bomb Games. As reasons, the company cited quality deficiencies and a lack of fit with its overall cross-platform play strategy. In September, InnoGames published Grepolis for iOS, followed by an Android version in October.

In March 2014, InnoGames moved to new offices with room for 500 staff in Hamburg Hammerbrook, where the company still resides today. In May, the company published the iPad version of Forge of Empires. Also in May 2014, the release of the strategy game Rising Generals for iOS, Android and browser was announced. September saw the launch of the browser open beta of Tribal Wars 2, the official sequel of InnoGames' debut game, and the launch of Forge of Empire's iPhone version In November, the company communicated the launch of the Android version of Tribal Wars 2 and that Lagoonia would be taken offline in December.

In January 2015, the company opened a new mobile game development studio in Düsseldorf and announced the shutdown of Rising Generals. March saw the release of Forge of Empire's Android version. In May, InnoGames announced the browser version of its fantasy strategy game Elvenar. In June, Tribal Wars 2 was published for iOS.

In March 2016, the Düsseldorf studio was complemented by the three founders of Oberhausen-based developer Funatics and their team. In October, Swedish media company Modern Times Group (MTG) acquired a total of 35% from InnoGames' founders and former investor Eight Roads Ventures (formerly FGPE), based on an enterprise value of €260 million.

In February 2017, InnoGames announced the purchase of the turn-based strategy mobile game Warlords, which had been produced by the Berlin-based developer studio Wooga. In May, MTG announced an increase in its stake to 51% of the shares through an investment of a further €82.6 million. In September, Warlords was relaunched under the name Warlords of Aternum. In November 2017, the mobile versions of Elvenar were released.

In June 2018, InnoGames announced that it would close its Düsseldorf studio by the end of the year and shift production to Hamburg.

In February 2019, InnoGames announced the release of its turn-based strategy game God Kings for iOS and Android devices. By November, the company had surpassed one billion euros in total lifetime revenues.

At the end of 2020, MTG increased its stake in InnoGames to 68%. The transaction also included the establishment of the gaming group MTG Gaming AB ("GamingCo"). The InnoGames founders held approximately 28% of the shares in GamingCo at that time.

In January 2021, InnoGames announced the discontinuation of God Kings. In February, the company issued its last financial press release to date. In it, revenues for the year 2020 were put at 220 million euros. Also in February, an interview with games medium 80lv revealed that InnoGames had put Lost Survivors, a survival game for mobile devices, into soft launch.

In January 2022, InnoGames announced the worldwide commercial release of the mobile-first city-building game Rise of Cultures for iOS and Android. In contrast to the PvP focus of Forge of Empires, Rise of Cultures focuses on PvE. The worldwide commercial launch of Sunrise Village, another mobile-first game, followed in February. With the exploration and farming simulation, InnoGames added a new genre to its game portfolio. In July, InnoGames became the first German games company to publish its salary bands. Among other things, the company cited the invalidation of existing prejudices against remuneration in the gaming industry and greater employer attractiveness for female employees as well as employees from outside the industry as the motivation for this step. In October, the browser version of Rise of Cultures was released.

In April 2023, German games business medium GamesWirtschaft reported that a game developed by InnoGames entitled Heroes of Fate and Fortune had entered soft launch. On the occasion of the game's 20th anniversary, the company announced in June that Tribal Wars had generated total sales of more than €180 million. In August, InnoGames communicated the launch Sunrise Village's browser version and that Forge of Empires had reached the €1 billion lifetime revenue mark. At the end of August, Warlords of Aternum went offline.

In September 2024, the company announced the global launch of its new title Heroes of History, a combination of City-Builder and Hero Collection RPG for iOS and Android. At the same time, InnoGames announced as part of the 15th anniversary of Grepolis that the title had now exceeded the €200 million mark in total lifetime sales. In November, the company released the browser version of Heroes of History. In the same month, GamesWirtschaft reported that Heroes of Fate and Fortune, which had remained unannounced, had been discontinued. The same article also mentioned that a new InnoGames title called Food Fight TD: Tower Defense is planned for 2025.

In March 2025, GamesWirtschaft shared that Food Fight TD: Tower Defense had since been sold to the Flensburg-based Neox Studios. On the occasion of the 10th anniversary of Elvenar, InnoGames shared in April that the game has generated a total of more than 200 million euros. In May, players of Lost Survivors were informed that the game, which had remained unannounced, will be taken offline on July 15. In July, InnoGames announced that it had reached €2 billion in company lifetime revenues. Christian Reshöft, who had previously served as Chief Product Officer, was appointed the new CEO in October. Hendrik Klindworth, who had led the company’s operations since its founding, transitioned to the role of Chairman of the Board and also assumed a leadership role at InnoGames’ parent company, MTG. In December, Cozy Coast, the first casual game in the portfolio, was released worldwide.

== Live games ==
Year (Release)	Title	Current Platform(s)
2003	Tribal Wars	Android, Browser, iOS
2008	The West	Browser
2009	Grepolis	Android, Browser, iOS
2012	Forge of Empires	Android, Browser, iOS
2014	Tribal Wars 2	Android, Browser, iOS
2015	Elvenar	Android, Browser, iOS
2022	Rise of Cultures	Android, Browser, iOS
2022	Sunrise Village	Android, Browser, iOS
2024	Heroes of History	Android, Browser, iOS
2025	Cozy Coast	Android, iOS

== Discontinued games ==
Year (Discontinuation)	Title	Platform(s)
-	WestWars	Facebook
2011	Tribonia	PC (PC Client)
2011	Bounty Hounds Online	PC (PC Client)
2012	Seven Lands	Browser
2013	Kartuga	Browser
2013	Lagoonia	Browser
2015	Rising Generals	Android, Browser, iOS
2019	God Kings	Android, iOS
2023	Warlords of Aternum	Android, iOS
2023 or 2024	Heroes of Fate and Fortune	Android, iOS
2025	Lost Survivors	Android, iOS

== Awards ==
Heroes of History:

- 2025 – Nomination for the GamingonPhone Awards in the category "Best Mobile Game"

Rise of Cultures:

- 2023 – Nomination for the German Computer Games Awards (Deutscher Computerspielpreis) in the category "Best Mobile Game"

Forge of Empires:

- 2012 – Nomination for the European Games Award in the category "Best European Browser Game"
- 2012 – Nominations for the Deutscher Entwicklerpreis (Deutscher Entwicklerpreis) in the categories "Best Game Design" and "Best Browser Game"
- 2013 – Winner at the Deutscher Computerspielpreis awards in the category "Best Browser Game"
- 2013 – Winner at the MMO of the Year-Award in the category "Best Strategy Browser MMO" (Jury Award)
- 2019 – Nomination at the Deutscher Entwicklerpreis (Deutscher Entwicklerpreis) in the category "Evergreen"

Grepolis:

- 2009 – Nominations for the Deutscher Entwicklerpreis (Deutscher Entwicklerpreis) in the categories "Best Strategy Game" and "Best German Browser Game"
- 2010 – Nomination for the Bäm! Computec Games Award in the category "Online- or Browser Game"
- 2011 – Nomination for the European Games Award in the category "Best European Browser Game"
- 2012 – Winner of the MMO of the Year Award in the category "Best Classic Browser MMO" (Jury Award)

Tribal Wars:

- 2006 – Winner of the GalaxyNews Browser Game of the Year Award in the category "Gaming Fun" (Audience Award)
- 2006 – Winner of the MMO of the Year Award in the category "Best Gameplay" (Audience Award)

Seven Lands:

- 2010/11 – Winner of the MMO of the Year Award in the category "Best Role-playing" (Jury Award)

The West:

- 2008 – Winner of the MMO of the Year Award in the categories "Browser Game of the Year" (Jury Award), "Best Game Design" (Jury Award), "Best Gameplay" (Jury Award) and "Best Role-playing" (Jury award)
- 2010/11 – Winner of the MMO of the Year Award in the category "Best Game Expansion" (Audience Award)
