= Sacred 2: Fallen Angel =

2008 video game

- Standard edition cover art (Windows)
- Developer: Ascaron
- Publishers: cdv Software Entertainment; Deep Silver
- Designer: Bob Bates
- Composers: Dynamedion; Blind Guardian (Theme music); Pedro Macedo Camacho (Additional music)
- Series: Sacred
- Platforms: Microsoft Windows, PlayStation 3, Xbox 360
- Release: Microsoft Windows: GER: 2 October 2008; EU: 7 November 2008; NA: 11 November 2008; PlayStation 3, Xbox 360: NA: 12 May 2009; EU: 5 June 2009
- Genre: Action role-playing
- Modes: Single-player, multiplayer

Sacred 2: Fallen Angel is a 2008 action role-playing game and the second in the Sacred video game series. It is a prequel which takes place 2,000 years before the events of Sacred. Like its predecessor, the game takes place in a fantasy setting. A new game engine allows the game to be rendered in perspective correct 3D, while retaining the viewpoint found in older isometric games. Game designer Bob Bates was involved in its production. Power metal band Blind Guardian wrote the song "Sacred Worlds" as the theme for the game and also make an appearance as characters.

The PC version was released in late 2008, the console versions were delayed until May 2009. In April, developer Ascaron went into administration, citing the extended development as the reason. An add-on titled Ice & Blood was released 2 October for European PC players only. Support for the American PC version was taken over by Deep Silver, though all support for current and future expansions and console versions in the US was dropped.

Sacred 2 was remastered on 11 November 2025.

== Plot ==
A mysterious and volatile substance called T-Energy is the source of all life and magic in Ancaria. It was originally solely under the control of the ancient race of Seraphim. However, over time as they lost interest in the world they gave some of their control to the High Elves. With this power, the High Elves quickly became the dominant race of Ancaria.

A power struggle is raging between two factions within the High Elves. The nobility and clergy are each trying to gain control over the T-Energy. Other races take advantage of the distraction the conflict provides and try to gain control of the T-Energy themselves, so they can become the dominant and most powerful race. As these events unfold, the T-Energy goes increasingly out of control and changes into a destructive force that mutates creatures, destroys cities, and renders entire regions uninhabitable. The campaign selection you make will determine whether your story involves healing the land, or intensifying the chaos.

== Gameplay ==
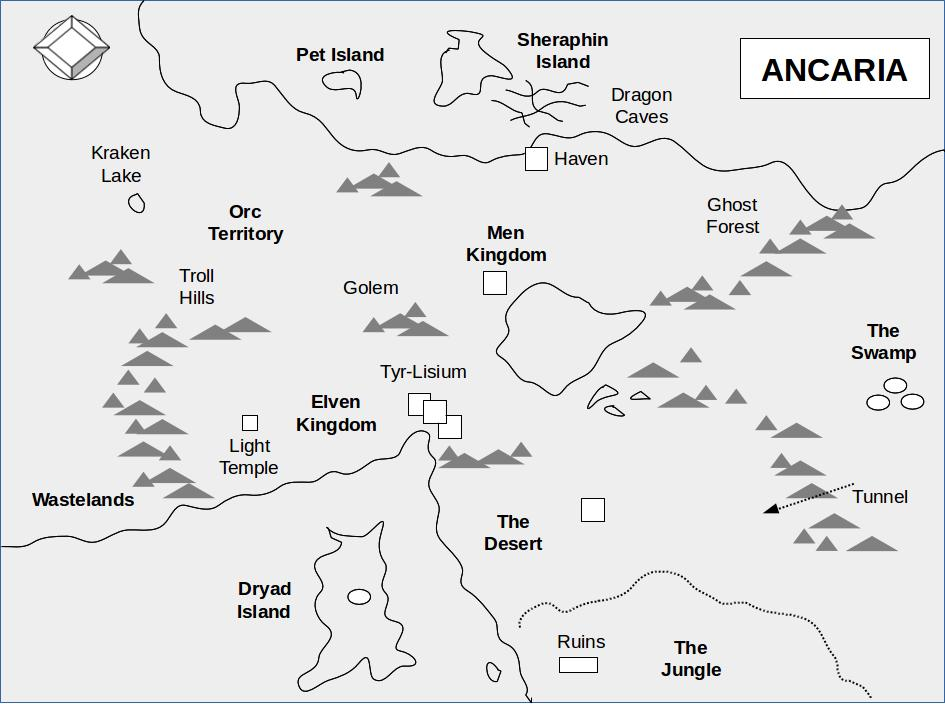
Ancaria, map of the world

=== Campaigns ===
There are two campaign path choices: Light and Shadow. The player will select the path they want to follow at the beginning of the game, and this choice determines the ultimate goal of their character. Throughout the game, the paths intersect at different points. In one path you may be asked to help defend a town, while in the other you may be the person attacking the town.

=== World ===
Sacred 2: Fallen Angel features minimal loading times between regions. The surface map is 22 square miles (57 km^{2}). The world also contains dungeons and caves going as far as 2 levels deep, and surface dwellings of up to four stories. Most of the action takes place in the open world above ground.

There are a variety of different regions, from arid desert to tropical rain forest. Every region differs in its climate, terrain, architecture, inhabitants, flora, fauna and lighting.

In addition to playable characters and enemies, there are different neutral creatures who inhabit the various regions, as well as enemies and NPCs (non-player characters).

NPCs are constructed to behave realistically within the Day/Night cycle. For example, merchants will be at home at night.

=== Classes ===
There are 7 playable fixed-gender classes, each of which has different class-specific equipment and animations that are dependent on the weapons being wielded. Maximum character level will be at least 200.

- Seraphim: The Seraphim is the only class from Sacred that appears in Sacred 2: Fallen Angel. She embodies all that is good, and therefore she can only play the Light path.
- Shadow Warrior: An elite warrior, returned to life against his will after his death on the battlefield.
- High Elf: A student of magic, freshly emerged from the academy ready to explore the world and expand her knowledge.
- Dryad: Adept at ranged combat, nature magic and voodoo.
- Temple Guardian: Cyborg canine creature - adept at the mechanical and technological arts.
- Inquisitor: He embodies all that is evil, and therefore can only play the Shadow path.
- Dragon Mage

=== Mounts ===
Players are able to use horses as they could in Sacred, for transportation as well as in combat. Though players can engage in combat while riding a horse, they cannot execute Combat Arts, Sacred's version of special moves. Mounts do, however, add to character stats - acting as an additional equipment slot. Each class also has access to a special unique mount type via a quest, that allows the use of Combat Arts whilst mounted, and even improves some of them.

=== Quests ===
Ancaria has a variety of quest types. Current figures indicate that there will be 100 core campaign quests as well as 600 side quests. The side quests will include character specific quests, as well as quest related to the specific deity you choose when creating your character.

=== Customization ===
Character customization is accomplished in a variety of ways. In addition the choice of using a mount or not, and if so which, there is a wide variety of equipment and weapon types; the game features an RPG-standard set of equipment options.

Equipment can be generated with dozens of modifiers as well as sockets and both dropped and bought equipment is predominantly class-specific.

Players can modify their characters further by allocating stat points, choosing from a range of overarching skills which improve their special powers (combat arts), allow them to barter with NPCs or use different types of weapons. Players can also increase the level of their individual combat arts, pick and choose combat arts to execute together in "combos" and even further customize individual combat arts with additional effects.

=== Multiplayer ===
Sacred 2's multiplayer mode features "hot-swapping" capabilities, which allow players to leave their single-player campaign, join a friend's game in multiplayer, then return to their single player campaign at the point they left off while retaining any levels and items that they received while in their friend's multiplayer game.

All platforms allow a variety of game modes, with five distinct multiplayer modes, with the maximum number of players varying based on the platform and game type:

- Microsoft Windows: Maximum of 16 players per game for PvP or free play, and 5 players (PvE - player(s) versus environment) for the campaign co-op mode.
- PlayStation 3: Maximum of 4 players via PlayStation Network, or 2 offline.
- Xbox 360: Maximum of 4 players via Xbox Live, or 2 offline.

== Release ==
Sacred 2 was released in late 2008 for Microsoft Windows. The console versions for Xbox 360 and PlayStation 3 were delayed until 2009 with the discs being pressed in April 2009 for a May release. All versions contain the same content, with the exception of the Xbox 360 pre-order. If pre-ordered at GameStop, a code was given to access a creature that allows access to inventory storage anywhere in the world as long as both players are signed into Xbox Live. It is also available to purchase as DLC. The main difference is in the UI, which has been designed in attempt to allow optimal control for the hardware differences of each platform.

In April, developer Ascaron went into administration, citing the extended development as the reason. Support for the US PC version was taken over by CDV, though all support for current and future expansions and console versions in the US was dropped.

After the end of official support, the game's community continued support themself with community patches.

== Ice & Blood ==
An expansion pack titled Ice & Blood was released 28 August 2009 for European PC players only, however Sacred 2 Gold, released on Steam, would bring Ice & Blood to American PC players as well. Expanding the world of Ancaria, Ice & Blood features two new regions, a new playable character and many new items, enemies, weapons and missions.

== Reception ==
Reviews
Publication	Score
PC
Eurogamer	6/10
GameSpot	7/10
Game Informer	7/10
IGN	7.5/10
Game Revolution	C+
GameSpy	2/5
Xbox 360 and PlayStation 3
Official Xbox Magazine	7.5/10
1UP	A-
IGN	6.5/10
GameSpot	7/10
Game Informer	7.75/10
Game Revolution	B
GameTrailers	5.3/10

In January 2009, Sacred 2 received a "Gold" certification from the Bundesverband Interaktive Unterhaltungssoftware (BIU), indicating sales of at least 100,000 units in the German market. The game's worldwide sales surpassed 750,000 units by August 2009.

The PC version of Sacred 2 received mixed reviews with an average critic score of 71% at GameRankings, and 71 out of 100 at Metacritic. While the design, world map and multiplayer were praised, common criticisms were directed at the visuals and technical glitches, as well as the lack of character customization and mostly female, gender-fixed classes. The later release of the Xbox 360 and PS3 versions scored a 71% and a 70% on GameRankings, respectively. While some critical issues were found and fixed in the PC version, there were a lot more problems in the PS3 and Xbox 360 version which were never fixed.

== Sequel ==
In August 2009, Deep Silver announced their plans for a sequel with a working title Sacred 3. The game was released in August 2014.

== Spin-off novels ==
- A. D. Portland, Sacred 2: The Shadow Warrior - The official past story (Sacred 2: Der Schattenkrieger – die offizielle Vorgeschichte zum Game) December 2007, Panini, ISBN 3-8332-1572-0
- A. D. Portland, Sacred 2: Fallen Angel - The novelization (Sacred 2: Fallen Angel – Der offizielle Roman zum Videogame), Panini Verlag, August 2008, ISBN 3-8332-1739-1
