= Hanse - Die Expedition =

1994 business simulation video game

Hanse: Die Expedition
- Developer(s): Ascon
- Platform(s): DOS, Amiga
- Release: 1994

Hanse: Die Expedition is a strategic business simulation game released in 1994 by Ascon.The game was not released in an English-language version.

== Gameplay and plot ==
The player is a trader in the 13th Century, in the German seaport town of Lübeck. The aim is to become mayor of Lübeck within 250 turns.
