= Port Royale 3: Pirates & Merchants =

2012 video game

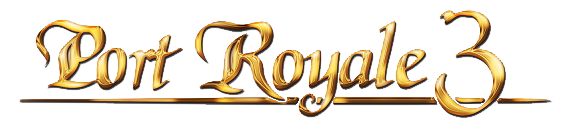
- Developer: Gaming Minds Studios
- Publisher: Kalypso Media
- Platforms: Windows, Xbox 360, PlayStation 3
- Release: Windows; May 4, 2012; Xbox 360, PlayStation 3: NA: October 2, 2012
- Genre: Business simulation
- Modes: Single-player, multiplayer

Port Royale 3: Pirates & Merchants is the third installment to the business simulation game Port Royale: Gold, Power and Pirates and Port Royale 2. It is set in the Caribbean during the 16th and 17th centuries. Created by Kalypso Media which founded Gaming Minds Studios in 2009 after Ascaron Entertainment went bankrupt, it combines a business simulator with real-time battles and towns that can be owned, built, developed or razed. This is the 1st installment of the Port Royale Series done by Gaming Minds Studios.

The first preview of Port Royale 3 took place during the Gamescom trade fair which was held from 17 to 21 August 2011 in Cologne, Germany.

A sequel, Port Royale 4, was released in 2020.

== Story ==
The protagonist is a young Spanish commoner who left Spain to explore the New World. An accident at sea casts him overboard, and he finds himself in the Caribbean city of Port Royale. His life changes forever when he meets Elena, the beautiful daughter of the Viceroy. He has two options to win her heart: The merchant "Path of the Trader" or the pirate "Path of the Adventurer."

Path of The Trader details the economic part of the game. Elena and her father grew up from the humble town of Cayman. Cayman had been overlooked by the major European powers and traders and struggled economically. The Trader decides to win her heart through developing the small colony into a bustling city, all while dealing with a superficial rival suitor who woos Elena with gaudy gifts instead of helping the town.

Path of the Adventurer details the combat aspect of the game. Elena is captured by pirates hired by a young Frenchman who plans to marry her. The Adventurer ends up at war with the French in order to save Elena.

== Gameplay ==
Port Royale 3 is an open-ended game, so players can choose to pursue several careers. This could range from a business tycoon to a pirate. Initially, you must trade goods between Caribbean colonies to make money, but over the long term you can have substantial business interests in many Caribbean ports, and support large fighting fleets.

Gameplay revolves around playing as a business tycoon, where trade is made with towns to gain their friendship, allowing the player to acquire building permits to establish businesses there. The player can come into possession of their own town, but it can take a very long time. As a buccaneer with a Letter of Marque, the player can attack any of the four colonial nations in the Caribbean circa 1600; from largest to smallest: Spain, England, France, and the Netherlands.

Ships range from a small Pinnace to a massive Ship of the Line. There are also missions you can complete for money, supplies, or improved relations. At higher levels you can also automate the game to some degree, by setting up trade routes that your trading fleets will follow from town to town.

Fickle politics impact the game. Given the rivalry among Spain, England, France, and the Netherlands, the game's system allows players to align themselves with different colonial powers as the geopolitical situation changes.

Famous pirates of the age also make appearances, who likely to attack any ship or town that they please, including those that belong to the player. They usually operate from heavily fortified bases, but if defeated, the player gains favorability with a nation of their choosing.

Initially, you have operating constraints (how many fleets you may have and how many towns you can buy building permits in), but as you gain levels (based on net worth), you can have unlimited fleets and permits.

As opposed to its predecessor, Port Royale 2, where the player controls only one ship against their opponents' fleet, the player now can enter naval combat with 2 additional escort ships from their fleet which are automated. The player can switch control between the ships, allowing for greater flexibility in combat. The option of being rewarded with one's own town within the game by the viceroy of a nation for contributions (taking over of a warring nation's town), has now been replaced by a system allowing the player to take over the towns existing in the world via military or diplomatic means.

== Reception ==
On Metacritic, Port Royale 3 received a rating of 56/100 for Xbox 360, 54/100 for PC, and does not have sufficient reviews for an aggregate rating on PlayStation 3.

Midlife Gamer gave the game 6/10, stating "Action is not the order of the day here. Port Royale 3 is incredibly slow paced especially during the first few hours." and that "The visuals in Port Royale are a mixed bag. The in game cut scenes look really nice; sadly the same cannot be said for the trading over world map. It's nowhere near as pleasing to the eye as other parts of the game so much so to the point that it looks like you are playing a much older game."

GameSpot rated the title 5/10, noting that although it looked good and played smoothly, despite there being plenty to do in the game none of it was much fun.
