= DarkStar One =

2006 video game

- European Windows cover art
- Developer(s): Ascaron (Note: Nintendo Switch version developed by Engine Software)
- Publisher(s): CDV Software, Kalypso Media
- Platform(s): Microsoft Windows; Xbox 360; Nintendo Switch
- Release: Microsoft Windows: EU: June 16, 2006; NA: August 14, 2006; Xbox 360: EU: June 18, 2010; NA: July 20, 2010; AU: August 19, 2010; September 13, 2011 (Games on Demand); Nintendo Switch: WW: June 20, 2024
- Genre(s): Space trading and combat simulator
- Mode(s): Single-player

DarkStar One is a space trading and combat simulator game developed by German studio Ascaron and published by CDV.

The PC version of the game was released on June 16, 2006, in Europe, August 14, 2006, in North America and subsequently digitally via GOG.com on December 17, 2006 (English only), and DotEmu on May 19, 2008 (English, French, German). The Xbox 360 version was released on July 20, 2008, under the title Darkstar One: Broken Alliance by Kalypso Media, featuring 1080p and improved gameplay.

A Nintendo Switch version featuring enhanced visuals was later released under the title DarkStar One – Nintendo Switch Edition. This new version was developed by Engine Software and published by Kalypso Media on June 20, 2024.

== Storyline ==
The DarkStar One is an advanced, partly organic starship that was built by the protagonist's late father, Simon Jarvis, using technologies from an ancient race. Jarvis was the co-founder and co-owner of a security firm, SimRob Industries, and his business partner and friend, Robert Altair, gives Jarvis's son Kayron, the protagonist, the starship after his father's death. After Kayron becomes familiarised with the controls of the DarkStar One, Robert tells him the manner of his father's death. The weapons system on Jarvis's ship had been sabotaged by Jarvis's former co-pilot Jack Forrester. Robert identifies Forrester as a traitor and murderer.

While Kayron sets out to hunt Forrester down in revenge, a series of attacks take place on research stations across the Galactic Union (GU). The attacking ships, identified simply as drones, appear to be a type of vessel completely unknown to the GU, and Robert convinces the Galactic Council that they are of Thul origin, a genetically engineered human civilization. This antagonizes all races within the Galactic Union against the Thul.

In a state of heightened tension, military units are mobilized to the GU's borders in anticipation of galactic war: precisely what the Union was founded to guard against. Unfortunately, this leads to an escalation of unrest already present within GU territory: border disputes between the Arrack and Oc'to, and an increase in piracy and smuggling in the more remote and independent systems.

Soon Kayron meets a pilot called Eona, who – enigmatically – is also looking for Forrester, but she does not divulge why. Eona's mysterious past, of a legally questionable nature, means she has many contacts otherwise unavailable to Kayron, mostly linked to the criminal underworld. She becomes Kayron's co-pilot.

Their adventure together leads them to Eona's sudden kidnapping and her subsequent rescue, the collecting of information from four research stations pertaining to Oc'to scientist Dr. Zarkov's research into the drone attacks, and the eventual discoveries of Forrester and Dr Zarkov. There is also the revelation that it was Robert who was behind Kayron's father's death, for which he framed Forrester, and that the Thul is not responsible for the drone attacks. A highly advanced, extra-galactic race called the S'kaa is behind the attacks, and they are bent on galactic domination. Their primary means of achieving this is to control individuals in power, including Robert, and intimidate them into divulging where the weakest and most easily conquerable planet systems are. They also exploit tensions already present in the galaxy's politics, subtly manipulating races into wars that will weaken all sides.

With help from allies whom they meet during their travels – including the Thul cruiser Eoghane II – Kayron and Eona manage to find and reach the system where the S’kaa mothership is located. Together they formulate a plan of attack: using the DarkStar One’s unique plasma cannon, they create a rupture in the S’kaa ship's (otherwise impenetrable) shields, shortly after Robert – who is held captive inside the mothership for his failure to kill Kayron earlier in the story – double-crosses the S’kaa and sends a message to Kayron detailing the mothership's shields. With the shield penetrated, Kayron manoeuvres the DarkStar One through the ship's maze-like outer hull and into its core. After destroying the shield generator in the core, he flees from the ensuing explosion and flies back out to space.

The S’kaa escape by detaching the top of their mothership from its main body and activating a portal back to their home territory. The rest of the mothership disintegrates. The DarkStar One and its allies destroy the portal beam generators that opened the portal, thereby preventing the S’kaa from returning. Victorious, they all return to the Thul cruiser on which the final battle was planned.

Eona leaves the DarkStar One afterwards, but programs the ship's computer with her voice so that Kayron will "never be alone". The mission log reads, "No more story missions available", but the open-ended activities of trading, escorting merchant ships, carrying out mercenary assignments, and fending off pirate attacks can still be done.

=== Setting ===
The story takes place in the Milky Way, beginning in a solar system called Pencah, several light-years away from the Earth. Starting in Terran (human) territory, the game takes Kayron Jarvis, the protagonist, across the known galaxy, in which he encounters five alien races – the Mortok, Raptor, Oc'to, Arrack, and the Thul – each with their own distinct cultural identities and fighting styles. The Terrans, Mortok, Raptor, Oc’to, and Arrack together form the Galactic Union (GU), a UN-like confederacy which was formed by the Terrans after a major galactic war, in order to prevent such large-scale conflicts from ever happening again. Because of drone attacks, the Thul have become isolated to their territory, while the rest of the galaxy slowly organizes itself against them.

The galaxy is divided into 23 sectors, or ‘clusters’, which contain 331 solar systems. There are seven races in the galaxy; however, only six have territories. These are Terrans, Mortok, Raptor, Oc'to, Arrack, and Thul. The S'kaa is the seventh, and their home territory is unknown, their mothership just occupying an abandoned system in Raptor territory. In Terran territory, the Galactic Union has its Council – its headquarters – on Earth, Sol System, Alpha Centauri cluster.

== Gameplay ==
The game is divided into different action role-playing quests. These are main storyline quests, side quests, and missions which can be accepted from trade stations. The latter can further be broken down into missions which include freighter escort, transportation, bounty hunting, espionage, or taking photos of objects that are of interest to your contractors. In addition, the player is also able to trade, mine, or liberate star systems from space pirates.

=== The DarkStar One ===
DarkStar One has some action role-playing elements in it, which are reflected by the ship's properties.

The ship, DarkStar One, is a long-range fighter that is partly organic in its construction, and is upgraded by absorbing alien artifacts that are scattered across the galaxy, usually found inside large asteroids. The artifacts will allow the ship to be enhanced, enabling greater firepower, compatibility with a variety of alien weaponry, manoeuvrability, and resistance to attack. Artifacts add to the exterior of the ship, changing its physical appearance over the course of the game, and increasing the number of weapons and equipment it can carry.

The ship consists of four upgradeable parts: the hull, wings, engines, and plasma cannon. Every time sufficient artifacts are recovered, the player is given the opportunity to upgrade one of the first three along with upgrading the plasma cannon as well.

The plasma cannon is a unique weapon within the DarkStar One universe, and can be used to provide a number of additional attacks and abilities designed to give the player the edge in combat. These can be offensive or defensive, aiding either the ship's weapons, shields, or attacking enemy ships directly. Once all 100 artifacts have been recovered, the plasma cannon also unlocks a zero-point drive, allowing unlimited hyperspace travel throughout the galaxy.

== Critical reception ==
DarkStar One

Aggregate scores
Aggregator	Score
GameRankings	72.87%
Metacritic	71/100

Review scores
Publication	Score
1Up.com	B−
Eurogamer	8/10
G4	3/5
GameSpot	8.1/10
IGN	8/10
PC Zone	66/100
PC Format	60%

DarkStar One received positive to mixed reviews, scoring 71/100 on Metacritic based on 33 reviews. The graphics were often praised, but the gameplay was not. GameSpot lauded its accessibility and simplicity, while ActionTrip derided it as overly simplistic and repetitive. The game was frequently compared to other space sims, including Elite, Freelancer, and the X series.
