= Siege of Annapolis Royal =

Siege of Annapolis Royal may refer to:

- Siege of Annapolis Royal (1711)
- Siege of Annapolis Royal (1744)
- Siege of Annapolis Royal (1745)
