= On the Ball (video game series) =

1990s video game series

- Developer: Ascaron
- Publisher: Ascaron
- Designer: Gerald Köhler
- Platforms: Amiga, MS-DOS
- Release: 1993
- Genre: Business simulation
- Mode: Single-player

On the Ball (German: Anstoss – Der Fußballmanager (lit. Kick-Off - Football Manager)) is a football management game series from the German developers Ascaron, former name Ascon. The premiere title in the series is On the Ball. The player is managing a football club in the English League (in the original version the Bundesliga to become the Bundestrainer). The original game was popular in Germany, and Ascaron created several sequels: "On the Ball 2", "On the Ball 3", and "On the Ball Action". Doppelpass was a bundle that included On the Ball and the self-running add-on Anstoss World Cup Edition. The English version has a minor fan base.

== Gameplay ==
The player chooses a team in the main menu which has the look of an office. As a manager, the player not only elects the football players for the team, but also run a stadium with the price management and the transfer of players. The football games can be presented in different forms. There is a text mode where the games are presented and commentated in text form and the last one has the text and some pictures of a game. The tactic of the own team could be changed and players could be switched. The career is limited to ten seasons.

== Reception ==
=== On the Ball / Anstoss ===
In Europe alone, Anstoss achieved lifetime sales of 260,000 units by 2004, a figure that Stern's Volker Gast called "respectable".

=== On the Ball 2 / Anstoss 2 ===
On Media Control's computer game sales charts for the German market, Anstoss 2 claimed positions 4 and 7 in the first and second halves of October 1997. Dropping to eighth and 11th in November, it finished in 17th place for the final four weeks of the year. Anstoss 2 remained in 11th place on the Media Control charts by May 1998's latter half, by which time it had spent 38 consecutive weeks in the firm's top rankings. In November 1998, the Verband der Unterhaltungssoftware Deutschland (VUD) presented the game with a "Gold" award, indicating sales of at least 100,000 units across Germany, Austria and Switzerland. The game's Anstoss 2 Gold edition held in Media Control's charts through late 1998, and retained places 16th and 19th for January 1999. Its streak in the top rankings had run 16 weeks at the time.

=== On the Ball 3 / Anstoss 3 ===
Anstoss 3 was commercially successful. It became a hit at launch in the German market, where retailer PC Fun reported "sensational sales in the first two days". The title debuted at #1 on Media Control's computer game sales rankings for February 2000, and claimed second the following month. In April, the VUD awarded Anstoss 3 "Gold" status for German-region sales of at least 100,000 units through the end of March. Claiming places fifth and eighth in April and May, respectively, the game soon reached sales of 140,000 units in the German market. PC Player's Udo Hoffman wrote that this was a new record for both Ascaron and publisher Infogrames. Anstoss 3 remained in Media Control's top 20 by September, with an unbroken seven-month streak in the top 30. According to Tobias Simon of Gameswelt, the game totaled roughly 300,000 sales by late 2002: around 200,000 copies sold at full price, and 100,000 copies at budget prices.
