= USS Port Royal =

USS Port Royal may refer to:

- USS Port Royal (1862) was a sidewheel steamer gunboat commissioned in 1862, active in the Civil War, and decommissioned 1866
- The Ticonderoga-class cruiser, hull number CG-69, which was originally named Port Royal, but changed to Vicksburg. Commissioned in 1992
- USS Port Royal (CG-73) was a Ticonderoga-class guided missile cruiser, commissioned in 1994, decommissioned in 2022
