= Lunistice (video game) =

2022 video game

- Developer: A Grumpy Fox
- Publisher: Deck13
- Engine: Unity
- Platforms: Microsoft Windows; Nintendo Switch
- Release: November 10, 2022
- Genre: Platform
- Mode: Single-player

Lunistice is a 3D platforming video game developed by German developer A Grumpy Fox and published by Deck13 in 2022.

== Gameplay ==
Gameplay follows the format of a 3D platformer. The player controls Hana, an anthropomorphic tanuki, and must guide her to the goal at the end of each stage while avoiding enemies and obstacles. Hana can run, jump, double jump, and perform a spinning attack to destroy enemies and extend their jumps. The game tracks number of falls, number of items collected, and time taken to score the player. Level design is based on linear progression, with branching paths containing secret items.

== Development ==
Lunistice was made by a developer in Germany called A Grumpy Fox, and was initially titled Eversleep. The game was initially intended to be developed in 30 days, though development took over a year. The first iteration of the game was a 2D platformer, with an intermediate version being a 3D rail shooter. Speedrunners were considered during development. Graphics were inspired by games found on the Sega Saturn and the PlayStation.

Following delays in launching, Deck13 published Lunistice on November 10, 2022.

== Reception ==
Reception

Aggregate score
Aggregator	Score
Metacritic	NS: 79/100

Review scores
Publication	Score
Nintendo Life	NS: 9/10
TouchArcade	NS: 4/5

Metacritic indicated the Nintendo Switch version received "generally favorable reviews".

Nintendo Life praised the game for its combination of retro inspired aesthetics and level design with contemporary controls, camera, and overall polish. Touch Arcade expressed similar positive sentiment regarding the gameplay, though it noted that some levels could feel too lengthy, and that the overall game was not long.
