= Forge of Empires =

2012 video game

- Developer: InnoGames
- Publisher: InnoGames
- Platforms: Web browser, iOS, Android
- Release: 17 April 2012
- Genres: Strategy, citybuilding

Forge of Empires is a browser-based strategy game developed by InnoGames. It was first launched on closed beta on 29 March 2012. The game was initially released on 17 April 2012 (open beta phase). In 2013, a television advertising campaign helped the game reach 10 million user registrations. The game was later released on iOS 2014, and Android in 2015. The game is similar to both SimCity and Clash of Clans, but includes turn-based strategy elements. As of 2023, the game earned over $1 billion in lifetime revenue. More than 50% of players play the game on mobile devices. As of 2023, the game has over 130 million registered players.

== Gameplay ==
A screenshot of Forge of Empires gameplay, showing the city management menu

Forge of Empires is a city-builder that starts in the Stone Age and, with a technology tree, advances through all eras of human history to the far future. Houses provide population, which is required to build other buildings, and gold. Production buildings provide supplies. Goods can be produced by dedicated buildings. Decorations and cultural buildings provide an amount of happiness, that should meet the requirement of the existing population. Forge points are used to advance through the technology tree, and recharge over time. Each new era provides new buildings of each type, and sometimes new gameplay mechanics.

There are Great Buildings, based on famous historical structures, that provide greater benefits. However, their construction and upgrading requires space, goods, forge points, and a special resource, blueprints.

Combat requires the construction of military units, and take place in a minigame of turn-based tactics. The minigame takes place in a hexagon pattern, and units have strengths and weaknesses against others and certain terrain in a rock paper scissors style. Combat takes place against the game in a world map, and in several types of player-versus-player formats. Players may group in teams named guilds.

== Languages ==
Initially, Forge of Empires was only available in English and German. As of 2023, there were 25 language versions available. A Korean language server was closed in 2016.

== Awards ==
- 2013 – MMO Award for Best Strategy Browser MMO
- 2013 – Deutscher Computerspielpreis for Best Browser Game
