= Tribal Wars =

2003 video game

- Developer: InnoGames
- Publisher: InnoGames
- Platform: Browser
- Release: 2003
- Genres: Real-time strategy, Massively multiplayer online game

Tribal Wars (TW) is a browser-based, real-time strategy, massively multiplayer online game set in the Middle Ages. The game is set with each player starting off controlling a small village, with the objective being to slowly expand and conquer new villages through the formation of complex armies and a tactical combat system. The game incorporates multiple components of teamwork, planning, and strategy. The game allows players to collect resources, build armies, construct buildings, combat other armies (players or neutral), and conquer new villages. The game also allows for a level of player-specific customization, in regards to village names, army types, and troop-counts. The game operates under world-specific settings that vary from world to world.

== History ==
Tribal Wars, or Die Stämme as it is known in German, is a browser-based game and was released in 2003 as a text-based game. It was developed and released by the German company InnoGames. The game was originally developed by brothers, Eike Klindworth and Hendrik Klindworth, and their friend, Michael Zillmer, before it expanded steadily over the years. The international version of the game was released in 2006. The game is one of the most popular browser based games in the world, ranking among the top ten in number of players. There are over 59 million registered users. It has been reviewed by Gamestar and Forbes.

In late 2012, Tribal Wars' mobile version became free for use by all players with improved features, including touch screen and graphical upgrades, which developer InnoGames attributed to a shift to "a higher mobile focus in general."

== Game mechanics ==
Each player controls their game from their village. From the main screen, the player can "visit" buildings such as the village headquarters to construct buildings, the barracks, stable, or workshop to recruit units, and the rally point to take command of units. Each screen can be accessed by clicking on a link, and the vast majority of the game is played through a text based interface. Some players choose to place information such as in-game personal allies, ASCII art, or quotes.

=== Tribes ===
A large portion of the game revolves around the use of tribes, or semi-official groups of players. These players join together for mutual protection and guidance. The size of different tribes varies from world to world, depending on decisions of the tribal aristocracy (leadership council) and built-in limits on tribe size. Some worlds do not allow tribes of more than twenty-five members, while others have no limit on members. Tribes have the ability to set diplomacy with other tribes and create their own private tribal forum. Tribal diplomacy is non-binding, but any breach of diplomacy is generally frowned upon by other players. The victory of the world usually depends on a tribe-based objective that has to be met.

Most tribes are created after the world in question has begun. However, groups of players will occasionally get together before a world starts to coordinate the set-up of a tribe. These "premade" tribes generally have more experienced players, but are not notably more successful than other tribes.

Each tribe can assign a special set of privileges and titles specific to particular tribe members. Some of these titles involve Duke/Tribe Founder, Baron, Recruiter, Diplomat, Forum Moderator, and Council. Titles and privileges are usually given to players of leadership and experience. Furthermore, the majority of these players utilize a non-in-game mode of communication to ensure "effective," and "covert," conversation.

=== Combat ===
Combat in the game is heavily based on statistical attributes of troops, real-time waiting and attacking villages. A player can send their troops to another player's village either to reinforce or attack it. In the case of attacking, casualties are determined based on the number and type of troops sent, and factors such as morale and luck. Attacking troops who survived will then return to their original city with the plundered resources, should they be present in the city at the time of the attack. In order for a player to conquer other villages, a unit called a nobleman must be sent to attack a village and survive. After a successful attack the nobleman decreases the village loyalty anywhere from 20 to 35 points (out of 100). When the village loyalty falls to zero or below, the attacker takes full control of the village. Troops can be recruited for use in combat at the barracks, stable, and workshop, while noblemen can be created at the academy and a paladin can be created at the statue.

=== Paladin weapons ===
In some worlds there are weapons that the paladin can equip. These weapons usually enhance certain troops abilities, most commonly attack or defense statistics depending on the weapon. For example, the "Bonfire" looks like a flaming torch and greatly increases the offense and defense values of Catapults. The "Vasco's Scepter" adjusts the nobleman's ability to lower village loyalty to a minimum of 30.

=== Real-time interaction ===
All actions in the game take a pre-set amount of time. The time it takes a player's army to reach another village depends on the distance, as well as the predetermined "speed" of the attacking units. All units have their own speed and the entire army moves at the speed of its slowest component. Each building level has a longer base time for completion, though the amount of time a building upgrade actually takes for completion is dependent upon the level of the "Village Headquarters" A higher HQ level provides faster building upgrades. Higher levels troop production buildings, such as barracks, stable, and workshop facilitate faster recruitment speeds. It is not unusual for some actions to take hours, perhaps even days, to complete.

Because the game takes place in real time many of the game's tactics are based on precision timing execution. For example, a common tactic to conquer an opponent's village is known as a "noble train" whereby an attacker sends multiple attacks in rapid succession with the first attack containing a full attack force (clearing out any defenses that may be in the village), while the subsequent attacks contain only one nobleman and a light escort, which will be able to land successfully after defenses have been eliminated. This method is necessary due to the fact that conquering a village requires lowering its loyalty from 100 percent to zero and each successful attacking nobleman lowers a village's loyalty by a randomly generated amount between 20 and 35 percent, while only one nobleman can be effective in a single attack command. While player skill, as well as the world's "attack gap" settings, influence the quality of a noble train, it is common for four man noble trains to have as little as 300 milliseconds difference from first attack landing to final attack landing. Consequently, a common defense that has been developed is known as "sniping" where a player will attempt to have defensive troops absent for the initial clearing attack, but arrive at the village in the milliseconds gap before the final noble lands, thus allowing a successful defense with minimal loss of defensive troops. A snipe may be accompanied by a precision counterattack known as "backtiming." By knowing the speed of the attacking army, and knowing the distance between the player's village and his opponent's village, a skilled player can time a counterattack to land at his target just milliseconds after the attacking army returns to its origin, and subsequently kill the opponent's entire attack force, thus eliminating the threat. The quality of a backtime attack is based on how precisely it lags behind the original attack force, as skilled players may be able to dodge a backtime in less than one second by resending his army out to another village.

In order to execute these techniques effectively will often require a player to become knowledgeable of the features of various web browsers, including the use of shortcuts and tabs, which allow a player to set up a tactic, and quickly switch to new tabs to click appropriate buttons to initiate the actions. There are also an assortment of tools that have been developed to assist players in making the necessary time calculations. Many guides and tutorials have been developed by the player community to assist novice players in developing their tactical skills.

=== Worlds ===
There are multiple "worlds" that can be played on, and each world has a unique set of rules to it, two of which are 'world speed' and 'troop speed', which commonly vary somewhere between 0.5 and 2, though some "speed rounds" have world speeds reaching into the hundreds. The world speed regulates how fast every action in the game occurs, while troop speed adjusts the speed of the moving units with respect to world speed.

Furthermore, each world has varied settings upon technology, troops, weapons loot, and tribe limit. Each world adjust the types of troops available to the player, usually varying archers and paladin. The world can also adjust the availability of paladin weapons.

Lastly, each world has its own specified victory qualifications, which a tribe has to meet before being declared the victorious tribe of the world.

=== Awards system ===
Tribal Wars utilizes an Award system reminiscent of Achievements/Trophies etc., where players gain "plaques" that they can show off on their profile for milestones. Awards add incentive for players to contribute to offensive operations both internally in their tribe and externally, support friends, and plunder and conquer other villages. Some Awards are satirical such as "Unlucky Fellow," achieved by failing to conquer a village by 1 loyalty point.

There are also five daily Awards: Looter (for farming the most resources), Plunderer (for looting the most villages), Attacker (for destroying the most enemy units as attacker), Defender (for destroying the most enemy units as defender), and Great Power (for conquering the most villages).

Awards have 4 levels - Wood, Bronze, Silver and Gold. Wooden framed Awards are the most basic, consequentially Gold are the best and hardest to achieve. This system shows clearly how well a player has performed in certain aspects of the game.

Awards are not shared between different worlds. Awards on one world are independent there, though they can be displayed on a player's profile on a different world to demonstrate the players previous experience as well as accomplishments.

With the addition of flags to the game dynamic, earning awards of any type results in the reception of a flag of a certain level, correlating directly with the difficulty of the flag.

With the Version 7.0 update, multiple new Awards were introduced, such as The Warlord (for attacking numerous players) and Brothers in Arms (for being a member of a tribe for a period of time).

As of version 8.5, three new achievements were added: Master of Quests (measuring completed quests), Architect Drive (measuring number of construction assignments completed across all villages), and Recruitment Drive (measuring a total count of troops recruited across all villages). A fourth achievement, Out of Time, was announced to be released at a later time.

=== Victory ===
Originally, the goal of Tribal Wars was to have a single tribe/player conquer all villages in the world. However, the process of conquering a world could take several years. Recent worlds have alternate ways to achieve victory in an attempt to streamline world completion. such as holding specific villages for a set amount of time, or conquering a certain percentage of the world, while other worlds end after polling the remaining players. Therefore, unique world victory settings have been introduced.

This "dominance" scenario of the endgame involves a tribe or a player to meet the criteria of minimum points/villages for a period of time. The world players are notified when the criteria are met and are provided a certain period of time prior to the world officially being declared "at end".

Most recently the Secrets of Power where many different technologies are assigned to barbarian or bonus villages which need to be taken control of via ennoblement and then kept under a tribes control until one of each Secret is controlled, at which time an end-game counter will start. If the tribe holds on to the Secrets until the counter reaches zero, the world will enter peace settings and the world will eventually be closed. However, you can also achieve victory by defeating all your opponents.

== Sequel ==
On November 20, 2013, InnoGames announced the release of the sequel to their original game after 10 years. The sequel was meant to incorporate its original components of strategy and teamwork, but also incorporates new elements of new artwork, updated game-play style, and modern technology.

On September 2, 2014 the open beta for Tribal Wars 2 was released. It maintained all its original buildings, along with three new ones: Hospital, Tavern, and Hall of Orders. From the Tavern the player can spy on other villages and also counter such spying from others.
