= Ascaron =

German video game developer

Ascaron Entertainment
- Industry: Video games
- Founded: 1991
- Defunct: 2009
- Products: The Patrician series Port Royale series Sacred series

Ascaron Entertainment was a video game developer based in Germany. Founded as Ascon by Holger Flöttmann in 1991 and later renamed in October 1996 due to the possible confusion with the Swiss company Ascom AG, the company produced titles primarily for the PC until it became insolvent in 2009.

== Background and history ==
Ascaron had its headquarters in Gütersloh, a town in western Germany. It had a development studio in Aachen and an international office in Birmingham in the United Kingdom.

Ascaron had a particular focus on strategy and management games. Among its early successes were the Patrician series (a trading simulation) and the On the Ball series (a soccer team management simulation). More recently, the company had developed games such as Port Royale (a pirate/trading simulation game), Sacred (an RPG) and Darkstar One (a space combat simulation).

Ascaron was also known for publishing or distributing many games from smaller developers and publishers. Examples of games distributed by Ascaron in the UK include King's Bounty: The Legend, Audiosurf and several games in the TrackMania-series. The company distributed games from other European publishers, such as Nobilis (entreprise) and Focus Home Interactive.

In April 2009, the company was unable to pay its debts and went into administration, citing the extended development time of Sacred 2: Fallen Angel as the reason. The company continued trading in the hope that a solution could be found but was ultimately dissolved in July 2009, with Kalypso Media purchasing many of the licenses and assets from Ascaron Entertainment, with the notable exception of the licence for Sacred, which was acquired by Deep Silver (Germany). Gaming Minds Studios was then launched by Kalypso and former Ascaron employees. 15 former Ascaron developers joined the Gaming Minds Studios.

As of April 2010, Ascaron UK was still in operation, acting as a distributor for other publishers. Customers include Paradox Interactive.

== Games ==
- The Patrician (1992)
- On the Ball (original title: Anstoss) (1993)
- Hanse - Die Expedition (1994)
- Elisabeth I (1995)
- Pole Position (1996)
- On the Ball 2 (1997)
- Extreme 500 (1998)
- On the Ball 3 (2000)
- Patrician II (2000)
- On the Ball Action (2001)
- Ballerburg (2001)
- Big Scale Racing (2002)
- Patrician III: Rise of the Hanse (2002)
- Port Royale: Gold, Power and Pirates (2002)
- Hyper Rails (2003)
- Sacred (2004)
- Arena Wars (2004)
- Port Royale 2 (2004)
- Tortuga: Pirates of the New World (US title: Pirate Hunter) (2004)
- The Great Art Race (original title: Vermeer 2) (2004)
- Sacred Underworld (2005)
- DarkStar One (2006)
- Tortuga: Two Treasures (2007)
- Sacred 2: Fallen Angel (2008)
- World War One (2008)

== See also ==
- Gaming Minds Studios
