= List of business simulation video games =

See Lists of video games for related lists.

This is a comprehensive index of business simulation games, sorted chronologically. Information regarding date of release, developer, platform, setting and notability is provided when available. The table can be sorted by clicking on the small boxes next to the column headings.

== Legend ==
Video game platforms
3DO	3DO	3DS	Nintendo 3DS, 3DS Virtual Console, iQue 3DS	AMI	Amiga
APPII	Apple II	ATR	Atari 8-bit computers	ATRST	Atari ST, Atari Falcon
BBC	BBC Micro, Acorn Electron, BBC Master	C64	Commodore 64	CPC	Amstrad CPC
DC	Dreamcast	DOS	PC DOS / MS-DOS, Windows 3.X	DS	Nintendo DS, DSiWare, iQue DS
GB	Game Boy	GBA	Game Boy Advance, iQue GBA	GBC	Game Boy Color
GCN	GameCube	GEN	Genesis / Mega Drive	iOS	iOS, iPhone, iPod, iPadOS, iPad, visionOS, Apple Vision Pro
iPhone	Term not found	iPod	Term not found	JAG	Atari Jaguar
LIN	Linux, SteamOS	MAC	Classic Mac OS, 2001 and before	MAIN	Mainframe computer
MOBI	Mobile phone	MSX	MSX	N64	Nintendo 64, iQue Player
NES	Nintendo Entertainment System / Famicom	NX	(replace with NS)	OSX	macOS
PALM	Palm OS	PC88	PC-8800 series	PCJR	IBM PCjr
PPC	Pocket PC	PS1	PlayStation 1	PS2	PlayStation 2
PS3	PlayStation 3	PS4	PlayStation 4	PS5	PlayStation 5
PSN	PlayStation Network	PSP	PlayStation Portable	PSV	PlayStation Vita
SAT	Sega Saturn	SCD	Sega CD / Mega-CD	SNES	Super NES / Super Famicom / Super Comboy
Steam	Steam	VC	Term not found	WEB	Browser game
Wii	Wii, WiiWare, Wii Virtual Console	WiiU	Wii U, WiiU Virtual Console	WIN	Windows, all versions Windows 95 and up
WIN3X	Term not found	WIN9X	Term not found	X360	(replace with XB360)
XBLA	Term not found	XBOX	(replace with XB)	XOne	(replace with XBO)
XSX/S	(replace with XBX/S)	ZETA	ZETA (operating system)	ZX	ZX Spectrum

Types of releases
Compilation	A compilation, anthology or collection of several titles, usually (but not always) belonging to the same series
Early access	A game launched in early access is unfinished and thus might contain bugs and glitches or have some of the content missing
Episodic	An episodic video game that is released in batches over a period of time
Expansion	A large-scale DLC to an already existing game that adds new story, areas and additions and/or changes to the game's mechanics
Full release	A full release of a game that launched in early access first
Limited	A special release (often called "Limited" or "Collector's Edition") with bonus collector's material. Often provided to people who pre-order a game
Port	The game first appeared on a different platform and a port was made. The game is like the original, with few or no differences
Remake	The game is an enhanced remake of an original, made using a new engine and/or assets and thus containing completely new sound, graphics and possibly changes to the story and/or gameplay
Remaster	The game is a remaster of an original, released on the same or different platform, with (usually minor) changes to graphics, sound and/or gameplay
Rerelease	The game was re-released on the same platform with no or only minor changes

== List ==
Year	Game	Developer	Setting	Platform	Notes
1963	Intopia		Modern		
1964	The Sumerian Game	Mabel Addis	Historical	MAIN	Text-based economic simulation game based on the ancient Sumerian city-state of Lagash.
1973	Lemonade Stand	MECC	Modern	MAIN, APPII	Created in 1973, ported to Apple II in 1979
1979	Taipan!	Mega Micro Computers	Historical	TRS80, APPII	Created in 1979, ported to Apple II in 1982
1980	Windfall: The Oil Crisis Game	David Mullich	Modern	APPII	
1981	Cartels & Cutthroats	Strategic Simulations	Modern	APPII, DOS, C64	
1982	Millionaire: The Stock Market Simulation	Blue Chip Software	Modern	APPII, ATR, C64, DOS, MAC	Won the 1985 Arkie Award for "Best Electronic Money Game".
1983	Baron: The Real Estate Simulation	Blue Chip Software	Modern	Apple II, Atari 8-bit, Commodore 64, MS-DOS, Mac	
1983	Business Games	Acornsoft	Modern	BBC	Contains Stokmark and Telemark.
1983	M.U.L.E.	Ozark	Sci-fi	ATR, C64, MSX, NES, PC88, PCJR	
1983	Oil Barons	Epyx	Modern	APPII, C64, DOS	
1984	Drug Wars	John E. Dell	Modern	DOS	
1984	Kaiser	Ariolasoft	Historical	ATR, C64, CPC, AMI	
1984	Millionaire	Incentive Software	Modern	ZX, BBC	
1984	Mugsy	Melbourne House	Historical	ZX	
1984	The Biz	Virgin Games	Modern	ZX	
1984	Make Millions	Tom Snyder Productions Inc.	Modern	MAC	
1984	Run for the Money	Tom Snyder Productions Inc.	Sci-fi	APPII, ATR, C64, DOS, MAC	
1985	American Dream: The Business Management Simulation	Blue Chip Software	Modern	DOS	Also known as Managing for Success
1985	Project Space Station	Human Engineered Software	Modern	APPII, C64, DOS	
1986	Mugsy's Revenge	Beam	Historical	C64, ZX	Sequel to Mugsy.
1986	Ports of Call	Aegis	Historical	AMI, DOS	
1987	Earth Orbit Stations	Karl Buiter	Sci-fi	APPII, C64	
1989	Black Gold (a.k.a. Oil Imperium)	reLINE	Historical	AMI, C64, DOS, ATRST	
1990	Sid Meier's Railroad Tycoon	MicroProse	Historical	AMI, DOS, MAC, ATRST	First title in the series.
1991	Mad TV	Rainbow	Modern	AMI, DOS	First title in the series.
1992	A-Train	Artdink	Modern	AMI, DOS, MAC, PS1	
1992	Aerobiz	Koei	Modern	GEN, SNES	
1992	Patrician, The	Ascaron	Historical	AMI, DOS, ATRST	First title in the series.
1993	Aerobiz Supersonic	Koei	Modern	GEN, SNES	Sequel to Aerobiz.
1993	Buzz Aldrin's Race into Space	Strategic	Historical	DOS	
1993	Detroit	Impressions	Historical	AMI, DOS	
1993	DinoPark Tycoon	MECC, Manley & Associates	Sci-fi	3DO, DOS, MAC, WIN	
1993	Merchant Prince	Holistic	Historical	DOS	
1993	Sid Meier's Railroad Tycoon Deluxe	MicroProse	Historical	DOS	Re-release of Sid Meier's Railroad Tycoon.
1993	SimFarm	Maxis	Modern	DOS, MAC, WIN3X	
1994	Gazillionaire	LavaMind	Modern	WIN	
1994	Airlines	Interactivision	Modern	DOS	
1994	Pizza Tycoon (a.k.a. Pizza Connection)	Software 2000	Modern	AMI, DOS, WIN	First title in the series.
1994	SimHealth	Thinking Tools	Modern	DOS	
1994	SimTower	OPeNBooK	Modern	MAC, WIN3X, WIN9X	
1994	Theme Park	Bullfrog	Modern	3DO, AMI, DOS, DS, GEN, MAC, JAG, PS1, SAT, SCD, SNES	
1994	Transport Tycoon	Chris Sawyer	Modern	DOS, PS1	
1995	Capitalism	Enlight	Modern	DOS, MAC	
1995	Machiavelli the Prince	Holistic	Historical	DOS	
1995	Transport Tycoon Deluxe	Chris Sawyer	Modern	DOS, WIN9X, PS1	Remake of Transport Tycoon.
1995	SimIsle: Missions in the Rainforest	Maxis	Modern	DOS, WIN3X, MAC	
1996	Zapitalism	LavaMind	Fantasy	WIN	
1996	Capitalism Plus	Enlight	Modern	WIN	Remake of Capitalism.
1996	Harvest Moon	Pack-In-Video	Fantasy	GBC, SNES, VC	First title in the series.
1996	Holiday Island	Sunflowers	Modern	DOS, WIN	
1997	Entrepreneur	Stardock	Modern	WIN	First title in the series.
1997	Harvest Moon GB	Victor	Fantasy	GB, GBC	
1997	Hollywood Mogul	Hollywood Mogul Co.	Modern	WIN	
1997	Industry Giant	JoWood	Modern	WIN	First title in the series.
1997	Legal Crime	Byte Enchanters	Historical	WIN	
1997	Industry Giant: Expansion Set, The	JoWood	Modern	WIN	Expansion to Industry Giant.
1997	Theme Hospital	Bullfrog	Modern	DOS, PS1, PSN, WIN	
1998	Airline Tycoon	Spellbound Entertainment	Modern	LIN, OSX, WIN, ZETA	
1998	Anno 1602: Creation of a New World	Max	Historical	WIN9X	First title in the series. Hybrid with RTS elements.
1998	Constructor	Acclaim	Historical	DOS, WIN, PS1, PS3, PS4, XBOX	
1998	Gangsters: Organized Crime	Hothouse	Historical	WIN	
1998	Lula: The Sexy Empire	CDV	Modern	WIN	
1998	Railroad Tycoon II	PopTop	Historical	DC, LIN, MAC, PS1, WIN	Sequel to Sid Meier's Railroad Tycoon.
1998	Yoot Tower	OpeNBooK9003	Modern	MAC, WIN9X	Unofficial sequel to SimTower.
1999	Harvest Moon 2	Pack-In-Video	Fantasy	GBC	Sequel to Harvest Moon.
1999	Harvest Moon 64	Toy Box, Victor	Fantasy	N64	
1999	Harvest Moon: Back to Nature	Victor, Marvelous	Fantasy	PS1, PSP	
1999	RollerCoaster Tycoon	Chris Sawyer	Modern	WIN, XBOX	First title in the series.
1999	RollerCoaster Tycoon: Corkscrew Follies	Chris Sawyer	Modern	WIN	Expansion to RollerCoaster Tycoon.
1999	Simutrans	Hansjörg Malthaner	Modern		Open source Transport Tycoon Deluxe clone. A development version is available for download.
1999	Theme Park World (a.k.a Theme Park 2, Sim Theme Park)	Bullfrog	Modern	WIN, PS1, PS2, OSX	Sequel to Theme Park.
1999	Wet Attack: The Empire Cums Back	Interactive Strip	Modern	WIN	Sequel to Lula: The Sexy Empire.
1999	X: Beyond the Frontier	Egosoft	Sci-fi	WIN	First title in the series.
2000	Airport Tycoon	Krisalis	Modern	WIN	
2000	Fast Food Tycoon (a.k.a. Pizza Syndicate)	Software 2000	Modern	WIN	Sequel to Pizza Tycoon.
2000	Harvest Moon 3	Victor, Natsume Inc.	Fantasy	GBC	Sequel to Harvest Moon 2.
2000	Harvest Moon for Girls	Victor, Natsume Inc.	Fantasy	PS1	
2000	Patrician II: Quest for Power	Ascaron	Historical	WIN	Sequel to The Patrician.
2000	RollerCoaster Tycoon: Loopy Landscapes	Chris Sawyer	Modern	WIN	Expansion to RollerCoaster Tycoon.
2000	Start-Up 2000	Monte Cristo	Modern	WIN	
2000	Traffic Giant	JoWood	Modern	WIN	
2000	X-Tension	Egosoft	Sci-fi	WIN	Expansion to X: Beyond the Frontier.
2001	Casino Tycoon	Cat Daddy	Modern	WIN	
2001	Fast Food Tycoon 2 (a.k.a. Pizza Connection 2)	Software 2000	Modern	WIN	Sequel to Fast Food Tycoon.
2001	Gangsters 2: Vendetta	Hothouse	Historical	WIN	Sequel to Gangsters: Organized Crime.
2001	Golf Resort Tycoon	Cat Daddy	Modern	WIN	
2001	Harvest Moon: Save the Homeland	Victor	Fantasy	PS2	
2001	Heist	Virgin	Modern	WIN	
2001	Merchant Prince II	Holistic	Historical	WIN	Sequel to Merchant Prince.
2001	Monopoly Tycoon	Deep Red	Modern	WIN	
2001	Moon Tycoon	Legacy	Sci-fi	WIN	
2001	Skateboard Park Tycoon	Cat Daddy	Modern	WIN	
2001	Ski Resort Tycoon	Cat Daddy	Modern	WIN	
2001	StarTopia	Mucky Foot	Sci-fi	WIN	
2001	Corporate Machine, The	Stardock	Modern	WIN	Sequel to Business Tycoon.
2001	Theme Park Inc. (a.k.a SimCoaster, Theme Park Manager)	Bullfrog, Climax Group	Modern	WIN	Sequel to Theme Park World.
2001	Trevor Chan's Capitalism II	Enlight	Modern	WIN	Sequel to Capitalism.
2001	Tropico	PopTop	Modern	MAC, OSX, WIN, WIN9X	Play as a dictator running a small tropical island nation.
2001	Zoo Tycoon	Blue Fang	Modern	DS, MAC, WIN	Build and manage a zoo. First title in the series.
2002	Beach Life	Deep Red	Modern	WIN	
2002	Big Biz Tycoon	Animedia	Modern	WIN	First title in the series.
2002	Casino Mogul	Monte Cristo	Modern	WIN	
2002	Casino Empire	Sierra	Modern	WIN	
2002	Dino Island	Monte Cristo	Sci-fi	WIN	
2002	Dino Island (a.k.a. Dyno Tycoon)	Monte Cristo	Sci-fi	WIN	
2002	Donald Trump's Real Estate Tycoon!	Red Cap	Modern	WIN	
2002	Europa 1400: The Guild	4HEAD	Historical	WIN	Sequel to Die Fugger II.
2002	Golf Resort Tycoon II	Cat Daddy	Modern	WIN	Sequel to Golf Resort Tycoon.
2002	Industry Giant II	JoWood	Modern	WIN	Sequel to Industry Giant.
2002	Lemonade Tycoon	Hexacto, Jamdat	Modern	PALM, PPC, MOBI, WIN	
2002	Mall Tycoon	Holistic	Modern	WIN	First title in the series.
2002	Maximum Capacity: Hotel Giant	Enlight	Modern	WIN	
2002	Miniconomy	Trade Games	Modern	WEB	
2002	Rock Manager	PAN	Modern	WIN	
2002	RollerCoaster Tycoon 2	Chris Sawyer	Modern	WIN	Sequel to RollerCoaster Tycoon.
2002	Shopping Centre Tycoon	Holistic	Modern	WIN	
2002	Trailer Park Tycoon	Jaleco	Modern	WIN	
2002	Tropico: Paradise Island	BreakAway	Modern	WIN, WIN9X	Expansion to Tropico.
2002	Zoo Tycoon: Dinosaur Digs	Blue Fang	Modern	WIN	Expansion to Zoo Tycoon.
2002	Zoo Tycoon: Marine Mania	Blue Fang	Modern	WIN	Expansion to Zoo Tycoon.
2002	Sea Trader: Rise of Taipan	Jaleco Entertainment	Historical	GBA	
2003	Airport Tycoon 2	Sunstorm	Modern	WIN	Sequel to Airport Tycoon.
2003	Airport Tycoon 3	InterActive	Modern	WIN	Sequel to Airport Tycoon 2.
2003	Anno 1503: The New World	Max	Historical	WIN9X, WIN	Sequel to Anno 1602: Creation of a New World. Hybrid with RTS elements.
2003	Anno 1503: Treasures, Monsters and Pirates	Max	Historical	WIN	Expansion to Anno 1503: The New World.
2003	Atlantis Underwater Tycoon	Activision	Modern	WIN	
2003	Big Biz Tycoon 2	2head	Modern	WIN	Sequel to Big Biz Tycoon.
2003	Car Tycoon	Vectorcom	Modern	WIN	
2003	Casino, Inc: The Management	Hothouse	Modern	WIN	Expansion to Casino, Inc..
2003	Casino, Inc.	Hothouse	Modern	WIN	
2003	Deep Sea Tycoon	Anarchy	Modern	WIN	
2003	Eve Online	CCP	Sci-Fi	LIN, OSX, WIN	Space sim. MMORPG.
2003	Harvest Moon: A Wonderful Life	Marvelous	Fantasy	GCN, PS2	
2003	Harvest Moon: Friends of Mineral Town	Marvelous	Fantasy	GBA	
2003	Harvest Moon: More Friends of Mineral Town	Marvelous	Fantasy	GBA	"Female" version of Harvest Moon: Friends of Mineral Town.
2003	Jurassic Park: Operation Genesis	Blue Tongue	Sci-fi	PS2, WIN, XBOX	Build and manage your own Jurassic Park.
2003	Mall Tycoon 2	Fusion Digital, Virtual Playground	Modern	WIN	Sequel to Mall Tycoon.
2003	Patrician III	Ascaron	Historical	WIN	Add-on to Patrician II, released internationally as a sequel.
2003	Port Royale: Gold, Power and Pirates	Ascaron	Historical	WIN	
2003	Railroad Tycoon 3	PopTop	Historical	MAC, WIN	Sequel to Railroad Tycoon II.
2003	Restaurant Empire	Enlight	Modern	WIN	
2003	RollerCoaster Tycoon 2: Time Twister	Frontier	Modern	WIN	Expansion to RollerCoaster Tycoon 2.
2003	RollerCoaster Tycoon 2: Wacky Worlds	Frontier	Modern	WIN	Expansion to RollerCoaster Tycoon 2.
2003	SeaWorld Adventure Parks Tycoon	Deep Red	Modern	WIN	
2003	Tropico 2: Pirate Cove	Frog City	Historical	OSX, WIN	Sequel to Tropico. Gameplay revolves around running a "pirate island".
2003	Vegas Tycoon	Deep Red	Modern	WIN	
2003	Wildlife Park	JoWood, Encore	Modern	WIN	First title in the series.
2003	X2: The Threat	Egosoft	Sci-fi	LIN, OSX, WIN	Sequel to X: Beyond the Frontier.
2003	Space Colony	Firefly Studios	Sci-fi	WIN	
2004	A-Train 6	Artdink	Modern	PS2	Sixth game in the A-Train series.
2004	Carnival Cruise Line Tycoon 2005: Island Hopping	Artex	Modern	WIN	
2004	Chris Sawyer's Locomotion	Chris Sawyer	Modern	WIN	
2004	Fish Tycoon	Last Day	Modern	DS, iPod, iPhone, MOBI, PALM, PPC, OSX, WIN	
2004	Harvest Moon: Another Wonderful Life	Marvelous	Fantasy	GCN	"Female" version of Harvest Moon: A Wonderful Life.
2004	John Deere: American Farmer	Gabriel	Modern	WIN	
2004	Lemonade Tycoon 2	Jamdat	Modern	MAC, WIN	Sequel to Lemonade Tycoon.
2004	OpenTTD		Modern	LIN, WIN, OSX	Open source game engine based on Transport Tycoon Deluxe. Version 1.0 released April 1, 2010.
2004	Port Royale 2	Ascaron	Historical	WIN	Sequel to Port Royale: Gold, Power and Pirates.
2004	Railroad Tycoon 3: Coast to Coast	PopTop	Historical	WIN	Expansion to Railroad Tycoon 3.
2004	RollerCoaster Tycoon 3	Frontier	Modern	OSX, WIN	Sequel to RollerCoaster Tycoon 2.
2004	School Tycoon	Cat Daddy	Modern	WIN	
2004	Zoo Empire	Enlight	Modern	WIN	
2004	Zoo Tycoon 2	Blue Fang, MacSoft	Modern	MAC, WIN	Sequel to Zoo Tycoon.
2005	Caterpillar Construction Tycoon	Gabriel	Modern	WIN	
2005	Coffee Tycoon	Jamopolis	Modern	WIN	
2005	Geniu$: The Tech Tycoon Game	Radon Labs	Modern	WIN	
2005	Harvest Moon DS Cute	Marvelous	Fantasy	DS	"Female" version of Harvest Moon DS.
2005	Harvest Moon DS	Marvelous	Fantasy	DS	
2005	Harvest Moon: Magical Melody	Marvelous	Fantasy	GCN, Wii	
2005	Mall of America Tycoon	4HEAD	Modern	WIN	
2005	Mall Tycoon 3	Cat Daddy	Modern	WIN	Sequel to Mall Tycoon 2.
2005	Marine Park Empire	Enlight	Modern	WIN	
2005	Playboy: The Mansion	Cyberlore	Modern	PS2, WIN, XBOX	
2005	Prison Tycoon	Virtual Playground	Modern	WIN	First title in the series.
2005	RollerCoaster Tycoon 3: Soaked!	Frontier	Modern	WIN	Expansion to RollerCoaster Tycoon 3.
2005	RollerCoaster Tycoon 3: Wild!	Frontier	Modern	WIN	Expansion to RollerCoaster Tycoon 3.
2005	Tabloid Tycoon	ValuSoft	Modern	WIN	
2005	Movies, The	Lionhead, Robosoft	Modern	OSX, WIN	
2005	Tower SP, The	Vivarium	Modern	GBA	Remake of SimTower.
2005	Wildlife Tycoon	Pocketwatch Games	Modern	WIN, MAC	
2005	X3: Reunion	Egosoft	Sci-fi	LIN, OSX, WIN	Sequel to X2: The Threat.
2005	Zoo Tycoon 2: Endangered Species	Blue Fang	Modern	WIN	Expansion to Zoo Tycoon 2.
2005	Zoo Tycoon DS	Blue Fang	Modern	DS	DS port of the original Zoo Tycoon.
2006	Anno 1701	Related	Historical	DS, WIN	Sequel to Anno 1503: The New World Hybrid with RTS elements.
2006	Virtonomics	Marilana UAB	Modern	WIN	Browser based business simulation
2006	Game Tycoon	Try Synergy	Modern	WIN	
2006	Lionel Trains: On Track	Black Lantern	Modern	DS	
2006	Prison Tycoon 2: Maximum Security	Virtual Playground	Modern	WIN	Sequel to Prison Tycoon.
2006	Rune Factory: A Fantasy Harvest Moon	Neverland	Fantasy	DS	First title in the series. Hybrid with RPG elements.
2006	Sid Meier's Railroads!	Firaxis	Historical	WIN	Sequel to Railroad Tycoon 3.
2006	Movies: Stunts & Effects, The	Lionhead, Robosoft	Modern	OSX, WIN	Expansion to The Movies.
2006	Tycoon City: New York	Deep Red	Modern	WIN	
2006	The Guild 2	4HEAD	Historical	WIN	Sequel to Europa 1400: The Guild.
2006	Wildlife Park 2 (a.k.a. Wildlife Zoo)	Deep Silver	Modern	WIN	Sequel to Wildlife Park.
2006	Zoo Tycoon 2: African Adventure	Blue Fang	Modern	WIN	Expansion to Zoo Tycoon 2.
2006	Zoo Tycoon 2: Dino Danger Pack	Blue Fang	Modern	WIN	Expansion to Zoo Tycoon 2.
2006	Zoo Tycoon 2: Marine Mania	Blue Fang	Modern	WIN	Expansion to Zoo Tycoon 2.
2006	A-Train HX	Artdink	Modern	X360	Eighth game in the A-Train series.
2007	Anno 1701: Dawn of Discovery	Keen	Historical	DS	Hybrid with RTS elements.
2007	Anno 1701: The Sunken Dragon	Related	Historical	WIN	Expansion to Anno 1701 Hybrid with RTS elements.
2007	Catan	Big Huge	Fantasy	XBLA	
2007	Chocolatier	Big Splash	Modern	OSX, WIN	
2007	Freight Tycoon	1C Company	Modern	WIN	
2007	Harvest Moon: Island of Happiness	Marvelous	Fantasy	DS	
2007	Harvest Moon: Tree of Tranquility	Marvelous	Fantasy	Wii	
2007	Hospital Tycoon	DR	Modern	WIN	
2007	IndustryPlayer	Thomas Lehnert	Modern	WEB	
2007	Plant Tycoon	Last Day of Work	Modern	WIN	
2007	Prison Tycoon 3: Lockdown	Virtual Playground	Modern	WIN	Sequel to Prison Tycoon 2: Maximum Security.
2007	Recettear: An Item Shop's Tale	EasyGameStation, Carpe Fulgur	Fantasy	WIN	
2007	Zoo Tycoon 2: Extinct Animals	Blue Fang	Modern	WIN	Expansion to Zoo Tycoon 2. Hybrid with FPS elements.
2008	Prison Tycoon 4: Supermax	Virtual Playground	Modern	WIN	Sequel to Prison Tycoon 3: Lockdown.
2008	Rune Factory 2: A Fantasy Harvest Moon	Neverland	Fantasy	DS	Sequel to Rune Factory: A Fantasy Harvest Moon. Hybrid with RPG elements.
2008	Rune Factory Frontier	Neverland	Fantasy	Wii	Hybrid with RPG elements.
2008	X3: Terran Conflict	Egosoft	Sci-fi	OSX, WIN	Sequel to X3: Reunion.
2008	Zoo Tycoon 2 DS	Blue Fang	Modern	DS	Sequel to Zoo Tycoon DS.
2009	Anno 1404	Related, Ubisoft, Blue Byte	Historical	WIN	Sequel to Anno 1701: Dawn of Discovery. Hybrid with RTS elements.
2009	East India Company	Nitro Games	Historical	WIN	Combines trading, naval warfare, and management.
2009	Eco Tycoon: Project Green	ValuSoft	Sci-fi	WIN	
2009	Restaurant Empire 2	Enlight	Modern	WIN	
2009	Tropico 3	Haemimont Games	Modern	WIN, X360	Sequel to Tropico 2: Pirate Cove. Successor to the original Tropico.
2010	Hotel Tycoon Resort	Claw Design Software	Modern	MOBI	
2010	Patrician IV	Gaming Minds Studios	Historical	WIN	A trading and economics game focused around sea freight.
2010	M.U.D. TV	Realmforge Studios	Modern	WIN	
2011	Tropico 4	Haemimont Games	Modern	WIN, X360	Sequel to Tropico 3.
2011	Cities in Motion	Colossal Order	Modern	WIN, MAC, LIN	
2011	Anno 2070	Related Designs, Blue Byte	Sci-Fi	WIN	Sequel to Anno 1404. Hybrid with RTS elements.
2011	Airline Tycoon 2	b alive, Kalypso	Modern	WIN	
2011	A-Train 9	Artdink	Modern	WIN	Also known as The Train Giant in English and Der Bahn Gigant in German.
2011	Wildlife Park 3	Deep Silver	Modern	WIN	Sequel to Wildlife Park 2
2012	Port Royale 3: Pirates & Merchants	Gaming Minds Studios	Historical	WIN, X360, PS3	Sequel to Port Royale 2
2012	CorsixTH		Modern	WIN, LIN, iOS	Open source implementation of Theme Hospital
2012	Game Dev Tycoon	Greenheart Games	Modern	WIN, MAC, LIN	Single Player Video Game Company Simulator
2013	Cities in Motion 2	Colossal Order	Modern	WIN, MAC, LIN	Sequel to Cities in Motion
2013	Cook, Serve, Delicious!	Vertigo Gaming Inc.	Modern	WIN, MAC, LIN	
2013	World Basketball Manager Tycoon	icehole	Modern	WIN	
2013	Omerta – City of Gangsters	Haemimont Games	Historical	WIN, MAC, X360	Crime simulation game with tactical turn-based combat.
2013	Zoo Tycoon	Frontier	Modern	XOne, X360	Sequel to Zoo Tycoon 2.
2014	A-Train 3D	Artdink	Modern	3DS	Titled A-Train: City Simulator in Europe and North America.
2014	Tropico 5	Haemimont Games	Modern	WIN	Sequel to Tropico 4.
2014	Train Fever	Urban Games	Modern	WIN, MAC, LIN	First game crowdfunded via Gambitious
2015	Automation	Camshaft Software	Modern	WIN	
2015	AdvertCity	VoxelStorm	Sci-fi	WIN, LIN, MAC	An "advertising tycoon game".
2015	Big Pharma	Twice Circled	Modern	WIN, MAC, Steam	A pharmaceutical conglomerate management simulator.
2015	Anno 2205	Blue Byte	Modern	WIN	Sequel to Anno 2070. Hybrid with RTS elements.
2016	Stardew Valley	ConcernedApe	Modern	WIN, MAC, LIN, XOne, PS4, NX, iOS	
2016	RollerCoaster Tycoon World	Nvizzio	Modern	WIN	Successor to RollerCoaster Tycoon 3
2016	Prison Architect	Introversion Software	Modern	WIN, PS4	2D top view prison building and management game.
2016	Project Highrise	SomaSim	Modern	WIN, MAC	
2016	Planet Coaster	Frontier	Modern	WIN	Competitor against RollerCoaster Tycoon World
2016	Youtubers Life	U-Play Online	Modern	WIN, MAC, LIN, iOS	
2016	Transport Fever	Urban Games	Modern	WIN, MAC, LIN	Successor to Train Fever, BUT it's a transport-focused tycoon game.
2017	Freddy Fazbear's Pizzeria Simulator	Scott Cawthon	Modern	WIN	Mixed with survival-horror
2018	Virtonomics Business War	Virtonomics Team	Modern	WEB	MMO browser-based business simulation game (PvP).
2018	Jurassic World Evolution	Frontier	Sci-fi	WIN, PS4, XOne	Build and run a Jurassic World dinosaur park. Similar in gameplay to Jurassic Park: Operation Genesis.
2018	Two Point Hospital	Two Point Studios	Modern	WIN, MAC, LIN, PS4, XOne, NX	Hospital management game.
2018	Virtonomics Entrepreneur	Virtonomics Team	Modern	WEB	MMO browser-based business simulation game for entrepreneurs and startups
2018	X4: Foundations	Egosoft	Sci-fi	WIN, LIN	A dynamic sandbox space simulation game. Sequel to X Rebirth.
2018	Parkitect	Texel Raptor	Modern	WIN, MAC, LIN	Amusement park management game.
2018	Railway Empire	Gaming Minds Studios	Historical	WIN, LIN, PS4, XOne	Railroad tycoon game.
2018	Project Hospital	Oxymoron Games	Modern	WIN	Hospital management game.
2019	Anno 1800	Blue Byte	Historical	WIN	Sequel to Anno 2205. Hybrid with RTS elements.
2019	Tropico 6	Limbic Entertainment	Modern	WIN, MAC, LIN, PS4, PS5, XOne, XSX/S	Sequel to Tropico 5.
2019	Rise of Industry	Dapper Penguin Studios	Modern	WIN, MAC, LIN	Industry business tycoon game
2019	Planet Zoo	Frontier	Modern	WIN	A spiritual successor to the Zoo Tycoon franchise.
2019	Shakedown: Hawaii	VBlank Entertainment	Modern	WIN, 3DS, NX, PS3, PS4, PS5, PSV, Wii, WiiU	Sequel to Retro City Rampage, a Grand Theft Auto type game, but you also focus on conquering the real estate market in a Hawaiian city.
2019	Transport Fever 2	Urban Games	Modern	WIN, LIN	Sequel to Transport Fever, also like its prequel, it's a transport-focused tycoon game.
2020	Empire of Sin	Romero Games	Historical	WIN, MAC, PS4, XOne, NX	You take the role of a mob boss and build your empire through conquest and effective management.
2020	Port Royale 4	Gaming Minds Studios	Historical	WIN	Sequel to Port Royale 3: Pirates & Merchants
2021	NIMBY Rails	Carlos Carrasco	Modern	WIN	Railroad-focused tycoon game.
2021	Jurassic World Evolution 2	Frontier	Sci-fi	WIN, PS4, PS5, XOne, XSX/S	Sequel to Jurassic World Evolution, incorporating gameplay elements from the film Jurassic World Dominion.
2022	The Guild 3	Purple Lamp	Historical	WIN	Sequel to The Guild 2.
2022	Two Point Campus	Two Point Studios	Modern	LIN, MAC, NX, WIN, PS4, PS5, XOne, XSX/S	Successor to Two Point Hospital. University campus management game.
2024	Galacticare	Brightrock Games	Sci-fi	PS5, WIN, XSX/S	Hospital management game.
2025	Two Point Museum	Two Point Studios	Modern	WIN, MAC, LIN, PS5, XSX/S	Successor to Two Point Hospital. Museum management game.
2025	Tiny Bookshop	Neoludic Games	Modern	LIN, WIN, MAC, NX	Running a bookshop.
2026	Global Business Tycoon	Xiro's Studio	Modern	WIN	Management business
2026	VoltStrategist	VoltStrategist Team	Modern	WEB	EV Business Simulation
TBA	Dyson Sphere Program	Youthcat Studio	Sci-fi	WIN	Constructing a Dyson sphere from resources in a star cluster in outer space
TBA	Prehistoric Kingdom	Blue Meridian	Sci-fi	WIN, MAC	Build and manage a zoo of extinct animals. Currently in early access.
TBA	Rise of Industry 2	SomaSim	Modern	WIN	Sequel to Rise of Industry, build your own industrial empire with many different specializations.

== See also ==
- List of city-building video games
- List of roller coaster related video games
- List of simulation video games
