= Airlines (video game) =

1994 video game

- Genre: Simulation
- Developer: Interactivision
- Publisher: Take-Two Interactive
- Platform: MS-DOS
- First release: 1994

Airlines is a construction and management simulation game created by Interactivision for MS-DOS and published by Take-Two Interactive in 1994. The object of the game is to successfully set up an airline by buying aircraft, planning routes, setting ticket prices and dealing with events such as hostage and oil crises. The game has 4 airlines, a minimum of one of which is human controlled. The game begins with the year set as 1970 and as time progresses more aircraft models become available, corresponding with their first flights in reality. The aircraft in the game used real aircraft names, illustrations and model specifications.

== Legacy ==
In October 2002, Interactivison released Airlines 2 with 110 aircraft types, 250 airports with 15 possible regions to start with, and more than 300 routes.

== See also ==
- Air Bucks
- Aerobiz
- Airline Tycoon
- Airport Tycoon
