= Arthur Lewbel =

American economist

- Born: c. 1956 (age 69–70)

Academic background
- Education: Massachusetts Institute of Technology

Academic work
- Discipline: Applied microeconomics and econometrics
- Institutions: Boston College

Arthur Lewbel (born c. 1956) is the inaugural Patrick Roche Professor of Economics at Boston College, and is known in the fields of applied microeconomics and econometrics. He is an editor of Econometric Theory, former co-editor of the Journal of Business and Economic Statistics, a fellow of the Econometric Society, a fellow of the Journal of Econometrics, holds a Multa Scripsit award, and is ranked number 30 on Coupe's list of top economists in the world by publication. Lewbel's economic research is mainly in the areas of micro econometrics and in consumer demand analysis.

Lewbel holds a B.Sc. in mathematics from Massachusetts Institute of Technology (1978), and a doctorate in management (1984) from the same institution.

Lewbel is also known for his juggling contributions including "The Science of Juggling" published in Scientific American, and director and judge for the International Jugglers' Association's national juggling competitions.

Lewbel co-designed the economic simulation video games Make Millions and Run for the Money and the educational software titles The Federal Budget: A Question of Balance (part of the Decisions, Decisions series) and Our Town Meeting.
