= Holiday Island (disambiguation) =

Holiday Island may refer to:

- Holiday Island, Australian television series made by Crawford Productions for Network Ten
- Holiday Island (film), 1957 Italian comedy film
- Holiday Island (1996 video game), business simulation video game developed by German games design company Sunflower
- Holiday Island, Arkansas, census-designated place in Carroll County, Arkansas, United States
- MV Holiday Island, Canadian RORO ferry that operated across the Northumberland Strait from 1971-2022
- Oeno Island, Pitcairn Islands
