= Chancellor of the Exchequer (video game) =

1983 video game

- Publisher(s): Mach-Ina Strategy Games
- Platform(s): Atari 8-bit
- Release: 1983
- Genre(s): Business simulation

Chancellor of the Exchequer is a business simulation game published in 1983 by Mach-Ina Strategy Games for Atari 8-bit computers.

== Gameplay ==
Title screen

Chancellor of the Exchequer is a game in which the player must develop Britain's economy of 1805 while the nation is in chaos.

== Reception ==
Stewart MacKames reviewed the game for Computer Gaming World, and stated that "In the final analysis, Chancellor of the Exchequer will succeed or fail as a game you would like, based upon your enjoyment of economic simulations. Judged as such, the quality of the simulation and the challenge to your ability to succeed greatly out weigh any of its negative aspects."
