= List of PC games (Y) =

The following page is an alphabetical section from the list of PC games.

== Y ==
Name	Developer	Publisher	Genre(s)	Operating system(s)	Date released
Yakuza 0	SEGA	SEGA	Action Adventure, Beat 'em up	Microsoft Windows	1 August 2018
Yakuza 3 Remastered	SEGA	SEGA	Action Adventure, Beat 'em up	Microsoft Windows	28 January 2021
Yakuza 4 Remastered	SEGA	SEGA	Action Adventure, Beat 'em up	Microsoft Windows	28 January 2021
Yakuza 5 Remastered	SEGA	SEGA	Action Adventure, Beat 'em up	Microsoft Windows	28 January 2021
Yakuza 6: The Song of Life	SEGA	SEGA	Action Adventure, Beat 'em up	Microsoft Windows	25 March 2021
Yakuza Kiwami	SEGA	SEGA	Action Adventure, Beat 'em up	Microsoft Windows	19 February 2019
Yakuza Kiwami 2	SEGA	SEGA	Action Adventure, Beat 'em up	Microsoft Windows	9 May 2019
Yakuza: Like a Dragon	Ryu ga Gotoku Studio	SEGA	Role-Playing Game, Beat 'em up	Microsoft Windows	10 November 2020
Youtubers Life	U-Play online	U-Play online	Life simulation, business simulation	Microsoft Windows, Linux, macOS	18 May 2016
Yury	Cubic Pie	Cubic Pie	Action	Microsoft Windows	9 December 2014
