= Make a Million =

Make a Million may refer to:

- Make-A-Million, a card game created by Parker Brothers and released in 1935
- Make a Million (film), a 1935 American film directed by Lewis D. Collins

== See also ==
- Make Millions, a business simulation game released in 1984
