= Gamesphere =

Gamesphere may refer to several fictitious video game consoles. They were often parodies of or non-copyrighted stand-ins for the GameCube.

- GameSphere, from the Drake & Josh episode "The Bet"
- Okama Gamesphere, from the South Park episode, "Towelie"
- The Gamesphere from Game Dev Tycoon.
