= Run for the Money (video game) =

1984 video game

- Developer: Tom Snyder Productions
- Publisher: Scarborough Systems
- Designers: Tom Snyder; Arthur Lewbel
- Platforms: Apple II, Atari 8-bit, Commodore 64, IBM PC, Mac
- Release: 1984
- Genre: Business simulation
- Mode: Multiplayer

Run for the Money is a two-player business simulation game developed by Tom Snyder Productions and published by Scarborough Systems in 1984 for Apple II, Atari 8-bit computers, Commodore 64, IBM PC, and Macintosh. The players have crash-landed their spaceships on an alien planet and compete to buy resources and convert them to goods to sell to locals in order to raise funds to repair their ships.

== Overview ==
The players take the roles of two aliens called Bizlings who have crash-landed their Proto-Ruf Ships on the planet Simian after flying through a zinger storm. The zinger storm has removed the paint from the ships' protective shields. The two players purchase raw materials called Rufs from aliens called Ruffians and use a machine on their ships to convert the Rufs into Synannas, which they sell to local aliens called Simians. Players can purchase low, medium, or high quality rufs, set the price of their Synannas, and spend money on advertising. The goal is to generate enough profit to purchase paint to repair the ship's protective shield and launch through the Simian atmosphere. The game ends when a player successfully launches.

== Reception ==
Compute! called Run for the Money "an interesting game for a broad age group", being both "competitive for adults and fast-moving for children." The reviewer suggested games like it had "the potential to become the modern-day equivalent of the sidewalk lemonade stand for lessons in economics."

Commodore Power/Play called Run for the Money "a very entertaining program as well as a super learning tool" and suggested the game's fast-paced action would "keep your child's attention as he or she learns about the business world."

Creative Computing said the game balanced fun gameplay with teaching "many sophisticated economic concepts, including the laws of supply and demand, bidding practices, production processes, marketing decisions, as well as good old fashioned business sense and customer service".

Family Computing called the game fast-moving and complex but "relatively easy to master" due to the documentation and in-game tutorial. The review play-testers enjoyed the game, although players aged 10 to 15 took longer to grasp the game's concepts.

Enter said the game was enjoyable and would teach players "a lot more about economics than Monopoly did."

K-Power called the game "a typical business situation" despite the bizarre setting, with gameplay that was exciting but not too hectic and time to strategize during the game.

PC Magazine rated the game 16 out of 18, calling it "surprisingly deep" and praising the game manual's "clarity and organization".

Games called Run for the Money a "solid introduction to basic economic principles" and "a lot of fun."

Electronic Games nominated Run for the Money for the 1985 Arkie Award for Best Electronic Money Game. The award was won by Millionaire: The Stock Market Simulation.
