= Golf Resort Tycoon =

2001 video game

- Developer(s): Cat Daddy Games
- Publisher(s): Activision Value
- Platform(s): Windows
- Release: NA: June 1, 2001
- Genre(s): Business simulation
- Mode(s): Single player

Golf Resort Tycoon is a business simulation computer game developed by Cat Daddy Games and published by Activision Value in 2001.

== Gameplay ==
The game is based on the premise of players constructing their own golf resorts with a limited amount of funds hoping to earn more income through the satisfaction of the resort's attendees. There are two gameplay modes: Instant Action and Challenges. Instant Action allows a player to freely create their own golf resort. Challenges requires a player to complete specific series of tasks.

== Reception ==
Most of the reviews for Golf Resort Tycoon stated that it was a mediocre game overall. GameSpot gave it a 6.2, stating "Golf Resort Tycoon can be a nice diversion and a decent way to kill time in short spurts, but it's definitely not for everyone. GameZone rated the game 8 of 10 saying it is challenging and addictive.

=== Sequels ===
A sequel to Golf Resort Tycoon, Golf Resort Tycoon II was released in 2002.
