= Zoo Empire =

2004 video game

- Developer: Enlight Software
- Publisher: Enlight Software
- Director: Trevor Chan
- Producer: Eddy Chan
- Designers: Andy Grimbal; Donald Anderson
- Programmers: Gilbert Luis; Eddy Chan
- Artist: Mantin Lu
- Composer: Sean Kolton
- Platform: Microsoft Windows
- Release: NA: August 4, 2004; EU: September 10, 2004; Marine Park Empire; September 22, 2005
- Genre: business sim
- Mode: Single-player

Zoo Empire (simplified Chinese: 动物园帝国; traditional Chinese: 動物園帝國; pinyin: Dòng Wù Yuán Dì Guó) is a 3D interactive construction and management simulation, much like Zoo Tycoon and Wildlife Park before it. The player must successfully create and manage a zoo that gathers sufficient profits. As the player moves through the game, he will acquire objects that can improve game play. The object of the game is to create a "zoo empire". Zoo Empire has a platinum edition, Marine Park Empire, which added aquariums and marine animals, but also includes the other animals.

== Marine Park Empire ==
Cover art

Marine Park Empire is a platinum edition of Zoo Empire released on September 22, 2005. Marine Park Empire includes major updates such as better AI, new interface, a major graphics update, and overall an easier-to-manage way of running one's empire. Marine Park Empire also introduces new marine animals, but still contains all animals from Zoo Empire. It has 60 animals, over 150 game structures, and 21 scenario scenes.

== Reception ==
=== Zoo Empire ===
Zoo Empire

Aggregate score
Aggregator	Score
Metacritic	59/100

Review scores
Publication	Score
Jeuxvideo.com	10/20
PC Format	62%
PC Gamer (UK)	76%
PC Zone	59%

Zoo Empire received "mixed or average" reviews according to the review aggregation website Metacritic.

=== Marine Park Empire ===
Marine Park Empire

Aggregate score
Aggregator	Score
Metacritic	58/100

Review scores
Publication	Score
Computer Games Magazine	2.5/5
GameZone	7.5/10
IGN	7/10
PC Format	61%
PC Gamer (US)	53%

Marine Park Empire also received "mixed" reviews according to Metacritic.
