= 7 Sins (video game) =

2005 video game

- PAL PC box art
- Developer: Monte Cristo
- Publishers: FRA: Monte Cristo; UK: Digital Jesters
- Engine: RenderWare
- Platforms: Windows, PlayStation 2
- Release: FRA: May 13, 2005; UK: May 20, 2005
- Genre: Life simulation
- Mode: Single-player

7 Sins is a 2005 life simulation video game developed by Monte Cristo and released for Microsoft Windows and PlayStation 2. In the game, the player must get to the top of the social ladder and make decisions related to the seven deadly sins.

== Gameplay ==
The game is set in the fictional Apple City. The player controls a character who wants financial success. Initially, he works as a salesman at Suks, the most luxurious store in the region, using his charm to convince female customers to buy expensive products.

Each character in 7 Sins has a relationship bar that represents their affinity with the protagonist. These bars can be filled with the proper conversations. For female characters, this can lead to a sexual and romantic relationship. For male characters, it can reach "brotherhood".

There are also bars that symbolize the protagonist's mood: sexual arousal, stress and anger. The first and the third are generally reactive to direct stimuli, such as sexual innuendos during a conversation and insults directed at the main character. The second increases when the others remain the same. If one of the bars reaches its maximum, the character gets out of control and loses all the progress in the relationship he was building, leaving the location in the process.

In total there are seven chapters, over 60 individual missions and 100 distinct non-player characters (NPCs) to interact with.

== Development and release ==
Akella originally secured Russian distribution of 7 Sins. Later, in January 2005, Atari announced it would publish the game in PAL territories that March, for PC and PlayStation 2. In March 2005, the UK publisher Digital Jesters signed on to release it that May.

== Reception ==
PC Zone's staff rated the game 6 out of 10, stating "We can't wholeheartedly recommend 7 Sins as a total gaming experience", but added "it honestly isn't anywhere near as bad as some might tell you. They're just too timid to admit it."

Poischich, from Gamekult, praised the variety of characters and expressed mixed feelings about the sometimes decent humor. At the same time, the reviewer was critical of the repetitive minigames, the sound design and the graphics.

== See also ==
- List of PlayStation 2 games (A–K)
