= Skateboard Park Tycoon =

2001 video game

- Developer(s): Cat Daddy Games; Airborne Entertainment
- Publisher(s): Activision
- Platform(s): Windows, Mobile
- Release: NA: September 4, 2001
- Genre(s): Business simulation game
- Mode(s): Single-player

Skateboard Park Tycoon is a 2001 business simulation game developed by Cat Daddy Games for Windows and Airborne Entertainment for mobile, and published by Activision. The game tasks players with creating, managing and skating in a skateboard park. Upon release, the game received mixed reviews, with critics generally praising the game's concept and options for creating skate parks, but critiquing its visual presentation and simplicity. The game generated two sequels, Skateboard Park Tycoon: World Tour 2003 and Skateboard Park Tycoon 2004: Back in the USA.

== Gameplay ==
Overhead view of 'tycoon mode' gameplay.

The game features several modes, including a 'Tycoon' mode that requires players to operate skate parks to generate money and maintain a high rating. Tycoon gameplay is played in a top-down isometric perspective view of the park and can purchase items to place in the area. Items include ramps, bridges, platforms, tubes and benches of different sizes and difficulties which allow park patrons to skate, with easier and more accessible objects attracting and meeting the needs of novice skaters, and difficult objects doing so for more experienced skaters. Players can also place amenities for skaters, including food stands and bars, and 'Sponsors' and 'Skate' shops, which provide income. Economic management of the park requires players to maintain the mood of skaters by meeting their needs through providing items of appropriate difficulty and amenities, whilst maintaining a positive cashflow. Players can skate the parks themselves in first-person perspective.

== Reception ==
Reception

Review scores
Publication	Score
GameSpot	5.4 (Mobile)
CD-Action	5/10
Secret Service Magazine	5/10
Xtreme PC	73%

Skateboard Park Tycoon received mixed reviews upon release. Xtreme PC praised the game as "addictive and full of options", although noting the game's graphical quality was "not up to par" with the gameplay. CD Action found the game to be an "average" title that may "appeal to skateboard enthusiasts", but found the simulation game mechanics lacking, describing them as "too simple", and critiquing the graphics engine as "weak" due to performance issues. Secret Service Magazine similarly assessed the game to be an "average product", commending the "interesting" gameplay and options for customisation, but dismissing the game's graphics as "unattractive" and viewing the game as too similar to other mass-produced Activision simulation titles. Reviewing the mobile version of the game, Jeff Gerstmann of GameSpot considered the game to "look good" with skater and park details, but be overly simple and lack depth to gameplay, noting that it was "difficult to lose" the game.

== Legacy ==
Skateboard Park Tycoon received three sequels developed by Cat Daddy Games. Skateboard Park Tycoon: World Tour 2003 was published in August 2002, allowing players to create parks in international-themed maps. Later sequels included Skateboard Park Tycoon 2004: Back in the USA, and a snowboarding-themed spin-off, Snowboard Park Tycoon 2004: Season Pass, developed by Airborne Entertainment in 2004.
