= AdvertCity =

2015 business simulation game

- Game cover image
- Developer: VoxelStorm
- Publisher: VoxelStorm
- Programmers: Eugene Hopkinson, John Turner
- Composers: Alexandre Caelles, Dorian Pilato
- Platforms: Microsoft Windows, Linux, OS X
- Release: 17 April 2015
- Genre: Tycoon game
- Mode: Single-player

AdvertCity is a business simulation video game developed and published by VoxelStorm. The game was released on 17 April 2015 for Microsoft Windows, Linux, OS X. The player takes on the role of an advertising magnate in a dystopian future city with a cyberpunk aesthetic.

== Gameplay ==
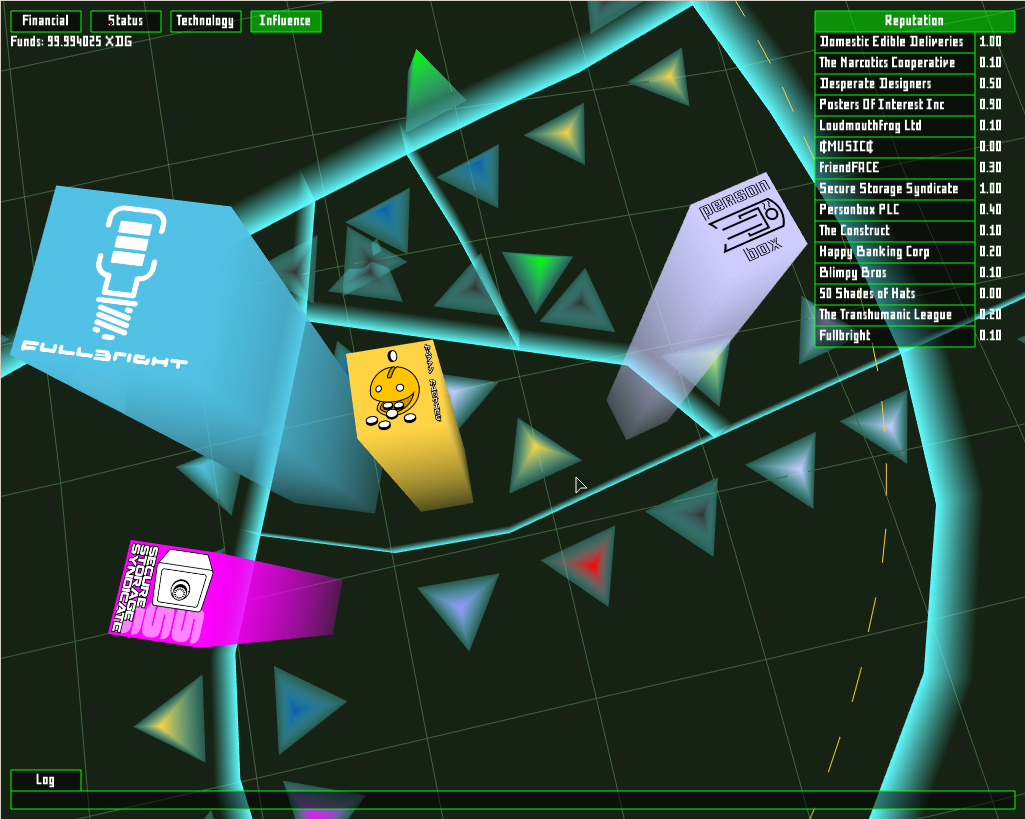
Megacorporations seen in the cyberspace view.

Gameplay in AdvertCity involves selling advertising to client megacorporations; the player does this by moving around the city from a first person god-view perspective, selecting buildings and sites in cyberspace as targets for their advertising. Advertising technologies are unlocked progressively depending on reputation with various megacorporations, and range from flyers to billboards and blimps.

A key mechanic in the game is the ability to switch between meatspace and cyberspace at any time, which is required to perform different actions in each space and to orchestrate advertising effectively.

The goal of the game is to take over the city, and to do this the player must gain the trust of the various megacorporations they interact with.

The game has a roguelike save system to increase the level of challenge - there is only one savegame available, the player has no choice but to save their progress when exiting, and the player cannot reload to a previous state if they make a mistake.

== Development ==
Development of the game began when an early version of the game was built in 7 days for the 2014 Cyberpunk Game Jam. After receiving positive feedback during the jam, the developers decided to continue work on the game to create a full-scale release.

The game sought crowdfunding via Kickstarter on 25 March 2014, and was fully funded on the second day of the campaign, going on be overfunded by 373% at its conclusion.

AdvertCity was submitted to Steam Greenlight during its Kickstarter in 2014 and was eventually greenlit after an unusually long delay in April 2015.

AdvertCity entered a period of closed beta testing during development after its kickstarter; the final release was announced on 17 April 2015, and by June it had appeared on Steam and several other stores.

=== Procedural city generation ===
Every city in the game is procedurally generated.

The procedural city layout is positioned on top of a procedurally generated landscape, which it conforms to and evolves around. The developers considered using the industry standard SIGGRAPH 2001 paper by Parish and Muller as a basis, including the subsequent work on tensor fields, but rejected the use of L-systems on the grounds of their design being unsuited to cities, which "don't grow like branches on a tree".

The system instead uses:

"...maps calculated on a mix of realtime procedural projection and cached data about population layouts and terrain features (such as different terrain types, gradients, altitudes, population densities, whether the region should be considered urban or rural etc); the result is something that has the subtlety of the tensor field system, yet generates much larger cities than are feasible with the L-system at a far higher speed than possible with that design. The AdvertCity generator is an object-oriented system of roads, junctions and buildings that can be adjusted on the fly to interact with their immediate surroundings, so roads meet and cross at specific junctions, branch and fork (something not used in the L system design), and can also spontaneously degenerate from paved roads to footpaths etc as appropriate, due to terrain or other aspects of the landscape. Different classes of road or path can also have entirely different rules and code for how they react to different terrain types and other features, so it's possible to build a much more dynamic overall city map with those."

=== Procedural descriptions ===
Every building in the city has a procedurally generated description; these vary in content but usually mention the architectural style of the building and some information about its history as well as factual info about its current owners and tenants in-game and its population.

All megacorporations are also described with text that is procedurally generated and updated during gameplay as their situation changes; this describes their standing in the city, their relationships with other megacorps, their financial status and their sentiments towards the player.

=== Soundtrack ===
AdvertCity's soundtrack is a full-length score, unusual in that it is presented in two "sides", one for meatspace and one for cyberspace, with each track on each side having a beatmatched equivalent on the other; when the player switches between meatspace and cyberspace, the music smoothly crossfades between the two soundtracks. A bespoke sound engine was developed for this purpose, with EBU R128 2011 support and HDR capability.

== Reception ==
AdvertCity received mixed reviews from critics.

From its initial alpha launch, AdvertCity drew comment widely about its stark and "hyper-stylized" aesthetic. Critics frequently praised the dark neo-noir cyberpunk aesthetic of the game, as well as its tone, and referred to the vision of cyberspace as Gibson-inspired. Stylistically, reviewers appreciated the dystopian bleakness of the vision of the future in the game, mentioning that your adverts are the only splashes of colour on the cold and uniform city, and the surreal building-linked conception of cyberspace. Reviewers also praised the dark and cynical sense of humour throughout the game. Reviewers also expressed interest in the Oculus Rift support which was included in the game from the alpha stage. One common complaint is the high level of difficulty and steep learning curve at the start of the game. Reviewers also cited the disorientating nature of the interface and immutable fast pace of the game as a negative. The developers cited games such as Dwarf Fortress as an inspiration, which is well known for its steep learning curve and difficult interface.

The game also drew praise for its high-performing engine, which enables the game to run on previous-generation hardware; the minimum system requirements for CPU on Steam are stated simply as "Anything made since 2004" and the game supports Windows XP despite Microsoft having discontinued support for that operating system before development of AdvertCity began.

Critics praised the "cyber-jazz" soundtrack's "postrock, jazz & glitch" qualities and praised the way it dovetails with the gameplay and "backs your every move" in the game.
