= Industry Giant II =

2002 video game

- Developer(s): JoWooD Productions
- Publisher(s): JoWooD Productions (Note: 2016 re-release published by UIG Entertainment.)
- Platform(s): Windows; PlayStation 4; Xbox One
- Release: Windows: EU: June 28, 2002; AU: July 5, 2002; NA: September 25, 2002; PlayStation 4, Xbox One: WW: December 20, 2016
- Genre(s): Business simulation
- Mode(s): Single-player, multiplayer

Industry Giant II (German: Der Industriegigant II) is a business simulation game for Windows. It is the sequel to Industry Giant. Despite a wide range of aspects Industry Giant II is not a complete business simulation game, as many management aspects such as finance, sourcing or HR are hardly present. The 'free game' option allows the player not to worry about turning a profit. The game is primarily considered to be a supply chain simulator, because many aspects of strategic, tactical and operational supply chain management are experienced. Next to this, the structure of the game allows the player to understand how supply chains can be modeled. From that point of view, playing Industry Giant II can be beneficial in order to understand how enterprise supply chain software is modeling existing supply chains.

The game received a high-definition re-release in 2016.

== Add-ons ==
- Industry Giant II: 1980-2020 is an official expansion set available from December 6, 2002. It includes new products such as biofuels, flatscreen TVs and compact music players suitable for the extended time period.
- Industry Giant II: Gold Edition includes the Industry Giant II: 1980-2020 add-on and some other minor tweaks to the game, released on October 31, 2003.
