= Big Biz Tycoon! 2 =

2003 video game

Big Biz Tycoon 2
- Developer(s): 4HEAD Studios
- Publisher(s): Activision Value
- Platform(s): Microsoft Windows
- Release: NA: June 12, 2003
- Genre(s): Business simulation game
- Mode(s): Single-player

Big Biz Tycoon 2 is a business simulation game centered on the business world. Similar to other games in this genre, the player aims to become a mogul of an industry. It was developed for Microsoft Windows by 4HEAD Studios, and published by Activision Value.

== Gameplay ==
The objective of the game is to create a successful business by developing and creating products. For selling them, the player earns money, which enables him to hire employees and decorate the office building. These workers can be assigned to projects according to their strengths, and must then develop and market a product.

== Reception ==
GameSpot critic gave the game a 3.7/10 while the 29 users gave an average of 5.8.

== See also ==
- Big Biz Tycoon
