= Mall of America Tycoon =

- Developer: 4HEAD Studios
- Publisher: Activision
- Platform: Microsoft Windows 98/ME/2000/XP
- Release: USA: September 28, 2004
- Genre: Business simulation game
- Mode: Single-player

Mall of America Tycoon is a business simulation game developed by 4HEAD Studios and published by Activision and released on September 28, 2004, for Windows. The goal is to successfully create and run a mall based on the real Mall of America in Bloomington, Minnesota. The player must manage the income, store contracts, and special event days. However, unlike other tycoon games, there is a way to win a freeplay game.

== Gameplay ==
The player starts out with an empty mall, on which they must develop their mall. Options for building include the normal stores and restaurants, but also other items commonly found in malls, such as benches and small plant life. The mall must be developed in such a way that it is profitable, which in turn lets the player add more items. For example, the player can schedule promotions such as the Day of Discounts to draw more people into the mall. Also, a new attraction at Camp Snoopy, the large amusement park in the center of the mall can help attract more people to the mall.

After the player develops the first area sufficiently, another section of the mall is unlocked. There are sixteen sections which need to be developed, and the game is completed when the last one is complete.

== History ==
This game is similar to Mall Tycoon, both in concepts and features. However, this game is compatible with Microsoft Windows 2000 and XP, while Mall Tycoon only supports the preceding versions of Windows. Eventually, Mall Tycoon 2 and Mall Tycoon 3 were released to compete for the market. To this day, the production of sequels for both this game and Mall Tycoon has stopped.
