= Squire: The Financial Planning Simulation =

1984 video game

- Publisher: Blue Chip Software
- Platforms: Apple II, Commodore 64, Mac, MS-DOS
- Release: 1984
- Genre: Business simulation

Squire: The Financial Planning Simulation is a business simulation video game published in 1984 by Blue Chip Software for Apple II, Commodore 64, Mac, and MS-DOS.

== Gameplay ==
Squire: The Financial Planning Simulation is a game in which the player is an investor who can invest in the stock market, commodities, real estate, bonds, collectibles, money market accounts, IRAs, oil and gas exploration, and cattle feeding.

== Reception ==
Johnny Wilson reviewed the game for Computer Gaming World, and stated that "Squire is an excellent simulation within a series of excellent simulations. As a game, it is slower moving than Tycoon and Millionaire, but faster paced than Baron."
