= Wildlife Park 3 =

- Developer: Deep Silver
- Publisher: B-Alive
- Engine: K2 Engine
- Platform: Microsoft Windows
- Release: UK: March 25, 2011; GER: March 25, 2011; US: April 8, 2011
- Genre: Business simulation
- Mode: Single player

Wildlife Park 3 is a business simulation game game released in March 2011 in the United Kingdom. It is a sequel to Wildlife Park 2.

== Game play ==
Wildlife Park 3 is a 3-D business simulation involving building, maintaining, and amending a zoo, with the goal of keeping a steady income and happy visitors. 20 different missions are presented to players to choose from; freeplay mode is also available. The game features weather cycles, which affects guests, plants, and animals.

== Development ==
The game was completed just a few weeks before its March 25, 2011 release date.

== Downloadable Content ==
=== Dino Invasion ===
The first downloadable content pack, Wildlife Park 3 - Dino Invasion, was released on June 2, 2017. It adds 10 dinosaur species, 12 buildings, 10 decorative objects, and 4 plants.

=== Alaska ===
On September 22, 2017, B-Alive released Wildlife Park 3 - Alaska, the second downloadable content for the game. The pack adds 17 species native to the State, as well as a number of new forms of transportation, 11 buildings, and 10 decorative items.

=== Creatures of the Caribbean ===
Wildlife Park 3 - Creatures of the Caribbean was released on December 22, 2017. It includes 20 species native to the region, 14 buildings, 14 decorative objects, and 4 plants.

=== Down Under ===
Wildlife Park 3 - Down Under was released on April 19, 2018. It adds 20 Australian animals, 13 buildings, 7 decorative objects, and 2 species of eucalyptus tree.

=== Amazonas ===
Wildlife Park 3 - Amazonas was released on September 28, 2018. This pack includes 16 South American species, 8 buildings, and 5 decorative items.

=== Africa ===
Released on November 16, 2018, Wildlife Park 3 - Africa features 15 African species, 5 buildings, and 5 decorative items.

=== Asia ===
Wildlife Park 3 - Asia is the final expansion in the Wildlife Park series, which released on June 7, 2019. It is the first DLC ack for this game to only include new animal species, of which there are 15 new additions.

== Critical reception ==
Reception

Review scores
Publication	Score
Joystick	13/20
PC Games (DE)	7/10
PC Action	74/100

PC Games praised the game's graphics but noted that many textures do not look as good while close-up in first person mode.

Tom from Calm Down Tom described the game's dialog as being "awful" and particularly disliked the tutorial guide.
