= Aerobiz Supersonic =

1993 business simulation game

- Developer: Koei
- Publisher: Koei
- Series: Koei Executive Series
- Platforms: Super NES; Genesis; PC-98 (Japanese); Windows (Japanese); MS-DOS (Chinese, Korean)
- Release: Super NES: JP: April 1993; NA: August 1994; Genesis: JP: February 18, 1994; NA: January 1995
- Genre: Business simulation
- Modes: Single-player, multiplayer

Aerobiz Supersonic, known as Air Management II: Kōkū Ō wo Mezase (エアーマネジメントII 航空王をめざせ) in Japan, is a business simulation video game released for the Super Nintendo Entertainment System by Koei in North America in August 1994. It was later ported to the Genesis. It is a sequel to Koei's previous airline simulation game, Aerobiz.

== Gameplay ==
Screenshot of a game of Aerobiz Supersonic, taking place in 1957.

Aerobiz is a tycoon game in which one to four players assume the role of CEO of an airline and compete to dominate the market. The game features four scenarios spanning different eras of aviation in the past, present and future. Players select a name for their airline company, a home city and one of five skill levels. Gameplay consists of purchasing and maintaining planes, negotiating new routes and advertising. Players establish new routes by assigning directors of their company to bid for slots in airports at other cities, and assigning planes to them. The number of flights in available slots, and the price of fares, can be adjusted to maximize the profit of routes. Holding a board meeting allows players to receive advice from their company's directors on the performance of routes and potential adjustments.

== Reception ==
Reception

Review scores
Publication	Score	
Publication	Sega Genesis	SNES
Electronic Gaming Monthly	6.6/10	7.2/10
GamePro		3.5/5
Next Generation	3/5	

Aerobiz Supersonic received positive reviews upon release, and sold 57,000 units. VideoGames selected it as a runner-up for 1994's Best Strategy Game award, which was won by Equinox.
