= Micro Commandos =

2002 video game

- Developer(s): Monte Cristo
- Publisher(s): EU: Monte Cristo; NA: Strategy First
- Platform(s): Windows
- Release: FRA: June 2002; UK: June 28, 2002; NA: September 26, 2002
- Genre(s): Real-time strategy
- Mode(s): Single Player

Micro Commandos is a Windows game developed and published by Monte Cristo. The player controls tiny aliens from another planet to look for a so-called "Ultimate Weapon". They lead the aliens through 14 missions in the world of "the big people" exploring unusual settings like a museum, subway, pizzeria.... The player has to collect resources of food and material to feed and construct vehicles and buildings for the aliens. They also have to fight off another alien race looking for the Ultimate Weapon as well as bugs, hamsters and the family cat.
