= Virtonomics =

Massively multiplayer business simulation video game

- Website type: Business simulation game, Massively multiplayer online game, Strategy Game, Turn-based, strategy games, business game, Simulation, serious games, Tycoon games
- Available in: English; French; German; Russian; Spanish; Ukrainian
- Owner: Gamerflot Trading LTD
- Creator: Virtonomics Team
- Website: virtonomics.com
- Registration: Required
- Launched: December 11, 2006

Virtonomics is a massively multiplayer business simulation video game developed by Cyprus indie developer Gamerflot. It allows the players to be in charge of fictional start-ups in several industries. There are three different versions available: Entrepreneur, Business War and Tycoon.

== Gameplay ==
Virtonomics resembles Trevor Chan's business simulation game Capitalism 2. It simulates the basic principles and processes of businesses in a competitive environment. There are no predefined victory or failure conditions, and the game does not end. Players define their own end goals for the game, and try achieve them using strategy and tactics. Typically, the main goal is to build a successful business amidst competition.

Virtonomics is a multiplayer game, and players mainly interact with other players as well as with a computer-controlled opponent. It is turn-based game, and each turn lasts a fixed length of time. Generally, turns are a day long, and for a regular player, the game required 15 to 60 minutes a day. In 2014, the developers released a "fast realm", a game server where turns were an hour long; this was designed for players in short-term business training.

Currently Virtonomics has six realms: Vera, Olga, Mary, Lien, Fast and Anna.

In the game, players may engage in agriculture, exploitation of natural resources, manufacturing, retail, foreign exchange market trade, finance, personnel management, marketing, logistics, scientific research and other business processes.

== History ==
Virtonomics is developed by GamerFlot Trading Ltd. A prototype of Virtonomics called Money Mania was released in 2004, and it ran as a non-commercial project for a few years. On 11 December 2006, Money Mania was renamed Virtonomics, and released in the Russian language. The game was named by Game World Navigator as the best economic online game of 2007. The game entered the global market in 2009 with a freemium model, and was translated to several other languages. Since 2015, Virtonomics developers have begun to develop the direction of educational business simulations for training students and aspiring entrepreneurs. This business simulation is regularly featured in ratings and reviews of economic and strategy games recommended for management and entrepreneurship education.
