= Industry Giant =

1997 business simulation video game

- Developer: JoWooD Productions
- Publishers: EU: JoWooD Productions; NA: Interactive Magic
- Platform: Windows
- Release: EU: 1997; NA: April 29, 1998; WW: 2001 (rerelease)
- Genre: Business simulation game
- Mode: Single player

Industry Giant (German: Der Industriegigant) is a business simulation game for Windows. In 2002 a sequel, Industry Giant II, was released.

== Reception ==
Reception

Aggregate score
Aggregator	Score
Metacritic	34/100

Review scores
Publication	Score
CNET Gamecenter	7/10
Computer Games Strategy Plus	(1998) 3.5/5 (2001) 1.5/5
Computer Gaming World	(1998) 1.5/5 (2001) 1/5
GameZone	7.5/10
IGN	(1998) 5/10 (2001) 3.2/10
Next Generation	4/5
PC Gamer (UK)	72%
PC Gamer (US)	58%
PC Games (DE)	77%
PC Zone	(1998) 53% (2001) 0%

The game received "unfavorable" reviews according to the review aggregation website Metacritic. However, Next Generation said, "Industry Giant is presented well, with polished graphics and an upbeat soundtrack. It may not have mass market appeal, but it is a solid enough game to keep sim fans salivating for a long time."

The game was a commercial blockbuster, with sales above 800,000 units in Germany.
