= Rise of Industry =

- Developer: Dapper Penguin Studios
- Publisher: Kasedo Games
- Platforms: Windows, macOS, Linux
- Release: May 2, 2019
- Genre: Tycoon
- Mode: Single-player

Rise of Industry is a business tycoon game developed by Spanish indie team Dapper Penguin Studios and published by Kasedo Games. The game sees players build and manage their industrial empires as they attempt to grow and expand in the early 20th century.

The game was released to early access on February 9, 2018, primarily through Steam and GOG, until it was released as a full release on May 2, 2019. The Rise of Industry IP was sold to an unknown buyer in early 2022. Rise of Industry 2 was announced in February 2024 and released on June 3, 2025 for the PlayStation 5, Windows, and Xbox Series X/S.

== Gameplay ==
In Rise of Industry, a player begins with a sum of money and a map on which to build, which is shared with several AI-controlled towns and villages. It is the player's aim to build an industrial empire by supplying these towns and villages with the products they demand.

There are currently two main game modes, Career and Sandbox. In Career mode, the player must choose a specialism in which to begin their empire. There are four specialisms to choose from: Gathering, Farming, Industry, and Logistics. While all remain open for the player to use, the chosen specialism will grant more Research & Development points, which are used to upgrade in the tech tree. In Sandbox mode, all unlocks are available and the player can build without research and financial limitations.

The game is played on a map that is broken up into regions, each requiring the player to buy a permit in order to build within that region. There are two permit types: a full build permit, which enables the player to build anything within that region, and a logistical permit, which allows the placement of network elements such as railway tracks and roads but not buildings. The player can then start to place buildings, such as factories, farms, and gatherers, and then sell products to towns and villages that require them. The price paid for products is set by a global supply and demand system. The more of a product that is available, the less money the player will receive for it; however, towns will pay a premium for goods that aren't as plentiful. Towns don't just rely on the player to get products, though; they will either look to produce a demanded item themselves or look for a trade connection with a neighbouring town.

Trade routes play a large role in the game as a means to move products between locations. The player can create a trade routes for a variety of modes of transport, including trucks, boats, trains, and zeppelins, with each mode having advantages over another depending on the distance and capacity on the route.

== Development ==
The game was originally named Project Automata in early development. Its name was changed to Rise of Industry in early 2017.

Rise of Industry was released as a pre-alpha version on indie video game store itch.io in order to gain player feedback and improve gameplay before the official early access release. During this time, Rise of Industry became the most-purchased game of 2017 on Itch.

== Reception ==
Reception

Aggregate score
Aggregator	Score
Metacritic	62/100

Rock Paper Shotgun said that Rise of Industry's early access release was "full of neat ideas" but that "they might wait until further updates to play again". PC Gamer called it a "fairly deep sim", although they thought that the lack of flexibility in the game "could put people off". Hardcore Gamer, on the other hand, praised Dapper Penguin Studios for "their total openness to their community" and "great willingness to listen to player feedback", stating, "this is exactly how an Early Access release should be handled".
