= Subway Builder =

2026 transit video game

- Developer: Colin Miller
- Platforms: Windows; macOS; Linux
- Release: Public Beta: October 09, 2025; WW: February 10, 2026; Steam: July 17, 2026
- Genres: Construction and management simulation; Train simulation
- Mode: Single-player

Subway Builder is a 2026 transit simulation game by independent developer Colin Miller. The game is a single-player railroad construction and management simulator. Players build subway systems in real-world cities by constructing tracks and stations under realistic constraints and costs. They also design routes and manage operations to serve commuters simulated using real-world census data.

== Gameplay ==
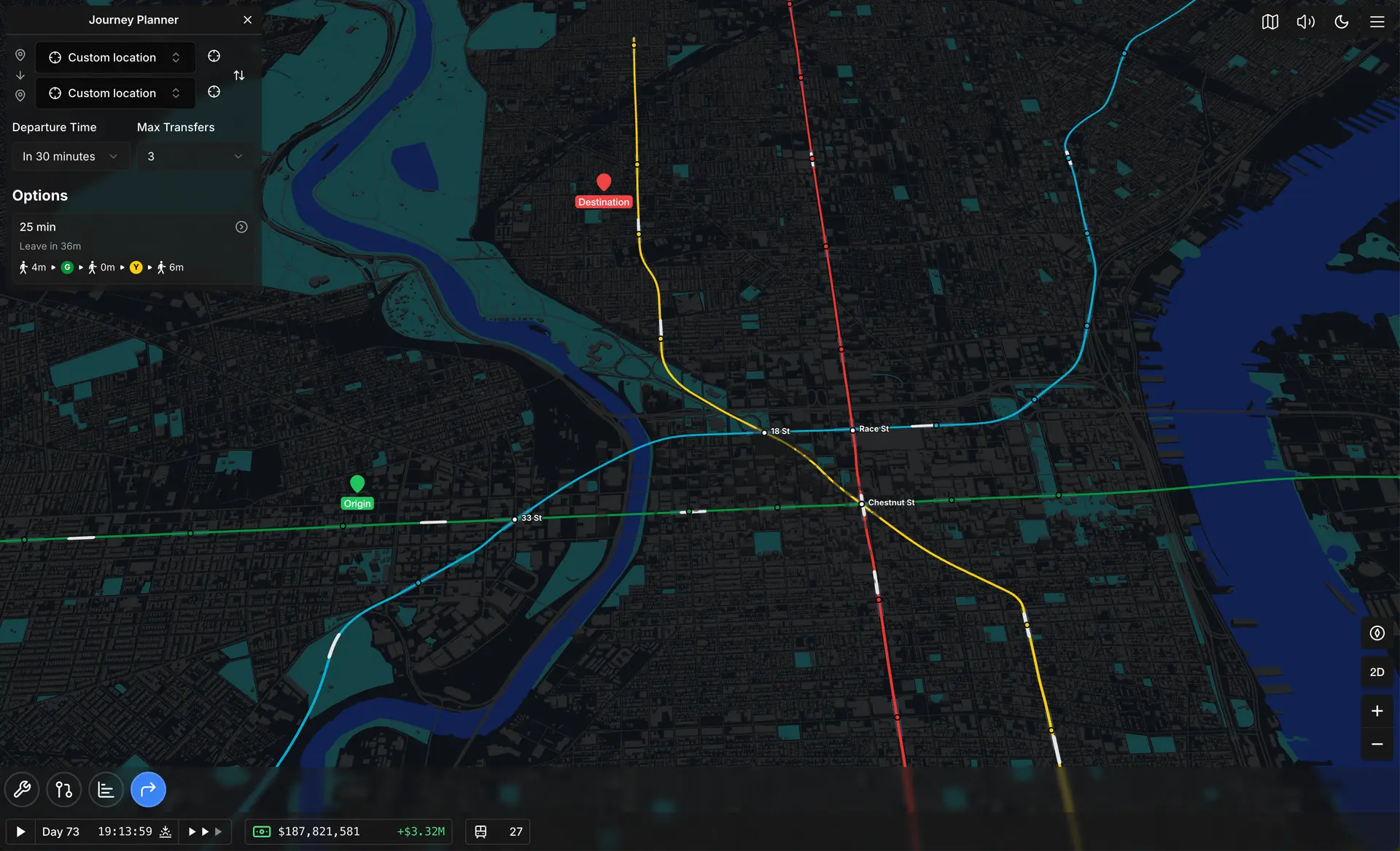
A screenshot of gameplay on the Philadelphia map.

The player starts with a map of their selected city accurately populated with its road network, buildings and topographical features. The player builds subway stations and tracks in the city. Tracks can be built at different elevations to navigate the city and landscape. The player can build elevated and at grade tracks as well as tunnels at numerous depths. Four types of tracks and trains are available; heavy and light metro, light rail, and commuter rail. Heavy metro cost more to build and maintain than light. Heavy metro trains are based on the New York City Subway R211 stock, allowing up to 15 cars. Light metro trains are based on the Montreal REM Alstom Metropolis Saint-Laurent stock, allowing up to 4 cars. Light rail trains are based on the Seattle Link Siemens S700 light rail vehicles. Commuter rail trains are based on the Long Island Rail Road M9 trains. Heavy and light metro are used to connect nearby areas with fast acceleration but a lower top speed, while commuter rail is used to connect area farther away with a low acceleration but higher top speed. The player can use various data analysis tools to see where residents and workers are concentrated and their daily commutes to plan the locations of stations and direction of routes.

Once stations and tracks are built, the player then designs the routes that trains will travel on their subway system. Players choose the route's name and color, stations serviced, and route frequency. Commuters use a combination of vehicles, transit and walking to reach their destination, and the player can see how their services impact this behavior and where improvements in their system can be made.

Construction costs are based on the cost-per-mile of transit construction outside of the United States. Transit construction costs in the US are generally between 2 and 5 times higher than other parts of the world, using overseas pricing was "the only way the game would be playable". There is also a sandbox mode, allowing players to freely build and run the simulation without budget constraints.

=== Simulation ===
The game's simulation assigns generated commuters with home and work locations across a city map using a distance-based gravity model based on census data. The simulation then generates passenger flow and demand by making decisions for each commuter about the best way for them to travel based on travel time, cost and time of day. Commuter experience is also accounted for, with commuters discouraged by delayed or cancelled services. College student and airport commuters are also simulated with different travel behavior. There is a known problem where the simulated commuters prefer to avoid transfers, affecting travel time and commuter use.

=== Maps ===
There are 56 maps available as of October 2026 which include 55 cities available to play, and one sandbox map. Additional maps are planned for future release.

Maps
| City | Country | Population (Millions) | Size (Thousands KM^{2}) | Difficulty |
|---|---|---|---|---|
| Atlanta | United States | 2.9 | 5.3 | Hard |
| Auckland | New Zealand | 0.9 | 31 | Medium |
| Austin | United States | 1.3 | 6.8 | Hard |
| Baltimore | United States | 1.0 | 1.2 | Medium |
| Birmingham | United Kingdom | 1.2 | 1.6 | Medium |
| Boston | United States | 2.3 | 6.9 | Easy |
| Charlotte | United States | 1.1 | 4.1 | Hard |
| Chicago | United States | 4.0 | 6.7 | Easy |
| Cincinnati | United States | 1.1 | 1.9 | Hard |
| Cleveland | United States | 0.9 | 2.2 | Hard |
| Columbus | United States | 0.9 | 2.4 | Hard |
| Dallas | United States | 3.8 | 7.2 | Very Hard |
| Denver | United States | 1.8 | 4.3 | Medium |
| Detroit | United States | 1.7 | 4.1 | Very Hard |
| Dublin | Ireland | 1.0 | 17 | Easy |
| Geneva | Switzerland | 0.8 | 23 | Medium |
| Hiroshima | Japan | 1.1 | 33 | Medium |
| Honolulu | United States | 0.5 | 10 | Easy |
| Houston | United States | 2.8 | 5.1 | Hard |
| Indianapolis | United States | 0.9 | 2.5 | Hard |
| Kansas City | United States | 1.2 | 30 | Hard |
| Liverpool | United Kingdom | 1.0 | 1.2 | Medium |
| London | United Kingdom | 5.4 | 2.9 | Very Easy |
| Los Angeles | United States | 6.3 | 6.4 | Medium |
| Lyon | France | 1.2 | 24 | Easy |
| Manchester | United Kingdom | 1.1 | 1.1 | Medium |
| Marseille | France | 1.2 | 26 | Easy |
| Miami | United States | 3.0 | 6.4 | Hard |
| Milwaukee | United States | 1.0 | 2.1 | Hard |
| Minneapolis | United States | 1.6 | 3.6 | Hard |
| Nagoya | Japan | 5.9 | 33 | Medium |
| Nashville | United States | 0.9 | | Very Hard |
| New Orleans | United States | 0.6 | 37 | Very Hard |
| New York City | United States | 8.3 | 2.2 | Very Easy |
| Newcastle | United Kingdom | 0.6 | 0.9 | Hard |
| Null Island | N/A | 0 | | N/A |
| Osaka | Japan | 9.5 | 33 | Easy |
| Paris | France | 5.9 | 21 | Very Easy |
| Philadelphia | United States | 2.9 | 3.8 | Easy |
| Phoenix | United States | 2.4 | 6.9 | Very Hard |
| Pittsburgh | United States | 0.8 | 2.4 | Medium |
| Portland | United States | 1.3 | 1.7 | Medium |
| Raleigh | United States | 0.9 | | Hard |
| Sacramento | United States | 1.1 | | Hard |
| Salt Lake City | United States | 1.0 | 2.1 | Hard |
| San Diego | United States | 1.7 | 3.9 | Medium |
| San Francisco | United States | 3.7 | 15 | Easy |
| Sapporo | Japan | 1.5 | 26 | Medium |
| Seattle | United States | 2.0 | 5.5 | Easy |
| Sendai | Japan | 0.9 | 30 | Medium |
| St. Louis | United States | 1.3 | 3.4 | Very Hard |
| Tokyo | Japan | 16.5 | 65 | Very Easy |
| Washington DC | United States | 2.7 | 5.4 | Easy |
| Wellington | New Zealand | 0.3 | 28 | Hard |
| Zurich | Switzerland | 1.5 | 22 | Easy |

== Development ==
Miller posted on January 10, 2025, that he was working on a "game where you can build a subway network".

He says that he was inspired to create Subway Builder by his experience with a broken down 6 train during a commute home using the NYC Subway, where he thought, "maybe I can make a better [subway system]". Originally considering it a small project, he decided to build out a full game after a video of an early demo gained significant social media attention.

To create the maps and inform the simulation, Miller drew on real-world datasets such as from the United States census, Department of Education, Federal Aviation Administration and OpenStreetMap, as well as his database Redistricter.

== Release ==
Subway Builder was released as a public beta on Windows, macOS and Linux platforms on October 9, 2025. It continues to be updated with additional features and fixes. Miller and E.J. Fox released their first major "International Expansion" on December 10, 2025, which added the five UK cities now present in the game. Version 1.0 was released on February, 10, 2026.

As of October 2025, Subway Builder is available on the game's website, planned to release on Steam in spring 2026. On June 4, 2026, it was announced on the game developer's Twitter page that the game would release on Steam on July 17, 2026. The game released on Steam on July 17, 2026.

== Reception ==
Subway Builder received positive social media attention both prior to launch and on release. Journalists noted the game's "addictive" quality, as well as its realistic simulation. Fast Company noted: "many developers have tried to gamify transit design with offerings like MetroConnect, Brand New Subway, and Mini Metro. But few have attempted to make their simulations realistic enough to replicate real transit-planning challenges at the scale of cities like New York or Seattle."

The game was also noted for its potential as a tool for "public imagination" in promoting and developing public transit in the United States.

The game saw mixed reviews on Steam after launch.

== See also ==
- NIMBY Rails, a similar transit simulation game.
