= Casino Tycoon (video game) =

2001 video game

- Developer: Cat Daddy Games
- Publishers: Monte Cristo and Davilex Games
- Platform: PC
- Release: US: December 15, 2001
- Genre: Business simulation
- Mode: Single-player

Casino Tycoon, released in some regions as Casino Mogul, is a tycoon type of game where players aspire from a small unknown to a tycoon in the casino business.

== Game features ==
This game features characters such as Marlon Brando from The Godfather. One mission is for players to become the first casino to attain Five-star rating or make 50,000 pounds. Players control all aspects of the casino, including hiring staff, buying casinos, and managing the day-to-day operations. The basic aim of the game is to own and manage a casino.

== Reception ==
Reception

Aggregate score
Aggregator	Score
Metacritic	52/100

Review scores
Publication	Score
IGN	6.2/10
Games Domain	2/5 stars

Casino Tycoon received mixed to negative reviews from critics upon release. On Metacritic, the game holds a score of 52/100 based on 4 reviews, indicating "mixed or average reviews".

Staci Krause of IGN rated it 6.2/10 and wrote that the game, while initially fun, becomes too easy to have long-term entertainment value.
