= Medieval Lords: Build, Defend, Expand =

2004 video game

- Developer(s): Monte Cristo Multimedia
- Publisher(s): Monte Cristo Multimedia
- Platform(s): Windows
- Release: UK: October 29, 2004; NA: November 24, 2005
- Genre(s): Strategy
- Mode(s): Single player

Medieval Lords is a video game released in 2004 by the French company Monte Cristo Multimedia.

It plays like a medieval version of SimCity being like a city building game where the violence and battles take a back seat to village management like providing food, entertainment, religious amenities and transit to your peasants so you can collect taxes on them.

One of the uncommon features in the game is that you can enter a first person view and walk around your own town as if you were a villager.
