= Ports of Call (video game) =

1986 video game

- Developers: Rolf-Dieter Klein; Martin Ulrich
- Publisher: Aegis Interactive Entertainment
- Platforms: Amiga, MS-DOS iOS, Android, Windows
- Release: 1987

Ports of Call is a business simulation game developed by German duo Rolf-Dieter Klein and Martin Ulrich, and published in 1987 by Aegis Interactive Entertainment. It was initially released for AmigaOS, then MS-DOS. Much later, it was converted to Windows, iOS, Android, and as a browser game.

== Gameplay ==
The game simulates the management of a global freight transport company, where the player charters freight, and, using the accumulated profit, can buy more and better ships. Minigames include manually piloting your ship into a specified berth in the harbour and picking up survivors from a liferaft. The original version provided multiplayer capability in the form of hot seat.

== Reception ==
Roy Wagner reviewed the game for Computer Gaming World, and stated that "Ports of Call provides plenty of challenge without being bogged down with lots of economic details."
