= Merchise =

Merchise was a Computer Software group created circa 1991 at University "Marta Abreu" of Las Villas, in Santa Clara city, Cuba. It was founded by Ing. Medardo Rodriguez who desired to create a Computer Programming Research Team with headquarters in Las Villas U but formed by people with spontaneous and free ideas about what a computer team and software should be. The Merchise name per-se was an idea of the other co-founder Ing. Miguel Cepero and it refers to Mayan wizard deity (in Spanish).

== History ==
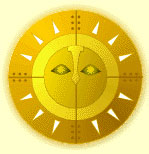
Merchise Logo

Despite the fact it was feed from students from different departments of the U like Electrical, Computer Sciences, Mechanic, Industrial and Chemistry Departments producing code and graphics during their free time and night shifts the group manage to quickly be noticed not only at its original Campus but nationwide. Fame that probably played a strong role in the rise and fall of it. As "free thinking" was one of the premises of the team, most of its members had the strong will to create a niche market for Cuban video games. But in a society where games were consider at the time harmful and thus playing was forbidden at all times at all schools a team willing to create games was soon perceived as the black sheep and set to extinction.

After trying and failing with "Axthor" a 2D arcade quite similar in style to Delphine Software's Another World a good opportunity opened for the group at this activity when "La Fortaleza: en las entrañas de la Bestia" (The Fortress:inside the Beast's guts) or just Fortaleza I, a text RPG created by Cepero himself gain positive reviews in Cuba and Mexico. Soon after several games start to develop at Merchise studios, Fortaleza II (La venganza de la bestia|The Beast's revenge) was one of it, but most important was a project named "Escape del Castillo de la Fisica" (Escape from Physic's Castle) a visual point-and-click game in the fashion of LucasArts Indiana Jones and the Fate of Atlantis or the Monkey Island (series).

By end of 1994 Escape had a multi department team working on it with the full approval of the University authorities that so far considered the dissolution of the group. Since Escape was meant to solve Physics problems a team of two teachers from that Department joined the project and it was tested several times with children from different grades and schools and it finally proved that gaming was a reliable tool to teach all along.

Special mention deserves Merchise's own engine creation tool known as "Magister Ludi" what could be at that time compared, again, to LucasArt's SCUMM. All games and several other types of interactive environments were created using Magister Ludi all over the University's Departments.

Proven themselves as top programmers and designers of their time, in 1995 Merchise Group finally got their dream chance when Canadian software developers Oceanus Communications came along with a very ambitious project for software developing involving Massively multiplayer online games, Internet Media Integration and more.

== Ottawa era ==
From late 1997 to 2003, year when it finally was dismantled, most of members of former Merchise group had joined Oceanus Communications in Ottawa, Ontario, Canada in their joint quest to conquer International markets. Important from this period were visionary projects like;

Skipper, online integration (WEB, FTP, Mail, News client and explorer)

Netris Kombat, a Tetris style game but with net multiuser platform and weapons/defenses concept.

Legacy Online former Starpeace, a massive multiplayer world simulation game at the style of SimCity.

Since its release in December 2000 and after several ups and downs Starpeace came back in a server in July 2008 due to fan intervention. Currently there are only a couple of worlds being hosted, Zyrane and Planitia. It can be seen hosted at, http://www.starpeaceonline.com .

== Gallery ==
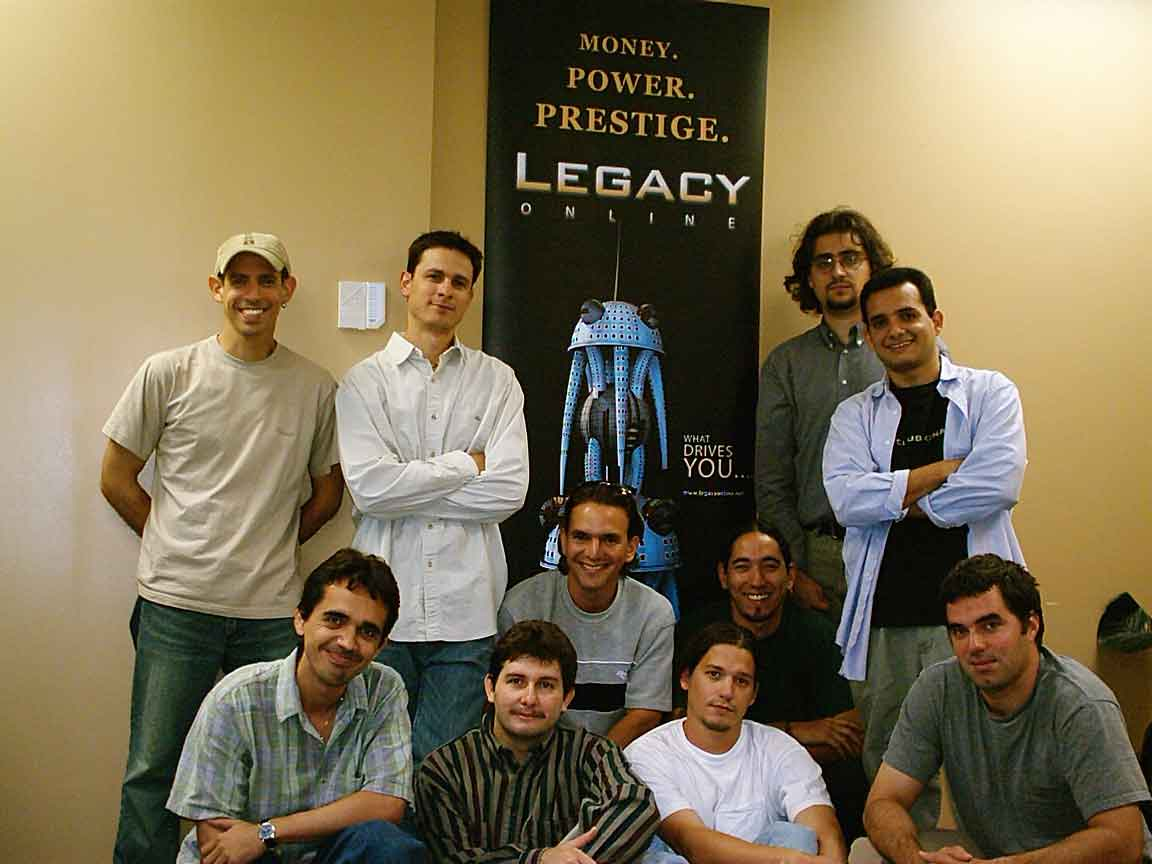
Members of the team in Ottawa during the release of Legacy Online (former StarPeace)
