= Big Biz Tycoon =

2002 video game

- Developer(s): Animedia
- Publisher(s): Activision Value
- Platform(s): Microsoft Windows
- Release: May 30, 2002 (US)
- Genre(s): Business simulation game
- Mode(s): Single-player

Big Biz Tycoon allows the player to try their hand in the business world. Similar to other business simulation games, the intent is for the player to become a mogul of an industry. It was developed for Microsoft Windows by Animedia, and published by Activision Value.

== Gameplay ==
=== Overview ===
The objective of the game is to create a successful business by developing products. As products are sold, the player earns money depending on the production rate and price of the product. This enables them to hire employees and decorate the office building. The products manufactured include game software, business software, military gear, medicine, clothing, toys, books, sports equipment, etc.

Hired workers are assigned to projects according to their abilities, and must develop and market a product. In addition, the owner of the business has the option to purchase a gift and offer it to one of the employees, which will improve one of their abilities.

Money can be saved in two methods: making deposits in the bank or purchasing stocks.

=== Missions ===
Unlike some business simulation games, the assigned missions do not follow a sequence. Players who succeed in a mission may continue playing in it freely.

| Mission | Task |
|---|---|
| 1 | Generate $300,000 in 5 years |
| 2 | Generate $1,000,000 in 3 years and 8 months |
| 3 | Make the company's fortune reach the no. 3 in ratings within 7 years. |
| 4 | Make the company's stock worth reach the no. 3 spot within a decade. |
| 5 | Pay back a loan of half-a-million dollars in 8 years. |

== Reception ==
On Metacritic, the game scored a 50 based on 4 reviews.

== See also ==
- Big Biz Tycoon 2
