= Dino Island =

2002 video game

- Developer: Monte Cristo
- Publishers: EU: Monte Cristo; NA: Strategy First
- Designers: Yanik Buttner, Jérôme Cukier, Nicolas Frémont
- Platform: Windows
- Release: FRA: May 22, 2002; UK: June 7, 2002; NA: September 26, 2002
- Genre: Business simulation
- Mode: Single-player

Dino Island is a 2002 PC business simulation video game developed and published by Monte Cristo. In the game, the player builds and manages a dinosaur theme park, and can also crossbreed various dinosaurs to create new ones. Dino Island received "generally unfavorable" reviews according to Metacritic.

== Gameplay ==
Dino Island is a theme park simulator. It is rendered in full 3D - players can rotate, pan and zoom at will. Dinosaurs, staff and visitors are fully animated. The game uses a typical point and click and menu interface. Set in a more or less near future, scientists have managed to recreate dinosaurs. In order to fund research, government has set up dinosaur-themed amusement parks that the player will manage.

=== Dinosaurs ===
In Dino Island, there are 20 natural dinosaur species, including Tyrannosaurus rex, Troodon, Giganotosaurus, Parasaurolophus, Iguanodon, Ankylosaurus, and Pachycephalosaurus. The dinosaurs are classified in 6 families: large carnivorous, armored quadrupeds, light bipeds, etc.

The player can crossbreed any two dinosaurs to create a new one. The resulting creature will be a genetic hybrid of its parents: it will inherit features from both of them, based on genetic dominance. Each dinosaur is made of many parts: legs, arms, head, etc. Each part of the resulting dinosaur will also be a mix between that of its parents. For instance, the mix of a Diplodocus and a Triceratops will have a head in between that of its parents. Mutations can also occur, either accidentally or, when the player masters the technology, voluntarily. Mutations include feathers, extra horns, weird scales, and the like.

=== Visitors ===
Visitors also come in several categories, which all have likes and dislikes. For instance, kids like cute dinosaurs but do not like big ones, hooligans like to see dinosaur fights from up close but do not like peaceful dinosaurs, pensioners like diverse dinosaurs but not too much action, etc.

Every item in the game, dinosaurs, attraction or park installation, radiates several attributes like comfort, fear or cuteness, which will attract or repel different visitor types. Visitors will move in the park according to their needs. For instance, if the player's park has many other older visitors, it is not a good idea to put a path to the shops next to the most violent dinosaurs, as they will hesitate to go that way.

=== Park management ===
The game also has a light park management aspect. The player can build facilities that sell stuff like restaurants, food stands, shops, attractions, parks, enclosures to put the dinosaurs in and has to build a farm to manage staff that will feed the dinosaurs, among other things. As this was not the focus of the game, there are very few options in that department, compared to other games in that category.

== Reception ==
Reception

Aggregate score
Aggregator	Score
Metacritic	42/100

Review scores
Publication	Score
4Players	69%
Computer Gaming World	2.5/5
GameZone	7.7/10
IGN	3.5/10
Jeuxvideo.com	14/20
Games Domain	20/100

Dino Island received a "generally unfavorable" reception according to Metacritic, based on seven reviews.
