= Miniconomy =

2002 online simulation game

- Website type: MMOG
- Available in: English, Dutch, Spanish, Danish, Portuguese, German, French, Brazilian Portuguese
- Owner: Trade Games International BV
- Creator: Wouter Leenards
- Website: www.miniconomy.com
- Commercial: Yes
- Registration: Required
- Launched: 1 January 2002
- Current status: Active
- Content license: Closed Source

Miniconomy (also called MC by players) is an online, browser based, economic and trade simulation game developed in the Netherlands. The game has over 141,000 registered players from 100 countries that can play the game in English, Spanish, Danish, Portuguese, German, French and Dutch. As of March 2016, 149 rounds have been completed.

Miniconomy is free to play, but a premium membership is available. This membership allows for the creation of Miniconomy Ventures (MV) with which harbors, banks, and garages can be built, enables the player to start a political party, and gives the player personal smilies and colors on the forums (ingame incorporated as clubs) as well as twice the length of posts in clubs and unlimited number of lots that may be owned.

== History ==
The idea for Miniconomy came in October 2001 when then computer science student Wouter Leenards started thinking about making a realistic trading simulation game. Together with his brother, Mark Leenards, he further developed the plan, and eventually created Miniconomy.

Supported by Mark and some friends, he developed the idea further. Mark, being a business administration student, focused on the economic aspects of the game, whereas Wouter did the programming. The result is a unique online game for everybody who is interested in trading, economics and games. The advantage of Miniconomy is that it can be played on your web browser, so with any internet connection; at home, in the office, at school or at a friend's house. The first public round of Miniconomy started on January 1, 2002.

The original idea, a game where economy is simulated, sprung from a combination of imagination and the strengths of other well known game concepts. In most games, however, trading and all its characteristics is not the key. In Miniconomy the trading is the key, and therefore has realistic situations. Monopolies, price fixing, shortage, threats, robbery and abuse of power occur.

The first rounds were beta testing where bugs were found and loopholes were used to create imbalance in the game. However, during this time, the game grew exponentially, reaching 2000 active players and 5000 activated accounts within the first four months. The fact that the game grew so quickly and that server costs were rising to facilitate the bandwidth for this increase in players, something needed to be thought of to make sure that the game wasn't making big losses. To do this, a Premium Member system was developed. The benefits of this were at this time: a daily salary, entry to the Casino, the ability to post smileys and use color codes on the forums, the ability to start political parties, and the ability to start companies that could build harbors and banks.

At this time the brothers were frequently approached to ponder a way to apply the game in the school system, and so the brothers applied for different grants that existed for funding the creation of education systems. It was not until they got the Digitale Pioneers grant, a temporary action program that is meant for innovative grass-root Internet initiatives. This fund gives financial and organizational support to small-scale grass root content communities that realize innovative projects in the public domain on the Internet, that they were able to make the Educational Manager, which allowed teachers to monitor the actions of students and give them the tools needed to accurately grade them.

In November 2005, Miniconomy decided to start actively targeting the international markets. To do this an international country was made inside the game where the official language was English and a complete translation of the game was made into English by a volunteer. The country has been growing, with besides a large number of Dutch players, also reaching 150 active players from the United States at the end of round 49 in January 2008.

As of today, Miniconomy has over 14,000 registered users from the US, just over 4,000 from the United Kingdom and a core of active Danish players, with over 500 registered accounts. The Dutch speaking community still is quite dominant in the statistics, with over 63,000 accounts registered from Belgium and the Netherlands. These figures handle registered accounts, not active accounts and that the actual number of active players per round averages around 1,000.

== General information ==
In Miniconomy, the player starts with 1000 I-Shell, (the Miniconomy currency) 100 liters of gasoline and 10 skill points, which can then be used to specialize in the production and sale of products. There is also a possibility to start a Miniconomy Corporation, an actual second, third, etc. business (only available when you are a PM member). A Premium Membership is only available by purchasing it via credits, a currency that can be purchased with real money.

Miniconomy has rounds which last three weeks, with one week breaks in between them allowing for new political positions to be chosen and for the implementation of new features by the Federals & Wouter (the actual game masters). Miniconomy also has special trading rounds 1–2 times a year were traders are given certain tasks or goals to achieve. An example of this is a round where the team with the most I-Shells wins.

=== Trading ===
The main part of Miniconomy is trading. Players can choose to trade in 29 products and can get their turnover from intercity trade, intracity trade, international trade, and exports and NPC Tourists. Players can build shops in their hometown, buy shops in other cities or countries, and can dress these up with (animated) banners, increase the marketing so that their shop is more prominent on one of the streets, and add discounts for certain customers. At the end of the round the trade rankings, based on the net worth of players, are used to appoint a winner.

=== Geographic distribution ===
The game was launched in the Netherlands, and was initially only available to Dutch players; Miniconomy has a large number of European players compared to those of other continents. The Netherlands, Belgium and the United States are the nations with the largest number of players, but just recently, player totals in North America have known a steady growth, with nearly 10,000 registered users and several hundred active every round.

== Game structure ==
Miniconomy consists of four countries (Virtua, Digitalie, Cyberie, and Ibisha) each have their own forms of government and structure and laws.

Players are expected to obey their countries local laws as well as international laws.

Each country may have their own court system, although some choose not to use a traditional court system. Appeals from National Courts or lawsuits against players of other countries are held in the International Court, which is the highest court of the Federation, and is led by a chair appointed by the High Council.

Leaders of countries may participate in the Federal Union, which serves as an organization for international discussions, including changing some international laws. This is the highest political organization of the Federation.

== Community ==
Miniconomy has a very strong and tight community. Although not all players are socially active, some activities do promote activity between players. The easiest way to sell products for example is through the buildup of network of frequent customers. Although most informal communication takes place via the chat and via WhatsApp, there are some other in-game forms of communication.

=== Clubs ===
Clubs are the internet forums in Miniconomy. Different sub forums are available after someone builds a club and the players joins it. All club owners are automatically administrator of the club, and have the ability to appoint three moderators. Politics and game announcements also take place through clubs, and it is the preferred way of communication in Miniconomy. The possibility of private clubs, protected by a password, also allow for political parties, newspaper publishers, and volunteers to chat within the game without having to resort to outside communication tools.

=== Newspapers ===
Miniconomy has one official newspaper, the Miniconomist, which publishes every week in Dutch. Besides this newspaper, there are also other newspapers, created by players themselves. All the newspapers can be found by going to the kiosk in Miniconomy.

=== Miniconomeetings ===
About once every 3–4 months there will be held a Miniconomeeting. Currently only Dutch and Belgian players organize these kind of meetings of which there have been a few dozen so far. The last meeting took place in Amsterdam on 27 December 2014 and had many attendees. On average about 10 to 20 players attend these meetings, coming from anywhere in the two countries.

=== Administrative staff and volunteers ===
There are several administrative and volunteer functions, these are:

- Federals, Wouter, Remco – These are the game masters and the development team of Miniconomy. The Federals are divided into four roles: Federal Manager, Federal Assistant, Federal Coordinator, Federal Researcher. Federals are appointed from the playerbase, the exacts are unknown but it is speculated the Federals decide whom to appoint in consultation with Wouter, the game's owner.
- Central Bureau of Investigation (CBI) agent – This is the anti-cheat team of Miniconomy. They check all financial transactions to make sure no one breaks the game rules. These agents are players appointed by the Federals and Wouter.
- Assistant – These are the administrators of the in-game chat. They also help new players with the game since they are easily recognizable on the chat. Assistants are appointed by Head Assistant in consolidation with the Federals.
- Editor – They are responsible for posting to the Newsfeed as well as adding tweets to Twitter. Some examples of requests would be announcements by a National Government. Editors are appointed by the Head Editor in consolidation with the Federals.
- Recruiter – Recruiters are part of a group of volunteers who seek to bring new players, keep new and old players alike by promoting the game by doing tasks.
- Expert – These volunteers each have an area of specialty for which players can request more information about.
- High Council – A group of six experienced players that work as an advisory team for the Federals, Wouter and the Federal Union. Five are appointed by the Federals in Consolidation with the Federals, while the sixth is the International Court Chair who is appointed by the High Council. The High Council is the highest judicature organization in the Federation.
- Federal Union - A group of eight players and a chairman/woman consisting of delegations of two players from each country of the Federation, this group can make changes to certain laws in the International lawbook and make suggestions and recommendations to the High Council and Federals. This is the highest political organization in the Federation.

== Miniconomy in the classroom ==
The educational changes make it possible to play Miniconomy with a group of players, like a class of students. The participants will play the regular game like all other players and since you cannot tell them from regular players, they will blend completely into the society itself. Student accounts however won't be allowed to partake in criminal activities such as shooting and stealing.

The group leader can follow his or her class almost with every move they make. To not lose oversight or control, teachers can therefore follow the activities of the students and help them on their way. The group leaders can also see the balance sheets and income statements of all students.

The group leader also gets a Miniconomy account, which he or she can use to take a look into the world of Miniconomy and even trade or compete with the students or the other players if they would like.

Minoconomy is primarily developed for students in middle school or higher, and especially for the subjects economics, management and organisation, and math. The game also lends itself well for aspects in the society for social studies.

=== Educational Manager ===
In 2005 the Educational Manager was created, which allows teachers to follow every step of their students' progress within the game. Twenty-six schools have participated since then, all of them being in the Netherlands except for Turner High School, which is in the United States. The age groups where Miniconomy matches the curriculum are between 12 and 20, due to the general developments that students get in the field of language, economics, communication, and politics.

== See also ==
- Cybernations
- eRepublik
