= Geniu$: The Tech Tycoon Game =

2005 video game

- Developer(s): Radon Labs
- Publisher(s): Viva Media
- Platform(s): Windows
- Release: EU: Nov 1, 2005; NA: Dec 31, 2008
- Genre(s): Business simulation
- Mode(s): Single-player

Geniu$: The Tech Tycoon Game (German: Genius Unternehmen Physik) is a business simulation game in which the player operates an industrial business, making products from bicycles to aircraft. New technologies are obtained through physics questions to be solved by the player, occurring at intervals mirroring real-world innovation.

There are two related games, Genius: Task Force Biology (German: Genius: Task Force Biologie) and Genius: Politics (German: Genius: Im Zentrum der Macht).

== Gameplay ==
To begin, the player chooses one of five cities of varying difficulty to play in: Pittsburgh, Detroit, Berlin, London, and Melbourne. The player starts with a single bicycle factory in 1850. At the start, the only available factory is the bicycle factory. New factories and other buildings can be obtained through research in the form of in-game puzzles and physics problems.

As time progresses, the player enlarges the empire by building new factories, mines, and worker housing. The addition of infrastructure such as water and electricity increases productivity. Later, worker amenities such as libraries and schools become available to raise employee morale.

The landscape is presented in 3/4 perspective. The landscape can be rotated up to 45° left and right from initial, for a total 90° motion.

=== Infrastructure ===
All buildings need to be connected together by roads so that workers can commute to work. Total demand for products can be increased through shipping, such as road and rail connections at the edge of the map and airports.

One of the earliest infrastructure upgrades is to supply buildings with water and fire coverage, increasing productivity and decreasing fire risk. This done through a pumping station placed at the edge of a body of water and water towers to transport it to distant areas, with fire stations placed within the water coverage. When electricity becomes available, the addition of that resource further increases productivity. Electricity is produced by a power plant and spread by transformer stations.

=== Factories ===
Typical industrial zone

There are nine factory types in game: bicycles, locomotives, optics, motorcycles, automobiles, trucks, airships, airplanes, and rockets.

=== Natural resources ===
The base natural resources involved in production are coal, iron, and rubber. Coal and iron can be mined, while rubber needs to be imported by ship. Coal and iron are mined from rock outcrops spread around the landscape. Coal and workers are required for all factories, though certain others also require steel and tires.

=== Workers ===
The player is responsible for providing housing to all of the company's employees. The base accommodation is a worker cottage, which can upgrade and eventually be a skyscraper given sufficient demand. The player is also tasked with setting the employee wage. Morale decreases with a decrease or stagnation of wage, leading to increased risk of strikes and financial losses.

== Characters ==
There are six characters seen throughout the game: Mr. Hoffman, George, Production Manager Cunningham, Mrs. Friedrichs, Assistant Mary Rogers, and Assistant Henry Wagner. They provide a face and voice for the various physics problems.

== Reception ==
Reviews for Geniu$: The Tech Tycoon Game were generally mixed to positive. Aggregator Metacritic gives the game an average of 63/100.

Allen Rausch at GameSpy rated Geniu$ at 3 out of 5 stars. For him, the game had a good premise but fell short on execution. He appreciated the attempt at mixing educational content, but was disappointed by the mathematical difficulty of some problems and the shallow gameplay.
