= American Dream: The Business Management Simulation =

1985 video game

- Publisher: Blue Chip Software
- Platform: MS-DOS
- Release: 1985
- Genre: Business simulation game

American Dream: The Business Management Simulation (also known as Managing for Success) is a 1985 video game published by Blue Chip Software.

== Overview ==
American Dream: The Business Management Simulation is a game in which the player is a chief executive officer for a company that manufactures robots. Unlike previous Blue Chip games, American Dream was designed to train people for managerial roles in business and was targeted at the corporate audience, with a retail price of $124.95.

== Reception ==
Steve Estvanik reviewed the game for Computer Gaming World, and stated that "it is an outstanding training tool, especially for data processors and line managers for whom the program can give insight into the broader aspects of businesses in which they work. If you can afford the ticket price you are in for an enjoyable and educational time when you "play" American Dream."

The game received a positive review in Family Computing as well, with Robin Raskin praising the game for being accessible to people without a business background. 80 Micro described the game as having educational merit, praising the user interface and the depth of the simulation. A review in PC Magazine said that much of the game's depth was "window dressing" and described the gameplay as being too repetitive for repeated playthroughs.

== See also ==
- Squire: The Financial Planning Simulation
