= Greenheart Games =

Video Game developer

- Industry: Video game industry
- Founded: July 2012; 14 years ago
- Founders: Patrick Klug; Daniel Klug
- Headquarters: Indooroopilly
- Area served: Worldwide
- Products: Game Dev Tycoon
- Website: www.greenheartgames.com

Greenheart Games is an Australian independent video game developer founded in July 2012 by brothers Patrick and Daniel Klug. Game Dev Tycoon and Tavern Keeper, both business simulation games, are its only released games.

The headquarters are in Brisbane, Australia but is served online with developers from many countries.

== Products ==
A year after the release of their first game, Game Dev Tycoon, Greenheart Games laid plans for their second game, Tavern Keeper, which is currently set for release in 2025.

Tavern Keeper had a limited time demo available in 2024. The game has been under development since 2014, and is a humorous fantasy tavern simulator. This second game has been known under the name 'Game #2', and the project was kept from the public until 23 November 2016, when its announcement was sent by e-mail to subscribers of Greenheart Games' newsletter.

Year	Game	Platform	Reception	Notes
2012	Game Dev Tycoon	Microsoft Windows, Windows RT, Mac OS X, Linux, IOS, Android, Nintendo Switch	95/100% (Steam); 68/100 (Metacritic); 67.70% (Gamerankings)	
2025	Tavern Keeper	Microsoft Windows	95% (Steam)	Currently in Early Access

== Public announcements ==
The team had been silent about the development of Tavern Keeper, but in April 2019, Greenheart Games created a Patreon page. People could buy a subscription to get behind the scenes insight on the development of Tavern Keeper. They have since hosted 40 podcasts with various members of the team sharing their experiences, struggles and successes while creating the game. One day prior to the 10th anniversary of Game Dev Tycoon, the team released the Steam page for Tavern Keeper. Tavern Keeper officially launched into Steam Early Access on 4 November, 2025.
