= Zapitalism =

1997 business simulation video game

- Developer: LavaMind
- Publisher: Ionos
- Designer: Steven Hoffman
- Platform: Windows
- Release: 1996
- Genre: Business simulation game
- Modes: Single-player, multiplayer

Zapitalism is a business simulation game for Windows released in 1996. It was designed by Steven Hoffman, developed by LavaMind and published by Ionos.

== Gameplay ==
The player first has a budget of 50,000 zables (a unit of in-game money), less zables in harder levels, and must build a small store into a large enterprise. There are 6 players and at least one has to be a human player. Each company that each player can choose has a unique advantage, such as Hoffmani Emporium which offers free travel. The player can control the business and do things such as loaning, buying products, paying workers their salaries, and betting for many things. The player may also buy advertising and buy insurances. The first player to win a certain amount of zables wins a round, and the first player to win 10 billion zables wins the game.

A player expands their store only if they own building permits. If a building permit is paid to the building that gives out store constructions then the construction can finish within a certain number of weeks depending on the size of the building and the workers themselves.

The player may have to face things such as taxes, giving salary to the workers, natural disasters, vandalism, and many others. Insurance can be used to help protect the player against most disasters but only disasters in-between turns. This can help refund paying for the disasters and thus avoid more chances of being unlucky (and being more vulnerable to disasters).

== Reception ==
Reception

Review scores
Publication	Score
Computer Games Magazine	3/5
PC Gamer	60%

== Legacy ==
In 2010, a renewed version was made accessible via the Internet. It was awarded the Verizon Powerful Answers Award for financial literacy in 2014.
