= Casino, Inc. =

2003 business simulation video game

- Developer: Hothouse Creations
- Publisher: Konami
- Platform: Windows
- Release: NA: March 26, 2003; EU: April 11, 2003
- Genre: Business simulation game
- Mode: Single player

Casino, Inc. is a business simulation game for Windows. The player must construct a casino, fill it with attractions such as blackjack and poker tables, and hire staff to maintain the casino.

The game was released on Steam by Alternative Software.

== Gameplay ==
The player begins by choosing a casino. Then the player chooses one of three cities: Little Hope Springs (Easy), Fortune Falls (Medium), or Chancersville (Hard). The player starts with $20,000 (Little Hope Springs), $50,000 (Fortune Falls), or $35,000 (Chancersville) to set up their casino and is given a variety of objectives to meet. Facilities and upgrades can be purchased, such as bars, kitchens, hotel floors, dance floors, table games and slots. Staff available for hire include hitmen, guards, dealers and hosts. Services for guests can be purchased such as limousines and shuttles. Players can also buy advertisements and must work against competitors who are trying to lure away patrons.

== Expansion pack ==
An expansion pack called Casino Inc The Management was released, adding more casino styles, cities, objects and abilities for your hitmen (bombs) and troublemakers.
