= Tabloid Tycoon =

2005 video game

- Developer: Black Lantern Studios
- Publishers: NA: ValuSoft; EU: Global Software Publishing
- Platform: Microsoft Windows
- Release: NA: April 25, 2005; PAL: March 3, 2006
- Genre: Business simulation

Tabloid Tycoon is a 2005 business simulation game. The player manages a scandalous tabloid newspaper. Gameplay includes sabotaging rivals, settling lawsuits, employing paparazzi, and photographing scandals.
