= Trailer Park Tycoon =

2002 video game

- Developer(s): Jaleco Entertainment
- Publisher(s): Jaleco Entertainment
- Designer(s): Chris Cao
- Platform(s): Windows
- Release: NA: November 24, 2002
- Genre(s): Business simulation game
- Mode(s): Single-player

Trailer Park Tycoon is a business simulation game for Windows.

== Gameplay ==
Trailer Park Tycoon puts the player in the shoes of a budding trailer park owner.

The player is tasked with building various trailers and amenities to attract people to their park. They will start with five to eight basic trailers, each upgradable three times. Specialized trailers become available, catering to specific people. A trailer in the theme of a car, for example, will attract garage workers, while a biker themed trailer will attract bikers.

== Reception ==
Reception

Aggregate score
Aggregator	Score
GameRankings	55.67%

Review score
Publication	Score
IGN	5.0/10

Reviews for the game had mostly been mixed, with the game currently holding an average score of 55.67% on GameRankings.
