= StarPeace =

2000 video game

- Developer: Oceanus Communications
- Publishers: Monte Cristo Multimedia (2000 launch); Oceanus Communications (2001 launch); Sega (2003 launch); Pugland (2005 launch); SPO Team (2008 launch)
- Designer: Miguel Cepero
- Platform: Windows
- Release: December, 2000 (EU); March, 2001 Worldwide; June 16, 2003 as Legacy Online
- Genres: MMORTS, City-building game
- Mode: Multiplayer

StarPeace is an open-ended online city-building computer game, in which thousands of players build and develop a large inhabitable world. Similar in many ways to SimCity 4, one major difference being StarPeace is fully online, and players compete against each other to build industrial, residential, retail markets, and more on a single planet, making sure to gain a steady income in which to fund their future expansion. Similar to other Sim games, there is no definite end. The planet continues to grow in a continuously evolving state as each player adds more buildings to it. Each player can choose between a large selection of planets on which to play.

== History ==
The game was developed by Oceanus Communications, and originally published and released by Monte Cristo Multimedia in 2000. Despite good reviews and a dedicated fan community, it turned out to be a commercial disaster. While Monte Cristo managed to sell 50,000 copies to its distributors, less than a thousand games were sold to final customers in Europe. Additionally, the complex economic nature of the game required much higher server power per user than MMORPGs. Monte Cristo's investors believed in the potential of MMOs; therefore, the company prepared the infrastructure to welcome tens of thousands of users. Monte Cristo needed 20,000 users just to cover its hosting costs, but one month after the launch, it had just over 500 subscribers. It then tried to disengage from its relationship with Oceanus, which, incidentally, never agreed to the expensive hosting and e-commerce strategy. In March 2001, the two came to an agreement: Oceanus kept the rights to the game and would host it themselves for one year. Eventually, the developers at Oceanus showed the game at E3 2002 hoping to gain a new publisher. They caught the eye of video game giant Sega, which quickly became very interested in the game.

By late 2002, Sega became the game's new official publisher, and also took over development of the game. They changed the name of the game to "Legacy Online", and re-released it as a free-to-download subscription-based game. Players no longer needed to buy the game, but a subscription of $10 per month was required. There were quite a lot of problems with Sega's administration of the game, with users often complaining about login issues, server issues, or other such incidents on the new client and updates. It seems Sega themselves were having a lot of problems managing the game on their own servers, and making the necessary changes to the client. In 2003, the game (and the website, and server access) shut down.

After a year, in April 2004, three fans approached Oceanus Communications (the original developer and owner) asking for permission to rerelease StarPeace. The revival was short-lived.

== Sequel ==
StarPeace 2 is heavily based on the original StarPeace game, with the major difference being that the building and product types have been split up.

== Community versions ==
An open-source community-supported version was founded in May 2018. This version, named STARPEACE, is being created from the ground-up and is under active development as of December 2023.

== Reception ==
Several online sources reviewed Starpeace favorably but also indicated that it was a complex game and a large learning curve.
