= Youtubers Life =

2017 video game

- Logo of the game
- Developer: U-Play online
- Publishers: U-Play online and Raiser Games
- Director: Quim Garrigós
- Producer: Samuel Asín
- Designers: Joel Servitja; Ignacio Castanera; Quim Garrigós
- Programmer: Alex Cabrera
- Artist: David López
- Composer: Aurélie Raoût
- Platforms: Windows, Mac, Android OS, Linux, IOS, PlayStation 4, Xbox One, Nintendo Switch
- Release: WW: 2 February 2017
- Genres: Life simulation, business simulation
- Mode: Single-player

Youtubers Life is a life and business simulation video game in development by Spain-based independent company U-Play online. The game was released into Steam Early Access in May 2016.

== Gameplay ==
Youtubers Life is a life simulation game with business simulation elements, and influences from the Game Dev Tycoon and The Sims video games. The player has to manage a character trying to build a career as a YouTube personality. In addition to managing the creation of videos for their channel, the player must also manage the character's education and social life. As the character develops, the player also must manage the character's employees and growing content network. Opportunities to create videos for friends, creating videos through advertising agreements, and the revenue generated by each video's ads enable the character to purchase upgrades to their equipment and housing, and access resources to level up their character's skills.

== Development ==
Youtubers Life was developed by U-Play online, an independent entertainment company based in Barcelona, Spain. The game was greenlit through Steam Greenlight in 2015, and released into Steam Early Access, for Microsoft Windows and OS X, on 18 May 2016.

In November 2018, Youtubers Life OMG! Edition was released on the Nintendo Switch, PlayStation 4, and Xbox One.

The game's sequel, Youtubers Life 2, was announced on 2021 and released on 19 October of the same year.

== Reception ==
The PC version of Youtubers Life received "mixed or average" reviews from critics, according to the review aggregation website Metacritic.
