= Game Tycoon =

2006 video game

- Developer(s): Beat Games
- Publisher(s): Tri Synergy
- Platform(s): Windows
- Release: NA: March 22, 2006
- Genre(s): Business simulation game
- Mode(s): Single-player

Game Tycoon is a business simulation game focused on production of video games. The game has been largely ridiculed, especially for some parts not translated from German to English.

== Gameplay ==
Game play is centered on the full production of video-game making; from production of an engine, concept design, physical design, packaging, licensing deals, market campaigns, and reviews.

The game starts off in 1982 with somewhat limited availability of features. Eventually, more options are made for engines and packaging, etc.
