= Wildlife Park =

2003 video game

- Developer: B-Alive GmbH
- Publishers: Deep Silver; JoWood Productions; Encore Software Inc.
- Platform: Microsoft Windows
- Release: FRA: September 26, 2003; NA: November 13, 2003
- Genre: Construction and management sim
- Mode: Single-player

Wildlife Park is a construction and management simulation game released in 2003. Like Zoo Tycoon and Zoo Empire, the game involves players in building a wildlife park or zoo. The game spawned two sequels, which are simply named Wildlife Park 2 and Wildlife Park 3.

== Reception ==
Reception

Aggregate score
Aggregator	Score
Metacritic	62/100

The game received "mixed or average" reviews, according to video game review score aggregator Metacritic.
