= NIMBY Rails =

Transport simulation game

- Developer: Carlos Carrasco
- Platforms: Linux; Microsoft Windows
- Release: 26 January 2021; 5 years ago (Early access)
- Genre: Railway simulation
- Modes: Single-player, Multi-player

NIMBY Rails is a railway simulation game developed by Carlos Carrasco. The game involves developing a railway network on an in-game map based on the real world. It was released as an early access game in 2021.

== Gameplay ==
NIMBY Rails is entirely set on an OpenStreetMap-based map of the whole world, without computer-generated maps or levels. The game map starts out empty, without any preexisting trains or buildings, and the player builds railway track and stations with little restriction save for existing roads and bodies of water. Similarly, despite being the game's namesake, NIMBYs are not currently featured in-game. Players can choose to play with money implemented, or disable it and build without funding restrictions. The game includes a simplistic passenger demand system and time zones, with fluctuations in passenger count based on the in-game time. Gameplay includes not only building railway lines and tracks, but also purchasing trains and rolling stock, and scheduling services. A multiplayer mode is available, allowing multiple players to build in the same game map. As of 2023, the game does not include any sounds or music.

== Development ==
NIMBY Rails is developed by Barcelona-based developer Carlos Carrasco, who was inspired to develop the game after playing the transport simulation game OpenTTD. According to Carrasco, NIMBY Rails began development in late 2018. In order to keep the game's filesize under 20 GB while including the whole world map, Carrasco opted to remove building layers from OSM data and reduced the map's resolution before adding topographical and land use data from NASA and ESA, and an early version of the game was publicly revealed in mid-March 2020, and was released as an early access game on Steam on 26 January 2021. Carrasco stated that he came up with the title NIMBY Rails as 'clickbait'.

== Reception ==
Aaron Gordon of VICE called the game "possibly the most complicated transit-development game ever devised". In his review, Gordon mentioned how while the game appears boring to viewers, it "feeds the ultimate YIMBY fantasy". Rock Paper Shotgun's review praised the premise of the game allowing for free building on a real-world map and the simple, easy-to-learn gameplay, while noting deficiencies in the game's controls and text interface.

== See also ==
- Subway Builder, another transit simulation game
