= Oil Barons =

1983 video game

- Developer: Epyx
- Publisher: Epyx
- Designer: Tom Glass
- Platforms: Apple II, Commodore 64, MS-DOS
- Release: 1983
- Genre: Business simulation
- Modes: Single-player, multiplayer

Oil Barons is a turn-based business simulation game published by Epyx in 1983 for Apple II, Commodore 64, and MS-DOS compatible operating systems. It fuses a video game and a board game via a 50 X 40 square grid game board and tokens to associate different squares to various terrain-specific video game locations.

Commodore 64 screenshot

== Reception ==
Oil Barons received mixed reviews and was awarded a Certificate of Merit in the category of "1984 Best Multi-Player Video Game/Computer Game" at the fifth annual Arkie Awards.

Ahoy! criticized the pace of the game, noting that each player had to "sit at the computer for several minutes. Other players can use this time to strategize, but things can get pretty slow. Oil Barons, for all its complexity, may not keep you entertained while you are waiting."
