= Monte Cristo (company) =

French video game publisher and developer (1995–2010)

- Industry: Video games
- Founded: 1995
- Founders: Jean-Marc de Fety; Jean-Cristophe Marquis
- Defunct: 2010
- Fate: Bankruptcy
- Headquarters: Paris, France
- Revenue: 1,000,000 (2009)
- Net income: −2,820,000 (2009)

Monte Cristo was a French computer game developer and publisher, based in Paris. It was established in 1995 by former Credit Suisse First Boston vice-president Jean-Marc de Fety and former Mars & Co strategy senior consultant Jean-Cristophe Marquis. The company was led by Jean-Christophe Marquis and Jérome Gastaldi since 2002. Monte Cristo declared bankruptcy in May 2010 following poor sales of Cities XL.

The first training program was followed by Wall Street Trader, which was named "best educational software" by the European Commission, among others, for its accurate simulation of international stock market conditions, and is one of the most successful games in this genre. Next, the company developed Start Up 2000, which allows players to realistically start and run their own business.

== Games developed and published ==
Title	Year
Airline Tycoon	1998
Wall Street Trader 98	1998
Wall Street Trader 99	1999
Wall Street Trader 2000	2000
Start - Up	2000
Starpeace , published by Oceanus Communications	2000
Stardom: Your Quest For Fame, also known as TV Star	2000
TV Star	2001
Wall Street Trader 2001	2001
Crazy Factory	2001
Economic War	2001
Casino Tycoon	2001
Dino Island	2002
Platoon	2002
Micro Commandos	2002
Emergency Fire Response (aka Fire Department in Europe and Fire Chief in UK)	2003
Medieval Lords : Build, Defend, Expand	2004
Desert Rats vs.Afrika Korps	2004
D - Day	2004
Fire Department 2 (aka Fire Captain)	2004
Pop Life	2005
Moscow to Berlin : Red Siege	2005
City Trader	2005
7 Sins	2005
1944 Battle of the Bulge	2005
Fire Department : Episode 3	2006
Th3 Plan	2006
War on Terror	2006
City Life , published by cdv Software Entertainment	2006
KAZooK, published by Xplosiv	2007
Silverfall	2007
Cities XL , originally known as Cities Unlimited	2009
