= Aerobiz =

1992 video game

- North American Super NES cover art
- Developer: Koei
- Publisher: Koei
- Composer: Taku Iwasaki
- Series: Koei Executive Series
- Platforms: FM Towns, NEC PC-9801, Super NES, Genesis, X68000
- Release: Super NES: JP: April 5, 1992; NA: February 1993; Genesis: JP: November 1, 1992; NA: April 1993; X68000: JP: November 20, 1992
- Genre: Business simulation
- Modes: Single-player, multiplayer

Aerobiz (Note: Aerobiz (エアーマネジメント 大空に賭ける; lit. "Air Management: Ōzora ni Kakeru")) is a business simulation video game for the Super NES and Mega Drive/Genesis game consoles, released in 1992 by Koei. It was also released for the FM Towns, PC-9801 and X68000 computer platforms in Japan.

As CEO of a budding international airline, the player has a limited amount of time to expand their business to become the industry leader against three other airlines (either AI-controlled or human opponents). The player has an amount of control over how their airline develops, such as the name, investments, what routes to fly, plane purchases, and other various aspects, while at the mercy of world events such as politics (for instance, choosing to run an airline out of Moscow will restrict the player to buying only Soviet planes, and will make negotiating with Western nations more difficult) and natural disasters. The player can also get the company involved in peripheral businesses such as hotels and shuttle services. Once Perestroika is initiated, then the Cold War restrictions no longer apply in the game.

The sequel Aerobiz Supersonic was released in August 1994 for the SNES and Mega Drive/Genesis. The player is presented with a wider variety of options in nearly everything. Another sequel/remake known as Air Management '96 was released only in Japan for the Sega Saturn, PlayStation and Microsoft Windows.

== Gameplay ==
Aerobiz features two timeframes to play the game through: 1963 to 1995, and 1983 to 2015. After selecting the timeframe, the players then choose a city for their airline's headquarters. This allows a certain amount of handicapping: some cities, such as New York, London, and Tokyo, start the player with many airplanes and a large amount of money; others, such as Lima, Nairobi, and Honolulu, start the player with only a couple of airplanes and a small amount of money. The players then select a difficulty level, which affects the number of passengers, world events (and the reactions of the passengers to those world events), and the win conditions. A charter system of independent airlines can have their shares bought or sold on the stock market; owning at least 51% of the company makes it eligible to be assimilated into the main airline.

The gameplay is superficially straightforward: players negotiate for access slots at each airport, buy airplanes, then open routes and start business. After each player has made their desired moves, the game shows any world events that affect the players (for instance, a labor strike will delay shipments of aircraft from that company, while the Olympic Games will boost traffic worldwide, particularly to the host city). The game then shows the results of direct competition between airlines flying the same routes, then the quarterly results of sales, expenses, profits, and passengers flown. After the January–March quarter of every year, it also shows annual results. There are elements of enhancing airline service, such as improving the convenience of arrivals/departures, along with reductions in fare, improving the quality of service along with advertising campaigns.

The game is won by the first player to achieve the win conditions: link all 22 cities and carry a certain number of passengers (between 2.5 million and 4.5 million, based on difficulty level), all while remaining profitable. If a player goes for four quarters with a negative balance, the company is declared bankrupt and offered reorganization. If the game goes for 32 years (128 turns) without any player meeting the win conditions, the game is called a loss.

=== Scenarios ===
Scenario 1
This scenario starts in 1963 with the intense competition for the airlines heating up with aircraft that can fly for longer distances without re-fueling. All airlines are desperately trying to cross the long Pacific Ocean in the quest for intercontinental superiority.
Scenario 2
This scenario starts in 1983 with the supersonic airplane becoming the hottest topic in the airline industry.

== Reception ==
Reception

Aggregate score
Aggregator	Score
GameRankings	67.75% (SNES)

Review score
Publication	Score
MegaTech	90%

Award
Publication	Award
MegaTech	Hyper Game

MegaTech magazine said the game had massive potential, and that "strategy buffs will cream over it". Super Gamer reviewed the SNES version and gave an overall score of 81% writing: "This puts you in charge of an airline, buying aircraft, routes, hotels, advertising, and even choosing whether to skimp on repairs!"

== Remake ==
Air Management '96
- Developer: Koei
- Publisher: Koei
- Series: Koei Executive Series
- Platforms: Sony PlayStation, Sega Saturn, Microsoft Windows (Windows 95 through Windows XP)
- Release: PlayStation: JP: March 22, 1996; Sega Saturn: JP: March 22, 1996
- Genre: Business simulation game
- Modes: Single-player, multiplayer

A sequel/remake of this game was made for the Sony PlayStation, Sega Saturn, and Windows PC called Air Management '96 (Note: Air Management '96 (エアーマネジメント'96)). Graphics have been enhanced in this version, but it is only available in Japanese.

== See also ==
- Aerobiz Supersonic
