= Airport Tycoon =

2000 video game

- Cover art
- Developer: Krisalis Software
- Publishers: TalonSoft; Global Star Software
- Engine: RenderWare
- Platform: Windows
- Release: NA: April 25, 2000
- Genre: Business simulation game
- Mode: Single-player

Airport Tycoon is a business simulation game released for Windows 95/98 in 2000. It was developed in the United Kingdom by Krisalis Software (now defunct). In Airport Tycoon, the player must successfully build and manage an airport without going bankrupt. There have been two sequels created for Airport Tycoon: Airport Tycoon 2 and Airport Tycoon 3. There was to be a Nintendo 64 version released as well, but this version was cancelled for unknown reasons.

== History ==
Airport Tycoon was originally called Airport Inc. and Air Mogul. A week before the game's publishing, Krisalis Software changed its name to Airport Tycoon in some markets, a more catchy title, but the game calls itself Air Mogul because of the inadequate time to change the software, and is sold in PAL as Airport Inc. Krisalis became defunct shortly after publishing Airport Tycoon.

== Gameplay ==
Similar to other games of this type, players take on the role of an airport manager. They first select a location for their airport from several cities around the world. Players then construct a terminal for their passengers, followed by runways, tarmac, control towers and support services.

The player then attracts business to their airport by signing contracts with vendors in the terminal and contracting flights into and out of the airport. Players also manage the airport's budget, which cannot operate at too much of a loss. Players can operate passenger airports and cargo airports with different considerations for each.

A number of preset scenarios are also available to the player, including the conversion of a major cargo airport to a passenger airport in Beijing.

== Development ==
Telstar secured worldwide publishing rights to the game in May 1998.

== Reception ==
The game was poorly received by critics. Frequent criticisms included difficulty of gameplay, substandard graphics and confusing controls. It received a 62/100 score from PC Gamer, and 3/10 from IGN, among other rankings.

== Sequels ==
Airport Tycoon was followed by a sequel, Airport Tycoon 2, in early 2003. It was developed by Sunstorm Interactive and published by Global Star Software on February 26, 2003 for Windows PC. Airport Tycoon 2 received negative reviews from critics. Aggregating review website GameRankings provides an average score of 31% based on 9 reviews, whereas Metacritic provides a score of 32 out of 100 based on 6 reviews, indicating "generally unfavorable reviews".

A third game in the series, Airport Tycoon 3, was developed by InterActive Vision and published by Global Star on October 30, 2003. Based on four professional reviews, Metacritic finds that Airport Tycoon 3 has received "generally unfavorable" reviews and establishes a metascore of 46/100. Airport Tycoon received negative reviews by IGN and GameSpot calling the game "irritating and monotonous", and the general review of the game on both the sites stated that the game was "lackluster" and "bland" not only in gameplay but in sound and texture, and its mechanics were "tedious". GameSpot said that the game was disappointing in several aspects.
