= Freight Tycoon =

2006 video game

- Developer(s): Nikita
- Publisher(s): 1C Company
- Platform(s): Windows
- Release: 2006 (EU)
- Genre(s): Strategy, simulation
- Mode(s): Single-player

Freight Tycoon is a simulation strategy computer game focused around transporting goods via small and large tonnage trucks. The game was published by the Russian 1C Company.
