= Airline Tycoon =

1998 business simulation game

- Developer: Spellbound Entertainment
- Publishers: Infogrames Deutschland; First Class and Evolution releases Monte Cristo; Deluxe (Windows); Spellbound Entertainment; Deluxe (other platforms); RuneSoft
- Designer: Armin Gessert
- Platforms: Windows, Mac OS X, MorphOS, Linux, ZETA, iOS, Android
- Release: Original: August 1998; First Class: January 22, 2001; Evolution: September 17, 2002; Deluxe: October 5, 2003
- Genre: Business simulation game
- Modes: Single-player, multiplayer

Airline Tycoon is a business simulation game by Thomas Holz and Robert Kleinert, in which the player must successfully manage an airline. The original was developed by Spellbound Entertainment, and published by Infogrames Deutschland, but the succeeding versions were published by a variety of publishers.

The original Airline Tycoon was created for Windows, but the later Deluxe version was also ported to Linux, Mac OS X, MorphOS, ZETA, iOS and Android.

Like other "tycoon" computer games, the objective of the game is to become a tycoon, and in this case, an "Airline Tycoon". This is achieved through the balance of income and expenditures.

== Gameplay ==
Airline Tycoon is a simulation game where the player acts as manager of an airline, competing against three other tycoons. The names of the four tycoons are: Tina Cortez (Sunshine Airways), Siggi Sorglos (Falcon Lines), Igor Tuppolevsky (Phoenix Travel) and Mario Zucchero (Honey Airlines).

The player must keep their aircraft in good shape and equip them at such a level as to keep the customers satisfied, buy new planes (from the expensive Airplane Agency or from Mr. Schlauberger at the museum who sells old planes at a much lower cost) and take out bank loans if required.

The player must also manage their personnel, plan flights, buy fuel, attend meetings in the airport manager's office and, if there is the time, slip into Rick's café for a quick cup of coffee. The player can also perform sabotage on the other players.

The graphics are bright and decidedly tongue in cheek: the tycoon Igor Tuppolevsky has a set of Russian dolls on his desk—and an open tin of caviar, while Tina Cortez has a picture of a matador and a bull's head.

With a network, up to four people can play at once and the game status can be saved (as it can in single-player mode) for longer games.

== History ==
Release timeline
1998	Airline Tycoon
1999
2000
2001	Airline Tycoon First Class
2002	Airline Tycoon Evolution
2003	Airline Tycoon Deluxe
2004
2005	Airline Tycoon Deluxe (Linux and MacOS release)
2006
2007
2008
2009
2010
2011	Airline Tycoon Deluxe (Mac App Store release)
2011	Airline Tycoon 2
2012
2013
2014
2015	Airline Tycoon Deluxe (gog.com release with source code)

=== Releases ===
The original game, under the title Airline Tycoon, was released in August 1998 in Germany by Infogrames Deutschland. It was not translated to English, as no publisher released it in any English-speaking country, but an official English demo was made available both on-line and on magazine covermounts. Outside of Germany, the game had its release in Poland on September 11, 1999. Also in 1999 a standalone add-on named Airline Tycoon First Class was released in Germany (initially available only in German).

In 2001, two years after its German release (and three years after the series' inception), Airline Tycoon First Class was the first installment to be released in English by Monte Cristo. As it was the first game in the series to be released in the United States and the United Kingdom, the publisher decided to remove First Class subtitle from the game box and manuals, though it remained in-game. Features added in First Class include ten brand new missions, multiplayer mode with up to 4 players, new MIDI music, cargo transportation and more.

In 2002, Airline Tycoon Evolution, second Airline Tycoon re-release was published by Monte Cristo. The game introduced ten new missions, possibility of buying self-designed aircraft (and possibility of sharing these planes via Internet), possibility of hiring aircraft security agents, five new sabotages and more.

In 2003, Spellbound Entertainment released a third Airline Tycoon addition, named Airline Tycoon Deluxe. It included all of previous versions, the only new part of the game was twenty new airports and possibility of accepting cargo from remote estates. Originally it was released in limited edition of 5000 items. It was available only in Germany, though it was not translated into other languages. Linux, Mac OS X and ZETA versions released in Autumn 2005 and Winter 2006 by RuneSoft are available in English, German and French.

Airline Tycoon Deluxe was re-released on the digital distribution platform gog.com, including the source code in March 2015. The game uses a "source available" model, i.e. the source code is available for "non commercial purposes" only, and is not under an open source license.

=== Airline Tycoon 2 ===
Spellbound developed a full sequel to the original game, titled Airline Tycoon 2. Published by Kalypso Media, the game was released in October 2011. Two DLCs were released in 2012. The first one, titled Honey Airlines DLC, released on April 19, features a new character, new airline company, two additional campaign missions and a Cargo area for the airport. The second one, titled Falcon Lines DLC, released on June 14, adds another character and airline company, another two additional campaign missions, the Last-Minute Counter as a new airport area and the ability to open branch offices anywhere throughout the world.

== Reception ==
Sales of Airline Tycoon surpassed 150,000 units worldwide by 2001.

In 2001 an IGN review gave Airline Tycoon a good rating with 7.9/10. Airline Tycoon 2 received on Metacritic a mediocre score of 57/100 from four reviews.
