= Millionaire: The Stock Market Simulation =

1982 video game

- Publisher: Blue Chip Software
- Platforms: Apple II, Atari 8-bit, Commodore 64, MS-DOS, Mac
- Release: 1982
- Genre: Business simulation

Millionaire: The Stock Market Simulation is a business simulation video game published by Blue Chip Software in 1982.

== Gameplay ==
The player goes through 77 weeks and can buy and sell fifteen different stocks available from five industry groups.

== Reception ==
Johnny L. Wilson reviewed the game for Computer Gaming World, and stated that "Millionaire is a stimulating experience for anyone who enjoys the strategic decisions inherent in high finance."

Jerry Pournelle named Millionaire his game of the month for September 1984, stating that "if you've any interest at all in investments, you can learn a lot from this one—and it's fun".

Electronic Games awarded Millionaire the 1985 Arkie Awards for "Best Electronic Money Game".

Davis Foulger for PC Magazine reviewed it in December 1982, considering it to be enjoyable by people who actually use the stock market.
