= Holiday Island (video game) =

1996 strategy video game

- Developer: Sunflowers Interactive Entertainment Software
- Publisher: Sunflowers Interactive Entertainment Software
- Platform: PC
- Release: 1996
- Genre: Strategy
- Mode: Single-player

Holiday Island is a business simulation video game developed by German game design company Sunflowers. Most of the gameplay involves juggling funds to build hotels, accommodation, leisure activities and restaurants. The number and location of these is important, as is the interconnectivity between different facilities. There are also other people like the player constructing and starting businesses in the island. The player can hire a Mafia style hitman to ruin other people's businesses.
