= Make Millions =

1984 video game

- Developer: Tom Snyder Productions
- Publisher: Scarborough Systems
- Platform: Macintosh
- Release: 1984
- Genre: Business simulation
- Mode: Single-player

Make Millions is a business simulation game developed by Tom Snyder Productions and released for the Macintosh in 1984.

== Gameplay ==
As the box art tells you, "The fast paced business strategy game that dares you to face the challenge of building a successful conglomerate. Test your entrepreneurial skills through "boom and bust". . . and learn a lot about the realities of business economics.". You are placed in the management position of your business, and have to manage the day to day operations, from Supplies to Staff to Sales.

== Campaign ==
Make Millions basically has you improving on your business skills until you defeat all other competition, either you defeat them all, or they defeat you.

== Marketing and release ==
Make Millions was ready for sale on store shelves in 1984.

== Legacy ==
Make Millions is still available at the Macintosh Repository under Make Millions.

== Reception ==
Gregg Williams reviewed the game for Computer Gaming World, and stated that "this is the most creative (and, at the same time, faithful in spirit to real life) business simulation I've ever seen on a computer. If you like business simulations, you're certain to enjoy MM."
