= Game Dev Tycoon =

2012 video game

- Developer: Greenheart Games
- Publisher: Greenheart Games
- Designers: Patrick Klug; Daniel Klug
- Composers: Alexander Lisenkov; Jack White
- Engine: NW.js (PC); Unity (iOS, Android)
- Platforms: Windows, Windows RT, macOS, Linux, iOS, AndroidNintendo Switch
- Release: WW: 10 December 2012; Switch: 8 October 2020
- Genre: Business simulation
- Mode: Single-player

Game Dev Tycoon is a 2012 business simulation video game developed by Greenheart Games released on 10 December 2012. The player creates and develops video games. Game Dev Tycoon was inspired by the iOS and Android game Game Dev Story (by Kairosoft), and many critics find substantial similarities between the two games. Game Dev Tycoon was created by Greenheart Games, a company founded in July 2012 by brothers Patrick and Daniel Klug.

== Gameplay ==
The player starts out in a garage in the early 1980s during the golden age of arcade video games with no employees, limited money, and limited choices for the first game. As new games are created, new options are unlocked. When the first game engine is built, the player's game development skills improve. New consoles will also be released, and the player will be able to buy licenses for certain consoles, such as the GS, PlaySystem, mBox, Vena Oasis, TES, and grPad which parody real life consoles and devices with different names due to trademark regulations. As the player progresses through the game further they have the opportunity to move to new offices and hire staff. After that further expansion is available, with players given the opportunity to open an R&D lab when reaching certain requirements that host major projects, allowing the player to unlock things they wouldn't be able to otherwise, such as MMOs and online game shops similar to Steam, Ubisoft Connect, App Store etc. The player may also open up a Hardware Lab to create consoles and devices.

=== Mods ===
The game supports mods written in JavaScript with the gdt-modAPI. As of 16 June 2026, there are 943 mods on Steam Workshop. They range from simple, such as adding new consoles and topics, to making new libraries like UltimateLib. One of the most common ways people make these mods is with a Third-party software component called Ultimate Module Editor (UME).

== Release ==
The game's developers implemented an anti-piracy measure for Game Dev Tycoon. Patrick Klug, founder of Greenheart Games, knowing that the game was likely to be torrented extensively, purposely released a cracked version of the game and uploaded it himself to torrent sites. Gameplay in this version is identical except for one variation, that being that as players progress through the game they receive the following message:

Boss, it seems that while many players play our new game, they steal it by downloading a cracked version rather than buying it legally. If players don't buy the games they like, we will sooner or later go bankrupt.

— Greenheart Games, Game Dev Tycoon

Eventually players of the cracked version will gradually lose money until they do go bankrupt, as a result of pirates. Some players complained on message forums about this piracy feature, unaware that it only appeared because they themselves pirated the game.

Netflix released a mobile version in March 2024 that is free for their subscribers. Which would be withdrawn on March 11, 2026.

== Reception ==
Reception

Aggregate score
Aggregator	Score
Metacritic	PC: 68/100 iOS: 89/100; NS: 81/100

Review score
Publication	Score
TouchArcade	iOS: 5/5

On Metacritic, Game Dev Tycoon received mixed reviews on Windows and positive reviews on iOS and Switch.
