= Business simulation game =

Video game genre

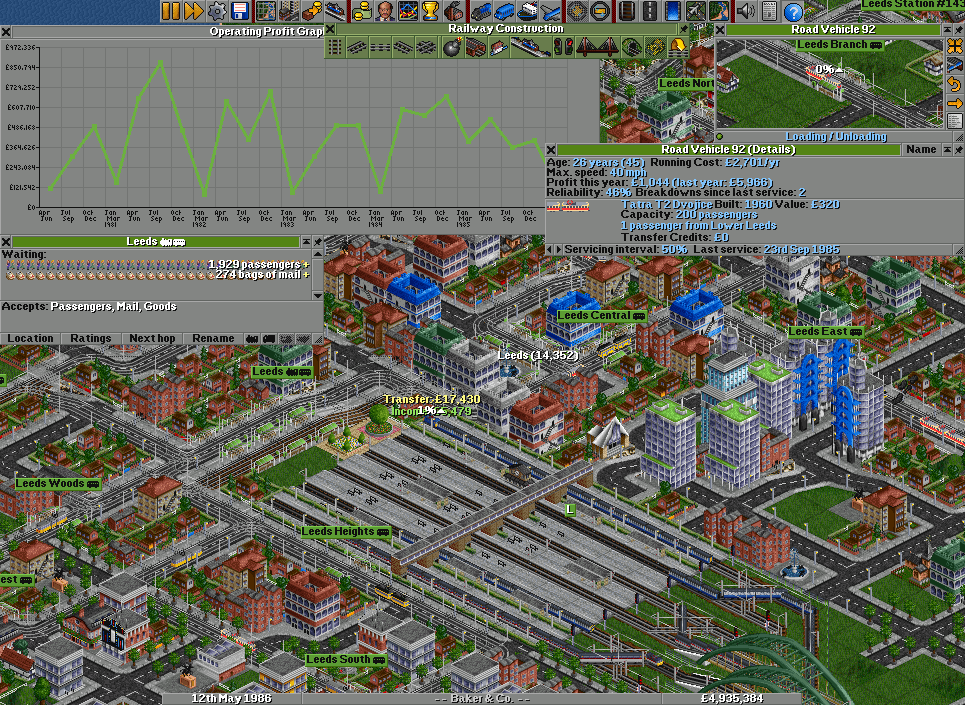
OpenTTD (2004) is a business simulation game in which the player tries to earn money by transporting passengers and freight via road, rail, water and air.

Business simulation games, also known as tycoon games or economic simulation games, are video games that focus on the management of economic processes, usually in the form of a business. Pure business simulations have been described as construction and management simulations without a construction element, and can thus be called simulations. Micromanagement is often emphasized in these kinds of games. They are essentially numeric but try to hold the player's attention by using creative graphics. The interest in these games lies in accurate simulation of real-world events using algorithms, as well as the close tying of players' actions to expected or plausible consequences and outcomes. An important facet of economic simulations is the emergence of artificial systems, gameplay and structures.

There are many games in this genre that have been designed around numerous different enterprises and different simulations. Theme Park can be called a business simulation because the goal of the game is to attract customers and make profits; the game also involves a building aspect that makes it a construction and management simulation. This genre also includes many of the "tycoon" games such as Railroad Tycoon and Transport Tycoon. Another similar example of a business simulation (that models a startup business) is "SimVenture Classic".

Trevor Chan is a notable developer of business simulation games, having developed the 1995 game Capitalism, which has been described as the "best business simulation game". A sequel, entitled Capitalism II, was released in 2001. An expanded version of Capitalism II, called Capitalism Lab, was released in 2012 and continues to be updated regularly with new features and improvements.

Active development of Internet technologies and the growth of the Internet audience in recent years gave a powerful impetus to the development of the industry of online games, and in particular, online business simulations. There are many varieties of online business simulations – browser-based and downloadable, single-player and multiplayer, and real-time and turn-based. Some online simulations are aimed primarily at the leisure market while others have real world applications in training, education and modelling.

== Real-world applications ==
Because business simulations simulate real-world systems, they are often used in management, marketing, economics and hospitality education. Some benefits of business simulations are that they permit students to experience and test themselves in situations before encountering them in real life, they permit students to experiment and test hypotheses, and that subjects seem more real to them than when taught passively from the blackboard. They are also used extensively in the professional world to train workers in the financial industries, hospitality and management, and to study economic models, with some simulations having in excess of 10,000 variables. ABSEL, an association of professionals, exists for the sole purpose of promoting their use, and economic simulations have even been used in experiments, such as those done by Donald Broadbent on learning and cognition that revealed how people often have an aptitude for mastering systems without necessarily comprehending the underlying principles. Other games are used to study the consumer behavior.

== History ==
The Sumerian Game (1964), a text-based early mainframe game designed by Mabel Addis, based on the ancient Sumerian city-state of Lagash, was the first economic simulation game. An early economic sim by Danielle Bunten Berry, titled M.U.L.E. and released in 1983, foreshadowed events that would transpire later in video gaming history, especially in the massively multiplayer online game market, with regard to player cooperation and simulated economies. The game was Electronic Arts' most highly awarded game, despite selling only 30,000 copies. That same year, Epyx released the business sim Oil Barons.

== See also ==
- Business game
- Serious game
- Simulations and games in economics education
- Training simulation
