= Anno 1602 =

1998 video game

- Original German cover art
- Developer: Max Design
- Publishers: EU: Sunflowers Interactive; NA: GT Interactive; WW: Ubisoft (History Edition)
- Designer: Wilfried Reiter
- Series: Anno
- Platform: Microsoft Windows
- Release: DE: April 1998; EU: September 24, 1998; NA: February 1, 2000
- Genres: Real-time strategy, city-building game
- Modes: Single-player, multiplayer

Anno 1602: Creation of a New World, (Note: German: Anno 1602: Erschaffung einer neuen Welt) entitled 1602 A.D. in North America, is a 1998 construction and management video game developed by Max Design and published by Sunflowers Interactive. Set in the early modern period, it requires the player to build colonies on islands of various sizes in an archipelago as they manage resources, exploration, diplomacy and trade. The game design is noteworthy for its attempt to implement a 'progressive' artificial intelligence, meaning that the pace of the game changes in response to how quickly players act.

Anno 1602 was a commercial blockbuster that attracted buyers outside the usual demographic of German computer games, including a significant percentage of female customers. It was the German market's best-selling computer game of 1998, and remained the region's highest seller of all time by 2003, with over 1.7 million units sold in German-speaking countries. The game was less successful in international markets, but ultimately sold above 2.7 million copies worldwide by 2004. Anno 1602 began the Anno series, which led to the sequels Anno 1503, Anno 1701, Anno 1404, Anno 2070, Anno 2205, Anno 1800 and Anno 117.

== Gameplay ==
Anno 1602 is a mix of simulation and strategy gaming where players create a realistic and lively world, modeling it to their liking. The player controls an unnamed European nation in 1602 AD that is looking to expand their power into the New World. As the game starts, the player will need to find a nearby island, colonize it, and start building up an economy. The US release contains all 6 scenarios (in addition to the tutorial and training game) that were included in the original European release, as well as 9 new scenarios, along with a "free play role". Progression centers around satisfying the evolving needs of the colony's population. The ultimate goal of the game is to discover chains of islands, settle them, develop on them, and then trade with other players. Players can also trade with their own colonies, and various neutral CPU controlled players such as native tribesmen. As players build homes, the residents go through various social classes: Pioneers, Settlers, Citizens, and Merchants, each demanding more sophisticated goods such as cloth, alcohol, tobacco, and spices. Meeting these demands unlocks further buildings and economic possibilities. Failing to meet needs can lead to population decline, riots, or loss of tax income .

While military conquest is available, Anno 1602 is often praised for allowing peaceful strategies. Players can win by economic dominance and trade efficiency, without relying heavily on military force. However, military units such as musketeers, cannons, and warships can be used to defend or attack colonies, and players can engage in combat against other computer-controlled factions or multiplayer opponents. The player can choose to play out one of the game's many scenarios or engage in a free form game. The game also features online and network play with up to 4 other players simultaneously. Because the network play is less sophisticated than that of modern games, lags and disconnections often occur. Despite this, Anno 1602 is still occasionally played by small groups of LAN PC gamers, or by players over the internet. The game is also playable via null modem connection.

=== Civilizations ===
Anno 1602 is designed to be as nationalistically neutral as possible. After entering a character name, the player is asked to pick one of four different colored banners to represent their country. The absence of different civilizations with different characteristics contrasts with other games such as The Settlers, and Age of Empires. Diplomacy is also limited in this entry of the Anno series. Players can interact with neutral factions (such as native tribes or free traders), but these interactions are relatively shallow compared to later entries. The emphasis remains on economic growth, production chains, and resource management.

=== Technology ===
Unlike other games where technology plays a major role in one player defeating another, Anno 1602 instead makes technology upgrades more relevant in inner-colony affairs. Instead of buying upgrades to ships to perform better in huge naval battles, it is often the case that upgrades are made so that the ships can carry more cargo, and therefore make the colony more money. The majority of the buildings in the game also can / must be technologically upgraded throughout the game to please the colony's citizens, which produces more cash for the colony, with which the player can continue upgrading their nation and expand to other islands.

=== Buildings ===
Anno 1602 is about discovery. As the colony grows and spreads, the player gains access to more and more building types and citizens construct bigger and more impressive housing for themselves. The player is required to reach a certain population level before access is gained to weapons factories. Once the player has the factories, a large number of buildings are needed to produce weapons, and additional buildings to construct units. After the buildings are constructed, the player must pay a constant flow of money to keep each building running. This "line of production", though difficult, has been incorporated into newer games such as Stronghold.

=== Custom scenarios ===
Anno 1602 allows for the creation of user-made maps, using the Scenario Builder. This tool is simpler and easier to learn than comparable editors used in more modern games, but it has fewer capabilities. This, along with instant "Random Maps", keeps many players coming back to Anno 1602. The game features a progressive difficulty curve, with scenarios introducing new mechanics over time.

Not all versions of Anno 1602 shipped with a map editor, therefore several fan-made editors were created.

== Development ==
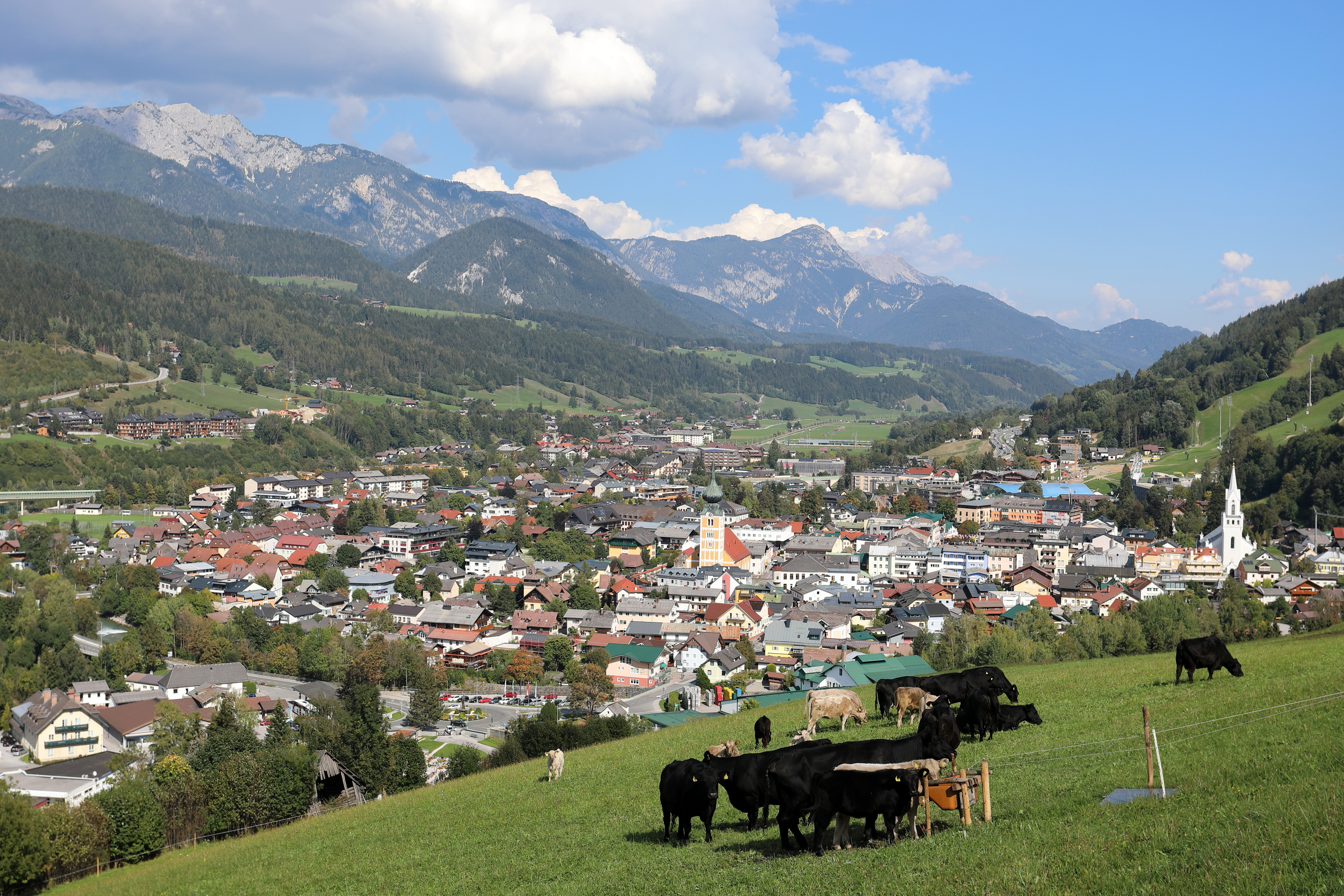
Anno 1602 was developed in the rural Austrian town of Schladming.

Anno 1602 was conceived in April 1996 at Max Design, a Schladming-based game developer founded in 1991. Following a period of financial turmoil in which the company neared bankruptcy, the team began Anno as a spiritual sequel to its earlier title 1869 – Hart am Wind!, a competitor of The Patrician. The team at Max Design numbered only four members: designer Wilfried Reiter, brothers Martin and Albert Lasser and artist Ulli Koller. Anno 1602's design occurred gradually. From December 17-22, 2018, the game was given away to Uplay users for free on PC.

== Distribution and commercial performance ==
=== Debut ===
Anno 1602 was a commercial hit. In the German market, the title debuted in first place on Media Control's computer game sales rankings for the second half of April 1998, and held the position after six weeks on the charts. By that time, it had sold 200,000 units. Der Spiegel reported in June that this performance made Anno the title with "the best chance to become the German number one this year". The game subsequently received a "Platinum" award from the Verband der Unterhaltungssoftware Deutschland (VUD), for sales of at least 200,000 units throughout the German-speaking world: Germany, Austria and Switzerland. Anno 1602's streak at #1 ended in the latter half of June when Commandos: Behind Enemy Lines captured the spot, which it maintained for 16 weeks. Sunflowers' game remained at second on the Media Control charts for the last two weeks of June, July, August and September.

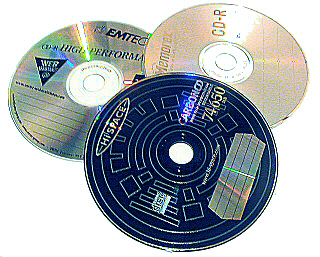
According to PC Games, Anno 1602 succeeded in the German market partly because it shipped on extended-capacity CD-ROMs to impede "piracy".

Accruing 360,000 domestic sales by September, Anno 1602 was the German market's best-selling game during the first nine months of 1998. PC Games' Petra Maueröder wrote that Germany was "plagued by the Anno 1602 fever" in the half-year following its release, while Max Falkenstern likened it to a "pandemic" in Games Aktuell. The game's sales for the period resulted in a 300% increase in Sunflowers' year-over-year revenue, to DM 20 million. Remarking on this success at the time, Eva Müller and Hans-Peter Canibol of Focus noted that Sunflowers had become "one of the few German companies that [has] asserted itself in the American-dominated [computer game] market". Sunflowers forecast sales of 600,000 units for Anno by the end of 1998, based on its performance earlier in the year. The game claimed second on Media Control's charts during the last two weeks of October, below Need for Speed 3, and then dropped to #3 for the second halves of November and December. Sales had risen to 400,000 units after six months of availability, and Anno 1602 ultimately became the German market's best-selling computer game of 1998. At the 1999 Milia festival in Cannes, it took home a "Gold" prize for revenues above €15 million in the European Union during the previous year.

The high sales of Anno 1602 in German-speaking countries derived partly from Sunflowers' copy protection scheme, according to PC Games. Although the game launched as a direct competitor of StarCraft, it significantly outsold that title in the region by the end of 1998, despite the latter's success worldwide. Petra Maueröder reported that, because StarCraft had shipped without copy protection in Germany, its piracy rate there reached nine illegal copies for every legal version sold. Conversely, Sunflowers attempted to combat pirates by making Anno 1602 "one of the first games" printed on extended-capacity CD-ROMs, a writer for PC Games noted. These exceeded the storage limits of standard discs, which made Anno 1602 incompatible with most consumer CD-Rs and burners of the time. The effort resulted in faulty disc shipments, a common issue for extended-capacity CDs, but was ultimately judged by PC Games as "a complete success, despite the availability of cracks".

=== Later years ===
Anno 1602 became one of the construction and management simulations that "dominated the German sales charts for years", according to Der Spiegel's Frank Patalong. By the end of January 1999, it had spent 38 weeks on Media Control's bestsellers list, ranking fourth that month. It soon became the first computer game to earn the VUD's "Double-Platinum" award, for 400,000 sales in German-speaking countries. By May, Anno 1602 had sold through 600,000 units in the German market and—together with its expansion pack New Islands, New Adventures—one million copies across Europe. PC Games declared it the German-speaking world's most successful computer title from April 1998–July 1999, and, as of September, the region's biggest computer game hit of all time. It continued to appear in Media Control's sales rankings through the latter half of September 1999, when it charted in 26th place and secured its 70th consecutive week in the top rankings. Sales surpassed 650,000 units by October; New Islands had sold above 200,000 units by that date.

In the second part of October 1999, Anno 1602: Königs-Edition debuted at #4 on Media Control's charts. Announced in August for a fall launch, the SKU bundled Anno 1602 and New Islands with unique bonus missions. The new version had spent 10 weeks in the rankings by the end of 1999, including a seventh-place finish for December. It continued to chart in Media Control's top 10 during 2000: the Königs-Edition reached #4 for the month of February and remained at 11th by August, having spent 12 months in the top 30. The following month, Infogrames Germany announced Anno's re-release as a "Soft Price" budget title, with its cost reduced to DM 40. The Soft Price edition took #6 in October and November 2000 on Media Control's charts for budget-priced games, and stayed in the top 15 for February and March 2001. Anno 1602's sales had risen above one million units in German-speaking countries by September 2000, and by April 2001 had surpassed 1.5 million units worldwide. Global sales increased to 1.7 million copies by October 2001, of which the Königs-Edition accounted for 170,000 units. The SKU was re-released that month under Electronic Arts' "Classics" label, again at a budget price, and it debuted in 11th place on Media Control's budget charts for November.

Anno 1602 had sold 2 million times by December 2001, including "well over a million" in the German-speaking world, according to Sunflowers. That month, the company revealed a new partnership with "ak tronic", a rack jobber known for its budget-priced "Pyramid" displays in German stores. This type of budget line formed a significant part of the German game market, and journalist Jörg Langer later called it a key to Anno's high lifetime sales. Under the agreement, ak tronic included budget-priced (€10) copies of Anno 1602 in its Pyramid displays, starting with a shipment of 250,000 units in January 2002. Peter Schroer of ak tronic forecast 500,000 sales for Anno's Pyramid edition by the end of 2002. In the German market, the new release proceeded to sell 50,000 units in its first month on shelves, and it rose to #1 on Media Control's budget charts in February 2002. Taking second in March, it finished with top-10 placements in June, July, August, September, October and November. Media Control named it Germany's best-selling budget computer game (€28<) of the year, while its sequel Anno 1503 took first place for 2002 among full-price titles.

By April 2003, Anno 1602 remained the German market's biggest-ever computer game hit. Its Pyramid edition secured top-10 positions on Media Control's budget charts for the first three months of that year. After an 11th-place finish in June, the Pyramid edition had spent 17 consecutive months in Media Control's top 20. Anno 1602's global sales climbed to 2.7 million units by September 2004. In 2007, Jörg Langer wrote that the Pyramid edition alone had contributed roughly 750,000 sales to the game's lifetime total.

=== Demographics ===
According to Heiko Klinge of GameStar, a significant number of Anno buyers fell outside the standard demographic for German computer games. By 2000, Sunflowers noted a high "proportion of inexperienced players and women in the Anno fan base", which it attributed to the game's design goal of "play without stress". Klinge echoed this theory. Der Spiegel similarly reported Anno's wide appeal among both casual and hardcore players, and the magazine's Carsten Görig argued that "many can agree on Anno because Anno is a phenomenon". Der Spiegel's Richard Löwenstein cited Anno as an early computer game to draw female players; he claimed in 2002 that approximately 25% of its buyers were women. In 2011, Klinge likewise called the game's number of female players "an absolute novelty" before The Sims, and reported that women made up nearly 50% of Anno 1602 customers.

Anno 1602's success was primarily contained to the German market; GameStar reported that, like Gothic, it failed to make an "international breakthrough". Sunflowers president Adi Boiko remarked: "When we wanted to distribute Anno 1602 internationally, we encountered enormous prejudices that a game from Germany couldn't be anything special". Of Anno 1602's 2.5 million worldwide sales by late 2002, the German market accounted for 1.7 million. The title's limited crossover in other markets was common among German games, particularly in Anno's genre of construction and management, despite the outsize popularity of such titles in the German-speaking world. Der Spiegel's Frank Patalong argued that games like Anno 1602 were a "specifically German phenomenon: nowhere else in the world are [these] simulations as successful as here at home". Stefan Schmitt of Der Spiegel and Jochen Gebauer of Games Aktuell wrote that such games were especially disliked in the United States, and a writer for GameStar stated that no Anno title had been a hit in that market by mid-2006. Boiko noted that it was "very difficult for us to find a good distributor" in the United States, which led to Anno 1602's delayed release and lack of marketing there. However, he was pleased with its 200,000 sales in the country by early 2002. This number rose to 250,000 units by that November.

== Reception ==
=== Initial release ===
Reception

Review scores
Publication	Score
PC Gamer (UK)	81%
PC Zone	80 out of 100

=== North American version ===
Reception

Aggregate score
Aggregator	Score
GameRankings	74%

Review scores
Publication	Score
Computer Games Magazine	3.5/5
Computer Gaming World	2.5/5
PC Gamer (US)	57%
The Electric Playground	7/10

== Legacy ==
Anno 1602 began the Anno series. Anno 1602 was one of the first PC games to popularize the "economic city-builder" genre in German-speaking countries. It became one of the best-selling PC games of all time in Germany, selling over 2.5 million copies by 2006 . This commercial success established the Anno franchise, which has since continued with entries such as Anno 1503, Anno 1404, and Anno 1800. In 2018, PC Games named it one of the most influential games ever released.

== See also ==
- Unknown Horizons
- Video gaming in Germany
