= Kazuhisa Hashimoto =

Japanese video game developer (1958–2020)

- 橋本和久
- Born: November 15, 1958 (Note: Hashimoto's age on death has been reported as both 61 and 79. The 2003 Dorimaga interview gives a 1958 birthdate consistent with the age of 61.)
- Died: February 25, 2020 (aged 61)
- Occupation: Video game developer
- Known for: Konami Code

Kazuhisa Hashimoto (橋本和久, Hashimoto Kazuhisa; November 15, 1958 – February 25, 2020) was a Japanese video game developer, best known for having created the Konami Code, a cheat code used in numerous video games typically granting the player extra lives or other benefits, and which has become often used as an Easter egg in popular culture.

== Career ==
Hashimoto joined Konami along with several other recent college graduates in 1981. At the time, Konami was focused on coin-operated (coin-op) products such as medal games, and Hashimoto started by helping to develop the circuit boards for these games. Konami expanded over the next few years into arcade games with successful games like Scramble and Super Cobra, and later into bringing these games into versions for the Nintendo Entertainment System (NES). According to Hashimoto, the company's focus at the time still remained the coin-op machines, with experienced staff assigned to that area of the business. The newer hires were pushed off onto development of the video game side of Konami with little formal training or instruction. Once the Super Nintendo Entertainment System (SNES) had arrived in 1990, Konami had brought in experienced video game developers and helped establish more rigor to the development process.

One of the first NES games Hashimoto worked on was the conversion of Track & Field, a project that took six months between himself and another programmer. He later came back to the game to help design a special controller to use for the game as players reported it painful to use the standard NES controller. Gradius was also a port of an arcade game they were ordered to make, which took Hashimoto and three others less than six months to complete. Other games Hashimoto had developed at Konami included The Goonies for NES, and The Legend of the Mystical Ninja.

Hashimoto continued to work at Konami through the rest of his life and has credits on at least nine games. Among other titles he worked on included the International Superstar Soccer series. He was also the executive vice president of Star Online.

Hashimoto died on February 25, 2020, as reported by both Konami and by Hashimoto's friend Yuji Takenouchi.

== Konami Code ==
The button press sequence of the Konami Code

Hashimoto is most widely recognized as the creator of the Konami Code. Hashimoto had inadvertently created it while bringing the arcade version of Gradius to the NES in 1986. Hashimoto knew the arcade version of the game was hard and he would likely not finish it, so he added a sequence of button presses that he could easily remember that gave the ship he controlled in the game the full range of power-ups so that he could easily complete the game for in-house testing purposes. He had intended to remove the programming code for that sequence before the game was shipped, but the game had shipped with the code included. Some players of Gradius had discovered Hashimoto's sequence and reported it back to Konami, and it became popular to use Hashimoto's sequence in future Konami titles by other developers. Larger public awareness of this Konami code came with the worldwide popularity of Contra in 1988, in which entering the code gave the player additional lives. Since then, the Konami code is not only used across other video games from other developers and publishers in similar manners, but as Easter eggs in other forms of media.
