= Konami Code =

Cheat code, originally for Konami games

The Konami Code

The Konami Code (Japanese: コナミコマンド, Konami Komando, "Konami command"), also commonly referred to as the Contra Code and sometimes the 30 Lives Code, is a cheat code that appears in many video games developed by Konami, as well as some non-Konami games.

The code has also found a place in popular culture as a reference to the third generation of video game consoles, and is present as an Easter egg on a number of websites.

== Sequence ==
In the original code, the player has to press the following sequence of buttons on the game controller to enable a cheat or other effects: ↑↑↓↓←→←→BA; sometimes Start and/or Select is added to the sequence.

== History ==
The Konami Code was first used in the release of Gradius (1986), a scrolling shooter for the NES and was popularized among North American players in the NES version of Contra. The code is also known as the "Contra Code" and "30 Lives Code", since the code provided the player 30 lives in Contra. The code has been used to help novice players progress through the game.

The Konami Code was created by Kazuhisa Hashimoto, who was developing the home port of the 1985 arcade game Gradius for the NES. Finding the game too difficult to play through during testing, he created the cheat code, which gives the player a full set of power-ups (normally attained gradually throughout the game). After entering the sequence using the controller when the game was paused, the player received all available power-ups. The code was meant to be removed prior to publishing, but this was overlooked and only discovered as the game was being prepared for mass production. The developers decided to leave it there, as removing it could result in new bugs and glitches. The sequence was easy enough to remember for testers and simultaneously sufficiently hard to enter accidentally during the gameplay for unsuspecting users.

The Konami Code was thus included in the series' other sequels and spin-offs, with some key differences. The code has been subsequently re-used in a large number of other games and other computer programs.

== Examples in video games ==
Tetris (Tengen version for Nintendo Entertainment System)
Entering this code minus ↑↑ while paused will change the current Tetromino into the I piece, also called a longbar. This can be done only once per game.
Castlevania: Legacy of Darkness (Nintendo 64)
A Konami code variant was discovered in the game in 2024. The code unlocks all four characters, their outfits, and a hard difficulty mode.
Yu-Gi-Oh! The Falsebound Kingdom (GameCube)
The Konami code can be used during any map to gain gold. This will also trigger hidden dialogue of a man shouting Yu-Gi-Oh.
Gradius Galaxies (Game Boy Advance)
Inputting the Konami code causes the player's spaceship to self-destruct after receiving all power-ups. However, if ←←→→ is substituted with LLRR, the player can receive all power-ups with no penalty other than losing a life.
The Incredibles (THQ and Heavy Iron Studios, Windows, Mac, Xbox, PlayStation 2)
Inputting the code into the cheats keyboard "UUDDLRLRBAS" gives the player 25% health, and can be used an unlimited number of times.
Ratchet & Clank: Up Your Arsenal (PlayStation 2)
Entering the code in the pause menu will replace the Omniwrench with a doubled ended lightsaber. In the PlayStation 3 version, whether by accident or design, two debug codes were left in the game by the developers.
LittleBigPlanet 2 (Media Molecule, PlayStation 3)
When entered in the unused arcade machine at the level "Set the Controls for the Heart of the Negativatron" (PlayStation 3 variation of the code), the machine explodes and unveils a square with the numbers "3733 5683", which on a mobile keypad, spells the phrase "free love".
Adventure Time: Hey Ice King! Why'd You Steal Our Garbage?!! (Nintendo DS, Nintendo 3DS)
Inputting the code on the title screen results in an animated looping clip of an 8-bit recreation of Adventure Time's creator, Pendleton Ward dancing. To the left of Ward is an 8-bit version of Jake, and to the right, an 8-bit version of Finn.
BioShock Infinite (Irrational Games, Windows, Xbox 360, Xbox One, PlayStation 3, PlayStation 4, Nintendo Switch)
A variation of the Konami Code at the game's menus unlocks the game's more difficult "1999 Mode" from the start.
Metal Gear Rising: Revengeance
Code entry unlocks Revengeance and Very Hard difficulties without passing the game on Hard difficulty.
Sportsfriends (PlayStation 3, PlayStation 4)
The code allows to play FLOP, a wiggly variant of Pong. A similar code accesses the hidden game Get on Top.
Dead by Daylight (Windows, Xbox One, PlayStation 4, Nintendo Switch)
When the code is entered while having one of the Silent Hill characters equipped on the main menu, the game plays a jingle from Gradius and grants the player a charm that can be equipped by characters.
Fortnite Battle Royale (Windows, MacOS, Xbox One, PlayStation 4, Nintendo Switch, mobile)
The Konami code was used to access the Fortnite Durr Burger minigame at the black hole screen after the end of the Chapter 1 Season X event.
Tetris Effect
Entering the code at the launch screen enables a second screen accepting a code. Inputting the number "06061984" (representing June 6, 1984, the "birth date" of Tetris) will then unlock the "1984" level.
Anno 1800 (Ubisoft Blue Byte, Windows)
On PC entering the code within the gameworld spawns hundreds of random animals flying through the air and chaotically bouncing off the terrain, while on console editions it allows the player to enter a first person mode.
Bloodstained: Ritual of the Night
This spiritual sequel to Castlevania developed by Koji Igarashi lets players enter a "1986 Mode", which makes the game's controls more similar to the more difficult Castlevania series, by entering the Konami Code at a menu screen.
Ultrakill (Windows)
Entering the code during gameplay unlocks a cheat menu, with cheats bound to keyboard keys.
Insaniquarium Deluxe (Windows, Microsoft Windows, Mac OS X, mobile phone, Palm OS, Windows Mobile, PDA)
Entering the code in the main menu unlocks the secret "Sandbox Mode".

Edge://surf (Edge browser game)
Entering the code in the edge://surf main menu unlocks a special ninja cat character, with which you can play.
Hollow Knight: Silksong
Entering the Konami code in the "Extras" menu unlocks "Steel Soul", a difficult game mode in which death is permanent, without completing a full playthrough first.
Anno 117
Entering the code on console editions of the game allows the player like its predecessor Anno 1800 to enter a first person mode and traverse their land as one of their citizens.
Assassin's Creed III
When aiming at a turkey at the Davenport homestead, the code triggers a special animation. The exact input required differs by console.
Superman Returns
Entering the Konami code (↑↑↓↓←→←→YX) during the Metropolis level for infinite stamina, reduces the player's Xbox Live Gamerscore of 0 and earns them the achievement of "Not That Super", locking them out of any other achievement they would have obtained throughout the game.: there are no players online: entering the konami code allows the player to regain access to servers once banned.

Castlevania: Belmont's Curse

Entering the Konami code unlocks a secret skin based on Sonia Belmont, in reference to the main character of the game Castlevania Legends

== Examples outside of video games ==
- Entering a version of the Konami code in the Opera Browser in versions between 19 and 54 activated hidden advanced settings.
- A variation of the Konami code is used to reset the Netflix program on some devices.
- Entering the code on any Discord Error 404 website will unlock a secret game of Snake.
- Entering the code on the 2016 Marks and Spencer Christmas food ordering site resulted in some festive creatures popping up.
- Entering the code on the Megaport website enables a rudimentary 2D platformer game the user can play.
- Entering the Konami Code on the Bank of Canada's website for the commemorative $10 bill plays a chiptune version of the Canadian national anthem and drops commemorative $10 notes.
- Entering the code on a Google Hangouts conversation and pressing enter used to change the background of the conversation typed in.
- Reciting the code to Google Assistant will cause it to say either "Cheat mode enabled", or "You destroyed the Vile Red Falcon and saved the universe. Consider yourself a hero" with a trophy emoji or a similar response.
- Reciting the code to Apple's virtual assistant Siri will cause her to give one of three responses: "Cheater!", "Nerd." or "I'm getting dizzy...". The user will need to say "enter" instead of "start", as this will confuse Siri in thinking a timer is being set.
- Reciting the code to Amazon's Alexa will cause her to say: "Ding Ding Ding Ding Ding! Great job, you've secured all the power-ups!", "Sorry, so close, no power-ups for you." or "Super Alexa mode, activated. Starting reactors, online. Enabling advanced systems, online. Raising dongers. Error. Dongers missing. Aborting."
- Entering the code on the WWF-UK website will cause the panda logo to spin.
- Entering the code on the Twitch Creator's Dashboard used to bring up several advanced options for the program.
- At one point, the Facebook website contained an Easter Egg where after entering the Konami code, a lens flare would be generated whenever the user would scroll or click anywhere on the page.
- The Chromebook Pixel has an Easter egg where inputting the Konami Code would cause the lights on an LED strip on the lid of the computer to blink rapidly.
- The code was part of the secret URL for the Linus Tech Tips "Verified Gamer" program to counter the Great GPU Shortage.
- Within the Unreal Engine 5 demonstration program Valley of the Ancient, entering the Konami Code will cause the giant robot within it to dab.
- Typing "upupdowndownleftrightleftrightbastart" on some Palm/HP webOS devices enables developer mode.
- Three Fisher-Price toys, one modeled after a game controller, one modeled after a Game Boy, and one modeled after a Nintendo Switch (which show various lights and sounds when the buttons are pressed) present a special sequence of lights and sounds if the Konami code is entered. The controller toy says the words "You win!" after the sound effects.
- King Candy in the film Wreck-It Ralph uses the Konami code to access a locked portion of the code of Sugar Rush.
- On Twitter, until the site's rebranding to X, if the Konami code was entered on the home page, the logo present in the top left corner would spin.
- The 2001 song "Anyone Else but You," by the Moldy Peaches, includes the lyrics "Up up down down left right left right B A start / Just because we use cheats doesn't mean we're not smart."
- An additional color palette (based on Contra's colors) in League Settings is unlocked on 4 Player Game Night Organizer when the Konami Code is entered outside of a text field.
- In several scenes of the 2021 film "Fear Street Part One: 1994", Josh repeats the Konami Code to his sister Deena as a sort of talisman.
