= Anno 2205 =

City-building and economic simulation video game

- Developer: Blue Byte
- Publisher: Ubisoft
- Director: Dirk Riegert
- Composer: Dynamedion
- Series: Anno
- Platform: Microsoft Windows
- Release: 3 November 2015
- Genres: City-building, Real-Time Strategy
- Mode: Single-player

Anno 2205 is a city-building and economic simulation game, with real-time strategy elements, developed by Blue Byte and published by Ubisoft. Anno 2205 is the sixth game of the Anno series, and was released worldwide on 3 November 2015. As with Anno 2070, the game is set in the future, with players having the opportunity to set up colonies on the Moon. It received mixed reviews on launch.

== Gameplay ==
Anno 2205 is a futuristic city-building video game similar to Anno 2070, as opposed to the previous installments which feature a historical setting. In the game, players take on the role of a leader from a corporation and must compete against other corporations in developing future technologies. At the beginning of the game, players are tasked to build different metropolises on Earth. Population increases when more buildings are built, and players are tasked to satisfy and fulfill the needs of their citizens. Besides building housing, players must also produce goods and build infrastructures like robot production facilities to maintain their economy, where said buildings can be relocated or moved around by players. Similar to SimCity, different parts can be added to buildings to enhance their functions. Upgrading the production structures of these buildings can also improve their efficiency. When citizens' demands were satisfied, they are able to produce more goods.

Eventually players are asked to develop and conduct research in arctic regions in order to find cost-efficient ways to launch rockets to the Moon and upon completion, players may colonize the Moon and build cities inside its craters. Resources of the Moon, such as helium-3, are vital to the development of the cities on Earth and can be sent back to Earth. Gameplay differs when players are establishing an outpost in the arctic regions or on the Moon. In the arctic regions players must manage the heating areas of the outpost. As the Moon lacks an atmosphere and features a grimmer environment than Earth, building a city on the Moon requires erecting asteroid shields, as well as unique greenhouses to produce food. Anno 2205 also includes a fully functional day and night cycle for different visuals.

The game also introduces a session mode, which allows player to control and manage their cities both on Earth and on the Moon at the same time. Resources vary in different sessions, as a result, players must set up trade routes between different colonies, so that resources and raw materials from a city can be used in another city. The cities in the game are five times larger than the ones in its predecessors, and they support at least eight different sessions. Pollution, as well as the underwater gameplay featured in Anno 2070 was removed from 2205. Bridges can be built to connect cities, while buildings can be upgraded via using different modules. Upon completion, the upgraded buildings can produce more goods.

Information in 2205 is presented visually instead of utilizing text like the previous installments. Citizens' demands appear as images or icons. Happiness of citizens influence their actions. If they are happy, they can be seen travelling around the city. However, if they are not, they will abandon their buildings and leave. Multiple camera angles are available for players to use. They can zoom in and zoom out, or to use pre-defined cameras to view the city. The structure of the game's story is also overhauled, in which players are not forced to complete the missions, and that players can choose to complete it during the free play.

Naval battles can no longer occur near cities, instead taking take place in remote regions and are optional. It is possible for owned sectors to be blockaded and the fleet can be called to break through. Expanding computer players have also been removed.

In post update 1.6, every corporation can join the stock market. Doing so adds another layer of gameplay in the form of shares and auctions for both that player's corporation and all five rivals, corporate espionage and dominance and eventually monopolization for various industrial sectors.

== Development ==
Blue Byte revealed that after 2070, which received critical acclaim, the franchise would move to a new direction, in which the setting of the game continues to move into the future. The game is being developed by Blue Byte, primarily at its Mainz studio, the developer of Anno 1701 and Anno 1404. The game chose not to include any online multiplayer feature because the developer hoped players could focus on their own cities, and have full control of them. The game also introduced more features, as the studio wanted to add something fresh to the franchise with 2205, and the gameplay was made more streamlined.

Anno 2205 was announced during Ubisoft's Electronic Entertainment Expo 2015 conference, including its Season Pass. The full game, as well as additional content, is included in the Gold Edition of 2205. Players who pre-ordered the game were to gain access to the game's closed beta. The closed beta was cancelled, and players who pre-ordered the game received an in-game bonus instead (a new command ship skin).

Upon the game's release, it was supported with downloadable content. Wildwater Bay, a free expansion which introduces a new session, and a new sector project was included in update 1.3. Update 1.6 included the Big Five Pack, which added the option for every corporation to join that stock market, which would enable additional gameplay features, and reintroduced disasters. Two expansions, namely Tundra and Orbit were released on February 29 and July 20, 2016, respectively. On October 4, the Frontiers expansion was released, containing three new sectors: Madrigal Islands, Savik Province and the Greentide Archipelago. Later this content was added to Season Pass after getting negative feedback from customers that "Frontiers" was released outside the Season Pass.

== Reception ==
Reception

Aggregate score
Aggregator	Score
Metacritic	72/100

Review scores
Publication	Score
GameSpot	5/10
IGN	7/10
PC Gamer (US)	73/100

The game received mixed reviews upon launch. While most reviews have praised for its graphics and animations, the disappointments were due to its over-simplistic gameplay compared to its predecessors, lack of randomly generated maps, combat only in side missions and lack of multiplayer, limiting the replay value of the game.
