= Anno 1701 =

2006 video game

- Developer: Related Designs
- Publishers: Sunflowers Interactive; Deep Silver; Ubisoft (History Edition)
- Director: Thomas Pottkämper
- Designer: Dirk Riegert
- Programmers: Thomas Stein; Kevin Zellner
- Artist: Sebastian Steinberg
- Writer: Karin Trost
- Composer: Dynamedion
- Series: Anno
- Platform: Windows
- Release: GER: October 26, 2006; NA: October 30, 2006; EU: November 3, 2006
- Genres: Real-time strategy, city-building game
- Modes: Single-player, multiplayer

Anno 1701, also marketed as 1701 A.D., is a real-time strategy and city building video game, part of the Anno series. It is developed by Related Designs and published by Sunflowers Interactive Entertainment Software. It revolves around building and maintaining an 18th-century colony in the "New World". With a budget of €10 million, it was the most expensive German game ever produced by 2006.

It is the sequel to Anno 1602 and Anno 1503 and was followed by Anno 1404.

== Gameplay ==
Anno 1701, like the previous Anno games, is a game based mainly on the economics of the settlement created by the player.

There are two main game modes in Anno 1701: continuous play, representing an open-ended session, and ten scenarios with certain tasks, which gradually increase in level of difficulty. The continuous play offers free customization options for the start of the game. Similar to Civilization series, the players can decide on the size of the world in advance, determine the island types and toggle the advanced options such as "Disasters", "Plague", "Pirates", "Fire", and others. All twelve computer controlled opponents have their own personalities, preferences and difficulty levels.

At the beginning of a game, the player starts with accounts on any island or with an expedition ship. First, he tries to build a small settlement on an island and supply himself with basic goods and resources. During those activities, other rivals are also strengthening and try to gain a foothold in the game world in the same way. As the player progresses through the game, players have access to lodge activities and troops which allow them to invade and ultimately to defeat other players. Now, players are settling the island world in the queen's name. Thus, she expects subservience and respect. Different opponents have different relationships with the queen, and they will react according to the player's choices.

At the start of the game, all of a player's citizens are pioneers. They pay little amounts of taxes, and require only food and a town center. And as the player manages the economy, settlements start attracting high tax paying settlers, citizen and finally merchants. As a player's empire develops, so does their population. They begin upgrading (provided they have sufficient goods), paying more taxes, but also requiring more goods, such as tobacco products, perfume, lamp oil, and much more.

Players can trade with other opponents settling under the Queen's name, or with foreign cultures. All foreign cultures are on small or medium islands, and cannot leave their island. Liang Wu and his Asians are found on islands in the north of the island world. They trade the colonial good Jade, and purchase food. Poxacoatl and his Aztecs live on islands in the southern zone, are few in number and believe in the infinite power of the gods. They trade the colonial goods Talismans, and purchase cloth and horses. Amin Sahir and his Indians have a small settlement on one of the islands in the southern end of the island world. Their Indian Ivory is a desirable colonial good. Tetonka and his Iroquois are situated in a dense forest on one of the islands in the northern zone of the island world. The Iroquois trade furs, and purchase tobacco products and weapons. Ramirez and his Pirates take refuge in expertly concealed hideouts in the southern zone of the island world. Due to their aggressive nature they take rich rewards from raids, therefore they can offer all colonial goods.

The Free Trader, a neutral merchant who sails his fleet around the world to trade, can offer players opportunities to assist him in matters. The assignments are optional, but the reward is immense, and sometimes crucial to financial success. In some assignments, players have to deliver select goods, while in others, players have to destroy ships. Traveling dignitaries can now visit your city and enhance the quality and power of a player's empire. For example, when the smith arrives, he replenishes tool supplies. The entertainers can brighten the moods of the populace, leading to increased tax revenue. Guests of honor come at random times during each social stage of the game, and can also be called to visit once the senate is unlocked.

All buildings, ships and troops cause running costs. To achieve a positive economic balance, the player is essentially open to two options. The main source of income is taxes. Unlike the previous game in the series, the players can choose how much to tax their people. Low taxes are required for a social upgrade and please the people, while higher taxes lead to revolt and a lower population. The new goods available include chocolate, perfume, and colonial goods (Ivory, Jade, Talismans, Furs). Also, goods can now be purchased in a village center, instead of at individual stands that had to be built individually in previous Anno games.

Lodge activities are accessed at the beginning of the game, although only the spy is available for use. All the other lodge activities are researched throughout the game at either a school or a university. Some of the very powerful activities available to players include the deployment of the poisoner (who introduces the plague to an opponent's settlement) or the demagogue (who can rally workers to walk away from their jobs). Players are now subject to Mother Nature's wrath. Hurricanes, earthquakes, and volcanic eruptions all have the power to destroy settlements. Diseases are also rampant in the 1701 AD world, specifically the plague, which can wipe out hundreds, or even thousands, of people. The plague of rats can ruin tons of goods as well.

=== Warfare ===
The warfare in Anno 1701 is divided into two areas, the war at sea and the war on land. At sea, players are fighting with warships who can disturb the enemy economic cycle by attacking enemy ships.

On land, players fight with a limited range of troops, which includes artillery, infantry, and cavalry. Troops are transported by means of ships to enemy islands and dropped off there. They can then gradually gain control of the area and the enemy's buildings through the destruction of enemy market buildings.

== Development ==
In December 2003, a spin-off of the Anno franchise was announced under the title of Anno War. Unlike previous entries in the series, it was developed by Mainz-based Related Designs, and the idea was to make the game more combat based. The team increased their number of employees from 10 to 25, with an active support from Sunflowers Interactive. The game was put on hold. Related Designs instead focused their efforts on a sequel to Anno 1503.

The new installment was initially codenamed Anno 3. Due to a dispute between Sunflowers and the developer of the first Anno games, Max Design, Related Designs was not able to access the program code for Anno 1503, and thus had no technical basis. Therefore, the studio had to develop the new title from scratch. During the development, Anno's creator and one of the Max Design's founders, Wilfried Reiter, joined the team in an advisory capacity.

In September 2004, a first prototype of the game was shown. The focus of the presentation was on the new 3D graphics, partly based on an earlier title of Related Designs, No Man's Land, with which the game separated itself from its predecessors. The graphic artists were inspired by the architecture and art of medieval epochs, such as Gothic or Renaissance. Sunflowers instructed all developers to play previous Anno games, and commissioned an "annolysis"; a survey spanning more than 5,000 players. The results were used to develop the game with the players and their wishes in mind, which prompted the return of the tax system, and introduced camera align and a look behind the buildings.

On May 9, 2005, Sunflowers officially made the game's title as Anno 1701 and released in late 2006. The game was presented along with ParaWorld on the Sunflowers' booth at E3 2006. In August, the release date was marked as October 26, 2006 for the Germany, while the game went gold in early October.

A multi-core processors support was added to the engine's implementation to improve the efficiency. In addition, numerous shaders were built into the game in order to achieve a better performance on as many hardware configurations as possible.

Anno 1701 was the most expensive German game ever made at the time of its release, with a budget of €10 million.

=== Soundtrack ===
After using music samples in the two predecessors, Anno 1701 is the first to use specially composed orchestral music. Tilman Sillescu from Dynamedion was responsible for the game's soundtrack and produced it in 5.1 surround with the Brandenburg State Orchestra in Frankfurt (Oder) under the direction of Bernd Ruf.

== Reception ==
Reception

Aggregate score
Aggregator	Score
Metacritic	79/100

Review scores
Publication	Score
1Up.com	B+
4Players	88%
Eurogamer	7/10
GameSpot	7.6/10
GameSpy	4/5
IGN	8.2
Jeuxvideo.com	16/20

Anno 1701 received "generally favorable reviews" according to the aggregate review site Metacritic.

=== Sales ===
As Anno 1602 and Anno 1503 had been commercial hits, together totaling 4.5 million units sold worldwide, pre-release sales estimates for Anno 1701 were high. Retailers purchased 450,000 units in Germany in preparation for the game's launch; worldwide pre-orders from stores reached roughly 1 million copies. According to Der Spiegel, the game and its predecessors were aimed at mainstream casual players who "buy a game once a year and spend weeks with it", a goal reflected in the new title's pre-release television advertising. Publisher Sunflowers Interactive noted a high percentage of female players among the Anno series' fanbase, and they were a target demographic for Anno 1701.

Upon release, Anno 1701 broke sales records to become the fastest-selling German computer game ever, with more than 200,000 units sold in German-speaking countries during its debut two weeks. In response, Sunflowers forecast 500,000 sales by the end of 2006. It ultimately finished the year with sales of 320,000 copies in the German market alone, for revenues of €12.7 million. This placed it second for 2006, behind World of Warcraft at 345,000 units.

== The Sunken Dragon ==
In March 2007, Sunflowers released an add-on called Anno 1701: The Sunken Dragon. It includes new features, new missions, and a map editor. The add-on has an Asiatic look, as well as a campaign with 11 missions centered on the new player profiles.
