= Dynamedion =

German music composition and production company

Dynamedion GbR
- Company type: Private
- Industry: Music industry
- Founded: 2000; 26 years ago
- Founders: Pierre Langer; Tilman Sillescu
- Headquarters: Mainz, Germany
- Key people: Pierre Langer (managing director); Tilman Sillescu (lead composer, creative director)
- Number of employees: 45 (2017)
- Subsidiaries: Boom Library
- Website: dynamedion.com

Dynamedion GbR is a German music composition and production company based in Mainz. Founded in 2000 by composers Pierre Langer and Tilman Sillescu, Dynamedion specialises in composing music for video games. The group has won several industry awards, including Best German Soundtrack in 2004, 2005 and 2007 at the German Game Developers Awards, and Best Main Theme 2007 at the GANG Awards.

== History ==
Dynamedion's founders, Pierre Langer and Tilman Sillescu, both composers with a Bachelor of Musical Arts, Arranging and Composing degree, met while employed as teachers at the Universität Mainz. The two wanted to expand their creative abilities, leading Langer to suggest creating music for video games. The duo experimented with several minor projects before founding Dynamedion in 2000. The company started out developing a game in Adobe Flash, but dropped its development when approached by Volker Wertich, who asked them to work on his then-upcoming game, SpellForce: The Order of Dawn. In 2009, the company launched Boom Library, a subsidiary company that creates original sound effects.

== Works ==
Year	Title	Ref.
2003	SpellForce: The Order of Dawn	
2006	SpellForce 2: Shadow Wars	
2006	ParaWorld	
2007	Stranglehold	
2008	Drakensang: The Dark Eye	
2008	Mortal Kombat vs. DC Universe	
2008	Sacred 2: Fallen Angel	
2009	BattleForge	
2009	Anno 1404	
2009	Runes of Magic	
2010	Toy Story 3: The Video Game	
2010	Kane & Lynch 2: Dog Days	
2010	Arcania: Gothic 4	
2010	Kinectimals	
2011	Crysis 2	
2011	Anno 2070	
2012	Kinect Rush: A Disney–Pixar Adventure	
2012	Kinect Star Wars	
2012	Blade & Soul	
2012	Hitman: Absolution	
2012	Tian Xia III	
2013	Dragon's Prophet	
2013	Monster Hunter Online	
2013	Age of Gunslingers	
2013	Total War: Rome II	
2013	Ryse: Son of Rome	
2014	Sacred 3	
2014	Risen 3: Titan Lords	
2014	Lords of the Fallen	
2014	Iron Knight	
2014	Monopoly Plus	
2015	Total War: Attila	
2015	Mortal Kombat X	
2015	Anno 2205	
2015	Demon Seals	
2015	Total War Battles: Kingdom	
2016	Hitman	
2016	Total War: Warhammer	
2016	Heroes of Incredible Tales	
2016	Champions of Anteria	
2016	The Lion's Song	
2017	Injustice 2	
2017	Total War: Warhammer II	
2017	Zoo Tycoon: Ultimate Animal Collection	
2018	Total War: Arena	
2018	Legend: Rising Empire	
2018	Hitman 2	
2019	Anno 1800	
2019	Mortal Kombat 11	
2019	Tropico 6	
2023	In the Blind Spot	
2025	Anno 117: Pax Romana	
