= Easter egg (media) =

Something hidden within a work

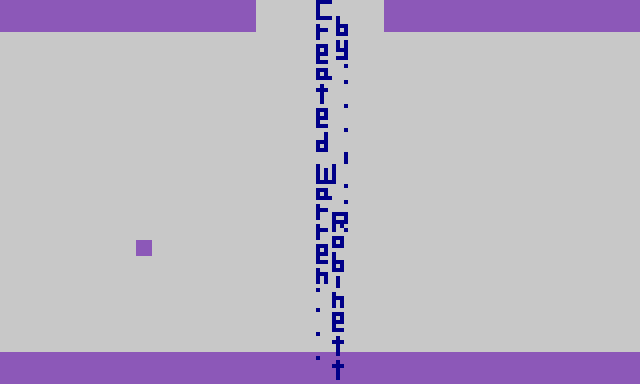
The secret room in Adventure with Warren Robinett's credit. Adventure is typically regarded as one of the first video games to feature an Easter egg.

An Easter egg is a message, image, or feature hidden in software, a video game, a film, or another—usually electronic—medium. The term used in this manner was coined around 1980 by Steve Wright, the then-Director of Software Development in the Atari Consumer Division, to describe a hidden message in the Atari video game Adventure, in reference to an Easter egg hunt.

The earliest known video game Easter egg is in the 1973 video game Moonlander, in which the player tries to land a lunar module on the Moon; if the player opts to fly the module horizontally through several of the game's screens, they encounter a McDonald's restaurant, and if they land next to it, the astronaut will visit it instead of standing next to the ship. The earliest known Easter egg in software in general is one placed in the "make" command for PDP-6/PDP-10 computers sometime in October 1967–October 1968, where if the user attempts to create a file named "love" by typing "make love", the program responds "not war?" before proceeding.

== Origin ==
The use of the term "Easter egg" to describe secret features in video games originates from the 1980 video game Adventure for the Atari 2600 game console, programmed by the employee Warren Robinett. At the time, Atari did not include programmers' names in the game credits, both to prevent competitors from poaching its developers as well as to deny developers a means to bargain with the management of the new owners, Warner Communications. Robinett, who disagreed with his supervisor over this lack of acknowledgment, secretly programmed the message "Created by Warren Robinett" to appear only if a player moves their avatar over a specific pixel (dubbed the "Gray Dot") during a certain part of the game and enters a previously "forbidden" part of the map where the message can be found. When Robinett left Atari, he did not inform the company of the acknowledgment that he included in the game. Shortly after his departure, the "Gray Dot" and his message were discovered by a player. Atari's management initially wanted to remove the message and release the game again, until this was deemed too costly. Instead, Steve Wright, the Director of Software Development in the Atari Consumer Division, suggested that they keep the message and, in fact, encourage the inclusion of such messages in future games, describing them as Easter eggs for consumers to find.

== In video games ==
While Robinett's message in Adventure led to the first use of the phrase "Easter egg", Easter eggs were included in previous video games. The earliest known video game Easter egg is in Moonlander (1973), in which the player tries to land a spaceship on the Moon. If the player flies far enough horizontally, they encounter a McDonald's restaurant, and if they land next to it, an astronaut will visit it instead of standing next to the ship. Other early known Easter eggs include one in the first text adventure game, Colossal Cave Adventure (1976), from which Adventure was fashioned, which includes several secret words. One of these is "xyzzy", a command which enables the player to move between two points in the game world. According to research by Ed Fries, one of the earliest Easter eggs in a graphical video games could be found in Starship 1 (1977), programmed by Ron Milner. By triggering the cabinet's controls in the right order, the player can have the message "Hi Ron!" appear on the screen. Fries describes it as "the earliest arcade game yet known that clearly meets the definition of an Easter egg". The existence of this Easter egg was not published until 2017, leading Fries to suggest that, as more than one hundred arcade games predate Starship 1, earlier Easter eggs may still be undiscovered. Fries says that some Atari arcade cabinets were resold under the Kee Games label and include changes to the hardware that make the game appear different from the Atari version. Anti-Aircraft II (1975) includes a means to modify the circuit board to make the airplanes in the game appear as alien UFOs. Fries surmises that this feature may have been intended for a Kee Games release. For this reason, and because it requires a hardware modification, Fries questions whether it meets the definition of an Easter egg. Multiple games released for the Fairchild Channel F, including Video Whizball (1978), were also have found to have Easter eggs put in place by programmers Bradley Reid-Selth and Micheal K. Glass.

Since Adventure, there has been a long history of video game developers placing Easter eggs in their games. Most Easter eggs are intentional—an attempt to communicate with the player or a way of getting even with management for a perceived slight. Easter eggs in video games take a variety of forms, from purely ornamental screens to aesthetic enhancements that change some element of the game during play. The Easter egg included in the original Age of Empires (1997) is an example of the latter; catapult projectiles are changed from stones to cows.

More elaborate Easter eggs include secret levels and developers' rooms—fully functional, hidden areas of the game. Developers' rooms often include inside jokes from the fandom or development team and differ from a debug room in that they are specifically intended for the player to find. Some games even include hidden minigames as Easter eggs. In the LucasArts game Day of the Tentacle (1993), the original Maniac Mansion (1987) game can be played in its full version by using a home computer in a character's room. Similarly, a programmer included the whole of TimeSplitters 2 (2002) within Homefront: The Revolution (2016), accessed by using a special code at an in-game arcade cabinet.

Other Easter eggs originated unintentionally. The Konami Code, a type of cheat code, became an intentional Easter egg in most games, but it originated from Konami's Gradius (1985) for the Nintendo Entertainment System. The programmer, Kazuhisa Hashimoto, created the code as a means to rapidly debug the game by giving the player's avatar additional health and powers to easily traverse the game. These types of codes are normally removed from the game before it is shipped but, in the case of Gradius, Hashimoto forgot to remove it and the code was soon discovered by players. Its popularity inspired Konami to reuse the code and purposely retain it for many of its future games as an Easter egg.

Technical issues may also create unintentional Easter eggs. Jon Burton, founder of Traveller's Tales, said that many seemingly apparent Easter eggs in their Sega Genesis games came about as a result of introducing programming tricks to get around some of the difficulty they had in getting Sega's strict certification for their games, catching any exceptions during execution to bring the game back to a usable state as to pass certification. For example, hitting the side of the Sonic 3D Blast (1996) cartridge while it is slotted in the console will bring the game back to the Level Select screen, which Burton explains is the default exception handling for any unidentified processor error, such as when connectivity between the cartridge and the console's microprocessor is temporarily lost.

== In computing ==
=== Software ===
In computer software, Easter eggs are secret responses that occur as a result of an undocumented set of commands. The results can vary from a simple printed message or image to a page of programmer credits or a small video game hidden inside an otherwise serious piece of software.

In the TOPS-10 operating system (for the DEC PDP-10 mainframe computer), the make command is used to invoke the TECO editor to create a file. If given the file name argument love, so that the command reads make love, it will pause and respond not war? before creating the file. The Easter egg was added sometime between October 1967 and October 1968 by William F. Weiher at the Stanford AI Lab to the COMPIL program for the PDP-6, which was then used in the TOPS-10 operating system, making it the first Easter egg in a software program. This same behavior occurs on the RSTS/E operating system, where TECO will provide this response. Other Unix operating systems respond to "why" with "why not" (a reference to The Prisoner in Berkeley Unix, 1977).

Some versions of the DEC OpenVMS operating system have concealed exit status codes, including a reference to the Monty Python Dirty Hungarian Phrasebook skit; "exit %xb70" returns the message "%SYSTEM-W-FISH, my hovercraft is full of eels" while "exit %x34b4" returns a reference to an early Internet meme: "%SYSTEM-F-GAMEOVER, All your base are belong to us".

Easter eggs in the 1997 version of Microsoft Office include a hidden flight simulator in Microsoft Excel and a pinball game in Microsoft Word. Since 2002, Microsoft does not allow any hidden or undocumented code as part of its trustworthy computing initiative.

The Debian operating system's package tool apt-get has an Easter egg involving an ASCII cow when variants on apt-get moo are typed into the shell.

Animation showing Easter eggs in Google's Android operating system

An Easter egg is found on all Microsoft Windows operating systems before XP. In the 3D Text screen saver, entering the text "volcano" will display the names of all the volcanoes in the United States. Microsoft removed this Easter egg in XP but added others. In Windows Vista and later, by launching a screensaver executable (introduced with Windows Vista) on the command line with the /p65552 flag, for example launching the "bubbles" screen saver with bubbles.scr /p65552 command-line parameter, it runs as desktop wallpaper. Microsoft Excel 95 contains a hidden minigame called The Hall of Tortured Souls, which consists of a small explorable 3D room in a visual style similar to Doom (1993). The names of the Excel's programmers are written on the room's walls.

The Google search engine famously contains many Easter eggs, given to the user in response to certain search queries.

Steve Jobs banned Easter eggs from Apple products upon his return to the company. The first Easter egg to appear after his death is in a 2012 update to the Mac App Store for OS X Mountain Lion, in which downloaded apps are temporarily timestamped as "24 January 1984", the date of the sales launch of the original Macintosh.

The Python programming language and its ecosystem of libraries include various Easter eggs.

=== Firmware ===
While computer-related Easter eggs are often found in installed software, occasionally they exist in the firmware of certain devices. On some home and early personal computers the ROM contains Easter eggs, including lists of the developers' names, political exhortations, snatches of music, or images of the entire development team.

The palmtop PC HP 200LX (1994) includes an undocumented hex calculator HEXCALC.EXM. The built-in maze game "Lair of Squid" incorporates a hidden gallery of the software developers. In test mode it displays several poems.

Other notable examples include some versions of the AMI BIOS that on 13 November 1993, proceeded to play "Happy Birthday" via the PC speaker repeatedly instead of booting, as well as several early Apple Macintosh models that have photos of the development team in the ROM. These Mac Easter eggs were well-publicized in the Macintosh press at the time along with the means to access them, and were later recovered by an NYC Resistor team, a hacker collective, through elaborate reverse engineering. Similarly, the Radio Shack Color Computer 3's ROM contains code which displays what looks like three Microware developers on a Ctrl+Alt+Reset keypress sequence—a hard reset which discards any information currently in RAM.

Several oscilloscopes contain Easter eggs. One example is the HP 54600B, known to have a Tetris (1985) clone, and the HP 54622D contains an imitation of the Asteroids (1979) game named Rocks. Another is the Tektronix 1755A Vector and Waveform Monitor which displays swimming fish when Remote > Software version is selected on the CONFIG menu.

In the second and third hardware revision of the Minolta Dynax/Maxxum/Alpha 9 (introduced in 1998) SLR camera, including all SSM/ADI upgraded bodies (since 2003), an undocumented button sequence can be utilized to reconfigure the camera to behave like the Dynax/Maxxum/Alpha 9Ti (1999) and subsequently invoke support for the limited model's extra functions also in the black model.

One of HP's electronic pocket calculators, the HP-45 (introduced in 1973), has a built-in undocumented stopwatch.

The firmware of HP's ScanJet 5p image scanner contains an Easter egg wherein, on a cold power-on, holding down the scan button when the SCSI ID selector on the back is set to "0" will cause the ScanJet to play a rendition of Schiller's "Ode to Joy", by modulating the speed of the audible stepper motor drive to produce specific pitches.

=== Hardware ===
The Commodore Amiga 1000 computer includes the signatures of the design and development team embossed on the inside of the case, including Jay Miner and the paw print of his dog, Mitchy. The Commodore Amiga models 500, 600, and 1200 each feature Easter eggs in the form of song titles by the B-52's as white printing on the motherboards. The 500 says "B52/Rock Lobster", the 600 says "June Bug", and the 1200 says "Channel Z". The Amiga OS software contains hidden messages.

Many integrated circuit (chip) designers have included hidden graphics elements termed chip art, including images, phrases, developer initials, logos, and more. This artwork, like the rest of the chip, is reproduced in each copy by photolithography and etching. These are visible only when the chip package is opened and examined under magnification. The 1984 CVAX microchip implementation of the MicroVAX CPU contains in its etchings the Russian phrase in the Cyrillic alphabet "VAX: When you care enough to steal the very best", placed there because, "knowing that some CVAXs would end up in the USSR, the team wanted the Russians to know that we were thinking of them".

Another notable example is the pro controller for the Nintendo Switch, on the controller's motherboard, if a player holds down on the right stick and looks closely into the transparent plastic surrounding its socket while shining a light on it, there is a hidden message that reads "THX2ALLGAMEFANS!". The message was discovered by Japanese Twitter user Geo Stream on March 4, 2017, one day after the Switch's launch.

== Comics ==
American comic book artists are known to include hidden messages in their art:

- In a reprint of classic Captain America comics, a production artist drew a penis on Bucky Barnes.
- In 2000, Al Milgrom inserted a message into Universe X: Spidey #1 insulting his previous boss, Marvel Editor in Chief Bob Harras, following Harras' termination from Marvel Comics. On Page 28, panel 3, the spines of books on a bookshelf in the background read, "HARRAS HA HA, HE'S GONE, GOOD RIDDANCE TO BAD RUBBISH HE WAS A NASTY S.O.B." The message was spotted after the book was printed but before it went on sale; the copies that were printed for consumers were destroyed. However, 4,000 preview copies were distributed to retailers as part of a "First Look" deal, and these are today considered rare collector's items. Milgrom was "apparently fired and allegedly (and quietly) re-hired several weeks later".
- Ethan Van Sciver hid the word "sex" in the background of nearly every page of New X-Men #118 (November 2001). Van Sciver subsequently stated that he hid the word throughout the book because he was annoyed with Marvel at the time for reasons he cannot remember, and thought it would be fun to engage in some mischief with his work.
- Indonesian artist Ardian Syaf is known to engage in the practice of hiding Easter egg references to political figures in the backgrounds of his artwork. In Batgirl (vol. 4) #9 (July 2012), Syaf included a storefront sign that referenced the President of Indonesia, Joko Widodo, although the text that accompanies the image of Widodo is covered by a caption. In April 2017, he caused an outcry by placing Easter egg references to the November 2016 Jakarta protests into the pages of X-Men Gold #1, which were perceived by readers to be antisemitic and anti-Christian. Though Syaf acknowledged the political nature of the messages, he stated that they were not intended to express any antisemitic nor anti-Christian sentiment on his part. In response to these Easter eggs, Marvel terminated their contract with Syaf.

== Video ==
=== Home media ===
Easter eggs are found on films, DVDs, and Blu-ray Discs, often as deleted scenes or bonus features. Klinger states that their presence is "another signifier of artistry in the world of DVD supplements." According to American film critics James Berardinelli and Roger Ebert, most DVDs do not contain them and most examples are "inconsequential", but a few, such as the one found on the Memento DVD release, are "worth the effort to seek out".

=== Broadcast media ===
Unlike DVDs and computer games, broadcast radio and television programs contain no executable code. Easter eggs may still appear in the content itself, such as a hidden Mickey in a Disney film or a real telephone number instead of a 555 fictitious telephone number. A 2014 Super Bowl advertisement was leaked online in which a lady gives a man a real telephone number, which the advertiser had hidden as a marketing ploy; the first caller to the number received a pair of tickets to the game. The 1980s animated series She-Ra: Princess of Power featured a character named Loo-Kee who typically appeared once per episode, hidden in a single screenshot. At the end of the episode, the screenshot would be shown again and Loo-Kee would challenge viewers to locate him before revealing his hiding place. Adventure Time also had a character known as The Snail that was hidden in almost every episode of the show.

More recent broadcast media, where viewers have access to high-resolution digital copies or streaming services, may include further Easter eggs that can only be found by freezing the show at certain points. In the anthology series Black Mirror, the producers have included Easter eggs that reference past episodes, or tie into future episodes, as a means of loosely tying together all episodes into a single Black Mirror universe. The opening credits of Season 2 of the animated series Arcane: League of Legends feature Easter eggs that foreshadows the episode. They generally could only be found by pausing the sequence at certain points. Consequently, the introductions to each episode of the season slightly differ from each other. The Netflix series Stranger Things had a real-world Easter Egg where a pizza delivery van featured in the show's fourth season had the phone number (805) 45-PIZZA shown on its side. If that number, which translated to 805-457-4992 was dialed, it led to a special message from Argyle, the fictional restaurant's delivery driver.

== Security concerns ==
Security author Michel E. Kabay discussed security concerns of Easter eggs in 2000, saying that, while software quality assurance requires that all code be tested, it is not known whether Easter eggs are. He said that, as they tend to be held as programming secrets from the rest of the product testing process, a "logic bomb" could also bypass testing. Kabay asserts that this undermined the Trusted Computing Base, a paradigm of trustworthy hardware and software in place since the 1980s, and is of concern wherever personal or confidential information is stored, as this may then be vulnerable to damage or manipulation. Microsoft created some of the largest and most elaborate Easter eggs, such as those in Microsoft Office. In 2005, Larry Osterman of Microsoft acknowledged Microsoft Easter eggs, and his involvement in development of one, but described them as "irresponsible", and wrote that the company's operating system division "has a 'no Easter Eggs' policy" as part of its Trustworthy Computing initiative.

In 2006, Douglas W. Jones said that while "some Easter eggs may be intentional tools used to detect illegal copying, others are clearly examples of unauthorized functionality that has slipped through the quality-control tests at the vendor". While hidden Easter eggs themselves are harmless, it may be possible for malware to be hidden in similar ways in voting machines or other computers.

Netscape Navigator contributor Jamie Zawinski stated in an interview in 1998 that harmless Easter eggs impose a negligible burden on shipped software, and serve the important purpose of helping productivity by keeping programmers happy.

== Contemporary works about Easter eggs ==
Easter eggs have become more widely known to the general public and are referenced in contemporary fiction and artworks.

- In the Doctor Who episode "Blink", the existence of video Easter eggs across seventeen DVDs leads to solving the protagonists' dilemma.
- In Ernest Cline's novel Ready Player One and its film adaptation, the protagonists are competing with others to find various Easter eggs within a large virtual reality environment. The final challenge includes identifying and reaching the Easter egg from the Atari Adventure game.

== See also ==
- Acrostic – Text formed from parts of another text
- Hacking of consumer electronics
- Hidden track – Music not detectable by casual listeners
- Konami Code – a secret code, originally from the game Contra, that has gained widespread adoption as an Easter egg
- List of Easter eggs in Microsoft products
- List of filmmaker's signatures
- List of Google Easter eggs
- List of Easter eggs in Tesla products
- Magic string – Input which activates otherwise hidden functionality
- Rickrolling – Internet meme and prank
- The Book of Mozilla
- Undocumented feature – Aspect of computer hardware or software
- Al Hirschfeld § Nina
