= Anno 1800 =

2019 video game

- Developer: Ubisoft Blue Byte
- Publisher: Ubisoft
- Director: Dirk Riegert
- Producers: Christoph Knauz; Nadin Bernstorff
- Designers: Jan Dungel; Volker Sassen
- Programmers: Kevin Zellner; Thomas Stein
- Artist: Sebastian Steinberg
- Writer: Matt Cook
- Composer: Dynamedion
- Series: Anno
- Platforms: Windows; PlayStation 5; Xbox Series X/S
- Release: Windows; April 16, 2019; PS5, Xbox Series X/S; March 16, 2023
- Genres: City-building, real-time strategy
- Modes: Single-player, multiplayer

Anno 1800 is a city-building real-time strategy video game, developed by Ubisoft Blue Byte and published by Ubisoft, and launched on April 16, 2019. It is the seventh game in the Anno series, and returns to the use of a historical setting, following the previous futuristic titles Anno 2070 and Anno 2205, taking place during the Industrial Revolution in the 19th century. Following the previous installment, the game returns to the series' traditional city-building and ocean combat mechanics, but introduces new aspects of gameplay, such as tourism, blueprinting, and the effects of industrialisation influences on island inhabitants.

== Overview ==
Anno 1800 takes place in the 19th century at the dawn of the Industrial Age. Like other Anno games, Anno 1800 is a city-building and strategy game. While it is set in the context of colonial trade, the featured architecture is Victorian era and the economic engine is factory labour. The core gameplay of Anno 1800 takes place in the Old World, where the needs of the citizens, workers and artisans are central to the management of production and supply chains. A parallel New World city exists, which produces products that laborers in the Old World want to purchase, thus trade routes need to be established. Unlike its colonial 18th century predecessor Anno 1701, the game has a blueprint feature that helps the player to plan out the city.

The game also features a story campaign, a sandbox mode, and multiplayer mode. Like Anno 2205, the game features multisession gameplay, though unlike its predecessor, combat and city-building sessions are not separated. Anno 1800 integrates into a classic city-building game featuring randomly generated maps and trade routes, artificial intelligence (AI) opponents that build on the same map as the player, and naval warfare.

The attractiveness rating of Anno 1800 grapples with the impact of industrialization on the population. With every factory the city's attractiveness rating falls and the rating of the area around an emerging industrial zone is also affected. Tourists contribute to the city's income and will flock to natural land, local festivities, and various decorative ornaments, but dislike pollution, local unrest, and noisy or smelly industry.

The blueprint mode of Anno 1800 is one of the new additions to the series. It helps the player by allowing them to plan out their city with silhouetted blueprint buildings, without immediately spending valuable resources on actually constructing them. If a player has insufficient resources the blueprint building can be placed on the city map for later construction. Once planning is done and the necessary resources are gathered, each blueprint building can be built with a single click.

=== Downloadable content ===
The Anno 1800 Season 1 pass for paid-for downloadable content (DLC) includes the three DLC packs Sunken Treasure, Botanica and The Passage. While in Botanica Botanical Gardens can be built to increase city attractiveness, The Passage allows the player to sail the Northwest Passage on the way to the Arctic Circle. Sunken Treasure offers a new map with a huge island on which the player can build a gigantic city, and special items to boost their industry to sustain that city.

In 2020, Season 2 introduced a further three DLC packs. Seat of Power lets the player choose which policies will influence the settlements in the vicinity of a palace. The Bright Harvest DLC introduces tractors and workforce reduction. In Land of Lions the player travels to a region inspired by the Horn of Africa, known as Enbesa, navigate social class and build an irrigation system to counter water shortage.

In 2021, Season 3 introduced three more DLCs. Docklands allows the player to turn their city into a global trade hub with a modular warehouse system and use trade contracts to create a monopoly on player's favorite goods. Tourist Season introduces the new Tourist resident tier to city's hotels and keep them entertained with restaurants and bus tours of hotspots. The High Life implements the construction of the first skyscrapers helping keep investors happy with shopping malls and the construction of the game's biggest monument, the Skyline Tower.

In 2022, Season 4 saw the release of a further three DLCs. Seeds of Change focused on bringing Haciendas to the New World, Empire of the Skies brought rigid airships and mail service to the game. New World Rising introduced a new tier of population, the Artistas, who require new and changeling production chains, such as fans and scooters. These DLCs focused more on the New World, in contrast to Season 3 which was more focused on the Old World. In addition, these three DLCs each came with their own custom scenario, each containing new challenges and unique gameplay experiences.

In addition to the 4 seasons, Anno 1800 had many minor cosmetic DLC that added new skins for buildings or decorative ornaments.

== Distribution ==
Anno 1800 is available on Steam, Epic Games Store, Origin, and Ubisoft Connect. It was originally also available for pre-purchase on Steam, but was pulled from Steam when it officially launched. In December 2022, Anno 1800 was reinstated on Steam. A console version for PlayStation 5 and Xbox Series X/S was released on March 16, 2023.

== Reception ==
Reception

Aggregate scores
Aggregator	Score
Metacritic	(PC) 81/100 (Note: Based on 49 reviews) (PS5) 83/100 (Note: Based on 11 reviews) (XSXS) 78/100 (Note: Based on 4 reviews)
OpenCritic	95% recommend

Review scores
Publication	Score
GameRevolution	4.5/5
GameSpot	7/10
GameStar	90/100
IGN	8.1/10
PC Games (DE)	9/10

Anno 1800 received "generally favorable" reviews (Note: The console versions were released as Anno 1800 Console Edition, listed separately on Metacritic but combined on OpenCritic.) according to review aggregator website Metacritic. As per OpenCritic, 95% of the 63 critic reviews recommend it. The title became the fastest-selling Anno game, selling four times more copies than Anno 2205 achieved during its first week of release.

=== Awards ===
Year	Award	Category	Result	Ref.
2018	Gamescom	Best Simulation Game	Nominated	
2018	Gamescom	Best Strategy Game	Nominated	
2018	Gamescom	Best PC Game	Won	
2019	Deutscher Entwicklerpreis	Best German Game	Won	
2019	Deutscher Entwicklerpreis	Best Game Design	Won	
2019	Deutscher Entwicklerpreis	Best Graphics	Won	
2019	Deutscher Entwicklerpreis	Best Sound	Won	
2019	2019 Golden Joystick Awards	PC Game of the Year	Nominated	
2019	The Game Awards 2019	Best Strategy Game	Nominated	
2020	23rd Annual D.I.C.E. Awards	Strategy/Simulation Game of the Year	Nominated	
2020	Deutscher Computerspielpreis	Best German Game	Won	
2020	Deutscher Computerspielpreis	Best Game Design	Won	
2020	Deutscher Computerspielpreis	Best Expert Game (Note: "Expert Game" (translated from the German "Expertenspiel") refers to games for specific audiences and interests, focusing on complexity and depth, such as simulations or strategy games.)	Nominated	
