= Life (video games) =

Play turn of a character in a game

An example of a life system. The character has a total of three lives, indicated as light-blue orbs, and has currently lost 3.5 out of 11 hit points, indicated as red hearts – losing all would cost a life.

In video games, a life is a play-turn that a player character has, defined as the period between start and end of play. Lives refer to a finite number of tries before the game ends with a game over. Sometimes the euphemisms chance, try, rest and continue are used, particularly in all-ages games, to avoid the morbid insinuation of losing one's "life". Generally, if the player loses all their health, they lose a life. Losing all lives usually grants the player character "game over", forcing them to either restart or stop playing.

The number of lives a player is granted varies per game type. A finite number of lives became a common feature in arcade games and action games during the 1980s, and mechanics such as checkpoints and power-ups made the managing of lives a more strategic experience for players over time. Lives give novice players more chances to learn the mechanics of a video game, while allowing more advanced players to take more risks.

== History ==
Lives may have originated from the pinball mechanic of having a limited number of balls. A finite number of lives (usually three) became a common feature in arcade games. The number of lives usually displayed on the screen (in arcade games, the character that is being played is also counted as a "life"). Much like in pinball games, the player's goal was usually to score as many points as possible with their limited number of lives. Taito's classic arcade video game Space Invaders (1978) is usually credited with introducing multiple lives to video games. Lives were important in these games because the desire to avoid the finality of the player character's death compelled players to insert more quarters, making the maximum amount of profit.

Later, refinements of health, defense and other attributes, as well as power-ups, made managing the player character's life a more strategic experience and made lost health less of the handicap it was in early arcade games. Lives and game over screens became thought of as outmoded concepts and holdovers from arcade games that were unnecessary when players had already paid for the game. They also discouraged the player from playing the game fairly, with players in games such as Doom resorting to save scumming in order to preserve their lives rather than start from an in-game checkpoint with their lives depleted, and getting a game over can often cause players to permanently abandon a game instead of making another attempt at the level. Therefore, most modern games have completely abandoned the concept of player lives, instead simply restarting the player from the nearest checkpoint when they die, allowing them to undo or rewind their progress until such time as they are safe, as in Prince of Persia: The Sands of Time, or making saving the player from death contingent on successfully executing a QTE, as in Batman: Arkham Asylum.

== Usage ==
It is common in action games for the player to have multiple lives and chances to earn more in-game. This way, a player can recover from making a disastrous mistake. Role-playing games and adventure games usually grant only one, but allow player-characters to reload a saved game.

Lives set up the situation where dying is not necessarily the end of the game, allowing the player to take risks they might not take otherwise, or experiment with different strategies to find one that works. Multiple lives also allow novice players a chance to learn a game's mechanics before the game is over. Another reason to implement lives is that the ability to earn extra lives provide an additional reward incentive for the player.

The way lives are shown varies from game to game. While pinball games often use an increasing counter ("Ball 1", "Ball 2", "Ball 3"), most other types of games with a lives system display a number of lives remaining. A particular variation is in whether the displayed number of lives includes the one currently being used, hence whether the game ends immediately when the life counter reaches zero or the player still has one chance left.

Many older video games feature cheat codes that allow the player to gain extra lives without earning them throughout gameplay. One example is Contra, which added the option to input the Konami code to get 30 extra lives.

In modern times, some free-to-play games, such as the Candy Crush Saga trilogy, capitalize on the multiple life system to create an opportunity to earn more microtransactions. In such games, a life is lost when the player fails a level, but once all lives are lost, the player is prevented from continuing the game for a temporary amount of time, instead of receiving a game over that would entail total failure or require a new beginning, as lives will re-generate automatically after a number of minutes or hours. Players can either wait for lives, attempt alternate activities to recover lives (such as asking for friends online to donate lives), or purchase items that can fully replenish lives or grant unlimited lives for a limited time to continue playing immediately. This system works like an "energy" meter for other free-to-play games, however, lives do not deplete when a level is successfully completed, unlike energy.

=== Extra lives ===
An 1-Up Mushroom from the Super Mario series

An extra life or a 1-up is a video game item that increments the player character's number of lives. Because there are no universal game rules, the form 1-ups take varies from game to game, but are often rare and difficult items to acquire. The use of the term "1-up" to designate an extra life first appeared in Super Mario Bros., where a 1-Up could be obtained in several ways, including grabbing a green "1-Up Mushroom", collecting 100 coins, using a Koopa shell to kill eight or more consecutive enemies, and jumping on eight or more consecutive enemies without touching the ground. The term quickly caught on, seeing use in both home and arcade video games.

A number of games included an exploitable design flaw called a "1-up loop", in which it is possible to consistently acquire two or more 1-ups between a certain checkpoint and the following checkpoint. The player can thus acquire two 1-ups, make the character die, and restart from the first checkpoint with a net gain of one life; this procedure can then be repeated for as many lives as the player desires.
