= The Lion's Song =

2016 episodic adventure video game

- Developer: Mi'pu'mi Games
- Publisher: Mi'pu'mi Games
- Designer: Stefan Srb
- Composer: Dynamedion
- Engine: Molecule Engine
- Platforms: Windows; macOS; Linux; iOS; Android; Nintendo Switch
- Release: Episode 1; 7 July 2016; Full season; 13 July 2017; Nintendo Switch; 10 July 2018
- Genre: Point-and-click adventure
- Mode: Single-player

The Lion's Song is an episodic point-and-click adventure game developed and published by Austrian studio Mi'pu'mi Games. The first of its four episodes was released in July 2016, with the complete season following in July 2017 and a Nintendo Switch version in July 2018. Set primarily in Vienna in the early 20th century, the game follows fictional artists and intellectuals struggling with creativity, ambition and social expectations. Player choices create connections between the four stories and can alter details in later episodes.

The game originated as a personal game jam project by Austrian designer Stefan Srb, who developed its original story for Ludum Dare in 2014. After the prototype attracted a positive response, Srb's employer Mi'pu'mi expanded it into a commercial production involving around ten developers. Critics generally praised the game's writing, historical setting, sepia-toned pixel art, music and representations of the creative process, while its limited interactivity and the effectiveness of its final episode received a more mixed response. The Lion's Song won Best Indie Game at the 2016 Deutscher Entwicklerpreis and received an honorable mention for Excellence in Narrative at the 2017 Independent Games Festival.

== Gameplay and premise ==
The Lion's Song is a narrative point-and-click adventure divided into four episodes. Interaction consists primarily of examining locations, selecting objects and choosing responses in conversations rather than collecting an inventory or solving traditional adventure-game puzzles. Decisions made in one story can affect details in others, while recurring people, locations and events establish relationships between the otherwise self-contained episodes.

The first episode, Silence, follows Wilma Dörfl, a young composer who is sent by her mentor to an isolated cabin in the Alps after struggling to complete an important composition. During a storm she begins drawing musical ideas from the sounds around her, while her conversations and anxieties influence the work she eventually names "The Lion's Song". The second episode, Anthology, follows the painter Franz Markert in Vienna. Franz perceives aspects of other people's personalities as visual "layers" and attempts to capture them in his portraits, encountering figures including Gustav Klimt and Sigmund Freud as he also struggles to understand himself.

The third episode, Derivation, centres on mathematician Emma Recniczek, whose opportunities are restricted because she is a woman. She assumes the male identity "Emil Schell" to gain access to a circle of established mathematicians. The final episode, Closure, takes place largely aboard a train and links the earlier characters and their acquaintances while placing their lives in the broader historical context of the approaching First World War.

After each episode, the game displays how the player's major decisions compare with those made by other players. Choices can subsequently be revisited without restarting the entire game. A "Connections Gallery" records links discovered between the four episodes, including consequences and encounters that vary depending on earlier decisions.

== Development and release ==
Stefan Srb created the original version of The Lion's Song under the name "Leafthief" as an entry for Ludum Dare 30 in August 2014. At the time, Srb worked professionally as a game designer at Vienna-based Mi'pu'mi Games but developed smaller games independently in his spare time. The prototype contained the basis of what later became Silence, focusing on a composer attempting to find inspiration while isolated in an Alpine cabin.

After receiving a positive response to the prototype, Srb presented the project to Mi'pu'mi. The studio agreed to develop it commercially, transforming what had been a one-person project into a production involving around ten people. Mi'pu'mi took responsibility for areas including project management, distribution, marketing and localization, while the scope expanded beyond Wilma's story to include the painter Franz and mathematician Emma. Austrian broadcaster FM4 described the project during development as an expansion of Srb's original game-jam work into an official Mi'pu'mi title with several protagonists.

The expansion also changed how the stories were conceived. Rather than presenting creative success as an isolated achievement, the episodes increasingly connected their protagonists through Vienna's artistic, scientific and social circles. Die Presse noted that the game's Austrian setting was unusual within the medium and interpreted the expansion as a way of presenting the cultural world of turn-of-the-century Austria through interactivity rather than simply describing it.

The first episode, Silence, was released on 7 July 2016. Mi'pu'mi released the remaining episodes over the following year, completing the season with Closure on 13 July 2017; the complete game was also released for mobile devices. The Nintendo Switch version, containing all four episodes, followed on 10 July 2018. The game's score was produced by German music company Dynamedion.

== Reception ==
Reception

Aggregate scores
| Aggregator | Score |
|---|---|
| Metacritic | 77/100 (PC); 81/100 (NS) |
| OpenCritic | 77% |

Review scores
| Publication | Score |
|---|---|
| Destructoid | 8.5/10 |
| GamesBeat | 9/10 |
| GameStar | 83/100 |
| Nintendo Life | 8/10 |
| GameCritics | 8/10 |
| Gamekult | 7/10 |
| Adventure Gamers | 3/5 |

According to Metacritic, The Lion's Song received "generally favorable" reviews, with an aggregate score of 77 out of 100 for the PC version and 81 for the Nintendo Switch release. OpenCritic reported an average score of 81 out of 100, with 77% of critics recommending the game.

Manuel Fritsch of GameStar praised its treatment of its protagonists' emotions and anxieties and the way their creative and intellectual processes were represented through interactive sequences. He also considered the sepia-toned pixel art well suited to the historical period, although he felt that voiced dialogue with a recognisably Viennese accent would have strengthened the presentation. The Austrian setting was similarly prominent in other reviews. GamesBeat regarded Vienna almost as another principal character, highlighting how locations, recurring residents and social conventions gradually broaden the world between episodes. The publication also praised the Connections Gallery for making the links between apparently separate characters visible and considered the soundtrack and sound design effective in representing their moments of inspiration and anxiety. Roland Posch of Austrian publication Gamers.at praised the emotional complexity of the stories, restrained visual presentation and soundtrack, while cautioning that players seeking conventional action or mechanically demanding gameplay were unlikely to find it.

Several critics particularly valued how the four stories treated artistic and intellectual work. Philippa Warr selected The Lion's Song as her personal 2017 Game of the Year choice for PC Gamer, describing the episodes as stories about creativity and personal flaws rather than a conventional point-and-click structure. Gamekult likewise praised the game's narrative focus, historical atmosphere and characters despite its lack of conventional challenge, arguing that the Switch release provided an opportunity to reconsider a game the publication had overlooked at its original release. Gavin Lane of Nintendo Life praised the writing, audio and visual style and considered the absence of elaborate puzzles appropriate because it allowed the game to concentrate on its themes and characters.

Criticism was concentrated on its limited interactivity and perceived unevenness between episodes. Adventure Gamers praised the sepia artwork, music, interwoven stories and unusual historical setting, but found that the game offered little conventional gameplay and that the consequences of some choices could be difficult to anticipate. Peter Glagowski of Destructoid thought that the middle episodes showed how much the project had developed beyond its shorter prototype, but considered both the first episode and the finale less substantial than the central chapters. Sparky Clarkson of GameCritics similarly regarded Franz's second episode as the strongest and criticized Closure as a weaker conclusion to the anthology. In contrast, GamesBeat considered the final chapter effective for providing historical context and showing the consequences of the earlier protagonists' lives.

The game continued to receive retrospective recognition after release. In 2022, Rainer Sigl of Der Standard included it as a retrospective recommendation among modern point-and-click adventures, describing its minimalist artwork, music, emotional characterization and narrative originality as qualities that continued to distinguish it several years after release.

=== Accolades ===
The Lion's Song won the Futurezone Award for Austrian Game of the Year in November 2016. At the 2016 Deutscher Entwicklerpreis, it won Best Indie Game and was also nominated for Best Story.

At the 2017 Independent Games Festival, The Lion's Song received an honorable mention in the Excellence in Narrative category. Other honorable mentions in the category included Inside, Stardew Valley, A Normal Lost Phone and Burly Men at Sea.
