= Unknown Horizons =

- Developer: The Unknown Horizons Team
- Engine: Godot, Flexible Isometric Free Engine (up to v2019.1)
- Platforms: Windows, Linux
- Release: January 2019 (v2019.1), October 2008 (alpha)
- Genres: City-building, real-time strategy
- Modes: Single-player, multiplayer

Unknown Horizons
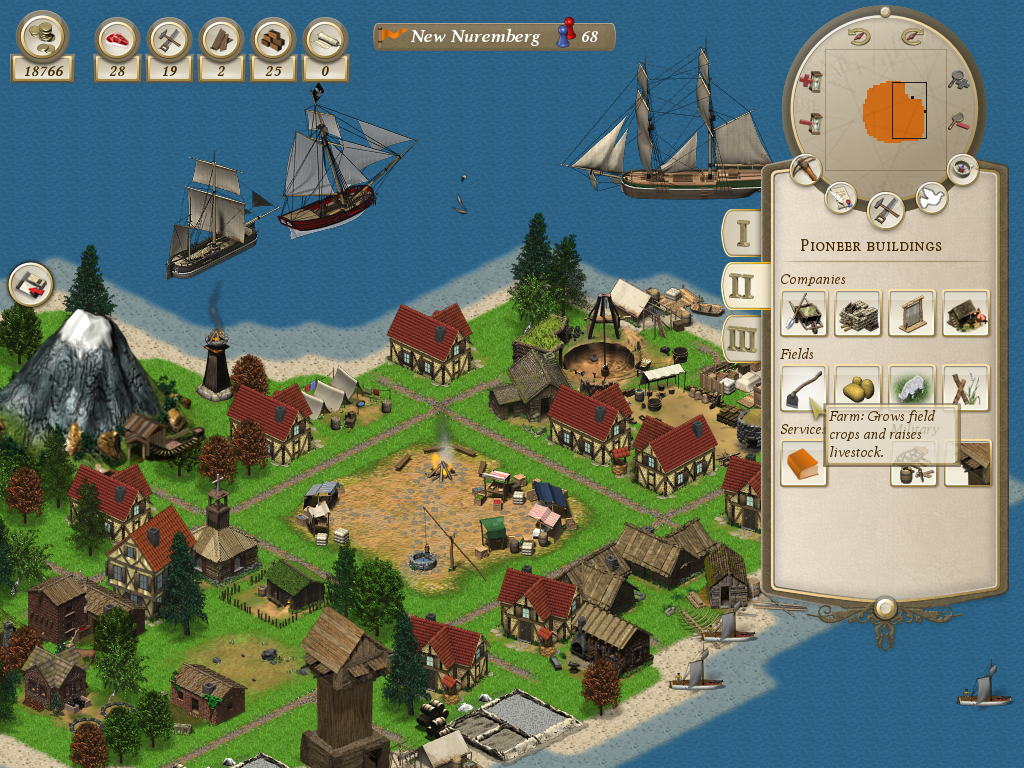
- A screenshot depicting an early settlement
- Engine: Flexible Isometric Free Engine
- License: GNU GPL v2
- Website: www.unknown-horizons.org
- Repository: github.com/unknown-horizons/godot-port

Unknown Horizons is a city-building game and real-time strategy game, inspired by the Anno series. It is released under the GNU General Public License (GPLv2) and is therefore free and open source software. Much of the artwork is open content under e.g. CC BY-SA Creative Commons licenses. The development has moved to a new repository for the Godot port.

== Gameplay ==
The player guides a group of people settling in a newly discovered archipelago of islands. The player must provide miscellaneous goods (including food, lumber and tools) and public services for the settlers' welfare. The inhabitants in return pay taxes which is the main source of income.

When supplied adequately, the population will grow and the inhabitants will rise to higher social classes. Currently, there are six different settlement levels planned and more than 40 different buildings available.

The starting increment is called "Sailors". Players can set up a basic infrastructure and provide inhabitants with resources such as food. In the second increment "Pioneers", new buildings become available. Buildings begin to look like wooden constructions instead of tents. Increment 3 is named "Settlers" and progress is shown by half-timbered buildings. The remaining three increments "Citizens", "Merchants" and "Aristocrats" are designed, but not yet implemented.

== Development ==
Unknown Horizons originated in the OpenAnno project from 2005 which aimed for being a clone of Anno 1602. The project uses Flexible Isometric Free Engine (FIFE) as game engine and features isometric 2D graphics. Since FIFE also is in development stage and Unknown Horizons is the first major project based on this engine, the developers of Unknown Horizons have agreed to help with development on FIFE. Python was chosen as the language for this project because it is the language best supported by FIFE, guarantees cross-platform compatibility, and allows rapid development. The models for Unknown Horizons are created using Blender and then rendered in four rotations (eight for units).

The first public alpha version was released on October 1, 2008. Development currently focuses on implementing more gameplay content (buildings, resource production lines). Next major steps in development include usability improvements and an island editor.

In 2009 the project was renamed from OpenAnno to Unknown Horizons.

Unknown Horizons took part at the Google Summer of Code 2011 as a mentoring organization and participated again in 2012.

In 2019, the project moved the codebase from Python 2 to Python 3. In addition, the developers asked for assistance with porting to the Godot game engine due to concerns that FIFE was no longer in active development. A separate GitHub repository was opened to manage the new codebase.

== Reception ==
Unknown Horizons was selected in October 2011 as "HotPick" by Linux Format. Despite its alpha state, Unknown Horizons already appeared in issue 24/09 of the German c't computer magazine, as a part of the Heise software collection 6/09. Between 2009 and 2016 Unknown Horizons was downloaded from SourceForge alone 250,000 times.

== See also ==
- List of open source games
