= Anno (video game series) =

Video game series

- Developers: Max Design; Related Designs; Ubisoft Blue Byte; Keen Games
- Publishers: Sunflowers Interactive; Ubisoft; Disney Interactive Studios
- Creator: Wilfried Reiter
- Platforms: Microsoft Windows; Nintendo DS; Wii; Web browser Android iOS; PlayStation 5 Xbox Series X/S
- First release: Anno 1602; April 1998
- Latest release: Anno 117: Pax Romana; 13 November 2025

Anno, early on also known as A.D., is a real-time strategy, economic simulation video game series, conceived in 1998 by Max Design. The series focuses on players establishing colonies on a series of small islands, conducting an exploration of the region, diplomacy, and trade with other civilizations and traders while managing resources and engaging in combat both on land and sea. Most games in the series take place during Renaissance and Empire-building historical periods of Earth's history, with cultures, architecture, and customs based upon real-life elements from these periods, though in-game civilizations tend to be neutral from exact nations.

Each game in the series is mainly a stand-alone title, featuring the same level of reoccurring gameplay mechanics, though each installment amends existing gameplay mechanics and adds new features, with expansion packs adding further content. Initial games mainly focused on two modes of gameplay, with players able to operate in single-player or multiplayer over LAN or online connections, while later titles added a campaign mode of several missions, each featuring their own unique storyline - plots usually focus on players becoming involved in a major incident while beginning life as the ruler of a small island.

While primarily developed for PC, the series has also included a variety of spin-off titles mainly for handheld consoles, which in turn feature more simplified game mechanics to those of the main series. Each title over the series' history has featured a variety of different developers and publishers, with the most recent entries being currently developed by Ubisoft Blue Byte and published by Ubisoft. Most entries in the series have received average reviews from critics. The first title, Anno 1602, was Germany's best-selling computer game of all time as of December 2002, with sales of 2.5 million copies worldwide and 1.7 million in the German market. Its sequel broke its sales-speed record, becoming Germany's fastest full-price computer game to reach 500,000 domestic sales. It ultimately sold over one million units in German-speaking countries, and, when combined with its predecessor, reached 4.5 million sales worldwide by October 2006.

== Titles ==
Releases timeline
1998	Anno 1602
1999
2000
2001
2002	Anno 1503
2003
2004
2005
2006	Anno 1701
2007
2008
2009	Anno 1404
2010
2011	Anno 2070
2012
2013
2014
2015	Anno 2205
2016
2017
2018
2019	Anno 1800
2020
2021
2022
2023
2024
2025	Anno 117

=== Main series ===
Title	Year	Developer	Expansions	Notes
Anno 1602	1998	Max Design	New Islands, New Adventures (1998)	Also marketed as 1602 A.D.
Anno 1503	2002	Max Design	Treasures, Monsters and Pirates (2004)	Also marketed as 1503 A.D.: The New World
Anno 1701	2006	Related Designs	The Sunken Dragon (2007)	Also marketed as 1701 A.D.
Anno 1404	2009	Related Designs, Ubisoft Blue Byte	Venice (2010)	Also marketed as Dawn of Discovery
Anno 2070	2011	Related Designs, Ubisoft Blue Byte	Deep Ocean (2012)	
Anno 2205	2015	Ubisoft Blue Byte	Tundra (2016); Orbit (2016); Frontiers (2016)	
Anno 1800	2019	Ubisoft Blue Byte	Sunken Treasures (2019); Botanica (2019); The Passage (2019); Seat of Power (2020); Bright Harvest (2020); Land of Lions (2020); Docklands (2021); Tourist Season (2021); The High Life (2021); Seeds of Change (2022); Empire of the Skies (2022); New World Rising (2022)	First game in the main series to release on consoles.
Anno 117	2025	Ubisoft Mainz	Prophecies of Ash (2026) The Hippodrome (2026)	Also marketed as Anno 117: Pax Romana

=== Spin-offs ===
- Anno 1701: Dawn of Discovery (2007)

A video game for the Nintendo DS, and spin-off of the series.

- Anno: Create A New World (2009)

A video game for the Nintendo DS and the Wii, known in North America as Dawn of Discovery.

- Anno Online (2013–2018)

A free-to-play browser game (shut down in January 2018).

- Anno: Build an Empire (2015)

A standalone mobile game for Android and iOS platforms (has since been shut down).

- Anno 2205: Asteroid Miner (2015)

A mobile companion app for Android and iOS platforms (shut down in October 2018).

== See also ==
- The Settlers, a similar German real-time strategy and business simulation game
- Unknown Horizons, a game inspired by the Anno series
- The Patrician, a similar German game series focused on ships and trade, but also featuring Anno-like strategy elements
