= Anno Online =

2013 video game

- Developer: Ubisoft Blue Byte
- Publisher: Ubisoft
- Series: Anno
- Platform: Browser
- Release: 19 March 2013
- Genre: Strategy
- Mode: Multiplayer

Anno Online was a free-to-play strategy browser game by Ubisoft. It was a spin-off of the Anno series. The players could develop and manage island braced cities from the first settlers to commercial empires.

English closed beta started on 23 April 2013, and open beta started on 14 May. Beta status ended on 25 September. The game was in "maintenance mode" starting in September 2017, meaning there was no further development or major in-game events. The game was closed on 31 January 2018.
