= Burntime =

1993 video game

- Amiga box art
- Developer: Max Design
- Publisher: Max Design
- Programmers: Albert Lasser; Wilfried Reiter
- Writers: Albert Lasser; Wilfried Reiter
- Composers: Clemens Helbock; Hannes Seifert
- Platforms: Amiga, MS-DOS
- Release: EU: 1993; NA: 1994
- Genres: Role-playing, strategy
- Modes: Single-player, multiplayer

Burntime is a strategy/RPG video game for MS-DOS and Amiga produced by Max Design in 1993.

== Plot ==
The game is set in a post-apocalyptic future, based on the three stages of every civilized society: ascent, heyday, and downfall. Burntime starts at the end of a flourishing civilization. The main goal of the game is to conquer the remaining habitable areas, as well as to survive.

== Gameplay ==
To progress through the game the player must establish sources of food and water. The player must then clear out hostiles and hire mercenaries to guard the location. Armor can be found in the form of protective suits, and all elements of a suit must be collected for full protection.

There are three classes of mercenaries: doctors, technicians, and fighters. Fighters are good at defending areas and killing monsters. Technicians are needed to combine scrap items to produce working items (for example, wire, screws, and a woodpile will produce a rat trap, a great source of food and income). Finally, doctors will heal the player and their men if they keep them over a period of time.
