= Anno: Create A New World =

2009 video game

Anno: Create a New World
- Developer: Keen Games
- Publisher: Ubisoft
- Series: Anno
- Platforms: Nintendo DS, Wii
- Release: EU: May 22, 2009; NA: June 23, 2009
- Genres: City-building, Real-time strategy
- Mode: Single-player

Anno: Create a New World (German: Anno: Erschaffe eine neue Welt), also known as Dawn of Discovery in North America, is a real-time strategy and city-building game for Nintendo DS and Wii. It was developed by Keen Games and is published by Ubisoft. The game is a spin-off of the Anno series.

== Plot ==
It takes place in year 1404, where King George's land suffers from drought and famine. Aware of the distress of his citizens, he decides to remedy the situation by sending his two sons, William (Kevin Howarth) and Edward, to explore new fertile territories that could produce enough goods to satisfy his people. Despite being brothers, both sons have very different personalities; where Edward suggests fighting to collect the resources they need, his brother William offers a more peaceful approach, suggesting they explore new and unsettled lands to the south.

With the agreement of his father, William heads south, where he discovers the Oriental culture. He befriends the locals and, in return, they teach William new technologies and secrets to take back to his father's kingdom. However, the Sultan is suddenly kidnapped, and his aggressive sister takes over control of the Orient. She cuts all friendly relations with George's empire and expresses a desire to attack. Having not totally met his needs for resources, George sends both of his sons abroad to procure more goods for his empire in whatever manner possible, in order to be prepared for imminent battle.

== Reception ==
Reception

Aggregate score
| Aggregator | Score |
|---|---|
| Metacritic | 81/100 |

Anno: Create a New World received "generally favorable" reviews according to review aggregator Metacritic.
