= Anno 1503 =

2002 video game

- Developer: Max Design
- Publishers: DE: Sunflowers Interactive; WW: Electronic Arts (Note: Released under the EA Games banner); Ubisoft (History Edition)
- Series: Anno
- Platform: Microsoft Windows
- Release: DE: October 25, 2002; NA: April 4, 2003; EU: March 23, 2003
- Genres: Real-time strategy, city-building game
- Mode: Single-player

Anno 1503: The New World (released as 1503 A.D.: The New World in North America and simply Anno 1503 in Austria and Germany) is a 2002 construction and management simulation video game developed by Austrian developer Max Design and published by Sunflowers Interactive. Part of the Anno series, it is a direct sequel to Anno 1602, the most commercially successful German video game ever by 2002. Anno 1503 is set in the early modern period and revolves around building and maintaining a 16th-century colony in the New World.

Like its predecessor, the game was a commercial hit in the German market, and became Germany's best-selling computer title of 2002. By 2006, the game's global sales had reached 2 million units, with over 750,000 sold in German-speaking territories. It was followed by an expansion pack, Treasures, Monsters & Pirates, and a sequel, Anno 1701.

== Gameplay ==
Anno 1503 begins with the player in control of a ship filled with men and material searching for an island to settle. After finding a suitable site, city-building begins. Resources begin as food and cloth, but progress into more complicated and different goods. Eventually, citizens become Aristocrats, and require at least ten different goods and numerous services, such as access to a large church or a bathhouse. The game is constructed around one human player and three computer AI players. As in Anno 1602, the AI is progressive, meaning that it advances along with the human player. The AI also has adjustable personalities, which the player customizes before the beginning of a game. Each different player, human or computer, is represented by a color.

=== Economy ===
The economy in Anno 1503 is built on providing different goods to colonist citizens. It begins with the creation of cheap goods, and progresses in civilization levels throughout the game leading to more advanced goods. Since the game is built on different levels of civilizations (pioneer, settler, citizen, merchant, aristocrat), each successive civilization level requires more goods and more balancing of skills and finesse.

=== Technology ===
Technology in Anno 1503 begins on the pioneer level. After giving citizens basic goods like food, cloth, and alcohol, they develop into settlers, the second civilization level. The second level allows the player's settlers to build more advanced buildings; however, settlers also require more goods to stay alive. Buildings in the game do not necessarily have a specific function for the player, but have an implied or effective function for settlers in the game. Building abilities are amplified with expansion, meaning larger populations have more effective building powers.

Military operations in this game are more complex than in Anno 1602. The game has more than seven different types of units as opposed to Anno 1602 with only four. Thus, during battles, the game experience becomes more intense as deploying different units becomes a key strategy for winning a battle.

The buildings in the game are also more extensive than those of Anno 1602. This is mainly because the gameplay area and islands are many times bigger than in 1602. Thus, it makes it possible to have many more plantations and a diversity of farmhouses. Alongside the houses and farms featured in the previous game, this game also has many more extensive farms for gems, silk, whale blubber, lamp oil, medicinal herbs, hops, wine, indigo, coal, hides, leather, and salt, increasing gameplay difficulty. Building and house graphics are improved over the previous game.

== Development ==
Anno 1503 began development in January 1999, following the success of 1998's Anno 1602. Publisher Sunflowers Interactive announced it in November of that year. In April 2001, Electronic Arts signed a deal with Sunflowers to secure distribution rights to the title outside German-speaking territories and Japan and that they would handle localisation for ten different languages.

An add-on titled Treasures, Monsters & Pirates was released in 2004. Electronic Arts also published this title outside Germany.

== Reception ==
=== Sales ===
Commercial expectations for Anno 1503 were high, as its predecessor, Anno 1602, was the German market's all-time best-selling video game by 2002. Retailers pre-purchased 450,000 units of the game ahead of its launch, and it became a hit that "dominated" the charts in German-speaking countries during its first months of release, according to 4players. It debuted at #1 on GfK's weekly computer game sales charts for the German market, following the title's release on October 25. Anno 1503 proceeded to claim first place on German firm Media Control's chart for the month as a whole, after reaching domestic sales of 115,000 units during its first three days. Tim Pototzki of GamesMarkt wrote that the game's early performance "astonished" Germany. The Verband der Unterhaltungssoftware Deutschland (VUD) soon awarded the game "Gold" status, indicating sales of at least 100,000 units across Germany, Switzerland, and Austria. Anno 1503 finished its first seven days with a total of 160,000 sales in the German market, and went on to hold the #1 position on GfK's charts in its second and third weeks.

On November 15, Sunflowers revealed that German-region sales of Anno 1503 had surpassed 200,000 units in two and a half weeks, and the VUD certified the game "Platinum" to reflect that growth. The game was knocked to second place on GfK's charts by Age of Mythology and Harry Potter and the Chamber of Secrets during its fourth and fifth weeks, respectively, but it held the #1 position on Media Control's chart for November overall. In early December, Sunflowers announced a record €1.4-million television advertising campaign for Anno during the last two weeks of 2002, in an effort to further boost sales. By the 17th, the game had sold 300,000 units in the German-speaking market and become its best-selling game of 2002. Anno 1503 then maintained first place on GfK's charts for the last three weeks of the year, recovering from a drop to fourth during its seventh week on shelves. Media Control named it the #1 computer game of December.

Anno 1503 continued to sell in 2003. GfK ranked it in position 1 for the first two weeks of January, and it reached 360,000 units sold in the German market by the 20th. At the time, 4players reported that the game's sales during its first 10 weeks were three-fourths higher than Anno 1602's over the same period. Sell-through in the German market increased to 420,000 copies by mid-February and 450,000 by early March. On Media Control's monthly charts, the game secured fifth for February, then placed in the top 14 for another four months. It had maintained an unbroken streak in Media Control's top 30 by September. Coinciding with the 2003 holiday shopping season and the release of the Treasures, Monsters, and Pirates expansion pack, Sunflowers dropped Anno 1503's price to €29 in October. It subsequently rose to seventh and ninth on Media Control's charts for November and December, respectively.

In January 2004, the VUD awarded Anno 1503 a "Special Prize" for sales above 500,000 units in the German-speaking market. At the time, it was the fastest full-price computer title to reach this milestone in the region, a record previously held by Anno 1602. Media Control ranked it #2 for January and #4 for February, and it charted in the top 20 and top 30 during April, May, June, and July. Anno 1503's worldwide sales surpassed 800,000 copies that August, when it finished 14th on Media Control's list for the German market. It continued to retail in Germany for an average price of €29 by that time, which Jörg Langer of GameStar wrote was "unusual almost two years after publication — most games migrate after half a year to the budget corner and after two years to the bargain bin". The game remained on Germany's sales charts by 2006, at which time it had sold over 2 million units worldwide and 750,000 in German-speaking countries. According to GamesMarkt, Anno 1503 ultimately sold over one million units in the German market alone.

=== Critical reviews ===
Reception

Review scores
Publication	Score
Computer Gaming World	3 out of 5
Game Informer	7.5 out of 10
PC Gamer (UK)	58%
PC Gamer (US)	81%
PC Zone	78/100
X-Play	5 out of 5

== See also ==
- Video games in Germany
