= Max Design =

German video game developer and publisher

Max Design GesMBH
- Company type: Private
- Industry: Video games
- Founded: 1991; 34 years ago
- Founders: Wilfried Reiter; Albert Lasser; Martin Lasser
- Defunct: 2004
- Fate: Dissolved
- Headquarters: Schladming, Austria
- Key people: Wilfried Reiter; Albert Lasser; Martin Lasser
- Products: Anno series
- Number of employees: 13 (2004)

Max Design GesMBH was an Austrian video game developer based in Schladming. It was founded in 1991 by Wilfried Reiter, Albert Lasser, and Martin Lasser. The company is best known for creating the Anno series. The company was closed down in 2004.

== History ==
Max Design was founded in 1991 by brothers Albert Lasser and Martin Lasser together with Wilfried Reiter.

The company became known for its challenging business simulation games that attract a large fan following to this day, and in the 1990s it significantly influenced the image of the "typically German business simulation" as a separate game genre with its series History Experience, together with games such as The Patrician (Ascaron).

The game Anno 1602, initiated by Max Design and later published together with Sunflowers, marked an important boundary in two respects. On the one hand, with 2 million copies sold, it became the most successful German / Austrian computer game ever and it laid the foundation for the Anno series. On the other hand, Sunflowers secured the first shares in Max Design as part of the cooperation. With the appearance of Anno 1503, there was speculation in the fan base about a continual shift in the balance of power towards Sunflowers.

After twelve years Max Design left the game industry on April 15, 2004. All employees except the founding members were laid off. In the same year the company fully ceased all its activities. The Anno-series was continued – while under its control – by Sunflowers in cooperation with Related Designs.

In an interview, one of the company's founder later declared that, after twelve years of development, the core team was "tired" and needed some time for a re-orientation.

== Games ==
- Think Cross (1991) – (Atari ST/E, Commodore 64/128) – Puzzle
- Cash (1991) – (Amiga ECS/OCS) – Business simulation
- Osiris (1992) – (MS-DOS) – Puzzle
- Hunt The Fonts (1992) – Puzzle
- 1869 - Hart am Wind! (1992) – Business simulation
  - also known as 1869: Erlebte Geschichte Teil I
  - English name: 1869: History Experience Part I
- Burntime (1993) – (Amiga, MS-DOS) – Strategy game
- Der Clou! (1994) – (Amiga ECS/OCS, AGA, CD³²) – Adventure
  - English name The Clue
- Oldtimer (1994/95) – (Amiga ECS/OCS, AGA, MS-DOS) – Business simulation
  - also known as Oldtimer: Erlebte Geschichte Teil II
  - English name Motor City
- Clearing House (1995) – Stock market simulation
- Strike Base (1996) – Action
- Anno 1602 (1998) – (Windows) – Business simulation/Strategy
  - (Developer/Publisher: Sunflowers Interactive Entertainment Software)
- Anno 1503 (2002) – (Windows) – Business simulation/Strategy
  - (Developer/Publisher: Max Design/Sunflowers)

=== Cancelled ===
- Petko — Adventure. A playable demo was released but the game never went gold.

== Literature ==
- Max Design In: Winnie Forster: Lexikon der Computer- und Videospielmacher. Erste Auflage, S. 200. ISBN 978-3-00-021584-1.
