= Anno 117 =

2025 video game

Anno 117: Pax Romana
- Developer: Ubisoft Mainz
- Publisher: Ubisoft
- Composer: Dynamedion
- Series: Anno
- Engine: Empire Engine
- Platforms: PlayStation 5; Windows; Xbox Series X/S
- Release: 13 November 2025
- Genres: City-building, real-time strategy
- Modes: Single-player, multiplayer

Anno 117, also known as Anno 117: Pax Romana, is a real-time strategy video game developed by Ubisoft Mainz and published by Ubisoft. Set during the Pax Romana, a period of peace and prosperity in the Roman Empire, it is the eighth installment in the Anno series and the earliest historical setting in the franchise to date. Players of the city-building game assume the role of a Roman governor and can choose a starting province, ruling either the Roman Empire in Latium, the Celtic kingdom in Albion, or the province of Aegyptus. In the latter two, players may spread Roman or native (Celtic or Egyptian) cultural influence or a combination of both.

During development, Ubisoft focused on improving accessibility for new players while preserving the series' complexity. Anno 117 was designed to be more modular, allowing players to explore individual provinces with added context and story, while experienced players could still manage multiple lands and trade. Major city-building changes were introduced, including optional population needs, an attribute system, and building proximity effects. Ubisoft officially announced Anno 117 in June 2024. The reveal was followed by extensive community engagement up until release, including multiple Gamescom and community events, beta periods and a playable demo. It was released on 13 November 2025 for PlayStation 5, Windows and Xbox Series X/S.

Upon release, Anno 117 received generally positive reviews from critics, who praised the city-building gameplay and visual presentation but criticized the story. It became the fastest-selling game in the Anno series shortly after release and reached 1.17 million players by April 2026. The game appeared on several publications' year-end lists and received accolades, including a German Computer Game Award for Best Innovation and Technology. Multiple downloadable content (DLC) expansions are planned; the first, Prophecies of Ash, launched in April 2026, followed by Dawn of the Delta in November.

== Gameplay ==
Players have to gather various resources to satisfy the needs of the population, such as lavender (depicted).

Anno 117 is a real-time strategy video game featuring single-player and multiplayer modes, including co-op in both the endless mode and the campaign mode. Players take the role of a Roman governor for city-building and can choose between different starting provinces, ruling either the Roman Empire in Latium, the Celtic kingdom in Albion, or the province of Aegyptus. In the latter two, players can choose to combine cultures, or embrace native tradition. Players can choose between story mode and endless mode. In story mode, players take the role of one of two predefined characters and may continue to play after the story concludes. In endless mode, players start by choosing a province and selecting from multiple difficulty settings. Players select rival governors that have different personalities and playstyles, and they do not always follow the same rules as the player. These governors can act as either opponents or trade partners.

Players start on an island with limited resources, build a stable economy, and expand to other islands as resources and opportunities allow. They begin by building residences for Liberti, and the population advances up to Patricians as needs are met. Advancement in population is affected by access to goods and the presence of nearby prestige buildings or polluting industrial buildings. Infrastructure upgrades, including paved roads, extend the effective range of these structures and improve efficiency. Attributes, such as income, population, and health, are managed through an attribute system that is influenced by buildings and the supply of goods. Supplying specific goods increases population, satisfaction, or income depending on the type. Players can focus on particular attributes by managing resources and constructing appropriate buildings. Production chains can span multiple islands and require inter-island trade. Trade routes use assigned ships to transport goods that can be tracked and rerouted. Small settlements, warehouses, and waystations help manage logistics, and intra-region hubs let players consolidate and speed up exports. Effective economic management produces trade surpluses that can be sold to further increase income. Players can also stabilize economic crises by placing buy orders at harbors.

In terms of diplomacy, players have to complete orders for the Emperor as he makes demands that affect the player's reputation with Rome. Fulfilling or refusing these demands grants bonuses or penalties, and high reputation levels lead to major rewards. High reputation with the Emperor can earn Consul status, while opposing him may grant Proconsular authority. When encountering rival governors, players can respond to competition through either diplomatic engagement or military conflict. Combat takes place both at sea and on land. Ships in naval battles move differently depending on whether they use sails, oars, or both. They play an important role in protecting trade routes from pirates. Land combat includes melee, ranged, and siege units, though players may avoid it completely with a strong navy. Unit selection relies on a rock paper scissors-system, requiring coordination between melee, ranged, and cavalry units to maximize effectiveness and minimize losses in combat. Religion functions as a gameplay system in which belief is accumulated and tied to chosen gods that grant scaling bonuses. Schools operate in a similar manner, generating research points that unlock technologies in a research tree, with additional schools increasing the speed of research. The research tree contains over 100 unlocks, including buildings, units, bonuses, and repeatable technologies.

== Synopsis ==
=== Setting and characters ===
Anno 117 is set during the Pax Romana, a period of peace and prosperity in the Roman Empire. Players focus on expanding the empire, reflecting the era's emphasis on territorial growth. It is the earliest historical setting in the franchise to date. In story mode, players assume the role of one of two siblings, Marcus Naukratius or Marcia Tertia. As Marcus, players follow a young man uncertain of himself as he takes on the unexpected role of a Roman governor, while Marcia rises to prominence in a male-dominated Roman Empire, challenging its societal norms.

=== Plot ===
The sibling (Marcus Naukratius or Marcia Tertia) is summoned to Latium by Emperor Lucius Augustus. The city of Ambrosia lies in ruins after a volcanic eruption and must be rebuilt under the new name Juliana. With guidance from the imperial advisor Ben Baalion, the sibling works to restore the city. Just as the province begins to recover, Emperor Augustus dies. (Note: Depending on player choices, Emperor Augustus either dies of a heart attack or is assassinated.) Gnaeus Firmius Calidus seizes control of the Senate and crowns himself Emperor, forcing the sibling into exile in Albion, a remote and untamed land.

In Albion, the sibling must gain the trust of the native Celtic population and establish new settlements. They encounter Voada, a Celtic leader, and tensions arise during their interactions. The sibling manages to settle the situation, stabilizes Albion and lays the groundwork for the empire's expansion. (Note: Depending on player choices, Voada must either be defeated or peace must be achieved by completing three diplomatic missions.) With the province secure, the future of its settlements and people rests in their hands. After finding success in Albion, Calidus allows the sibling to return to Latium. They participate in a triumph ceremony, reclaim Juliana and Calidus offers them a reward for their efforts.

== Development ==
Anno 117 was developed by Ubisoft Mainz and published by Ubisoft. It is the eighth installment in the Anno series and follows known strategic city-building elements. The Federal Government of Germany subsidized the development with 5,697,585 euro, which was its highest funding amount to date for a single video-game project. The Minister for Economic Affairs presented the sum at Gamescom 2023. Anno 117 was planned to launch with built-in modding support, including a mod loader, as Ubisoft aimed to enable community modifications much earlier compared to Anno 1800. Mods have been supported since launch, though features like the in-game mod user interface and browser are still planned for post-release updates.

In an interview with IGN, creative director Manuel Reinher stated that the team had focused on improving the starting experience for new players while maintaining the game's complexity. They aimed to make the game more modular, allowing new players to choose and explore specific provinces with more context and story. Core players were still expected to enjoy managing multiple lands and engaging in trade, as the game would be more adaptable and user-friendly. The team was committed to keeping the brand's legacy while introducing new features. The focus on fresh ideas and more social content was presented as a new way to meet player expectations. They described their rebranding efforts as a reason to expand the community and strengthen the partnership between players and developers for the best experience.

In a developer livestream, Ubisoft revealed that Anno 117 introduces major changes to city-building, including optional needs that allow players to partially fulfill categorized requirements to advance population tiers. A new attribute system links resources to specific benefits and drawbacks, affecting attributes like population, income, and satisfaction. Additionally, production buildings provide positive or negative effects for nearby structures, encouraging strategic placement and more integrated city layouts. Developers told GameStar that Anno 117 addresses the reality of slavery in the Roman Empire through its story but avoids using it as a gameplay mechanic. Although slavery is not part of the gameplay, the game includes Liberti, freed slaves who make up the first working population and who often remained dependent on their former owners and had restrictive duties towards them.

=== Release ===
Anno 117 was revealed during the Ubisoft Forward showcase in June 2024. A live-action teaser trailer was released to accompany the announcement. It features a public herald reciting Roman scripture to an empty field of sheep, which compensated for the lack of gameplay footage. Shortly after the initial reveal, a screenshot was leaked after being accidentally uploaded to the official Anno site and quickly removed. The leaked image showed a large coastal settlement divided into several areas. The herald appeared in a second promotional video featuring 117 social media comments from people who had long wished for the Roman Empire to be the setting for the new Anno game. Several artworks were released, which, according to the developers, contain some hints about the game's content.

In July 2024, Ubisoft Mainz held a contest via Anno Union in which anyone was able to design an ornament for Anno 117. A template was provided for the contest that fans could use to get creative. The silhouette of a statue needed to be completed and sent to Ubisoft. Two further community contests were held, with participants creating an in-game quest in the first and designing an island in the second. At Gamescom 2024, Ubisoft shared new details about Anno 117. Significant changes to established mechanics, especially through the concept of Romanization versus Celtic traditions, were introduced. Cultural paths that influence city development, production chains, and population progression were presented. In November 2024, the first official screenshots were released, showing the confirmed regions of Albion and Latium. The shown landscapes include rocky terrain, forested green areas, and a marsh-like environment.

In February 2025, Ubisoft announced multiple closed beta periods for Anno 117, allowing players to sign up immediately for the first one. That same month, a developer trailer introduced modular ships as a new feature. GamingBolt reported that players can build and customize their ships with modifications such as oars for better maneuverability or extra sails to catch favorable winds. On 19 May 2025, a new trailer was released, unveiling gameplay for the first time. Polygon noted some changes from previous installments, such as the ability to construct buildings diagonally and the impact of production building placement on their surrounding area. At Gamescom 2025, attendants were able to play a demo version of the game. A PC-exclusive demo was released on 2 September 2025, featuring one hour of playable content. The soundtrack for Anno 117 was produced in collaboration with Dynamedion and released on 7 November 2025. The game was released on 13 November 2025 for PlayStation 5, Windows and Xbox Series X/S.

=== Post-release ===
Anno 117 is set to receive multiple downloadable content (DLC) expansions starting in 2026. The DLCs are part of a Year Pass, which includes three expansions. The first, Prophecies of Ash, will add a large island featuring a volcano and will introduce the god Vulcanus. The second, The Hippodrome, will offer a new monument where players can host chariot races. The third, Dawn of the Delta, will introduce an Egyptian-inspired province with unique populations, goods chains, deities, and military units, highlighting cultural interaction between Romans and Egyptians. The DLCs are scheduled for release in April, August, and November 2026. Funding from the Federal Government of Germany was increased by 800,729 euro to support the release of the third planned DLC.

The first cosmetic DLC, the "Marvellous Mosaic Pack", was released on 19 February 2026. On 30 April, Ubisoft Mainz released the first DLC of the Year One Pass, Prophecies of Ash. Later that year, on 18 June, Ubisoft released the "Blooming Cities Pack", the second cosmetic DLC for Anno 117. The third cosmetic DLC, Echoes of Kassandra, was announced to be released in September that year. The second DLC of the Year One Pass introduced the Hippodrome in August 2026. The third, Dawn of the Delta, which opened Aegyptus as the game's third province, released in November 2026.

== Reception ==
=== Critical response ===
Reception

Aggregate scores
Aggregator	Score
Metacritic	(PC) 84/100 (Note: Based on 62 scored reviews of 66 total reviews) (PS5) 83/100 (Note: Based on 12 reviews) (XSXS) 81/100 (Note: Based on 4 reviews)
OpenCritic	90% (Note: Based on 93 reviews)

Review scores
Publication	Score
4Players	9/10
GamesRadar+	4/5
IGN	9/10
PC Gamer (UK)	80/100
PC Games (DE)	9/10
TechRadar	4/5

Anno 117 received "generally favorable" reviews, according to the review aggregator website Metacritic. OpenCritic stated that 90% of critics recommended the game.

The city-building gameplay was well received by critics. TechRadar positively noted the game's engaging supply chain management and described it as more accessible than recent entries in the Anno series. IGN praised the immersive city-building experience and strong sense of a living, populated city. PC Games praised the city-building controls, noting that construction and district planning are handled smoothly and efficiently. Rock, Paper, Shotgun lauded the addition of diagonal roads for increasing flexibility in city layouts and enhancing aesthetic design. Conversely, GamesRadar+ criticized the lack of simple tools for managing inefficient city production.

Critics praised the visual presentation, especially its attention to environmental detail and atmosphere. IGN highlighted the detailed architecture and environments, noting that the visual presentation contributes strongly to the game's atmosphere. GamesRadar+ and PC Gamer similarly praised the visuals, commending the detailed cities that create a sense of a living world. Rock, Paper, Shotgun complimented the city design possibilities and visual details, placing Anno 117's cities among the most attractive in the series, yet criticized the lack of buildings for diagonal corners, which creates visual gaps in layouts. 4Players praised the detailed graphics and impressive ray tracing effects while highlighting the varied landscapes and provinces as a visual strength. PC Games complimented the game's lighting atmosphere and weather effects as excellent.

Combat was mostly well received, though some critics deemed land battles inferior. IGN positively noted the naval combat, describing it as weighty and representative of a full real-time strategy experience, while land battles were considered "just fine". PC Games highlighted naval battles as realistic, while land battles were seen as solid and an improvement over previous entries in the Anno series. 4Players criticized land battles for being relatively small and less spectacular. Rock, Paper, Shotgun noted favorably that combat in Anno 117 is easy to understand and well-integrated in the overall gameplay experience.

The story received mostly negative reviews, but Marcia's storyline earned some praise. 4Players criticized that the campaign story is completely overshadowed by the sheer number of economic systems, trade routes, and optimization possibilities. IGN considered the story campaign as short and limited, serving mainly as an introduction to the game's systems. PC Games similarly criticized the campaign's length and highlighted the lack of player influence on the story with either character. TechRadar considered the story mode primarily a tutorial, but noted that playing as a named character adds extra narrative detail. CGMagazine positively noted the inclusion of a female protagonist and the narrative focus on her challenges in ruling, though criticized the campaign for its slow pacing. In the context of slavery in the narrative, GamesRadar+ felt that it is acknowledged as negative but handled with limited thematic depth.

=== Sales ===
Shortly after its release, Ubisoft announced that Anno 117 set a new record as the fastest-selling game in the series. On Steam, the game peaked at 50,484 concurrent players, nearly doubling the player count of its predecessor. From 11 to 18 November 2025, it held the third spot on Steam's global bestseller chart. It topped the revenue rankings in Germany, Austria and Switzerland, while reaching second place in France, fifth in the UK and eighth in the United States. It ranked among Steam's best-selling games of 2025.

In Germany, Anno 117 debuted at number two on the November 2025 sales chart, selling over 200,000 copies that month. It finished the year at number seven on Germany's annual chart, becoming the best-selling German-produced game of 2025. By April 2026, the game had reached 1.17 million players across full purchases and Ubisoft+ Premium subscriptions.

=== Accolades ===
Prior to its release, Anno 117 received two Gamescom Awards at Gamescom 2025 for Best PC Game and Best Booth (Jury Award). It appeared on several year-end lists of 2025, including PC Games (5th), Die Zeit, NPR, and Der Spiegel. IGN honored it with the Best Strategy Game of 2025 award. At the 2026 German Computer Game Award, the game received nominations for Best German Game, Best Audio Design, and Best Innovation and Technology, winning the latter award.
