= Anno 1404 =

2009 city-building game

- Developers: Related Designs; Blue Byte
- Publisher: Ubisoft
- Composers: David Christiansen (Dynamedion)
- Series: Anno
- Platform: Windows
- Release: June 25, 2009
- Genres: City-building, business simulation, real-time strategy
- Modes: Single-player, multiplayer

Anno 1404, known as Dawn of Discovery in North America, is a city-building and economic simulation game with real-time strategy elements, part of the Anno series. Released in 2009, it was developed by Related Designs, produced by Blue Byte, and published by Ubisoft. Anno 1404 is the sequel to Anno 1701 and is followed by the futuristic sequel Anno 2070. Though the game centers on a series of fictional events, the overall concept of the storyline is based upon real life aspects of medieval and renaissance history such as the Crusades, advancements in gothic architecture, construction of cathedrals, and hanseatic trade involving the rise of patrician merchants and early forms of capitalism.

An expansion, titled Anno 1404: Venice, which adds multiplayer and other features, was released on February 26, 2010.

The game received several awards, including a Red Dot Design Award and the German Computer Game Award.

== Gameplay ==
As with other Anno games, the player, at the will of their unnamed country of origin creates and manages their fief aside AI players. The player must colonize islands, plan settlements, set up factories and farms to meet their citizens' needs, enter diplomatic relationships with AI players, and engage in naval and ground combat with others.

One of the main focuses of the game in the "city building setting" sense centers on the construction of monuments, namely a Gothic cathedral and an Arabic mosque. The construction phases of these monuments are dependent on certain preconditions which have to be met in order to continue building. The player also needs to stockpile building material in order to commence such a project. The process of the construction of the cathedral resembles very closely the castle/palace (and Asian Dragon Temple) feature that was displayed in 1404's predecessor, Anno 1701.

Trade is an essential element of forward progress. Occidental populations can not grow past a certain level of success without Spice, and later Quartz, that can only be generated in Oriental lands. Although populations generate taxable income, it is difficult to generate enough gold to make meaningful capital investments without extensive trading. This is simplified by an automatic trading process that allows an island to make resources available to visiting merchant ships.

As players progress through the game, they gain access to naval vessels and troops which allow them to invade and ultimately to defeat other players. Anno 1404 features an updated interface, bigger islands and worlds to explore, a sandbox mode and other features new to the Anno series.

=== New features ===
Anno 1404 has several new features that distinguish it from its three predecessors: These features include:

==== Occident and Orient ====
Anno 1404 differed from previous games in the series, by allowing players to build two different styles of settlements. The latter, set within the Orient, provides various items needed to help produce goods for the main style of settlement.

As was the case in Anno 1701, the game world is divided into two culturally distinct zones. In Anno 1404, these zones are inspired by, though not intended to be historically accurate to, northwestern Renaissance Europe and the medieval Near East, referred to as the Occident and the Orient respectively. One of the major differences between previous entries in the series and Anno 1404 is that players are required to build both occidental and oriental settlements simultaneously in order for the inhabitants of their settlements and available buildings to advance. Despite the addition of player-managed oriental settlements, the Occident remains the primary focus of the game. The Orient acts more of a trading partner in order for Occidental people to advance in class. In order for this to occur, Oriental goods such as spice, indigo and quartz must be produced and shipped from Oriental colonies.

==== Housing levels ====
There are a total of six levels of housing including both occidental and oriental settlements (one more than the levels included in Anno 1701). The four occidental levels are peasants, citizens, patricians and noblemen. The two oriental levels are nomads and envoys. In the Occident, the player starts by building peasant housing, and in the orient, the players start by building nomad housing, both of which advance when conditions are met. These conditions include the acquisition of goods as mentioned above, as well as the construction of specific buildings, such as a debtors' prison, bath house or a cathedral.

==== Civilization class ratios ====
In Anno 1701, every residential structure could be advanced to the uppermost class, so a city could be entirely made up of Aristocrats by the end of a game. In Anno 1404, a number of peasants are required to support a moderate number of citizens who in turn support a number of patricians and noblemen. There are several other factors that can impact the ratio of lower class to upper class, however. For instance, the number of envoys settled in the player's oriental settlements will satisfy a sum of the peasants and citizens required to support patricians and noblemen in occidental settlements.

==== New goods ====
Since the game takes place in the year 1404, the range of goods available is significantly different from the goods available in the previous games, which took place later in history (although goods like fish and beer were retained from the previous installments). Some of the new goods include spices, bread, meat, candlesticks, leather jerkins, and brocade robes for the Occident and dates, milk, carpets, pearl necklaces, and marzipan for the Orient.

==== Quests ====
Although quests are not new to Anno 1404, both it and its expansion Venice feature far more quests than previous games in the series. Quests are given at different intervals to the player by neutral powers, mentors like Northburgh and Al Zahir, and from various people living in the player's settlements. Computer opponents, if they become allies through diplomacy, will also offer quests to the player. Quests offer rewards such as honour points, ships, gold, goods or upgrades for settlements or ships (such as items to boost goods production in a settlement or increase the firepower of a ship). There are several quest types, including fetch quests, reverse fetch quests, sinking enemy ships, or finding specific individuals in a settlement (a mini game similar to Where's Waldo). Some of these quests can be quite complicated, with multiple smaller quests in the chain. The Anno 1404: Venice expansion adds 300 new quests and two new types of quests: trading race and ship boarding.

=== Achievements ===
Anno 1404 and its add-on Venice add the possibility of rewarding achievements to the player. Those achievements can be seen as 'milestones' and vary from quite easy to extremely hard, since a lot of them are 'hidden'. The achievements are divided in 5 categories: diplomacy, setup, economic, military and general. Quite a few of the achievements are interlinked, being part of another 'bigger' achievement. In the base game there were 206 achievements to be had, the Venice expansion added another 110 of them, totalling 316. As of patch 2.1/1.3 not all achievements are reachable, as syntax errors in the games' xml files are still present. Trying to correct these game files will result in the achievement not being awarded as the game recognises this as modification. This has been addressed by an unofficial user-made patch.

== Plot ==
Lord Richard Northburgh, the treasurer of the Occidental Empire, is concerned for the health of the Emperor, after he fell ill with a mysterious illness. Seeking to pray for his recovery, Northburgh works to build a magnificent Cathedral in the Empire's capital, and grants the player with a fiefdom to build a new settlement and support his plans. As the cathedral's construction progresses, both find themselves recruited by Cardinal Lucius, an unscrupulous religious leader, into helping with the preparations for a Crusade against the Saracens of the Orient, under the supervision of Lucius' second-in-command, Guy Forcas. During their work, Northburgh becomes suspicious about the Emperor's illness, and slowly begins to suspect there is a plot to overthrow him.

With the crusade completed, Lucius leaves it under the command of Marie d'Artois, who brings most of the assembled forces to the Orient. However, Northburgh discovers that children from a settlement she had been governing went missing in her absence, and leads the player to the Orient after discovering Forcas moving several ships out of the region. Making contact with the Grand Vizier of the Sultan, Al Zahir, the group discovers that the children were abducted by Forcas to ensure the crusade cannot be stopped. During their escape, Forcas encounters the Corsairs led by Hassan ben Sahid, who grant him safe passage in exchange for the children. With the assistance of Al Zahir, the player defeats the Corsairs and rescues the children. Forcas then has Northburgh arrested for interfering in Lucius' plans. Concerned about the crusade, Al Zahir works with the player to find evidence of Forcas' betrayal in order to convince Marie to end her involvement. In response, she lends her fleet to the player, which is ultimately used to defeat Forcas.

Angered at discovering his plot has been unmasked, Lucius pursues after the player and Marie, as they flee the area. Although they initially attempt to fight against him, Marie ultimately is forced to receive aid from Al Zahir, whereupon he brings them to the island where the Emperor had been since falling ill. After Marie leaves to defend her homeland from Lucius, the player works with Al Zahir to cure the Emperor, along the way freeing Northburgh after learning he was imprisoned nearby. The group swiftly learn the Emperor had been poisoned, and that Lucius was behind the plot. Seeking to stop this, Northburgh and the player return to the Empire's capitol to thwart Lucius' plan, with the Emperor arriving with reinforcements that help to end the war and bring peace to the Empire.

== Development ==
=== Soundtrack ===
The soundtrack was produced by Dynamedion. To combine Eastern and Western sounds, exotic instruments and vocal music were utilized, with live orchestra musicians engaged instead of synthetic samples. It was recorded in collaboration with the Staatsorchester Halle and the Philharmonic Choir Leipzig.

=== Digital rights management ===
The game has a rigorous digital rights management (DRM) system based on Tagès. It forces users to activate their game online once by submitting an activation code after each installation on a different computer or a significant hardware change. The activation can be performed on any PC with an Internet connection. It can only be activated three times by default and unlike many other DRM systems, it does not support revocation of already used licenses. Further licenses could be requested free of charge by contacting Ubisoft.

The copy protection has been completely removed with patch v1.1 for the DVD version. Digital download versions retain the copy protection, with some exceptions such as the version sold by GOG.com. With the latter, online multiplayer still requires a Ubisoft Connect account and key code; offline multiplayer needs only a LAN connection.

=== Patches ===
Version 1.0 of the game was shipped with a number of bugs in it and although patch 1.1 addressed some of them (and removed the copy protection), a new patch was released with the Venice add-on (originally version 2.0), updating the base game to 1.2. On November 25, 2010, a third patch was released to address (among other things) a serious save game bug, patching the base game to version 1.3 and the Venice expansion to version 2.1. The 'Gold' version of the game that includes both the original game and the Venice expansion was also patched in November 2010 to version 3.1, which combines all the changes of the version 1.3 patch of the base game, and version 2.1 of Venice.

== Reception ==
Reception

Aggregate score
Aggregator	Score
Metacritic	82/100

Review scores
Publication	Score
Eurogamer	8/10
GameSpot	8.5/10
GamesRadar+	favorable
IGN	8.2/10

Anno 1404 received "generally favorable reviews" according to the review aggregator website Metacritic.

IGN gave the game an 8.2, saying it was "a worthy successor to the Anno franchise". D Critic praised the game, saying that "with up-to-date graphics, a great soundtrack, and great gameplay, there's a lot to love about this game".

The British magazine CVG gave the game a 6.1, saying, "The Anno series has been delivering solid if unspectacular city-building and strategy for a few years now. Imagine a straight-faced The Settlers and you're getting there".

== Expansion ==
Anno 1404: Venice (German: Anno 1404: Venedig) was released on February 26, 2010. The expansion includes 15 new scenarios, an espionage system, volcanic islands and an added third non-player power known as the Venetian dignitary Giacomo Garibaldi. Garibaldi enables the player to sabotage other player's cities and/or buy them out. Originally, there were also three new computer players planned but these were scrapped for unknown reasons. The Venice expansion also allows the player to play the original 6 scenarios of the base game but with all the added features and improvements of the Venice addon.

Many new buildings were added:

- A multi-part personal mansion
- New ornamental buildings such as Saint Mark's pillar

Two new quest type were added: ship race and privateering.

Furthermore, the player now has the option of requesting a quest in order to gain more honour points and/or gold coins/goods.
