= 1869 (video game) =

1992 video game

1869 - Hart am Wind!
- Cover art
- Developer(s): Max Design
- Publisher(s): Max Design
- Platform(s): MS-DOS, Amiga
- Release: EU: 1992
- Genre(s): Strategy

1869 is a strategy and economics trading game developed for MS-DOS and Amiga and released by the Austrian company Max Design in 1992.

Music was composed by Hannes Seifert for the Adlib OPL sound card.

== Gameplay ==
The game is played by managing a trading company during the golden age of clipper ships, purchasing goods at one port, moving them to another and selling them at a profit. Passengers can also be transported on certain ships.

The game supports up to four players who take turns giving orders to their ships. If there is more than one player then the game starts with a ship auction of a number of schooners, the starting price is lower than they can be found for in game and the number available is always one less than the number of players.

Additional bonus revenues can be earned from running naval blockades, shipping tea to England or making a priority goods delivery.
