= ParaWorld =

2006 video game

- Developer: Spieleentwicklungskombinat GmbH
- Publishers: Sunflowers; Deep Silver; Aspyr; Auran
- Platform: Microsoft Windows
- Release: EU: September 15, 2006; NA: September 27, 2006; AU: October 10, 2006
- Genre: Real-time strategy
- Modes: Single-player; Multiplayer

ParaWorld is a real-time strategy PC game released in 2006. It was developed by the German company SEK (Spieleentwicklungskombinat) GmbH, based in Berlin. The game features more than fifty prehistoric animals, especially dinosaurs and pleistocene mammals. Disc versions of the game utilise TAGES copy protection, which installs a proprietary driver on the user's system for copy protection.

== Gameplay ==
The gameplay concept is similar to "Age of Empires", which is a real-time strategy game. ParaWorld features food, wood, and stone as resources. Food can be picked from bushes, hunted from animals, fished from the sea, or farmed. Stone is located in limited deposits, and wood, cut from trees, is generally scattered throughout a map. Battles can occur on both land and sea.

The story takes place in a parallel dimension, where prehistoric life thrives alongside diverse human civilizations that are not technologically advanced. As a result, dinosaurs take the place of traditional wildlife and livestock, though some of the dinosaurs in-game are highly stylized and not necessarily scientifically accurate. Wild-living dinosaurs can be hunted for food, though some are of dangerous and aggressive species and will attack any player unit that wanders too close. Other prehistoric creatures make an appearance as well, for example woolly mammoths are used where other games might feature elephants.

Players advance through epochs in order to unlock new technologies and upgrades.

== Plot summary ==
ParaWorld ("parallel world") is an alternate universe where dinosaurs and ice age creatures never became extinct. A group of 19th-century scientists, the SEAS (the Society of Exact Alternative Science) led by scientific genius Jarvis Babbit, discovered the parallel world where dinosaurs and primitive human tribes coexist. When they subsequently learned that people don't age in this dimension and that the concept of electricity is inexistant, they decided to remain there to rule.

Later, three young scientists are led to Jarvis Babbit: the American geologist Anthony Cole, Swedish biologist Stina Holmlund, and Hungarian physics genius Béla András Benedek, all of whom having discovered elements in the "real" world that point toward the existence of a parallel world. Jarvis Babbit decides to send the three scientists into "Paraworld", seemingly for an expedition. However, when the three heroes discover the true intentions of the SEAS, they have to rally all the parallel world's warring inhabitants in order to defeat the SEAS.

The three scientists serve as the game's core "hero" units. Their main goal is to return to their home world, but to do this they will need to enlist the aid of enlightened natives and battle against the hostile creatures, tribes, and ultimately the masterminds trying to stop them. Along the way they'll meet several characters who are seemingly based on classical scientists such as Nicola Tesla or Charles Darwin ("Nikolaj Taslow" and "James Warden" in the game). They eventually discover that a man named David Leighton, who is one of Babbit's men, is orchestrating events on the parallel world, and pursue him. They also learn of a plot to permanently seal the world away by moving the planet out of orbit, which will also trigger a cataclysm.

In order to save the planet and secure their own escape from ParaWorld, they are forced to assault Babbit's fortifications. They manage to stop the countdown and Cole kills Leighton in battle. Babbit makes a last-ditch effort to stop the heroes by using a giant robot. Having failed, Babbit falls into lava and presumably dies. The heroes finally go back home. However, Cole is awakened in the middle of the night by a phone call of Béla telling him that the dinosaurs have come through as well. The chaos of ParaWorld now ensues on planet Earth.

== Reception ==
Reception

Aggregate score
Aggregator	Score
Metacritic	71/100

Review scores
Publication	Score
1Up.com	C+
Computer Games Magazine	2/5
Eurogamer	5/10
Game Informer	7/10
GameSpot	6.2/10
GameZone	7.8/10
Hardcore Gamer	4/5
IGN	7.8/10
PALGN	6.5/10
PC Gamer (US)	70%

The game received "mixed or average reviews" according to the review aggregation website Metacritic.

The developing company SEK shut down due to insufficient sales, and Sunflowers ended their partnership with it. The previously announced expansion pack was cancelled. A German-only Booster Pack for the game was released with Gold GOTY Editions of ParaWorld, containing new maps, heroes, and missions, and was only compatible with German copies of the game. However, members of the ParaWorld gaming community "Para-Welt" have created an unofficial downloadable version of the Booster Pack for all regions that incorporates updated community content (such as modifications enabling players to utilise the previously NPC 'SEAS' factions) alongside the official SEK Booster Pack content. According to German newspaper Die Welt, ParaWorld was commercially unsuccessful, with sales of around 100,000 units.

== See also ==
- Dino-Riders
- Ark: Survival Evolved
- Ark: Survival Ascended
