= Anno 2070 =

2011 video game

- Developers: Related Designs; Blue Byte
- Publisher: Ubisoft
- Composers: Tilman Sillescu; Alexander Roeder; Markus Schmidt
- Series: Anno
- Platform: Microsoft Windows
- Release: EU: 17 November 2011; NA: 17 November 2011
- Genres: City-building; Real-time Strategy
- Modes: Single-player; Multiplayer

Anno 2070 is a city-building and economic simulation game, with real-time strategy elements. It is the 5th game of the Anno series. It was released on 17 November 2011, and was co-developed by the German studios Related Designs and Blue Byte, and published by Ubisoft. Anno 2070 required Uplay to operate as an always online DRM System, later removed for receiving severe criticism from players.

== Plot ==
The scenario is set in the year 2070. Global warming has melted the Arctic ice cap, which has raised the global sea level so that the coasts were flooded. As a result, many old cities have vanished under the ocean, and much of what was once highland has been turned into chains of new islands. Responsibility for settling and exploiting these new frontiers is given to a select group of people, who captain mobile ocean-going bases known as Arks.

The game has three factions: The Eden Initiative (referred to as the "Ecos"), Global Trust (referred to as the "Tycoons"), and the S.A.A.T. (referred to as the "Techs"). Ecos are environmental and build sustainable cities, but are inefficient and slow to expand. Tycoons are industrious and expand quickly, but have problems with pollution and dwindling resources. The Tech is a support faction available to the other two, and they are useful in researching the latest and most powerful technologies. The Techs are only available later in the game when 10,000 credits are donated to their cause.

== Gameplay ==
In Anno 2070, politics are no longer defined by countries, boundaries, religions, races, etc., but how humans choose to produce energy. All humankind rally under one global government where the three main factions of the game control the world's decisions. Players can also vote for a World President and vote in Senate Council. Participation will give different effects to all players, depending on who is president or what bill was passed, until the next cycle of voting begins. For example, voting for the Tycoons' CEO Skylar Banes will increase productivity of manufacturing buildings.

Players can also gain achievement and rewards from just playing the game. Players can customize their Ark to fit personal preference, which is only for aesthetics, as well as gaining special rewards that affect gameplay.

Resources and technology upgrades can be carried on Arks, and be used in another game in "Continuous Mode".

=== Events ===
The gameplay includes "World Events"; special missions offered only for a limited time, allowing all players to band together and complete the missions. Completing missions will reward players depending on how many people participate.

- First event: Neo Skullz Pirates - players answer the World Council's call to war against pirates who threaten humanity with nuclear missiles.
- Second event: Project Eden - players help the Eden Initiative activate "Former" technologies, which are high-performance air and water filtration systems, to fight pollution on islands.
- Third event: Global Distrust - players help the Global Trust to prevent a global recession by expanding trade and decrease taxes to attract more inhabitants.
- Fourth event: The Nordamark Conflict - players need to mediate a confrontation between Global Trust and Eden Initiative in a region called Nordamark with diplomats and a nuclear submarine, Orca.
- Fifth event: The Secret of the Ebashi Trench - players help the Tech faction to develop a geothermal power plant. This event is the prelude of the Deep Ocean expansion.

There are also "Current Events", where a player can complete a particular quest for one of the three factions to gain rewards. Current Events change daily, unlike World Events, which can be around for several months.

=== Factions ===
- Tycoon - Leader: Skylar Banes, CEO. This faction is representative of the Global Trust, Earth's number one leading energy supplier in 2070. Tycoons like to exploit resources quickly for immediate use, which leads to workers that are richer and can pay more taxes. The economy of a Tycoon player accelerates early in the game and declines gradually near the end, as their non-renewable resources run out (Tech's technologies can mitigate this setback however). In turn, Tycoons decrease the eco balance and affect the environment negatively. Tycoons rely on coal and nuclear plants for power, and their citizens enjoy hamburgers, wine and spending time at the Casino. Tycoon citizens do not worry about negative eco balance as much as their Eco counterparts, but they can gain benefits from positive eco balance. To increase eco balance, Tycoons can build, for example, CO_{2} reservoirs and waste compactors, but their techonogies are only capable of annulling the negative impact on environment, and cannot create positive ecobalance.
- Eco - Leader: Seamus Green, founder and spiritual leader. This faction is representative of the Eden Initiative, Earth's most influential environmental organization. Ecos rely on green technology to create their cities, which preserve nature and help the eco balance. Their cities are inefficient and slow to prosper, but Ecos' economy will be steady and reliable until the game's end. Ecos rely on wind and solar power, and their citizens enjoy drinking tea, eating health food and listening to orchestral music. Ecos are affected by negative eco balance more than Tycoons, but they can also benefit from a positive eco balance. To increase the eco balance, Ecos use ozone generators and weather changing stations, etc.
- Tech - Leader: F.A.T.H.E.R., super-intelligent AI. This faction is representative of the S.A.A.T. (Scientific Academy for Advanced Technologies), and are the supreme inventors of technology and masters of the underwater world. They designed the Ark and E.V.E. (the player's in-game advisor), as well as building plans for aircraft, submarines, and missiles. Tech is the only faction that can live and work underwater on submerged plateaus. Farming algae and mining diamonds are a few things they can do underwater. Tech can research hydroelectric dams for energy and utilize marine current power plants underwater. Their people are scientists and like to study in research buildings. To advance to a higher level, their citizens need algae processed food from underwater cities, and they like to drink energy drinks (made from coffee and sugar).

== Development ==
=== Digital rights management ===
The game was protected by Tagès SolidShield with a 3 machine activation limit and always needed to be connected to the Internet while playing the game. Changing hardware could use up one activation. After the last activation was used, 1 was regained every 30 days.

This generated wide criticism as legitimate players faced different problems with such online only systems. In 2012, Ubisoft decided to release a universal patch removing the online only DRM from several games including Anno 2070. The SolidShield DRM with its activation limit was entirely removed on July 8, 2020.

== Downloadable content ==
The first DLC packs were released on 13 February 2012:

- The Keeper Package - S.A.A.T. version of Former technology tool with unique skin as well as access to high-end upgrades.
- The Development Package - Two exclusive bonus missions on the history of Former technology and a new portrait of the inventor Josh "the Ghost" Steen.
- The Eden Series Package - Elaborate decorations for the Eco faction, like new Park Systems layouts, Flower Beds, Fountain, etc.

Three DLC packs were added on 26 March, these with a Tycoon theme in contrast to the previous Eco-themed DLCs:

- The Central Statistical Package - Global Trust skinned version of the Statistics Center building and all its upgrades.
- The Crisis Response Package - Two exclusive missions focused on restoring the Tycoon's former economic glory after a stock market crash.
- The Distrust Series Package - Ornamental, decorative buildings for the Tycoon faction, including underground Shopping Malls, Searchlights, Security Fences, etc.

Three DLC packs were added with the new World Event The Nordamark Conflict:

- The E.V.E. Package - Give a new portrait of EVE in red theme.
- The Silent Running Package - Give players access to a nuclear submarine Erebos, and its various upgrades.
- The Nordamark Line Package - Various harbor ornamental buildings are added, including a lighthouse which can change the time of day to dawn, noon, dusk, and night.

== Expansion ==
In October 2012, Ubisoft published an expansion to the game called Deep Ocean, which adds a new civilization level for the tech faction and new resources and products to satisfy that faction's new needs. It also offers a new energy source, the geothermal power plant, which may cause a new natural disaster: a tsunami. Five new campaign missions introduce these new features. It also adds many new factors to the game, which completely changes the way the game is played, most notably when playing with the Tech Faction.

Players who don't have the Deep Ocean expansion cannot play a multiplayer game with other players who do have the expansion unless the expansion is deactivated.

== Reception ==
Anno 2070

Aggregate scores
| Aggregator | Score |
|---|---|
| GameRankings | 84.77% |
| Metacritic | 83/100 |

Review scores
| Publication | Score |
|---|---|
| Destructoid | 9.0/10 |
| GameSpot | 8.5/10 |
| IGN | 8.5/10 |
| Canard PC | 8/10 |
| Eurogamer Italy | 9/10 |
| Eurogamer Portugal | 7/10 |

Critical reception for Anno 2070 has been positive since the game's release, with a majority of critics considering it a big step forward in the Anno series. Criticism of the game is heavily influenced by the requirement to be always online to access all game options. Without being online the player can still access an offline mode, but one can't edit their own profile information, and the player is unable to update their Ark base, place cargo into it, or upgrade it with equipment. Early reception at the time of release was also negatively influenced by constant crashes, server issues, and critics pointed out that the game worked better on pirated versions instead of the official one with Ubisoft server access.
