= List of city-building video games =

This is a list of city-building games, sorted chronologically. Information regarding date of release, developer, platform, setting and notability is provided when available. The table can be sorted by clicking on the small boxes next to the column headings.

== Legend ==
Video game platforms
3DO	3DO	AMI	Amiga	AQUA	Mattel Aquarius
ATRST	Atari ST, Atari Falcon	BBC	BBC Micro, Acorn Electron, BBC Master	DOS	PC DOS / MS-DOS, Windows 3.X
DROID	Android	DS	Nintendo DS, DSiWare, iQue DS	FMT	FM Towns
GBA	Game Boy Advance, iQue GBA	INT	Intellivision	iOS	iOS, iPhone, iPod, iPadOS, iPad, visionOS, Apple Vision Pro
LIN	Linux, SteamOS	MAC	Classic Mac OS, 2001 and before	MAIN	Mainframe computer
MOBI	Mobile phone	N64	Nintendo 64, iQue Player	NS	Nintendo Switch
OSX	macOS	PC98	PC-9800 series	PS1	PlayStation 1
PS2	PlayStation 2	PS4	PlayStation 4	PS5	PlayStation 5
PSP	PlayStation Portable	SAT	Sega Saturn	SNES	Super NES / Super Famicom / Super Comboy
WEB	Browser game	Wii	Wii, WiiWare, Wii Virtual Console	WIN	Windows, all versions Windows 95 and up
XB360	Xbox 360, Xbox 360 Live Arcade	XBO	Xbox One	XBX/S	Xbox Series X/S

== List ==
Year	Game	Developer	Setting	Platform	Notes
1964	The Sumerian Game	Mabel Addis	Historical	MAIN	Text-based game based on the ancient Sumerian city of Lagash.
1969	The Sumer Game	Richard Merrill	Historical	MAIN	Adaptation of The Sumerian Game.
1975	Hamurabi	David H. Ahl	Historical	MAIN	Expanded version of The Sumer Game. Published later as part of BASIC Computer Games.
1978	Santa Paravia en Fiumaccio	George Blank	Historical	MAIN	
1981	Kingdom	David Allen	Historical	BBC	A conversion of the game "Hamurabi", it was included as part of welcome package to BBC Microcomputers.
1982	Utopia	Don Daglow	Contemporary	AQUA, INT	
1989	SimCity	Maxis	Contemporary	AMI, MAC	First title in the SimCity series.
1990	ActRaiser	Quintet	Fantasy	MOBI, SNES, Wii	2D platform game mix.
1990	Moonbase	Wesson	Sci-fi	AMI, DOS	
1991	Utopia: The Creation of a Nation	Celestial	Sci-fi	AMI, DOS, SNES, ATRST	
1992	Caesar	Impressions	Historical	AMI, DOS, ATRST	First title in the City Building series.
1993	Lunar Command	Wesson	Sci-fi	DOS	Updated version of Moonbase.
1993	SimCity 2000	Maxis, Full Fat	Contemporary	AMI, DOS, GBA, MAC, N64, PS1, PSP, SAT, SNES	Sequel to SimCity.
1993	The Settlers (a.k.a. Serf City: Life is Feudal)	Blue Byte	Fantasy	AMI, DOS	First title in the series.
1993	Stronghold: Kingdom Simulator	Stormfront	Fantasy	DOS, FMT, PC98, WIN, LIN, OSX	Hybrid with RTS elements.
1994	Outpost	Sierra	Sci-fi	MAC, DOS	Sci-fi version of SimCity.
1994	The Horde	Toys for Bob	Fantasy	3DO, DOS, SAT, FMT, PC98	Action strategy; town-builder modes.
1995	Caesar II	Impressions	Historical	MAC, WIN	Sequel to Caesar.
1995	Lincity	Various	Contemporary		Open source clone of Sim City.
1995	SimIsle: Missions in the Rainforest	Intelligent	Contemporary	DOS, MAC	
1995	SimTown	Maxis	Contemporary	DOS, MAC, WIN	
1996	Afterlife	LucasArts	Fantasy	DOS, MAC, WIN	
1996	Holiday Island	Sunflowers	Contemporary	WIN	
1996	The Settlers II: Veni, Vidi, Vici	Blue Byte	Fantasy	AMI, DOS, DS, MAC	Sequel to The Settlers. Nintendo DS port was released in 2007. Amiga port was released in 2025.
1996	The Settlers II Mission CD	Blue Byte	Fantasy	DOS	Expansion to The Settlers II: Veni, Vidi, Vici.
1997	Constructor	System 3	Contemporary	PS1, WIN	
1998	Anno 1602: Creation of a New World	Max	Historical	WIN	First title in the series. RTS mix.
1998	Knights and Merchants: The Shattered Kingdom	Joymania Entertainment	Historical	WIN, LIN	Hybrid with RTS elements.
1998	Caesar III	Impressions	Historical	MAC, WIN	Sequel to Caesar II.
1998	The Settlers III	Blue Byte	Fantasy	WIN	Sequel to The Settlers II: Veni, Vidi, Vici.
1999	Alien Nations	Neo Software	Fantasy	WIN, MAC	Hybrid with RTS elements.
1999	Mobility	Glamus	Contemporary	WIN, LIN	
1999	Pharaoh	Impressions	Historical	WIN	
1999	SimCity 3000	Maxis	Contemporary	iOS, LIN, MAC, WIN	Sequel to SimCity 2000.
2000	Cleopatra: Queen of the Nile	Impressions	Historical	WIN	Expansion to Pharaoh.
2000	Cultures: Discovery of Vinland	Funatics Software	Fantasy	WIN, iOS	RTS mix.
2000	Master of Olympus: Zeus	Impressions	Fantasy	WIN	
2000	SimCity 64	HAL	Contemporary	N64	Spin-off of the SimCity series.
2000	SimCity 3000 Unlimited	Maxis	Contemporary	LIN, WIN	Re-release of SimCity 3000.
2000	StarPeace	Oceanus	Sci-fi	WIN	MMOG.
2001	Master of Atlantis: Poseidon	Impressions	Fantasy	WIN	Expansion to Master of Olympus: Zeus.
2001	The Nations	JoWooD Vienna	Fantasy	WIN	Sequel to Alien Nations. Hybrid with RTS elements.
2001	StarTopia	Mucky Foot	Sci-fi	WIN	
2001	Stronghold	Firefly Studios	Fantasy	WIN	Hybrid with RTS elements.
2001	The Settlers IV	Blue Byte	Fantasy	WIN	Sequel to The Settlers III.
2001	Tropico	PopTop	Contemporary	MAC, OSX, WIN	
2002	Cultures 2: The Gates of Asgard	Funatics Software	Fantasy	WIN	Sequel to Cultures.
2002	Emperor: Rise of the Middle Kingdom	BreakAway, Impressions	Historical	WIN	
2002	Metropolismania	Media Factory	Contemporary	PS2	First title in the series.
2002	Moonbase Commander	Humongous	Sci-fi	WIN	
2002	Stronghold: Crusader	Firefly Studios	Historical	WIN	Hybrid with RTS elements.
2002	Tropico: Paradise Island	BreakAway	Contemporary	WIN	Expansion to Tropico.
2003	Anno 1503: The New World	Max	Historical	WIN	Sequel to Anno 1602: Creation of a New World. RTS mix.
2003	Anno 1503: Treasures, Monsters and Pirates	Max	Historical	WIN	Expansion to Anno 1503: The New World.
2003	SimCity 4	Maxis	Contemporary	OSX, WIN	Sequel to SimCity 3000.
2003	SimCity 4: Rush Hour	Maxis	Contemporary	OSX, WIN	Expansion to SimCity 4.
2003	Tropico 2: Pirate Cove	Frog City	Historical	OSX, WIN	
2004	Immortal Cities: Children of the Nile	Tilted Mill	Historical	WIN	
2004	Outpost Kaloki X	NinjaBee	Sci-fi	WIN, XB360	
2005	Medieval Lords: Build, Defend, Expand	Monte Cristo	Historical	WIN	
2005	Stronghold 2	Firefly Studios	Fantasy	WIN	Hybrid with RTS elements.
2005	The Settlers: Heritage of Kings	Blue Byte	Fantasy	WIN	Sequel to The Settlers IV.
2005	The Settlers: Heritage of Kings - Expansion Disk	Blue Byte	Fantasy	WIN	Expansion to The Settlers: Heritage of Kings.
2005	The Settlers: Heritage of Kings - Legends Expansion Disk	Blue Byte	Fantasy	WIN	Expansion to The Settlers: Heritage of Kings.
2006	Anno 1701	Related	Historical	WIN	Sequel to Anno 1503: The New World. RTS mix.
2006	Caesar IV	Tilted Mill	Historical	WIN	Sequel to Caesar III.
2006	City Life	Monte Cristo	Contemporary	WIN, DS	
2006	CivCity: Rome	Firefly, Firaxis	Historical	WIN	
2006	Dwarf Fortress	Bay 12 Games	Fantasy	WIN, LIN, OSX	
2006	Glory of the Roman Empire	Haemimont	Historical	WIN	
2006	The Settlers II 10th Anniversary	Blue Byte	Fantasy	WIN	Remake of The Settlers II: Veni, Vidi, Vici.
2006	Stronghold Legends	Firefly Studios	Fantasy	WIN	Hybrid with RTS elements.
2006	Tycoon City: New York	Deep Red	Contemporary	WIN	
2007	Anno 1701: Dawn of Discovery	Keen	Historical	DS	Hybrid with RTS elements.
2007	Anno 1701: The Curse of the Dragon	Related	Historical	DS	Expansion to Anno 1701: Dawn of Discovery. RTS mix.
2007	SimCity DS	EA Japan, AKI Corporation	Contemporary	DS	
2007	SimCity Societies	Tilted Mill	Contemporary	MOBI, WIN	Spin-off of the SimCity series.
2007	The Settlers II: 10th Anniversary - The Vikings	Blue Byte	Fantasy	WIN	Expansion to The Settlers II (10th Anniversary).
2007	The Settlers: Rise of an Empire	Blue Byte	Fantasy	WIN	Sequel to The Settlers: Heritage of Kings.
2008	A Kingdom for Keflings	Ninja Bee	Fantasy	XB360	
2008	Final Fantasy Crystal Chronicles: My Life as a King	Square Enix	Fantasy	Wii	Hybrid with RPG elements.
2008	Hinterland	Tilted Mill	Fantasy	WIN	Hybrid with RPG elements.
2008	Imperium Romanum	Haemimont	Historical	WIN	Sequel to Glory of the Roman Empire.
2008	Micropolis	Don Hopkins	Contemporary		Open source version of SimCity.
2008	SimCity DS 2	EA Japan, AKI Corporation	Contemporary	DS, Wii	Aka SimCity Creator.
2008	SimCity Societies: Destinations	Tilted Mill	Contemporary	WIN	Expansion to SimCity Societies.
2008	The Settlers: Rise of an Empire - The Eastern Realm	Blue Byte	Fantasy	WIN	Expansion to The Settlers: Rise of an Empire.
2009	Anno 1404	Related, Ubisoft, Blue Byte	Historical	WIN, OSX, DS, Wii	Sequel to Anno 1701: Dawn of Discovery. RTS mix.
2009	Cities XL	Monte Cristo	Contemporary	WIN	
2009	Grand Ages: Rome	Haemimont	Historical	WIN	Sequel to Imperium Romanum.
2009	OpenCity	Duong-Khang Nguyen	Contemporary		Open source. A development version is available.
2009	Tropico 3	Haemimont Games	Contemporary	OSX, WIN, XB360	Successor to Tropico.
2010	A World of Keflings	Ninja Bee	Fantasy	XB360	
2010	Cities XL 2011	Focus Home Interactive	Contemporary	WIN	
2010	The Settlers 7: Paths to a Kingdom	Blue Byte	Fantasy	OSX, WIN	Sequel to The Settlers: Rise of an Empire.
2011	Anno 2070	Related Designs	Sci-fi	WIN	
2011	Cities XL 2012	Focus Home Interactive	Contemporary	WIN	
2011	MegaCity	ColePowered Games	Contemporary	iOS, XB360, DROID	Puzzler with city-building looks.
2011	Stronghold 3	Firefly Studios	Fantasy	WIN, OSX, LIN	Hybrid with RTS elements.
2011	Tropico 4	Haemimont Games	Contemporary	WIN, XB360, OSX	
2012	SimCity Social	Playfish, Maxis	Contemporary	WEB	Defunct online, social SimCity spin-off.
2012	Stronghold: HD	Firefly Studios	Historical	WIN	Modest enhancement of Stronghold (2001). RTS mix.
2012	The Simpsons: Tapped Out	EA Mobile	Parody	iOS, DROID	Freemium title. Delisted 2024.
2012	Towns	Xavi Canal, Ben Palgi	Fantasy	WIN, LIN, OSX	RPG hybrid with few influences. Abandoned in 2014.
2013	SimCity	Maxis	Contemporary	WIN, OSX	Relaunch of Simcity Series.
2014	Banished	Shining Rock Software	Historical	WIN	
2014	Lego Fusion Town Master	TT Games	Contemporary	iOS, DROID	Incorporates augmented reality with the Lego Fusion Town Master set. Retired in 2016.
2014	Stronghold Crusader II	Firefly Studios	Historical	WIN	Hybrid with RTS elements.
2014	Tropico 5	Haemimont Games	Contemporary	WIN, OSX, LIN, XB360, PS4	
2015	Anno 2205	Blue Byte	Sci-Fi	WIN	Sequel to Anno 2070.
2015	Cities: Skylines	Colossal Order	Contemporary	WIN, OSX, LIN, PS4, XBO, NS	Based on the engine used for Cities in Motion 2.
2015	Cities XXL	Focus Home Interactive	Contemporary	WIN	
2015	Concrete Jungle	ColePowered Games	Contemporary	WIN, OSX, iOS, DROID	City-planning deck-builder. Sequel to MegaCity.
2015	Planetbase	Madruga Works	Sci-fi	WIN, OSX, XBO, PS4	Survival city-builder.
2015	Valhalla Hills	Funatics Software	Mythology	WIN, LIN, OSX, XBO, PS4	City builder, RTS.
2016	Clockwork Empires	Gaslamp Games	Alternate History, Lovecraftian	WIN, OSX	Lovecraftian colony sim. Delisted 2019.
2017	Aven Colony	Mothership Entertainment	Sci-Fi	WIN, PS4, XBO	
2017	Block'hood	Plethora Project	Contemporary	WIN, LIN, OSX	Neighbourhood builder.
2017	Life is Feudal: Forest Village	Bitbox	Historical	WIN	Survival town builder.
2017	Kingdoms and Castles	Lion Shield	Fantasy	WIN, OSX, LIN, XBO, XBX/S, PS4, PS5	
2018	Frostpunk	11 bit studios	Sci-Fi	WIN, OSX, PS4, XBO	
2018	Judgment: Apocalypse Survival Simulation	Suncrash	Post-apocalypse, Demons	WIN	Colony sim & real-time tactics.
2018	Maia	Machine Studios	Hard sci-fi	WIN, LIN, OSX	Survival colony sim with a first person mode.
2018	Surviving Mars	Haemimont Games	Sci-Fi	WIN, OSX, LIN, PS4, XBO	
2019	Anno 1800	Blue Byte	Historical	WIN, XBX/S, PS5	Industrialization-age exploration building sim.
2019	Dawn of Man	Madruga Works	Historical	WIN, OSX	Prehistoric city builder. Eras: Paleolithic to the Iron Age.
2019	Islanders	Grizzly Games	Fantasy	WIN, OSX, LIN	Casual city builder with low-poly aesthetic.
2019	Outlanders	Pomelo Games	Contemporary	iOS, WIN	
2019	Rise of Industry	Dapper Penguin Studios	Historical	WIN, LIN, OSX	Tycoon sim with minimalist 3D graphics. Former name: Project Automata.
2019	Rise to Ruins	Raymond Doerr	Fantasy	WIN, OSX, LIN	Indie city-builder with survival and god game mix.
2019	Tropico 6	Limbic Entertainment	Contemporary	WIN, OSX, LIN, PS4, XBO	
2020	Before We Leave	Balancing Monkey Games	Sci-fi	WIN, OSX, NS, XBO, XBX/S, PS4, PS5	
2020	Per Aspera	Tlön Industries	Sci-fi	WIN	City-builder about terraforming Mars.
2020	Airborne Kingdom	The Wandering Band	Sci-fi	WIN, OSX, PS4, PS5, XBO, XBX/S, NS	Steampunk flying city.
2021	Actraiser Renaissance	Sonic Powered, Square Enix	Fantasy	iOS, DROID, NS, WIN, PS4	Big remaster of ActRaiser.
2021	Dice Legacy	DESTINYbit	Fantasy	WIN, NS, XBO, PS4, XBX/S, PS5	Roguelike survival with dice rolls.
2021	Endzone: A World Apart	Gentlymad Studios	Post-apocalypse	WIN, XBO, XBX/S, PS5	Post-apocalyptic survival city-builder.
2021	Nebuchadnezzar	Nepos Games	Historical	WIN, LIN	Set in Ancient Mesopotamia.
2021	Patron	Overseer Games	Historical	WIN	Survival city-builder.
2021	Stronghold: Warlords	Firefly Studios	Historical	WIN	Hybrid with RTS elements.
2021	Surviving the Aftermath	Iceflake Studios	Post-apocalypse	WIN, NS, PS4, XBO, XBX/S	Survival city-builder. Sequel to Surviving Mars.
2021	Townscaper	Oskar Stålberg	Fantasy	WIN, OSX, MOBI	Indie city-builder with a specially intuitive gameplay and interface.
2022	Floodland	Vile Monarch	Post-apocalypse	WIN	Survival city-builder.
2022	Ixion	Bulwark Studios	Sci-fi	WIN, PS5, XBX/S	
2022	Urbek City Builder	Estudios Kremlinois	Contemporary	WIN, PS4, PS5, XBX/S, NS	Puzzle aspects with voxels.
2023	Against the Storm	Eremite Games	Dark fantasy	WIN	Roguelike.
2023	Aquatico	Digital Reef Games	Historical	WIN	
2023	Cities: Skylines II	Colossal Order, Iceflake Studios	Contemporary	WIN	Sequel to Cities: Skylines.
2023	Pharaoh: A New Era	Triskell Interactive	Historical	WIN	Remake of Pharaoh.
2023	The Settlers: New Allies	Ubisoft Düsseldorf	Fantasy	WIN, NS, PS4, PS5, XBO, XBX/S	Reboot of The Settlers series.
2023	Stranded: Alien Dawn	Haemimont Games	Sci-fi	WIN, XBO, PS4, PS5, XBX/S	Survival sim.
2023	SteamWorld Build	The Station	Sci-fi	WIN, NS, XBO, XBX/S, PS4, PS5	Steampunk city-builder.
2024	Bulwark Evolution: Falconeer Chronicles	Tomas Sala (Person)	Fantasy	WIN, LIN, XBO, PS4, PS5, XBX/S	Open world builder.
2024	Frostpunk 2	11 Bit Studios	Alternate history	WIN, PS5, XBX/S	Sequel to Frostpunk.
2024	Olympics Go! Paris 2024	Nvizzio Creations	Contemporary	WIN, iOS, DROID	Sports game mix. Based on 2024 Summer Olympics.
2024	Summerhouse	Friedemann Allmenröder	Contemporary	WIN, OSX	Open-ended sandbox game.
2024	Tiny Glade	Pounce Light	Historical	WIN, LIN	Medieval, cosy diorama builder.
2024	Workers & Resources: Soviet Republic	3Division	Historical	WIN	City builder with a focus on a communist economic system.
2025	Anno 117: Pax Romana	Ubisoft Mainz	Historical	WIN, PS5, XBX/S	Sequel to Anno 1800. RTS mix.
2025	Builders of Egypt	Strategy Labs	Historical	WIN	Ancient Egypt setting. Covers full pharaonic Egypt history.
2025	Foundation	Polymorph Games	Historical	WIN	Medieval indie city-builder.
2025	Kaiserpunk	Overseer Games	Alt-Historical	WIN	Grand strategy mix.
2026	Going Medieval	Foxy Voxel	Alt-Historical	WIN	Colony management sim set in 14th century
2025	Flotsam	Pajama Llama Games	Post-apocalypse	WIN	Survival town builder on water.
TBA	Infection Free Zone	Jutsu Games	Post-apocalypse	WIN	Survival city-builder.
TBA	Manor Lords	Slavic Magic	Historical	WIN, XBO, XBX/S	City-building & real-time tactics.
TBA	The Wandering Village	Stray Fawn	Sci-fi	WIN, LIN, OSX, XBO, XBX/S	Mobile city-builder.
TBA	Timberborn	Mechanistry	Fantasy, Futuristic	WIN, OSX	Beaver colony.

== See also ==
- List of business simulation video games
- List of roller coaster related video games
- List of simulation video games
