= Lords of the Realm =

1994 video game

- Developer: Impressions Games
- Publisher: Impressions Games
- Director: David Lester
- Producer: Christopher J. Foster
- Designers: Christopher J. Foster; David Lester
- Programmer: Simon Bradbury
- Artist: Chris Beatrice
- Composer: Jason P. Rinaldi
- Platforms: MS-DOS, Amiga
- Release: June 15, 1994
- Genres: Turn-based strategy, Real-time tactics
- Modes: Single-player, multiplayer

Lords of the Realm is a turn-based strategy computer game published and developed by Impressions Games. It was first released on June 15, 1994, and is the first game in the Lords of the Realm series, which would grow to include Lords of the Realm II, Lords of Magic, and Lords of the Realm III.

== Summary ==
The game takes place in a medieval setting, with several characters warring for the right to be either King of England or King of Germany. Players manage their armies as well as their land and population, build and lay siege to castles, and generally attempt to crush their enemies.

Battles between armies take place in a real-time environment, similar to real-time strategy games, with players able to control individual units as well as control them as a group, during which units group into formations. Players may also choose to allow the computer to determine the outcome of the battle. The game also features a small castle-building portion.

== Release ==
The game was published by Impressions Games in the UK (Amiga) and US (DOS) both in 1994. It was distributed by Sierra On-Line Ltd. in the UK (Windows) in 1997, DMV Daten- und Medienverlag GmbH & Co. KG. in Germany (DOS) in 1997, and Axel Springer Polska Sp. z o.o. in Poland (DOS) in 2001.

In the Crucial Entertainment CD release of Lords of the Realm, the game came bundled with a 34-page PDF book of England Under Edward 1 written by Jennifer Hawthorne. This work described English history, ranging from the Norman Conquest through to the reign of King Edward I.

== Critical reception ==
Reception

Review scores
Publication	Score
AllGame	4.5/5 (PC)
Next Generation	4/5 (PC)
The One	84% (Amiga)

A reviewer for Next Generation deemed Lords of the Realm a must-have title for strategy fans, citing the randomized events, genuine challenge, impressive rendered cut scenes, player-controlled battles, and overall diverse gameplay.

In a retrospective review, Michael House of Allgame wrote, "Whatever faults can be attributed to the game's mechanics or contents are almost uniformly minor and in most instances an error of omission. From structure to game play, Lords of the Realm has notched its own place in wargaming history." The Escapist's Stew Shearer summed up his review with "Lords of the Realm is a stellar strategy game that's more than worth the $5.99 that GOG is asking for it (and Lords of the Realm 2) [sic]. It can have moments where things feel a bit too slow, but overall it's a fantastic experience that fans of the genre would be remiss to skip over".

Lords of the Realm was a nominee for Computer Gaming World's 1994 "Strategy Game of the Year" award, which ultimately went to X-COM: UFO Defense. The editors called Lords "so fresh in its approach, it even makes animal husbandry fun." PC Gamer US presented Lords of the Realm with its 1994 "Best Historical Simulation" award. The editors wrote that it "strikes a delicate balance between micro- and macro-management—and the result is one of the richest historical sims ever."

The One gave the Amiga version of Lords of the Realm an overall score of 84%, praising the game's controls, and stating "Presentation is excellent throughout, making good use of drag bars to make sure you always know exactly what's going on ... everything looks neat and pretty" and referring to the sound effects as "charming". The One compared the combat to Fields of Glory, remarking that Lords of the Realm requires more strategy and careful placement of troops, and compared the farming sections of the game to Genesia.

== Sequels ==
Lords of the Realm was followed up by three sequels: Lords of the Realm II in 1996 (which included an expansion pack), Lords of Magic in 1997 and Lords of the Realm III in 2004.
