= The Rise & Rule of Ancient Empires =

1996 video game

- Developer: Impressions Games
- Publisher: Sierra On-Line
- Producer: Gregor Koomey
- Designer: Gregor Koomey
- Programmers: Mike Gingerich; Tony Hosier; Dean Lawson
- Artist: Chris Beatrice
- Composer: Keith Zizza
- Platform: Microsoft Windows
- Release: NA: March 25, 1996
- Genres: 4X, Turn-based strategy, City-building
- Modes: Single-player, multiplayer

The Rise & Rule of Ancient Empires is a 1996 empire-building strategy game developed by Impressions Games and published by Sierra On-Line. In it, the player is able to choose from six civilizations: the Celts, Egyptians, Chinese, Greeks, Indians, and Akkadians. Much of the focus of the game was building cities and armies. Each city had several buildings that could be upgraded, including a temple, a barracks, and a wall. Like the Civilization franchise, each city produced military units that would take turns exploring the map. It was considered "somewhat slower-paced than Civilization II and gets a bit dull on occasion", but easier for novice gamers as an introduction to the empire-building format. After release, it appeared in best-seller lists for the United States from the week ending April 27 to the week ending May 25.

== Critical reception ==
Reception to "The Rise & Rule of Ancient Empires"

Review scores
Publication	Score
Computer Gaming World	40
GameRevolution	16
GameSpot	62
Computer Game Review	87
PC Gameplay (Benelux)	70
PC Games (Germany)	56
Power Play (DE)	54
PC Player (Germany)	40

The game received mixed to positive reviews.

In Computer Game Review, Scott Gehrs concluded, "I found the action to be slow at first, but still interesting, and the activity of building my empire quite an enjoyable task." GameSpot said "Openly taking on Civilization 2 (Civ 2), the folks at Impressions have taken loads of interesting cultural information, fantastic sound and graphics, and full network support and combined them in a title that is full of atmosphere and life, but slightly lacking in its strategy content".

Computer Gaming World (CGW) said "Once you leave your gleaming cities in RISE AND RULE, the game starts to break down and becomes both too simple and too tedious to hold the attention of the average gamer. There are plenty of nice touches, but early on somebody should have made the decision whether this game was meant to challenge CIV at its own level of detail, or go the quick-and-dirty route, like a historical SPACEWARD HO! Sadly, in trying to do both, RISE AND RULE achieves neither, and becomes yet another strategy near-miss from Sierra. In a universe with CIVNET or CIVILIZATION II, what is the point?".

Game Revolution wrote "This game is recommended for those who are lonely enough to spend hours dwelling in front of a computer trying to figure out why Sierra would chance losing its reputation for good games. Others who should play this game are those that suffer from insomnia; this may be the cure. Personally, the only reason I found myself playing this game so intently was to find the true meaning behind Sierra's less-than-par attempt at a strategic game."
