= Space Bucks =

1996 video game

- Developer(s): Impressions Games
- Publisher(s): Sierra On-Line
- Designer(s): David Lester
- Programmer(s): Thanh Pham; Chris Gurski
- Artist(s): Chris Beatrice; Dennis Rose
- Composer(s): Jay Rinaldi; Jeremy A. Bell; Keith Zizza
- Platform(s): Windows 3.x
- Release: 1996
- Genre(s): Simulation video game
- Mode(s): Single-player

Space Bucks was a space trading simulation developed by Impressions Games and published by Sierra On-Line. The game focuses on the creation of a trade empire against several computer controlled opponents. Victory is achieved through a combination of infrastructure investments, the stock market, piracy, sabotage, and of course trade goods.

== Plot ==
In the year 2375, Humans share the galaxy with four other races, the Colikars, Tesarians, Secanii, and the Krec N'had. Your fledgling trading company, consisting of a single port and a single ship, must, by the year 2500, expand by any means necessary to become the dominant trade empire in the galaxy. Three computer opponents will be pursuing the same goal.

== Gameplay ==
There are numerous mechanics for the player to utilize in order to achieve victory.

=== Ships ===
Ships do the heavy lifting in the game. Without ships, the goods produced at planets can't be transported and the highest level goods can't be manufactured due to a lack of the appropriate resources. At the start of the game only a few ship types are available. As the game progresses new, more advanced ship types become available.

Ships have several stats which determine its suitability for use. Range, Speed, Capacity, Efficiency, Drive, and Maintenance cost.

=== Planets ===
Planets generate all of the trade goods in the galaxy. These goods range from food, to passengers, to luxury goods. The higher in development a planet is, the more and the greater the variety of goods that are produced. Once the highest levels of development can be reached the most expensive, and thus profitable, goods can be manufactured.

To gain access to a planet, a bid must be made on a planet which does not already have a deal with another trade company. The player must open negotiations with such a planet and if their demands are agreed to, they will ally themselves with the players trade company. The demands include a monthly rent paid by the player, the delivery of a specified good at regular intervals, and an agreement to build a specified piece of infrastructure on the planet within a certain timeframe. The demand for monthly rent is made for every planet, with the other two demands being optional and dependent on the developmental level of the planet.

Planets have morale which can be modified by in-game factors. Investing in planetary infrastructure can often help improve the morale of a planet and ensure docking rights are not lost. Should a planet be lost to an unhappy local populace, the player must begin negotiations for docking rights again. The higher the developmental level of the planet, the more infrastructure will be needed to keep the planet happy.

=== Trade Goods ===
Trade goods include fuel, food, passengers, and exotic goods such as wine and weapons. Each race produces different high-end goods than it consumes.

=== Stock Market ===
Each trading company has stock which can be sold on the market for an infusion of cash. Buying out the competition, by accumulating a majority of their stock, is possible. Stock can be bought and sold throughout the game, making it possible to sell lots of stock early for an early boost and then buy it back when the other companies sell off the shares they own.

=== Piracy ===
Pirates can be hired to harass the competition. They can be paid to harass the player as well. When a pirate attacks there are only a couple of options, pay them off, try to run, or fight back. The correct action to take will depend heavily on the specific ship being threatened and the upgrades that it has been outfitted with.

=== Sabotage ===
Sabotage missions can be undertaken to hurt the competitions bottom line. Of course the competition can do the same to the player.

=== News Events ===
A very basic mechanic, News Events inform the player of all the important events such as new ships, engines, or weapon systems which have become available. Sudden changes in the markets may also be announced throughout the game, giving the player the chance to make a quick profit.

== Critical reception ==
A reviewer for Next Generation focused on the lack of anything to do in the game besides bid for landing rights and choose cargo: "No cut-throat strategy for undermining the competition's prices, no sabotage of trading routes, no space battles - not even the occasional price war." He recommended that players get "much better" business sims such as Transport Tycoon or Capitalism instead, and gave it 1 out of 5 stars. World Village (Gamer's Zone) wrote "The plot was a little thin for my taste, but if reading the business section of the paper excites you, then this game would be a must for you. The main weakness that I see in this program is lack of originality. I see parts of Railroad Tycoon, Civilization, Sim City among others, as well as the obvious connection to Air bucks v1.2. Nothing wrong with recycling older programs, especially as hardware improvements allow the newer versions to make improvements on game performance. That is what happened with this game. Unfortunately, it has a rushed feeling and fails to capitalize on the improvements there were put in the game." Computer Gaming World said "If you love to create ornate moving sculptures that generate endless money but do very little else interesting, then SPACE BUCKS will have some appeal for you. Set at its hardest level, the game offers two or three hours of challenge before your empire grows to the point that nothing can really harm it and you simply sit around absorbing planets from your competitors and doing more and more unwieldy upgrades to your entire fleet. Other than that, it is pretty to look at, but definitely no AIR BUCKS in Space." Computer Games Magazine wrote "Dealing with manufacturing, the bank and stock market, and random events do add a few things (bowling pins and knives?), but there still aren't a lot of different things to do (as in, say, Sim City or Capitalism). Despite this, you have to watch these things very closely, and it is easy for things to go critical very quickly. At the beginner level I played (and quickly lost) four games before I'd gotten a business that was even barely stable (and I was at the bottom of the pack). Maybe I just don't have a nose for business, but my attention wasn't strongly held. Beginning business sim fans might get more out of Space Bucks than I did, but I suspect advanced gamers will want to stick with a more detailed game like Capitalism."
