= Lords of the Realm II =

1996 video game

- North American cover art
- Developer: Impressions Games
- Publisher: Sierra On-Line
- Director: Chris Beatrice
- Producer: Eric Ouellette
- Designers: David Lester; Chris Beatrice; Simon Bradbury; Eric Ouellette
- Programmer: Simon Bradbury
- Composer: Keith Zizza
- Platforms: DOS, Windows, Macintosh
- Release: NA: 20 November 1996; EU: 13 December 1996
- Genres: Turn-based strategy, Real-time strategy
- Modes: Single-player, multiplayer

Lords of the Realm II is a 1996 video game developed by Impressions Games and published by Sierra On-Line for DOS, Microsoft Windows and Macintosh. The second title in the Lords of the Realm series, it is a medieval-themed strategy video game in which players compete with feuding lords to control the counties of a kingdom. Gameplay consists of turn-based resource management of villages and castles on a map, and real-time battles and sieges. Lead designer David Lester stated that the pairing of these game modes aimed to combine features of various contemporary strategy games, and make the game more accessible and appealing to multiplayer play.

Upon release, Lords of the Realm II received generally favourable reviews, and was one of the highest-selling computer games of 1997 and 1998. Critics praised its medieval theme and the combination of real-time and turn-based gameplay, whilst expressing mixed views about the depth of gameplay across the two modes, the artificial intelligence, and the strategic options available in the real-time combat mode. An expansion pack, Siege Pack, was released in June 1997, and a sequel, Lords of the Realm III, in 2004.

== Gameplay ==

Turn-based strategy gameplay is played on a map in an isometric perspective, whilst battles are played in real-time using a top-down perspective.

Lords of the Realm II is set in Europe during the medieval era in 1268 under an alternate history where a king dies without an heir. The objective of the game is to defeat other competing claimants to the throne. Gameplay is divided between a turn-based map mode, and battles played in a real-time combat mode. Maps, viewed in an isometric perspective, are divided into up to ten counties controlled by two to five players. Players must manage the economy of each county independently, defend their borders, and conquer other counties to win the game. In the single-player mode, players select one of 24 maps, and adjust the difficulty and number of competing opponents.

Players must engage in resource management to maintain food for their counties and support armies. Food is cultivated from grain or cows. Resources are harvested from mining, smithing, foresting, and farming, and production methods for these resources can be turned on or off. Resources can be bought and sold from travelling merchants, and blacksmiths create weapons from raw materials. Players can divide labour between production of food and production of industry resources using a sliding scale, or micromanage the allocation of labor in more detail. Populations in a county have a "happiness" measure maintained by factors such as tax rates or an adequate supply of food. If happiness is low, peasants in a county can riot; if food is low, they can die or emigrate to other counties. Random events can affect the population and food supply, such as the Black Death or drought respectively.

Military units are recruited in an armory by conscripting a selected number of peasants from a county's population. Units are recruited as peasants, but can be upgraded to other classes such as knights, archers and pikemen if players have corresponding weaponry. Combat is initiated by guiding troops on the main map to intercept enemy armies, towns or castles. Counties can have their defences upgraded from stone and iron resources, including a palisade, motte and bailey, keep, stone castle or royal castle. Players can engage in diplomacy to send gifts to competitors and create alliances.

When battle commences, players can choose to automatically resolve the battle, or enter the real-time combat mode. In the real-time battle mode, opposing forces begin on opposite ends of a map, which can include terrain features or defences if one force is besieging the other. Players use point and click controls to highlight selected units and issue simple commands, such as to move to a location, to flee, or to target remaining units on a map. Siege weapons and defences can also be constructed, including siege towers, catapults, battering rams and boiling oil. Combat can be paused and unpaused.

Lords of the Realm II also features a multiplayer mode, with two- to four-player play over a modem or local area network. Starting conditions for players can be set, and time limits can be placed for how long players can take to complete a turn.

== Development ==
Lords of the Realm II was developed by Impressions Games as a sequel to their 1994 title Lords of the Realm. Publisher Sierra announced the game in 1996 following acquisition of publishing rights for Impressions Games titles. Impressions Games general manager and lead designer David Lester stated that the design of the sequel was inspired by the desire to merge components of contemporary strategy games, including turn-based features of Civilization, and the real-time gameplay of Warcraft II: Tides of Darkness and Command & Conquer. The aim of development was to merge "visceral" combat with in-depth strategy mechanics. The combination of turn-based and real-time strategy was also intended to make the series "more multiplayer friendly". To "reduce the learning curve of the game dramatically", aspects of the economic simulation were streamlined, with slider bars introduced to automate aspects of gameplay, so that players interested in battles could focus on the real-time combat. Sierra composer Keith Zizza created the soundtrack. Online play was available on the Sierra Internet Gaming System service operated by Sierra parent company CUC International.

In November 1997, Impressions Games announced the Lords: Royal Collection, containing Lords of the Realm I and II, its expansion Siege Pack, and a demo for a fantasy spin-off title, Lords of Magic. A sequel, Lords of the Realm III, was developed by Impressions Games and published by Vivendi Universal in 2004.

=== Lords of the Realm II: Siege Pack ===
Lords of the Realm II: Siege Pack
- Developer: Impressions Games
- Publisher: Sierra On-Line
- Platforms: DOS, Windows, Macintosh
- Release: 10 June 1997
- Mode: Single-player

Lords of the Realm II: Siege Pack is an expansion pack for Lords of the Realm II developed by Impressions and released by Sierra in June 1997. The expansion adds 20 scenarios and battle maps, new online networking features via the Sierra Internet Gaming System, and a one-on-one Skirmish mode. Players can also select starting units in a map by using a points system, and receive scores and ranks. An editor including new designs for maps and castles is also included. The pack was announced for release by Sierra in June 1997.

== Reception ==
=== Sales ===
Lords of the Realm II peaked in ninth position on PC Data sales charts in January 1997. It was listed by the firm as the 14th highest-selling computer game of 1997, and the 19th of 1998. David Lester stated that the game sold 2.5 million copies worldwide.

=== Critical reception ===
Reception

Aggregate score
Aggregator	Score
Metacritic	77%

Review scores
Publication	Score
AllGame	4.5/5
Computer Gaming World	4/5
GameSpot	7.6/10
Hyper	85%
Next Generation	4/5
PC Gamer (UK)	79%
PC Games (US)	A−
PC Zone	80% / 75%
PCMag	4/5

According to review aggregator website Metacritic, Lords of the Realm II received "generally favorable" reviews. Several critics praised the combination of turn-based and real-time strategy gameplay, although some felt the modes conflicted with each other or would not both appeal to strategy players. The turn-based mode was praised: Next Generation viewed its emphasis on economic management as "plausible" and "realistic" and gave it a "sense of the dynamics of ruling", and PCMag described it as "very well-designed". Critics disagreed on the level of difficulty. Some viewed it to be accessible and easy to learn, and others wrote that the management of resources could be strategic and challenging, with PC Zone writing about its "steep learning curve". PC Gamer critiqued the game, writing that its strategy gameplay lacked depth due to the omission of different play styles, nations to play, or a technology tree.

The real time combat mode of Lords of the Realm II received a mixed reception. PC Games praised this mode as "exciting" and executed with "energy, ease and visual panache". The artificial intelligence was faulted; Next Generation found the tactics of the computer in sieges "inept", and Computer Gaming World described it as easy to exploit and lacking in strategy in its response to players. Some reviewers considered the combat system lacked options or unit types, with PC Zone writing that it "could be easier and allow for more strategic control". The UK version of PC Gamer faulted the real-time combat a "major flaw" of the game, writing that "once you've seen one siege you've seen them all".

Reviewers were divided on the game's visual presentation. Next Generation found the graphics "excellent" and highlighted the changes of the map based on the seasons of gameplay. Hyper wrote that the graphics were an improvement on the original, but felt they were "stock-standard" and "adequate" compared to its contemporaries. Critics also generally appreciated the medieval theme, with PC Zone considering it addressed an era that had not received much exposure in video games, and Computer Gaming World similarly appreciating the setting, although finding its representation was "half hearted" and expressed that the addition of historical names, designs and heraldry could have made the game more realistic. Similarly, PC Games felt some voice acting was more suited to the theme than others.

The Siege Pack was also received favorably. Praising the expansion as giving the game a "whole new lease of life", Ultimate PC considered the Siege Pack to be good value for players interested in its multiplayer features, but felt it did not improve underlying problems with the computer artificial intelligence during battles. Computer Game Entertainment wrote the expansion was good value for money and that it would "substantially" increase the lifespan of the game, but experienced bugs operating the editor. PC Games awarded the title runner-up for the best commercial add-on for 1997.

=== Retrospective reception ===
PC Gamer listed Lords of the Realm II as one of the best games of 1997 and the 38th best computer game of all time, praising its "hectic real-time battles" and combination of real-time and turn-based strategy. In 2001, it continued to praise its fusion gameplay, which it described as "original and thrilling" and "incredibly innovative". Computer Gaming World listed the game as one of the best strategy titles of 1996. Praising it as an "authentic historical experience", IGN enjoyed its combination of tactical and strategic gameplay; whilst finding its real-time mode was fun to play, they considered it "far less usable and manageable" than other titles of its era.
