= Chris Beatrice =

American video game designer and artist

- Occupations: Video game designer, artist
- Years active: 1994–present
- Employers: Impressions Games; Tilted Mill Entertainment
- Known for: Lords of the Realm series City Building series.
- Children: 1

Chris Beatrice is a video game designer and artist noted for primary creative development of popular historical strategy games, including Lords of the Realm series and the City Building series.

Beatrice worked at Sierra Entertainment's Impressions Games studio as art and creative director, director of design and development, and general manager. In 2001 he founded Tilted Mill Entertainment as President and Director of Development.

== Game development roles ==
- Detroit (1994) – artist
- Lords of the Realm (1994) – art director
- Front Lines (1994) – art director
- Caesar II (1995) – art director
- Breach 3 (1995) – art director
- Ultimate Soccer Manager (1995) – art director
- High Seas Trader (1995) – art director
- Casino Deluxe (1995) – art director
- Robert E. Lee: Civil War General (1996) – art director
- Space Bucks (1996) – art director
- The Rise & Rule of Ancient Empires (1996) – art director
- Lords of the Realm II (1996) – creative director, designer
  - Lords of the Realm II: Siege Pack (1997) – creative director, designer
- Grant, Lee, Sherman: Civil War Generals 2 (1997) – creative director
- Lords of Magic (1997) – creative director, lead designer
- Pharaoh (1999) – lead designer
- Zeus: Master of Olympus (2000) – lead designer
  - Poseidon: Master of Atlantis (2001) – director
- Immortal Cities: Children of the Nile (2004) – lead designer
- Caesar IV (2006) – lead designer
- SimCity Societies (2007) – lead designer
  - SimCity Societies: Destinations (2008) – designer
- Mosby's Confederacy (2008) – artist

== Education ==
- Joseph P. Keefe Vocational high school (drawing, illustration, graphic design)
- Massachusetts College of Art (sculpture)

== Book illustration ==
Beatrice illustrated Oscar Wilde's classic fairy tale, The Selfish Giant (Noteworthy Books, 2011, ISBN 978-0-9830038-0-9).

== See also ==
- Video game developers
