= Rise to Ruins =

- Developer: Raymond Doerr
- Publisher: SixtyGig Games
- Platforms: Microsoft Windows, OS X, Linux
- Release: WW: 27 October 2014 (Steam Early Access) 14 October 2019
- Genres: City-building, strategy
- Mode: Single-player

Rise to Ruins (formerly Retro-Pixel Castles) is a city-building strategy video game developed by Raymond Doerr and published by his independent company, SixtyGig Games, for Microsoft Windows, OS X, and Linux. The game was released into Steam Early Access on 27 October 2014.

== Gameplay ==
Rise to Ruins is a city-building strategy game with pixelated design, survival and god game elements, and influences from the video games Towns, Gnomoria, Warcraft, Banished, and Dwarf Fortress.

== Development ==
Rise to Ruins is being developed by Raymond Doerr for publication by his independent company, SixtyGig Games. The game exceeded its crowdfunding goal of US$5,000 by raising US$10,163 in 2014 on Kickstarter. The game was greenlit through Steam Greenlight and released into Steam Early Access, for Microsoft Windows, OS X, and Linux, on 27 October 2014.

As of July 2018, the game was still in development and received regular updates up to several times a month.

The game was fully released in October 2019.
