= Pharaoh: A New Era =

2023 video game

- Developer: Triskell Interactive
- Publisher: Dotemu
- Series: City Building
- Platform: Windows
- Release: WW: February 15, 2023
- Genre: City-building
- Mode: Single-player

Pharaoh: A New Era is a city-building video game designed by Triskell Interactive and published by Dotemu. It is a remake of Pharaoh (1999).

== Gameplay ==
Players build a city in ancient Egypt. As a remake, the game closely follows the original. The graphics are updated, and players can zoom in to view them up close. Normally, recruiters go house to house looking for unemployed people to assign to jobs. A New Era can optionally bypass recruiters and recruit workers from a global pool, like in Zeus: Master of Olympus. A New Era also tracks the Nile's flood season.

== Development ==
After Triskell Interactive pitched a city-building game to Dotemu, Dotemu asked them if they would be interested in remaking a game in the City Building series. Triskell chose Pharaoh, and Dotemu licensed it from Activision. Dotemu released Pharaoh: A New Era on February 15, 2023.

== Reception ==
Reception

Aggregate scores
| Aggregator | Score |
|---|---|
| Metacritic | 76/100 |
| OpenCritic | 69% recommend |

Pharaoh: A New Era received positive reviews from critics on Metacritic. Rock Paper Shotgun said that although it lacks some of the complexity of modern games, it is "the definitive version of a stone-cold classic". NPR encountered several bugs and thought the new graphics looked too much like a mobile game, but they said it "is still a rewarding city-builder". Gamepressure said the remake is "a splendid opportunity to rediscover this timeless classic", though they found some of the user interface elements to need improvement. Shacknews felt some of the gameplay was archaic but overall called it "an excellent spin on a classic".
