= Mosby's Confederacy (video game) =

2008 video game

- Developer(s): Tilted Mill Entertainment
- Publisher(s): Tilted Mill Entertainment
- Designer(s): Matt Zimmitti
- Platform(s): Windows
- Release: November 19, 2008
- Genre(s): turn based strategy real time tactics
- Mode(s): Single player

Mosby's Confederacy is a 2008 turn based strategy and real time tactics video game by Tilted Mill Entertainment.

== Overview ==
In Mosby’s Confederacy the player plays as John S. Mosby and commands small bands of skirmishers, scouts and guerilla fighters on opportunistic missions to scout, ambush, steal supplies and harass larger and better armed forces of Union soldiers.

== Development ==
Mosby's Confederacy was first announced for development on October 6, 2008, with a release date set tentatively for later in the fall. Tilted Mill stated in an interview that the game would be downloadable in the same vein as their fantasy RPG-village building game Hinterland.
