= Caesar (video game) =

1992 video game

- North American cover art
- Developer: Impressions Games
- Publisher: Sierra On-Line
- Designer: David Lester
- Programmer: Simon Bradbury
- Artists: Jon Baker; Erik Casey
- Composer: Christopher J. Denman
- Series: City Building
- Platforms: Amiga, Atari ST, MS-DOS
- Release: October 12, 1992
- Genre: City-building
- Mode: Single-player

Caesar is a 1992 city-building video game published by Sierra On-Line in which the player undertakes the role of a Roman governor, building ancient Roman cities.

Released in 1992 on the Amiga and ported the following year to Atari ST, PC and Macintosh, the game is similar to SimCity. In addition to similar graphics and user interfaces, it also came with issues of micromanagement, including complicated city-planning requirements such as building the right number of schools, theaters, libraries, bathhouses, and other amenities within suitable distances of residential areas.

An updated version, Caesar Deluxe, was released in 1993 for the Amiga. Caesar spawned three direct sequels and several spin-offs set in other ancient civilizations, which are together known as the City Building series.

== Reception ==
According to Sierra On-Line, combined sales of Caesar and Caesar II surpassed 400,000 units by the end of March 1996.

In June 1993, Computer Gaming World recommended Caesar to SimCity fans who "wished for more buttons to push, knobs to adjust and wires to reroute". The magazine concluded that "Caesar provides that rare quality in strategy gaming — an experience whose rewards prove equal to its challenges ... [it] provides the serious player with a real lion's feast". A survey of pre-20th-century strategy games in the issue gave the game three-plus stars out of five, calling it "More of a game than a simulation, but it can be fun".

Caesar and its sequel were named, collectively, the 96th best computer game ever by PC Gamer UK in 1997. The editors wrote, "Impressions keep on keeping on with the likes of Lords of the Realm [...] but have never managed to regain the dizzy peak they climbed with their handsome brace of think-'em-ups."

== Sequels ==
Caesar was developed and designed by Impressions Games and distributed by Sierra On-Line. Impressions also developed another Roman-themed game, Cohort 2, at the same time, which allowed players to direct ancient Roman battles in a style akin to a crude precursor of the Command & Conquer series. Impressions included a feature in Cohort 2, which allowed players of Caesar to load their saved files and play out the battles from Caesar in Cohort 2. Later, Impressions released an updated version of Caesar, which automatically launched a version of Cohort 2 whenever the player engaged in battle. This version was released under the title Caesar Deluxe in 1994.

Impressions released the sequels Caesar II in 1995 and Caesar III in 1998. A third sequel, Caesar IV, was announced in August 2005 by Tilted Mill Entertainment and was subsequently released on September 26, 2006.
