= Caesar III =

1998 video game

- Developer: Impressions Games
- Publisher: Sierra Studios
- Producer: Eric Ouellette
- Designer: David Lester
- Programmer: Simon Bradbury
- Artist: Darrin Horbal
- Composer: Robert L. Euvino
- Series: City Building
- Platforms: Microsoft Windows, Mac OS
- Release: September 30, 1998; June 18, 1999 (Mac)
- Genre: City-building
- Mode: Single-player

Caesar III is a city-building game released on September 30, 1998, for Microsoft Windows and Mac OS, developed by Impressions Games and published by Sierra On-Line. It is the third installment of the Caesar series of games and is part of Sierra's City Building series. Players assume the role of a provincial governor to build thriving cities across the Roman Empire, in which they must ensure their citizens have their needs met, and deal with various disasters, angry gods and hostile enemies. The developers of Caesar III designed the game in response to critiques of its predecessor, introducing branching missions, a merged map for city-building and combat, and a "walker" mechanic for citizens of the city to affect their surroundings. Caesar III was released to positive critical reception, with praise directed at the game's visual presentation and complex design, and criticism levelled at its military features.

== Gameplay ==
Caesar III features two modes of play: 'Career', in which players follow a progression of assignments of increasing difficulty with conditions for success, and the 'City Construction Kit', an open-ended mode without victory conditions. The Career mode of Caesar III follows a series of branching assignments requiring players to construct cities of increasing size and complexity. Assignments are set over time in historical Roman cities, such as Brundisium and Londinium. Players are given a choice at the beginning of each assignment to play a map that is 'peaceful' or 'military'. Military assignments include the risk of enemy invasion, whilst peaceful assignments contain more stringent requirements for victory, and additional challenges including earthquakes, fires and other hazards.

Gameplay in Caesar III involves the construction of cities on a map displayed in a two dimensional isometric perspective. Buildings are selected from an interface under submenus categorized by building type. Players are required to manage several interconnected supply chains in order to sustain the growth of their city, which increases as more needs are met, including the supply of water, food, religious services, entertainment, education, and health. Caesar III features significant changes to its predecessor, Caesar II. In Caesar III, all actions occur on a single map, in contrast to the province and city maps of its predecessor. Caesar III also features inhabitants that provide services to buildings by walking past them, adding an additional element of strategy to road pathing. In addition, different areas of terrain generate different resources and obstacles, including river channels, fertile land, and mining areas.

A screenshot from Caesar III depicting its isometric perspective gameplay.

Progress in Caesar III is evaluated against the population of a city and four ratings: Culture, Prosperity, Peace and Favor. Culture ratings are measured by the coverage of 'culture buildings' (such as temples, theaters, and schools) in a city. Prosperity takes into account factors such as employment rates, housing quality, and revenue. Peace ratings rise so long as no damage is caused by crime, riots, or invasion. Favor ratings are measured by whether players fulfil in a timely manner the requests from Caesar to pay a tribute or provide gifts. Players are provided with a series of advisors who can help them with various aspects of city life. These include a chief advisor, who summarizes key information and critical issues, as well as advisors that provide statistics and options for the provision and coverage of most services in the game, including labor, health, education, trade and religion. The game menu also provides access to a map of the Empire to facilitate trade and identify threats from enemy invasions.

Following release, Sierra made available for download a map editor for the game on their website. The editor allows players to produce their own scenarios from over twenty city locations, as well as choosing the identity of invaders, available buildings, and features on the map itself. The editor was also distributed with later releases of the game.

== Development and release ==
The game that would become Caesar III was initially conceived by Impressions Games as a city-building game set in space. Developer David Lester cited initial hesitation to pursue a third Caesar game as "Caesar II had been so well-received that we didn't know where to take it...there were points we had considered and discarded for Caesar II that we could add, but they wouldn't amount to a new product." After six months of development, the designers returned to Ancient Rome as a setting for the project. Simon Bradbury of Impressions Games reflected that a key decision to continue with sequels to Caesar was that Ancient Rome contained a "wealth of material for a strategy game...there's a lot of epic history which I think a lot of people can easily identify with".

Many features introduced in Caesar III ultimately were developed in response to critiques of its predecessor Caesar II, including the introduction of mission choice to reduce repetition in the game and integration of combat into the city view. The decision to use 'walkers' to distribute resources across cities was another innovation. Simon Bradbury of Impressions Games stated the mechanic was introduced as "we wanted to do something different...we liked the SimCity sense (that) you place the building down and it affects things around it but we always found that was a bit static. The walker mechanic was an efficient way of coding the game (and) add a sense of randomness into the city."

The soundtrack for Caesar III was composed by Robert Euvino. The game was the first major project undertaken by Euvino, who would continue to compose for games in the Stronghold series. Euvino approached the Caesar III soundtrack by attempting to find a balance between the "cliché sound of the Coliseum made famous by Hollywood" and attempting to "preserve some of my own personal style".

The game, alongside its successors Pharaoh and Zeus: Master of Olympus, were re-released in a digital format on Good Old Games as one of the earliest titles available on the platform in 2010. The re-release removed the DRM requirement, fixed stability bugs with modern operating systems and has enabled players to continue to experience the game. The GOG.com version was subsequently released onto Steam in 2016, but the client-based DRM of Steam has caused that version to suffer from stability and compatibility problems not seen on the original digital version provided by GOG.com.

== Reception ==
=== Sales ===
Caesar III was a commercial success. It shipped 150,000 copies in its first month of release, at which time it was on track to top the sales of Caesar II. In the United States, the game took 10th place on PC Data's weekly computer game sales rankings for October 18–24, 1998. It was absent from the top 10 the following week, but ultimately claimed ninth place for the month of October as a whole. According to PC Data, sales of Caesar III surpassed 93,000 units in the United States alone by February 1999. In the German market, Caesar III had spent 10 weeks on Media Control's computer game sales charts by early 1999, with placements of sixth and ninth for the first and second halves of January, respectively. Late that year, the Verband der Unterhaltungssoftware Deutschland (VUD) gave Caesar III a "Gold" award for its commercial performance through September 1999, indicating sales of at least 100,000 units across Germany, Austria and Switzerland.

Caesar III's global sales had surpassed 400,000 copies by January 1999. That April, Sierra's Jim Veevaert announced that the overall Caesar series, including Caesar III, had sold "well over one million units" globally. According to designer David Lester, around 2.5 million copies of Caesar III were ultimately sold worldwide.

=== Critical reviews ===
Reception

Review scores
Publication	Score
Computer Gaming World	4.5/5
Computer and Video Games	4/5
GameSpot	7.9
Hyper	87%
IGN	8.7
PC Gamer (UK)	87%
PC PowerPlay	88%
PC Zone	92/100
Computer Games Strategy Plus	4/5
Macworld	4/5

Reviews for Caesar III were highly positive, with many critics praising the game as a quality and well-rounded city-building game. Tim Carter of Computer Gaming World praised Caesar III as a "magnificent accomplishment", reflecting that "(the game) has an elusive, difficult-to-define quality of excellent gameplay". Similarly, Trent Ward of IGN remarked Caesar III was a "fantastic strategy game (that) is well thought, expertly designed, and artistically pleasing."

Most reviews directed significant praise at the challenging strategy behind the game's complex supply chains. David Wildgoose of PC PowerPlay praised the game's "variety and immense subtlety of (its) economic and political models", creating "deep and highly addictive strategy". Eliot Fish of Hyper stated "Caesar III is far more complex and challenging than a straightforward city management sim". The increasing scale of challenge and complexity with city size was a common feature of reviews, with Steve Hill of PC Zone stating "it all starts harmlessly enough...before you know it, thousands of people are dependent on you and you have a fully functioning city (that) takes a life of its own."

The visual presentation of Caesar III was also a highlight for reviewers of the game. Richard Lechowich of Computer Games Strategy Plus found the graphics to be "greatly improved over the other games in the series", and Trent Ward of IGN stated "all of the buildings are portrayed with amazing artistic talent". The interface design was also praised as intuitive, with Eliot Fish of Hyper observing "not only are the menus clear and informative, well structured and easy to access, but the graphics are brilliantly drawn and it's a cinch to visually keep track of what's going down."

Critics were divided on the military features of Caesar III. Some critics found the features overly simplistic, with Richard Lechowich of Computer Games Magazine noting that players may "not appreciate" the game's greater emphasis on economics in place of military activity. "Ron Dulin of GameSpot stated that "Combat is the weakest point of Caesar III...(it) is mostly a matter of selecting the group and clicking a point on the map...combat simply becomes a matter of clicking on the enemy." Other critics believed the combat was satisfactory, with Trent Ward of IGN stating "for the most part combat is pretty intuitive".

=== Accolades ===
Caesar III won Macworld's 1999 "Best World-Building Simulation" prize. Computer Games Strategy Plus and the Academy of Interactive Arts & Sciences nominated Caesar III in their "PC Strategy Game of the Year" category. The game was a runner-up for PC Gamer US's award for the best real-time strategy title of 1998.
