= City Building (series) =

- Genre: City-building
- Developers: Impressions Games; BreakAway Games; Tilted Mill Entertainment; Sierra Entertainment
- Publisher: Sierra Entertainment
- Platforms: Amiga, Atari ST, MS-DOS, Windows, Mac OS
- First release: Caesar; 1992
- Latest release: Pharaoh: A New Era; 2023

City Building is a series of historical city-building games developed by Impressions Games, BreakAway Games, Tilted Mill Entertainment (following Impressions' demise), and published by Sierra Entertainment. The series began in 1992 with Caesar, set in the Roman Empire, and consists of twelve games to date, including expansion packs.

In the City Building series the player is put in charge of providing goods and services to the populace of their town, ensuring crime is low, and reducing the risk of disease, fire and building collapse. The player must also strike a balance between imports, exports and taxes to keep their town financially strong. The player is also responsible for defending their town against invasion by building a military.

The series covers four ancient civilizations: Roman, Egyptian, Greek and Chinese. Titles released up until 2004 used the same isometric view game engine, although progressively tweaked and modified according to the theme of the game. Subsequent titles use three-dimensional graphics engines.

== Games ==
The series includes:

- Set in the Roman Empire:
  - Caesar (1992)
  - Caesar II (1995)
  - Caesar III (1998)
  - Caesar IV (2006)
- Set in ancient Egypt:
  - Pharaoh (1999)
    - Expansion Cleopatra: Queen of the Nile (2000)
    - Remake Pharaoh: A New Era (2023)
  - Immortal Cities: Children of the Nile (2004)
    - Expansion Children of the Nile: Alexandria (2008)
- Set in ancient Greece:
  - Zeus: Master of Olympus (2000)
    - Expansion Poseidon: Master of Atlantis (2001)
- Set in ancient China:
  - Emperor: Rise of the Middle Kingdom (2002)
- Set in the Middle Ages:
  - Medieval Mayor (TBA)

== Medieval Mayor ==
Medieval Mayor was an announced city-building game set in the Middle Ages by Tilted Mill Entertainment for the PC and tablets. Unlike the previous two games by Tilted Mill Entertainment, Immortal Cities: Children of the Nile and Caesar IV, the game would not use a 3D engine but return to the 2D engine, because Tilted Mill thought "2D works better in terms of players being able to tell what’s going on at a glance". Walkers would once again be limited by roadblocks instead of the more recent radius-based or pseudo walker systems, and players would focus more on building a few cities to great heights, rather than restart a new city after each mission. There would be no multiplayer, but Tilted Mill was planning integration with social media.

As of October 2013 Medieval Mayor was put on hiatus due to funding challenges and other project commitments. In later interviews, Chris Beatrice expressed both his continued desire to eventually make the game and reticence to start development.
