= Emperor: Rise of the Middle Kingdom =

2002 video game

- Developers: BreakAway Games; Impressions Games
- Publisher: Sierra Entertainment
- Producers: Ed Beach; Jon Payne
- Designers: Charles Kibler; Ed Beach; Tony Leier
- Programmer: Andy House
- Artists: Stephen Langmead; Mike Phillips; Andrea Muzeroll
- Composer: Jeff van Dyck
- Series: City Building
- Platform: Microsoft Windows
- Release: NA: September 10, 2002; UK: October 11, 2002
- Genre: City-building
- Modes: Single-player, multiplayer

Emperor: Rise of the Middle Kingdom is a city-building video game and the sixth title in the City Building series, released in 2002 for Microsoft Windows. BreakAway Games was contracted for Emperor after having previously worked on Queen of the Nile. Emperor is the last of the series to use the same 2D-sprite game engine as seen in the earlier titles, and the first to introduce a multiplayer option.

Like the earlier games, Emperor focuses on the building and development of a city in ancient times, this time Ancient China, from the Xia dynasty (2033 BC) to the Song-Jin dynasties (1234 AD).

== Gameplay ==
The most basic task in each mission is to maintain the city. This involves keeping the populace well-fed, healthy, and safe from hazards. If food and basic goods and services are provided in abundance, the city will eventually improve. Beyond this, the player must manage trade and taxes in order to fund further development and expansion.

In the meantime, the player may elect to make offerings to the ancestral heroes, as well as prominent figures in Chinese philosophy, Daoism, and Buddhism. Principally, offerings are made to appease the heroes and prevent them from becoming angry and inflicting disasters upon the city. But heroes can also be made very happy, which can prompt them to visit the city and confer benefits to it.

Beyond the city itself, the player must pay heed to rivals and enemies. Unlike previous city-building games in the series, the player must respond to requests and standing of various other cities, rather than just maintaining favor of the monarch. Troops and guards are necessary to protect the city from military invasions and subterfuge. The player can build defensive walls and man them with archers for improved defense.

Eventually, the player may be required to build monuments, which are costly both in time and materials, giving enemies an opportunity to take advantage of possible weaknesses. As such, building a monument generally requires that the city first establish a strong economy and military.

The seven campaigns of Emperor span nearly 3300 years of classical Chinese history, from the Xia dynasty to the Jin dynasty and Song dynasty, all put in order. Notable monuments that can be built include the Great Wall of China, the Grand Canal connecting the Yellow and Yangzi Rivers, and the Terracotta Army. In the first campaign, the player is simply a humble village elder, in charge of leading a nomadic tribe to settle down along the river. This transforms in the final levels, the player is servant to the Emperor of China, and oversees the construction of the Imperial capital Zhongdu (modern-day Beijing) and fortifying its defense to foil the invading Mongols and their leader, Genghis Khan.

Foodstuffs, technologies, and religions evolve over the centuries, closely matching the actual history of Chinese culture. Because players serve several dynasties and Emperors throughout the game, they will not always be building the same city. Often, they will be sent to build up a new city, or be sent back to a previous city to accomplish a new goal. In some cases, a city may be revisited after centuries have passed, having changed dramatically or fallen into ruins during the intervening years.

Players may play the campaigns in any order they choose, though the difficulty level ramps up parallel to the chronology. Often the objectives involve producing a set amount of a commodity, conquering other cities, achieving a certain population level, or building a monument.

== Reception ==
Reception

Aggregate score
Aggregator	Score
Metacritic	77/100

Review scores
Publication	Score
Computer Games Magazine	3.5/5
Computer Gaming World	3.5/5
EP Daily	7.5/10
Game Informer	9.25/10
GameSpot	7.7/10
GameSpy	4/5
GameZone	9.3/10
IGN	8.8/10
Jeuxvideo.com	15/20
PC Gamer (US)	72%

The game received "generally favorable reviews" according to the review aggregation website Metacritic. Despite the positive reviews many were critical of the lack of originality and reported little difference between the game and previous Impressions games.

In February 2017 the game was re-released on GOG.com.
