= High Seas Trader =

1995 video game

- Developer: Impressions Games
- Publisher: Impressions Games
- Designers: Christopher J. Foster; David Lester
- Programmer: Chris Gurski
- Artist: Chris Beatrice
- Composers: Jeremy A. Bell; Jason P. Rinaldi
- Platforms: MS-DOS, Amiga
- Release: 1995
- Genre: Business simulation
- Mode: Single-player

High Seas Trader is a naval business simulation game published by Impressions Games in 1995 for MS-DOS and Amiga. The player runs trade routes, fends off pirates, collects artifacts and offers transport to fellow countrymen in need, all for the sake of climbing up the game's ranking ladder, which in turn allows the player to buy bigger ships, more firepower and larger cargo holds to progress more quickly in the ranks.

== Gameplay ==
The game is set in the year 1650. The player starts out with the most basic ship (Fluyt) and 5,000 (5k) gold.

=== Nations ===
The player chooses a nation at the beginning of the game. Consequences lie in the relations between nations; which nations declare war/peace will determine which ports the player can access at given times, and which ships will open fire on them at sea. The options are:

- Dutch
- English
- French
- Portuguese
- Spanish

=== Ships ===
- Fluyt
  - Crew: 100
  - Cargohold: 300 tons
  - Firepower: 4 banks of 1 cannon each
  - Price: 4k gold
- Corvette
  - Crew: 100
  - Cargohold: 150 tons
  - Firepower: 4 banks of 2 cannon each
  - Price: 8k gold
- Merchant
  - Crew: 200
  - Cargohold: 500 tons
  - Firepower: 4 banks of 2 cannon each
  - Price: 14k gold
- Frigate
  - Crew: 200
  - Cargohold: 350 tons
  - Firepower: 4 banks of 4 cannon each
  - Price: 16k gold
- East Indiaman
  - Crew: 250
  - Cargohold: 700 tons
  - Firepower: 4 banks of 5 cannon each
  - Price: 21k gold
- Fourth rate
  - Crew: 300
  - Cargohold: 600 tons
  - Firepower: 4 banks of 8 cannon each
  - Price: 27k gold

=== Titles ===
- Peddler (Fluyt and Corvette)
- Journeyman (Merchant and Frigate)
- Tradesman (East Indianman and Fourth rate, Small estate – 2 treasures max)
- Merchant (Medium estate – 4 treasures max)
- Master Merchant (Large estate – 6 treasures max)
- Viscount (end of the game)

=== Guild ladder ===
Climbing up the ladder ranks grants the player titles, access to bigger ships, and bigger estates. The player can gather points in the categories, then cash them in for a title. Once they are granted a title, the points in the categories reset, allowing them to do it all over.

=== Ammo ===
- Round (Long-range ammunition)
- Chain (Short-range ammunition, tears up sails leaving enemy ships dead in the water)
- Grape (Short-range ammunition, leaves big holes in attacking ships, akin to firing a huge shotgun filled with grape-sized balls of steel. Note: The actual purpose of grapeshot was to reduce the enemy crew.)

=== Cannons ===
- Swivel-gun (0.3t)
- Saker (1.0t)
- Demi-culverin (1.2t)
- Culverin (2.0t)
- Demi-cannon (2.5t)
- Cannon (3.0t)

=== Banks ===
Players can place money in banks for safekeeping. This is useful if they ever lose a battle at sea, as they can start over with their savings. However, the savings are reduced by the interest rate over time, as the player must pay for the security.

== Reception ==
High Seas Trader received mixed or average reviews. The game was reviewed in 1995 in Dragon #221 by John Brunkhart in the "Eye of the Monitor" column. Brunkhart gave the game 2 out of 5 stars.

Next Generation reviewed the PC version of the game, rating it three stars out of five, and stated that "Although the subject material may be a little too dry for some gamers, High Seas Trader is definitely a must for strategy fans."

== See also ==
- Taipan! (1979)
- Sid Meier's Pirates! (1987)
