= Builders of Egypt =

2022 video game

- Developer: Strategy Labs
- Publishers: PlayWay S.A., CreativeForge Games
- Designer: Jacek Turek
- Composer: Paweł Płoskoń
- Engine: Unreal Engine 4
- Platform: Microsoft Windows
- Release: 8 January 2025
- Genre: City-building
- Mode: Single-player

Builders of Egypt is an economic type of city-building game taking place in Ancient Egypt. The story starts in a little-known protodynastic period. The player will be able to observe the birth of Egyptian Civilization and the game will finish with the fall of the Ptolemaic Kingdom and Cleopatra's death.

Builders of Egypt: Prologue, a demo version, was released on 2 March 2020.

== Gameplay ==
Builders of Egypt has similarities with previous city-building games by Impressions Games' set in Ancient Egypt: Pharaoh and its spiritual successor, Immortal Cities: Children of the Nile.
