= Keith Zizza =

Video game soundtrack composer

Keith Zizza is a video game soundtrack composer. He has worked as a composer and audio director for companies such as Electronic Arts, Impressions Games, Sierra Entertainment and Tilted Mill Entertainment. His discography includes more than 25 AAA game titles. In April 2008 Zizza released his debut solo album, Memories of a Forgotten Age.

== Discography ==
=== Video games ===
- Lords of the Realm II (1996)
- Grant, Lee, Sherman: Civil War Generals 2 (1997)
- Lords of Magic (1997)
- Pharaoh (1999)
- Zeus: Master of Olympus (2000)
- Immortal Cities: Children of the Nile (2004)
- Caesar IV (2006)
- SimCity Societies (2007)

=== Solo works ===
- Memories of a Forgotten Age (2008)
