= Lords of the Realm III =

2004 video game

- Cover art of Lords of the Realm III
- Developer: Impressions Games
- Publisher: Sierra Entertainment
- Producer: David Nathanielsz
- Designer: Brett Levin
- Programmer: Justin Przedwojewski
- Composer: Henry Beckett
- Series: Lords of the Realm
- Platform: Windows
- Release: NA: March 16, 2004; EU: March 26, 2004
- Genre: Real-time strategy
- Modes: Single-player, multiplayer

Lords of the Realm III (also known as Lords 3) is a medieval themed real-time strategy computer game published in March 2004 by Sierra Entertainment, a subsidiary of Vivendi Universal Games. It is the third installment in the Lords of the Realm series, and the last game made by Impressions Games.

== Gameplay ==
At the start of a game, the player must choose a noble by either selecting one of the default nobles or creating a new one. Nobles act as user accounts within the game, wherein completed campaigns and saved games are local to each noble. A noble consists of three customizable features: housename, portrait, and heraldry.

Once a noble is selected, the player can choose to play a campaign or battle map, or load a saved game. While all the battle maps are available when a noble is created, the campaigns require that the player complete each level in sequence. The game has four campaigns, each with several scenarios.

=== Battle maps ===
In a battle map, the player is placed in a battlefield and is provided with predefined companies of soldiers available to them. The only victory condition of these battles is to defeat all enemy companies. The gameplay is consistent with that of the battle mode in the campaigns.

=== Layers ===
Except for the tutorials, campaigns consist of three layers of gameplay: the strategy layer, the diplomacy layer, and the battle layer. The layers allow the player to control different components of the game.

==== Strategy layer and vassalage ====
The strategy layer allows the player to see a large overview of the lands to command their armies and assign vassals to the lands they possess. The land that the player possesses is subdivided into parcels. The player must assign a vassal to each parcel to manage the land for them.

There are several different types of parcels that dictate what they will produce. Furthermore, each parcel is of a certain quality which determines how fast they will upgrade their land and produce units. The different categories of vassals are as follows:

- Knight - Builds a fort on a parcel, which will produce a company of a certain type that is based on the knight.
- Priest - A priest will build a church on a parcel which increase the player's Christianity level.
- Burgher - A burgher builds a city on their designated parcel that produces gold to be spent on upgrades to the player's castle or hiring mercenaries.
- Serf - Serfs build farmlands on parcels that supply the armies with food.

==== Diplomacy layer ====
In the diplomacy screen, the player may assess his progress and the progress of the other nobles as well as engage in politics such as trade, war declarations, and forming alliances. The diplomacy screen shows a diplomatic map of all the lands, colored by the nobles who own them, that displays parcel usage, army locations, and territorial control. The player can view their chivalry, Christianity, and honor levels, and their progress in obtaining the next level in each of them.

==== Battle layer ====
The battle layer engages the player in the battlefield, allowing them to manually control their companies.

== Reception ==
Reception

Aggregate score
Aggregator	Score
Metacritic	65/100

Review scores
Publication	Score
Computer Gaming World	1/5
GameSpot	8.4/10
GameSpy	3/5
IGN	6.4/10
PC Format	41%
PC Gamer (UK)	77%
PC Gamer (US)	66%
PC Zone	19%
X-Play	3/5

Lords of the Realm III received "mixed" reviews according to the review aggregation website Metacritic. A common complaint was, relative to its predecessors, the simplification of province management and the departure from the turn-based strategy map.

Lords of the Realm III was a runner-up for Computer Games Magazine's 2004 "Best Budget Game" award, but lost to The Political Machine.
