= Anno 1701: Dawn of Discovery =

2007 video game

- Developer: Keen Games
- Publishers: PAL: Disney Interactive Studios (Note: Released under the Touchstone Games banner.); NA: Ubisoft
- Series: Anno
- Platform: Nintendo DS
- Release: GER: 8 June 2007; UK: 24 August 2007; NA: 4 March 2008
- Genre: Real-time strategy
- Modes: Single-player, multiplayer

Anno 1701: Dawn of Discovery, also known as simply Anno 1701 in Germany, is a 2007 real-time strategy video game of the Anno franchise for the Nintendo DS. It is published by Disney Interactive and makes extensive use of the system's touch-screen capabilities. There are three game mode options, consisting of a story mode, continuous play, and multiplayer. It has been released in Europe, Australia, Canada and the United States.

== Gameplay ==
The player begins with a ship stocked with the necessary items to start a settlement. The player explores the sea to find an island that is suitable for settling and building a new colony. If the settlers are satisfied with everything they need, they will go up to the next stage. As they move through each stage, they will demand more things. In continuous play mode the player can choose up to three rivals, which will advance about the same rate as the player. As the settlers advance through each stage of settlement, the player can build warships and send to possessed island and build beachheads and then attack military buildings. If the player captures all of them, the island is theirs. The story mode is similar, but the player needs to fulfill specific tasks to proceed.

== Reception ==
Reception

Aggregate score
Aggregator	Score
Metacritic	78/100

Review scores
Publication	Score
Eurogamer	8.0/10
IGN	7.5/10
PALGN	8.0/10
VideoGamer.com	8.0/10

Metacritic recorded a score of 78/100 based on 14 reviews. IGN gave it 7.8/10, calling it "versatile" and "lots of fun."

== Sources ==
- http://www.ubi.com/US/Games/Info.aspx?pId=6381
- https://web.archive.org/web/20070928044504/http://www.tothegame.com/game.asp?id=6453
- http://ds.ign.com/objects/893/893951.html
