= Cultures 2: The Gates of Asgard =

2002 video game

- Cover art by Michel Bohbot
- Developer: Funatics Software
- Publisher: JoWooD Productions
- Composer: Fabian Del Priore
- Release: Microsoft Windows: RUS: 12 July 2002; POL: 14 August 2002; DEU: 25 August 2002
- Genres: Real-time strategy City-building game

Cultures 2: The Gates of Asgard (German: Cultures 2: Die Tore Asgards) is a real-time strategy and city-building video game for Microsoft Windows, released on 26 August 2002, by Funatics Software, a video game developer based in Oberhausen, Germany. The game was published in Germany and Poland by JoWooD Productions and in Russia by Russobit-M. It is part of the Cultures series, and is the sequel to Cultures: Discovery of Vinland.

== Gameplay ==
In Cultures 2 the player builds and develops Vinland settlements by gathering resources and training citizens in various occupations.

== Development ==
The game was developed by Funatics Software, and was originally released in Europe in 2002.

== Reception ==
Reception

Review scores
Publication	Score
Game Informer	78/100
GameZone	7.7/10
GameSpot	7.5/10
Media and Games Online Network	60/100
Yahoo!	50/100

Cultures 2: The Gates of Asgard received mixed to positive reviews. Critics were divided based on their tolerance for slow pacing and micromanagement.

Critics praised the mechanical depth and focus on villagers. GameSpot highlighted the combination of city-building and role-playing elements, noting that focusing on people rather than structures gave the game personality. Reviewers from GameZone and Yahoo! agreed the deep administrative systems appeal to fans of micromanagement.

The game's pacing and learning curve drew criticism. Game Informer cited excessive waiting times to see settlement progression. Media and Games Online Network stated the intense resource management and slow pace would deter average players, while Yahoo! found the elaborate profession and skill trees tedious.
