= Banished (video game) =

2014 video game

- Developer: Shining Rock Software
- Publisher: Shining Rock Software
- Designer: Luke Hodorowicz
- Platform: Windows
- Release: WW: February 18, 2014
- Genres: City-building, survival

Banished is a city-building video game developed by Shining Rock Software. It was released for Windows on February 18, 2014. The game focuses on careful resource management and survival as an isolated and growing society. Its gameplay can be compared with economic theory on sustainability and optimization. Banished received mixed reviews on release, with reviewers praising graphics and difficulty early in the game, but criticizing a lack of feedback for player actions and lower emphasis on survival as the city grows.

== Gameplay ==
Gameplay screenshot without the user interface

Banished revolves around the player guiding citizens of a remote community of outcasts to grow and maintain a settlement through a command economy. The game focuses on the player's town as a whole, with the citizens of the town acting as a resource to be managed. The player must assign citizens to various jobs such as building or fishing. The citizens then perform the job without specific direction from the player. Citizens have needs that must be met in order to keep them happy and healthy, such as ensuring enough food is available or that they have a home. Additional citizens come from two sources, the birth of children and the arrival of nomads, wandering groups that wish to join the player's town. The player's citizens will age and eventually die.

The player must order the building of various structures in order to support the citizens, such as houses, blacksmith shops, hospitals, farms, and schools, while ensuring enough resources are being produced to keep the citizens stocked. The player must balance the use of resources against the town's growth.

The citizens of the society act as the player's primary resource. Keeping them healthy, happy and well-fed is pivotal to making the town prosper. Hazards in the game come in the form of harsh weather conditions, fires, depression, starvation, and an aging population.

== Development and release ==
Banished's development began in August 2011 by Luke Hodorowicz as Shining Rock Software, a sole proprietorship. In a September 2013 interview, Hodorowicz said the video game series Anno was a big inspiration, which influenced his decision not to include combat in the initial release.

PC Gamer interviewed Hodorowicz in December 2013, where he noted that he hoped to release the game by January 2014. Hodorowicz stated he had put over 5500 hours into the development of the game, and hoped to eventually add support for Linux and OS X. On January 9, 2014, it was announced the game would be released for Windows on February 18, 2014. Support for mods was announced in July 2014, and was introduced in November 2014.

== Reception ==
Reception

Aggregate score
Aggregator	Score
Metacritic	73/100

Review scores
Publication	Score
Eurogamer	6/10
Game Informer	8/10
GameSpot	8/10
IGN	8.3/10
PC Gamer (US)	70/100
Polygon	7.5/10
The Escapist	3.5/5

Banished received "mixed or average" reviews upon release, according to review aggregator Metacritic, which assigns a weighted average score out of 100 to reviews from critics and gave the game a score of 73 based on 32 reviews.

Charlie Hall from Polygon scored the game 7.5 out of 10.0, noting that Banished felt more like a "survival simulation" than a city-building simulation. Hall also praised the game's graphics and animations but noted that the game struggled with giving players solid feedback on the results of their actions. Paul Dean from Eurogamer gave the game a score of 6/10, noting that the game was a "survival sandbox. It's harsh", agreeing with Hall that it was difficult to get information. Dean noted that having to build structures in a strict grid-like pattern felt generic and formulaic.

PC Gamer's Andy Chalk gave the game a score of 70 out of 100, stating that it is "a nice change of pace for city-builders", but noted that as the population grows, survival becomes less of a focus and city management takes over. Daniel Starkey of GameSpot scored the game 8/10, noting how the different mechanics of each structure interlock and provide relevance, and praising the difficulty. However, Starkey noted the game suffered from lacking a sense of progression.

Daniel Tack for Game Informer rated the game with an 8/10, comparing it to games such as Dwarf Fortress and Towns, but more accessible and with improved graphics. IGN's Rowan Kaiser awarded an 8.3/10 score, noting that Banished suffered when the gameplay difficulty was lower, while also making the same comparison to Dwarf Fortress as Game Informer. Kaiser praised Banished for creating difficulty through the lack of a money resource, rather than using money as the primary source of the difficulty.

The Escapist's Greg Tito gave the game 3.5/5 stars, praising the simulation aspects and interface, but noting that it doesn't take long to see everything it has to offer. Tito felt the game's difficulty suffered as the town grew larger, with no proper end game goal to keep players engaged beyond earning achievements.

In 2020, Rock, Paper, Shotgun mentioned the game in its top ten management games for the PC.

== Sequel ==
On September 19, 2018, designer Luke Hodorowicz announced he is developing a successor to the game.

The last blog post on his website was made on April 17th, 2022, suggesting development of its sequel was ceased. Luke Hodorowicz mentions the project suffers from "code rot", causing issues in developing the game. Since then, the developer of Banished has been silent and his current condition remains unknown.
