= Moonbase (video game) =

1990 video game

- Developer: Wesson International
- Publishers: Mindscape; Mallard Software
- Platforms: MS-DOS, Amiga
- Release: 1990 (MS-DOS); 1991 (Amiga)
- Genre: City-building

Moonbase is a 1990 city-building game set on the Moon. Developed by Wesson International, it was published for Amiga and MS-DOS. An updated version, called Lunar Command, was published in 1993 by Mallard Software.

== Gameplay ==
Players assume the role of a manager and must build then expand their moonbase, balancing the production of essentials such as air and power in order to keep the base running within a budget.

== Reception ==
Reception

Review score
Publication	Score
Computer Gaming World	4/5; 3/5

Computer Gaming World covered the game in several issues. In 1991 it stated that Moonbase was "a realistic simulation that offers a challenge", with "visual spice and a pinch of whimsy". In a 1992 survey of science fiction games, the magazine gave the title four out of five stars, describing it as "Probably the most detailed realistic space 'construction' set ever produced. Not for the 'joystick' crowd, but recommended for the user willing to engage his brain". In 1993, the magazine recommended the game as educational and "worthwhile" for children in middle school and older. A 1994 survey of strategic space games set in the year 2000 and later gave Lunar Command three stars out of five, stating that "its economic modeling is excellent. Overall excitement is on a somewhat lower plane".

== See also ==
- Planetbase, 2015
