= Pharaoh (video game) =

1999 video game

- Developers: Impressions Games (Pharaoh); BreakAway Games (Cleopatra)
- Publisher: Sierra Studios
- Producers: Ken Parker; Greg Sheppard
- Designer: Chris Beatrice
- Programmer: Mike Gingerich
- Artists: Darrin Horbal; Heidi Mann; Mike Malone
- Writer: Lisa Gagnon
- Composers: Henry Beckett; Keith Zizza
- Series: City Building
- Platform: Microsoft Windows
- Release: NA: 2 November 1999; UK: 19 November 1999; Cleopatra: Queen of the Nile: NA: 14 July 2000; EU: 15 September 2000
- Genre: City-building
- Mode: Single-player

Pharaoh is an isometric city-building game released in November 1999. It was created by Impressions Games and published by Sierra Studios for Microsoft Windows. Using the same game engine and principles of Caesar III (also by Sierra Entertainment), it is the first such game in Sierra's City Building series to focus on another civilization of ancient times. Players oversee the construction and management of cities and settlements in Ancient Egypt, micro-managing every aspect of the city to ensure citizens are fed, employed, healthy and protected from diseases, disasters and wars. An expansion pack, Cleopatra: Queen of the Nile (known as simply Cleopatra), was released in 2000, developed by BreakAway Games. In 2001, both the game and expansion pack were bundled together as Pharaoh Gold. A remake titled Pharaoh: A New Era was released by Triskell Interactive and Dotemu in 2023.

== Gameplay ==
Pharaoh is played from a two-dimensional isometric perspective; the magnification level is fixed, but the viewing angle can be changed at 90-degree angles, either counterclockwise or clockwise. Much of the control is managed through the mouse and keyboard shortcuts, in an interface system similar to that of Caesar III. Many buttons exist for different types of construction like housing and roads, viewing messages, undoing mistakes, cycling through trouble spots, a map of Ancient Egypt and the surrounding regions, a group of advisors (called Overseers) who provide information on the city's development and any problems encountered, and in-game overlays that detail issues and the fulfillment of housing's demands. All aspects of city life, such as housing, religion, warfare and trade, are designed carefully to closely reflect that of actual Ancient Egyptian cities of the time, including the goods and services available. Names of various pharaohs are used with the appearance of historical characters from Egypt's ancient history, and limited encyclopedic information about ancient Egyptian practices is provided in the game's help menu and instruction booklet. While the game uses the deben as its currency, no standardized metal currency is known to have been used in Ancient Egypt. Although the puzzle-like aspect of Pharaoh keeps the simulation far from realistic, the game stays true to the chronological order and timing of major events in the history of Egypt, including monument construction, wars and national disasters, the births and deaths of notable leaders, and the founding and fall of ancient cities.

=== Game modes ===
The game features two modes of play – campaign and free-build. In campaign mode, players focus on establishing cities during different periods of Ancient Egypt, initially working on nomad settlements, before being entrusted with building up trade centres, grand cities and monuments for various Ancient Egyptian leaders. As campaign mode progresses, players earn promotions until they become the Pharaoh themselves. Players operate in five periods of Ancient Egyptian history (six with the inclusion of Cleopatra), with the first period acting as a basic tutorial. In later periods, players get a choice between two missions, usually peaceful and military alternatives, but only one of the two needs to be completed to move on in the campaign.

In free-build mode, players are given a choice of around a dozen standalone scenarios. Some do not have win conditions, allowing open-ended "sandbox" city-building, whereas others present goals to attain. A map editor is provided with the game to facilitate the creation of user-designed scenarios for this mode.

The Pharaoh interface

=== Gameplay elements ===
Pharaoh simulates many aspects of Egyptian life and city management. While many of the elements of the game, from housing to industry, are borrowed from Caesar III, the game distinguishes itself with differences and new features. For example, after housing plots are designated, immigrants can move into them and build their residences. Housing will automatically be improved, including in appearance, when demands for goods, services and desirable surroundings are fulfilled. While Population, Prosperity and Culture are retained in the game, Favor is renamed as "Kingdom" and maintains the same function in that the score is based upon the ruling Pharaoh's view on a player's performance (this later becomes the wider countries' view once the player becomes Pharaoh themselves). Peace is replaced with a new goal, "Monument", which focuses on a player's efforts to establish the monuments needed within their city; players will usually be given the knowledge of the monuments they need to build during a briefing of their next mission.

In terms of farming, floodplain farms are a new feature built near the Nile River. A further addition is the use of Irrigation Ditches to increase the fertility of farmland. Fishers operate in boats, usually situated in the Nile. Hunting is a new feature in Pharaoh; animals to be hunted are present on the game map. A wide variety of raw materials and manufactured goods are available in Pharaoh. Materials include clay, which is manufactured into pottery; reeds, which are manufactured into papyrus; and various types of stone. Both raw materials and goods can be traded with other cities in exchange for currency. On some city maps, the raw materials necessary to produce certain goods are unavailable, so importing sometimes expensive materials is necessary. Exports are often necessary to produce money for city finances.

Much like the Senate building of Caesar III, the palace operates as the main treasury of the city. While architects operate out of their own building like Caesar III, fire and crime prevention are done by two separate buildings and walkers – firehouses and fire marshals, and police stations and constables. Players may also build Courthouses. Another new feature to the series, monuments from Ancient Egyptian history can be built on a variety of missions. Such projects require various worker facilities and building materials and, unlike most other buildings, take time to be built.

The game has five gods to appease, who each focus on a different aspect of the city – Ra (the kingdom), Bast (the home), Osiris (agriculture), Ptah (industry) and Seth (warfare). Each city is given one or several of the gods to worship: one is the patron god of the city, while the others are local deities. Players can construct shrines, temples or temple complexes to appease the gods. Like in Caesar III, the gods bestow gifts when they are appeased and disasters when they are angered, depending on their focus; for example, Osiris can improve the flooding of the Nile and increase crop yields, but can also decrease the quality of the Nile's annual flooding.

Fighting Egypt's enemies is a secondary element of the game. Pharaoh features three different unit types: infantry, archers and chariot riders. A player's city can be attacked by enemy forces, usually multiple times over the course of a mission. Troops can also be sent to help fellow Egyptian armies in battles outside the city. A new feature to Pharaoh is naval combat. Players have access to two types of ships – transports, which ferry ground troops across water, and warships, which fight enemy ships that arrive in the region.

The game also leaves out certain aspects from Caesar III, such as large bridges and inability to traverse large bodies of water other than by ferry.

== Reception ==
Pharaoh

Aggregate score
Aggregator	Score
GameRankings	82%

Review scores
Publication	Score
AllGame	4/5
CNET Gamecenter	7/10
Computer Games Strategy Plus	3.5/5
Computer Gaming World	4/5
EP Daily	8/10
Eurogamer	7/10
Game Informer	8.5/10
GameSpot	8.2/10
GameSpy	87%
IGN	9/10
Jeuxvideo.com	17/20
Next Generation	4/5
PC Accelerator	9/10
PC Gamer (US)	83%

=== Critical reception ===
The game received favourable reviews according to the review aggregation website GameRankings. Daniel Erickson of NextGen said of the game, "Pyramid building and floodplain management come together for a brilliant city builder." Barry Brenesal of GamePro said, "While Pharaoh offers nothing new under the sun (unless you consider the exotically colored soundtrack, which is pleasant for a day or so, and then ages like something left out too long under the hot Egyptian sun), it does what Caesar III did with equal panache, providing a good strategic challenge in a real-time game oriented more towards resource development than frenzy. Recommended." (Note: GamePro gave the game three 4/5 scores for graphics, control, and fun factor, and 3.5/5 for sound.)

The Academy of Interactive Arts & Sciences named Pharaoh as a finalist for "Outstanding Achievement in Art Direction" during the 3rd Annual Interactive Achievement Awards, which was ultimately given to Final Fantasy VIII.

=== Sales ===
In the German market, the game debuted at #4 on Media Control's computer game sales charts in the second half of November 1999. It had spent six weeks in the top rankings by the end of the year, with a fifth-place finish in December. The following year, the game continued at #5 in January and secured sixth for February. In April 2000, the Verband der Unterhaltungssoftware Deutschland (VUD) presented the game with a "Gold" award, indicating sales of at least 100,000 units across Germany, Austria and Switzerland. It remained in Media Control's top 10 by August 2000, and in the top 20 through November. By that time, the game had held in the firm's top 30 for 13 months.

The game became a worldwide hit. According to MeriStation, its combined global sales with Caesar III surpassed 1 million units by July 2000.

== Expansion pack ==
Cleopatra: Queen of the Nile cover art

The game was complemented with an expansion pack called Cleopatra: Queen of the Nile, developed by BreakAway Games the following year, which extended the game's main campaign into the Hellenistic period. Both the original game and expansion pack are commonly referred to, and may be purchased as one, under the title Pharaoh and Cleopatra.

=== Reception ===
Cleopatra: Queen of the Nile

Aggregate score
Aggregator	Score
Metacritic	77/100

Review scores
Publication	Score
CNET Gamecenter	7/10
Computer Games Strategy Plus	4/5
Computer Gaming World	3/5
EP Daily	8/10
GameSpot	7.5/10
GameSpy	80%
IGN	8.6/10
Jeuxvideo.com	16/20

Cleopatra received "generally favourable reviews" according to the review aggregation website Metacritic. Brenesal of GamePro said that the game was "just plain fun to watch, with its crowded streets thronged with servants, magistrates, and immigrants. There's a simulation aspect to Cleopatra that makes it resemble SimCity 3000, but with more individual personality." (Note: GamePro gave the expansion pack three 4/5 scores for graphics, control, and fun factor, and 3.5/5 for sound.)

== Legacy ==
=== Sequels ===
The next game in City Building series, Zeus: Master of Olympus, was released in 2000. The game features a number of changes, including being set in Ancient Greece as well as changes to certain gameplay mechanics; however, it is considered to be in most aspects very similar to Pharaoh. In 2004, another game in the series was set in Ancient Egypt: Immortal Cities: Children of the Nile.

=== Remake ===
A remake titled Pharaoh: A New Era was announced in August 2020 by Triskell Interactive and Dotemu. Early development planned new code for modern computer systems and an updated user interface, and to include the campaign modes from both Pharaoh and the Cleopatra: Queen of the Nile expansion. The remake was released on 15 February 2023.

=== Similar games ===
Nebuchadnezzar (2021) and Builders of Egypt (2025) have been compared to Pharaoh as being similar in gameplay and setting.
