= Cultures (video game) =

2000 video game

Cultures: Discovery of Vinland
- Developers: Funatics Software; Headup Games (iOS)
- Publishers: Phenomedia; Headup Games (iOS)
- Platforms: Windows, iOS
- Release: DE: September 1, 2000; UK: November 3, 2000; NA: July 31, 2001; iOS; July 24, 2014
- Genre: City-building game

Cultures: Discovery of Vinland (German: Cultures: Die Entdeckung Vinlands) is a 2000 real-time strategy and city-building game developed by Funatics Software and published by Phenomedia. It is the first entry in the Cultures series.

== Gameplay ==
Cultures is a real-time strategy and city-building game in which players manage the historical Vinland settlements of the Vikings. This includes constructing roads, handling the settlement's economy and training citizens in jobs such as blacksmithing. The ultimate goal is to gather shards of a crashed meteor that possesses magical properties.

== Development ==
The PC version was developed by Funatics Software, and was originally released in Europe during late 2000. Its North American release occurred on July 31, 2001. The iOS version was developed and published by Headup Games in 2014.

== Reception ==
=== Critical reviews ===
Reception

Aggregate score
Aggregator	Score
Metacritic	62/100

Review scores
Publication	Score
4Players	85%
AllGame	2/5
Computer Gaming World	2.5/5
Eurogamer	8/10
Game Informer	7.5/10
GameSpot	5.8/10
IGN	7.3/10
Jeuxvideo.com	15/20
Next Generation	3/5
PC Zone	72%

The PC version received "mixed" reviews according to the review aggregation website Metacritic. John Lee of NextGen said of the game, "The gameplay may be plentiful, but Viking reputations will suffer."

=== Sales ===
As a city-building title, the PC version is part of a genre that tended to see success in European countries but "never seems to catch on in the States", GameSpot's Bruce Geryk wrote in 2001. PC Games billed it as a competitor to games such as The Settlers IV and Anno 1503. Retailers pre-purchased 140,000 units of the game in preparation for its release, and sales expectations were high; Funatics' previous title, Catan: Die Erste Insel, had become a sleeper hit. In the German market, the game debuted at #3 on Media Control's computer game sales chart for September 2000. It placed sixth the following month, before falling to 16th in November. Global sales of the game rose to 150,000 units by March 2002.

== Sequels ==
Cultures was followed by three sequels: Cultures 2: The Gates of Asgard, Cultures: Northland and Cultures: 8th Wonder of the World.

The Cultures franchise became Funatics' most successful line, with combined sales above 700,000 units by 2018.
