= Maia (video game) =

2018 video game

- Game logo
- Developer: Simon Roth
- Writer: Paul Dean
- Composer: Nick Dymond
- Platforms: Microsoft Windows, OS X, Linux
- Release: WW: 23 November 2018
- Genres: Strategy, simulation, god game, dungeon management game

Maia is a sci-fi strategy simulation video game developed by Simon Roth. The game has been described as "Dungeon Keeper meets Dwarf Fortress on a primordial alien world". Roth also cites Theme Hospital, The Sims, Black & White and Space Station 13 amongst its influences.

== Gameplay ==
Players take control over the first human colony on the fictional planet of Maia in the Tau Ceti system.

Players will have to excavate an underground colony to escape the hostile surface of the world. They need to control a number of characters and robots to mine minerals for construction, build rooms to house, feed and entertain colonists, and construct intricate defences to protect them from dangerous wildlife.

The player's colony will face dangers including earthquakes, solar flares, meteor strikes, and hostile indigenous wildlife.

== Funding ==
The game was crowdfunded, raising £140,480 via Kickstarter, and another $11,435 via Indiegogo. Including funds raised via Steam's Early Access programme, Roth stated the project had "grossed over half a million dollars in backer funding" by December 2013.

== Release ==
An alpha version of the game was made available to people who have pre-ordered the game in August 2013. The game was added to Steam Early Access in December 2013. Full Release Date 23 November 2018.
