= Caesar IV =

2006 city-building video game

- Developer: Tilted Mill Entertainment
- Publisher: Sierra Entertainment
- Producers: Mat Williams; Joseph Selinske
- Designer: Chris Beatrice
- Programmer: Mike Gingerich
- Artists: Mike Malone; Adam Carriuolo
- Composer: Keith Zizza
- Series: City Building Series
- Platform: Microsoft Windows
- Release: NA: September 26, 2006; AU: September 28, 2006; EU: October 20, 2006
- Genre: City-building
- Modes: Single-player, multiplayer

Caesar IV is a city-building game set in ancient Rome, developed by Tilted Mill Entertainment and published by Sierra Entertainment (Vivendi Universal Games). The game was released on September 26, 2006, in North America. The game features a three-dimensional game engine and individual modeling of game character behaviors.

Like the original Caesar in 1992, the game simulates city administration in historical Rome.

== Gameplay ==
In a departure from older versions in the series, Caesar IV is equipped with variable, realistic 3D instead of fixed, isometric 3D. In addition, buildings and roads may be placed at 45 degree angles to the playing grid, as well as aligned with the grid, allowing game players more options in creating efficient and visually appealing city layouts.

In an attempt at historical realism, the game tries to stay as close to proper Roman lifestyles as possible. To this end, Sierra Games did detailed research into Roman lifestyles using secondary sources and primary sources.

The game is divided in three parts, named after the three traditional eras of Ancient Rome: "Kingdom", "Republic" and "Empire". The Kingdom part is a tutorial, while the Republic and Empire parts make up the campaign, where one can choose between peaceful and military assignments.

== Reception ==
Reception

Review scores
Publication	Score
PC Zone	73/100
Computer Games Magazine	4/5

Caesar IV received mixed reviews, with review aggregator website Metacritic giving it a rating of 74. Positive aspects mentioned were the city building, large amount of content, visually appealing 3D graphics and professional sound and music. However, there were complaints centering around crashes, user interface issues, lag problems and repetitive game play.

The Australian video game talk show Good Game's two reviewers gave the game a 6/10 and 8/10.
