= Megacity (video game) =

2011 puzzle game

MegaCity
- Developer: ColePowered Games
- Platforms: iOS, Android, Xbox 360
- Release: iOS: August 2, 2011; X360: April 2, 2012; DROI: November 19, 2012
- Genres: Puzzle, city-building
- Mode: Single-player

Megacity (stylized as MegaCity) is a 2011 puzzle video game created by the British studio ColePowered Games. It was released for iOS, Xbox 360 and Android, on August 2, 2011.

== Gameplay ==
In Megacity, the player is given a grid of 42 plots with an endless list of possible buildings. Clicking on each plot places a building from the topmost item on that list, which can affect other surrounding plots by either increasing or decreasing their value. For example, placing a hospital will increase the score for residential buildings, while buildings including prisons and factories lower it. Once a column of plots gain a certain total value, it is cleared from the grid, and the player earns points. A game over state is triggered once every plot is filled, and extra content is unlocked as more time is spent playing.

== Reception ==
Reception

Aggregate score
Aggregator	Score
Metacritic	86/100

Review score
Publication	Score
TouchArcade	4/5

The game has a Metacritic rating of 86/100 based on four reviews. Multiple reviewers gave positive scores.
