= Lords of Magic =

1997 video game

- Special Edition cover art
- Developer: Impressions Games
- Publisher: Sierra On-Line
- Director: Chris Beatrice
- Producer: Glenn Oliver
- Designers: Jeffrey Fiske; Gregor Koomey; Steven Serafino
- Programmer: Mike Gingerich
- Composer: Keith Zizza
- Platform: Microsoft Windows
- Release: NA: December 2, 1997; EU: 1997; Special Edition: NA: September 15, 1998; EU: 1998
- Genre: Turn-based strategy
- Modes: Single-player multiplayer

Lords of Magic is a turn-based strategy Microsoft Windows game designed for Windows 95/98 by Sierra On-Line. The game was intended to combine elements of Heroes of Might and Magic II and Lords of the Realm II. The special edition also contains the Legends of Urak quest pack, a set of five individual quests that revolve around stories unrelated to the main plot of the game.

== Gameplay ==
The world is filled with wandering monsters and fixed buildings filled with monsters. Lords of Magic is notably different from other strategy games in that it has only one map, with each faith starting at a different location. This results in a somewhat repetitive nature, counteracted somewhat by a supplied map editor.

Throughout the game, players travel across the high-fantasy land of Urak (which is split into 8 distinct regions, one for each faith), building an army composed of archers, infantry, cavalry, and creatures. The overworld map gameplay is turn-based; here, players manage cities and move their armies. When beginning a battle, the gameplay switches to real-time. Champions and Lords can be equipped with treasures found throughout dungeons or from other factions. As the game progresses, many faithless marauding parties will attempt to disrupt the faith's economies and progress. There is also a loose diplomacy system that can be used to interact with other factions as well for trade or the exchange of research.

The main goal of the game is to defeat Balkoth, Lord of Death, by any means necessary. After finishing the game once, players can begin a new game as Balkoth with the goal of conquering all of Urak.

Lords are the avatar characters used by the player. They are like champions but coloured differently and have higher stats. When a lord dies, the faith is removed from play, unless the player has obtained an "heir". Heirs are obtained by befriending another faith, and then liberating their great temple before they have, in which case the faith becomes the player's and their lord in turn becomes the heir.

There are eight different factions: life, death, order, chaos, air, earth, fire, and water. Each faction represents its element with its own set of units, heroes and spells. The Heroes of the game consist of three different types which offer unique gameplay and tactics. They are Warrior, Thief and Mage. The Warrior is a close combat specialist who is best at leading armies into battle. The Thief works best alone, being able to steal money and spy. The Thief can even kidnap other heroes, ransoming them for money and artefacts. The Mage is very weak with low hit points but can use spells which can change the entire battle in his army's favour, summoning great monsters or raining down fire and lightning from behind the front lines. There are over 160 different spells and they are different for each faction. These spells are divided into four types: "offensive", "defensive", "overland" and "general knowledge". There are over 90 different artefacts as well to discover and collect.

The game includes a single-player mode and limited multiplayer features on LAN and the Internet as well.

== Story ==
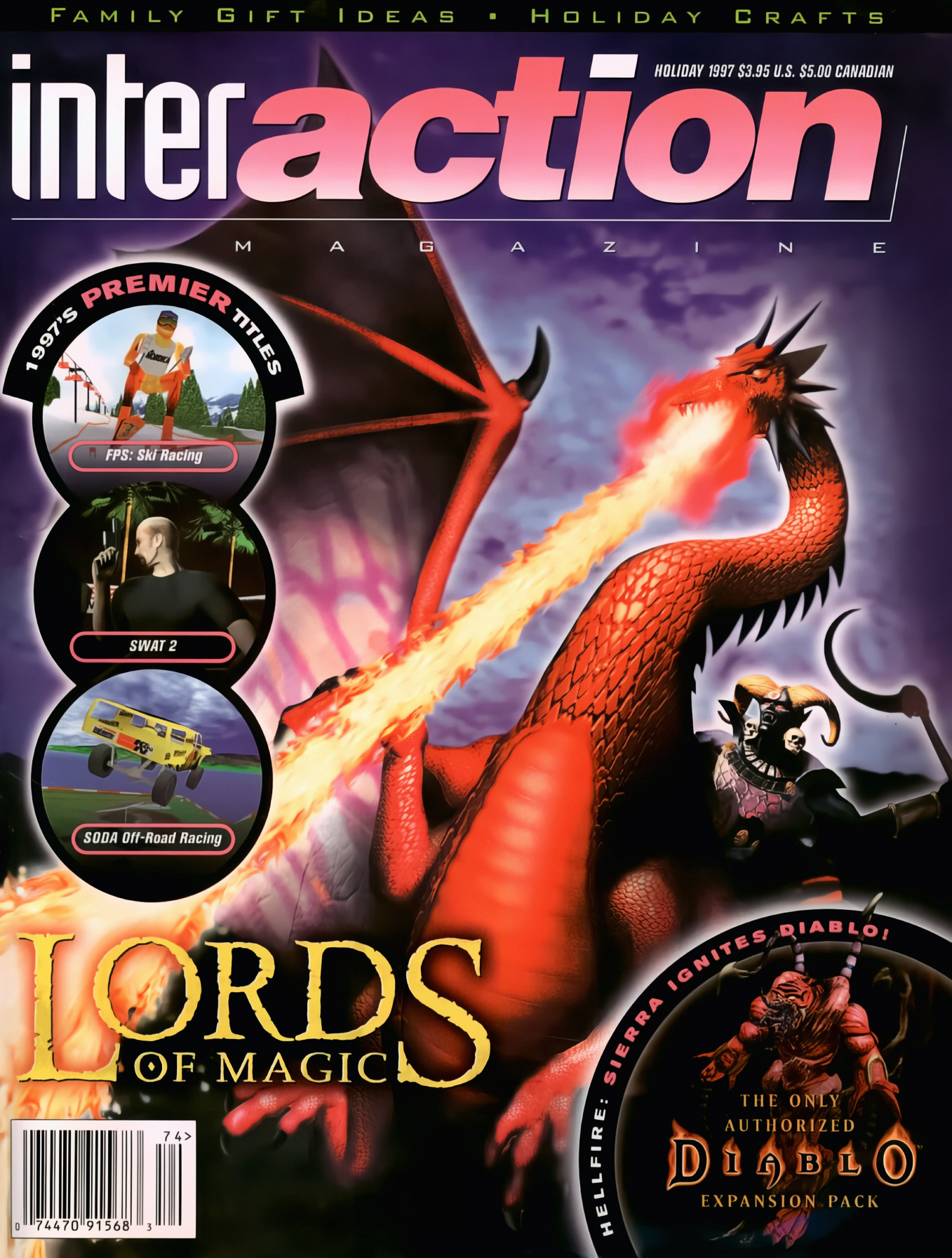
Lords of Magic on the cover of Interaction, the Sierra On-Line fan magazine.

The game takes place in the land of Urak. The people of this world worship one of eight religions. Each religion has an opposite in the circle of life and the people of those faiths are bitter enemies. The atmosphere of the game is high fantasy, loosely inspired by the works of Tolkien, as well as Dungeons & Dragons. Balkoth, the lord of Death, has embarked on a campaign to destroy all other faiths in honor of the dark god Golgoth. The other lords scramble to expand their ranks to defend themselves against this dark threat but also to once and for all destroy their lifelong nemesis.

Each faith has its own weaknesses and strengths. One of these considerations is that each faith's polar opposite (e.g., Chaos vs. Order, Fire vs. Water) begins the game extremely hostile to its counterpart. Diplomacy is possible between these factions but difficult. However, all faiths (other than Death itself, which strives for global conquest) have the same ultimate goal: to defeat Death.

- Life – Referred to as the "Eldren", the followers of life are elves who fight with oaken staves and bows. Their structures are carved out of trees with white bark and golden leaves and they are at home in the woods. Their land is a distinct vibrant green. Life has the strongest archers in the game but suffers from weak melee fighters. Eventually, they can summon Pegasus riders and the mighty phoenix.
- Death – The Dark Elves who follow Golgoth. They inhabit the swamps and marshes of Urak and are feared for their potent necromancy, spear-throwers and cavalry. They have very few weaknesses, the greatest one being that other faiths are initially hostile toward them, and their relationships will automatically depreciate over time. Their special creatures are vampires and lichs.
- Earth – Based heavily on the hobbits and dwarves of Tolkien, the Earth-Folk live in giant mushrooms and earthen burrows. They have the slowest movement speed of any faction, an often crippling weakness, but make up for it with the endurance and strength of their warriors. They can summon golems and the Great Worm.
- Air – In Urak, both storm giants and fairies make their homes among the clouds. Air Mages are renowned for their incredible magic and their giants wield massive swords that can topple foes. They suffer from weak cavalry but typically their armies march quickly and unhindered. Eventually, they can summon a storm dragon.
- Fire – The volcanoes and lava-filled caves are home to the faith of Fire, a people composed of both Giants and Dwarves. Their magic is destructive and their offense relentless. They can do large amounts of damage but often can't handle much themselves. They can eventually summon a mighty dragon who can destroy armies on its own.
- Water – The Amazons rule the waters in Urak. The Water people live in coral-encrusted homes by the shores. They benefit from the strongest ships in the game by a margin so large that most faiths can't even compete for dominance. They also have strong cavalry and warriors and quick scouts. They suffer from lacking a special creature that succeeds on land and from poor archers. They are the only faith that can summon more than one legendary creature, the Giant Arachnids.
- Order – Heavily based on the legends of Camelot, the members of Order represent a typical medieval fighting force. Plate-armoured knights and hardy crossbowmen make up their ranks. The faction of Order is the most well-rounded in the game but suffers from not excelling in any field. Also, in the regular game, their city is found close to the centre of the game world, so an Order player who makes many enemies will quickly realize they have bitten off more than they can chew. Their special creatures are spirit warriors and Sir Lancelot of the Lake; when fully levelled, Lancelot is superior to the special creatures of the other factions.
- Chaos – Barbarians who roam the mountain and plains of Urak. Living in a tribal society, these warriors excel at brute force but lack in defence and marksmanship. Their warriors and horsemen can strike fear into many, but their laughable stick throwers make effective ranged attacks next to impossible. They can summon a Hydra as their special creature. They also benefit, and sometimes suffer, from a chance-based magic system. Their spells can either do great harm to their enemies, or themselves.

== Development ==
Lords of Magic was developed by Impressions Games for Microsoft Windows and released by Sierra Entertainment in December 1997.

=== Legends of Urak expansion ===
Legends of Urak expansion pack was released in 1998. It was included in the Special Edition of the game, released on 30 September 1998. The expansion revolves around various fables and stories. Earth, Fire, and Death each have a unique quest while Order has two quests.

The Earth quest is based on the epic poem Beowulf but involves many original battles and adventures Beowulf partakes in. The Fire Quest revolves around a fire sorceress named Crispin who seeks out and slays a colossal ice drake to return the flow of lava to the fire capital. The Death adventure focuses on the necromancer's ability to raise the dead and employ them in battle. The adventure ends either by defeating a lich in battle and retrieving his staff for the death lord or by keeping the staff, taking control of the death capital and defeating the eldren queen. The first Order adventure is loosely based on the legends of Merlin and King Arthur and ends with the retrieval of the Holy Grail and the death of Mordred. The second Order adventure is only activated by clicking in the centre of the circle of life in the quests menu and has a unique lord named Sigfried who transforms as the game progresses. He saves the valkyrie Brunhilde and defeats Attila the Hun.

=== Legacy ===
To run on most modern operating systems adjust the screen resolution to 800 X 600. The current known highest playable resolution is 1360 X 768.

After the end of the official support with patch 3.01 for the Special Edition, the game's community tried to take over the support and created its own fan patches to address remaining issues and enhance compatibility.

== Reception ==
=== Lords of Magic ===
Lords of Magic

Aggregate score
Aggregator	Score
GameRankings	77%

Review scores
Publication	Score
CNET Gamecenter	4/10
Computer Games Strategy Plus	3/5
Computer Gaming World	1/5
GameRevolution	B+
GameSpot	6.3/10
GameStar	85%
PC Gamer (UK)	56%
PC Gamer (US)	82%
PC PowerPlay	74%
PC Zone	78%

Lords of Magic received average reviews.

=== Special Edition ===
Lords of Magic: Special Edition

Aggregate score
Aggregator	Score
GameRankings	74%

Review scores
Publication	Score
Computer Games Strategy Plus	4/5
Computer Gaming World	3/5
EP Daily	6.5/10
GameSpot	7/10
GameStar	85%

The Special Edition received above-average reviews according to the review aggregation website GameRankings.
