= BreakAway Games =

American video game developer

- Founded: 1998
- Founder: Douglas A Whatley
- Number of employees: 40 (2013)
- Website: breakawaygames.com

BreakAway Games is a video game developer based in Hunt Valley, Maryland, United States, established in 1998. Their executive staff is composed of several veterans from companies such as MicroProse, Origin Systems, Atari and Acclaim Entertainment.

BreakAway Games first established themselves in the strategy game market with titles such as Sid Meier's Antietam! (1998), the 2000 expansion Cleopatra: Queen of the Nile for Pharaoh, Waterloo: Napoleon's Last Battle (2001), Austerlitz: Napoleon's Greatest Victory (2002), the Paradise Island expansion for Tropico, Emperor: Rise of the Middle Kingdom (2002), and the 2003 expansion Civilization III: Conquests. EA Los Angeles tasked them with the development of two expansion packs for their games: The Rise of the Witch-king for The Battle for Middle-Earth II in 2006 and Kane's Wrath for Command & Conquer 3: Tiberium Wars in 2008.

BreakAway is one of the largest developers of serious games, having developed several high-profile serious games for the U.S. military and the U.S. Department of Justice as well as various health and charity organizations. The company has strategic relationships with AAI, Boeing, Booz Allen Hamilton, GMA Industries, and General Dynamics, among others. The United States Army Training and Doctrine Command, the Office of the Secretary of Defense (OSD), the Army War College, the Navy War College, the National Defense University, the United States Joint Forces Command Joint Experimentation Directorate and many other governmental and military organizations have also used BreakAway-developed software.

BreakAway is also the prime developer of Pulse!!, a medical treatment training simulation being developed in conjunction with Texas A&M University in Corpus Christi, Texas.

== History ==
BreakAway Games was founded in part by Doug Whatley, who served as product developer at OT Sports.
