= Zeus: Master of Olympus =

2000 video game

- Developer: Impressions Games
- Publisher: Sierra Studios
- Producer: Ken Parker
- Designer: Chris Beatrice
- Programmer: Mike Gingerich
- Artist: Darrin Horbal
- Writer: Lisa Gagnon
- Composers: Henry Beckett; Keith Zizza
- Series: City Building
- Platform: Microsoft Windows
- Release: NA: October 16, 2000; EU: November 17, 2000; Poseidon: Master of Atlantis: NA: June 25, 2001; EU: August 24, 2001
- Genre: City-building
- Mode: Single player

Zeus: Master of Olympus is a single-player strategy game developed by Impressions Games and published by Sierra Studios. It is considered to be an additional installment in the City Building series of games. Like previous titles in the series, Zeus focuses on the building and development of a city in ancient times. The game features a number of changes from previous titles in the series, including being set in Ancient Greece as well as changes to certain gameplay mechanics; however, it is considered to be in most aspects very similar to its predecessor, Caesar III.

== Game setting and mechanics ==
Zeus is set in a mythical version of ancient Greece and features many of the gods from the Greek pantheon and legendary monsters from ancient Greek mythology. The game chooses not to accurately portray the historical setting in which it is based, choosing instead to include elements based on mythology and anachronisms.

The player is in charge of building up and governing a city state which requires managing infrastructure, farming, industries, commerce, religion, entertainment and education, as well as wars with rival cities. Monsters from Greek mythology feature in the form of natural disasters which must be managed by the player, typically by hiring the correct hero. Sufficiently worshiping the Greek gods will cause them to bestow blessings on the player's city which provide a material benefit.

The game features 2D graphics and offers an isometric view of the game world. A side panel and a number of menus allow the player to more easily navigate the map and to micro-manage various aspects of government, such as tax rates and wages.

Zeus grants players the choice to play either a series of episodical, story-based adventures, in which a set of unique objectives must be attained in order to progress, or to play the so-called "sandbox mode", in which the game's objectives are more open-ended and less objective-based.

== Reception ==
Zeus: Master of Olympus

Aggregate score
Aggregator	Score
Metacritic	87/100

Review scores
Publication	Score
4Players	85%
CNET Gamecenter	9/10
Computer Games Strategy Plus	4/5
Computer Gaming World	3.5/5
EP Daily	7/10
Eurogamer	9/10
Game Informer	8.5/10
GameRevolution	B
GameSpot	8.6/10
GameSpy	90%
IGN	9.1/10
Next Generation	4/5
PC Gamer (US)	68%

Zeus: Master of Olympus received "generally favorable reviews" according to the review aggregation website Metacritic. IGN reviewer Steve Butts stated that he "had to tear [himself] away from [the game] to write the review." The game received criticism for its combat and war mechanics.

Jason Samuel of NextGen said of the game, "Overall, it's simpler, the gameplay is finely tuned, and most of all, it's fun." Brian Wright of GamePro said, "With the various adventures, sandbox modes, and tons of micro-management, Zeus: Master of Olympus will keep city building fans occupied for hours, and with its simple control and multiple difficulty levels, it's a great introduction for newcomers as well." (Note: GamePro gave the original game two 4/5 for graphics and fun factor, and two 4.5/5 scores for sound and control.)

The game was a nominee for "PC Strategy Game of the Year" at the Academy of Interactive Arts & Sciences' 4th Annual Interactive Achievement Awards, which ultimately was awarded to Age of Empires II: The Conquerors.

In May 2012 the game was re-released on GOG.com together with its expansion as a part of the Acropolis bundle where it holds a 5-star rating.

In 2018, Alice Bell of Rock Paper Shotgun included the game in the site's "Have You Played" series, describing it as "the perfect balance of beauty, difficulty, detail, and puns." The same publication later listed the game in its top twenty management games on PC to play in 2021.

In Poland, the localized version – Zeus: Pan Olimpu – was recommended by the Ministry of National Education as a teaching aid for history lessons in middle and secondary schools, and with time become cult favourite.

== Expansion ==
The cover art for Poseidon: Master of Atlantis

As with Pharaoh, an expansion pack was released in 2001, named Poseidon: Master of Atlantis. The expansion includes new adventures based on the stories of Atlantis by Plato. An adventure editor was also included, although it had already been freely available on Impressions website.

=== Reception ===
Poseidon: Master of Atlantis

Aggregate score
Aggregator	Score
Metacritic	84/100

Review scores
Publication	Score
4Players	80%
Computer Games Magazine	4/5
Computer Gaming World	3/5
Game Informer	8/10
GameSpot	8.5/10
GameSpy	85%
IGN	8.5/10

Poseidon received "favorable" reviews according to Metacritic.
