= Caesar II =

1995 video game

- Developer: Impressions Games
- Publisher: Sierra On-Line
- Designers: Christopher J. Foster; David Lester
- Programmer: Simon Bradbury
- Artist: Chris Beatrice
- Composers: Jeremy A. Bell; Jason P. Rinaldi
- Series: City Building
- Platforms: MS-DOS/Windows, Macintosh
- Release: 4 September 1995; 1996 (Macintosh)
- Genre: City-building
- Mode: Single-player

Caesar II is a 1995 video game of the Caesar video game series that takes place in Ancient Rome. It is the second game in the City Building series.

== Gameplay ==
When the game begins the Roman empire extends no further than Italy. Players have the opportunity to civilize adjacent barbarian provinces, eventually reaching the entire Roman Empire at its height. When a province is civilized it unlocks the surrounding provinces. A computerized rival also completes missions both preventing the player from civilizing that province and allowing them to civilize the provinces adjacent to it (the computer has been known to civilize a province it could not have selected when it successfully civilized the last, meaning it is a randomized event, rather than AI). Unlike Caesar III, or Pharaoh, the province and city are separate spheres, as is the military. The player builds primary sector facilities (such as mines or farms), trade facilities (such as roads or docks), and military facilities (such as forts and walls) on one map and builds their city houses, secondary sector facilities (such as wineries or potters), and tertiary sector facilities (such as fire stations, police stations, bath houses) on another (represented as four squares in the center of the provincial map). Also unlike later games walkers are not required to bring services to people, which is instead determined by one buildings distance from another. Invading Armies differ from later games as well, in that Barbarian towns exist within many provinces from which Barbarian armies can emanate. These are converted to Roman towns through invading them and defeating the inhabitants. Most missions require the player to pacify a province and raise the citizens standard of living to a certain level, while neither suffering a military loss, nor losing the emperor's favour, often within a certain time frame. Major factors in city and province-building are housing values and types of housing, unemployment/labour shortages, taxes, wages, deficits, food shortages, military readiness and morale, and imperial demands. The game is won when the player has conquered sufficient provinces to attain the rank of Caesar. The game is lost if the player's computerized rival becomes Caesar, if Caesar removes the player from their post for running too large a deficit, for going beyond the time frame, for failing to follow Imperial demands, or having the city conquered.

== Reception ==
Reception

Review scores
Publication	Score
Computer Gaming World	4/5
Next Generation	4/5
Computer Games Strategy Plus	4/5
MacUser	4/5
Computer Game Review	94/91/92
PC Entertainment	4/5

Initial reception of the game was positive. Arinn Dembo writing for Computer Gaming World gave the game 4 stars. A reviewer for Next Generation deemed it "an innovative mix of SimCity-type building strategy and wargame campaign." He said the game's strongest point is how it expands from a city-building simulation into nation-building and wargames, but also highly praised the graphics and simple, easy-to-grasp interface. He scored the game 4 out of 5 stars.

Caesar II was a runner-up for Computer Gaming World's 1995 "Strategy Game of the Year" award, which ultimately went to Command & Conquer and Heroes of Might and Magic (tie). The editors wrote that Caesar II "surpassed the original with SVGA graphics and an actual combat module", and noted that it "could have won had the competition not been so strong." PC Gamer also nominated Caesar II as the best strategy game of 1995, although it lost to Command & Conquer.

Caesar II and its predecessor were named, collectively, the 96th best computer game ever by PC Gamer UK in 1997. The editors wrote, "Impressions keep on keeping on with the likes of Lords of the Realm [...] but have never managed to regain the dizzy peak they climbed with their handsome brace of think-'em-ups."

According to Sierra On-Line, combined sales of Caesar and Caesar II surpassed 400,000 units by the end of March 1996. Caesar II alone sold above 500,000 units by late 1998, and ultimately reached 2.5 million sales worldwide.
