= Hinterland (video game) =

2008 video game

- Developer: Tilted Mill Entertainment
- Publisher: Tilted Mill Entertainment
- Engine: Torque
- Platform: Microsoft Windows
- Release: September 30, 2008; March 25, 2009 (Orc Lords)
- Genres: RPG, City-Builder
- Mode: Single-player

Hinterland is a high fantasy role-playing video game with city-building elements by Tilted Mill Entertainment. It was released on September 30, 2008 on the Steam content delivery system, and has since been made available at other digital distribution websites. Hinterland: Orc Lords, a cumulative expansion, was released to digital distribution and retail in March 2009. As the title suggests, the primary addition to the game was the ability to play as Orc characters.

== Overview ==
The goal is to establish and grow a village successfully in the wilderness of a fantasy kingdom, clearing out all nearby threats. The game is set in a world roughly based on the lore of both the Norse and the Celts and features characters and creatures of fantasy which inhabit the lands surrounding the village.

The player controls an adventurer acting as the leader of the settlement and is required both to defend it from attacks and to provide funding for its expansion. While the player's profession is chosen from among a number that specializes in combat, city management, or resource gathering, other non-player characters with more menial professions also periodically visit the village. These peasants and tradesmen can be persuaded to settle in the village if their requirements are met and a home is constructed for them (at the player's expense). Once resident, they can either perform their designated job function (e.g., growing food or smithing weapons), or be conscripted to join the player on expeditions into the unknown.

From an adventuring perspective, the player (and up to three followers drafted from the village) must clear out small zones of enemy resistance in order to claim these for the kingdom. Each zone is populated by fewer than a dozen enemies and is denoted with an icon indicating how difficult the zone is expected to be to conquer. Once a zone is cleared, the player gains access to any resources located within, and may also be rewarded with bonus treasure. The number of zones depends on the game length (size) selected when starting the game.

The primary challenge of the game is keeping the village safe while adventuring to find much needed resources for its expansion. Choices must also be made into how to allocate funds in terms of upgrading existing dwellings or adding new ones.

== Development ==
Hinterland draws inspiration from a variety of fantasy titles, including Rogue and Roguelikes, as well as numerous building and simulation games. According to the developers, the title attempts to address a missed opportunity within the role-playing genre where the player's actions have consequences for the other inhabitants of the game world. They note, "Hinterland gives depth and context to the RPG experience, by allowing you to do something more meaningful with the spoils from your RPG adventures. Rather than just re-invest in yourself, you build something much bigger than yourself, that 'other character' - your village and its people."

== Reception ==
Hinterland received an average of 69% out of 7 reviews at GameRankings, while Metacritic gave it a score of 66 out of 100, based on 8 reviews. GameSpy rated Hinterland 3.5 out of 5 ("Good"), citing positives such as the low price, low time investment, and random map generation while deriding it for low-quality animation, simplistic city-building, and low amount of feedback from various in-game events. The IGN review praised the interweaving of the city management and adventuring aspects, while pointing out negatives including a clumsy interface and some minor technical problems. IGN concluded, "For $20 USD, it's a lot of game for your dollar", earning it a score of 7.2 out of 10 (Decent).
