= SimCity Societies =

2007 video game

- Developer: Tilted Mill Entertainment
- Publisher: Electronic Arts
- Producer: Mat Williams
- Designer: Chris Beatrice
- Programmer: Mike Gingerich
- Artist: Mike Malone
- Writer: Andrew Bradley
- Composer: Trevor Morris
- Series: SimCity
- Platforms: Microsoft Windows, mobile phones, Windows Phone, BlackBerry
- Release: Windows: NA: November 13, 2007; AU: November 15, 2007; EU: November 16, 2007; Mobile; 2007; Windows Phone; May 7, 2009; BlackBerry; August 14, 2009; SimCity Societies: Destinations; June 23, 2008
- Genre: City-building
- Mode: Single-player

SimCity Societies is a city-building simulation video game developed by Tilted Mill Entertainment and published by Electronic Arts, and is part of the SimCity series. The gameplay is significantly different from previous SimCity titles, with a greater focus on social development. SimCity Societies was released in 2007, and received mixed reviews, with praise for the game's improved accessibility and visuals, but criticism for being oversimplified and having poor performance.

== Gameplay ==
A city, showing the day and night cycle in the game

SimCity Societies has a different style of gameplay compared to previous SimCity titles, with less focus on "stricter city-planner roles", and more focus on "social-engineering". Tilted Mill Entertainment also reduced the complexity of SimCity Societies after the previous games in the series had been described as too complex by Will Wright. Complexity was reduced by removing the need to lay pipes and power grids. The ability to fund buildings individually, building evolution, and zoning were also not featured in the game. The adviser system of previous SimCity games was replaced, with a city's status instead indicated to the player by the behaviour of citizens, with each building having an effect on citizens' behaviour. Furthermore, there was an awards system to give players access to new buildings and other features when they meet certain goals.

Six "societal values" feature in SimCity Societies, which determine the attributes of a city. The six societal values are productivity, prosperity, creativity, spirituality, authority, and knowledge. Focusing on a certain "societal value" can change the visual appearance of a city, for instance the authority "societal value" can result in security cameras appearing on buildings. "Societal values" can also affect what buildings are unlocked by the player.

The game is "fully customizable" and allows the player to customize individual buildings, decorations, citizens, and game rules. Prior to its release, when mentioning the depth to which the game would allow customization, a Tilted Mill Entertainment representative stated that people who were proficient in C# and XML will be able to easily edit the gameplay. It was also announced that an online exchange would be provided to allow for the exchange of buildings.

== Development ==
On June 5, 2007, Tilted Mill Entertainment announced that it would be developing SimCity Societies instead of Maxis, which had developed SimCity 4. Maxis did not develop the game due to their focus instead being on the development of Spore. Immediate reaction was negative, especially on the official forums of the developer towards this game. Responses directly from the developers attempted to ease some concerns.

== Reception ==
SimCity Societies

Aggregate scores
Aggregator	Score	
Aggregator	mobile	PC
GameRankings	75%	63%
Metacritic	N/A	63 of 100

Review scores
Publication	Score	
Publication	mobile	PC
1Up.com	B	B−
Eurogamer	N/A	5 of 10
Game Informer	N/A	8 of 10
GamePro	N/A	3.25 of 5
GameSpot	N/A	6 of 10
GameSpy	N/A	3/5 stars
GameZone	N/A	8.7 of 10
IGN	8 of 10	5.8 of 10
PC Gamer (UK)	N/A	50%
PC Gamer (US)	N/A	65%

The PC version received "mixed or average" reviews according to the review aggregation website Metacritic. GameZone praised the game's increased accessibility and less "sterile" gameplay compared to previous titles in the SimCity series, and Game Informer concluded that the changes to the gameplay were "inventive". 1Up.com compared the same PC version to The Sims series and described the gameplay as being "addictive enough" and having "the pervasive sensation that your city is a single entity" with features, such as achievement awards, to keep players interested. Computer performance and lack of information within the game were however criticized.

GamePro described the same PC version as excessively "simplified" and "exceptionally easy" with "frame-rate woes". The review concluded that the game "tries to take the franchise in a better direction but it ultimately gets lost along the way". GameSpot stated that the game was a "lackluster spinoff", and although their review praised the game's visuals and sound effects, it described the graphics as "sluggish", and criticized the gameplay for a lack of connection between sim happiness and "societal values", as well as being too easy. GameSpy's review concluded that the PC version "may be enjoyable" to casual users, but it lacks the depth of gameplay for "hardcore" gamers. It also commented on the "weighty system requirements" of the game. IGN described the gameplay as "too arbitrary" and "confusing" and also commented on the lack of connection between sim happiness and "societal values". The review criticized the lack of realism in the gameplay, giving the example of fire stations making money for the city, but did go on to praise the game's visuals.

In response to criticism, a second update was released to fix bugs and add new features to the game. In this update, three new modes were introduced into the "Creative play" mode. These modes are, in order, "Basic", "Hardcore", and "Nightmare". Basic mode is the easiest of the three but is more difficult than the most challenging mode from the game's release version. Three further updates were later released which added additional features to SimCity Societies including six new game scenarios, city policies such as universal health care, building maintenance costs and city income adjustments, and a UFO attack.

During the 11th Annual Interactive Achievement Awards, SimCity Societies received a nomination for "Cellular Game of the Year" by the Academy of Interactive Arts & Sciences.

== SimCity Societies: Destinations ==
On June 23, 2008, an expansion pack was released titled SimCity Societies: Destinations. The main focus of the game is tourism, with new features that allow players to build tourist destinations.

Screenshot showing the features of SimCity Societies: Destinations

Destinations that can be created by the player include ski resorts, beach resorts, and theme parks. Air travel and water travel have also been introduced to the game, along with an improved map generator.

SimCity Societies: Destinations

Aggregate score
Aggregator	Score
Metacritic	62 of 100

Review scores
Publication	Score
1Up.com	C+
GameSpot	7 of 10
GameZone	7.8 of 10
IGN	6.7 of 10
PC Gamer (UK)	54%

The Destinations expansion received "mixed" reviews according to Metacritic. GameZone described it as a "decent expansion", but "not a must-have one". The review describes the game as more challenging than the original release of SimCity Societies, but "with just enough content to make it new". GameSpot commented that the expansion "makes a decent game a good one", and went on to praise the game's increased complexity. IGN concluded that the expansion "finally starts to make SimCity Societies feel worthy of the SimCity name." Their review acknowledges IGN's criticism of the original game for lack of direction, and praises the expansion pack for improvements to the gameplay. The review however also criticised the game for poor frame rate performance and repetitiveness. 1Up.com also criticised the game's poor performance and described the expansion pack as redundant to the patches available for SimCity Societies.
