= Immortal Cities: Children of the Nile =

2004 city-building video game

- Developer: Tilted Mill Entertainment
- Publishers: NA: Myelin Media; EU: Sega
- Producer: Mat Williams
- Designer: Chris Beatrice
- Programmer: Mike Gingerich
- Writer: Ken Parker
- Composer: Keith Zizza
- Series: City Building
- Engine: Titan 2.0
- Platform: Microsoft Windows
- Release: NA: November 9, 2004; EU: February 4, 2005
- Genre: City building
- Mode: Single player

Immortal Cities: Children of the Nile is a city-building game set in ancient Egypt, developed by Tilted Mill Entertainment. The game was released November 2004 in the United States and February 2005 in Europe. It is part of the City Building series.

== Gameplay ==
Unlike many similar titles, there is no treasury of abstract currency with which the player constructs buildings and issues edicts. Instead, the player designates construction sites for various classes of citizen, who are divided into private workers and government workers. Any citizen who is eligible for social advancement will move in and construct his dwelling, performing the functions of his new profession. Most of these construction sites are free to designate and will be constructed in a few moments by their new occupants, but most government buildings must be constructed with bricks, which are created in government-run brickworks and carried to construction sites by bricklayers.

All citizens, private or government, use bread as a form of currency, and all bread is made from grain grown by farmers of the peasant class, whose numbers are themselves limited by the number and personal wealth of citizens of the noble class. All in-game wealth, therefore, ultimately derives from the estates of the nobility. Harvested food is automatically distributed to the nobility and farmers (with nobility taking a far larger share, based on the size of their townhouse, which is itself based on the amount of food the occupants possess). Shopkeepers, who sell various crafted goods and luxury items, earn food by selling their wares to other citizens. Servants and entertainers earn food by selling their services to the nobility; servants can also work for luxury shopkeepers. Government workers, which include soldiers, priests and scribes, are allotted some of the food which has been taxed by government-employed scribes working as tax assessors; food to be distributed this way is stored in bakeries while the surplus is stored in granaries. The palace of the Pharaoh is a cross between a private townhouse and granary; it receives a percentage of all taxed food, which the palace staff uses to purchase crafted goods for the royal family, which, together with palace enhancements (purchased with government-owned food and bricks), improve the player's prestige rating. Surplus food stored in granaries or the palace may be used in trade or in the various world map-level missions, some of which may be required to complete the scenario.

All citizens' needs must be tended to in order to keep them happy and working efficiently, with upper-class citizens such as nobles requiring the most goods and services to remain happy. All citizens will want common crafted goods and access to religious and healthcare facilities, while upper-class citizens also desire a variety of luxury goods, some of which cannot be made and must be imported. Nobles also require the services of entertainers, who perform in exchange for food, and will eventually wish to purchase a family tomb, which the player must construct and make available to the nobility. All families will desire the services of a priest working as a mortician when a family member dies, regardless of tomb availability. Dissatisfied citizens will stop working and protest; the royal family will never do this, but the player's prestige rating will suffer until their needs are addressed.

Luxury shopkeepers and nobles will have children who can be educated by priests, becoming "graduates" who may perform advanced services like serving as military commanders, working as overseers of the laborers who extract stone and build monuments, or becoming scribes and priests, who provide health care, religious services, education and perform various government administrative duties, like assessing fields for taxation or running exchanges to make shopkeepers more efficient by centralizing the supply of raw materials. The number of "graduates" in a city is unlimited, but only a certain number can be employed as educated workers at a time. This number is determined by the player's prestige rating, which can be increased in various ways, namely: the completion of world map missions; the purchase of palace upgrades and ensuring a wealthy and well-supplied royal family; monumental tomb construction; and propaganda in the form of steles and obelisks commemorating the player's achievements on the world map. Prestige can also be lowered if a member of the royal family dies without being properly mummified by a mortician and interred in a royal tomb; the reduction in prestige is especially high if this family member was the Pharaoh.

== Legacy ==
=== Enhanced Edition ===
On July 8, 2008, Tilted Mill released Children of the Nile: Enhanced Edition, a new enhanced edition of the game with several refinements. Among the changes made were new buildings like the brickyard. On July 10, patch 1.3 for the retail version was released which upgrades it to the enhanced edition. Children of the Nile: Alexandria, an expansion for the Enhanced Edition, was released September 10, 2008.

=== Browser game ===
In-game screenshot of Nile Online

Immortal Cities: Nile Online is a browser-based game set in Ancient Egypt, developed by Tilted Mill. It was released on March 5, 2009.

Like many browser games, there is no set goal. The game is played on an infinite-round basis—there are no resets planned. The main focus of the game is on trading resources in order to increase the player's palace level or number of cities. There is a player versus player aspect that allows players to gain control of "monuments" from either an artificial intelligence force or other players. As of March 3, 2009, there were approximately 5000 registered players.

Part of a discussion about Nile Online, during an interview with Tilted Mill's president, Chris Beatrice, by gamersetwatch.com: "A lot of different goals came together with Nile Online. First we wanted to see if we could make a much simpler, much more accessible and less demanding game that still provided a lot of the city building experience, and also looked really great".

The blog "The Freshman" highlighted the real-time nature of the gameplay, in which the player can start lengthy tasks and return to the game later to find them completed, and described the relative honesty of the players in the game.

Krish Raghav, in his Wall Street Journal blog, commended the game's careful balance of goods, raw materials and trading; the co-operation required between players and the roleplaying effect this has on the game's social aspect; and the "unconscious, tangential teaching and learning of complex economic concepts".

== Reception ==
Reception

Aggregate score
Aggregator	Score
GameRankings	76%

Review scores
Publication	Score
Computer Gaming World	3/5 stars
PC Zone	77/100
Computer Games Magazine	4/5 stars
