= Tilted Mill Entertainment =

Video game developer

Tilted Mill Entertainment, Inc.
- Company type: Private
- Industry: Software & programming
- Founded: 2002
- Founder: Chris Beatrice; Peter Haffenreffer
- Headquarters: Winchester, Massachusetts, United States
- Products: Children of the Nile; Caesar IV; SimCity Societies
- Number of employees: 20
- Website: tiltedmill.com (archived)

Tilted Mill Entertainment is a video game developer located in Winchester, Massachusetts. It was founded in 2002 by former Impressions Games lead designer and general manager Chris Beatrice, business manager Peter Haffenreffer, and designer Jeff Fiske. The studio is known for its city-building games.

The company has employed 20 staff in design, programming, creative, and administrative roles. Tilted Mill is a reference to Don Quixote ("Tilting at windmills"). Tilted Mill developed the fifth game of the SimCity series, titled SimCity Societies (all previous titles had been developed by Maxis). The game, however, was criticized for its lack of the traditional SimCity gaming formula.

On July 11, 2008, Tilted Mill announced the creation of their first independent game titled Hinterland. According to Tilted Mill's website, "In Hinterland, you build up and lead a small village, populated by simple townsfolk struggling to survive and prosper in the wild back country of a medieval fantasy world." The game was released on Steam on 30 September 2008. After starting the development on their next game, Medieval Mayor, the team ceased communication and no more games have been released since then, with Medieval Mayor going into hiatus. No announcements on the fate of the software house has been made, with the last message posted on their Facebook page in 2016.

On May 21, 2025, Chris Beatrice, one of the founders, made a Reddit post on the Tilted Mill subreddit, declaring that the company is back in an active state.

== Video games developed ==
- Immortal Cities: Children of the Nile (2004), a city-building game set in ancient Egypt and published through Myelin Media
  - Children of the Nile: Alexandria (2008), city pack for Children of the Nile.
- Caesar IV (2006), a city-building game set in ancient Rome and published through Sierra Entertainment
- SimCity Societies (2007), a society-building game that is part of the Sim franchise.
  - SimCity Societies: Destinations (2008), expansion set for SimCity Societies.
- Hinterland (2008)
  - Hinterland: Orc Lords (2009)
- Mosby's Confederacy (2008)
- Nile Online (2009), a web game in the same vein as Children of the Nile.
- Medieval Mayor (development paused, permanent hiatus), a city-building game set in the Middle Ages. It marks a return to a 2D game engine, and will focus on a single player experience only.
