= Towns (video game) =

2012 simulation video game

- Developers: SMP, Florian Frankenberger
- Publisher: SMP
- Platforms: Microsoft Windows, Mac OS X, Linux
- Release: WW: November 7, 2012
- Genre: Simulation
- Mode: Single-player

Towns is a 2012 simulation video game. Towns was initially developed by the three-person group SMP, consisting of Xavi Canal, Alex Poysky, and Ben Palgi. In February 2014, development was passed on to Florian Frankenberger. The game's influences are cited as Diablo, Dungeon Keeper and Dwarf Fortress on the official website. It was released on Steam Greenlight on November 7, 2012, as a beta product, causing some who purchased the game to complain that it was not made clear that the game was unfinished. The game was among the first ten games approved from Steam Greenlight to be sold in the Steam store.

Towns is a city-builder game viewed in a top-down isometric view with multiple levels of height, allowing the landscape to boast large hilly areas and deep caverns, and allowing the player to build tall structures, either high in the air, or deep under the ground; beginning a new game, the player has the option of choosing from a number of different biomes such as Grass, Desert, Snow, and so on, with each possessing their own qualities (bananas and radishes can only grow in a jungle biome but it can also generate hostile frogmen, cacti can only grow on a desert biome but they can generate giant scorpions, and so on).

When starting a new game, the player begins with 11 villagers and must gather resources and set aside space for different "rooms" - for example, creating a "Carpenter" room allows the construction of basic and advanced objects made of wood, which leads to a "Masonry" room for items made from stone, and so on.

On 9 February 2014, Canal announced on the Towns official forum that after releasing the latest build, v14, SMP was discontinuing development of the game due to burnout. SMP passed development of the game on to Florian Frankenberger. Frankenberger ended his Towns development on May 6, 2014.

The source code for Towns was released by Canal on April 19th, 2026 alongside a price reduction, and announced via the game's Steam Store page.
