= Powerhouse =

Powerhouse or power house may refer to:

- Power station, a facility (or former facility) for the generation of electric power

== Businesses ==
- Powerhouse Animation Studios, an animation studio
- powerHouse Books, a Brooklyn-based publisher of high-end art and photography books
- Dick Smith Electronics Powerhouse, a chain of electronics stores that operated in Australia and New Zealand
- Powerhouse (retailer), a former electrical goods chain in the United Kingdom

=== Power stations ===
- Power House (Alcatraz), a power station on Alcatraz Island
- Powerhouse Museum, former power station, now science and technology museum in Sydney, Australia
- The Powerhouse (San Luis Obispo, California), former power station on the campus of California Polytechnic State University

=== Venues ===
- Powerhouse, Newcastle upon Tyne, a gay club in Newcastle upon Tyne, Tyne and Wear, UK
- Brisbane Powerhouse, a performing arts center in Brisbane, Queensland, Australia
- Powerhouse, a club overlooking Albert Park and Lake in Melbourne, Australia
- Powerhouse Theater, a collaboration between New York Stage and Film and Vassar College

== Literature ==
- The Power-House, a 1916 novel by John Buchan
- Naomi McDuffie, a DC comics character also known as Powerhouse.
- Powerhouse (Marvel comics), comic book characters
- "Powerhouse", a short story by Eudora Welty

== Music ==
=== Artists ===
- Powerhouse (rock band), a British hard rock band which formed after the breakup of the band Geordie in 1984
- Powerhouse (1997 band), reached #38 in the UK with "Rhythm of the Night" in December 1997
- Powerhouse (1999 band), responsible for 1999's "What You Need"
- Eric Clapton and the Powerhouse, a British blues studio supergroup formed in 1966
- "Powerhouse", an alias used by the composer Simon Power for his 1988 hit "On the Floor"

=== Albums ===
- Powerhouse (Deep Purple album), 1977
- Powerhouse (The Jazz Crusaders album), 1969
- Powerhouse (Kinsey Report album), 1991
- Powerhouse (Mustasch album), 2005
- Powerhouse (Planningtorock album), 2018
- Powerhouse (White Heart album), 1990

=== Songs ===
- "Powerhouse" (instrumental), a 1937 composition by Raymond Scott

== Television ==
- Powerhouse (TV series), a 1982 United States television series
- Power House (talkshow), a Filipino talkshow

== Other uses ==
- Powerhouse Arts District, Jersey City
- PowerHouse (programming language), a 1980s programming language by Cognos Corporation
- PowerHouse (video game), a 1995 computer game by Impressions Games, now part of Vivendi SA
- Powerhouse fruits and vegetables, or superfoods, describing foods with supposed health benefits
- Powerhouse Hobbs (born 1991), ring name of professional wrestler William Hobson
