= Conceptual dictionary =

Dictionary grouped by concept or semantic relation

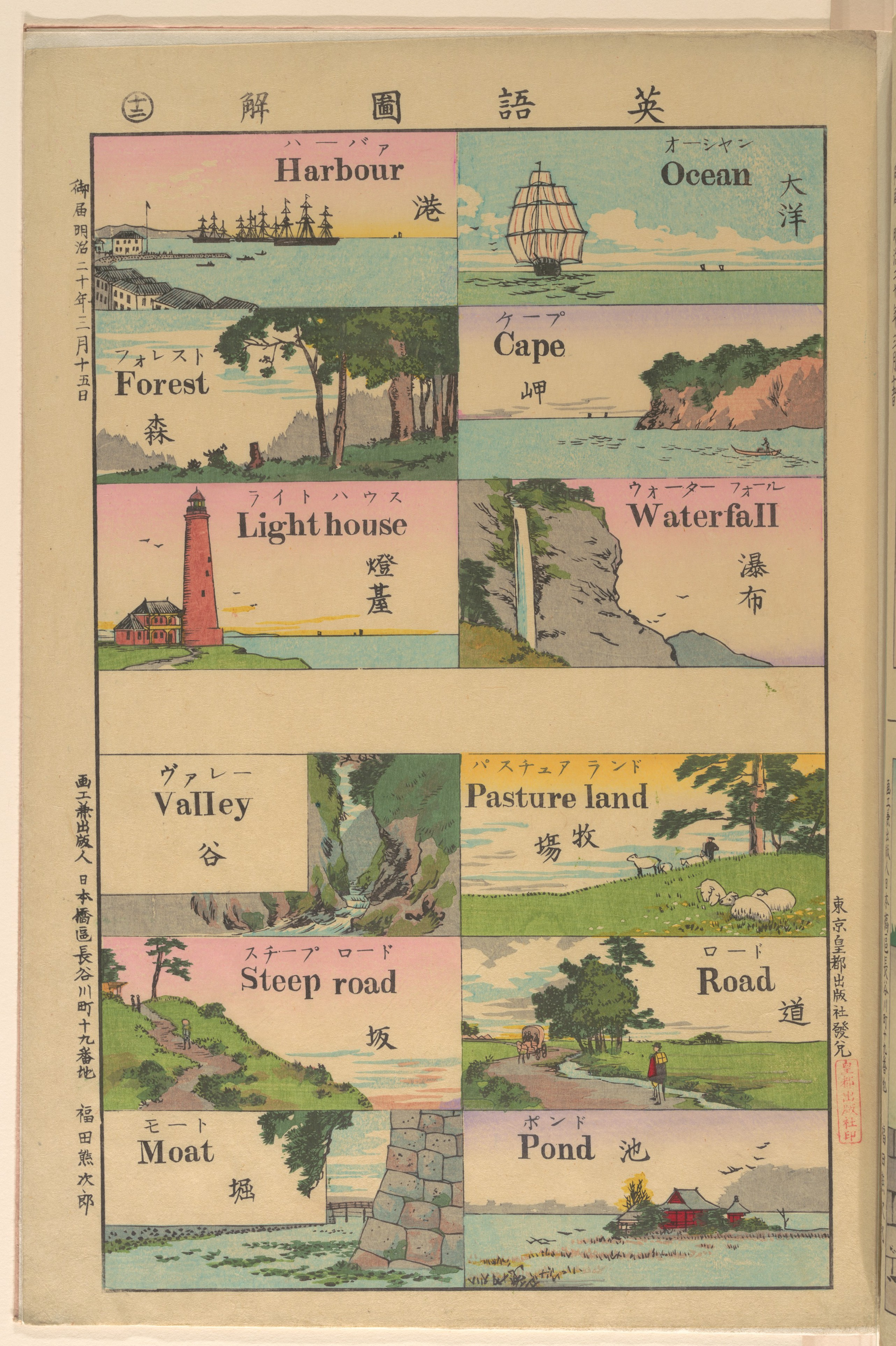
A Japanese visual dictionary (1887).

A conceptual dictionary (also ideographic or ideological dictionary) is a dictionary that groups words by concept or semantic relation instead of arranging them in alphabetical order. Examples of conceptual dictionaries are picture dictionaries, thesauri, and visual dictionaries. Onelook.com and Diccionario Ideológico de la Lengua Española (for Spanish) are specific online and print examples.

This is sometimes called a reverse dictionary because it organized by concepts, phrases, or the definitions rather than headwords. This is similar to a thesaurus, where one can look up a concept by some common, general word, and then find a list of near-synonyms of that word. (For example, in a thesaurus one could look up "doctor" and be presented with such words as healer, physician, surgeon, M.D., medical man, medicine man, academic, professor, scholar, sage, master, expert.) In theory, a reverse dictionary might go further than this, allowing you to find a word by its definition only (for example, to find the word "doctor" knowing only that he is a "person who cures disease"). Such dictionaries have become more practical with the advent of computerized information-storage and retrieval systems (i.e. computer databases).

An example of this type of reverse dictionary is the Diccionario Ideológico de la Lengua Española (Spanish Language Ideological Dictionary). This allows the user to find words based on a small set of general concepts.

== Examples ==
(English)

- Bernstein, Theodore, Bernstein's Reverse Dictionary, Crown, New York, 1975.
- Edmonds, David (ed.), The Oxford Reverse Dictionary, Oxford University Press, Oxford, 1999.
- Kahn, John, Reader's Digest Reverse Dictionary, Reader's Digest, London, 1989.
- https://web.archive.org/web/20180125074625/https://tradisho.com/ Concept based dictionary for the 170+ languages in the Philippines
- Onelook Reverse Dictionary
- ReverseDictionary.org
