= Robert E. Lee: Civil War General =

1996 video game

- Developer: Impressions Games
- Publisher: Sierra On-Line
- Designer: Jeffrey Fiske
- Programmer: Chris Plakyda
- Artist: Chris Beatrice
- Composers: Jason P. Rinaldi; Keith Zizza; Steven Serafino
- Platform: Microsoft Windows
- Release: August 24, 1996
- Genre: Computer wargame
- Modes: Single-player, multiplayer

Robert E. Lee: Civil War General is a 1996 computer wargame developed by Impressions Games and published by Sierra On-Line. Set during the American Civil War, it tasks the player with leading the Confederate Army of Northern Virginia to victory against the Union Army of the Potomac. Impressions sought to make Civil War General accessible to wargame newcomers by streamlining its gameplay, and the Panzer General series was a reference point for its design and title.

Civil War General was a commercial success and the best-selling wargame of 1996. Critics noted its accessibility compared to other games in its genre; several praised it for combining simplified mechanics and depth, while Computer Games Strategy Plus found it overly shallow. In 1997, Civil War General was followed by a sequel, Grant, Lee, Sherman: Civil War Generals 2. A third game was planned, but was cancelled due to low sales projections.

== Gameplay ==
A battle takes place near a creek. The player has selected the leader Barnard Elliott Bee Jr.

Robert E. Lee: Civil War General is a computer wargame with turn-based gameplay, which unfolds on a hex map playing field. Set during the American Civil War, the game casts players in the role of General Robert E. Lee, and tasks them with leading the Confederate Army of Northern Virginia to victory over the Union Army of the Potomac. It portrays eight Civil War conflicts, including the Battle of Gettysburg, the Battle of the Wilderness and a speculative scenario in which Lee lays siege to Washington, D.C.

Each battle lacks a firm victory condition. Instead of winning by holding victory points or destroying all enemy forces, the player's goal is to outperform the opponent overall and to lower enemy morale, in line with the Confederacy's own strategy during the Civil War. As in the historical conflict, battles are asymmetrical, as the player's Confederate troops are limited and undersupplied compared to the Union army.

The game is turn-based and covers seven battles of the Eastern Theater in the Civil War as well as a bonus fictional attack by the Army of Northern Virginia on Washington D.C. Each battle may be played individually or serially in campaign mode. The multi-day battles (Second Bull Run, Chancellorsville, Gettysburg, and Wilderness) may be played from start to finish or the player may start on the second or third day of the battle. Normally, the player may only control the Confederate side however a hidden multiplayer feature is accessible for campaign mode by holding down the Ctrl key while clicking on the "Start New Campaign" button. During campaign mode, the player in between battles may dismiss leaders (excluding corps commanders) and upgrade or downgrade a unit's weapons. Leaders' ratings may improve after a battle.

Units lose a certain number of men to straggling after engaging in combat, changing formation, or moving around the map. By having a unit rest or dig in, stragglers return to the ranks and the unit's stats will increase. The multi-day battles have a day/night cycle; during nighttime the player may not initiate attacks and moving units will have a high cost in health/organization. Units regain more health and organization while resting at night than during daytime. In addition, there is a dawn and dusk turn in which attacks may be performed, but at a higher cost in health and organization than daytime. In addition, units receive a morale penalty from being moved too much at night. Resting units during dawn/dusk will be more effective than daytime, but less than nighttime. Units which rest on a city tile will regain more health and organization than on other terrain types.

Unit leaders may be killed or wounded in combat, in which case the next highest ranking leader underneath them assumes command. In campaign mode, a wounded leader may recover for the next battle, be forced to retire, or die from the wound depending on the severity of his injury. Lightly-wounded leaders will remain in command of their units and lose some of their stats. If a leader was more severely wounded, the game will ask the player if he wants the leader to remain in command. If so, the unit will not be able to move for the rest of the game. Leaders who are killed or sustain major wounds will be automatically replaced by their subordinate. Units in the same command structure as the leader who was killed or wounded will suffer loss of morale. Conversely, a unit that kills or wounds an enemy leader will get a morale boost along with all units in its command structure. Each leader has four rating stats; the higher these are, the more effectively a unit will perform. Each unit furthermore has several stats which also influence its combat strength and effectiveness; the Experience rating goes up between battles if the unit was engaged in the previous battle of a campaign, while the Quality stat drops as the war progresses (reflecting a higher number of conscripts and other lower quality soldiers as time goes on).

The number of casualties a unit inflicts in battle (as well as the likelihood of a leader being killed/wounded) is calculated based on the unit's firepower, weapon type, the unit leader's Influence rating, the unit's Experience and Quality ratings, and the terrain cover the defending unit has.

If a unit is attacked by infantry or cavalry, the defending unit will fire a volley first followed by the attacking unit. The game also allows the player to order a "charge" attack, in which case the attacking unit will attempt to fire two volleys, including a close-range one. Charges can be extremely costly thus should only be used if the enemy unit is significantly weaker, and a unit may refuse to perform a charge if its health, morale, and organization are too low. Army morale points may be expended to "pep talk" a unit into charging.

A unit will retreat from combat if its morale becomes too low and drop some ammunition, and if it gets low enough the unit will rout, in which case it drops all of its ammunition and runs uncontrollably to the rear. Units that retreat from combat suffer an additional morale penalty while a unit that forces an enemy to retreat gets a morale boost. If the unit reaches the edge of the map, it will flee from the field and not be accessible again for the rest of the battle. Similar to charging, the player can expend army morale points to convince a routed unit to reform. Units may be captured whole by the enemy army if surrounded completely and unable to flee anywhere. Ammunition dropped by a fleeing enemy is recovered automatically by the player and added to his total supply points. A unit may also be wiped out of existence if the last man in it is killed or wounded, or it may desert the field if morale drops too low. The game gives your entire army a morale penalty if enough unsuccessful engagements are fought while giving the enemy army a morale bonus.

Armies include several corps commanders which are delineated on the map by a gold star; they can be reassigned to any unit under their command and are treated as the commander of whatever unit they're assigned to. Enemy corps commanders are invisible unless the player engages the unit they're assigned to, in which case the corps commander will be visible until reassigned to another unit.

Most units have a marching and a combat formation. Units in marching formation have less terrain cover and if infantry units are attacked in marching formation, the attacker will fire a volley first, potentially inflicting heavy losses. Artillery units cannot fire back at all if attacked while limbered. Cavalry units have a mounted and dismounted formation and may attack in either one; mounted cavalry have more firepower but less cover which results in higher casualties while attacking or defending. Infantry attacked twice in the same turn from opposite sides will be caught from behind by the second attack and treated as if it were in marching formation.

Artillery units have a certain range of tiles they can hit; this depends on the type of gun the artillery unit is equipped with as well as terrain obstructions. The game takes into account the capabilities of various Civil War artillery types; some artillery is more effective on long-range targets and some types more effective at close range. Artillery may share a tile with other unit types, in which case both units will fire a volley if attacked by infantry or cavalry. When attacking stacked units, the player may target both or just the artillery. The defender can fire back if his artillery has enough range for counter-fire or he can have his artillery limber and retreat, in which case some of its ammunition will be lost.

Sharpshooter units (referred to in the game as "specialists") have a ranged attack similar to artillery, but must move right next to an enemy unit to attack. If attacking a stacked artillery and combat unit, the player must select which one to attack and cannot target both units.

The game includes several terrain types which have varying movement, health, and organization costs for a unit as well as different amounts of cover or lack thereof. Certain terrain types may increase or decrease a unit's morale, and units cannot switch from marching to combat formation on some terrain. Units may also dig in, which increases their cover. Tiles may contain various structures ranging from farmhouses to churches; these can also affect the cover or morale bonus/minus of the tile. Rivers are completely impassable unless a bridge or ford is present (the latter are invisible and require the player to search around the map for them).

A number of different weapons are available to units; the game includes most of the more commonly used infantry, artillery, and cavalry weapons from the Civil War. The armies of both sides have certain weapons available exclusively to them, and the Confederate side does not have access to certain more powerful weapons. A unit will have higher morale the better weapons they're carrying, but stronger weapons also use more expensive ammunition than weaker ones.

At the end of a battle, the game displays a stat screen showing the number of casualties on both sides, leaders killed/wounded, men captured/deserted, supply points and weapons cost captured, and total score. At any time during a battle, the player can also access the stat screen through the "Casualty Report" option in the "Reports" menu.

== Development ==
Robert E. Lee: Civil War General was designed by Jeffrey Fiske and developed by Impressions Games, a company previously responsible for the Civil War-themed wargame The Blue & the Gray. Sierra On-Line, which had purchased the developer in 1995, served as the new game's publisher. Civil War General began as a remake of Impressions' earlier wargame Front Lines—whose graphics technology the developer found successful, but whose gameplay it disliked—that reworked the engine to focus on the Civil War. However, the team organically drifted away from this framework as development progressed, until the project crystallized as Civil War General. Initially, Impressions studied history books to research the game, but increasingly relied on Internet research as the project continued. This gave the team access to new data, such as previously inaccessible "personal letters and diaries" that helped them catalog deployment patterns and supplies, according to Sierra's news magazine InterAction. Impressions also worked to reproduce the historical battlefields of the Civil War, including the exact placement of each brigade.

Fiske's core goal with Civil War General was to "create a product that Civil War enthusiasts could play, regardless of prior gaming experience." To this end, he sought to make its gameplay streamlined and intuitive, but without sacrificing historical realism. Fiske noted that the Strategic Simulations (SSI) wargame Panzer General was released as Impressions was first designing Civil War General, and that his team sought to offer accessibility akin to that game's but with greater historical accuracy and realism. Terry Coleman, the wargame columnist for Computer Gaming World, saw Civil War General as part of a trend toward ease-of-use in the computer wargame genre spurred by Panzer General's commercial success. He further noted that Impressions " 'borrowed' half the title" from SSI's game. T. Liam McDonald of PC Gamer US likewise reported that the Civil War General title was chosen to capitalize on the commercial performance of Panzer General and Allied General.

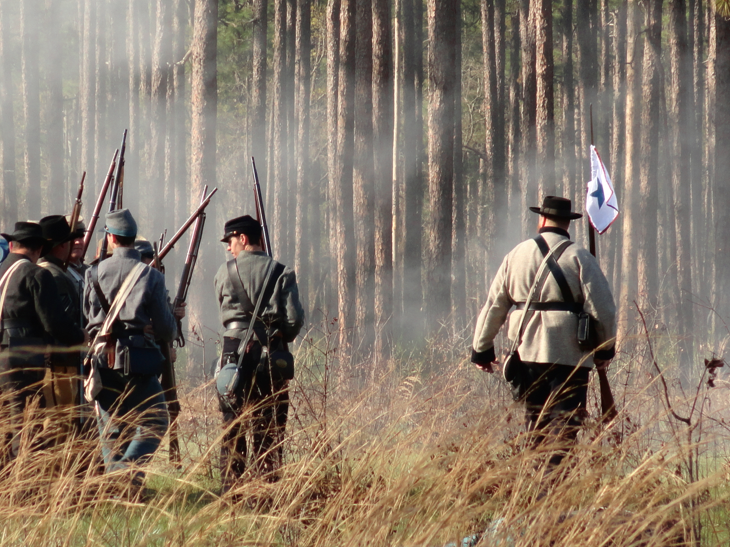
As part of Civil War General's emphasis on multimedia content, full motion video footage of American Civil War reenactors is used throughout the game.

Civil War General was based on Robert E. Lee's campaign against the Army of the Potomac because of his popularity among Civil War enthusiasts, and because Fiske believed that this confrontation "converts to computer gameplay better than any other" from the period. Fiske described the game's design as one of "morale and maneuver", as it focuses on the control of hexagons that increase troop morale, rather than on victory points. Leadership became a key element of the game design, and McDonald noted that the team included "every important Civil War leader ... except for Lee himself, since it is assumed that the player takes on the role of Lee." Fiske's goal was to make the handling of leadership and individual soldiers' personal welfare (such as rest, loyalty and organization) the player's central concerns, which he considered an untried mechanic in wargames. Before the game's release, he wrote that he "wanted a model in which one extra man on your firing line could make a difference".

Impressions placed a heavy emphasis on Civil War General's multimedia content during development, and Sierra's John Sauer described the overall product as a "multimedia game". The team worked with Jay Wertz—creator of the documentary series Smithsonian's Great Battles of the Civil War—to obtain full motion video of American Civil War reenactments for use throughout the game. This came to roughly 140 individual clips, including both Wertz's old work and new footage unique to Civil War General. Paintings by Mort Künstler were licensed for the game's loading screens, box art and main menu screen. Computer Games Strategy Plus reported that Impressions planned Civil War General's encyclopedia to be "as detailed as a dedicated reference CD", with the goal of making it "a tribute to the War." The team designed the encyclopedia in an online help format, and incorporated hyperlinks, sound and music, recorded speech, photographs and animation. This educational entertainment aspect was among the game's selling points.

In late 1995, Sierra's InterAction tentatively announced a 1996 release date for Civil War General, then under the title Robert E. Lee: The War Against the Union. Early the following year, Terry Coleman described Civil War General as one of "the most promising [war]games for '96". T. Liam McDonald opined at the time that "the distribution power of Sierra"—then the number-one computer entertainment software company—gave Impressions a unique opportunity to exploit Panzer General's coattail effect. While Civil War General was estimated as 75% complete and set for an April launch in PC Gamer US's March 1996 issue, by April 10 Sierra had officially pushed this date back to June. In May, the publisher showed the game at the 1996 Electronic Entertainment Expo (E3). Sierra ultimately released Civil War General on August 24, with a list price of $59.95. By December, the team had released a downloadable "Scenario Pack" for the game; a second pack was launched in January 1997.

== Reception ==
=== Sales ===
Civil War General was a commercial success; according to Sierra's InterAction, it was the best-selling wargame of 1996. The game debuted at #14 on NPD SofTrends' computer reference software sales chart for August 1996, and rose to eighth place the following month, at an average retail price of $51.

In 1998, Civil War General secured first place on SofTrends' reference software rankings for January, with an average price of $17. It remained at #1 from February through August, before dropping to #3 in September. By June, its average price had fallen to $10. The game held a position in NPD's top 4 for reference software throughout the rest of 1998. According to PC Data, Civil War General was the United States' 25th-best-selling computer game of 1998, with 225,215 units sold and $2.37 million revenues earned in the region that year. The game's Ultimate Civil War Collection bundle with its sequel, Grant, Lee, Sherman: Civil War Generals 2, rose from 58th place in June 1998 to seventh in July on SofTrends' reference software chart.

By January 1999, Civil War General and its sequel together had sold more than 700,000 copies globally. Civil War General claimed #2 on NPD's reference software rankings that month, and third place in February. At the time, PC Gamer US summarized the series as "very successful".

=== Critical reviews ===
Reception

Review scores
Publication	Score
Computer Gaming World	4/5
PC Gamer (US)	84%
Computer Games Strategy Plus	3/5
PC Magazine	Thumbs up icon
Orange County Register	B+

Awards
Publication	Award
Computer Gaming World	Wargame of the Year (finalist)
Codie awards	"Best Strategy Software Game" (finalist)

Civil War General was a finalist for Computer Gaming World's 1996 "Wargame of the Year" award, which ultimately went to Battleground 4: Shiloh. Similarly, the Software Publishers Association nominated it as 1996's "Best Strategy Software Game", but the judges gave this prize to Monty Python & the Quest for the Holy Grail.

Computer Gaming World's Terry Coleman remarked that Civil War General is "meant to be simpler to play, but it has a lot of subtleties." He argued that its campaign was the most enjoyable of the era's Civil War wargames. However, he criticized the title's limited historical scope, and considered the overall product to be inferior to Wargame Construction Set III: Age of Rifles 1846–1905. Coleman concluded, "[I]f you must buy only one of these, get Rifles, but real Civil War fans should pick up Lee as well". PC Magazine highlighted the game's visuals, and the reviewer praised Civil War General as a "detailed and accurate" product that, echoing Coleman, combines simplicity with depth.

Robert J. Conrad of the Orlando Sentinel called Civil War General "an excellent CD-ROM program", although he criticized its high system requirements. He found the game easy to learn, called its reenactment footage "a wonderful touch" and summarized the package as one that "anyone can enjoy, but Civil War buffs, in particular, can get lost in." Writing for the Orange County Register, Jeff Guinn found the game to be extremely difficult, but felt that it was "cut from different butternut homespun than the generic refight-the-Civil-War play-alikes that have inundated the market." In the Milwaukee Journal Sentinel, Guinn described Civil War General as "the kind of game you'll enjoy playing over and over", despite its difficulty.

In PC Gamer US, William R. Trotter noted that Civil War General was simplified to appeal to a mass-market audience, but he argued that it remained "deep enough to satisfy most hardcore wargamers." In this regard, he compared it to Panzer General. Trotter highly praised the game's reenactment footage, and he summarized Civil War General as "a serious wargame, wrapped in a friendly multimedia package." Conversely, Computer Games Strategy Plus's Robert Mayer considered Civil War General to be a missed opportunity. He called it "another one of the Panzer General's androgynous offspring", and found it to be shallow and simplistic, although he praised its multimedia features and documentation. He argued that it is "a good introduction to wargaming, but one that barely hints at the joys of [the genre's] complexity and detail".

== Aftermath ==
Impressions Games and Sierra On-Line followed Civil War General with a sequel, entitled Grant, Lee, Sherman: Civil War Generals 2. It was designed by Doug Gonya, a scenario designer for Civil War General, and produced by Civil War General's quality assurance manager Steve Grammont. Like its predecessor, it was a commercial success. A third game, Civil War Generals 3, was announced in January 1999. However, it was cancelled in April 2000. According to James Fudge of Computer Games Strategy Plus, this decision was made because the game's projected sales were "barely enough to cover [its] development costs". Despite the cancellation, the Impressions team confirmed that they were interested in developing other wargames in the future.
