= Realia (translation) =

Words and expressions for culture-specific material elements

In translation, realia (plural noun) are words and expressions for culture-specific material elements. The word realia comes from medieval Latin, in which it originally meant "the real things", i.e. material things, as opposed to abstract ones. The Bulgarian translators Vlahov and Florin, who were the first to carry out an in-depth study of realia, coined the modern sense of the word. They indicate that since realia carry a very local overtone, they often pose a challenge for translation. Realia must not be confused with terminology: the latter is primarily used in scientific literature to designate things that pertain to the scientific sphere, and usually only appears in other kinds of texts to serve a very specific stylistic purpose. Realia, on the other hand, are born in popular culture, and are increasingly found in very diverse kinds of texts. Fiction, in particular, is fond of realia for the exotic touch they bring.

== Types and examples of realia ==
Vlahov and Florin classify them into various categories:

=== Geography ===
- physical geography: fjord, mistral, steppe, tornado, tsunami...
- geographic objects tied to man's activity: polder, piazza, bazaar...
- endemic species: kiwi, koala, sequoia, yeti...

=== Ethnography ===
- everyday life: paprika, spaghetti, empanada, cider, bistrot, sauna, kimono, sari, sombrero, jeans, igloo, bungalow...
- work: carabinieri, concierge, machete, bolas...
- art and culture: kozachok, tarantella, banjo, gong, commedia dell’arte, harlequin, bard, geisha, ramadan, Cinco de Mayo, easter, Santa Claus, werewolf, vampire, mormon, quaker, dervish, pagoda, synagogue ...
- ethnic characterizations: cockney, Fritz, gringo, yankee...
- measures and money: mile, kilometer, hectare, gallon, perch, ruble, lira, peseta, talent, greenback...

=== Politics and society ===
- administrative divisions: region, province, department, state, county, canton, principality, favela, bidonville, arrondissement, souk, promenade...
- organs and functions: agora, forum, knesset, duma, senate, chancellor, tzar, shah, pharaoh, vizier, ayatollah, satrap...
- political and social life: peronist, tupamaros, Ku Klux Klan, partigiani, slavophile, lobbying, lord, bolshevik, agrégé, untouchables, samurai, Union Jack, fleur-de-lis...
- military realia: cohort, phalanx, arquebus, AK-47, katyusha, cuirassier...

== Translating realia ==
To translate realia, various strategies exist: they range from phonetic transcription to translation of the overall meaning. Israeli scholar Gideon Toury offers one way of defining such solutions. According to his characterization, each of these can be placed between two extremes: adequacy (closeness to the original) and acceptability (making the word entirely consistent with the target culture). Here are the various possibilities at hand for translating realia:

- Transcribing (i.e. copying) the word, character by character. This is called transliteration when the original word is written in a different alphabet.
- Transcribing according to the target language's pronunciation rules. For instance, the Hindi word Kašmir becomes cachemire in French.
- Creating a new word or a calque, such as the English flea market inspired by the French marché aux puces
- Creating a new word, analogous to the original one, but which has a more local ring to it, e.g. muezzin from the Arabic mu'adhdhin
- Using a different but related word from the source language, passing it off as the original word. For instance, the Italian word cappuccino is often translated into English as latte, which in Italian means "milk".
- Making the meaning explicit, such as jewish temple for synagogue
- Replacing the word with a similar, local one, such as the French art nouveau (literally "new art") for Jugendstil
- Replacing the word with one that is more generic or international, such as red wine for Beaujolais
- Adding an adjective to help the reader identify the origin of the element of realia, as in the Argentine pampa
- Translating the overall meaning. For example, the English sentence Does the National Health Service cover this drug? could become, in an American context, Is this drug expensive?

How suitable each of these solutions is depends on various factors. One of them is the type of text that is being translated. Adequate translations (in Toury's sense) of realia add some exoticism, a quality that is often desirable in fiction. For non-fiction, nowadays adequacy is usually preferred to acceptability, so as to avoid the ambiguity that can arise from the use of more culturally neutral translations – though the opposite preference has prevailed in the past. One must also consider how the element of realia relates to the source culture in terms of importance and familiarity. If, for instance, it is rather common in the source culture, then providing an adequate translation creates an exotic note that was not there in the first place (though this can be justified by the fact that, after all, one is not dealing with an original, but a translation). If, on the contrary, the source culture perceives the element of realia as unusual, unless the translator renders such an element more culturally neutral, readers of the translation will most likely also perceive it as unusual. Another thing to keep in mind when establishing a translation strategy is that not all languages are equally open to "foreignisms", and how familiar speakers of that language may be with the realia one introduces. Some languages, such as Italian, welcome such words and frequently integrate them into their vocabulary. Other languages, on the contrary, have the opposite tendency: they are wary of foreign words and are very impermeable to them. French is a good example of such protectionism. Lastly, the expected readership (which may or may not be similar to that of the original) influences the choice of a suitable translation strategy. For example, the name of a chemical compound will be translated differently depending on whether one expects the text to be read by chemists or schoolchildren.

== See also ==
- American literary regionalism, a literary genre characterized by extensive use of realia
- Anton Popovič
- Translation
- Untranslatability
- Culturally Authentic Pictorial Lexicon
