= Grant, Lee, Sherman: Civil War Generals 2 =

1997 video game

- Developer: Impressions Games
- Publisher: Sierra On-Line
- Director: Chris Beatrice
- Producer: Stephen Grammont
- Designer: Douglas Gonya
- Programmer: Dean Lawson
- Artists: Andrea Muzeroll; Peter Crafts
- Composer: Keith Zizza
- Platform: Microsoft Windows
- Release: NA: October 20, 1997
- Genre: Computer wargame
- Modes: Single-player, multiplayer

Grant, Lee, Sherman: Civil War Generals 2 is a computer game published by Sierra On-Line in 1997. It is the sequel to Robert E. Lee: Civil War General.

== Gameplay ==
Grant, Lee, Sherman: Civil War Generals 2 simulates on a tactical level individual battles of the American Civil War and allows one to play as either the North or South in a number of different campaigns. It links the battles together by making the losses in one battle reflect on the forces available in the next. Also, the capture of supplies during one battle allows one to purchase weapons upgrades before the next.

Improvements from Robert E. Lee: Civil War General included the addition of several new units, including mortars, siege artillery, and naval vessels, new terrain types, more detailed graphics, and larger maps. Certain artillery types gained the ability of indirect fire. Army structures were expanded to include divisions and regiments; scenarios may be played at the brigade or regimental level. If the latter is selected, regiments are controlled as individual units on the map, with brigade commanders taking the place of division commanders and division commanders taking the place of corps commanders. The Easter Egg multiplayer campaign mode from the first game was deleted. Unit leaders may be influenced by their commanding officer and their ratings increased or decreased depending on the superior officer's ratings. A corps or division commander will influence all subordinate units within a three square radius (six squares if playing at regimental level).

The basic elements of gameplay in Civil War Generals 2 are the same as Robert E. Lee and are covered in the article for the latter game.

Corps commanders in Civil War Generals 2 were made into separate units on the map with division commanders taking the place of corps commanders in Robert E. Lee, meaning that they can be reassigned to any unit under their command and are treated by the game as the commander of whatever unit they're assigned to instead of its regular commander. A routed unit will run towards its respective corps headquarters first and then to the edge of the map. The ability to completely annihilate an enemy unit was removed from Civil War Generals 2, as well as the ability to cause a unit to desert if morale becomes too low. The exception to the latter are siege artillery and mortar units, as these are too ponderous to flee the field and will be captured whole or desert if morale drops below a certain point.

New units in Civil War Generals 2 include siege weapons and naval units. Naval units may only enter water/coastal hexes and only the Union side has access to frigates; otherwise, they are functionally the same as artillery. Siege weapons include heavy artillery and mortars; the former carries more powerful, longer-range guns than field artillery, while the latter are functionally the same as howitzer artillery. The effectiveness of mortars decreases the closer to the target they are. Heavy artillery are fixed units that cannot move or retreat. Mortars can be limbered and moved around the map, but very slowly due to their size and they also cannot retreat from an enemy attack.

The game also split horse artillery into a separate unit that is similar to a howitzer, but it can be moved around the map faster than normal artillery and can also change formation and attack in the same turn.

Howitzer-type artillery units may fire at hexes they do not have a direct line of sight on, these are indicated on the map with a grid pattern. Hexes highlighted as such may be fired into even if there's no visible target. This feature may be used if the player has reason to suspect that an unseen enemy unit is in a particular hex. When performing indirect fire, the artillery has a chance of missing the hex it's firing at; it may even hit one of your own units and produce "friendly fire" casualties.

The game also introduced scout units and engineers; these unit types cannot initiate attacks but will defend themselves if attacked. Engineers can perform several different construction/demolition actions, building a pontoon bridge uses up the engineer unit and it will not be accessible for the rest of the game.

A unit's morale is calculated by the game based on the stats of the unit plus its leader's stats, as well as other factors including terrain and success or defeat in combat.

Like in Robert E. Lee, a leader who is killed or wounded in battle will be replaced by the next highest ranking leader under him. The game decides this primarily based on rank, thus if a brigade commander is killed and the regimental leaders under his command consist of three captains and a colonel, the game will pick the colonel to replace him. If a unit structure contains multiple leaders of the same rank, the game picks the leader from the unit with the lowest ID number. Each unit may also have a pool of up to four replacement leaders, which if present will be drawn upon instead of leaders from the commands underneath. Regimental leaders, if none are available in their replacement pool, are replaced by an unattached leader of the same rank or below. The game engine will create generic leaders if no unattached ones exist, however they will have very low ratings.

Civil War Generals 2 introduced victory hexes; these are preset locations on the map which will give extra victory points to whichever side controls them. In addition, a hex which has been fought over several times will turn into a victory hex. The value of a victory hex increases each time it is fought over or changes hands. Conversely, a victory hex that is not fought over or changes hands gradually loses points and may eventually disappear.

Unit strength ratings on the map were expanded to show what percentage of the unit's original strength had been killed or wounded in battle as well as the number of unwounded men who had fallen out of the ranks from combat action or marching. Resting a unit causes unwounded men to gradually return to the ranks. Units will suffer less straggling the higher the stats of the unit and/or its leader. A unit's morale decreases the more casualties it has suffered in battle.

The included scenarios and campaigns in the game were expanded from Robert E. Lee to include a significantly expanded Eastern Theater, as well as the major battles of the Western Theater. Some major battles and campaigns of the war, including post-Wilderness actions in the Eastern Theater, were left out due to time constraints on the game's development, however, the included scenario editor allows the player to recreate these battles himself.

An August 1998 patch fixed several problems with the original release of the game, including a bug which made it impossible for division commanders to be killed (the brigade commander underneath them would be killed instead).

== Development ==
Following the commercial success of Robert E. Lee: Civil War General, developer Impressions Games began to create a sequel, initially under the working title Civil War Generals. The first game had been designed by Jeffrey Fiske, but he was replaced as lead designer on Civil War Generals 2 by Doug Gonya, the scenario designer of the first game. Steve Grammont, the quality assurance lead on Civil War General, was promoted to a producer role on Civil War Generals 2. He later described his surprise at this promotion.

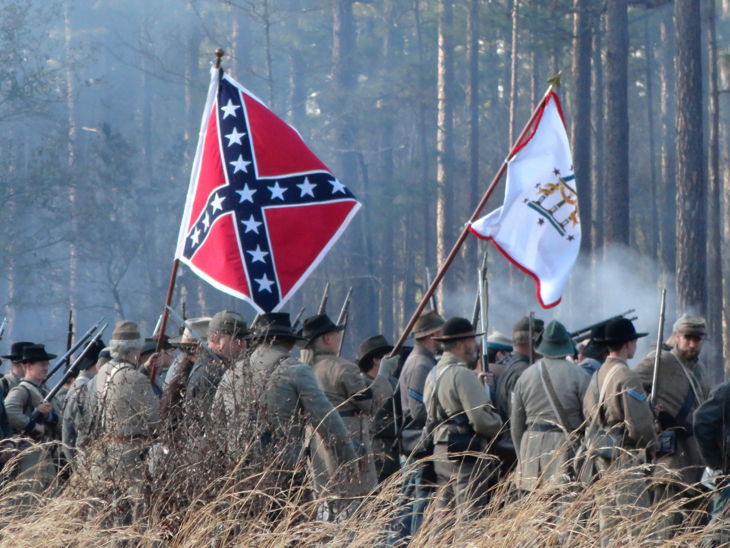
As with its predecessor, Civil War Generals 2 features footage of American Civil War reenactors.

Impressions based the design of Civil War Generals 2 on player feedback from its predecessor, combined with original ideas from the Impressions team. Scott Udell of Computer Games Strategy Plus noted that players had disliked the first game's short campaign and lack of clear victory conditions, and that Impressions sought to address these concerns in Civil War Generals 2. As in the first game, the team included paintings by Mort Künstler and worked with documentarian Jay Wertz to obtain video footage. In June 1997, an in-development version of the game was shown at the Electronic Entertainment Expo (E3).

Late in development, Impressions was pressured by its publisher Sierra On-Line to redesign Civil War Generals 2 as a real-time strategy game, according to Grammont. The publisher hoped to capitalize on the genre's recent popularity, and Sierra founder Ken Williams personally visited Impressions to push for the new direction. Grammont later explained that he confronted Williams in a meeting and "told him he was wrong" about the design. Afterward, Sierra allowed Impressions to complete Civil War Generals 2 as planned.

Originally slated for a fall 1997 release, the game launched on October 20 of that year with an estimated price of $49. To promote the release, Sierra and Computer Gaming World partnered to create the "Ultimate Civil War" contest. The winners would be sent to an American Civil War reenactment, and would have photographs of themselves in Impressions' next wargame.

== Reception ==
=== Sales ===
According to Grammont, Civil War Generals 2 was a commercial success and surpassed sales expectations at Sierra by "a lot". The game's Ultimate Civil War Collection bundle, which contained its predecessor, rose from 58th place in June 1998 to #7 in July on NPD SofTrends' reference software sales charts. In the United States, Civil War Generals 2 took fourth place on PC Data's weekly computer game sales rankings for September 27–October 3, 1998. Claiming fifth and sixth the following two weeks, respectively, it ultimately took 12th for October 1998 as a whole. Its average retail price for the month was $29. As of January 1999, Civil War Generals 2 and its predecessor together had sold more than 700,000 copies globally. PC Gamer US summarized the Civil War Generals series as "very successful" at the time.

=== Critical reviews ===
Reception

Review scores
Publication	Score
Computer Gaming World	2/5
PC Gamer (US)	86%
PC Zone	63/100
Computer Games Strategy Plus	4/5
PC Magazine	4/5

In PC Gamer US, Keith Sullivan praised Civil War Generals 2's scope, gameplay, accessibility and campaign continuity system. However, he called the visuals average and the artificial intelligence (AI) "barely adequate", and found the game's music annoying. He concluded that Civil War Generals 2 is "not the be all and end all of Civil War games for the hard-core wargamer", but that it is "a good, competent offering" for other players. Conversely, Jim Cobb of Computer Gaming World summarized the game as a step down for the series. He lambasted its "completely broken combat system and [...] dated game engine", which he felt ruined the achievements of the game's campaign and morale systems. Cobb particularly criticized Civil War Generals 2 for historical inaccuracies that make it "impossible to win [...] using historically authentic tactics."

PC Magazine's Bertrand C. Emmett wrote that he "relished playing Civil War Generals 2." He praised the game's audiovisuals and multimedia encyclopedia, and summarized the overall product as "engaging". Reviewing the game for Computer Games Strategy Plus, Jim Pedicord enjoyed the expanded scope and more complex rules compared to Civil War General, and called Civil War Generals 2 "the game the original should have been." He singled out the addition of zones of control and victory hexes for praise, and found the AI to be improved. Pedicord concluded that Civil War Generals 2, while "a little on the weak side" for experts of the genre, "should appeal to most wargamers".

== Legacy ==
After the completion of Civil War Generals 2, Grammont left Impressions Games and joined designer Charles Moylan at Big Time Software, where the two created the influential wargame Combat Mission: Beyond Overlord. Grammont and Moylan founded Battlefront.com in the late 1990s to publish Combat Mission, its sequels and other wargames.

A sequel to Civil War Generals 2, entitled Civil War Generals 3, was announced by Impressions and Sierra in January 1999. It was set for release in fall of that year, and was designed by Jeffrey Fiske of the original Civil War General and Steve Serafino of Lords of Magic. Civil War Generals 3 took place in the first year of the American Civil War, and would have tasked the player with establishing and maintaining a war economy. It was planned to feature empire-building and management game mechanics, played via a turn-based "simultaneous execution" gameplay structure. Combat would have taken place in real-time, although a simpler "quick battle" system was planned for novices. Victory could have been achieved through military, economic or other means. The game was announced alongside Pharaoh; at the time, Sierra's Jim Veevaert said that the two games would "be big hits for us this year."

In April 2000, Impressions announced that Civil War Generals 3 had been cancelled. According to James Fudge of Computer Games Strategy Plus, the main reason for the decision was low sales projections: the game was expected to sell "barely enough to cover development costs of the title." Despite the game's cancellation, the Impressions team clarified that they were interested in developing more wargames in the future.
