= Universe 3 =

Universe 3 may refer to:

- Universe 3 (Carr anthology), a 1973 science-fiction anthology edited by Terry Carr
- Universe 3 (Silverberg anthology), a 1994 anthology of science fiction short stories edited by Robert Silverberg and Karen Haber
- Universe 3 (video game), a 1989 video game
- Dance Dance Revolution Universe 3, a 2008 video game
