= Paladin II =

1992 video game

- Amiga cover art
- Developer: Omnitrend Software
- Publisher: Impressions Games
- Series: Paladin
- Platforms: Amiga, MS-DOS, Atari ST
- Release: EU: 1992
- Mode: Single-player

Paladin II is a video game developed by Omnitrend Software and published by Impressions Games in 1992 for MS-DOS, Amiga, and Atari ST.

== Plot ==
Paladin II is a strategy fantasy adventure game that features a point-and-drag interface. The game allows a player to import characters from Breach. The game features scenarios ranging from easy to very hard, and comes with an editor that allows a player to create new scenarios.

== Reception ==
The game was reviewed in 1993 in Dragon #193 by Hartley, Patricia, and Kirk Lesser in "The Role of Computers" column. The reviewers gave the game 2 out of 5 stars.
