= Gabriel Girard =

Gabriel Girard may refer to:

- Gabriel Girard (priest) (1677–1748), French grammarian and Roman Catholic priest
- Gabriel Girard (politician) (born 1935), French Canadian politician
