= Rules of Engagement (video game) =

1991 video game

- Developer: Omnitrend Software
- Publisher: Omnitrend Software
- Platforms: Amiga, MS-DOS
- Release: 1991

Rules of Engagement is video game published in 1990 by Omnitrend Software for Amiga and MS-DOS.

== Gameplay ==
Rules of Engagement is a game of tactical starship combat in which players control a flagship and give orders to ships of its fleet. If Breach 2 is available, tactical combat occurs in that game during six of Rules's 21 scenarios.

== Reception ==
Charles A. Smith reviewed the game for Computer Gaming World in 1991, stating that "For this reviewer, Rules of Engagement is elegant. There are no gee-whiz 256-color images. Instead, graphic designer Maurice Molyneaux and programmer Thomas Carbone opted for austerity and functionality to transform one's machine into a computer with deadly potential fitting snugly into the game's fiction". Scott May of Compute! in 1992 described it as a "strategic game of extraordinary breadth and challenge", praising the manual's clarity "considering the magnitude of its subject". While regretting the lack of VGA graphics, he concluded that "Rules of Engagement pens a bold new chapter in the future of role-playing games".

== Legacy ==
In 1993 there was a sequel published by Impressions Inc. titled Rules of Engagement 2.
