= Breach 2 =

1990 video game

- Cover art
- Developer: Omnitrend Software
- Publisher: Impressions Games
- Designer: Thomas Carbone
- Artist: Maurice Molyneaux
- Writer: Thomas Carbone
- Composer: Bruce MacPherson
- Platforms: Amiga, Atari ST, MS-DOS
- Release: WW: 1990
- Genre: Tactical role-playing
- Mode: Single-player

Breach 2 is a science fiction strategy video game developed by Omnitrend Software in 1990 for the Amiga, Atari ST and MS-DOS. It is the sequel to the 1987 game Breach, and was itself followed by Breach 3 in 1995. The game is set in the universe of Omnitrend's Universe and Rules of Engagement, and is compatible with both Rules of Engagement games.

In 1991, an updated version titled Breach 2 Enhanced was released for the Amiga. This version contains new graphics and a level editor.

== Story ==
Breach 2 is a game in which the player controls a squad in the interstellar Federated Worlds Special Forces, and the squad leader commands space marines to succeed in different scenarios. If the squad leader is killed in a scenario, the player loses that scenario and is returned to the main menu. The player is in control of every action that the squad leader and each marine takes.

== Gameplay ==
The game features some gameplay-system improvements over the original Breach, such as of all allowing diagonal movement and setting a path (instead of moving the units step-by-step), as well as improved visuals and sound. Additions include new weapons-of-war (such as smoke grenades, neutron bombs, camouflage suits, proximity charges and foxhole-makers) and enemies.

It also features a diagonally looking graphic tile set in a classic 2d space. The graphics makes it difficult to understand what actions can be performed. The fake isomerical view was dropped in the subsequent installment of the game Breach 3.

If Rules of Engagement is available, that game shifts to tactical combat in Breach 2 during several of the former's scenarios.

== Reception ==
Computer Gaming World in 1990 described the game as more of an updated version of the first Breach than a true sequel, but with welcome improvements such as diagonal movement and end of permanent death. It concluded that those who enjoyed the original would welcome the new game. In a 1992 survey of science fiction games the magazine gave the title four stars out of five, stating that it was "Easy to learn and fun to play" with the scenario editor and downloadable scenarios making it a "continuing 'fresh' product", and a 1994 survey of strategic space games set in the year 2000 and later gave the game three stars. The game received 4 out of 5 stars (PC) and 4½ stars (Amiga) in Dragon.

Jim Trunzo reviewed Breach 2 in White Wolf #21 (June/July 1990), rating it a 4 out of 5 and stated that "Breach 2 is enjoyable for many reasons. Many of the scenarios are short and can be played in as little as 30 minutes, making them just right for that gaming pause needed between spreadsheet and databasing work. The graphics are well-rendered and there are enough individual options to allow for numerous approaches to a scenario's objective."
