= Minnesota Paper Form Board Test =

- Purpose: tests imagery capacity

Minnesota Paper Form Board Test is said to test "imagery capacity" , “spatial visualization”,"mental visualization skills" "part–whole relationship skills" and "the ability of an individual to visualize and manipulate objects in space". The test consists of five figures and one of the figures displayed in disarranged parts. The subject has to decide which of the figures displays the pieces joined.
