= Discovery: In the Steps of Columbus =

1992 video game

- Developer(s): Impressions Games
- Publisher(s): Impressions Games
- Platform(s): Amiga, Atari ST, MS-DOS
- Release: 1992
- Mode(s): Strategy

Discovery: In the Steps of Columbus is a video game developed by Impressions Games and published in 1992 for Amiga, Atari ST, and MS-DOS compatible operating systems.

== Plot ==
Discovery: In the Steps of Columbus is a historical simulation involving discovery and conquest, and exploring the world with ships. Once safe landfall in new lands is found, the player builds ports and tries to help the settlers survive natural disasters and attacks by native peoples, so that they clear the land and explore as they build permanent settlements. The player competes against computer opponents who represent other countries and build their own empires, which results in confrontations.

== Reception ==
The game was reviewed in 1993 in Dragon #191 by Hartley, Patricia, and Kirk Lesser in "The Role of Computers" column. The reviewers gave the game 3 out of 5 stars. In a 1993 survey of pre-20th century wargames, Computer Gaming World <gave Discovery two stars out of five, calling it "slow, dull, user-unfriendly".
