= Warriors of Releyne =

1992 video game

- Cover art
- Developer(s): Impressions Games
- Publisher(s): Impressions Games
- Platform(s): Amiga, Atari ST
- Release: May 1992
- Genre(s): Real-time strategy
- Mode(s): Single-player

Warriors of Releyne is a 1992 strategy video game, developed and published by Impressions Games for the Amiga and Atari ST.

== Gameplay ==
Warriors of Releyne has the player control a party of heroes in the land of Dharak taking on orcs, trolls, and goblins led by an evil leader.

== Development ==
Warriors of Releyne was developed and published by Impressions Games for the Amiga and Atari ST. It was released in May 1992.

== Reception ==
Reception

Review scores
Publication	Score
Amiga Action	64%
Amiga Format	59%
Pelit	40/100

Warriors of Releyne received mediocre to poor reviews from critics.
