= Breach 3 =

1995 video game

- Developer: Impressions Games
- Publisher: Sierra On-Line
- Platform: MS-DOS
- Release: 1995
- Genre: Real-time tactics
- Mode: Single-player

Breach 3 is a 1995 real-time tactics video game developed by Impressions Games and published by Sierra On-Line. It is the sequel to Breach and Breach 2.

== Gameplay ==
Breach 3 is a real-time tactics game, in which the player navigates an armed squad through discrete missions. It follows a pausable real-time structure, and has been compared to titles such as Jagged Alliance and UFO: Enemy Unknown.

== Reception ==
Reception

Review scores
Publication	Score
PC Gamer (US)	77%
Computer Game Review	84/80/77
PC Entertainment	C−

Writing for PC Entertainment, Christopher Lindquist argued, "Breach 3's big problem is that the merc-gaming world has become much richer in the past couple of years, but Breach has not." Computer Game Review concurred that the game was out of date: the magazine concluded that Breach 3 "would've been awesome if it had been released on schedule." T. Liam McDonald of PC Gamer US was more positive. Although he agreed that "not enough has been done" to update the series to then-current standards, he found Breach 3 "an entertaining return to the days when this was groundbreaking gameplay."
