= When Two Worlds War =

1993 video game

- Developer: Impressions Games
- Publisher: Impressions Games
- Designer: Edward Grabowski
- Programmer: Edward Grabowski
- Composer: Christopher J. Denman
- Platforms: Amiga, MS-DOS
- Release: 1993
- Genre: Strategy

When Two Worlds War is a strategy video game developed and published by Impression Games. It was released in 1993 for Amiga and MS-DOS. The game simulates an interplanetary conflict.

== Reception ==
Amiga Format thought the game was neither simplistic nor shallow. Meanwhile, CU Amiga Magazine felt the game was identical to Utopia in every way, sans the fun.

Computer Gaming World's Martin Cirulis praised the packaging and the manuals, with the interface being described as "exceptionally clear and easy to use." However on the gameplay front, he felt that the game lacked personality, with "potential strengths... left unexplored." He also found the AI too easy to defeat, even at the highest level. Overall, he concluded that while the game was not bad, it fell short of its potential, comparing the game to getting Battlestar Galactica when Star Wars had been promised.
