= Universe (1983 video game) =

- Developer: Omnitrend Software
- Publisher: Omnitrend Software
- Designers: William G M Leslie III; Thomas Ralph Carbone
- Platforms: Atari 8-bit, Apple II, MS-DOS
- Release: 1983
- Genre: Space trading and combat
- Mode: Single-player

Universe (sometimes called Omnitrend's Universe) is a science fiction space trading and combat game by Omnitrend Software. It was created by William G M Leslie and Thomas R Carbone. The first version was programmed in valFORTH on an Atari 800, based on a board game created by Leslie. It was Omnitrend's first game.

== Gameplay ==
The game starts off on the planet Axia within the Local Group, a settlement that took place centuries ago thanks to the discovery of an alien hyperspace booster. This technology allowed the Local Group to be settled with supplies being sent from Earth using the booster. However, the supplies have stopped arriving and the player must now search for a second hyperspace booster that was reported in the area.

The game begins with a loan from the bank to finance a spaceship. Several models are available and offer different capabilities and cargo space. Once the ship is purchased and outfitted, the player then travels to different planets and engages in trading, mining, or piracy.

Universe is a very involving game, like requiring the player to calculate hyperjump coordinates for the navigation computer and calculate minimum orbits for planets in order to launch shuttles. The speed of the game tended to bog down when graphics were involved and when the game performed calculations involving orbital mechanics. On the Atari, having only one disk drive resulted in numerous disk swaps.

== Release ==
The game came on four disks and included in the US$89.95 cost was two free hours a month on the Universe BBS. Upon mailing in the included warranty card, users were also mailed subsequent versions of the game on replacement disks, based on suggestions from the BBS. Computer Gaming World praised this dedication to customer service.

== Reception ==
Reception

Review score
Publication	Score
Computer Gaming World	3.5/5

St.Game in 1984 criticized Universe for the Atari's slow performance, stating that "a lethargic running speed and endless disk swaps make it very, very slow going ... slow graphics routines tediously draw pictures that have no bearing on the game". The magazine concluded that "The concept, imagination, and detail behind Universe are superb. Were it not for the slow speed, it would be a perfect game", but the slow speed made it unplayable. Computer Gaming World in 1984 published two reviews of Universe. One reviewer found it to be "an absorbing game, at least for another six months" given how easy it was to be lose sight of the original objective by either trading or piracy. He also praised the detailed documentation and backstory, and concluded that "this is a 'must have' game for those of you who are interested in complex simulations and role playing. The graphics are excellent, the game play is realistic, and the basic premise makes sense". The other reviewer similarly praised the game, concluding that it was "an excellent interactive space adventure with 3D graphics that will give you months of enjoyment and headaches". In a 1992 survey of science fiction games the magazine gave the title three of five stars, writing that it was "Still one of the early classics". A 1994 survey of strategic space games set in the year 2000 and later gave the game three-plus stars out of five. Jerry Pournelle in BYTE called Universe "the most complicated game I ever did see ... a lot of good planning in this game, and I'm impressed", but criticized the incomplete documentation and user interface.

== Legacy ==
The game spawned two sequels on the Atari ST and other platforms, Universe II (1986) which was broadly similar and took place 20 years after the events in the first game, and Universe III (1989) which used the original games backstory but was an adventure game.

In 2026, Omnitrend Software, Inc. released its first new build in 40 years... version 1.5 and made it available on gog.com. It included a few bug fixes and an entirely restored manual.
