= Front Lines =

1994 wargame video game

- Developer: Impressions Games
- Publisher: Impressions Games
- Platform: MS-DOS
- Release: November 1994
- Genres: Turn-based strategy, computer wargame
- Modes: Single-player, multiplayer

Front Lines is a 1994 turn-based strategy computer wargame for MS-DOS developed and published by Impressions Games.

== Gameplay ==
Front Lines is a computer wargame with a turn-based system for gameplay, using vehicles.

== Development and release ==
Front Lines was developed by British studio Impressions Games. It was their first hex map strategy game and, according to the company's James Hunter, was created out of the team's desire to improve upon what they considered simplistic graphics seen in other genre examples including Battle Isle 2200 and History Line: 1914–1918. Hunter stated that having Front Lines set only a few decades ahead was because "it's far enough into the future to have some things a little bit different, but not so far that everything has become unrecognisable." He further explained, "It gives the artist a bit of scope to put imagination into it, because everybody knows what a tank looks like at the present time; and it gives us a few more scenarios as well."

Impressions first released Front Lines on PC in November 1994. Shorty ahead of this, an Amiga port was announced with Daze Marketing set to published it the following February. It was programmed by Andrew Prime, who had handled six of Impressions' previous Amiga conversions. Memory was the largest barrier to this process as Front Lines used 4 MBs of RAM on PC while the Amiga 600 and Amiga 1200 only had 1 MB and 2 MB respectively. Prime wanted to maintain 8-bit color but stated they would have likely lowered the display resolution or implemented a zoomed-in mode for better detail. The restricted memory also meant the title animations would not have been used. The release was reportedly pushed to March and then to June 1995. A CD-ROM edition became available in the interim, containing 13 more pre-built scenarios, digitized voices, and longer, more detailed cutscenes. By the fall, Impressions had been acquired by the more PC-oriented Sierra On-Line and the Front Lines Amiga version was quietly cancelled.

== Reception ==
Reception

Review scores
Publication	Score
Computer Gaming World	2.5/5
Joystick	82.5%
Next Generation	2/5
PC Gamer (US)	80%
PC Games (DE)	56%
Electronic Entertainment	4.5/5
PC Games (UK)	82%
PC Joker	72.5%
PC Player	47%
PC Team	81%
Play Time	49%
Power Play	61%
Score	6/10
Secret Service	74%

In PC Gamer US, William R. Trotter called Front Lines "a well-designed product that should have wide appeal." Next Generation’s reviewer was negative toward the game, and stated that "[m]ost fans of war games will find Front Lines a good example of the genre (if a little predictable), but everyone else's eyes will surely glaze over after a few minutes of play."

== Legacy ==
Following the completion of Front Lines, Impressions Games began work on a remake focused on the American Civil War. The team drifted away from this concept as development progressed. The project became Robert E. Lee: Civil War General. Impressions' Jeffrey Fiske later called Front Lines "a high-quality graphics program which, if it had done a little more time in development, would have had much better gameplay."
