= PowerHouse (video game) =

1995 video game

- Developer: Edward Grabowski Communications
- Publisher: Impressions Games
- Designers: Edward Grabowski; David Lester; Chris Foster
- Platform: Windows
- Release: 1995
- Genre: Business simulation
- Mode: Single-player

PowerHouse is a business simulation game developed by Edward Grabowski Communications and published by Impressions for Windows.

== Gameplay ==
PowerHouse is a simulation in which the player runs a power utility, and must compete to be the first to establish a regional electrical infrastructure.

== Development and release ==
PowerHouse was developed by designers Edward Grabowski, David Lester, and Chris Foster for UK publisher Impressions Games. The trio wished to "recapture the fun" of older oil tycoon simulation games and enhance them with new features. Another inspiration was the real-world effort to finding a solution to a looming energy crisis caused by increasing electricity consumption. Data on worldwide population growth and per capita energy use, as well as costs and industry revenue streams, was used for the gameplay model to establish an "open economic game with more than a touch of realism." While the team's previous game Air Bucks offered large flexibility in micromanaging a business, they wanted to simply this in PowerHouse, emphasizing, "We make games, not spreadsheets with graphics." They simultaneously wanted the player to make decisions based on sensible facts from feedback and information supply like in another previous title, Lords of the Realm.

Super VGA was chosen for the graphics to allow for crisper graphics than most strategy games of the era. Impressions had previously avoided creating games for Windows due to the graphics overhead causing significant slowdown. However, the WinG interface allowed them to bypass the problem, making PowerHouse their first Windows product. The increased memory of the CD-ROM format allowed for extensive photographs, full-motion video, and digitized voice-acting. The designers stated, "Additional video sequences will provide glimpses into the cutthroat, corporate world of the future, providing a vivid backdrop for the game that takes its cues from both cyberpunk fiction and the RoboCop films." Development on the game wrapped in May 1995. Impressions published it later that year. A version of the game for Amiga computers was previewed but never released.

== Reception ==
Reception

Review scores
Publication	Score
Computer Game Review	77/100
Computer Gaming World	2/5
Hyper	75/100
Next Generation	4/5
PC Gamer (US)	80%
PC Games (DE)	82%

Next Generation rated the game four stars out of five, and stated that "Looking at the mind-boggling array of charts and graphs in the game will provide some answers, but when all is said and done, making those decisions is up to you, and that's where the real fun in this economic simulation lies." Noting the game's steep learning curve, Computer Game Review concluded, "Strategy gamers should get a charge from it, others might get shocked."
