= Ultimate Soccer Manager =

Video game series

Ultimate Soccer Manager (USM) is an association football management video game series for MS-DOS, Amiga, and Windows 95, produced by Impressions and distributed by Sierra from 1995 to 1999. The game was a hit in Europe (except in Germany, where it was worse received due to some similarities with managers produced by local software houses such as Software 2000 and Ascaron), although it gained little support in Japan.

The series was noted for its micromanagement, where the player had to do the job of the team manager and much of that of the chairman, from player training up to bank balance management. Other well-known features were to bung an opposing team for preferential market treatment, rig or betting on the outcome of the players' team matches. Interviews after the match where some answers were printed with different interpretations on the next days' newspaper (the player could reply a question about the game with "It was a game of two halves", and "He amazed us after the game by giving us an insight into the rules of football" would be printed on the newspapers).

In all three games, the game always kept the same visual style: the main screen is a bird's eye view of the stadium facility (where clicking on the grass brings the squad selection screen or in the stands for the stadium builder) and all screens are presented like the player was inside an office (TCM 2004 used a similar interface option). To increase the feeling of "being there", tables are accessed via teletext, news from a newspaper and fixtures are available by clicking on a sheet attached to a clipboard.

== Ultimate Soccer Manager ==
The original version of the game provided the English football league system from the FA Premier League down to the Football Conference. It was distributed as shareware, with a fully functional demo in which the player could only select then–Second Division side Brighton and Hove Albion. The game allowed to watch games in top-down view, buy and sell players, manage the team, upgrade the stadium and manage commercial interests such as advertising and merchandise.

The game received a rating of 83% from Amiga computing. The review stating the game's graphic approach and coverage of business issues made it stand out in the crowded football management simulation market. The graphics the game used for actual matches, however, were considered poor. PC Format magazine gave the PC version of the game an 85% and a "silver award," claiming the game was "user-friendly and original" and said it was the "best [football management] game yet," while Amiga Format also gave the game an 85%.

In 1996, a data disk for the Amiga version was released, covering the 1995–1996 season.

== Ultimate Soccer Manager 2 ==
The second version of the game, USM 2 ran in protected mode, featured a more polished interface (plus teams and players of the 1996-1997 season and also the French and German leagues (although in the latter the final name of the players had a letter swapped to avoid legal problems regarding licensing) which could be accessed with different executables. In Germany, a localized version of the game was released under the name DSF Fussball Manager, DSF being a German TV sports channel.

== Ultimate Soccer Manager 98 ==
This version of the game was updated to run natively on Windows 95 and Windows 98 and included teams, players and statistics from the 1997–1998 season. The number of leagues increased to five, as both Italian and Scottish championships were added. Transfers required often a week or more of fax exchange between clubs and with the player agent, making the game more realistic than most other games in this aspect, which only required the player to bid for the player and agree on wage and length, adding him instantaneously to the team. USM 98 was released as DSF Fussball Manager 98 for the German market.

An update disk (also available as a stand-alone) named Ultimate Soccer Manager 98-99 Season Update Add-on was sold shortly after the game came out with statistics for the 1998-1999 season, which also included both Spanish and Dutch top two divisions, increasing the number to seven playable leagues. While several bugs were resolved (such as a giving one of the assistants a wage of £99,999,999, and then after offering him a new contract he would start paying the club around £13M weekly, a glitch that carried from USM 2), it became clear that many teams would allow their superstar players to end contract, allowing the player to pick them for free (although with a large salary). Similarly, you could loan a big-name player worth millions and then use him as a makeweight in transfer deals.

A 1999 update was released, which received a score of 79 from French review magazine Joystick.

== USM 2000 ==
There was a planned 2000 version of the game, which was developed. However, the game was thought to be scrapped after Sierra UK became impatient with the game's development progress. The game was set to have an "all-new 3D match engine with advanced Artificial Intelligence".

== Updates (2012–present) ==
The "Ultimate Soccer Manager Update" was released by the community to produce revised player and team data for the 2012–13 season. A further update was released for the 2017–18 season and introduced up-to-date sponsors and advertisers to the game.

A community of developers and gamers also discovered the presence of a hidden cheat menu. They release a small application named USM Tweaker allowing to alter some behaviours in the game, like preventing managers from being fired or pausing the transfer of players.
