= Picture dictionary =

Dictionary with illustrated definitions

A picture dictionary or pictorial dictionary is a dictionary where the definition of a word is displayed in the form of a drawing or photograph. Picture dictionaries are useful in a variety of teaching environments, such as teaching a young child about their native language, or instructing older students in a foreign language, such as in the Culturally Authentic Pictorial Lexicon. Picture dictionaries are often organized by topic instead of being an alphabetic list of words, and almost always include only a small corpus of words.

A similar but distinct concept is the visual dictionary, which is composed of a series of large, labelled images, allowing the user to find the name of a specific component of a larger object.

== Benefits and Advantages ==
Picture dictionaries offer numerous benefits, particularly in educational settings. They enhance visual learning, which can significantly improve comprehension and retention of new vocabulary. Visual aids can make learning more engaging and can help learners of all ages, especially young children and visual learners, grasp the meaning of words more effectively.

Studies have shown that visual learning aids can lead to better memory recall and understanding of complex concepts. Visuals help encode information in both the verbal and visual parts of the brain, making it easier to retrieve later. Additionally, research indicates that visuals can improve learning by up to 400% compared to text alone.

== See also ==
- Knowledge visualization
- Visual dictionary
- Visual thinking
