= Graphical perception =

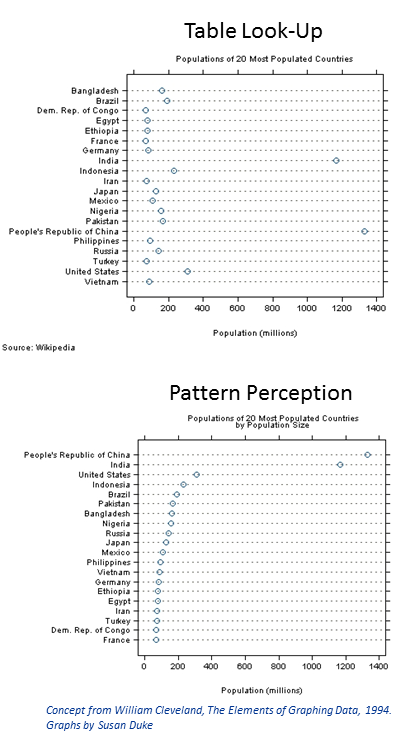

Graphical perception is the human capacity for visually interpreting information on graphs and charts. Both quantitative and qualitative information can be said to be encoded into the image, and the human capacity to interpret it is sometimes called decoding. The importance of human graphical perception, what we discern easily versus what our brains have more difficulty decoding, is fundamental to good statistical graphics design, where clarity, transparency, accuracy and precision in data display and interpretation are essential for understanding the translation of data in a graph to clarify and interpret the science.

Graphical perception is achieved in dimensions or steps of discernment by:

- detection : recognition of geometry which encodes physical values
- assembly : grouping of detected symbol elements; discerning overall patterns in data
- estimation : assessment of relative magnitudes of two physical values.

Cleveland and McGill's experiments to elucidate the graphical elements humans detect most accurately is a fundamental component of good statistical graphics design principles. In practical terms, graphs displaying relative position on a common scale most accurately are most effective. A graph type that utilizes this element is the dot plot. Conversely, angles are perceived with less accuracy; an example is the pie chart. Humans do not naturally order color hues. Only a limited number of hues can be discriminated in one graphic.

Graphic designs that utilize visual pre-attentive processing in the graph design's assembly is why a picture can be worth a thousand words by using the brain's ability to perceive patterns. Not all graphs are designed to consider pre-attentive processing. For example in the attached figure, a graphic design feature, table look-up, requires the brain to work harder and take longer to decode than if the graph utilizes our ability to discern patterns.

Graphic design that readily answers the scientific questions of interest will include appropriate estimation. Details for choosing the appropriate graph type for continuous and categorical data and for grouping have been described. Graphics principles for accuracy, clarity and transparency have been detailed and key elements summarized.

== See also ==
- Spatial visualization ability
