= Mental Cutting Test =

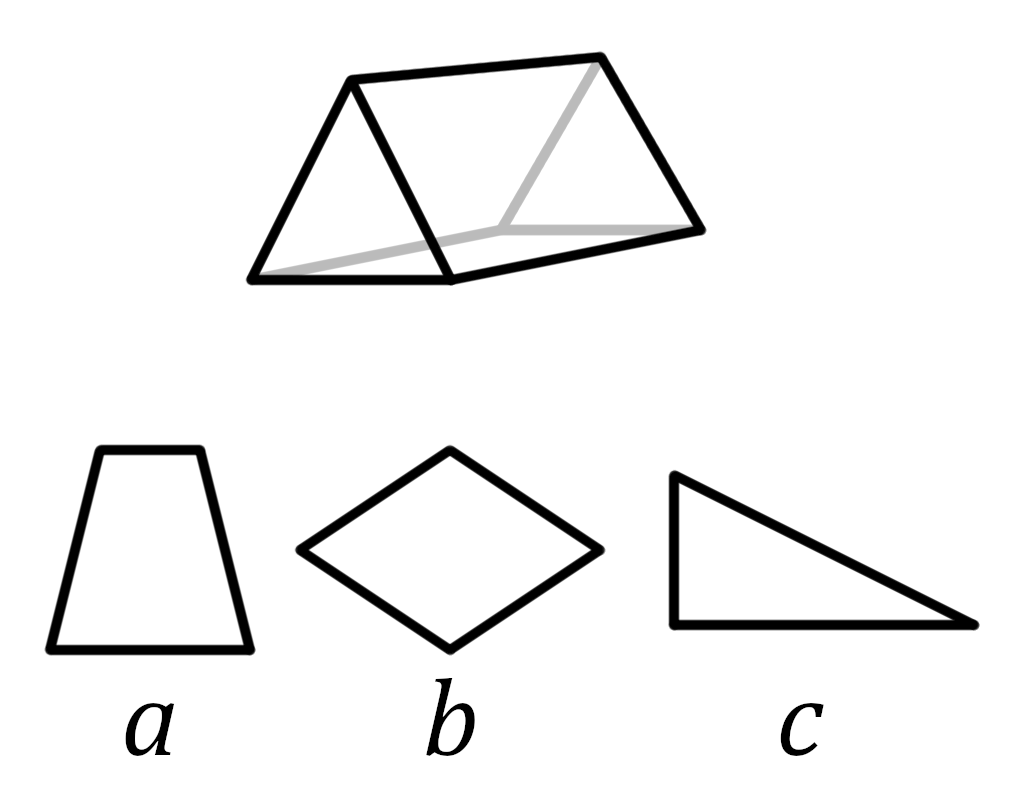
- Example Mental Cutting Test: which (if any) of these three 2D shapes can result from a single, plane cut across the prism at top?
- Purpose: measures visualization ability

The Mental Cutting Test is a measure of spatial visualization ability (MCT) (CEEB,1939) first developed for a university entrance examination in the USA.

The test consists of 25 items. For each problem on the exam, students are shown a criterion figure which is to be cut with an assumed plane. They must choose the correct resulting cross-section from among five alternatives. (MCT) (CEEB, 1939)
