= Casino De Luxe =

1995 gambling video game

- Developer: Impressions
- Publisher: Impressions
- Platform: Microsoft Windows
- Release: 1995
- Genre: Gambling simulation
- Mode: Single-player

Casino De Luxe is a video game developed and published by Impressions for the Microsoft Windows.

== Gameplay ==
Casino De Luxe includes a variety of casino games, such as slot machines, pai gow, Caribbean stud poker, video poker, craps, roulette, and blackjack.

== Development and release ==
Casino De Luxe was developed by Impressions Games, conceived by the company's founder David Lester, and released in 1995. Impressions was sold to Sierra On-Line shortly thereafter. Domestic re-releases and international distribution of the game would be published under the Sierra brand.

== Reception ==
Reception

Review scores
Publication	Score
Computer Game Review	85/100
Joystick	100/200
Next Generation	3/5
PC Gamer (US)	80%
Computer Gaming World (Spain)	2/5
Génération 4	59%
PC Joker	43%
PC Top Player	61/100

Casino De Luxe received mixed very reviews. Next Generation rated the game three stars out of five, and stated that "if you're into these games, this is the best one around." It received a largely positive review from Computer Game Review.
