= Global Domination =

1993 video game

- Developer: Impressions Games
- Publisher: Impressions Games
- Designers: Simon Bradbury; David Lester
- Platforms: Amiga, MS-DOS
- Release: 1993
- Genre: Turn-based strategy
- Modes: Single-player, multiplayer

Global Domination is a turn-based strategy video game developed and published by Impressions Games and released in 1993 for Amiga and MS-DOS. The game is based on the board game Risk with additional features: more territories, unit types which can be controlled in a mini-game, unit obsolescence, valuing regions higher or lower than others (for income), and the ability to fund intelligence operations.

== Gameplay ==
Like Risk, Global Domination is a turn-based game. Each game starts with the players being allocated a few random territories across the globe. The player would then be allocated a certain number of points to invest in purchasing units, researching technology or spending in intelligence operations. Players could then use their units to claim neutral or "brown" territories or to invade other player territories. Players would often have to be careful not to spread their forces too thin, lest they risk their territories revolting (or turning into "purple territories"). The game has four scenarios, set in 1914 (the year World War I broke out), 1939 (when World War II broke out in Europe), and 1995, as well as a fictional scenario set on a post-apocalyptic Earth in the year 2500, after an asteroid impact on the Pacific Ocean occurs in 2030.

When a player attacks or defends a territory, he/she can choose to either auto-resolve battles or micro-manage them. Micro-managing the battle results in a mini-game that simulates the battlefield where combat takes place.

Players could choose to challenge other humans or a selection of AI mostly based on famous world leaders. Each AI player had a different strategy and their competency and aggressiveness varied. Some of the AI players featured in the game include historical figures such as General Custer, Napoleon Bonaparte and Queen Victoria.

== Reception ==
Chuck Moss wrote in Computer Gaming World in February 1994 that Global Domination "is at once both a failure and a surprising success". He criticized the "clunky" tactical combat as "simply not up to current standards", but said that the strategic gameplay was "A simple, workmanlike, intermediate-level, conquer-the-world game that's surprisingly enjoyable and addictive ... a great solitaire game" with high replay value. Moss gave Global Domination "an unexpected thumbs up".
