= Reference software =

Software which emulates and expands upon print reference forms

Reference software is software which emulates and expands upon print reference forms including the dictionary, translation dictionary, encyclopaedia, thesaurus, and atlas. Like print references, reference software can either be general or specific to a domain, and often includes maps and illustrations, as well as bibliography and statistics. Reference software may include multimedia content including animations, audio, and video, which further illustrate a concept. Well designed reference software improves upon the navigability of print references, through the use of search functionality and hyperlinks.

== Origins and development ==
Many dictionaries and encyclopedias rushed into CD-ROM editions soon after the widespread introduction of the CD-ROM to home computers. A second major development occurred as the internet also became widely available in homes, with reference works becoming available online as well. The conversion of previously print-only reference materials to electronic format marked a major change to the marketing and accessibility of such works. A striking case study is that of the venerable Encyclopædia Britannica, which was previously only available at prices of USD 1500 and higher, restricting it to the better libraries and the wealthy. Today, the Encyclopædia Britannica and World Book Encyclopedia retail in electronic format for around 50 USD, with cheaper OEM versions sometimes bundled with new computers. Such dramatic changes brought conventionally restricted knowledge repositories to the fingertips of an almost universal audience in a period of less than 11 years.

The opportunities brought by new media enticed new competitors into the reference software market. One of the earliest and most well-known was Microsoft Encarta, first introduced on CD-ROM and then also moving online along with other major reference works. In the dictionaries market, one of the more prolific brands was Merriam-Webster, which released CD-ROM and then online versions of English dictionaries, thesauri and foreign language dictionaries.

Since 2010, reference materials have begun to appear as apps on Smartphones. In the field of English as a foreign or second language, this is seen as an interesting pedagogical development and is the subject of much discussion , as language learners increasingly abandon print dictionaries for online editions and apps like the one produced by Macmillan Education. A list of online dictionaries is maintained under "dictionaries".

Wikipedia and its spin-offs (such as Wiktionary) marked a new departure in educational reference software. Previous encyclopedias and dictionaries had compiled their contents based on invited and closed teams of specialists. The Wiki concept allowed anyone and everyone to join in creating and editing an online set of reference works.

== See also ==
- Encarta and other CD-ROM encyclopedias
- Comparison of reference management software
- Educational software
- Lists of encyclopedias
- List of online dictionaries
- List of online encyclopedias
