= Visuospatial ability =

Ability to mentally manipulate 2-dimensional and 3-dimensional figures

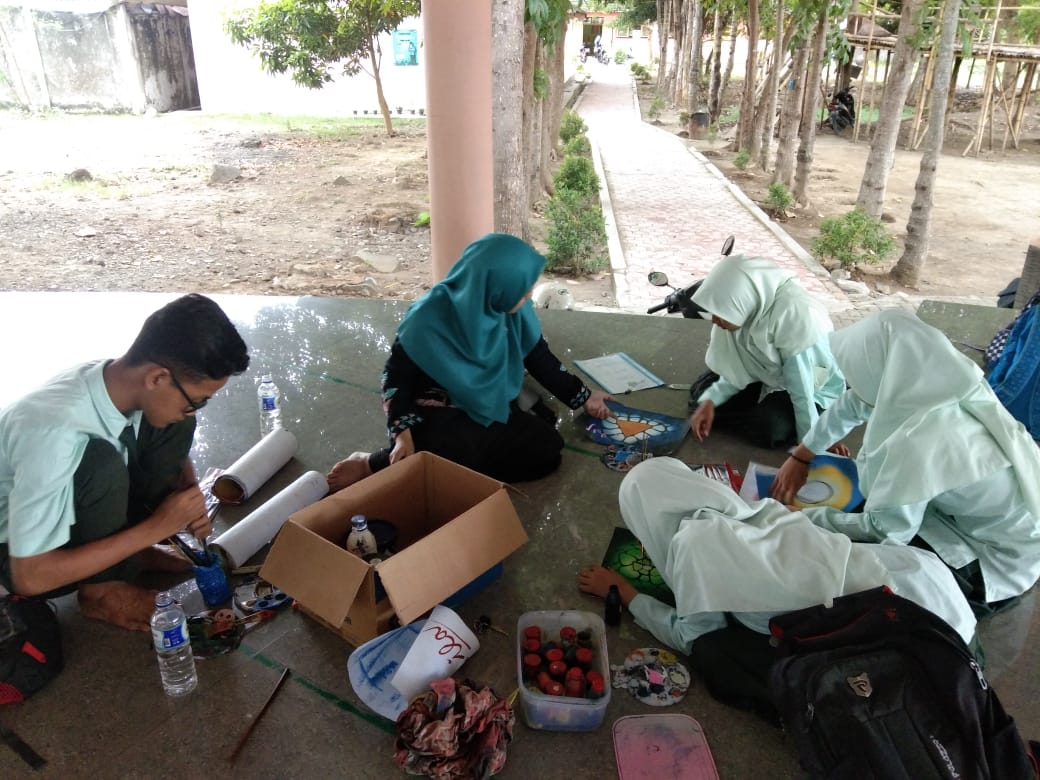
Children drawing 2D patterns on paper

Visuospatial ability or visual-spatial ability is the ability to mentally manipulate 2-dimensional and 3-dimensional figures. It is typically measured with simple cognitive tests and is predictive of user performance with some kinds of user interfaces. Visuospatial skills are needed for motor coordination (directed movement), depth and distance perception, and spatial navigation.

== Measurement ==
The cognitive tests used to measure visuospatial ability including mental rotation tasks like the Mental Rotations Test or mental cutting tasks like the Mental Cutting Test; and cognitive tests like the VZ-1 (Form Board), VZ-2 (Paper Folding), and VZ-3 (Surface Development) tests from the Kit of Factor-Reference cognitive tests produced by Educational Testing Service. Though the descriptions of spatial visualization and mental rotation sound similar, mental rotation is a particular task that can be accomplished using spatial visualization.

The Minnesota Paper Form Board Test involves giving participants a shape and a set of smaller shapes which they are then instructed to determine which combination of small shapes will fill the larger shape completely without overlapping. The Paper Folding test involves showing participants a sequence of folds in a piece of paper, through which a set of holes is then punched. The participants must choose which of a set of unfolded papers with holes corresponds to the one they have just seen.

The Surface Development test involves giving participants a flat shape with numbered sides and a three-dimensional shape with lettered sides and asking the participants to indicate which numbered side corresponds to which lettered side.

== History ==
The construct of visuospatial ability was first identified as separate from general intelligence in the 20th Century, and its implications for computer system design were identified in the 1980s.

In 1987, Kim Vicente and colleagues ran a battery of cognitive tests on a set of participants and then determined which cognitive abilities correlated with performance on a computerized information search task. They found that the only significant predictors of performance were vocabulary and spatial visualization ability, and that those with high spatial visualization ability were twice as fast to perform the task as those with lower levels of spatial visualization ability.

== Age differences ==
Older adults tend to perform worse on measures of spatial visualization ability than younger adults, and this effect seems to occur even among people who use spatial visualization frequently on the job, such as architects and surveyors (though they still perform better on the measures than others of the same age). It is, however, possible that the types of spatial visualization used by architects are not measured accurately by the tests.

== Gender differences ==
According to certain studies, men on average have one standard deviation higher spatial intelligence quotient than women. This domain is one of the few where clear sex differences in cognition appear. Researchers at the University of Toronto say that differences between men and women on some tasks that require spatial skills are largely eliminated after both groups play a video game for only a few hours. Although Herman Witkin had claimed women are more "visually dependent" than men, this has been disputed.

The gender difference in spatial ability was found to be attributed to morphological differences between male and female brains. The parietal lobe is a part of the brain that is recognized to be involved in spatial ability, especially in 2d- and 3d mental rotation. Researchers at the University of Iowa found that the thicker grey matter in the parietal lobe of females led to a disadvantage in mental rotations, and that the larger surface areas of the parietal lobe of males led to an advantage in mental rotations. The results found by the researches support the notion that gender differences in spatial abilities arose during human evolution such that both sexes cognitively and neurologically developed to behave adaptively. However, the effect of socialization and environment on the difference in spatial ability is still open for debate.

Other studies suggest gender differences in spatial thinking may be explained by a stereotype threat effect. The fear of fulfilling stereotypes negatively affects the performance which results in a self-fulfilling prophecy.

== See also ==
- Aphantasia
- Baddeley's model of working memory
- Graphical perception
- Nonverbal learning disorder (visual-spatial learning disorder)
- Proof without words
- Visual thinking
