= Air Bucks =

1992 video game

- Developer(s): Impressions Games
- Publisher(s): Sierra Entertainment
- Programmer(s): Edward Grabowski
- Artist(s): Erik Casey
- Platform(s): Amiga, Atari ST, MS-DOS
- Release: NA: 1992
- Genre(s): Business simulation
- Mode(s): Single-player, multiplayer

Air Bucks is a 1992 business simulation game developed by Impressions Games and published by Sierra Entertainment. The game involves managing an airline company.. In 1993 an enhanced version, Air Bucks v1.2, was released for the Amiga.

== Gameplay ==
The game begins in 1946, after the Second World War. Using default settings, the player controls the airline "Air Bucks" with three AI competitors; all are based in the city of Miami. Each player purchases landing rights for a surrounding airport not more than 1,000 miles away, as the only plane available at the beginning (the Douglas DC-3) has a range of 1,000 miles. Usually the first landing rights purchased are in either New York or Washington D.C. Aside from the initial base airport (Miami by default, but customizable) only two airlines can have landing rights to any one airport.

While waiting for landing rights to be awarded, which takes one month at the beginning of the game and two to three months later on, the player can acquire airplanes and adjust each plane's LOPA (layout of passenger accommodations) by altering the number of first class and coach seats.

Once landing rights are established the player creates a route between two or more cities, sets coach and first class ticket prices, and then assigns planes to the route. The ticket price and service amenities can be constantly adjusted until optimum revenue is generated.

As time progresses, new models of airplanes become available for purchase, such as the Douglas DC-6, Boeing 747, and Aérospatiale Concorde.

The game's demand model calculates passenger demand for each route based on ticket pricing, plane speed, size of destinations, plane age, service quality (as a function of employee wages), advertising spend, aircraft reliability (as a function of maintenance spend) and other factors. The game also simulates fuel price fluctuations based on historical inflation data, and periodically generates weather events and strikes which temporarily close particular airports.

The default computer companies are "Transglobal Inc", "International GT", and "Great Times". The number and selection of computer and human players is customizable, as are the company names and logos, starting site, and difficulty.

== Reception ==
Computer Gaming World gave Air Bucks a negative review. The magazine criticized the interface, version 1.0's slow game speed, and poor computer AI and economic model. In 1993 Impressions released version 1.2, advertising that it was a "New Air Bucks!" with "the features you want", including better VGA graphics, interface, computer AI, and economic model. The company ("Committed to customer satisfaction") offered the upgrade for free to registered owners of the game.

== Represented cities ==
Air Bucks represents 128 airport sites: 6 in Australia; 2 in New Zealand; 8 in the South Pacific; 25 in Asia; 7 in Africa; 33 in Europe; 1 in Greenland; 1 in Bermuda; 14 in Latin America; 5 in Canada; and 26 in the United States. While the game includes a number of small historical "technical stop" destinations such as Wake Island, Canton Island, Gander, the Azores, Shannon and Recife, some major cities such as Dubai, Casablanca, Tel Aviv and Brisbane are absent. There are also some minor spelling and geographical errors in the game; for example, sites include both "Fiji" (which appears to be closer to Nouméa, New Caledonia on the map) and "Nandi" (Nadi International Airport is actually the main airport on the main island of Fiji).

Since no more than two airlines can acquire landing rights to any one airport, competition is keen for large-market airports and, early in the game before airplanes have trans-oceanic range, for tech-stop airports.
