= Visual dictionary =

Dictionary that primarily uses pictures to illustrate the meaning of words

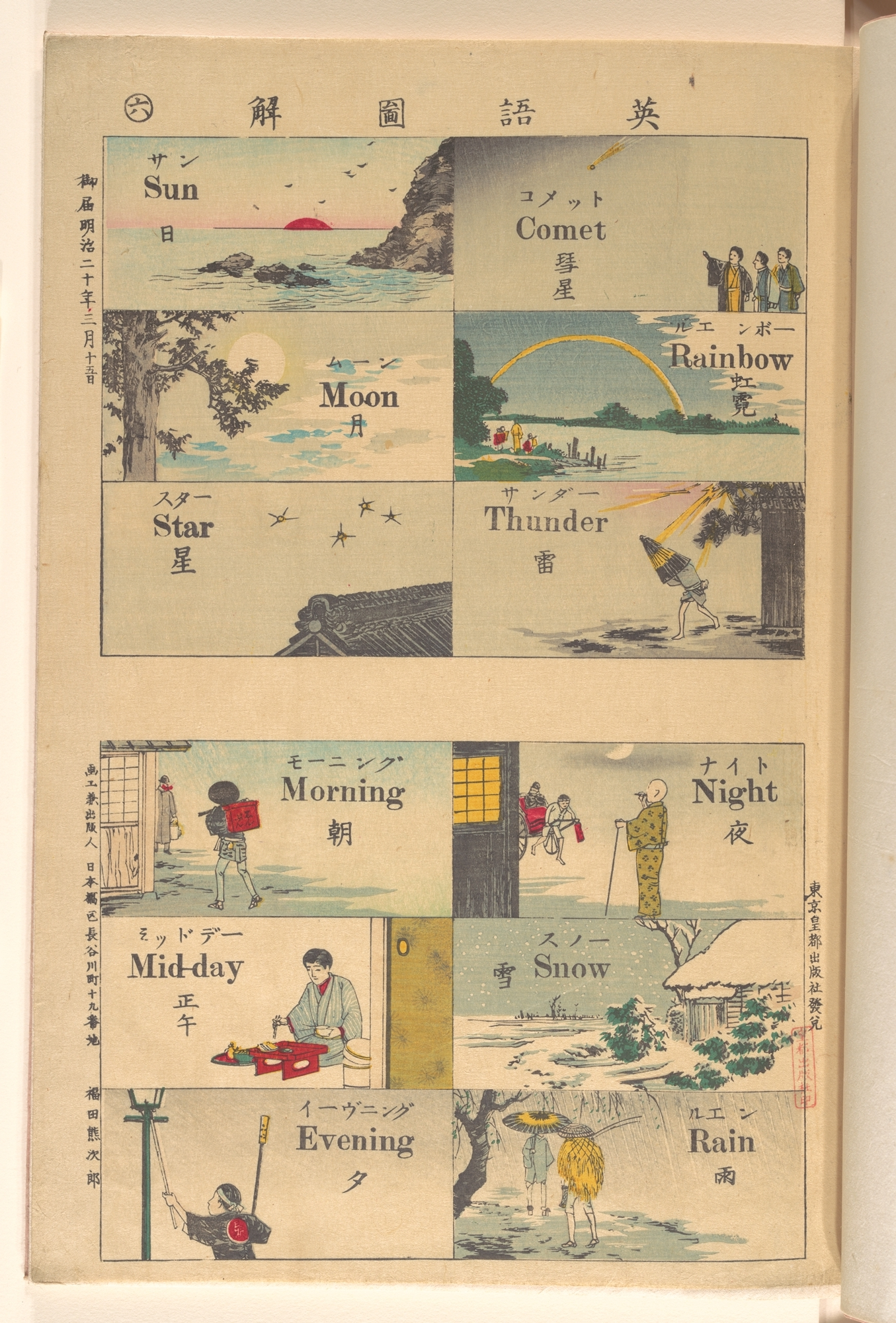
A Japanese visual dictionary (1887).

A visual dictionary is a dictionary that primarily uses pictures to illustrate the meaning of words. Visual dictionaries are often organized by themes, instead of being an alphabetical list of words. For each theme, an image is labeled with the correct word to identify each component of the item in question. Visual dictionaries can be monolingual or multilingual, providing the names of items in several languages. An index of all defined words is usually included to assist finding the correct illustration that defines the word.

Some international visual dictionary publishers include Oxford University Press and Dorling Kindersley.

== See also ==
- Picture dictionary
- Knowledge visualization
- Visual language
