= Impressions Games =

British video game developer

- Company type: Subsidiary
- Industry: Video games
- Founded: 1989; 37 years ago
- Founder: David Lester
- Defunct: February 2004
- Headquarters: Cambridge, Massachusetts, USA
- Products: City Building series Lords of the Realm series
- Parent: Sierra Entertainment (1995–2004)
- Website: impressionsgames.com (archived)

Impressions Games was a British video game developer founded by David Lester. He sold the company to Sierra On-Line in 1995, who was then bought out by Cendant and eventually, Vivendi Universal (now known as Vivendi SA).

Impressions specialized in historical strategy games and is best known for its City Building Series, which include Caesar, Pharaoh, Zeus: Master of Olympus, and Emperor: Rise of the Middle Kingdom. In 1998, Impressions Games was the most profitable division of Havas Interactive, with $20 million in net profit. This surpassed Blizzard Entertainment for the period, according to CNET Gamecenter.

Mike Ryder, former president of Sierra Entertainment, forced a change in management in October 2001, during development of Lords of the Realm III. Rod Nakamoto was installed as the new director. Lords III became Impressions's final game, and was released to mediocre reviews in March 2004.

The studio was shut down in April 2004 when Vivendi Universal closed most of its game development studios. Many members of the studio moved on to form Tilted Mill Entertainment.

Former notable employees of Impressions include Chris Beatrice and Peter Haffenreffer, co-founders of Tilted Mill Entertainment and Simon Bradbury, founder of Firefly Studios.

== Games developed ==
- Kenny Dalglish Soccer Match (1989)
- Charge of the Light Brigade (1991)
- Tornado Ground Attack (1991)
- Afrika Korps (1991)
- Fort Apache (1991)
- Great Napoleonic Battles (1991)
- Warriors of Releyne (1992)
- Air Bucks (1992)
  - Air Bucks v1.2 (1993)
- Air Force Commander (1992)
- Caesar (1992)
  - Caesar Deluxe (1993)
- Conquest of Japan (1992)
- Air Force Commander WWII (1993)
- Discovery: In the Steps of Columbus (1992)
- Global Domination (1993)
- The Blue & The Gray (1993)
- When Two Worlds War (1993)
- D-Day: The Beginning of the End (1994)
- Detroit (1994)
- Front Lines (1994)
- Lords of the Realm (1994)
- Caesar II (1995)
- Casino De Luxe (1995)
- High Seas Trader (1995)
- PowerHouse (1995)
- Ultimate Soccer Manager (1995)
  - Ultimate Soccer Manager Data Disk (1996)
- Lords of the Realm II (1996)
  - Lords of the Realm II: Siege Pack (1997)
- Robert E. Lee: Civil War General (1996)
- Space Bucks (1996)
- The Rise & Rule of Ancient Empires (1996)
- Ultimate Soccer Manager 2 (1996)
- Grant, Lee, Sherman: Civil War Generals 2 (1997)
- Lords of Magic (1997)
  - Lords of Magic: Legends of Urak (1998)
- Caesar III (1998)
- Ultimate Soccer Manager 98 (1998)
  - Ultimate Soccer Manager 98-99 Season Update Add-On (1998)
- Pharaoh (1999)
  - Cleopatra: Queen of the Nile (2000)
- Zeus: Master of Olympus (2000)
  - Poseidon: Master of Atlantis (2001)
- Emperor: Rise of the Middle Kingdom (2002)
- Lords of the Realm III (2004)

== Games published ==
- Emperor of the Mines (1989)
- Breach 2 (1990)
- Rorke's Drift (1990)
- The Final Conflict (1990)
  - Breach 2 Enhanced (1991)
- Cohort: Fighting for Rome (1991)
- Merchant Colony (1991)
- Crime City (1992)
- Paladin II (1992)
- Cohort II: Fighting for Rome (1993)
- Rules of Engagement 2 (1993)
- Breach 3 (1995)
