= Simon Power (composer) =

English composer (born 1958)

Simon Power (born 14 February 1958) is an English composer & sound designer, best known for his work on the BBC's Classic Novelisation range of Doctor Who audiobooks.

== Career ==
Between the late 1980s and mid-1990s, Power produced a number of tracks and remixes under a variety of names including Atomix, Marine Boy, Angel Deluxe. He had chart success as Powerhouse when "On the Floor" (Champion Records) reached no.80 in the official UK charts. The E.P. La Monde Marine (1990) became a much sought after cult release and the tracks "Laura, Laura" and "La Monde Marine" gained airplay on The John Peel Show and Kiss FM. During the mid-1990s he worked with Future Publishing's Future Music magazine, producing a series of cover mounted sample CDs called Bite Size Beats 'n' Samples and The Ultimate Sample Collection. From the mid 1990s to 2004, Power worked as an engineer and senior audio editor at BBC Audiobooks where he contributed to a number of BBC Audio releases including Father Ted, The Mighty Boosh and Little Britain.

As well as post production on a variety of Sci-Fi and fantasy audio releases (Doctor Who, Sarah Jane Adventures and Big Finish's Pathfinder Legends and Blake's 7 productions), Power has also produced music that features in radio and TV ads, games and feature films around the world under the pseudonyms Elliot Simons and Dream Valley Music. Games that feature his compositions include Pride & Prejudice & Zombies, Crimson: Steam Pirates, Yepi's Journey, Wacky Strike and Google Play's Red Ball 4. In 2016 he composed the music for the Audi A4 Quattro advertising campaign.

Between 2005 and 2008, Power produced over 50 short documentary films for music technology site, Sonic State. Also during this period, two of his short films won the Best Film award at Digital Arts Festivals in the UK. He is a prolific journalistic writer with articles published in Future Music, Music Technology and on Shockwave-Sound. In 2017 he recorded a series of tracks for release as an E.P. on Banco De Gaia's Disco Gecko record label. The E.P. La Monde Marine (1990) has been re-released by Craigie Knowes as a 30th anniversary vinyl edition with extra previously unheard tracks from the period 1990 - 1992.

== Doctor Who audiobooks ==
Since 2004 Power has been providing original compositions, spot FX and sound beds to accompany unabridged readings of the popular 1970s Doctor Who paperback novels released under the Target Imprint, voiced by actors who are closely associated with the television serial. Power's sound design transforms the readings to give the illusion of a full cast of characters, a process he describes as "The audio equivalent of a graphic novel...enhancing the narrative with a dramatic backdrop of sound...while keeping deference to the original story."

Power's unique style has been well received and is now often imitated. The fansite eyeofhorus.org, declared:

"Whether it’s atmospheric treatment to voices...the gulp of a soldier rehydrating himself...the lethal laser rifle blast...to the gentle womb-like hum of the TARDIS console room...Meonsound has once again excelled in recreating the seemingly impossible".

BBC Television's Doctor Who director Barry Letts commented on Power's contribution to Doctor Who & The Dæmons noting that "The music & FX work well because they are so precise in their dubbing."

Titles that include Simon Power's sound enhancement have been released regularly since 2004 under BBC Audiobooks & more recently as BBC Audio's AudioGo imprint. In 2010, some of the recordings were broadcast on BBC Radio 4 Extra and BBC iPlayer.

== Personal life ==
At the age of 13 Power became cartoonist for the South Wales Weekly Argus, his cartoon strip 'Karl' appearing on the front page of the newspaper between 1971 and 1975. Aged 20, he joined London's Capital Radio becoming Gary Crowley's sidekick on the groundbreaking 'Red Hot Club' evening show. He was a DJ on the Thames Pleasure Cruisers including a residency for many years on the ill fated Marchioness. He also performed a DJ set backstage at the 2017, 2019 & 2022 Glastonbury Festival.
