= Breach (1987 video game) =

Video game by Omnitrend Software

- Publisher(s): Omnitrend Software
- Platform(s): Amiga, Atari ST, Macintosh, DOS
- Release: 1987

Breach is a video game published in 1987 by Omnitrend Software. It was followed by Breach 2 in 1990 and Breach 3 in 1995.

== Release ==
A conversion for Sega Genesis featuring the gameplay-system improvements from the Amiga version of Breach 2 was in development by Treco but it was never released.

== Reception ==
Joseph S. McMaster reviewed the game for Computer Gaming World, and stated that "In spite of occasional problems with the documentation, Breach must be considered a top-notch game."

Harvey Bernstein for Antic approved of the powerful level editor but said that graphics were "nothing special". He concluded that "Hardcore wargamers will probably find Breach's variations on old themes intriguing, but for the rest of us this ST game just isn't much fun".

Keith Ferrell for Compute! stated "This game captures perfectly the feel of those hard-combat, high-tech science-fiction war stories."
