= Universe 3 (video game) =

1989 video game

- Developer: Omnitrend Software
- Publisher: Omnitrend Software
- Platforms: Amiga, Atari ST, MS-DOS
- Release: 1989
- Genre: Adventure

Universe 3 is an adventure video game published in 1989 by Omnitrend Software for MS-DOS, Atari ST, and Amiga. It was written by William Leslie and Thomas Carbone. Universe 3 follows Omintrend's Universe from 1983 and Universe II from 1986.

== Gameplay ==
Universe 3 is a game in which the player is the captain of a starship assigned to a diplomatic mission.

== Reception ==
Douglas Seacat reviewed the game for Computer Gaming World, and stated that "Frankly, Universe III is not as good as its most recent predecessors (Breach and Paladin). Where its predecessors demonstrated flexibility and depth, Universe III is rigid and narrow. Those who have played Universe and Universe II will want to play this game to continue the series and some Amiga and IBM owners will want to play the game as a diversion. Nevertheless, one cannot help but have the feeling that Universe III is not what Omnitrend was shooting for."
