= Culturally Authentic Pictorial Lexicon =

Extensive online picture dictionary

- Website type: Academic
- Available in: German; French; Chinese; Spanish; ESL
- Owner: Washington & Jefferson College
- Creator: Michael R. Shaughnessy
- Website: capl.washjeff.edu
- Registration: no
- Launched: 2003
- Current status: active
- Content license: CC BY-NC-SA 3.0 US

The Culturally Authentic Pictorial Lexicon is a dictionary database of images of various objects in a culturally authentic setting for language learning. All images are presented with a Creative Commons Attribution-NonCommercial-ShareAlike license, allowing for broad academic use by language teachers. The database is also useful for researchers in the field of applied linguistics, visual cognition, and automated image recognition. The database averages 30,000 hits per month and has been incorporated into the curricula of many college and high-school level German teachers.

The idea for the lexicon is partially based on Shaughnessy's experience with teaching materials that used American-based images and clip art to demonstrate German words and concepts. By presenting objects in their culturally authentic context, the CAPL is designed to prepare students to live in the environment where the language is spoken. The photographic entries are real photographs, not clip art, to force teachers to "teach terms for things that actually occur in everyday German life – instead of American concepts that have no direct European equivalent."

The project was founded in 2003 as a pilot project with over 1,000 unique entries for the German language. The first images were collected by Shaughnessy in Germany and Austria through a grant from W&J College. In 2006, it received a $200,000 appropriation from the U.S. federal government. In 2008, the project was expanded to include more languages thanks to an $85,480 grant from the U.S. Department of Education.

The CAPL was featured in an article in The Chronicle of Higher Education and has been recommended for use by the Goethe Institute, German Academic Exchange Office and the National Capital Language Resource Center. The book The Bilingual Mental Lexicon noted the Culturally Authentic Pictorial Lexicon's value in German language instruction for "naming and sorting activities, and in awareness-raising discussions."
