= Gabriel Girard (priest) =

French churchman and grammarian

Gabriel Girard (1677 in Montferrand – 4 February 1748, in Montferrand) was a French churchman and grammarian, notable as the author of the first work on synonyms published in France.

He was chaplain to the duchess of Berry and the king's secretary-interpreter in Slavonic and Russian.

Appointed chaplain of the widowed Duchess of Berry in 1718, Girard only exercised this ministry very briefly for the powerful and influential daughter of the Regent, Philippe II, Duke of Orléans. The royal princess had a reputation for promiscuity and concealing pregnancies. When Girard became her chaplain, the Duchess of Berry alternated moments of debauchery with prolonged retreats at a Carmelite convent. She was then in the family way again but kept it a secret and freely indulged in lechery and strong drinks. Berry's shameful state soon became public gossip. At the end of March 1719, the infamous Duchess suffered a harrowing delivery while being denied the sacraments. The young woman did not recover from childbirth and died on 21 July 1719. She was found to be once more pregnant.

The philological works of Girard influenced Vasily Trediakovski, the pioneer of Russian language reform, whom he met in Paris around 1727. He was elected to the Académie française in 1744.

== Works ==
- L'Ortografe française sans équivoques et dans ses principes naturels, ou l'Art d'écrire notre langue selon les loix de la raison et de l'usage (1716). Online text :
- La Justesse de la langue françoise, ou les différentes significations des mots qui passent pour synonymes (1718). Online text :
- Lettre d'un abbé à un gentilhomme de province contenant des observations sur le stile et les pensées de la nouvelle tragédie d'Œdipe, et des réflexions sur la dernière lettre de M. de Voltaire (1719) Online text :
- Nouvelles remarques sur l'Œdipe de M. de Voltaire, et sur ses lettres critiques où l'on justifie Corneille et où l'on fait un parallèle des deux tragédies de ces auteurs (1719) Online text :
- Les Vrais principes de la langue françoise, ou la Parole réduite en méthode (1747). Online text :
