= Chris Crawford on Game Design =

2003 book by Chris Crawford

- Author: Chris Crawford
- Illustrator: Chris Crawford
- Language: English
- Subject: Computer and video game design
- Publisher: Peachpit
- Publication date: June 2003
- Publication place: United States
- Pages: 476
- ISBN: 0-13-146099-4
- OCLC: 52937807
- Dewey Decimal: 794.8/1526 22
- LC Class: QA76.76.C672 C73 2003
- Preceded by: The Art of Computer Game Design

Chris Crawford on Game Design (ISBN 0-13-146099-4) is a book about computer and video game design by Chris Crawford. Although initially intended to be the second edition of The Art of Computer Game Design, the publisher decided, because it was a considerable expansion on the previous book, it should be considered a wholly new work. It was published by Peachpit under the New Riders imprint in 2003. It includes Crawford's response to recent game developments, such as The Sims, and dedicates a chapter to each of his first 14 published games: Tanktics, Legionnaire, Wizard, Energy Czar, Scram, Eastern Front (1941), Gossip, Excalibur, Balance of Power, Patton Versus Rommel, Siboot, The Global Dilemma: Guns & Butter, Balance of the Planet and Patton Strikes Back.

== See also ==
- List of books on computer and video games
- People games
