= The Global Dilemma: Guns or Butter =

1990 video game

- Developer: Chris Crawford
- Publisher: Mindscape
- Platforms: Classic Mac OS, MS-DOS
- Release: 1990
- Genre: Strategy
- Mode: Single-player

The Global Dilemma: Guns or Butter is a strategy video game written by Chris Crawford for Classic Mac OS and published by Mindscape in 1990. An MS-DOS version was released the same year. The game simulates macroeconomics: the player attempts to improve the economy of their country in an effort to outproduce the computer players. Over time this allows them to build up a military superiority and take over the opposing countries. If the computer beats the player, the game shows them facing an animated firing squad.

The Global Dilemma failed to achieve the play balance that Crawford desired, and he considers it among the worst games he released. It was commercially unsuccessful, earning Crawford no royalties past the advance. He used some of the same basic concepts as the basis of his next game, Balance of the Planet.

== Gameplay ==
Global Dilemma takes place on a randomly drawn continent consisting of a number of provinces. The provinces are assigned to the players in contiguous groups to create countries, one for each human or computer player. Double-clicking on a province opens a data card showing its details, including the population and details of the geography. The game starts in 1520 and each turn lasts a year. The game is modal, advancing through three stages before the computer calculates the results of the turn and displays the outcomes.

After examining the map, the player uses the Next Phase command to bring them to the economic summary screen. Here all of the basic commodities and products are listed, along with their recent production and any surplus or deficit. Some of these items are basic commodities like lumber or coal, whose production rate, or output, is governed by the number of people assigned to the task. Others, like food, use a combination of labor assignment and tools, so the output can be improved by building tools for the assigned workers.

Double-clicking on any of the economic items opens another window that shows the inputs and outputs for that item. For instance, opening the lumber item shows the number of workers assigned to producing lumber, and that the lumber is used to make charcoal, farm tools and plows. Double clicking on the charcoal icon in this window takes you to the charcoal window, which shows its input being lumber and its output being used to make pig iron and gunpowder. Double-clicking pig iron shows you its inputs as iron ore and charcoal, and its output being farm tools and swords. Lines between the various items show the amount of goods flowing through the system, along with any surplus or (if the line is missing) deficit. If an item, like iron ore, is only being used to produce one output item, only that line will be displayed.

After assigning labor, the player once again uses the Next Phase command to move to the combat commands screen on the main map. Each province now displays an icon indicating the number of troops available, and instructions to move them can be made by dragging the icons. Another use of Next Phase shows the combat outcomes on the map, or goes directly to the turn summary if there is no combat or it is completed.

In advanced games, the diplomatic system is also available. In this system the players can propose alliances to protect each other or attack others. The system shows the relationships between the leaders on a scatterplot and expressions on the faces indicating their relationship with the player. This allows the player to estimate who would join an alliance at a glance.

== Development ==
Crawford had an enormous hit with Balance of Power in 1985, selling hundreds of thousands of copies and making about $10 million for its publisher, Mindscape. During the development of Power he had cut a number of ideas to keep the game simple and allow it to fit within the 128 kB memory of the original Macintosh computers. He later concluded these ideas didn't really belong in that game anyway, especially the more detailed economics concepts, but they had always struck him as interesting.

He followed this up in 1987 with Trust & Betrayal: The Legacy of Siboot, but it was not a commercial success, in spite of being one of Crawford's favorite games. His publisher, Mindscape, asked him to do a sequel of Balance of Power as his next effort, and this was released in 1990 as Balance of Power: The 1990 Edition. Crawford was not terribly happy with the effort, considering it to be more a cleaned up version of the original than a true sequel.

Some time around this point, Crawford, Sid Meier and Dan Bunten all began work on new empire building games. They later met to discuss their designs. Meier stated his goal was to make the game fun, above anything else, and he was willing to abandon realism or depth to achieve that end. He went on to release Civilization in late 1991, which was a huge success and produced a series of sequels. Bunten was primarily interested in putting social aspects into the system, following in the footsteps of the lauded M.U.L.E. (Note: Crawford considers M.U.L.E. the best game design of all time.) Bunten went on to release Global Conquest in 1992, a four-player game with cooperative elements that received highly favorable reviews.

Crawford's game started out with the name Macro-Economic Conquest. As the name implies, his design focused on the economic aspects of production, and how they affected the running of an empire. The basic concept was to define the relationships between the raw materials and the worked goods needed to gather them; for instance, farming was improved by building farm tools, which could be built by assigning workers to create them using wood and iron. Iron, in turn, required charcoal and iron ore.

Other inputs into the design were his dissatisfaction with fixed maps and a desire to improve the diplomacy system. The first led to the creation of a purely algorithmic system for generating random continents with provinces within them. The system generated more complex and convincingly real landforms than contemporary systems like Empire, which drew blob-like shapes. Another algorithm was used to generate random names for the provinces. The second was inspired by work he had seen at Atari, Inc. by Susan Brennan that could change a face to represent different emotions. He used this concept in the game to modify the faces of the computer players when they met during diplomatic events.

== Reception ==
Crawford was not alone in considering Dilemma to be among his poorest games, but the poor sales translated into almost no reviews.

Chuck Moss reviewed the game for Computer Gaming World, and stated that "to be totally fair, it is an uneven product, one whose military and diplomatic components do not measure up to its groundbreaking economic model. In a classroom, G/B would probably get an A+ for effort, but an overall B+ in result."

In 1991, PC Format named The Global Dilemma one of the 50 best computer games ever. The editors wrote, "If it's global political simulations you're after, nobody does it better than Chris Crawford. This and his earlier offering, Balance of Power, are unparalleled works of sheer genius."
