= Getaway! (video game) =

1982 video game

- Manual with a sticker added after winning the Atari Star award.
- Publisher: Atari Program Exchange
- Designer: Mark Reid
- Platform: Atari 8-bit
- Release: 1982
- Genre: Maze
- Mode: Single-player

Getaway! is a crime-themed, multidirectional-scrolling maze game for Atari 8-bit computers. It was designed by Mark Reid and published by the Atari Program Exchange (APX) in 1982. In Getaway!, the player drives around a town stealing cash, valuable items, and the contents of armored cars, then must return the loot to their hideout. Three different police vehicles pursue, getting more aggressive as more crimes are committed.

The game won the 1983 $25,000 Atari Star Award for best APX submission, but promotion of the game was affected by the video game crash of 1983. The Atari Program Exchange also sold 2 × 3 foot posters of the Getaway! map.

== Gameplay ==
The player's green car, between some money ($) and a pursuing police vehicle

Getaway! takes place on multidirectional-scrolling map of a town, 35 screens in size, containing bridges, factories, neighborhoods, and an airport. The player leaves the hideout and drives around the city using up gasoline in the process. Pausing at a gas station refills the tank. Also in the maze are dollar signs (which give a little money when collected), armored vans (which give a lot of money and immediately alert the police), and three loot items. Completing a level requires collecting all three loot items, then the armored van, and then returning to the hideout. A level must be completed within one day/night cycle.

The more money being carried—displayed as "CASH" below the scrolling maze—the more aggressive the three different police vehicles are. If the player is caught, any cash is lost as well as one of the player's three cars. Cash is locked-in by dropping it off at the hideout, where it becomes part of the permanent stash (shown at the top of the screen) and causes the police to lose interest. This can be done at any time. As the game progresses, police begin setting up roadblocks and stop signs. Hitting a roadblock (shown as an "X" in the road) puts a hole in the gas tank, causing it to drain quickly until stopping at a gas station. Running into a stop sign (a slowly blinking octagon) causes all of the cash being carried to be lost.

The value of the dollar signs goes up with each level, in addition to there being new loot items to collect. Each level has an associated rating, starting with "Hoodlum", then "Lowlife", with the seventh level being "The Boss". The speed of the player's vehicle increases at level 7.

== Development ==
Mark Reid, a chemical engineer, had two games published by APX prior to Getaway!: an implementation of Klondike Solitaire, simply titled Solitaire, and the vertically scrolling skiing game Downhill.

Getaway! was inspired the scrolling map of Eastern Front (1941). He wrote an Atari BASIC program to let him draw the city. Getaway! originally contained music from police-themed TV shows, such as Dragnet, but it was removed before submitting the game to APX because Reid did not have permission to use it.

== Release ==
In addition to the game, the Atari Program Exchange sold 2 × 3 foot posters of the Getaway! city map illustrated by Jim M'Guinness. A section of the poster was used for the cover of the Fall 1983 APX catalog. Most APX games were sold exclusively via mail order, but Getaway was included in catalogs from retailers such as Sears.

According to Reid, Atari had "big plans" for the game, then the video game crash of 1983 occurred. When the Atari Program Exchange folded, many games from APX were rereleased by Antic Software, but Reid declined because of the exclusive contract he had signed with Atari, Inc.

== Reception ==
Getaway! won first place in the entertainment category of the quarterly APX awards. It beat three other nominees to win the $25,000 Atari Star award in 1983, following My First Alphabet (1981) and Typo Attack (1982). It was the final such award given before the Atari Program Exchange shut down.

In COMPUTE! magazine, Steven Levy wrote that he was impressed by the detail of the graphics and initially drove around the map just to see the town. He called the game a variation on the maze concept, but said that in Getaway! there is more variety and detail. Kyle Peacock of ANALOG Computing pointed out the work that must have gone into constructing the city. He mentioned the armored car as his favorite feature and noted that as the sun sets, driving becomes more difficult. John J. Anderson, writing for Creative Computing, was enamored with the multidirectional scrolling and concluded, "Getaway is lots of fun". InfoWorld's Essential Guide to Atari Computers cited its "realistic police-siren sound effects and fast action".

== Legacy ==
In January 2017, Reid made available a collection of programming documents from when he was working on the game, as well as correspondence with APX and Antic Software.

== See also ==
- Armored Car
