= Scram (video game) =

1981 video game

- Developer: Chris Crawford
- Publisher: Atari, Inc.
- Platform: Atari 8-bit
- Release: 1981
- Genres: Educational, simulation

Scram: A Nuclear Power Plant Simulation is an educational simulation video game developed for Atari 8-bit computers by Chris Crawford and published by Atari, Inc. in 1981. Written in Atari BASIC, Scram uses differential equations to simulate nuclear reactor behavior. The player controls the valves and switches of the reactor directly with the joystick.

This game's title, "SCRAM", is taken from the term for an emergency shutdown of a nuclear reactor. It refers to immediately inserting all control rods into the reactor core to stop the reaction process. The game also recreates the Three Mile Island Unit 2 nuclear reactor and allowed players to recreate the events that took place there in 1979.

== Gameplay ==
The game display shows a schematic-like representation of a light water reactor, typical of nuclear reactors in use in the United States at that time. The reactor core is on the left of the screen, with the primary coolant loop to its immediate right. Further right is the secondary cooling loop, and finally the tertiary cooling loop and its associated cooling tower.

The user interacts with the game by moving the joystick, which makes a cursor jump from one "hot spot" to another on the screen, each one controlling one part of the reactor systems. There are hot spots for the control rods, cooling pumps and valves. The user can experiment with the reactor systems by moving the joystick up and down, operating the equipment. It is possible to simulate a meltdown by shutting off the primary cooling pumps and withdrawing the control rods all the way.

The game has several skill levels, which control the frequency of earthquakes and the obviousness of the damage. In the event of an earthquake the screen shakes, and a breaking sound is heard if there is damage. The user then has to watch the on-screen displays to try to isolate where the problem is.

== Reception ==
One big fan of Scram was Harold Denton, the Director of the Office of Nuclear Reactor Regulation at the Nuclear Regulatory Commission. In an interview with Atari Connection magazine, he called it "a fascinating game" and "a great tool for learning what goes on in a reactor."

Enter gave it a mixed review, with one reviewer calling it "not fun" while another stated it "was not fast-paced... but it's good." He concluded that "If you buy this game to learn about nuclear reactors, you'll get your money's worth and then some." while the co-reviewer concluded "But if you're buying it to have fun, you're going to be disappointed". Softline in 1981 seemed to enjoy the game overall, but criticized the documentation, calling it "needlessly wordy and confusing". In contrast, a review in the New Jersey Atari Computer Group (JACG) newsletter praised the extremely detailed documentation, but concluded that the game itself might be too technical for some players. InfoWorld's Essential Guide to Atari Computers recommended the game among educational software for the Atari 8-bit.

== Legacy ==
In 2013 Crawford released the source code of several of his games, including Scram, to the public.
