= Legionnaire (video game) =

1982 video game

- Publisher: Avalon Hill
- Designer: Chris Crawford
- Platforms: Atari 8-bit, Commodore 64, Apple II
- Release: 1982
- Genres: Wargame, real-time strategy
- Mode: Single-player

Legionnaire is a computer wargame for Atari 8-bit computers created by Chris Crawford released through Avalon Hill in 1982. Recreating Julius Caesar's campaigns in a semi-historical setting, the player takes command of the Roman legions in real-time battles against the barbarians.

== Gameplay ==
Similar to Crawford's earlier groundbreaking Eastern Front (1941) in terms of display and general gameplay, Legionnaire added a real-time computer opponent, and is one of the earliest examples of a real-time tactics (RTT) game.

In the game, the player takes the side of the Romans, playing the role of Julius Caesar and giving orders to their forces in real time. The computer plays as generic barbarian tribes, in blue, with the player's legions in pink. There are three types of units: infantry is represented by a sword, cavalry by a horse head, and Caesar's own Imperial Guard by an eagle. Orders are given to the units by moving a cursor over them with the joystick and then holding down the joystick button; existing commands are displayed as a moving arrow, and new orders can be entered by pressing the joystick in the four cardinal directions.

Mid-game in Legionnaire. The Roman forces are moving into position on a hill (pink is the highest elevation), awaiting the arrival of the barbarian forces moving in from the right. Cicero's legion is selected, under the pink square cursor, and the display shows that it is in the process of moving to a new location, shown in blue.

Like Eastern Front, the Legionnaire playfield consists of a large grid of square cells with various terrain features displayed on it. Unlike Eastern Front, the new map includes varying altitudes, displayed as a series of contour lines. Movement is affected by the contours as well as by the underlying terrain, making positional combat an important part of the game's overall strategy. The screen shows only a small portion of the entire map at one time, smooth-scrolling around it when the joystick-controlled cursor reaches the edge of the screen. Unlike Eastern Front, the map contains no cities or strategic locations, and the game starts with both forces placed at random locations on the map.

While the player is entering orders for their units, the computer is calculating moves for its own units. A basic form of multitasking was implemented by having the "easy" jobs of reading the joystick and recording the user's inputs during the vertical blank interrupt (VBI), while the computer AI ran during non-interrupt time. The player is forced to search the map for the enemy and then attempt to gather their units into a fighting line on favorable terrain. The challenge is doing this quickly enough, before the enemy forces arrive and attack your units piecemeal. As in Eastern Front, the AI is not particularly strong, but the real-time action makes the game more difficult, as well as eliminating several "tricks" one could use to fool the AI.

The game lacks any strategic component driving the gameplay, so it is possible for the player to simply move to an advantageous position, form up a solid line, and wait. Historically, Roman forces were in general much more adept in close combat than their barbarian opponents and would win any one-on-one fight. The game's scoring system attempted to make up for this, awarding higher points for faster victories. In pursuit of a higher score the player is forced to seek out and attack the barbarian units on terms that might not be as favorable and which, without quick retreats after combat, might result in encirclement or exhaustion.

== Development ==
Chris Crawford wrote an early version of Legionnaire for the Commodore PET in 1979. This was a fairly simple game using character graphics and a limited amount of logic. He later ported this to the Atari 8-bit computers and released it as Centurion, but the game saw limited sales.

After writing Eastern Front (1941), Crawford was looking for ways to use the new scrolling-map technology introduced in that game. Avalon Hill had approached Crawford with positive comments about Eastern Front, and he promised to make a game for them. After three months of preliminary work, he started development in January 1982, delivering the first version in February and a final version in June. Crawford published an article on game design in the December 1982 issue of BYTE, using Legionnaire as an example.

Legionnaire was the last game Crawford would release using the original Eastern Front engine. His next game for the Atari was Excalibur, which used a different model of interaction based on moving from room to room within a virtual castle. When Atari collapsed in 1984, he turned his attention to the Macintosh computer, releasing the famous Balance of Power in 1985.

== Reception ==
Computer Gaming World in 1982 described Legionnaire as "a game that anyone can sit down and play without reading endless instructions or learning complex strategies". The reviewer stated that "the real time action in this game is my favorite point ... I know I'll be at the computer for an hour at the most", and concluded it was "as challenging as Eastern Front and immensely more playable". In 1990 and 1993 surveys of strategy and war games, however, the magazine gave the game two-plus stars out of five, calling it a "marginally historical simulation of Roman tactics". Compute! compared the game to Eastern Front and felt it would "appeal to a much broader audience because the game is faster-paced, has fewer units to control, and is, therefore, a faster game." Softline called Legionnaire "a well-documented and thought-out program ... easy to learn and difficult to play well", with graphics that were "a fine piece of work", and concluded that "On a scale of 1 to 100, this is a 95".

Creative Computing's review was mixed, calling it a "successful effort" but pointing out several issues. InfoWorld's lengthy review was much more positive, rating it highly in its checkbox review, but giving a somewhat more muted conclusion that "Legionnaire is a special game for a certain kind of player." BYTE mocked Legionnaire's cover art as being of poor quality, but called the game "great entertainment, even for those who haven't been war-game fans before". A later review called it "the perfect solitaire game", citing as improvements on Eastern Front multiple scenarios and durations and real-time play, and concluded that Legionnaire "is a wonderful game that ... combines the graphics and movement of arcade games with the depth of strategy games". By contrast, BYTE columnist Jerry Pournelle, a fan of Avalon Hill board games, disliked Legionnaire. He stated that its real-time made it "an arcade game masquerading as a game of strategy", and described the Apple II version's interface and graphics as poor. While stating that "fast reflexes are not essential to winning the game" Crawford acknowledged the Apple version's poor quality, stating that he had advised against porting it and did not work on it. He advised Pournelle to "get an Atari and play the real game on a real games computer".

The Addison-Wesley Book of Atari Software 1984 gave the game an overall A rating, criticizing the "annoying" sound but praising the graphics, and concluded that it was "a very good introduction to war game playing".

== Legacy ==
Legionnaire was nominated for "Best Adventure Game for Home Computer" at the 1983 Origins Game Fair. Even as the game was being released, however, Crawford expressed his doubt that it would have the lasting power of Eastern Front. He later wrote in Chris Crawford on Game Design that he considered it competent, but "Neither the original version nor the Avalon-Hill version of the game was a great game ...certainly no masterpiece. It was good experience for me, but I would have spent my time better had I moved on to something that fired my imagination."

In 2013, Crawford publicly released the source code of several of his games, including Legionnaire.
