= Patton Versus Rommel =

1986 video game

Patton vs. Rommel
- Developers: Chris Crawford (Mac); Sculptured Software (C64, MS-DOS)
- Publisher: Electronic Arts
- Designer: Chris Crawford
- Platforms: Commodore 64, MS-DOS, Mac
- Release: 1986: Mac; 1987: C64, MS-DOS
- Genre: Computer wargame
- Modes: Single-player, multiplayer

Patton vs. Rommel is a computer wargame designed and programmed by Chris Crawford for the Macintosh and published by Electronic Arts in 1986. Versions for MS-DOS compatible operating systems and Commodore 64 were developed by Sculptured Software and published in 1987.

== Plot ==
Patton vs. Rommel is set in and around the Normandy beachhead shortly after the D-Day invasion of June, 1944. American, Canadian and British forces are placed in the correct positions as the Allied advance started to bog down. The German forces of Rommel are likewise in place defending Caen and other cities.

== Gameplay ==
To win the game, the Allied player must advance further and faster than the real-life Allied forces. For the Rommel-side player to win, they must defend more territory longer than the actual German defenders. If the German side can effectively counter and stall the Allied attacks and prevent a breakthrough, the Rommel player will usually win.

This creates a dynamic where the Patton player must look for a way to create a hole in the German lines wide enough to push one or more armored divisions through into the German rear area. Since almost all of the German forces are concentrated at the front, the principle of fog of war means units that are not within sight of enemy units "disappear" from the game map and from the mind of the enemy. When they suddenly reappear in a surprise attack from the rear, they have an enormous advantage over the units they are attacking. In this way, an Allied player can roll up a major element of the German line and achieve a victory.

In real history, the Allies eventually broke through and surrounded several German panzer and infantry divisions, which were decimated as they attempted to escape through the Falaise Gap. In the game, this decisive victory requires practice and skill by the Allied player.

== Development ==
After the success of Crawford's game Balance of Power, EA wanted to work with him, but could not acquire the rights to sequel the game from its publisher, Mindscape. Instead, they suggested he build on the tradition of his seminal Atari 8-bit game Eastern Front.

Crawford elected to focus the game's design on fog of war and the personalities of American general George Patton and the German field marshal Erwin Rommel. In real life the two were never involved together in a major confrontation, as Rommel was wounded in 1944 and later forced to commit suicide (due to his association with the anti-Hitler conspirators of the July 20 plot), before Patton had command in large-scale land operations. The game's AI, however, worked to be true to the strategies of each of the two generals.

== Reception ==
Computer Gaming World described the game as "very playable", admiring its in-game advisors and simple movement scheme, even allowing units to queue actions that are remembered turn-to-turn. A 1991 survey of strategy and war games, however, gave it two and a half stars out of five, and a 1993 survey of wargames gave the game two stars. Crawford himself did not believe the game would be popular, describing it in a 1987 interview as "not a great game. It is a good game, it is fun, but I don't feel it has greatness in its bowels ... Balance of Power I did for me [while] Patton Vs. Rommel is a game for the public". The game was very well received by war game enthusiasts, but never became popular in a wider marketplace.
