= Gossip (video game) =

- Developer: Atari, Inc.
- Publisher: Atari Program Exchange
- Designer: Chris Crawford
- Platform: Atari 8-bit
- Release: 1983
- Genre: Art game

Gossip is a video game created for Atari 8-bit computers by then-Atari, Inc. employee Chris Crawford. The documentation indicates that Gossip is an Atari Program Exchange title, but it was not listed in any of the published catalogs and may not have been released at all.

Crawford wished for video games that would simulate aspects of human social interaction via “social challenges.” He hoped these "people games" would appeal to those who were not interested in the more common gaming genres of combat and sports. Although the social interactions in Gossip are relatively simple, Crawford contends that they are comparable to the level of complexity found in The Sims.

== Gameplay ==
Screenshot

The majority of the screen is taken up with eight characters: You, Val, Joe, Liz, Amy, Dan, Sue and Tom. The player uses a joystick cursor to select a character to telephone. That person’s phone rings with a jiggling animation and ringing sound effect. He or she picks up the phone and says, “Air-oh?” The player selects a person to gossip about, and then one of five expressive animations (strong positive, slight positive, neutral, slight negative, strong negative). The listener responds with his or her own opinion of the person.

== Development ==
The social interactions he chose for this experimental simulation were declarations of affinity (e.g. “I like Fred,” “I hate Jane”). The theory behind the simulation was that people liked those who shared their opinions of others, and were also influenced positively by their friends’ opinions and negatively by their enemies’ opinions. Such declarations, Crawford said, were implicit in many pieces of gossip. He produced the following mathematical model:

$\Delta x_{l,s}=\frac{x_{l,o} x'_{s,o}}{k_1}$

$\Delta x_{l,o}=\frac{x_{l,s} x'_{s,o}}{k_2}$

where x_{a,b} is a’s actual opinion of b, x'_{a,b} is a’s declared opinion of b, l is the listener, s is the speaker, o is the object (the person being gossiped about), k_{1} and k_{2} are constants greater than 1 (Crawford gave the hypothetical value of 10, but did not specify the actual values used in the game).

The AI characters did not perform discrete interactions with each other. They instead acted as nodes in a web of springs, trying to reduce the tension around them. The original game engine was written in Atari BASIC and took hours to complete the calculations for a single turn. Two major attempts were made to rewrite the system in assembler language, which reduced the calculation time to a few moments.

One issue that was not addressed was sincerity. Also, it did not account for the fact that repeating the same statement too many times would eventually reduce its effect.

== Legacy ==
Although Crawford was proud of this game, he never developed a structure of goals and never published it. The two developers that worked on the assembler versions had a different opinion, calling it boring. Although they raised this point during development, it was said that Crawford would simply state that if they understood the concept they would know it would be fun. One of the developers quit the project due to this attitude.

Crawford applied a similar social model in Excalibur for the management of the Knights of the Round Table and diplomacy with the other kings of England.

In 2013, Crawford publicly released the source code of several of his games, including Gossip.
