= Galahad and the Holy Grail =

1982 video game

- Publishers: Atari Program Exchange; Antic Software
- Designer: Douglas Crockford
- Platform: Atari 8-bit
- Release: 1982
- Genre: Action-adventure

Galahad and the Holy Grail is an action-adventure game for Atari 8-bit computers. It was designed and programmed by Douglas Crockford and published by the Atari Program Exchange in 1982. Influenced by Adventure for the Atari VCS and Arthurian legend, it contains almost 100 rooms–according to the manual–which are switched between with a flip screen technique. The game resulted in Crockford being hired at Atari Research. Following the closure of the Atari Program Exchange, a lightly updated version of Galahad and the Holy Grail was published by Antic Software.

== Gameplay ==
The player explores the world, which is divided into single-screen areas representing indoor and outdoor locations, finding objects and overcoming obstacles. There are no enforced goals in the game, and the manual suggests choosing one or more goals and swearing to complete them, such as "to find the three keys" or "to find the Holy Grail."

The game contains references to Atari's Adventure as well as other popular games of the day. With a nod to the film Monty Python and the Holy Grail, one of the objects found in the game is a holy hand grenade.

== Development and release ==
Douglas Crockford wrote the game over a period of four months on an Atari 800 using the Atari Assembler Editor cartridge. The game was titled Knightsoil when submitted, but after Atari learned that night soil was a euphemism for excrement, it proposed changing the title. According to Crockford, "they wanted to change the name to Lancelot and the Holy Grail, and I said, 'That's OK, but Lancelot never found the Holy Grail.' So, it became Galahad and the Holy Grail." Atari Program Exchange director Fred Thorlin said the game "contained some rather risque scenes when it was initially submitted."

After the Atari Program Exchange shut down, Antic Software re-released Galahad and the Holy Grail in 1985 with the formerly printed manual on the second side of the disk. The game was sold under the same name, but the title screen was changed to read "Sir Galahad and the Holy Grail." According to an AtariAge forum member who disassembled the room structure of the game, the Antic Software version fixed a number of traversal glitches and other bugs.

== Reception ==
Galahad and the Holy Grail was included in Antic magazine's December 1983 holiday buyer's guide. The Addison-Wesley Book of Atari Software 1984 rated the game a C. The reviewer wrote, "I hate to criticize a creative game, but Galahad has features that seem illogical to the player, features not explained in the very sparse documentation."

Galahad and the Holy Grail was one of four finalists for the 1982 Atari Star Award. The winner was Typo Attack.

== Legacy ==
Galahad and the Holy Grail caused game designer Chris Crawford to hire Crockford at the research division of Atari, Inc. where he worked on hardware and programming environments.
