= Excalibur (video game) =

1983 video game

- Publisher: Atari Program Exchange
- Designers: Chris Crawford; Larry Summers; Valerie Atkinson
- Platform: Atari 8-bit
- Release: 1983
- Genre: Strategy
- Mode: Single-player

Excalibur is a resource management strategy video game for Atari 8-bit computers published in 1983. It was designed by Chris Crawford and developed with the help of Larry Summers and Valerie Atkinson. Like Crawford's earlier Eastern Front (1941), Excalibur was released through the Atari Program Exchange.

== Gameplay ==
The object of the game is to unite all of Britain under the rule of King Arthur. The players can invade kingdoms, set tithes for their vassals, send plagues and pestilences (with the help of Merlin) and manage the loyalty of their own Round Table by rewarding their knights or, if they grow too disloyal, by banishing them.

== Reception ==
Electronic Games stated that "Excalibur is a grand effort". Antic stated that the game "easily ranks as the finest programming achievement to date by Chris Crawford ... one of the richest gaming experiences ever". Computer Gaming World in 1984 called Excalibur "a magnificent piece of software". It praised the documentation and novella, and concluded by asking, "When will Chris Crawford's next game be published?" In 1990, CGW gave the game four out of five stars, stating that "even on an obsolete machine" Excalibur was still worthwhile. In 1993, the magazine gave it three-plus stars out of five.

Bill Wallace reviewed Excalibur for Fantasy Gamer magazine and stated that "It would be a shame to describe all the chrome in Excalibur. Loving care is visible in every aspect of the design. What Crawford and friends have done here is something quite new — they have given the game-player raw material to build a world. In each game of Excalibur, Britain is largely a place of your own making. I know of no other game that gives you so much control over your own fate. You won't lose this one because of bad luck. You must have a plan and, if you play well, your plan will work. You'll be the king of all Britain, forever."

The Addison-Wesley Book of Atari Software 1984 gave Excalibur an overall A rating and stated that "those who persevere will find an ample reward in the game's incredible depth". The book predicted, however, that it was "destined to become a cult game ... appeal[ing] mainly to the seasoned wargamer or fantasy role-player" because of the slow pace and difficulty.

Crawford in 1984 wrote "My greatest regret, though, is that Excalibur has not won the attention that I think it deserves. This game is my magnum opus, much grander in scale than anything else I have done. It is a shame that so few people are even aware of its existence."

== Legacy ==
In 1987, Crawford stated that Excalibur was one of the three games he was proud of, with Eastern Front and Balance of Power. In 2013, Crawford publicly released source code for several of his games, including Excalibur.

== See also ==
- Galahad and the Holy Grail
