= NRR =

NRR may refer to:

== Club ==
- Newport Reading Room, a gentlemen's club in Newport, Rhode Island

== Electronic mail ==
- No Reply Required in the subject field of an email

== Law and regulation ==
- National Recording Registry in the United States
- Non-Repudiation of receipt, a legal acknowledgement of origination/authorship of a document (as per internet RFC4130)
- Office of Nuclear Reactor Regulation in the United States

== Medicine/science ==
- Net reproduction rate in human fertility
- Nitrogen reduction reaction, the conversion of N_{2} to ammonia
- Noise reduction ratings in hearing protectors

== Music ==
- National Rock Review, an American website for rock music reviews and interviews

== Business ==
- Customer retention#NRR: Net Revenue Retention

== Sport ==
- Net run rate in cricket

== Places ==
- IATA code of José Aponte de la Torre Airport in Ceiba, Puerto Rico
