= The Art of Computer Game Design =

1984 book by Chris Crawford

- First edition
- Author: Chris Crawford
- Illustrator: Chris Crawford
- Language: English
- Subject: Computer and video game design
- Publisher: McGraw-Hill/Osborne Media
- Publication date: 1984
- Publication place: United States
- Pages: 113
- ISBN: 0-88134-117-7
- OCLC: 10277416
- Dewey Decimal: 794.8/2 19
- LC Class: GV1469.2 .C72 1984
- Followed by: Chris Crawford on Game Design

The Art of Computer Game Design by Chris Crawford is the first book devoted to the theory of computer and video games. The book attempts to categorize computer games and talks about design precepts that serve as guidelines for game designers. It was originally published in Berkeley, California, by McGraw-Hill/Osborne Media in 1984. The original edition became available as a free download from a site maintained by Washington State University, Pullman in 1997. In 2011 the free download was removed and the text is currently available as a Kindle e-book.

== Background ==
Crawford in 1981 and 1982 coauthored a series of technical articles in BYTE on developing games for the Atari 8-bit computers. The articles were collected into De Re Atari. In December 1982 he published an article in BYTE on abstract aspects of game design, using Legionnaire as example.

== Reception ==
Calling the author "a master of computer game design", PC Magazine complimented Crawford using his own games as examples of success and failure, and recommended the book to both game designers and players. Orson Scott Card was less favorable, writing in Ahoy! that "when one of the best computer game designers in the business writes a book about computer game design, you expect it to be wonderful ... And when [The Art of Computer Game Design] turned out to be merely fascinating but often shallow and sometimes just plain wrong-headed, I was disappointed".

== See also ==
- List of books about video games
- Chris Crawford on Game Design, another book by Crawford
