= Wizard (2005 video game) =

1980 video game not released until 2005

- Box art
- Developer: Atari, Inc.
- Publisher: Atari, Inc.
- Designer: Chris Crawford
- Platform: Atari 2600
- Release: NA: October 2005
- Genre: Maze
- Mode: Multiplayer

Wizard is a 1980 maze video game developed by Atari, Inc. for the Atari Video Computer System (later renamed the Atari 2600). It was programmed by Chris Crawford using a 2kB cartridge, the last Atari 2600 game developed by Atari with less than 4kB; this led to the game being unreleased due to Atari demanding it to be reworked in 4kB. Wizard was eventually released as part of the Atari Flashback 2 package in 2005.

== Gameplay ==
Screenshot

The player is a wizard from Irata (Atari spelled backwards) and battles imps in a maze. It's not a symmetric battle: the player is faster than the enemy, but the enemy can go through walls and fire faster than the player can. There is no need to aim, as the angle of the player's fire is automatically sent in the direction of the enemy. The enemy remains invisible when it is behind a wall. It also has heart beat audio, which becomes louder as the player gets closer to the enemy.

== Development ==
The production of Wizard is detailed extensively in the book Chris Crawford on Game Design. Crawford wanted to write software for the new Atari 8-bit computers, but Atari management required developers to create an Atari VCS game first.

Wizard was never published for the Atari VCS. It was included with the Atari Flashback 2, 25 years after it was written. Chris Crawford learned about the release in an email from a fan. Crawford's original prototype did not contain a two-player mode, but the game released with the Atari Flashback 2 does.
