= Kangaroo (video game) =

1982 video game

- North American arcade flyer
- Developer: Sun Electronics (Note: Atari 5200 version developed by General Computer Corporation.)
- Publishers: JP: Sun Electronics; NA: Atari, Inc.
- Platforms: Arcade, Atari 2600, Atari 5200, Atari 8-bit
- Release: Arcade; JP: May 1982; NA: June 1982; 2600; July 1983; 5200; August 1983; Atari 8-bit; 1983
- Genre: Platform
- Modes: Single-player, multiplayer

Kangaroo (Note: Japanese: カンガルー, Hepburn: Kangarū) is a 1982 platform video game developed and published by Sun Electronics for arcades. It was released in Japan in May 1982 and in North America by Atari, Inc. in June 1982. It is one of the first arcade video games similar to Donkey Kong without being a direct clone. The player takes the role of a boxing glove-wearing mother kangaroo who is trying to rescue her joey from fruit-throwing monkeys. Jumping is integral to the game, but there is no jump button; instead, the player pushes up on the joystick—or up and diagonally—to leap. The arcade version of Kangaroo has visible glitches in the graphics, such as sprites briefly flickering.

Atari published ports for the Atari 2600 and Atari 5200; the 5200 version was ported to Atari 8-bit computers and sold through the Atari Program Exchange.

== Gameplay ==
The mother kangaroo at the bottom of the first level, and her blindfolded joey at the top

There are four different levels. Three of them consist of the mother kangaroo on the bottom floor trying to reach the top floor where her joey is being held captive by some monkeys. On each of the levels monkeys throw apples and apple cores, which the mother kangaroo must either jump, duck, or punch. If she gets face to face with one of the monkeys, she can punch it with a boxing glove. There are also pieces of fruit that she can jump up and get for points; if she jumps and touches a bell, higher-value fruits will appear to replace the ones she has already collected. She must be wary of the big Ape, who will occasionally appear and try to take her gloves away from her. The level must be completed before the time runs out; otherwise, the player will lose a life.

Levels 1, 2 and 4 consist of different platforms that the mother kangaroo must jump onto or climb onto via a ladder. On the third level, the joey is in a cage held up by a troop of monkeys, and there is a horde of apples that will be unleashed if five monkeys climb up to it. On this level, the mother kangaroo must punch each monkey in the stack several times until the cage is lowered and, when the cage has been lowered enough, the mother kangaroo must climb to the next floor to get to the joey before the cage is raised again.

The game uses classical and folk songs, including "Turkish March" by Ludwig van Beethoven (at game start), "American Patrol" by F. W. Meacham (during regular gameplay), "Oh! Susanna" by Stephen Foster (level completion fanfare), and "Westminster Quarters" (when a bell is rung).

== Ports ==
Level 2 of the Atari 8-bit version

Atari, Inc. published ports of Kangaroo for the Atari 2600 and Atari 5200 in 1983.

Jim Leiterman of Atari Research ported the Atari 5200 cartridge to the internally similar Atari 8-bit computers in one day. He used a tool he had written to disassemble the game code, then modified the source and assembled an Atari 8-bit version. Leiterman submitted it to the Atari Program Exchange and requested they publish it without attribution. This was unusual, as APX was created to publish user-written software, not licensed ports or software developed internally at Atari.

== Reception ==
Arcade Express gave the arcade version an 8 out of 10 in November 1982.

The Atari 5200 version of Kangaroo was reviewed by Video magazine in its "Arcade Alley" column where it received mixed commentary. While describing the game as "an excellent piece of work", reviewers also admitted that it had "fail[ed] to bowl [them] over" and criticized the game's "animation-quality graphics" which appeared to be used primarily to "dress up rudimentary play-action". It was later awarded "1984 Best Arcade-to-Home Video Game/Computer Game Translation" at the 5th annual Arkie Awards, where judges noted that "all aspects of the game look and play" as a "virtual duplicate" of the arcade version.

Charles Ardai, reviewing the Atari 2600 version for Electronic Fun with Computers & Games, wrote that despite having "horrible" graphics and sound, the gameplay of Kangaroo is better than in the arcades.

== Legacy ==
In 1984, Kangaroo and Space Ace replaced Pitfall Harry, Frogger, and Donkey Kong Jr. in CBS's Saturday Supercade. The cartoon revolves around kangaroos Katy (voiced by Mea Martineau) and Joey (voiced by David Mendenhall) who live in a zoo run by the zookeeper Mr. Friendly (voiced by Arthur Burghardt). The series has never been officially released on DVD or VHS.

Hamster Corporation released the game as part of their Arcade Archives series for the Nintendo Switch and PlayStation 4 in July 2020.
