= John Large =

Chartered Consulting Engineer (1943–2018)

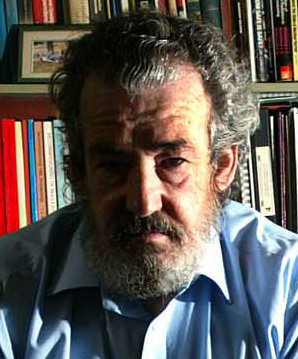
John Large

John Henry Large (4 May 1943 – 3 November 2018) (Note: One of Large's three newspaper obituaries gives a different date of death, The Daily Telegraph giving 2 November 2018) was an English consulting Chartered Engineer primarily known for his work in assessing and reporting upon nuclear safety and nuclear related accidents and incidents, work which has often featured in the media.

== Early life ==
Large was born in Woking, but grew up in the East End of London. He was the son of a Fleet Street printer and the landlady of three pubs near Bermondsey. He was educated at a secondary school in south-east London (Note: Large's obituaries differ on which secondary school he attended, The Times giving Dulwich College and The Guardian giving Wilson's Grammar School) then Camberwell School of Art, before studying engineering at Imperial College London.

== Career ==
After university, Large moved to the United States to work on U.S. nuclear weapons projects. This required him to take U.S. citizenship, but due to the risk of Vietnam War conscription he returned to the UK.

From the mid-1960s until 1986 Large was an academic in Brunel University's School of Engineering, becoming a lecturer in 1971, where he undertook research for the United Kingdom Atomic Energy Authority, particularly on the Advanced Gas-cooled Reactor design.

During the 1980s, Large was an advisor on nuclear issues to Shadow Secretary of State for Energy Tony Blair.

In 1986, he founded the London-based consulting engineers Large & Associates, which specialised in analysis of and reporting on failure of engineering systems, particularly in the nuclear field, which at one time employed up to 40 people.

The International Atomic Energy Agency (IAEA) invited Large to visit China, Korea and Iran to give advice on their nuclear programmes. He visited Japan on behalf of Greenpeace following the Fukushima Daiichi nuclear disaster, and his first technical assessment confirmed a triple reactor meltdown well before it was officially acknowledged.

Large was a Chartered Engineer, a Fellow of the Institution of Mechanical Engineers and a Fellow of the Royal Society of Arts.

=== Major projects ===
He advised the Government of Gibraltar on nuclear safety aspects of the repairs being undertaken to the nuclear propulsion reactor on board HMS Tireless during 2000.

Large formed and led the nuclear risk assessment team involved in raising of the sunken and severely damaged Russian nuclear submarine Kursk in 2001 - the world's first successful recovery of a nuclear powered submarine. Large was among those awarded a medal by the Rubin Central Design Bureau for Marine Engineering for the recovery.

He provided technical evidence in the Friends of the Earth legal action over the failure of the steam generators of the Southern California San Onofre Nuclear Generating Station in 2013. His evidence to the Atomic Safety and Licensing Board significantly contributed to their decision that the novel proposed operational changes to restart the reactors constituted the regulatory definition of "tests or experiments", requiring the obtaining of an operating license amendment. This led to the operators deciding to "permanently retire" the reactors.

He reported upon the so-called 'carbon anomaly' that resulted in the temporary shutdown and resumption to power generation under restrictive conditions of 18 French nuclear power plants in 2016-17. Separately, he advised on related quality control issues in Japan.

=== Critical reviewer ===
At times, Large was critical of the nuclear power industry, and was commissioned by Greenpeace and other national and international NGOs to provide technical analysis on nuclear issues.

In 1985 Large was invited by House of Commons Environment Committee to submit evidence on environmental issues associated with radioactive waste at the UK's irradiated fuel reprocessing works at Sellafield. He provided the Committee with a technical note on the breakaway corrosion of Magnox nuclear fuel, demonstrating the then hitherto undisclosed highly unstable pyrophoric reaction. Resulting from this disclosure, he provided evidence on the secrecy practised by the UK nuclear industry.

In 2003 Large submitted a paper for publication to the Institution of Mechanical Engineers about the danger of a terrorist attack on UK nuclear installations. The paper was passed to the UK security services and then suppressed on the advice of the UK government, although the work was subsequently published overseas in revised form.

In November 2014, following a spate of overflights of French nuclear power plants by unmanned aerial vehicles (UAV), Large provided evidence to the French Parliament (in the open session of Office parlementaire d'évaluation des choix scientifiques et technologiques) relating to the vulnerabilities of plants to drone intrusion. The Large & Associates' report on the drone activity, commissioned by Greenpeace France, remains confidential but aroused considerable media speculation.

== Death ==
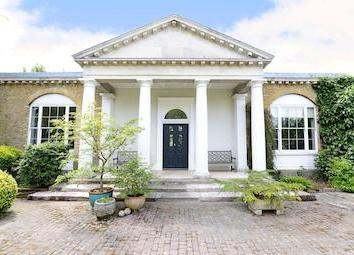
Gatehouse of the Royal Artillery Barracks which Large and his partner renovated and lived in

Large died on 3 November 2018 from an abdominal aortic aneurysm, at the age of 75. He was survived by his partner Jenny Sherrell and a daughter from an earlier relationship. Large and his partner lived in a converted neoclassical gatehouse of the Royal Artillery Barracks in Woolwich, London, which they had renovated from a damaged and neglected condition.
