= Patton Strikes Back =

1991 video game

Patton Strikes Back: The Battle of the Bulge
- Developer: Chris Crawford
- Publisher: Broderbund
- Platforms: MS-DOS, Macintosh
- Release: December 1991
- Genres: Computer wargame, Real-time tactics

Patton Strikes Back: The Battle of the Bulge is a 1991 computer wargame designed by Chris Crawford and published by Broderbund for the Macintosh and MS-DOS.

== Gameplay ==
Patton Strikes Back is a computer wargame that simulates the Battle of the Bulge during World War II. The game moves in real-time in between the player issuing orders to units. This play speed can be adjusted to slow down or speed up. The game includes difficulty levels, and the ability to set realistic or random variables for weather and reinforcements. However, the player can also choose and watch a full computer simulation of both sides in-game.

== Development ==
Patton Strikes Back was developed by designer Chris Crawford and released in December 1991.

== Reception ==
Alan Emrich reviewed the game for Computer Gaming World, and stated that "When a professional critic like this reviewer can't find some chink in a game's armor, the design and development work must have been thoroughly executed."

In Game Players PC Entertainment, William R. Trotter wrote that "Chris Crawford has given all computer games something wonderful to behold". He described Patton Strikes Back as "a potential classic".

Game Players PC Entertainment named Patton Strikes Back the year's best wargame, and praised it for "rethinking the concept of what a war game should be". The editors of PCGames nominated Patton Strikes Back for their award of the best strategy game of 1992, but gave the prize to Crisis in the Kremlin. They nevertheless called Patton "sure proof that war games without lots of numbers, hex grids, and situation-specific rules ... can be fun."
