= Balance of Power: The 1990 Edition =

1990 computer strategy game

- Developer: Chris Crawford
- Publisher: Mindscape
- Platforms: Amiga, Apple IIGS, Atari ST, Macintosh, Windows
- Release: 1989
- Genre: Strategy
- Modes: Single-player, multiplayer

Balance of Power: The 1990 Edition is a sequel to the computer strategy game Balance of Power.

== Development ==
Balance of Power: The 1990 Edition was released in 1989 on the Apple IIGS, Windows, Macintosh, Amiga and Atari ST. Chris Crawford who created both the original Balance of Power and Balance of Power: The 1990 Edition does not consider the latter as a proper sequel, saying he was simply "tidying up, adding some bells and whistles." Balance of Power: The 1990 Edition adds more countries, advisors to help the player, a new "multi-polar" level that allows countries to generate events of their own (such as declaring war on other countries) and a 2-player hotseat mode.

== Reception ==
Gary Whitta for The One said "An outstanding piece of strategy gaming – especially in two-player mode (even without a modem option). Worthwhile even for those who own the original."

Steve Williams for Family Computing said "For the new multipolar level alone, I would consider The 1990 Edition to be a major improvement over the original Balance of Power. The addition of 78 active participants makes it a new game altogether."

In 1989 Compute! stated that the 1990 edition's multipolar features were welcome additions to the game. That year Orson Scott Card stated that the magazine's 1988 list caused him to reevaluate the game when playing the 1990 edition, stating that it had "the most detailed, carefully extrapolated future world I've worked with". While still criticizing geopolitical "absurdities" such as forcing the United States to passively accept Soviet troops in Syria (contrary to what happened during the Yom Kippur War) and advisors in Mexico or start nuclear war, Card now concluded that such outcomes probably reflected computer limitations rather than Crawford's political views. He advised players to pretend that Balance of Power was set on an alien planet "astonishingly similar" to Earth, and to play solely based on the game's assumptions about the world. Chuck Moss disagreed with Card's revised view, describing Balance of Power in Computer Gaming World in 1992 as "reflect[ing] extreme bias on the part of [its] designers". He called it a "pacifist treatise ... nuclear war erupted if the U.S. so much as sent five million dollars to Panama".
