= Trust & Betrayal: The Legacy of Siboot =

1987 video game

- Developer: Chris Crawford
- Publisher: Mindscape
- Platform: Macintosh
- Release: 1987
- Genre: Simulation
- Mode: Single-player

Trust & Betrayal: The Legacy of Siboot, often abbreviated simply to Siboot (pronounced /ˈsiːbuːt/, SEE-boot), was a game designed and programmed by Chris Crawford for the Macintosh and published by Mindscape in 1987.

== Gameplay ==
The player, an alien creature named Vetvel, must compete with six other acolytes (each a different alien species) for the Shepherdship. Each of these characters has a distinct personality. Each morning, the acolytes wake up knowing one of each of the three "auras" the others possess. They must trade knowledge with each other in order to try to gain enough knowledge for the "mind combat" that takes place every night, which is basically a fancy Rock, Paper, Scissors game that depends on the aura counts for the players involved. The game is won when a player gets eight auras in all three categories. However, in giving away somebody's aura count, the player betrays that person, which angers them and may make them less likely to trade aura counts with the player. Therefore, a player has to know who to trust and who to betray, hence the title: Trust & Betrayal.

If the player clicks and holds the mouse button on an icon (the game's abstraction of a word), one can see its meaning. The number of icons is small enough, and the pictures intuitive enough, that they can quickly be committed to memory.

The game uses an inverse parser, a method for constructing sentences out of words while only presenting words that make sense for the given context. It also emphasizes facial expressions as form of feedback. Interludes appear through the game present the user with one of several choices which may affect the gameplay. To use an actual example from the game, if game designer Chris Crawford appears and lectures the player, and the player responds "Go to hell, Crawford!", then he or she loses some favor among the other characters, making the game harder to win.

== Development ==
"Siboot", the name of the first Shepherd, is a reversal of the syllables of "Bootsie", a cat which Crawford had. Bootsie had to be euthanized due to an irreparable injury to his jaw. Crawford suffered much grief while contemplating that he was unable to talk to Bootsie in order to try to comfort him before he had to be put down. One day while pondering this, Crawford had a flash of insight: his next game would be Talk to the Animals, which evolved into the very different Trust & Betrayal.

A preliminary IBM PC port was made but never finished.

Crawford considered Siboot the favorite of his games and "the game of which I'm most proud" due to its innovations and creativity.

== Reception ==
Reception

Review scores
Publication	Score
Computer Gaming World	2/5
Dragon	4.5/5
MacUser	4.5/5

Award
Publication	Award
Macworld	Best Role-Playing Game (1988)

Siboot was poorly received in the marketplace and did not recoup its investment. It sold about 5,000 units on the Macintosh. After the game's commercial failure, Mindscape pressed Chris Crawford for a sequel to Balance of Power, and he developed Balance of Power: The 1990 Edition because "I felt I owed them one."

Macworld inducted Siboot into its 1988 Game Hall of Fame in the Best Role-Playing Game category, ahead of runner-up Reach for the Stars. Macworld called the game Crawford's "best effort to date" and praised it as "a landmark in computer gaming, perfectly simpatico with the Macintosh, and deserving of its own cult."

MacUser awarded Siboot 4½ out of 5 mice. The review said that the game's focus on political intrigue and interacting with six distinct artificial personalities resulted in "a brilliant effort to expand the horizons of computer gaming."

The game received a favorable review in Computer Gaming World in 1988, citing the well-written AIs and noting "The context sensitive icon-based language is a technical achievement and deserves praise." In a 1992 survey of science fiction games the magazine stated that the game had "Innovative concepts marred by slow and obtuse game play". In 1994, the same publication reprinted its 1992 review of the game for its survey of strategic space games, adding a rating of two stars out of five.

The game was reviewed in 1989 in Dragon #150 by Mark D. Veljkov in "The Role of Computers" column. It received 4½ out of 5 stars.

== Legacy ==
In 2013 Crawford publicly released the source code of several of his games, including Trust & Betrayal.

In January 2013, Crawford began work on a redesigned version of Siboot, borrowing the world and premise of the 1987 game and taking advantage of advances in computer power. In June 2015, he launched a Kickstarter project to fund the redesigned game. The project's funding was unsuccessful and Crawford abandoned developing the redesigned Siboot in 2018.
