= Nuclear policy of the United States =

Nuclear policy of the United States refers to the policies of the various agencies and departments of its federal government with regard to biomedical, energy, emergency response, hazardous waste transport and disposal and military; including US policy with regard to its participation in international treaties, conventions and organizations and may also include management and regulation of nuclear levels in air, food, ground water and other potentially hazardous sources.

It may specifically refer to:

- Nuclear energy policy of the United States
- Low-level radioactive waste policy of the United States
- Nuclear weapons and the United States
- Nuclear Regulatory Commission
- Office of Nuclear Reactor Regulation

== See also ==
- Environmental policy of the United States
- Nuclear energy policy by country
- Nuclear power debate
- List of United States nuclear weapons tests
- United States and weapons of mass destruction
