= Atari Pascal =

The Atari Pascal Language System (usually shortened to Atari Pascal) is a version of the Pascal programming language released by Atari, Inc. for the Atari 8-bit computers in March 1982. Atari Pascal was published through the Atari Program Exchange as unsupported software instead of in Atari's official product line. It requires two disk drives, which greatly limited its potential audience. It includes a 161-page manual.

== Development ==
Atari Pascal was developed by MT Microsystems, which was owned by Digital Research. It's similar to MT/PASCAL+ from the same company. The compiler produces code for a virtual machine, as with UCSD Pascal, instead of generating machine code, but the resulting programs are as much as seven times faster than Apple Pascal. MT Microsystems wrote Atari Pascal with a planned "super Atari" 8-bit model in mind, one with 128K of RAM and dual-floppy drives (similar to a common configuration of the 1983 Apple IIe). This machine never materialized, but the software was released because of pressure within Atari, though only through the Atari Program Exchange.

Atari's 1980 in-store demonstration program mentions Pascal as one of the available programming languages, despite Atari Pascal not being released until 1982.

== Other Pascal implementations ==
Draper Pascal for the Atari 8-bit computers was released in 1983, Kyan Pascal in 1986, and CLSN Pascal in 1989. Each works with a single floppy drive, a point emphasized in Draper Pascal magazine ads.
