= Geopolitique 1990 =

1983 strategy video game

- Publisher(s): Strategic Simulations
- Platform(s): Apple II, Commodore 64
- Release: 1983
- Genre(s): Strategy

Geopolitique 1990 is a 1983 video game published by Strategic Simulations.

== Gameplay ==
Geopolitique 1990 is a game in which the player controls the United States in opposition to the USSR played by the computer.

== Reception ==
Bob Proctor reviewed the game for Computer Gaming World, and stated that "Geopolitique 1990 is not only an excellent game, it is an innovative one. It would be nice if it were more detailed (less abstract), it would be nice if you could play either side, it would be VERY nice if there were a two-player version. But I'm not finding fault with what is there; just wishfully thinking of what I'd like to see added to an already full disk."
