= Tanktics: Computer Game of Armored Combat on the Eastern Front =

1976 video game

- Developer: Chris Crawford
- Publisher: Avalon Hill
- Platforms: Apple II, Atari 8-bit, PET, TRS-80
- Release: 1976
- Genre: Computer wargame

Tanktics: Computer Game of Armored Combat on the Eastern Front is a 1976 two-player tank battle computer wargame by Chris Crawford. It was Crawford's first video game. He initially self-published it as Wargy I. It was published by Avalon Hill in 1981 as Tanktics.

The game has no graphics; the player moves tokens on a physical map to represent a tank battle, with the computer controlling one of the sides.

The game received weak reviews by critics, who found the artificial intelligence to be weak and suited for players who wanted neither a complex nor fast-paced game.

== Gameplay ==
The game simulates a two-player tank battle on a large hex grid. Tanktics has no graphics; the player moves tokens on a map using coordinates the computer, acting as referee, provided. Crawford used maps and tokens from Avalon Hill's Panzer Leader when developing the game. To compensate for the computer's weak artificial intelligence, he gave it twice as many tanks as the player and deleted U-shaped lakes from the map. There are several terrain types: forests, lakes, plains, rough and depressed ground, and also roads which allow much faster movement. There are many types of tanks—different ones for the German and Russian side each—as well as stationary anti-tank guns. At the end of the game, a point system determines whether the player has won or lost the game.

== Development ==
Crawford created the game, first called Wargy I, in FORTRAN for the IBM 1130 from May to September 1976, reporting that it defeated several experienced war gamers at a December 1976 convention. It was his first video game; he did not sell any copies, which he attributed to the IBM 1130 not being a consumer computer that war gamers would have. He ported it to a KIM-1, then the Commodore PET in December 1978. Crawford sold the PET version himself; as this version was programmed in BASIC, it was easy to port from one system to the other. By 1981, the game had been expanded and renamed into Tanktics, and was published by Avalon Hill under that name for the TRS-80, Apple II, and Atari 8-bit computers.

== Reception ==
Computer Gaming World in 1982 reported that Tanktics's computer opponent was not as intelligent as the manual claimed, advising players to give themselves "poorer tanks" once they began beating it often. While disliking how the game handled line of sight, and bugs in the Apple II version (the review offered unofficial patches for the BASIC source code), the magazine recommended it for those seeking neither arcade action nor the complexity of Avalon Hill's Panzer games or Squad Leader. A 1991 survey in the magazine of strategy and war games gave Tanktics two and a half stars out of five.
