= Typo Attack =

1982 video game

- Publisher(s): Atari Program Exchange; Atari, Inc.
- Designer(s): David Buehler
- Platform(s): Atari 8-bit
- Release: 1982: APX (disk, tape); 1984: Atari (cartridge)
- Genre(s): Typing, fixed shooter
- Mode(s): Single-player

Typo Attack is an educational typing game for Atari 8-bit computers designed to improve keyboard skill. It was written by David Buehler and published by the Atari Program Exchange in 1982. Buehler was seventeen years old when the game won the US$25,000 (equivalent to $81,500 in 2024) Atari Star Award for the best APX program of 1982. In 1984, Atari, Inc. moved Typo Attack into its official line as a cartridge.

After writing Typo Attack, Buehler had two action games published by the Atari Program Exchange in 1983: Wyzle! and Impact.

== Gameplay ==
The game takes place on a single screen, divided into multiple columns. At the bottom of each column is a letter or punctuation symbol and various enemies appear randomly at the top of the columns. Players must press the corresponding letter in a column in order to make the letter fire at the advancing enemies. If an enemy reaches the bottom of the screen they will remove part of the shield around the letter, and if it is eaten away completely the player will lose a life. Depending on the level, the letters assigned to each column will change at irregular intervals.

== Ports ==
A version was planned for the unreleased Atari CX-3000 Graduate, an add-on to turn the Atari 2600 into a home computer. Atarisoft advertised a VIC-20 version in 1984.

== Reception ==
InfoWorld's Essential Guide to Atari Computers recommended the game among educational software for the Atari 8-bit.
