= Harold Denton =

American nuclear engineer

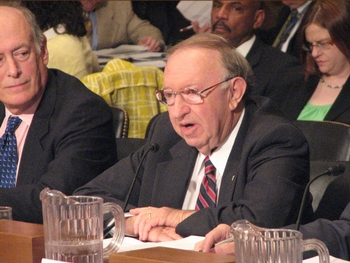
- Harold Denton testifying before the Senate Committee, March 2009
- Born: Harold Ray Denton; 24 February 1936; Rocky Mount, North Carolina, U.S.
- Died: 13 February 2017 (aged 80); Knoxville, Tennessee, U.S.
- Education: North Carolina State University College of Engineering
- Occupation: nuclear engineer
- Years active: 1958–2017
- Known for: Former Director of the Office of Nuclear Reactor Regulation
- Spouse: Lucinda Vaden Oliver
- Children: 3

Harold Ray Denton (24 February 1936 – 13 February 2017) was the Director of the Office of Nuclear Reactor Regulation at the United States Nuclear Regulatory Commission (USNRC) and is best known for his role as President Jimmy Carter's personal adviser for the Three Mile Island (TMI) accident.

After graduating in 1958 with a Bachelor of Science in nuclear engineering from North Carolina State University College of Engineering, Denton first worked at DuPont as an engineer for several years, before being hired by the USNRC. After 10 years, he became the Director of the Office of Nuclear Reactor Regulation, a position he held until his retirement in 1998.

== At Three Mile Island ==
In 1979, President Carter sent Denton to the Three Mile Island nuclear power plant in Harrisburg, as his personal representative. The arrival of Denton seemed to immediately calm the frayed nerves of public officials and stem the anger of a frustrated press corps. As reporter Steve Liddick of WCMB radio explained to writer Mark Stephens, "Harold Denton was trusted because he looked like a regular, down-to-earth kind of guy. And people wanted someone to believe."

It was Denton's task to inform Pennsylvania Governor Dick Thornburgh and the President about the discovery of a possibly explosive hydrogen bubble above the cooling water, at the top of the reactor pressure vessel. The debate over whether the bubble would mix with oxygen and set off an explosion, fueled speculation of a meltdown.

At the time of Carter's arrival on Sunday morning, on 1 April, whether the bubble would explode was still under debate. Denton informed the President of the risk just as he was preparing to enter the plant. "...I briefed the President on this bubble and the possibility of an explosive mixture and tried to give him the two sides that were out there, but we still didn't have [a] single view on that," Denton recalled.

Denton has won multiple awards for his contribution to Three Mile Island, including the James N. Landis Medal. In an interview with Dick Thornburgh concerning TMI, Thornburg said, "[Denton] proved to be a genuine hero with respect to this event. He was a much needed source of information for those of us who had the ultimate responsibility for the safety of the people in the area and the quality of the environment."

== Personal life ==
On 11 July 1959, he married Lucinda Vaden Oliver, and they subsequently had three children.

In December 2011, he participated in a symposium sponsored by the Japanese Society of Mechanical Engineers in Tokyo. This included a visit to several reactor sites damaged by the 11 March earthquake and tsunami where restoration and enhanced safety counter measures are in progress.

Denton died at his home in Knoxville, Tennessee from complications of Alzheimer's disease and chronic obstructive pulmonary disease, aged 80.
