= Atomic Safety and Licensing Board =

The Atomic Safety and Licensing Board Panel (ASLBP) is an independent adjudicatory division of the United States Nuclear Regulatory Commission, authorized under the Atomic Energy Act. The ASLBP consists of administrative judges that differ from other administrative law judges in other Federal agencies, most notably that Licensing Boards have technical judges who are experts in their relative field of study (e.g. nuclear engineering, nuclear medicine, hydrology, etc.). Licensing Boards hear claims (or contentions, as they are called) by petitioners who seek to intervene in a licensing action before the NRC. The ASLBP's jurisdiction is limited to the scope of the licensing action before the NRC, commonly outlined in the Federal Register when a licensing action is published to give notice of the pending action and calls for petitions. Licensing Boards commonly hear matters arising under the Atomic Energy Act, the National Environmental Policy Act, the National Historic Preservation Act of 1966, and the NRC's regulations in Title 10, Code of Federal Regulations. Licensing Boards hear licensing matters concerning the licensing matters of nuclear power plants, in situ leach uranium mining, spent fuel storage facilities, and enforcement matters of individuals who hold an NRC-issued license.

== Scope of authority ==
Licensing Boards conduct public hearings concerning contested issues that arise in the course of licensing and enforcement. The scope is restricted to civilian-operated nuclear reactors and the civilian use of nuclear materials . Jurisdiction is limited to civilian commercial nuclear power reactors, test and research reactors, in situ leach uranium mining, uranium milling and tailing, and spent fuel storage facilities in the United States Plants owned by U.S. firms in overseas locations are not within the purview of the Panel, nor are U.S. Department of Defense nuclear facilities or U.S. Department of Energy nuclear weapon or disposal facilities.

=== Mandate ===
The ASLBP differs from "similar federal regulatory or administrative tribunals" in that the three Board judges usually consist of one attorney (usually the board's chair) and two scientific experts. "Individuals who are directly affected by any licensing action involving a facility producing or utilizing nuclear materials can participate in a hearing..."

== Matters adjudicated ==
Matters adjudicated by the ASLBP have included: early site permits, which "banks" a site for 20 years for a company to later build a nuclear facility if they so choose; operating licenses for proposed nuclear reactors; proposed license renewals of nuclear reactors; and in situ uranium mining licensing actions. The ASLBP had also started the adjudication process on the proposed U.S. Department of Energy Yucca Mountain repository; but since 2008 Congress has not funded the project, thus not one claim (out of over 400) has been fully adjudicated in the Yucca Mountain case.

== See also ==
- Nuclear Regulatory Commission
- Office of Nuclear Reactor Regulation
- United States Department of Energy
