= De Re Atari =

1982 technical book

De Re Atari: A Guide to Effective Programming
- Author: Chris Crawford; Lane Winner; Jim Cox; Amy Chen; Jim Dunion; Kathleen Pitta; Bob Fraser
- Language: English
- Subject: Atari 8-bit computers
- Publisher: Atari Program Exchange
- Publication date: 1982
- Publication place: United States
- Pages: 250 pp

De Re Atari: A Guide to Effective Programming (Latin for "All About Atari") is a book written by Atari, Inc. employees in 1981 and published by the Atari Program Exchange in 1982 as an unbound, shrink-wrapped set of three-holed punched pages. It was one of the few non-software products sold by APX. Targeted at developers, it documents the advanced features of the Atari 8-bit computers and includes ideas for how to use them in applications. The information in the book was not available in a single, collected source at the time of publication.

The content of De Re Atari was serialized in BYTE beginning in 1981, prior to the book's publication. The release of Atari 8-bit technical details through the magazine and book quickly resulted in other sources being published, such as COMPUTE!'s First Book of Atari Graphics (1982).

Atari published official documentation for the hardware and a source listing of the operating system the same year, 1982, but they were not as easily obtainable as De Re Atari and tutorials in magazines such as COMPUTE!. Following the closure of the Atari Program Exchange in late 1984, De Re Atari went out of print.

== Background ==
Atari at first did not disclose technical information on its computers, except to software developers who agreed to keep it secret. De Re Atari ("All About Atari") was sold through the Atari Program Exchange mail-order catalog, which described the book as "everything you want to know about the Atari ... but were afraid to ask" and a resource for "professional programmers" and "advanced hobbyists who understand Atari BASIC and assembly language".

An article on Player/Missile Graphics by De Re Atari coauthor Chris Crawford appeared in Compute! in 1981 Another article by Crawford and Lane Winner appeared in the same month in BYTE. De Re Atari was serialized in BYTE in 1981 and 1982 in ten articles.

De Re Atari, and its 1981-82 serialization in BYTE, were the first public, official publication of Atari 8-bit technical information. It was based on Atari's documentation written in 1979-80 for third-party developers under non-disclosure agreements. Individual chapters are devoted to making use of the features of the platform: ANTIC and display lists, color registers, redefined character sets, player/missile graphics, the vertical blank interrupt and display list interrupts (a.k.a. raster interrupts), fine scrolling, and sound. Additional chapters cover the operating system, Atari DOS, Atari BASIC, and designing intuitive human interfaces.

Lead author Chris Crawford used many of these features in the computer wargame Eastern Front (1941) released in 1981. Another of the book's authors, Jim Dunion, used custom display lists in the DDT 6502 debugger to produce a partitioned, IDE-like display. DDT was later incorporated into the MAC/65 assembler.

== Reception ==
De Re Atari was successful; the manager of APX later said that it and Eastern Front "paid the bills, i.e. were our biggest sellers". Mapping the Atari described De Re Atari as "an arcane, but indispensable reference to the Atari's operations and some of its most impressive aspects". The Addison-Wesley Book of Atari Software 1984 stated that the book had "a wealth of information, but tends to be obscure and includes numerous errors". Hardware designer Joe Decuir recommended De Re Atari to those writing Atari software.
