= Atari Program Exchange =

Video game publisher

Atari Program Exchange (APX) was a division of Atari, Inc. that sold software via mail-order for Atari 8-bit computers from 1981 until 1984. Quarterly APX catalogs were sent to all registered Atari 8-bit owners. APX encouraged any programmer, not just professionals, to submit video games, educational software, applications, and utilities. A few internally developed Atari products were sold through APX, such as Atari Pascal, the developer handbook De Re Atari, and a port of the arcade video game Kangaroo.

If accepted, a submitted program was added to the catalog with credit given to the programmer. The top submissions of the quarter in each category were recognized. One program each year received the top honor: the Atari Star award. It was given to My First Alphabet in 1981, Typo Attack in 1982, and the video game Getaway! in 1983. Typo Attack and two other releases, Eastern Front (1941) and Caverns of Mars, were moved into Atari's official product line as ROM cartridges.

The brainchild of Dale Yocum, the Atari Program Exchange started in February 1981. In 1982 its management was taken over by Fred Thorlin, who operated it until it closed. APX published quarterly catalogs until 1984, when new Atari CEO James J. Morgan closed down the mail-order division. Some APX software was later picked up by Antic Software and branded as "APX Classics".

== History ==
When Atari first launched the Atari 8-bit computers in late 1979, the company kept most of the hardware details secret. It intended to be the primary supplier of software for the platform, as had been the case with the Atari Video Computer System console. By the end of the first year on the market increasingly sophisticated applications from outside Atari were nonetheless becoming available. There were, however, a limited number of distribution channels at the time.

Dale Yocum approached Atari with the idea of setting up their own third-party publishing arm. With Atari's distribution capabilities the products would be seen by many more prospective customers, and at the same time, Atari would make money with every sale, money that would otherwise be lost. Chris Crawford later stated:

The guy who cooked up the idea, Dale Yocum, was trying to explain to the management that there are a lot people out there that like to write programs and if we can publish these programs for them, it's a win-win. He put together a business plan for it and said 'Look, we only need a little bit of money and this thing can be self sufficient and it might make some money.' They grudgingly agreed to let him do it because the Atari platform desperately needed a larger software base, a void not being filled by the other publishers of the day. And so he did it and very quickly made it into a monster success. It was a major profit center for Atari. They rewarded Dale for his initiative by bringing in another guy to be Dale's boss... so Dale, in disgust, transferred to the new Atari Research Division under Alan Kay about a year after APX launched.

=== Catalogs ===
Atari mailed catalogs to all computer owners who sent in warranty cards. The first issue of the catalog, Summer 1981, stated:

Atari offers a wide variety of useful and entertaining software ... we've come across other interesting software deserving public recognition ... [APX] will make such software available quickly and inexpensively ... We'll keep costs down [by using] simple packaging and we'll rely on user-written documentation ... What we'll offer, then, is a lot of interesting software quickly and inexpensively.

The quarterly publication included descriptions and screenshots of each program, and advertisements for computer magazines. Many APX programs were games, but it also distributed applications, utilities, programming tools, and educational software. A few non-software products were also sold: the book De Re Atari, ports and connectors for the Atari 8-bit line, a kit to expand the Atari 400 to 48K, and a cartridge with EPROM sockets.

=== Discontinuation ===
According to Atari CEO James Morgan, APX was losing money in its mail-order business so that part was shut down:

Moreover, Atari had to come to grips with the fact that Atari is not in the mail-order business. However, APX will continue to review products sent to Atari by outside programmers. If the programs are topnotch, they will be added to the main Atari catalogue. Otherwise, they will not be sold by Atari in any fashion.

The final catalog, dated Winter 1983–84, was much smaller than previous catalogs. After the discontinuation of APX, Antic magazine published some former APX titles, such as the games Galahad and the Holy Grail and Dandy, as "APX Classics from Antic". Antic continued soliciting new submissions as Antic Software. The Antic Software catalog was bound into issues of the magazine and later included Atari ST products.

== Products ==
=== Atari Star winners ===
In 1981 APX announced an award program, the Atari Star, with quarterly and yearly cash awards. All programs submitted for publishing were eligible. The annual grand prize for the best program was a trophy and $25,000. The first winner was the educational game My First Alphabet by Fernando Herrera. He used the money to cofound video game developer and publisher First Star Software which sold several of his games, including Astro Chase and Bristles.

The 1982 winner was Typo Attack by David Buehler, a game designed to improve touch typing skill. Atari published it as a cartridge in 1984.

The 1983 winner was Getaway! by Mark Reid, a maze chase game taking place across a large, scrolling city map. According to Reid, there was talk of moving the game into Atari's product line, but Atari's troubles stemming from the video game crash of 1983 kept this from happening.

=== Other games ===
Wargame Eastern Front (1941), written by Chris Crawford, was the Atari Program Exchange's most popular program. The source code for Eastern Front, and a scenario editor, were sold separately. Eastern Front and vertically scrolling shooter Caverns of Mars were both converted to ROM cartridges and became part of the official Atari product line. One of Crawford's later games, Excalibur, was also sold through APX.

John Palevich's Dandy was the direct inspiration for the 1985 arcade video game Gauntlet and became the Atari 8-bit and Atari 7800 game Dark Chambers.

Salmon Run was the first game developed by Bill Williams. A VIC-20 port was later sold by Synapse Software.

Atari distributed two licensed arcade ports through APX: 1978's Avalanche, credited to Dennis Koble who wrote the original arcade game, and 1982 platform game Kangaroo, which was uncredited.

=== Developer tools ===
The book De Re Atari: A Guide to Effective Programming (1982) was the first time Atari widely published information about the internals of the Atari 8-bit computers. It was serialized in BYTE prior to publication, then sold through APX as loose pages intended to be put in a three-ring binder.

Dunion's Debugging tool, or DDT, is a machine language debugger which was later incorporated into the MAC/65 assembler from Optimized Systems Software. The author, Jim Dunion, contributed to De Re Atari.

The Atari Pascal Language System is a version of the Pascal programming language designed for an unreleased, higher-spec Atari computer model. It was relegated to the Atari Program Exchange and sold without support. The software requires two floppy drives which greatly reduced its audience.

Dandy author Jack Palevich ported Small-C to the Atari 8-bit computers which was published by APX as Deep Blue C. The source code was sold separately as Deep Blue Secrets.
