= Balance of Power (play-by-mail game) =

1980s science fiction play-by-mail wargame

- Designers: Tundra Games
- Publishers: Jolly Goblin Games (Canada), Whitegold Games (UK), Yellowseed Games (Canada)
- Genres: play-by-mail, wargame
- Languages: English
- Systems: computer and hand moderated
- Players: 20
- Playing time: closed ended
- Materials required: Instructions, order sheets, turn results, paper, pencil
- Media type: Play-by-mail

Balance of Power (or BOP) is a closed-end and mixed-moderated play by mail (PBM) wargame. It was published by Jolly Goblin Games in Canada and Whitegold Games in the United Kingdom. Twenty players competed in this moderately complicated game to control a third of the game map. Technology was pre-World War I era. The game received generally positive reviews in various publications in the 1980s.

== Development ==
Balance of Power was a closed-ended wargame. It was designed by Tundra Games of Canada. In a 1987 issue of Gaming Universal, Tundra Games stated that it was looking for a buyer for the game. In 1989, it was published by Jolly Goblin Games of Canada. Whitegold Games ran the game in the United Kingdom and it was briefly licensed in Australia. In a 1992 issue of Paper Mayhem, Yellowseed Games of Canada announced that it was becoming a game licensee, reintroducing it to North America.

== Gameplay ==
Balance of Power was moderately complex and mixed moderated—computer moderated with human input. Twenty players vied for control of one-third of the production points on the game map, comprising 3500 hexes on a single continent. Economics and diplomacy were key factors. Gameplay was akin to board wargames.

The technology level was pre-World War I with "spotter planes, balloons, cavalry, [and] artillery" as examples. The earliest player defeat by 1989 was in turn 3.

== Reception ==
In a 1989 issue of Paper Mayhem, reviewer Byron Fast described the game as interesting and a "good choice" for various players while noting the rulebook and game moderation as detractors. Paul King reviewed Balance of Power in 1990, providing a generally positive review, noting it "works well and has some good and original features. Definitely worth considering". The game placed third in the non-fantasy wargame category in Flagship's Summer 1990 Award Winners. (Note: The game placed after Crisis II and Domination.)

== See also ==
- List of play-by-mail games

== Bibliography ==
- Editors (Summer 1987). "The Spokesmen Speak: Balance of Power". Flagship. No. 7 (US ed.). p. 30.
- Fast, Byron (November–December 1989). "Balance of Power". Paper Mayhem. No. 39. p. 47.
- Kavanaugh, Brendon (September 1988). "Balance of Power". Crash.
- King, Paul (May 1990). "Balance of Power: Medium Price, Fair Value". Flagship. No. 26 (US ed.). pp. 29–31.
- Tabor, Al; Palmer, Nikky (May 1990). "Summer 1990 Award Winners". Flagship. No. 26 (US ed.). pp. 20–21.
- Tundra Games (June–July 1987). "Balance of Power". Gaming Universal. No. 5. p. 28.
- Yellowseed Games (March–April 1992). "Gameline: Yellowseed Games". Paper Mayhem. No. 53. pp. 21–30.
