= Balance of the Planet =

1990 video game

- Developer(s): Chris Crawford (Mac); Incredible Technologies (MS-DOS)
- Publisher(s): Chris Crawford
- Designer(s): Chris Crawford
- Platform(s): Macintosh, MS-DOS, PC-98
- Release: 1990
- Genre(s): Simulation

Balance of the Planet is a simulation video game developed by Chris Crawford. He self-published it in 1990 for Macintosh. It was ported to MS-DOS and PC-98.

== Development ==
Chris Crawford was approached in early 1989 by Epyx's Joe Miller about working on an environmental game to coincide with the film Voice of the Planet to be released for Earth Day in 1990. While wary of licensed games, he developed a design concept that explored the intricate connections between ecological and economic factors. He created a hypertext system to house his game. In order to place values into the game (e.g. whether the economic value of a factory is worth the deaths from air pollution), Crawford was forced to place a value on human life; he spent a lot of time treading on eggshells before conceding that no matter what value-based decisions he made he would be accused of bias. Crawford designed the title as a serious game; to be very educational but not necessarily a lot of fun. He self-published the game in April 1990. Incredible Technologies ported the game to MS-DOS from the original Macintosh version.

== Gameplay ==
Balance of the Planet sees the player balance global economic and ecological forces through taxation and expenditure, with each policy change having a runoff effect to other areas. For instance, clearing forests changes the level of CO_{2} in the air, which affects global warming. The game has a procedural system with limited user interaction. Crawford notes that it is difficult to "win" level one due to the state the planet is already in.

== Reception ==
Chris Lombardi reviewed the game for Computer Gaming World, and stated that "I respect the designer for having the courage to risk everything for his convictions. Still, if the game is not fun, it simply wouldn't be right to endorse it for gamers who expect to be entertained by their entertainment software."

In the July 1990 edition of The Games Machine, the reviewer thought the game would be perfect to play in schools and colleges due to being educational, easy to use, and quick to play.

In the July 1990 edition of Games International (Issue 16), Brian Walker liked the tone of the game, commenting, "The stylised messages on each screen advising of all the nasties around us are superbly rendered while the content strikes just the right note: neither hectoring or patronising." He did find "heavy-handed humour in the manual gets to be a bit wearing but otherwise it is a fine and comprehensive effort." Walker concluded by giving the game above average ratings of 8 out of 10 for both gameplay and graphics, saying, "You'd have to be a right plonker not to find Balance of the Planet fascinating in some way."

In the November 1990 edition of Macworld, Tom Moran noted the serious nature of the game, stating that "the results are rather grim ... you'll get some improvements in the state of the ecology, but you'll most likely get the soul-shivering message that millions have starved to death during your administration." They noted that Balance of the Planet contains some interesting information in regards to ecology, but criticized its "uninteresting interface" and "too little information on how the simulation works", remarking that "[t]he most obvious way to find out the gross effects of any of the more than 20 variables is to slog it out with the empirical method: change only one variable to its maximum value, step through all nine stages of the game, note the results, start over, change the same variable to its minimum value, and repeat the process." Macworld was frustrated by this trial and error tedium to discern the meaning behind the manipulatable variables.

In the January 1991 edition of Compute!, Richard O. Mann wrote that the game offered a challenging, intellectual, effective, and thoughtful consideration of the "ultimate puzzle" that world leaders face on a day-to-day basis.

In December 1991 edition of Environmental History Review, Dan Holder appreciated that the title challenged the common desire for people to find simple solutions to complex problems.

In a retrospective reviews in the 2010 book Persuasive Games: The Expressive Power of Videogames, Ian Bogost felt the game was sophisticated, complex, and expressive.

== Legacy ==
In 2012, Crawford created a Kickstarter project for a remake of Balance of the Planet, which would be made free on the internet. He did not take into account that donors would be wary to pay for a project that might never be released or fall way behind schedule. For this reason, he stated that Balance of the Planet's Kickstarter became a dismal failure. 264 backers pledged a total of $13,594 out of a $150,000 fund goal.
