= Eastern Front (1941) =

1981 video game

- Cartridge version box cover
- Developer: Chris Crawford
- Publishers: Atari Program Exchange; Atari, Inc.
- Platform: Atari 8-bit
- Release: August 1981: APX; 1982: Atari
- Genres: Computer wargame, Turn-based strategy
- Mode: Single-player

Eastern Front (1941) is a computer wargame for Atari 8-bit computers created by Chris Crawford and published through the Atari Program Exchange (APX) in 1981. A scenario editor and assembly language source code for the game were also sold by APX as separate products.

Recreating the Eastern Front during World War II, Eastern Front covers the historical area of operations during 1941–1942. The player commands German units at the corps level as they invade the Soviet Union in 1941 and fight the computer-controlled Russians. The game simulates terrain, weather, supplies, unit morale, and fatigue.

A killer app for Atari computers, Eastern Front was among APX's best selling games, selling over 60,000 copies. It was widely lauded in the press and was Creative Computing's Game of the Year in 1981. In 1982, it was licensed by Atari for distribution on game cartridge, then rereleased in 1988 in XEGS styled packaging.

== Gameplay ==
Opening scene in the APX version, showing the region around Leningrad

Eastern Front is a corps-level simulation of the first 41 weeks of Operation Barbarossa, the German invasion of the Soviet Union in 1941. The player controls the Germans, in white, while the computer plays the Russians, in red. Units are represented as boxes for armored corps or cavalry, and crosses for infantry, an attempt to replicate conventional military symbols given the low resolution.

The playfield is 2 1/3 screens wide, 4 1/3 screens tall, and uses 18 colors. The screen shows only 1/9 of the entire map at one time, smooth-scrolling around it when the joystick-controlled cursor reaches the edges of the screen. According to creator Chris Crawford, it is the first wargame with a smooth-scrolling map. The map covers the area from just north of Leningrad at the top to Sevastopol at the bottom, and from Warsaw on the left to just east of Stalingrad on the right. The terrain is varied, including flatland, forests, mountains, rivers and swamps, each with their own effects on movement. Cities are displayed in white, and are a major source of "victory points", the player's score.

The game is modal, switching between an order entry mode and a combat mode. During order entry the joystick is used to select units and enter movement in the four cardinal directions. Up to eight orders can be entered for any unit. Orders are remembered from turn to turn, and new orders can be added in future turns after watching an animation of any remaining ones. The orders for any given unit can be cancelled by pressing the space bar.

After entering orders, the combat phase begins with Start. Units attempt to follow their orders to the greatest extent possible, delayed by terrain, blocking friendly units, or combat with enemy units. The screen shows combat by flashing the "attacked" unit, which might be forced to retreat, or be destroyed outright. When all possible movement and combat is exhausted, the game returns to the order-entry phase. Each turn represents one week in-game time, and the game ends on 29 March 1942, after 41 turns. The game engine includes a number of features that increases the depth of the simulation compared to contemporary wargames, such as zones of control, which allows front lines to be constructed without requiring contiguous lines of units. This includes muster and combat strengths, which simulates losses due to combat, and reinforcements that slowly returns a unit to muster strength over time. Supply lines are also simulated, and surrounding the enemy to cut off their supplies is an important strategy for the human player, who faces an overwhelming enemy numerical superiority.

The game simulates the changing of the seasons: 14 turns of summer that begin in June 1941, four turns of autumn, and 22 turns of winter. When autumn begins on 5 October 1941 and the green land changes to purple-brown mud, the player is likely losing if they have not captured most objectives, destroyed most early Russian forces, and established a defensive position.

Victory points are scored by moving German forces east, capturing Moscow, Leningrad, Stalingrad, and Sevastopol, and destroying and pushing Russian forces east. The highest possible score is 255, and the documentation suggests that any score above 100 is good. Computer Gaming World estimated that the actual German army in 1941 scored 110 to 120. A high score by early autumn is not difficult but keeping it high during winter is almost impossible, as mud and snow appears, rivers and land gradually freeze during winter, and Russians counterattack; until the spring thaw the German side is forced into a purely defensive role. If the player survives until spring the season offers a renewed offensive capability, but only for a short period before the game ends.

=== Artificial intelligence ===
In an example of pondering, the computer AI calculates its moves during the period between vertical blank interrupts (VBI). The rest of the game, what the user sees, is run during the VBI period of a few hundred cycles. According to Crawford in Chris Crawford on Game Design, the system starts with a basic "plan" and then applies any available cycles to trying variations on that plan, selecting higher-valued outcomes. A few thousand cycles are available between each VBI, so given a typical order-entry phase of a minute, the computer has millions of cycles to spend on refining its plan.

The AI is based on three basic measures of the game state: The strategic situation which attempts to take and hold cities, the tactical situation which attempts to block player movements, and the overall arrangement of the front line. The AI first attempts to build a continuous front line in an attempt to prevent encirclements, it then sends additional units on intercept courses to block player movements, and finally any remaining units are sent to undefended cities.

As Germany, the player begins with more-mobile units, shorter supply lines, and concentrated forces. Although the AI is not strong—believing that the computer needed help against a human, Crawford intentionally did not fix a bug that benefits the Russian side—the computer has greater numbers, much more territory, and winter weather. Because of iterative pondering, the computer's moves become better the longer the player waits before issuing orders each turn, and a tactic that works well in one game might be less effective in another. The computer's larger forces allow it to put up a credible defense; direct fights are hopeless for the player, as newly arriving Soviet units eventually overwhelm the German forces. Crawford spent much time tuning the arrival times of new units to balance the gameplay, and warned that a player who attempted to overwhelm the Russians with tanks is "guaranteed to lose. What you are supposed to do is maneuver, encircle, demoralize, and defeat". The manual advises using blitzkrieg: Use mobile armored units to break through and encircle Russian units, and infantry units to eliminate enemy pockets.

According to Crawford, Eastern Front is an example of a game with a sharp jump in the learning curve; "apparently there is just one trick in the game, mastery of which guarantees mastery of the game". While he did not specify the trick, there are ways to trick the AI. One is to break the German forces into two blocks, and then advance them on alternate turns. The tactical part of the AI attempts to intercept these movements, sending its mobile forces first one way, then the other, never actually making contact. Another strategy is to keep flanking forces behind a spearhead, which the AI would attempt to block. This results in the computer forces clumping up in front of the Germans, allowing the wings to move in once motion was difficult.

Players exploited another bug in the first version's game engine. Since the AI calculates its moves while the user enters orders, reducing the amount of time the user takes to plan their own moves reduces the quality of the computer response. Repeatedly pressing Start prevents the computer from pondering and neither the player nor computer does anything, avoiding combat during the winter and allowing the player to break out during spring with full-strength units.

== Development ==
After writing Tanktics, which simulated German and Soviet tank battles during World War II, Crawford wrote the first version of what he called Ourrah Pobieda (Russian for "Horray, Victory!") in May and June 1979 on a Commodore PET using Commodore BASIC. The game was at the time a division-level simulation of combat on the Eastern Front. He described the initial version as "dull, confusing, and slow", and did not return to the project for 15 months. After he began working for Atari, in September 1980 he saw a fellow employee demonstrate smooth scrolling in a text window on an Atari 8-bit and realized the technique's potential for a war game. By December he produced a smoothly scrolling map of Russia, in January 1981 produced a written description of the design for what he by now envisioned as a "48K disk-based game with fabulous graphics" written in assembly language, and began working 20 hours a week during nights and weekends to produce a demonstrable game by the Origins Convention in July.

Crawford first playtested the game in May and again found it disappointing. To simplify the project, he reduced the game's scope from the entire 1941–1945 campaign to just the first year; introduced zones of control to reduce the number of units and the burden on the computer's artificial intelligence; and added logistics, which permitted encirclement. Crawford also found that the game fit into 16K RAM instead of 48K, and maintained the size. He distributed the game to other playtesters in June, demonstrated a playable version at Origins, then further refined the game for six weeks by fixing bugs and adjusting game balance. Crawford estimated in 1987 that he had worked a total of 800 hours on Eastern Front, and believed that the game had influenced the industry to simplify user interfaces and prove that there was a market for an "intelligent", non-action game. He was reportedly most proud of the iterative pondering, and stated that Eastern Front only uses 75% of Atari 8-bit graphic capabilities.

Crawford approached Atari about selling the game, but the company believed that wargames for Atari computers would not be popular.

Starting position for the 1942 scenario. The Russians have contained the Germans southwest of Moscow. Smolensk is centered just above the pink square cursor, with Minsk on the left and Orel in the lower right. A Russian infantry unit covers Moscow near the upper edge of the map.

== Release ==
Atari Program Exchange (APX), a separate Atari unit that distributed third-party applications, published it on disk and tape. Renamed Eastern Front shortly before release, APX began selling the game in August 1981. It was immediately successful, selling over 60,000 copies with US$40,000 (equivalent to $141,654 in 2025) in royalties to Crawford. By June 1982 it was APX's best seller; APX's manager later said that Eastern Front and De Re Atari "paid the bills, i.e. were our biggest sellers". Crawford stated in 1987 that the game had been the most lucrative for him "by at least a factor of four", and in 1992 that it had sold "fabulously well—far better than anybody (myself included) expected", with most purchasers not traditional wargamers.

The game was so successful that Atari asked Crawford to convert it to ROM cartridge as an official Atari product. To improve the gameplay he revamped the AI code, and eliminated the ability to "fast forward" the game and avoid combat. Five difficulty levels are added, the "learner" mode with a single German unit in order to teach the user how to use the controls, and each level above that adding more units up to "advanced", which is identical to the original game. In the highest level, "expert", air force corps (Fliegercorp) are added, and the units can be placed in one of several modes; normal, assault, or defend and move. In "expert" the user can also choose to start in either 1941 with the standard opening, or 1942, with fully developed lines deep within Russia. The new version also adds the ability to save and restore games, colored cities to indicate ownership, and added city names (previously visible only in the manual) to the in-game map.

== Reception ==
Reception

Review scores
Publication	Score
Computer Gaming World	4/5
ANALOG Computing	9.3/10
InfoWorld	Excellent
Addison-Wesley	A

Awards
Publication	Award
Creative Computing	Game of the Year, 1981
Academy of Adventure Gaming Arts and Design	Best Adventure Game for Home Computer, 1981
Charles S. Roberts Award	Best Adventure Game for Home Computer of 1981

Eastern Front received critical praise from contemporary magazines. Computer Gaming World in 1981 called it "to this date, the most impressive computer wargame on the market". The review praised the graphics and the artificial intelligence, noted its pondering, and suggested that the game was a killer app for Atari computers. Six years later the magazine still rated the game five out of five points, stating "obsolete by contemporary programming standards, it is still fun to play", and in 1993 rated the game four stars out of five.

Creative Computing called Eastern Front "one of the very best war games available for a personal computer ... nearly every aspect of the game is a technical masterpiece", praising its artificial intelligence and "magnificent" scrolling map. The magazine concluded that it was "also a virtuoso demonstration of the awesome built-in capabilities of the Atari computer. This game literally could not be done on any other computer in as satisfactory an execution". Atari magazine Antic called Eastern Front "a game master piece, a brilliant simulation of battle conditions on the eastern front in WW II." ANALOG Computing rated the game 9.3 out of 10, calling it "truly magnificent". Citing time pressure as a difference from board games, COMPUTE! called Eastern Front "a paradigm for computer war games" and praised its graphics and gameplay, with the only major criticism being the inability to save and restore a game. InfoWorld rated it "Excellent" overall in December 1981, and later referred to it as one of "the deepest computer games around." InfoWorld's Essential Guide to Atari Computers recommended the game as "the first good" simulation game for the Atari 8-bit. The book cited Crawford as foreseeing that a computer could completely replace a board game and human opponent, and agreed that it caused people to buy Atari computers. BYTE stated that Eastern Front "is possibly the first fun war game for people who hate war games". The Addison-Wesley Book of Atari Software 1984 gave the game an overall A rating, calling it "perhaps the best-designed computer war game to appear on any microcomputer to date" and praising the graphics and joystick-driven user interface. The book concluded that it "is the first war game that non-warriors might enjoy ... Highly recommended."

Creative Computing named Eastern Front Game of the Year in 1981. The Academy of Adventure Gaming Arts and Design named it Best Adventure Game for Home Computer, 1981. In 1987 Crawford stated that it was one of the three games he was proud of, with Legionnaire and Balance of Power. In 2002 GameSpy wrote that Eastern Front was considered to be one of the first computer wargames that paper-and-pencil wargamers approved of.

== Legacy ==
While the game was still being sold, Crawford released its source code through APX as a separate, commercial product targeted at developers. He was surprised that while it sold well, no other game used it. He also released a scenario editor, but only one pre-packaged set of user-created scenarios is known.

Crawford used many of the ideas from Eastern Front in Legionnaire for Avalon Hill in 1982. Legionnaire uses the same map engine to simulate the Roman legions fighting the barbarians, but modifies it to move units in real time.

In 2013 Crawford publicly released the source code of several of his games, including Eastern Front.
