= Office of Nuclear Reactor Regulation =

The Office of Nuclear Reactor Regulation, is a subordinate part of the United States Nuclear Regulatory Commission.

The office should not be confused with the NRC's Nuclear Regulatory Research. The office's current director is William Dean. It has deputy directorates for two areas: (1) Reactor Safety Programs and (2) Engineering and Corporate Support. It has program management, policy development and analysis staff as well as an array of divisions.

The Office of Nuclear Reactor Regulation is responsible for ensuring the public health and safety through licensing and inspection activities at commercial nuclear power plants. However, the evaluation of license renewal applications is conducted by its Division of License Renewal. Of current interest to the public and elected officials is the proposed renewal license for the Diablo Canyon Power Plant, which is also sometimes referred to as the Diablo Canyon Nuclear Power Plant. According to Victor Dricks, senior public affairs officer for NRC Region IV, the NRC recently conducted a review of the over 100 nuclear power plants in the United States, including Diablo Canyon, and the "found a high level of preparedness and strong capability in terms of equipment and procedures to respond to severe events..."

== Scope of authority ==
The office is in charge of nuclear reactor safety for the United States Nuclear Regulatory Commission. Its mandate includes four main areas:

- Rulemaking
- Licensing
- Oversight
- Incident response team

== Jurisdiction ==
- Commercial nuclear power reactors
- Test and research reactors

== Mandate ==
The office is charged with the priorities to protect the public health, safety, and the environment. It frequently works in conjunction with the NRC regional organizational structure and other task focused offices for these purposes. It works with the regions and other offices to accomplish its mission and contribute to the agency mission.

== Divisions ==
- Safety Systems
- Component Integrity
- Engineering
- Risk Assessment
- License Renewal
- Operating Reactor Licensing
- Inspection and Regional Support
- Policy and Rulemaking

== Reorganization ==
In 1999, the office underwent reorganization under the aegis of the then-Director Samuel J. Collins.

== Role during Three Mile Island accident ==
In 1979, the Office of Nuclear Reactor Regulation played a key role in the Three Mile Island accident that occurred in Pennsylvania. The office's director at the time, Harold Denton, personally advised President Jimmy Carter throughout the crisis. This direct liaison is notable in that it was NRC Chairman Joseph Hendrie, Denton's superior, who interacted with Pennsylvania's governor Dick Thornburgh. This event provoked considerable public interest that coincided with release of the film The China Syndrome, galvanizing public opinion on nuclear policy in the United States. Given this context, President Carter was advised to walk into the crisis zone in person in order to demonstrate that the dangers were not as high as many believed. These events occurred at approximately the same time as the beginning of the J. Samuel Walker term of service as the official historian of the NRC and are documented by him in Three Mile Island: A Nuclear Crisis in Historical Perspective.

== See also ==
- Atomic Safety and Licensing Board
- Nuclear safety
- Nuclear safety in the United States
- Nuclear policy in the United States
- Nuclear Accident Response Organisation
- Nuclear energy policy in the United States
- United States Nuclear Regulatory Commission
