= Video game genre =

Classification assigned to video games based on their gameplay

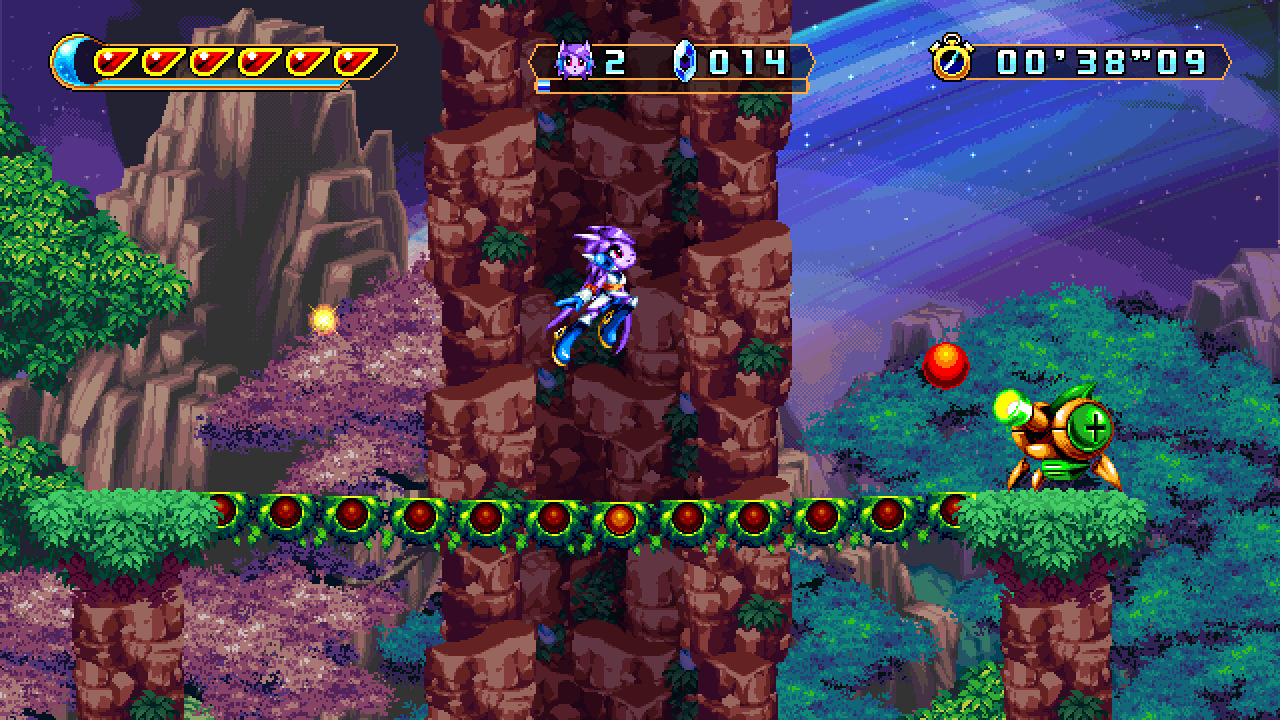
Freedom Planet 2, a platformer

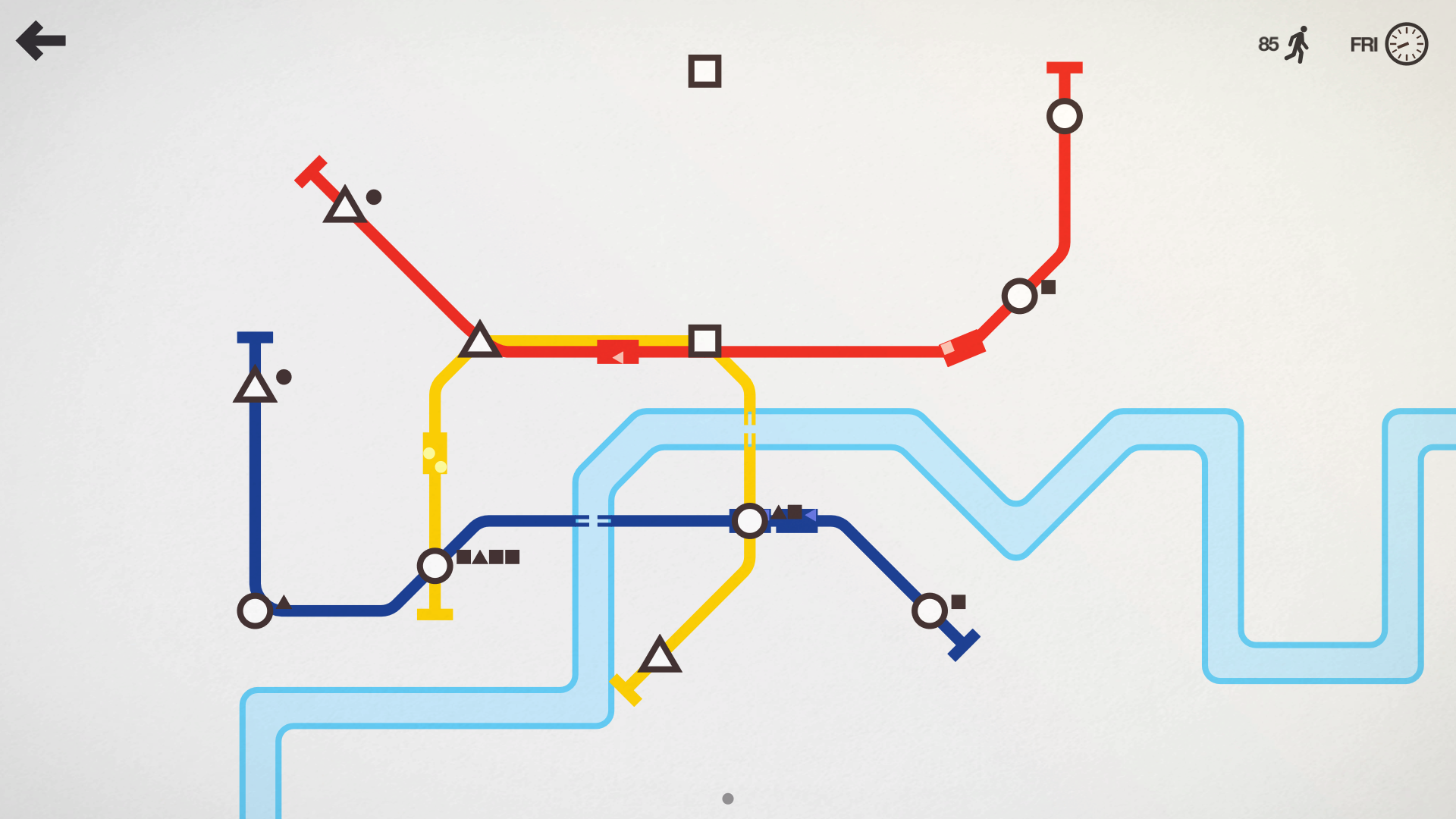
Mini Metro, a puzzle video game

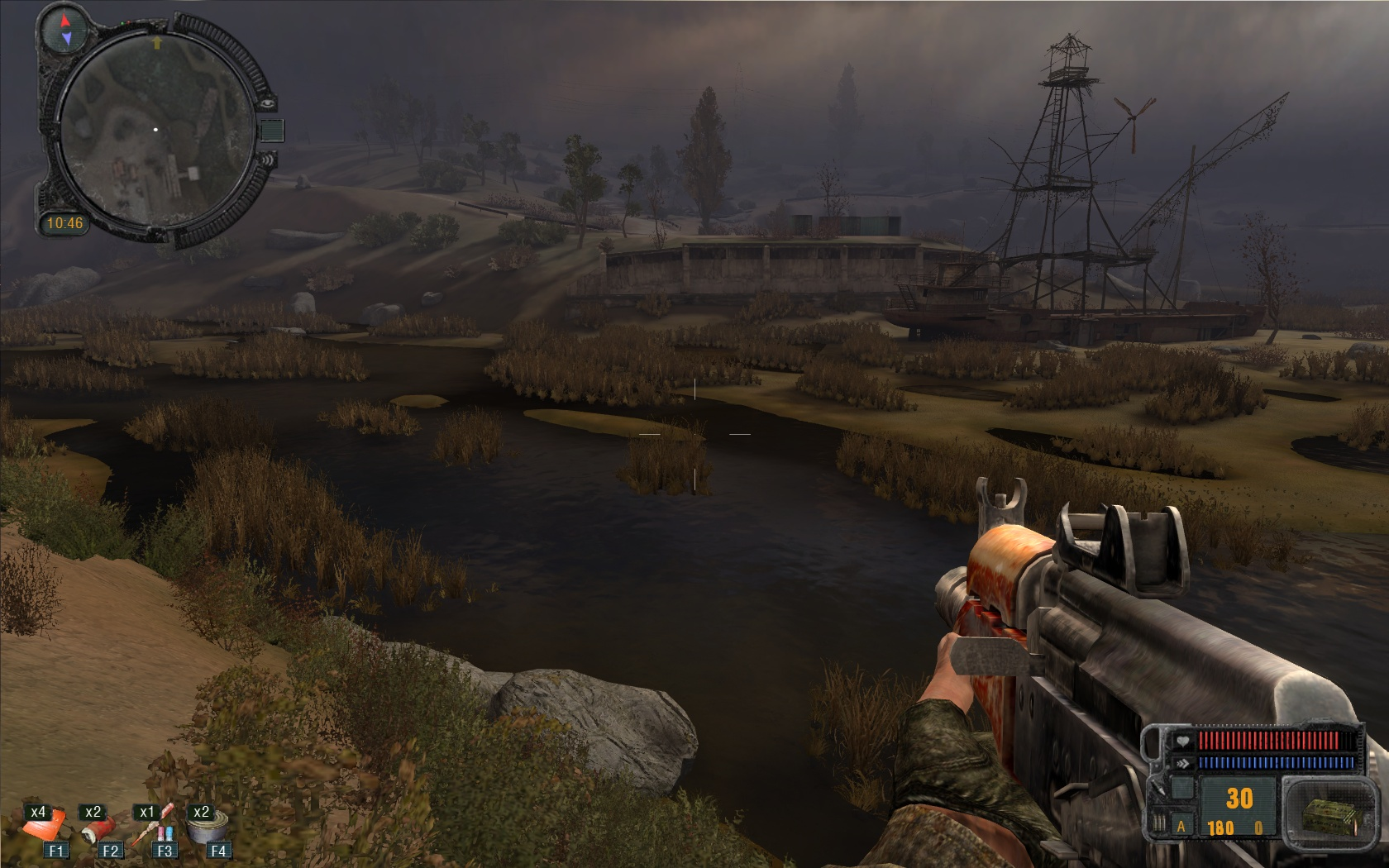
S.T.A.L.K.E.R.: Call of Pripyat, a first-person shooter

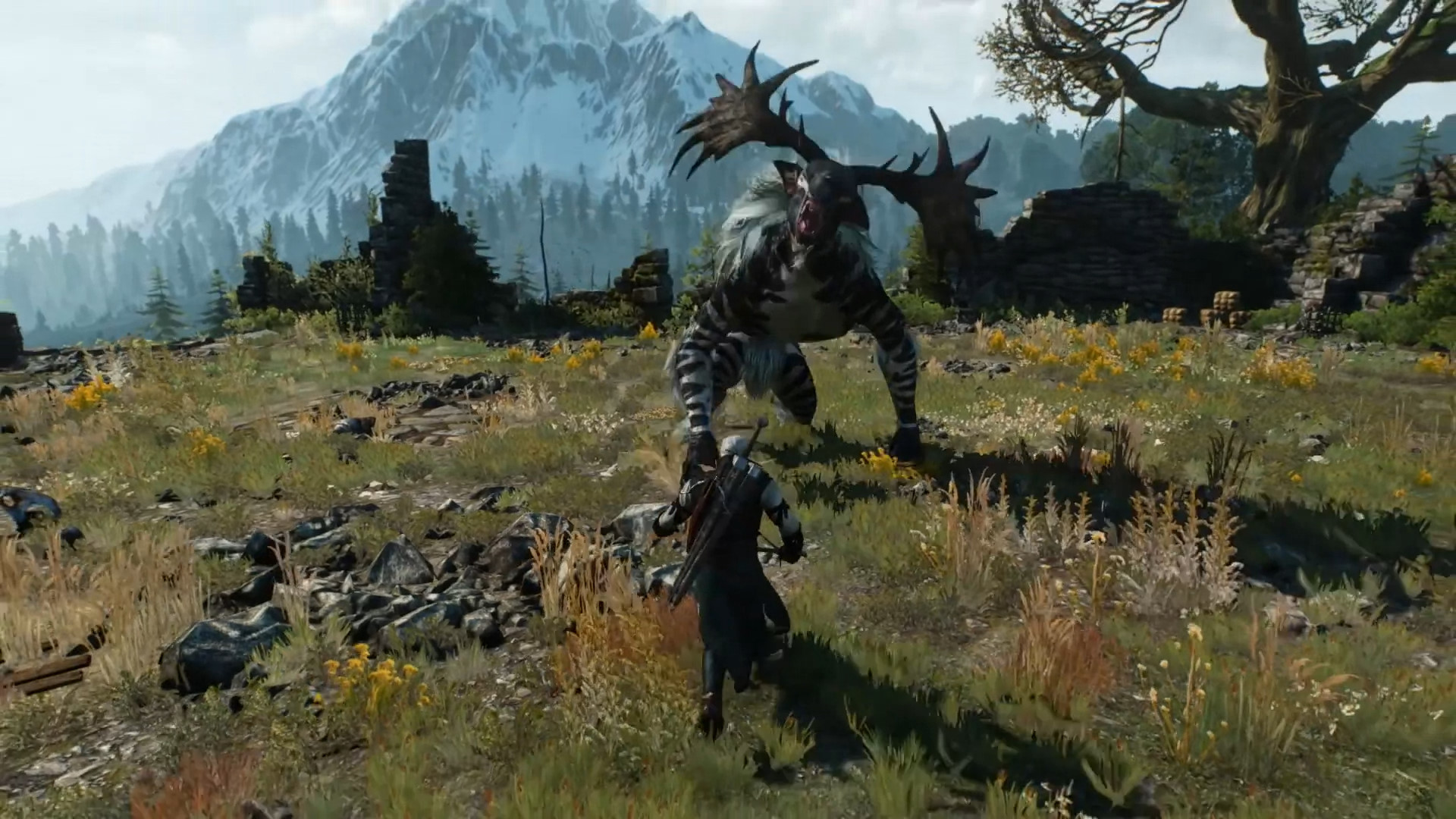
The Witcher 3: Wild Hunt, a role-playing video game

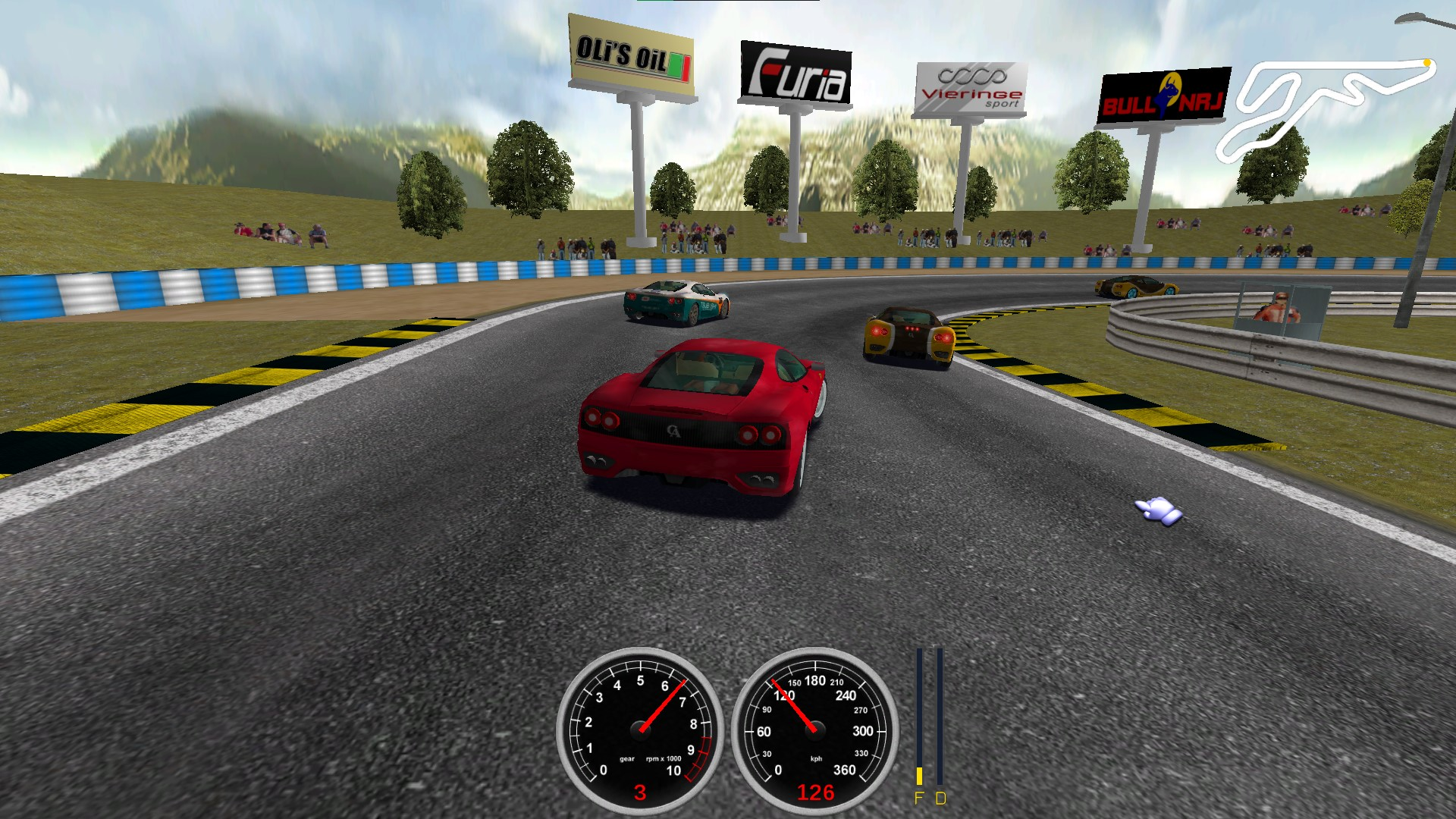
Speed Dreams, a racing video game

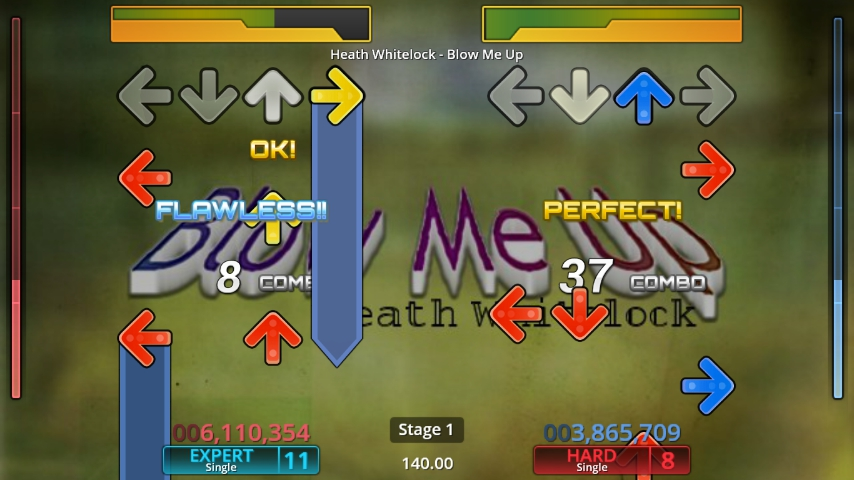
StepMania, a rhythm game

A video game genre is an informal classification of a video game based on how it is played rather than visual or narrative elements. This is independent of setting, unlike works of fiction that are expressed through other media, such as films or books. For example, a shooter game is still a shooter game, or a puzzle game is still a puzzle game, regardless of where or when it takes place. A specific game's genre is open to subjective interpretation. An individual game may belong to several genres at once.

== History ==
Early attempts at categorizing video games were primarily for organizing catalogs and books. A 1981 catalog for the Atari Video Computer System uses 8 headings: Skill Gallery, Space Station, Classics Corner, Adventure Territory, Race Track, Sports Arena, Combat Zone, and Learning Center. ("Classics", in this case, refers to chess and checkers.) In Tom Hirschfeld's 1981 book How to Master the Video Games, he divides the games into broad categories in the table of contents: Space Invaders-type, Asteroids-type, maze, reflex, and miscellaneous. The first two of these correspond to the still-used genres of fixed shooter and multidirectional shooter.

For home computers, two publications established a small number of categories based on the best-selling software in the early 1980s: Softalk, which ran its Top Thirty list from 1980 to 1984 with the genres of strategy, adventure, fantasy and arcade; and Computer Gaming World, which collected user-submitted rankings. Computer Gaming World initially used three categories in 1981—arcade, wargame, and adventure—but by 1989 had expanded its genre list to strategy, simulation, adventure, role-playing adventure, wargame, and action/arcade.

Chris Crawford attempted to classify video games in his 1984 book The Art of Computer Game Design. Crawford focused on the player's experience and activities required for gameplay. He wrote, "the state of computer game design is changing quickly. We would therefore expect the taxonomy presented [in this book] to become obsolete or inadequate in a short time."

Nintendo, in bringing its Family Computer system into the North American market as the Nintendo Entertainment System in 1985, looked to avoid the issues with loss of publishing control that had led to the video game crash of 1983 and to prevent unauthorized games for the system. To solve this, Nintendo required approval of all games for the NES. To support this, Nintendo classified games into eight major series: Adventure, Action, Sports, Light-Gun, Programmable, Arcade, Robot, and Educational. The series description appeared on early "black box" covers and subsequently in the NES Player's Guide. By the time of the Game Boy and Super NES, Nintendo had retired the Arcade, Light-Gun, Robot, Programmable, and Educational series, but added RPG & Simulation and Puzzle.

Consoles manufacturers that followed the NES followed similar behavior in requiring licenses to develop games for their systems. To assure they would get these licenses, console developers tended to stay with gameplay of previously published games for that console, thus causing groups of games within the same genre to grow. Subsequently, retailers displayed games grouped by genres, and market research firms found that players had preferences for certain types over others, based on region, and developers could plan out future strategies through this.

With the industry expanding in the 1990s and budgets for video games began growing, large publishers like Electronic Arts began to form to handle the marketing and publication of games, both for consoles and personal computers. Targeting high-value, low-risk video game genres was key for some publishers, and small and independent developers were typically forced to compete by abandoning more experimental gameplay and settling into the same genres used by larger publishers.

As hardware capabilities have increased, new genres have become possible, with examples being increased memory, the move from 2D to 3D, new peripherals, online functionalities, and location-based mechanics. Experimental gameplay from indie game development drew more attention in the late 2000s and 2010s aided by independent digital distribution, as large publishers focused on triple-A titles were extremely risk-averse. Through indie games, a revival of experimental gameplay had emerged, and several new genres have emerged since then.

== Definition ==
The use of "Doom clone" (red) versus "first-person shooter" (blue) over time

Due to "direct and active participation" of the player, video game genres differ from literary and film genres. Though one could state that Space Invaders is a science fiction video game, author Mark J.P. Wolf wrote that such a classification "ignores the fundamental differences and similarities which are to be found in the player's experience of the game". In contrast to the visual aesthetics of games, which can vary greatly, it is argued that it is interactivity characteristics that are common to all games.

Like film genres, the names of video game genres have come about generally as a common understanding between the audience and the producers. Descriptive names of genres take into account the goals of the game, the protagonist and even the perspective offered to the player. For example, a first-person shooter is a game that is played from a first-person perspective and involves the practice of shooting. Whereas "shooter game" is a genre name, "first-person shooter" and "third-person shooter" are common subgenres of the shooter genre. Other examples of such prefixes are real-time, turn-based, top-down and side-scrolling.

Genre names may evolve over time. The platform game genre started as "climbing games", based on Steve Bloom's 1982 book Video Invaders, as they were inspired by games like Donkey Kong with ladders and jumping. The same term was used by the US and UK press in 1983, including magazines Electronic Games and TV Gamer. First-person shooters were originally known as "Doom clones" in the years following 1993's Doom, while the term "first-person shooters" became more common by around 2000.

New genres emerge continuously throughout the history of video games, often due to the cross-pollination of ideas borrowed from different games into new ones. For example, the seminal text-based adventure game Colossal Cave Adventure directly inspired the Atari VCS game Adventure, but incorporating joystick control as in an action game rather than typed commands. Adventure served as the prototype of the action-adventure game genre that would be popularized by The Legend of Zelda.

The target audience, underlying theme or purpose of a game are sometimes used as a genre identifier, such as with "Christian game" and "serious game" respectively. However, because these terms do not indicate anything about the gameplay of a video game, these are not considered genres.

== Classifications ==
Video game genres vary in specificity, with popular video game reviews using genre names varying from "action" to "baseball". In this practice, basic themes and more fundamental characteristics are used alongside each other.

A game may combine aspects of multiple genres in such a way that it becomes hard to classify under existing genres. For example, because Grand Theft Auto III combined shooting, driving and role-playing in an unusual way, it was hard to classify using existing terms. The term Grand Theft Auto clone has been used to describe games mechanically similar to Grand Theft Auto III. Similarly, the term roguelike has been developed for games that share similarities with Rogue.

Elements of the role-playing genre, which focuses on storytelling and character growth, have been implemented in many different genres of video games. This is because the addition of a story and character enhancement to an action, strategy or puzzle video game does not take away from its core gameplay, but adds an incentive other than survival to the experience.

In addition to gameplay elements, some games may be categorized by other schemes; such are typically not used as genres:

- By platform: generally to the nature of the computer hardware that the game is played on and not the specific branding. This would include game genres like mobile games for smartphone, tablet computers, or other similar portable devices; and browser games that can be played in a web browser. Identification of the type of hardware a game is played on implied certain limits to the type of gameplay that is available; a mobile game will typically lack as much action compared to a game playable on a home console or computer due to limitations on player input.
- By mode: referring to whether a game is single player, multiplayer, or variations on that, including massively multiplayer online (MMO) games, cooperative games, player versus environment (PvE) or player versus player (PvP) games, and so forth.
- By narrative: Classifying video games by their narrative style, such as science fiction or fantasy, is typically not used within the field. Exceptions include horror games, which broadly cover any game dealing with elements of horror fiction, and cozy games, generally classified as non-violent, low intensity games that give feelings of coziness and comfort.

== Popularity ==
According to some analysts, the percentage of each broad genre in the best-selling physical games worldwide is broken down as follows.

Genre	Softalk 1980-1984	VGC top 100								ESA	Sta
Genre	Softalk 1980-1984	1995	2000	2005	2010	2015	2016	2017	2018	ESA	Sta
Action	61	3	4	12	15	27	25	22	29	22.5	26.9
Adventure	11	2	4	7	6	2	1	0	1	7.8	7.9
Fighting		15	10	5	2	5	3	5	5	5.8	7.8
Platform		10	7	10	9	4	3	4	9		
Puzzle		9	2	6	1	0	0	1	1		
Racing		6	6	13	8	5	4	6	6	3.3	5.8
Role-playing	18	18	25	7	16	12	15	17	12	12.9	11.3
Shooter		11	1	8	14	22	24	19	13	27.5	20.9
Simulation		6	7	5	0	4	4	0	2		
Sports		9	19	17	16	12	13	15	13	11.7	11.1
Strategy	10	7	8	3	1	0	0	2	1	4.3	3.7
Misc		4	7	7	12	7	8	9	8	4.1	4.6

Puzzle games declined when measured by sales, however, on mobile, where the majority of games are free-to-play, the genre remained the most popular worldwide.
