= List of simulation video games =

This is a list of notable simulation games for all video game platforms.

== Battle simulators ==
- Dota Auto Chess (2019) (Mod for Dota 2)
  - Dota Underlords (2020)
- Gratuitous Space Battles
- Half Sword
- MS Field - Kidou Senshi Gundam (1988)
- Robo Crush (1990)
- Teamfight Tactics
- Totally Accurate Battle Simulator
- Ultimate Epic Battle Simulator

== Biological simulation ==
- Catlateral Damage
- Creatures series
  - Creatures
  - Creatures 2
  - Creatures 3
- Dragonseeds
- Dragon Throne: Battle of Red Cliffs
- E.V.O.: Search for Eden
- Eco
- Empire of the Ants (2000)
- Empire of the Ants (2024)
- Evolution: The Game of Intelligent Life
- Goat Simulator 3
- Lion
- Monster Rancher series
  - Monster Rancher 2
  - Monster Rancher Battle Card Game
  - Monster Rancher Explorer
  - Monster Rancher 3
  - Monster Rancher 4
  - Monster Rancher EVO
  - Monster Rancher Advance
  - Monster Rancher Advance 2
- Nanocrafter
- Niche – a genetics survival game
- Odell Lake
- Saurian (video game)
- Science Horizons Survival
- Seventh Cross Evolution
- SimAnt
- SimEarth: The Living Planet
- SimLife
- Spore
- Star Wars Episode I: The Gungan Frontier
- Wolf

== Life simulation ==
- The Sims series
  - The Sims (2000)
    - The Sims: Livin' Large (2000)
    - The Sims: House Party (2001)
    - The Sims: Hot Date (2001)
    - The Sims: Vacation (2002)
    - The Sims: Unleashed (2002)
    - The Sims: Superstar (2003)
    - The Sims: Makin' Magic(2003)
  - The Sims 2 (2004)
    - The Sims 2: University (2005)
    - The Sims 2: Nightlife (2005)
    - The Sims 2: Open for Business (2006)
    - The Sims 2: Pets (2006)
    - The Sims 2: Seasons (2007)
    - The Sims 2: Bon Voyage (2007)
    - The Sims 2: FreeTime (2008)
    - The Sims 2: Apartment Life (2009)
  - The Sims 3 (2009)
    - The Sims 3: World Adventures (2009)
    - The Sims 3: Ambitions (2010)
    - The Sims 3: Late Night (2010)
    - The Sims 3: Generations (2011)
    - The Sims 3: Pets (2011)
    - The Sims 3: Showtime (2012)
    - The Sims 3: Supernatural (2012)
    - The Sims 3: Seasons (2012)
    - The Sims 3: University Life (2012)
    - The Sims 3: Island Paradise (2013)
    - The Sims 3: Into the Future (2013)
  - The Sims 4 (2014)
    - The Sims 4: Get to Work (2015)
    - The Sims 4: Get Together (2015)
    - The Sims 4: City Living (2016)
    - The Sims 4: Cats & Dogs (2017)
    - The Sims 4: Seasons (2018)
    - The Sims 4: Get Famous (2018)
    - The Sims 4: Island Living (2019)
    - The Sims 4: Discover University (2019)
    - The Sims 4: Eco Lifestyle (2020)
    - The Sims 4: Snowy Escape (2020)
- Tamagotchi
  - Tamagotchi (1997)
- Viva Piñata series
  - Viva Piñata (2006)
  - Viva Piñata: Trouble in Paradise (2008)
  - Viva Piñata: Pocket Paradise (2008)

=== Social simulation ===
- Aa Yakyū Jinsei Itchokusen
- Alter Ego
- America Daitōryō Senkyo
- Animal Crossing series
- Chibi-Robo! series
  - Chibi-Robo!
  - Chibi-Robo!: Park Patrol
- Crime and Punishment
- Desperate Housewives: The Game
- Executive Suite
- GiFTPiA
- Gossip
- Jones in the Fast Lane
- Little Computer People
- Paralives
- Real Lives
- Singles series
  - Singles: Flirt Up Your Life
  - Singles 2: Triple Trouble
- Space Colony
- Trust & Betrayal: The Legacy of Siboot
- Stardew Valley
- Wall Street Kid

== Construction and management simulation ==
=== Business simulation ===
- Virtonomics series

=== Airport management ===
- Airline Tycoon (series)
- SimPort

=== City-building ===
- Anno (series)
  - (1998) Anno 1602 (in the US and Australia released as 1602 A.D.)
  - (2003) Anno 1503 (known in the US as 1503 A.D.: The New World)
  - (2006) Anno 1701
  - (2007) Anno 1701: The Sunken Dragon
  - (2007) Anno 1701: Dawn of Discovery
  - (2009) Anno 1404, known in North America as Dawn of Discovery
  - (2009) Anno 1404: Venice
  - (2009) Anno: Create A New World
  - (2011) Anno 2070
  - (2013) Anno Online
  - (2015) Anno 2205
  - (2019) Anno 1800
  - (2025) Anno 117: Pax Romana
- Caesar series
  - Caesar
  - Caesar II
  - Caesar III
  - Caesar IV
- Cities XL series
  - Cities XL
  - Cities XL 2011
  - Cities XL 2012
- Cities: Skylines (2015)
  - Cities: Skylines II (2023)
- Construction Simulator (2015)
- Constructor – PC (1997)
- Emperor: Rise of the Middle Kingdom
- Immortal Cities: Children of the Nile
- Islanders – PC (2019)
- Pharaoh
- RimWorld
- The Settlers series
  - The Settlers
  - The Settlers II
  - The Settlers III
  - The Settlers IV
  - The Settlers: Heritage of Kings
  - The Settlers: Rise of an Empire
  - The Settlers 7: Paths to a Kingdom
  - The Settlers: New Allies
- The SimCity series – PC (1989–present)
  - SimCity
  - SimCity 2000
  - SimCity 3000
  - SimCity 4
  - SimCity 5
- Surviving Mars – 2018
- Outpost
- Outpost 2
- Townscaper – 2020
- Utopia: The Creation of a Nation – 1991
- Zeus: Master of Olympus

=== God games ===
- Black & White – 2001
- Black and White 2 – 2005
- Dyson Sphere Program – 2021
- From Dust
- Godus
- Reus – 2013
- Reus 2 – 2024

=== Government simulation ===
- Balance of Power
- Commander in Chief
- Masters of the World (video game)
- CyberJudas
- Democracy series
  - Democracy
  - Democracy 2
  - Democracy 3
- eRepublik
- Floor 13
- Geo Political Simulator series
- Global Domination
- Hidden Agenda
- No. 10: Full Confidence
- President Elect
- President Forever 2008 + Primaries
- The Cardinal of the Kremlin
- The Global Dilemma: Guns or Butter
- The Political Machine
- Tropico series
  - Tropico
  - Tropico 2
  - Tropico 3
  - Tropico 4
  - Tropico 5
  - Tropico 6
- Europa Universalis series
  - Europa Universalis
  - Europa Universalis II
  - Europa Universalis III
  - Europa Universalis: Rome
  - Europa Universalis IV
  - Europa Universalis V
- Superpower series
  - Superpower
  - Superpower 2

=== Sports management ===
==== Baseball ====
- Baseball Mogul series
- Diamond Mind Baseball series
- MicroLeague Baseball
- Out of the Park Baseball series
- PureSim Baseball series
  - PureSim Baseball 2007

==== Cricket ====
- International Cricket Captain series
- Don Bradman Cricket

==== Football (American) ====
- Football Mogul series
- Front Office Football series
- Front Page Sports Football
- Madden NFL series
  - Madden NFL '95
  - Madden NFL '96
- NFL Head Coach
- Retro Bowl

==== Football (Association) ====
- Championship Manager series
- FIFA Manager series
- Football Manager series
- Gazza's Superstar Soccer
- Hattrick
- Let's Make a Soccer Team!
- LMA Manager series
- O'Leary Manager 2000
- Player Manager
- Premier Manager series
- Tactical Manager
- Ultimate Soccer Manager
- Winning Eleven

==== Gaelic Games ====
- Irish Sport Manager

==== Hockey ====
- Eastside Hockey Manager series
  - Eastside Hockey Manager
  - NHL Eastside Hockey Manager
  - NHL Eastside Hockey Manager 2005
  - NHL Eastside Hockey Manager 2007
- Franchise Hockey Manager

==== Horse racing ====
- Derby Stallion
  - Derby Stallion: Best Keiba (1991)
  - Dābīsutarion Zenkokuban (1992)
  - Derby Stallion 64 (2001)
- Umamusume: Pretty Derby

==== Racing ====
- Formula One series
- F1 series (Codemasters)
- Grand Prix Manager series
  - Grand Prix Manager
  - Grand Prix Manager 2
  - Grand Prix World
- Motorsport Manager

=== Miscellaneous ===
- Blockland
- Blocksworld
- Chaos League
- Extreme Warfare / Extreme Wrestling
- FortressCraft
- Gladius
- Minecraft
- Luanti (Free and open source clone of Minecraft)
- Prison Architect
- Prison Architect 2 (unreleased)
- Roblox
- Title Bout Championship Boxing
- Total Miner

== Vehicle simulation ==
=== Bus simulation ===
- The Bus
- Bus Driver
- Bus Simulator 16
- Bus Simulator 18
- Bus Simulator 21
- City Bus Simulator
- Desert Bus
- Fernbus Simulator
- OMSI 2
- Tourist Bus Simulator

=== Car simulation ===
- BeamNG.drive

==== Racing simulation ====
- ARCA Sim Racing
- Assetto Corsa Series
  - Assetto Corsa
  - Assetto Corsa Competizione
  - Assetto Corsa Rally
- Codemasters F1 Series
  - F1 2010
  - F1 2011
  - F1 2012
  - F1 2013
  - F1 2014
  - F1 2015
  - F1 2016
  - F1 2017
  - F1 2018
  - F1 2019
  - F1 2020
  - F1 2021
  - F1 2022
  - F1 23
  - F1 24
  - F1 25
- Colin McRae Rally Series
  - Colin McRae Rally
  - Colin McRae Rally 2.0
  - Colin McRae Rally 3
  - Colin McRae Rally 04
  - Colin McRae Rally 2005
- Dirt Series
  - Colin McRae: Dirt
  - Colin McRae: Dirt 2
  - Dirt 3
  - Dirt 4
  - Dirt 5
  - Dirt: Showdown
  - Dirt Rally
  - Dirt Rally 2.0
- EA Sports F1 Series
  - F1 Challenge '99–'02
- Enthusia Professional Racing
- Forza Motorsport Series
  - Forza Motorsport
  - Forza Motorsport 2
  - Forza Motorsport 3
  - Forza Motorsport 4
  - Forza Motorsport 5
  - Forza Motorsport 6
  - Forza Motorsport 7
- Geoff Crammond's Grand Prix Series
  - Formula One Grand Prix
  - Grand Prix 2
  - Grand Prix 3
  - Grand Prix 3 2000
  - Grand Prix 4
- Gran Turismo Series
  - Gran Turismo
  - Gran Turismo 2
  - Gran Turismo 3: A-Spec
  - Gran Turismo Concept
  - Gran Turismo 4 Prologue
  - Gran Turismo 4
  - Gran Turismo HD Concept
  - Gran Turismo 5 Prologue
  - Gran Turismo 5
  - Gran Turismo 6
  - Gran Turismo Sport
  - Gran Turismo 7
- Grand Prix Legends
- GT Legends
- GTR Series
  - GTR - FIA GT Racing Game
  - GTR - FIA GT Racing Game 2
- Indianapolis 500: The Simulation
- IndyCar Racing Series
  - IndyCar Racing
  - IndyCar Racing II
- iRacing.com
- Live For Speed
- NASCAR Racing Series
  - NASCAR Racing
  - NASCAR Racing 2
    - NASCAR Grand National Series Expansion Pack
  - NASCAR Legends
  - NASCAR Racing 1999 Edition
  - NASCAR Craftsman Truck Racing
  - NASCAR Racing 3
  - NASCAR Racing 4
  - NASCAR Racing 2002 Season
  - NASCAR Racing 2003 Season
- NASCAR Heat Series
  - NASCAR Heat
  - NASCAR: Dirt to Daytona
- netKar Pro
- Project CARS series
  - Project CARS
  - Project CARS 2
  - Project CARS 3
- Need for Speed Series
- RACE Series
  - RACE - The Official WTCC Game
  - RACE 07 - The Official WTCC Game
    - Formula Raceroom
    - GTR Evolution
    - STCC – The Game
- Raceroom Racing Experience
- Rally Championship Series
  - Network Q RAC Rally (video game)
  - Network Q RAC Rally Championship
  - International Rally Championship
  - Mobil 1 Rally Championship
- Real Racing Series
  - Real Racing (video game)
  - Real Racing 2
  - EA Real Racing 3
- rFactor Series
  - rFactor
  - rFactor 2
- Richard Burns Rally

===== Miscellaneous =====
- My Summer Car
- Racer
- Rally Trophy
- Richard Burns Rally
- Simraceway
- SODA Off-Road Racing
- Spirit of Speed 1937
- Stormworks: Build and Rescue
- Stunt Car Driver
- The Open Racing Cars Simulator
- Viper Racing

=== Farming Simulation ===
- Farming Simulator series

=== Flight simulation ===
- Ace Combat series
  - Air Combat
  - Ace Combat 2
  - Ace Combat 3: Electrosphere
  - Ace Combat 04: Shattered Skies
  - Ace Combat 5: The Unsung War
  - Ace Combat 6: Fires of Liberation
  - Ace Combat Advance
  - Ace Combat X: Skies of Deception
  - Ace Combat Zero: The Belkan War
  - Ace Combat 7: Skies Unknown
- Su-27 Flanker (video game)
- Flanker 2.0
- Flanker 2.5
- Lock On: Modern Air Combat
- Digital Combat Simulator
- Falcon series
  - Falcon 4.0
  - Falcon 4.0: Allied Force
- FlightGear
- Fly! series
  - Fly!
  - Fly! II
- Flight Unlimited series
  - Flight Unlimited
  - Flight Unlimited II
  - Flight Unlimited III
- IL-2 Sturmovik series
- Kerbal Space Program
- Microsoft Combat Flight Simulator series
  - Microsoft Combat Flight Simulator
  - Combat Flight Simulator 2
  - Combat Flight Simulator 3: Battle for Europe
- SubLogic Flight Simulator series
  - FS1 Flight Simulator
  - Flight Simulator II (Sublogic)
- Microsoft Flight Simulator series
  - Flight Simulator 1.0
  - Flight Simulator 2.0
  - Flight Simulator 3.0
  - Flight Simulator 4.0
  - Flight Simulator 5.0
  - Flight Simulator 5.1
  - Flight Simulator 95
  - Flight Simulator 98
  - Flight Simulator 2000
  - Flight Simulator 2002
  - Flight Simulator 2004: A Century of Flight
  - Microsoft Flight Simulator X
  - Microsoft Flight
  - Flight Simulator 2020
- Microsoft Space Simulator
- X-Plane series

=== Motorcycle simulation ===
- Superbike 2000
- Superbike 2001
- Superbike World Championship (video game)
- SBK-07: Superbike World Championship
- SBK-08: Superbike World Championship
- SBK-09: Superbike World Championship
- SBK X: Superbike World Championship
- SBK 2011
- SBK Generations
- SBK 22

=== Submarine simulation ===
- 688 Attack Sub
- Jane's Combat Simulations: 688(I) Hunter/Killer
- Aces of the Deep
- AquaNox
- Barotrauma
- Dangerous Waters
- Enigma: Rising Tide
- Gato (computer game)
- The Hunt for Red October (1987)
- Red Storm Rising
- SSN-21 Seawolf
- Shells of Fury
- Silent Hunter
- Silent Hunter II
- Silent Hunter III
- Silent Hunter 4: Wolves of the Pacific
- Silent Hunter 4: The U-Boat Missions (add-on expansion pack)
- Silent Hunter 5: Battle of the Atlantic
- Silent Service (video game)
- Silent Service II
- Silent Steel
- Sub Battle Simulator
- Sub Command
- Tom Clancy's SSN
- Treasures of the Deep
- WolfPack
- Sub Hunt

=== Ship simulation ===
- Ship Simulator series
  - Ship Simulator Extremes
- Virtual Sailor
- Deadliest Catch: Alaskan Storm
- World of Warships (2015)

=== Tank simulation ===
- World War II Online (2001–2012, virtual battlefield)
- M4 (1992)
- Panzer Front
- Steel Beasts
- Steel Fury
- Wild Metal Country (A.K.A. Wild Metal)
- World of Tanks
- War Thunder

=== Train simulations ===
- Densha de Go!
- Mini Metro
- Microsoft Train Simulator
- OpenBVE
- Train Fever
- Train Simulator 2013
- Trainz Simulator 12
- Train Simulator
- Train Sim World
- World of Subways
- RUNNING TRAIN

=== Truck simulation ===
- 18 Wheels of Steel series
- American Truck Simulator
- Hard Truck series
- King of the Road
- Euro Truck Simulator
- Euro Truck Simulator 2
- German Truck Simulator
- UK Truck Simulator
- Rig 'n' Roll
- Rigs of Rods
- Street Cleaning Simulator
- Spintires
- MudRunner
- SnowRunner

==== Miscellaneous ====
- FlightGear
- Infinite Flight
- Top Gun: Danger Zone
- World of Warplanes
- War Thunder
- Prepar3D
- WarBirds

== Other simulations ==
=== Programming games ===
- Colobot
- TIS-100

=== Trade simulation ===
- Discovery: In the Steps of Columbus
- Drug Dealer Simulator
- High Seas Trader
- Merchant Prince series
  - Merchant Prince
  - Machiavelli: The Prince
  - Merchant Prince II
- The Patrician
- Patrician II: Quest for Power
- Patrician III
- Port Royale: Gold, Power and Pirates
- Port Royale 2
- Port Royale 3: Pirates & Merchants
- Port Royale 4
- Potion Craft
- Schedule I
- Uncharted Waters series
  - Uncharted Waters
  - Uncharted Waters: New Horizons
    - Mobile Uncharted Waters II
  - Daikoukai Jidai Gaiden
  - Daikoukai Jidai III: Costa Del Sol
  - Daikoukai Jidai IV: Porto Estado
    - Daikoukai Jidai IV: Rota Nova
  - Uncharted Waters Online
    - Uncharted Waters Online La Frontera
- Trade Empires

=== Dressmaking simulation ===
- Dressmaker (2026)
- Fashion Designer: Style Icon (2007)
- Magical Craft: My Enchanted Dress Shop (2025)

=== Photo simulation ===
- Afrika (PlayStation 3)
- Pokémon Snap (Nintendo 64)
- Flock Around (Windows; MacOS)
- Gekibo: Gekisha Boy (PC Engine)
- The Cameraman: Gekisha Boy Omakefu (PlayStation)
- Polaroid Pete (PlayStation 2)
- Rilakkuma na Mainichi (Game Boy Advance)
- Wild Earth: African Safari (Wii)
- Sea Life Safari (Xbox 360)

=== Medical simulation ===
- Emergency Room series
- Hospital Tycoon
- LifeSigns: Surgical Unit
- Life & Death
- Life & Death II: The Brain
- Plague Inc.
- Theme Hospital
- Trauma Center series
  - Trauma Center: Under the Knife
  - Trauma Center: Second Opinion
  - Trauma Center: New Blood
  - Trauma Center: Under the Knife 2
  - Trauma Team
- Two Point Hospital
- Surgeon Simulator 2013
- Microsurgeon (video game)

== Motion simulators with screens ==
- Rawdog Simulator
- Typhoon (simulator)

== See also ==
- List of city-building video games
- List of business simulation video games
- List of theme park management video games
- Simulated reality
