= Street sweeper =

Machine or person that cleans streets in urban areas

External image
- An example of a street sweeper tram from the early 20th century, Holyoke St. Rwy (1934)

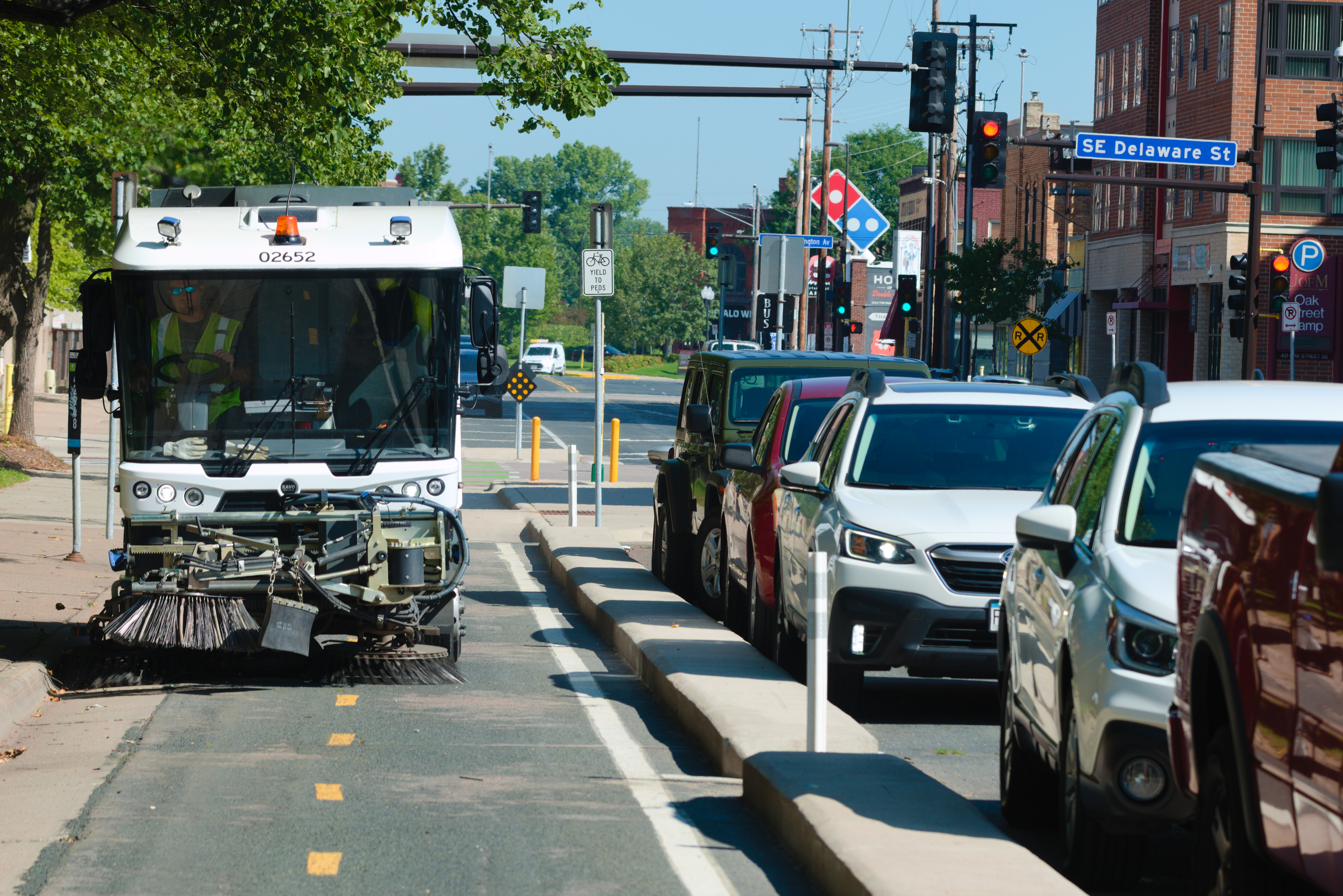
A street sweeper clearing dirt and debris from a bike lane in Minneapolis in 2022

A street sweeper or street cleaner is a person or machine that cleans streets.

People have worked in cities as "sanitation workers" since sanitation and waste removal became a priority. A street-sweeping person would use a broom and shovel to clean off litter, animal waste and filth that accumulated on streets. Later, water hoses were used to wash the streets.

Street sweepers as machines were created in the 19th century to do the job more easily. Today, modern street sweepers are mounted on truck bodies and can vacuum debris that accumulates in streets.

== History ==
=== Manual sweeping ===
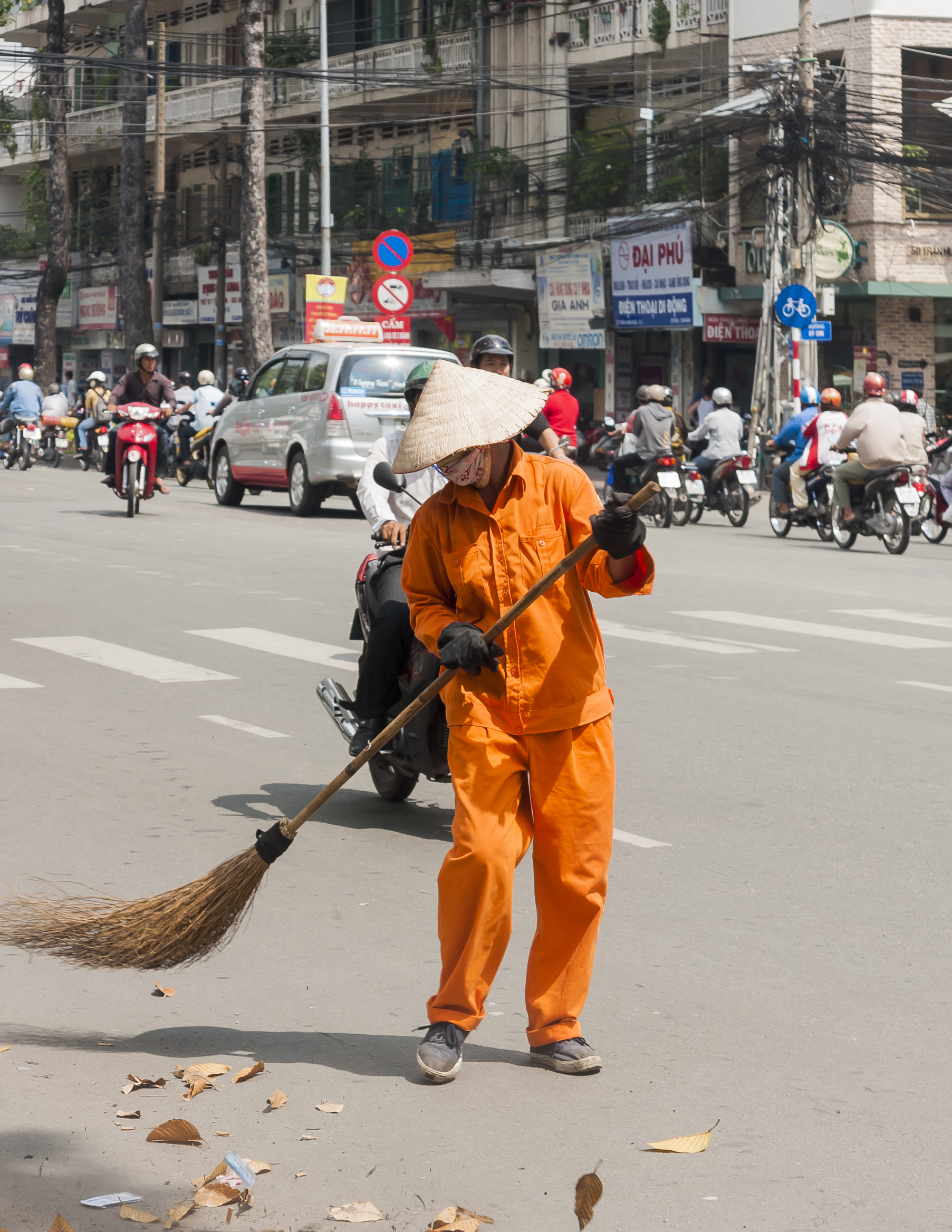
Road sweeper working in Ho Chi Minh City, Vietnam

The need for rubbish to be removed from roads in built-up areas has existed for centuries.

Sometimes a local law in a town or city ordered the owner or occupier of each address to clean the length of that road that passed his address.

Sometimes, when much traffic was horse-drawn vehicles or ridden horses, there were street cleaners who selectively removed horse droppings because of their value as fertilizer on nearby rural areas.

=== Mechanical sweepers in the United Kingdom ===
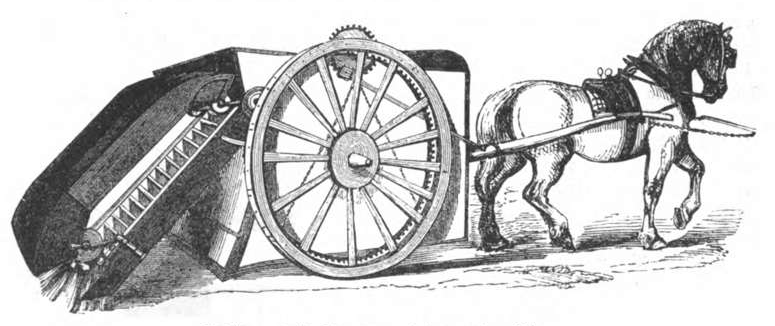
Mechanical street sweeper by Joseph Whitworth, 1846

By the 1840s, Manchester, England, had become known as the first industrial city. Manchester had one of the largest textile industries of that time. As a result, the robust metropolis was said to be England's unhealthiest place to live. In response to this unsanitary environment, Joseph Whitworth invented the mechanical street sweeper. The street sweeper was designed with the primary objective to remove rubbish from streets in order to maintain aesthetic goals and safety.

=== Mechanical sweepers in the United States ===
The very first street sweeping machine was patented in 1849 by its inventor, C.S. Bishop. For a long time, street sweepers were just rotating disks covered with wire bristles. These rotating disks served as mechanical brooms that swept the dirt on the streets.

Street and track sweeper streetcar in Columbus, Ohio 1928

The first self-propelled sweeper vehicle patented in the US, driven by a steam engine and intended for cleaning railroad tracks, was patented in 1868, patent No. 79606. Eureka C. Bowne was the first known woman to get a patent for a street sweeper, in 1879, patent No. 222447. "Her success was great", wrote Matilda Joslyn Gage in The North American Review, volume 136, issue 318, May 1883.

In 1896, African-American inventor Charles Brooks improved on then-conventional street sweeping inventions by making the front brushes of different lengths, and by including a mechanism for collection and disposal of debris. The revolving front brushes could also be replaced with a scraper to remove snow or ice. Brooks was granted a U.S. patent for the invention in 1896. Most of the more than 300 street sweeper patents issued in the United States before 1900, including the one in Brooks's patent, had no engine on board. The wheels on the cart turned gears or chains which drove the brush and belt.

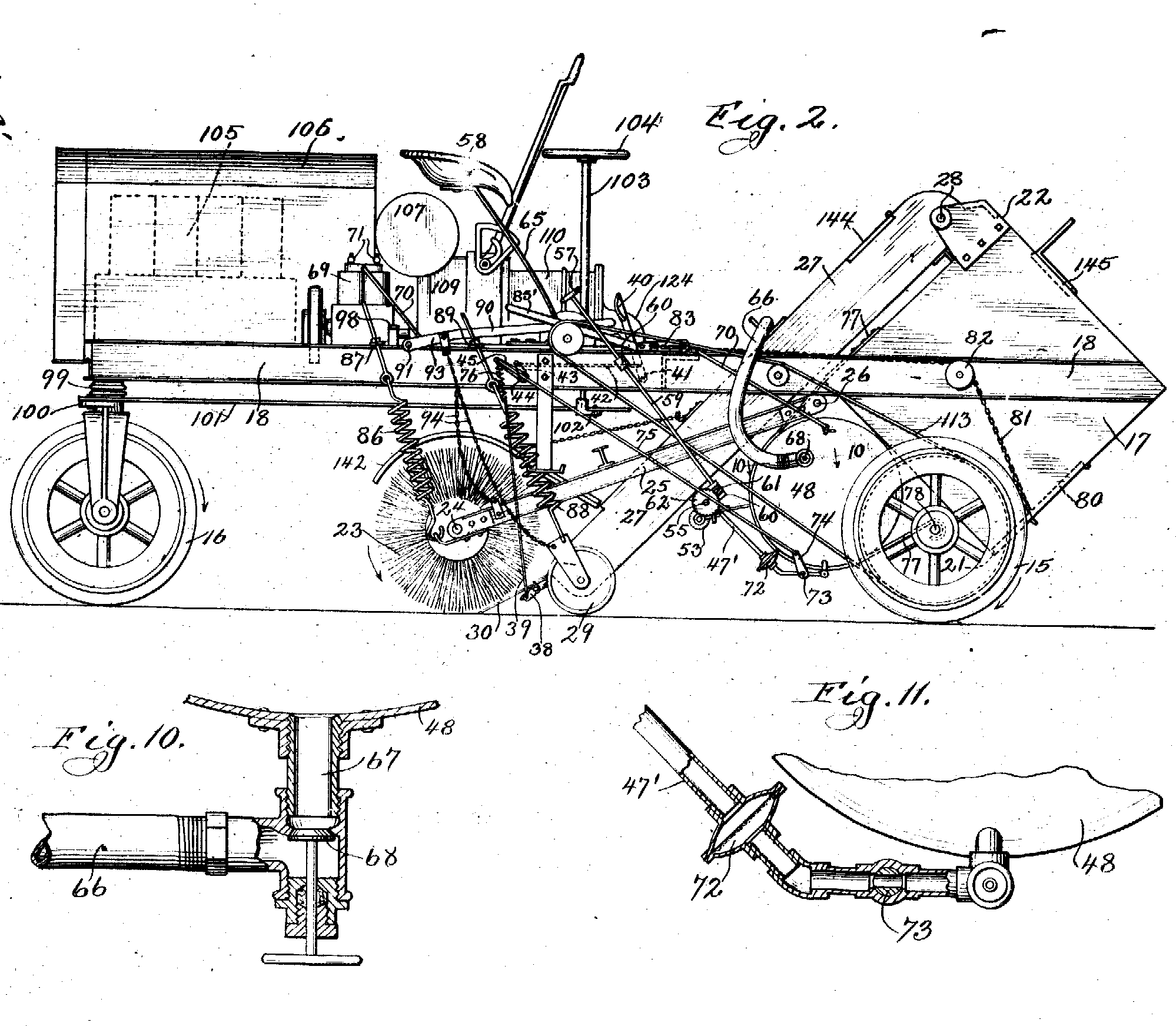
Diagram of an early Elgin Sweeper machine, 1913

John M. Murphy called at the offices of American Tower and Tank Company in Elgin, Illinois, in the fall of 1911. He had a plan of a motor-driven pickup street sweeper. The American Tower and Tank Company had been formed in 1903 by Charles A. Whiting and James Todd. They called in a recently acquired silent partner, Daniel M. Todd, and it was decided to hire Murphy and begin the development of his idea. That started what has become the Elgin Sweeper Company.

After two years of development, a sweeper was achieved which Murphy was satisfied performed all of the sweeping functions in the manner he had envisioned – one which partners James and Daniel M. Todd and Charles A. Whiting were willing to risk a reputation gained from 30 years' manufacturing experience.

Following a demonstration, the city of Boise, Idaho, purchased the first Elgin Sweeper in the fall of 1913. Boise Street Commissioner Thomas Finegan made a comparison showing a savings of $2,716.77 from the Elgin motorized sweeper when used rather than a horse-drawn sweeper.

Following its introduction and initial sales, Murphy continued improving his sweeper. In 1917, US patents were filed and issues for J. M. Murphy, Street Sweeping machine No. 1,239,293.

=== Technological advancement ===
The goal of simple debris removal did not change until the 1970s, when policymakers began to reflect concern for water quality. In the United States, the lag time in which street sweepers responded can be pinpointed to the Runoff Report of 1998. As older street sweepers were only effective in removing large particles of road debris, small particles of debris remained behind in large quantities. The remaining debris was not seen as an aesthetic issue because rain would wash them away. Today, small particles are known to carry a substantial portion of the stormwater pollutant load.

Street sweeping can be an effective measure in reducing pollutants in stormwater runoff. The Environmental Protection Agency considers street sweeping a best practice in protecting water quality.

=== Modern sweepers ===
A sweeper being used to clean a sidewalk alongside pedestrians in Philadelphia, 2015

Street sweepers are capable of collecting small particles of debris. Many street sweepers produced today are PM10 and PM2.5 certified, meaning that they are capable of collecting and holding particulate matter sized less than 10μm and even down to 2.5μm.

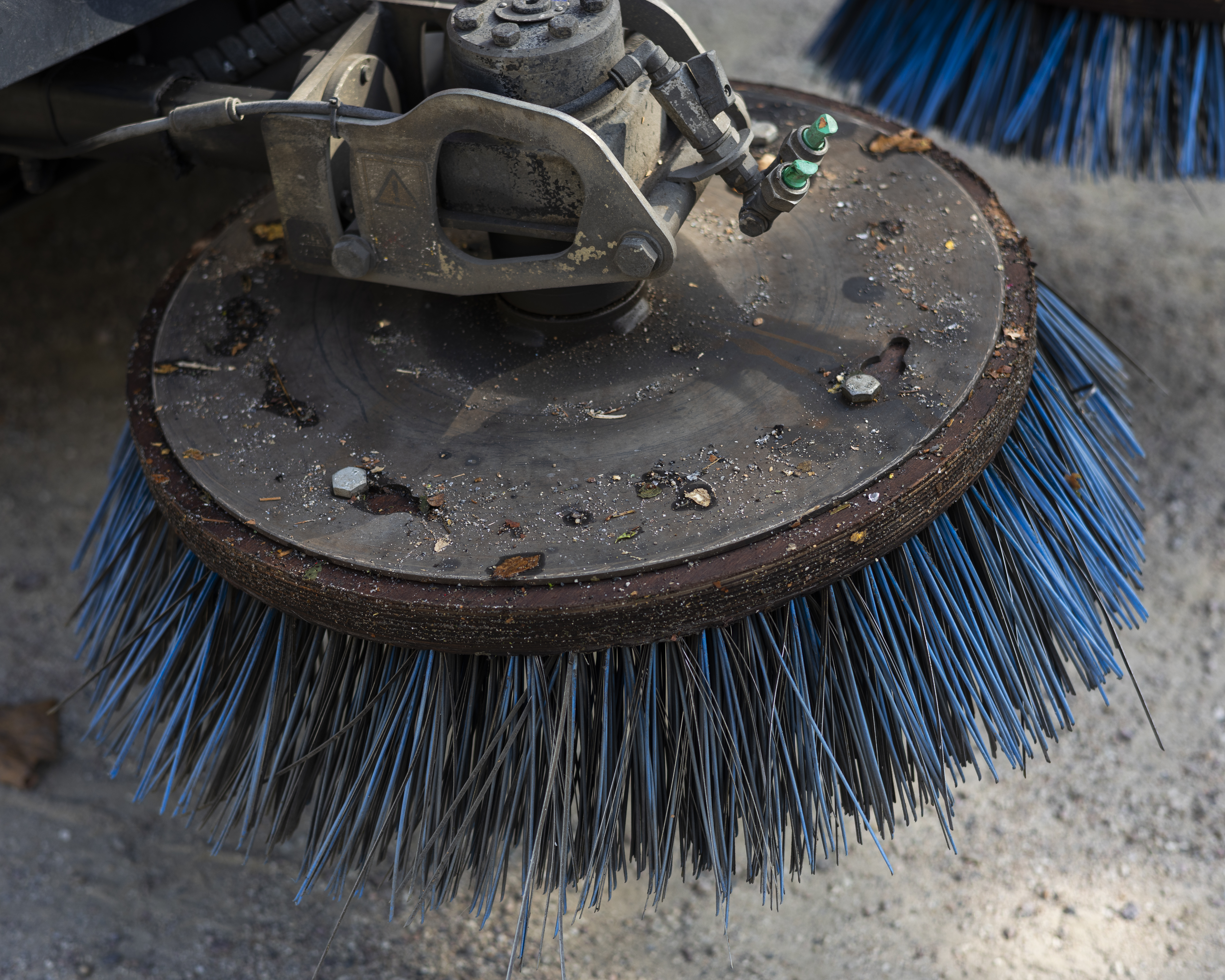
Wire bristles on the brush of a modern sweeper in Wiesbaden

Despite advancements in street-sweeping technology, the mechanical broom-type street sweeper accounts for approximately 90 percent of all street sweepers used in the United States today. In 2018, Boschung, a Swiss street sweeper manufacturer, launched the Urban-Sweeper S2.0, the first fully electric street sweeper releasing zero emissions.

Smaller mechanical sweepers are often employed to maintain bike lanes and paved walking paths. Inventions in the 2020s include electric sweepers that can be towed behind a bike or ebike.

== Gallery ==
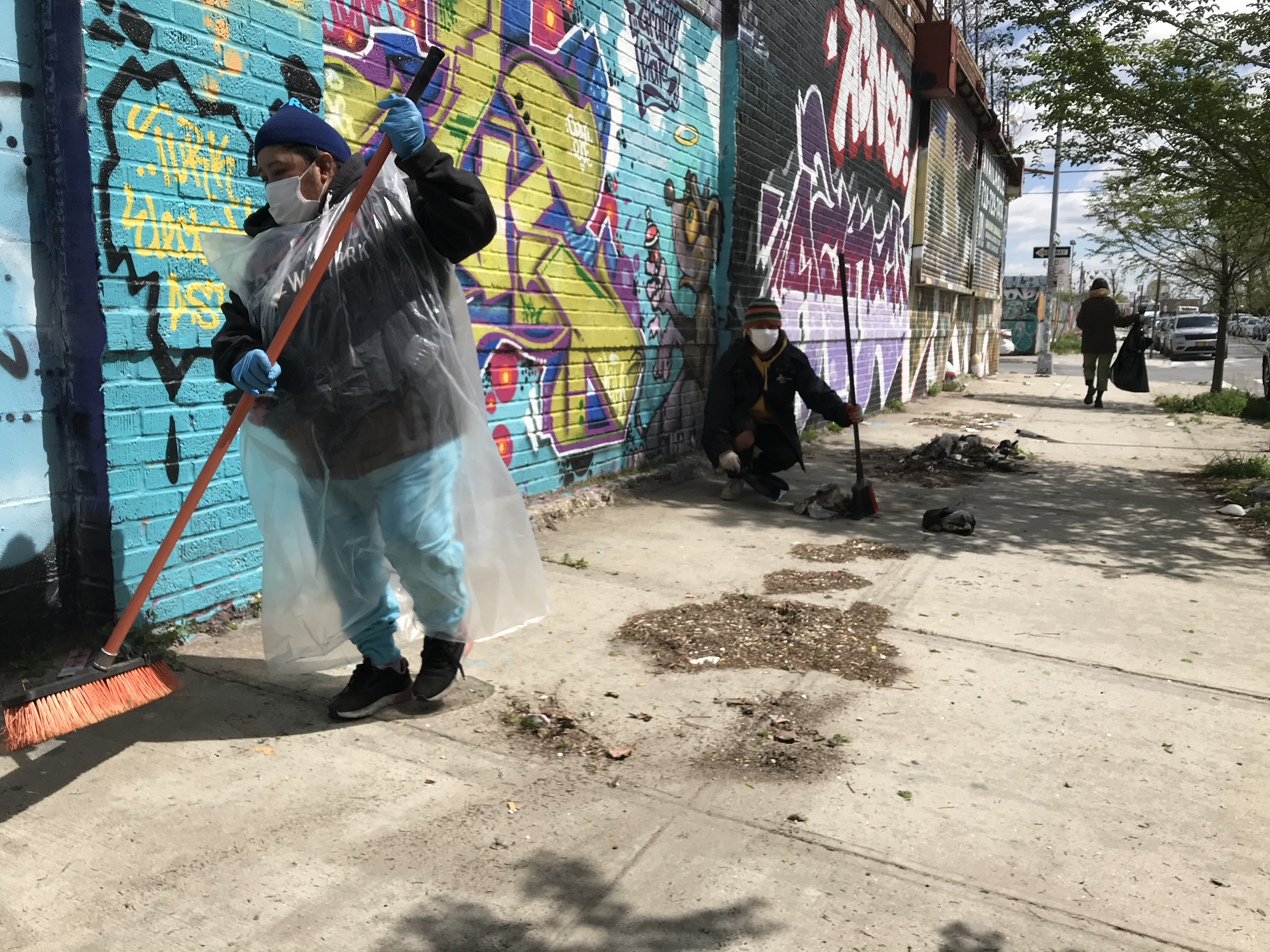
Two street sweepers clearing a pavement in New York City

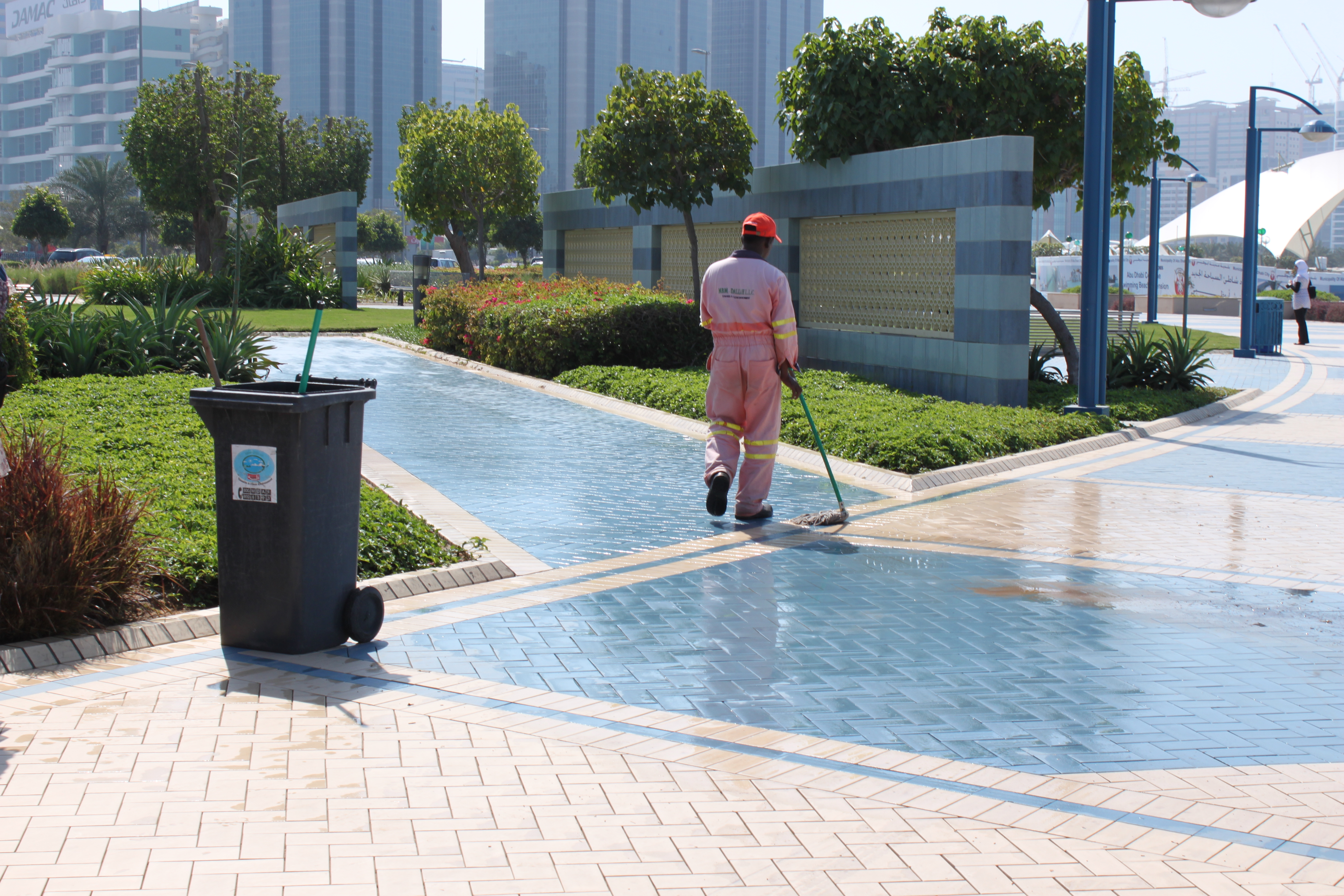
Street cleaner cleaning the pavement in Abu Dhabi, Middle East

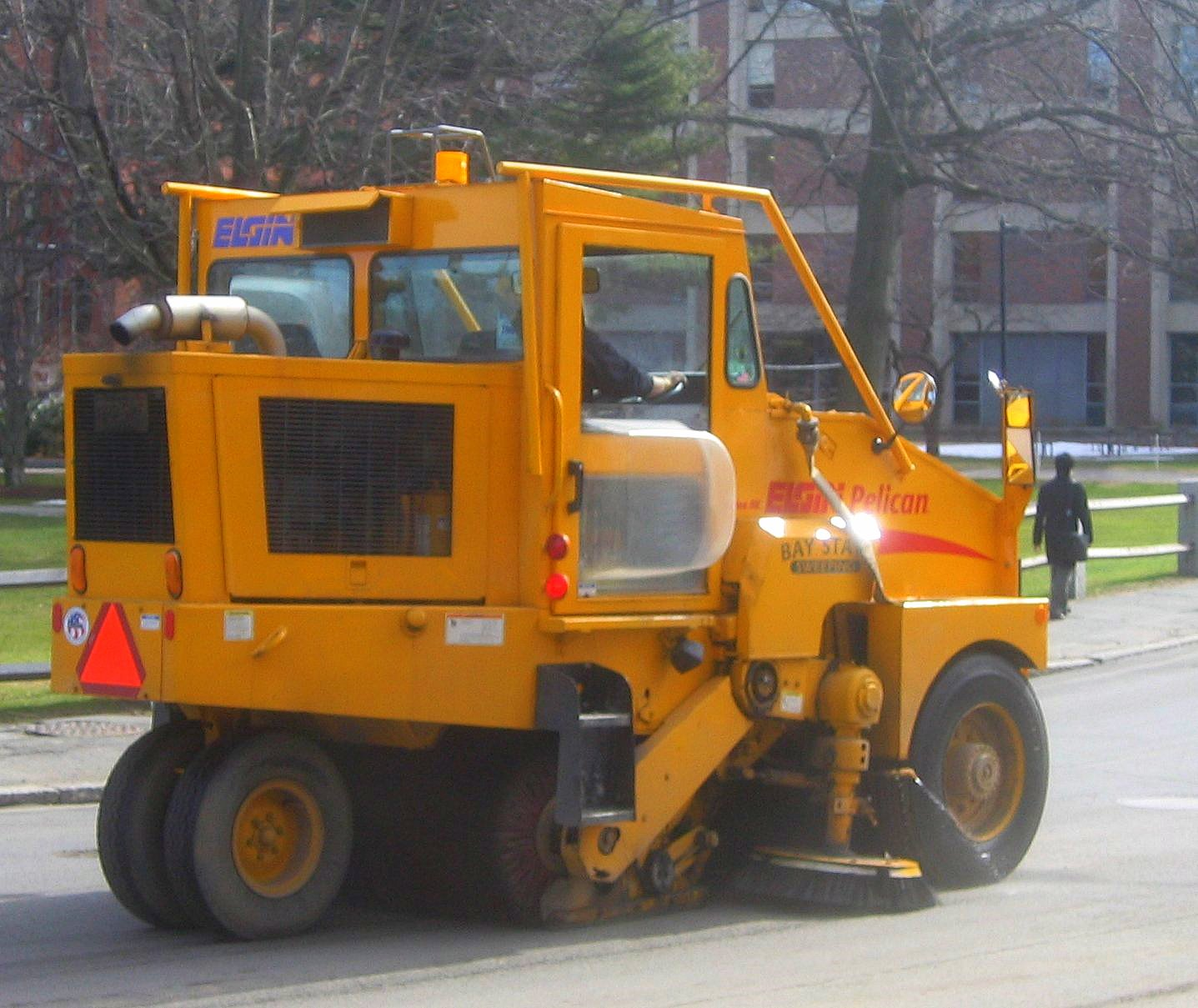
A mechanical street cleaner in Cambridge

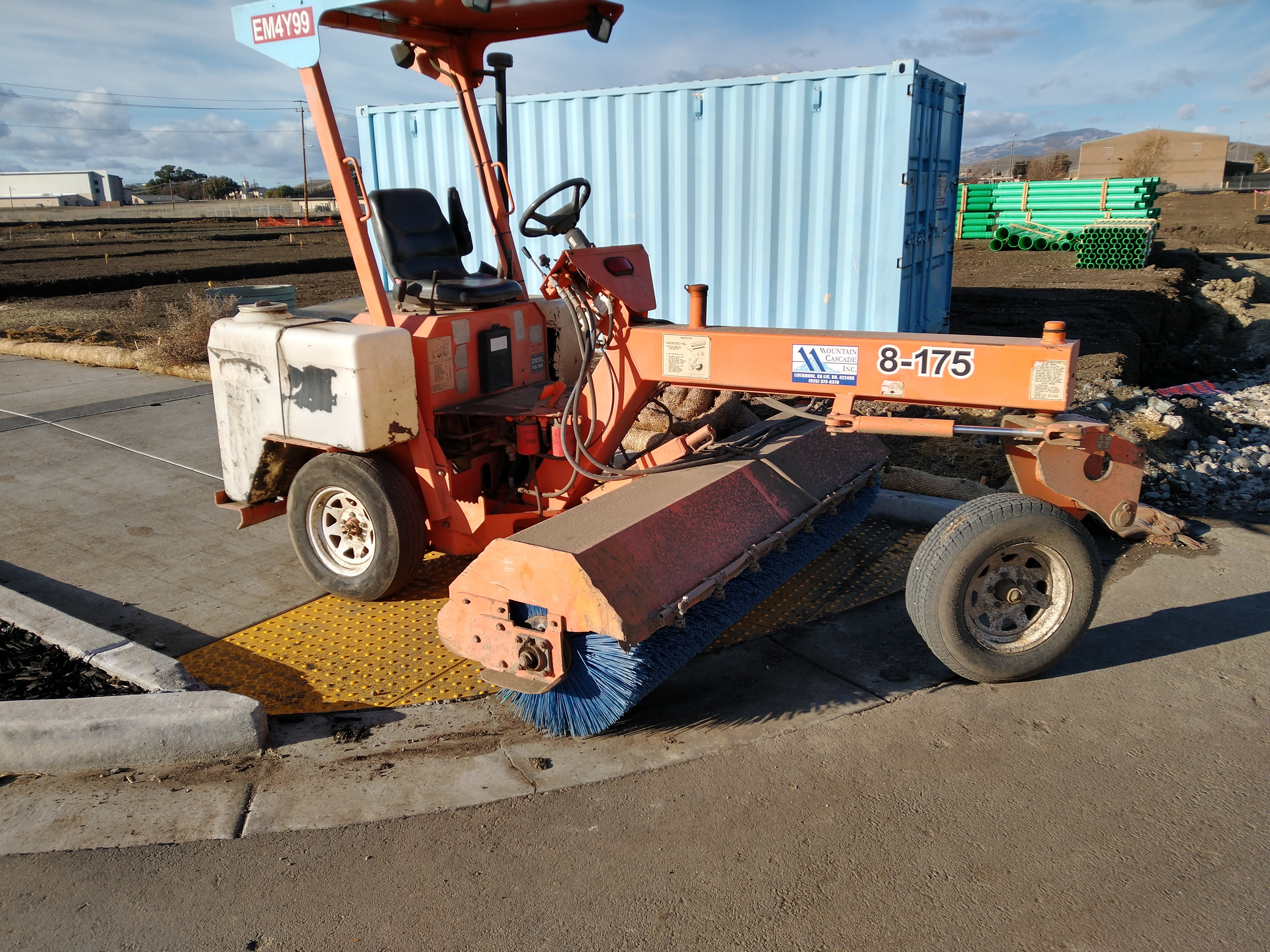
A mecahnical street cleaner in Dublin, California

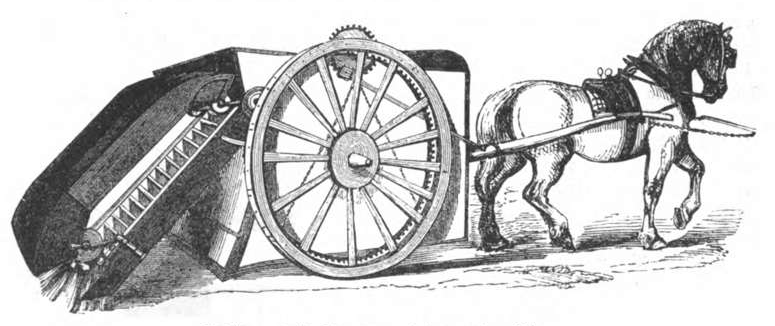
Mechanical street sweeper by Joseph Whitworth, 1846

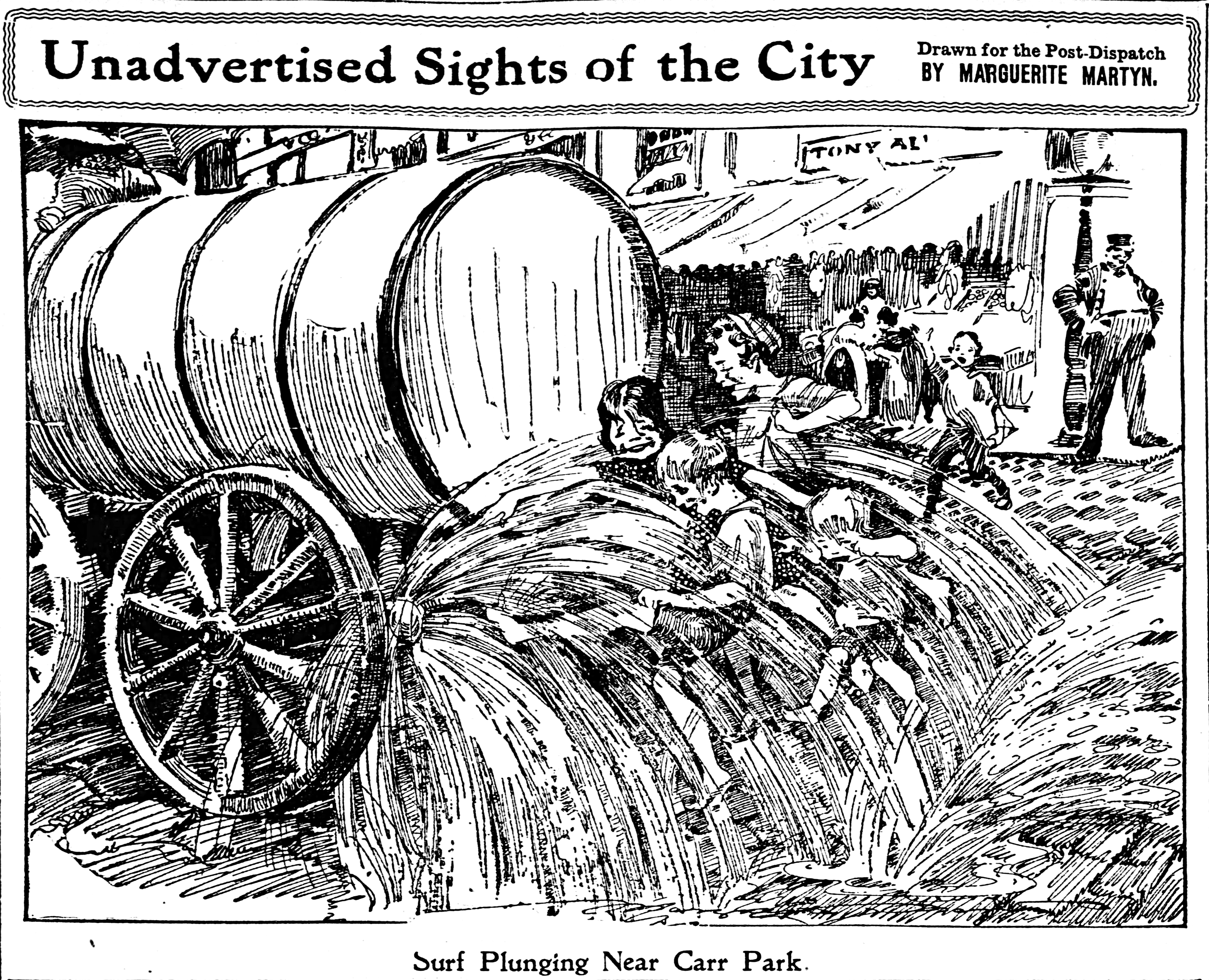
Drawing by Marguerite Martyn of children following a street-cleaning wagon dispensing water to clear streets of debris in St. Louis, Missouri, 1914

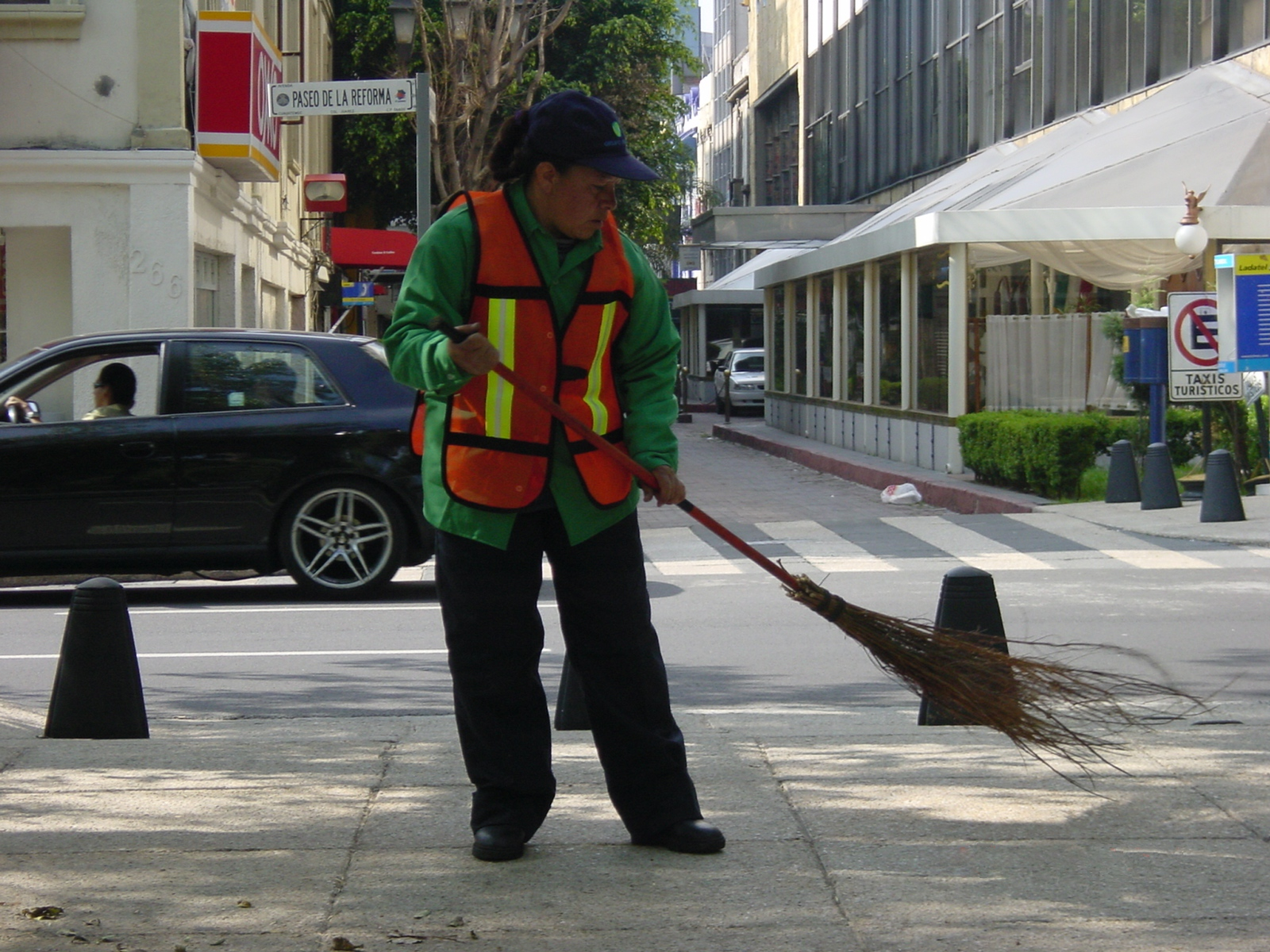
Street sweeper in Paseo de la Reforma in Mexico City, 2004

Monument of street sweeper in St. Petersburg, Russia, 2006-2009

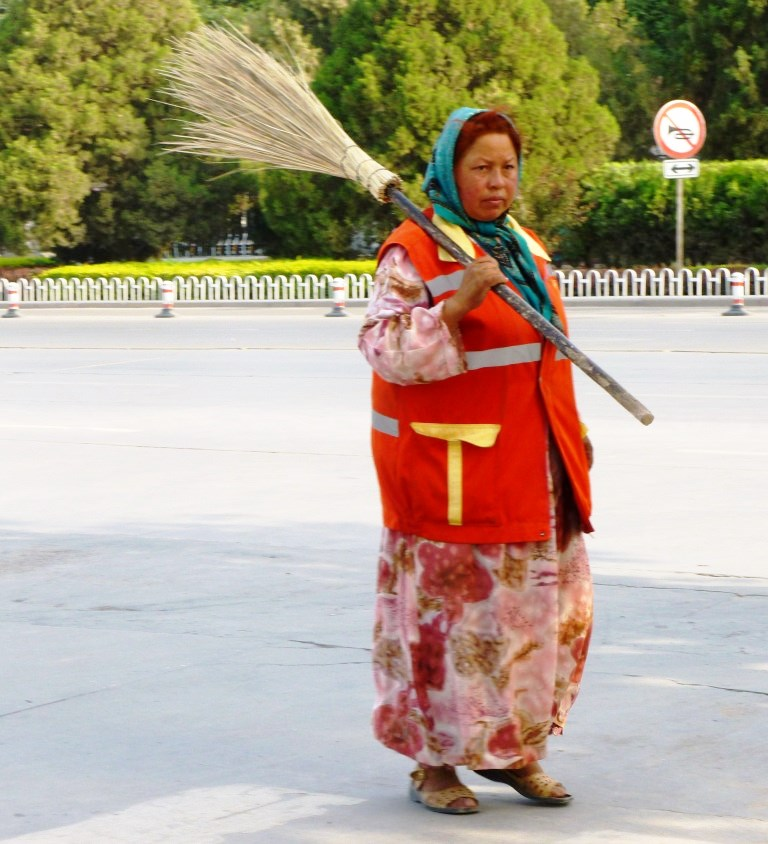
Street sweeper. Kashgar 2011

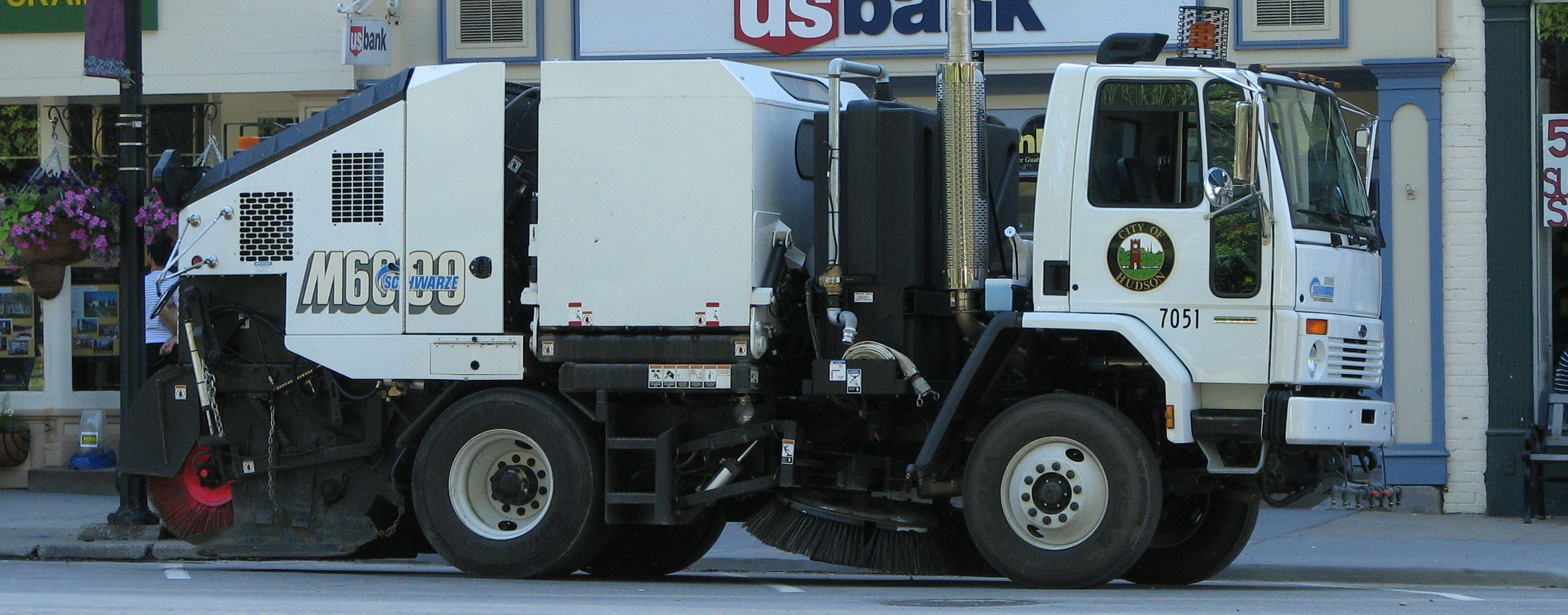
Mechanical street sweeper in Ohio, 2011

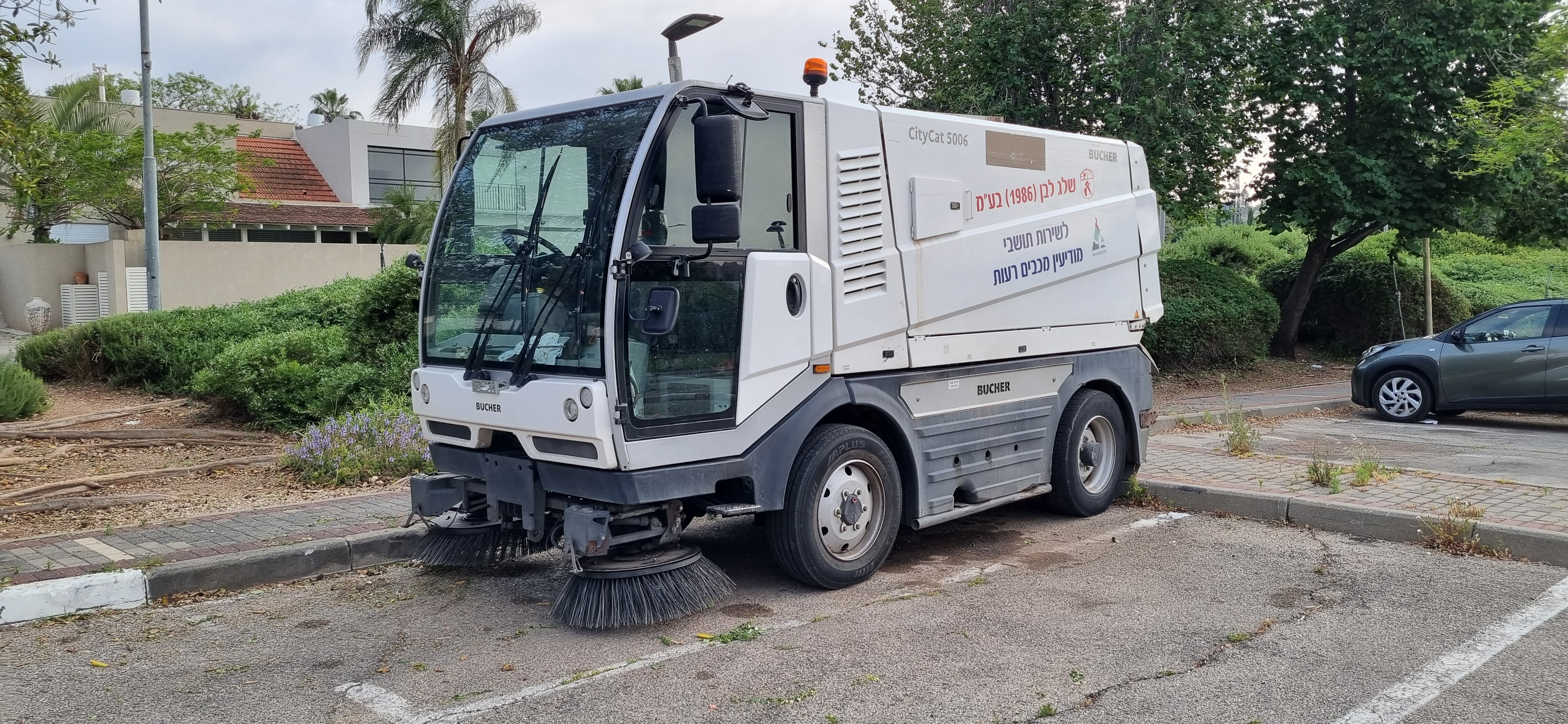
Street sweeper in Modiin, 2024

== See also ==
- Best management practice for water pollution
- Floor buffer
- Road debris
- Snow removal
- Storm drain
- Street Cleaning Simulator
- Street gutter
- Waste management in Taiwan
