= Airplane mode (disambiguation) =

Airplane mode is a setting for smartphones.

Airplane mode may also refer to:

- Airplane Mode (2019 film), starring Logan Paul
- Airplane Mode (2020 film), a Brazilian film
- Airplane Mode (video game), a 2020 video game
- Airplane Mode (album), 2026 album by James Blunt
- "Airplane Mode", a song by Flobots from Survival Story
- "Airplane Mode", a song by Limbo from "Holo"
- "Airplane Mode", a song by Fromis 9 from 9 Way Ticket
- Modalità aereo ('Airplane mode'), a 2019 Italian comedy film

== See also ==
- Aircraft dynamic modes, describing the dynamic stability of an aircraft
