= Motorsport Manager 2 =

Upcoming sports management game

- Developer: Playsport Games
- Publisher: Miniclip
- Series: Motorsport Manager
- Engine: Unity
- Platform: Windows
- Release: 2027
- Genre: Sports management
- Mode: Single-player

Motorsport Manager 2 is an upcoming sports management game developed by Playsport Games and published by Miniclip. The game is a direct sequel to the 2016 desktop version of Motorsport Manager, and is set to be released on Windows in 2027.

== Gameplay ==
As with the game's predecessor, Motorsport Manager 2 would support mods via Steam Workshop. In addition to the open-wheel, GT, and endurance series, which reference to Formula One, GT3, and WEC, the motorcycle series would be introduced.

== Development and release ==
Motorsport Manager 2 was announced in June 2026, following the developer Playsport Games regained the rights to the series from Sega. It is a direct sequel to the desktop version of Motorsport Manager released in 2016, and is due to be published by Miniclip. A first official game trailer was received on 30 September 2026. The game is set to be launched on Windows via Steam in 2027.
