= Uncharted Waters (video game) =

1990 video game

Uncharted Waters Daikōkai Jidai
- North American NES box art
- Developer: Koei
- Publisher: Koei
- Composer: Yoko Kanno
- Series: Rekoeition, Uncharted Waters
- Platforms: PC-88, Macintosh, MS-DOS MSX, X68000, NES, Genesis, SNES
- Release: PC-88; May 1990; MS-DOS, Mac, MSX; 1991; NES: JP: March 15, 1991; NA: November 1991 Sega Genesis; JP: April 29, 1992; NA: 1992
- Genre: Role-playing
- Mode: Single-player

Uncharted Waters is a 1990 video game published by Koei. It is the first game in the Uncharted Waters series and was released in Japan under the name Daikōkai Jidai.

== Plot ==
The player plays the game as the character Leon Franco, the young, ambitious son of a noble family fallen on hard times in Portugal. In the storyline, Leon seeks to return glory to his family name.

== Gameplay ==
The goal of the game is to restore the family's former glory and achieve Leon's dreams. Only three nations are represented in the game: Portugal, Spain and the Ottoman Empire. However, there are many neutral ports around the world that the player can "invest" in and thus make part of Portugal's sphere of influence. This, as well as discovering ports and defeating other merchants and pirates in sea battles, increases Leon's fame. With increased fame, Leon can complete tasks for the King of Portugal and gain higher titles of nobility.

== Reception ==
Dave Arneson reviewed the game for Computer Gaming World, and stated that "in the final analysis, Uncharted Waters is mildly interesting as it stands. When compared to what it could have been, it is more than mildly disappointing. Someone may yet design the 'ultimate' game of 16th century exploration, but it isn't here yet". In a 1993 survey of pre 20th-century strategy games the magazine gave the game two stars out of five, stating that while its geography was inaccurate and user interface "could bear improvement", "game play can be interesting".
