= Title Bout Championship Boxing =

Title Bout Championship Boxing 2013
- Developer: P.I.S.D. Ltd
- Publisher: P.I.S.D. Ltd
- Platforms: Mac OS X, Windows, Linux
- Release: 10 June 2013
- Genre: Sports simulation (boxing)
- Mode: Single player

Title Bout Championship Boxing, abbreviated as TBCB, is a text-based boxing simulation that offers historical and fictional play, as well as the ability to forecast upcoming bouts. It is based on the popular 1979 tabletop game of the same name, which was created by Jim and Tom Trunzo.

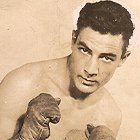
Old Time Prize Fighter

== History ==
"There really wasn't a decent representation of our favourite sport, pro boxing," Jim Trunzo recalls of the decision he and his brother made in the late 1970s to create a game in which players flipped cards to simulate a fight, rather than use the dice or spinners that were prevalent in sports simulations of that era.

The Trunzos self-published the game, with help from Jim Barnes, who had founded the Statis-Pro line of sports simulation games. Barnes had developed what he called a "Fast Action Deck" to simulate the action and had given the Trunzo brothers his blessing to use the same concept in their game.

After the self-published version of Title Bout Championship Boxing barely made its money back, the Trunzos secured a deal with Avalon Hil, which had purchased Statis-Pro and wanted to compete with APBA and Strat-o-matic in the sports simulation space. Avalon Hill had also arranged a marketing partnership with Sports Illustrated to boost its credibility.

Title Bout: The Game of Professional Boxing sold well but was eventually discontinued as gamers moved away from tabletop sports games to computer ones. The Trunzo brothers did not retain the name of their game, but they had the rights to the rest of it and released TKO Boxing for DOS through Lance Haffner Games in 1990. They later published another tabletop game, APBA Boxing, that used dice, and in 2001 Comp-U-Sport brought the game back to the digital realm with Title Fight 2001.

The Trunzos eventually sold the game to OOTP Developments, publishers of Out of the Park Baseball and Franchise Hockey Manager. OOTP released Title Bout Championship Boxing 2 in 2005 and version 2.5 in 2008. In 2013, OOTP sold the game to P.I.S.D. Ltd, which released Title Bout Championship Boxing 2013 in June of that year. Based on comments in the Title Bout community, the initial PISD version was a failed product and fans of the game are still waiting for an update some eight years later.

== Gameplay ==
Title Bout Championship Boxing displays a boxing ring with fighters who trade blows, an immersive blow-by-blow text, a crowd that cheers, and ring card girls who flash up between rounds. The game features over 6,660 boxers past and present and in every weight class, allowing players to not only recreate historical fights but also stage bouts that could never have happened, such as Muhammad Ali taking on Mike Tyson in the prime of their careers, Floyd Mayweather battling the legendary Joe Gans, or Sam Langford trading punches with Marvin Hagler. The game's database is updated on a regular basis, allowing players to also forecast upcoming fights. Acting as promoter you stage fights between all the leading contenders, no exceptions.

Bouts can be simulated once or multiple times, allowing the player to discard outlier events and see how a fight will likely unfold. Players can also set up tournaments and peruse statistics that are tracked fight-by-fight as well as round-by-round, allowing them to see, for example, how many knock-outs have happened in a specific round. Win–loss records can be imported or they can start from 0–0 so all boxers in the game build unique histories.

Title Bout Championship Boxing also has many customisation options, including the ability to import boxer images and add new fighters to the game.
