= Motorsport Manager (video game) =

2016 video game

- Official poster for PC version of the game
- Developer: Playsport Games
- Publisher: Sega (PC)
- Director: Christian West
- Series: Motorsport Manager
- Engine: Unity
- Platforms: iOS, Android, macOS, Windows, Linux, Nintendo Switch
- Release: iOS; 21 August 2014; Android; 2015; macOS, Windows; 9 November 2016; Linux; 23 November 2016; Nintendo Switch; 14 March 2019
- Genres: Simulation, sports management
- Mode: Single-player

Motorsport Manager is a racing management-simulation strategy video game developed by British video game developer, Playsport Games. The game was released on iOS in August 2014 and Android in 2015. A desktop version of the game was published by Sega on macOS, Microsoft Windows and Linux operating systems in November 2016.

The game has received regular updates and patches, including downloadable content on the PC versions, since release. The latest iteration of the game on the PC version was released on 1 November 2017. In March 2019, Motorsport Manager was released for Nintendo Switch.

== Gameplay ==
=== Mobile version ===
The player can begin (and later have the option to continue) a career that places them in control of a motorsport racing team. When starting a new career, the user can customise the team name and colour, before selecting a racing series to enter. There are four tiers of racing series, where each successive tier can be unlocked by winning each respective racing series per tier once. The game features a hints & tips tutorial system, represented by a sprite textbox, written in the character of a moustached man named Nigel (as a homage to former British racing car driver, Nigel Mansell), who provides first-time advice throughout the game. The user also has the ability to invest into a young driver development programme, appointing head engineers and drivers, improving their team headquarters as well as developing their car to get an edge over the competition, all of which can vary in quality depending on investment level. Cash required for investment into such things can be acquired by signing sponsorship deals and completing challenges appointed by sponsors to earn bonus payments, which may vary in quality, difficulty, quantity and contract duration depending on the success and popularity of the user's racing team, with a secondary method being through earning money at the end of the racing season based on the Team Championship scores.

The game also includes a random events system, which may provide choices to the player that can compromise the player's popularity as a manager with one group for the sake of another, or it may provide optional upgrade choices to the three research segments in the game at the cost of cash: Manufacturing - which determines car reliability and tyre wear - Design - which generally affects all aspects of the car - and Aerodynamics - which affects car downforce and acceleration - all of which can trigger at any time during or at the end of a racing season. The user's choices behind-the-scenes ultimately affect their team's racing performances, which is pivotal to success in the game, and serves as the main gameplay element of Motorsport Manager.

There are over a dozen race tracks featured in-game that share the likeness of their real-life counterparts, all of which are split into the respective racing series in the game. Each track used in a racing series roster is split into two parts - a one-time qualifying session and the final race, the team's qualifying performance determines their starting positions in the final race. Challenges set by sponsors may offer the player a considerable sum of cash if they achieve a set position in the leaderboards, which can prove useful to apply any changes to their team in order to give a better chance of success on race day.

Exclusive to the mobile version, micro-transactions that supply customers with set amounts of cash can also accelerate the rate at which their team can improve, reducing the time and challenge required to develop a fully-fledged racing team in the game. The third version included new graphics and camera modes. The third version of the mobile game was the first to have augmented reality (AR), when viewing races.

=== PC version ===
About the PC version, Eurogamer wrote that "It's all been retooled thoughtfully for its debut on PC, Mac and Linux [compared to the original mobile version] - this isn't the mobile game with a few bits of extra bodywork thrown on, and instead is a totally new beast, built from the ground up." Largely similar to the mobile version of the game, the player has the option to either create their own racing team or has the additional option to join a fictional motorsport racing team.

=== Nintendo Switch ===
The 2019 Switch version includes 20 unique circuits and 65 track layouts in a variety of countries, with a New Zealand circuit exclusive to the Switch version. Also exclusive to the Switch version, were higher resolution artwork and 3D cars.

== Development ==
The game was developed by British video game developer, Playsport Games, and published by Sega. On 31 January 2017 the game received modding support via Steam Workshop allowing players to download custom made mods made by the community and change the database of the game to better reflect the real motorsport world, e.g. World Motorsport Championship (Formula One), Asia Pacific Super Cup (Formula Two), and European Racing Series (Formula Three). It also allows players to import custom car models and more via the game's engine Unity.

== Release ==
Motorsport Manager was originally released on mobile for iOS on 21 August 2014. Following considerable success both critically and commercially upon release, the game was released on Android in 2015. The subsequent macOS, Microsoft Windows and Linux desktop versions were published by Sega, following their financial backing of developer Playsport Games, and were released on 9 November 2016 and 23 November 2016 respectively. The desktop versions of the game significantly expanded upon the gameplay mechanics of the mobile version, alleviating the previous hardware constraints put forward by mobile devices, which allowed for a more in-depth gameplay experience with enhanced graphical fidelity, relative to mobile versions of the game. The "Challenge Pack" content, released on 21 August 2017, introduced endurance racing with two-class championships, longer races, driver stamina management, and teams of six drivers. The version for Nintendo Switch was released on March 14, 2019. In the Switch version, which is the console debut for the series, you can build a team with three car classes and compete in nine tiers of racing.

== Reception ==
Reception

Aggregate score
Aggregator	Score
Metacritic	iOS: 88/100; PC: 81/100

Review scores
Publication	Score
PC PowerPlay	8/10 (PC)
GameStar	83% (PC)
Pocket Gamer	9/10 (iOS)
TouchArcade	4.5/5 (iOS)

=== Mobile version ===
The iOS version of Motorsport Manager received positive reviews from critics. J.D. Cohen of TouchArcade awarded the game a score of 4.5 out of 5, writing: "It's never overwhelming, nor is it too light to maintain interest. Motorsport Manager finds a nice spot in the complexity spectrum wherein it requires frequent decision-making, without ever inducing paralysis by presenting too many options simultaneously."

Pocket Gamer's Harry Slater writes: "This is the ice cold nature of Motorsport Manager. One second you can be flying high in first place, the next your tyres fail you and you slip back to fifth, cursing as you do. ... Things do get a little repetitive, but there's a huge game to work your way through here, and if it gets its claws into you it's unlikely to let go for a good long while. Motorsport Manager manages to walk the line between number-juggling sims and the softer end of the spectrum, and in doing so creates a strategy game that almost anyone can have a crack at." The website awarded a score of 9/10. The game sold over 1.6 million copies on both iOS and Android.

Pocket Gamer gave Motorsport Manager Mobile 3, released in July 2018, a 4.5/5 score and a positive review, saying the changes between 2 and 3 were significant. In February 2020, Tech Radar named Motorsport Manager Mobile 3 one of the best Android games of the year. The publication called it "a big leap on from the relatively simplistic original Motorsport Manager Mobile." Motorsport Manager 3 was also given a positive review by Kotaku, saying the presentation was interesting and easy to navigate. While Vice praised gameplay, it did say the game made it too easy to succeed, saying "without that risk frustration, that little taste of sacrifice and the threat of encroaching despair, it's never feels quite like racing." Top Gear called MMM3 "streamlined and intuitive." The review also called it "far less involved game than the PC version of Motorsport Manager, better suited to bus rides, train journeys and studiously ignoring your family by the pool on holiday."

=== PC version ===
==== Pre-release ====
Websites that early-tested the game gave it very positive reviews. In May 2016, PC Gamer's Sean Clever wrote: "It's a niche subgenre, and one I didn't expect to see outside of an FIA licence, but this seems like a decent first effort to put racing management games back on the grid." In August 2016, IGN's Luke Reilly stated: "It's an incredibly nuanced experience and, while it's initially rather intimidating, Motorsport Manager has successfully got its tentacles around me after several sessions with an early version of the game. ... I also like the pressure of race day and the genuinely stressful situations that can arise."

==== Post-release ====
The game received positive reviews after release. Eurogamer.net's Martin Robinson reports the lack of the ability to save or copy racing set-ups, and writes: "Such an approachable veneer disguises an otherwise complex, sometimes cruel and a little too often abstruse experience. Managing the strategies of two cars - and micromanaging each driver to boot - can prove to be a taxing task, and while it's satisfying to execute the perfect strategy there aren't quite enough tools at your disposal to balance out the frustration that often accompanies raceday. The feedback you're given by drivers is a little too obscure, the ability to read lap times and deltas a little too sparse to make chasing the perfect set-up anything other than a dark art. ... Motorsport Manager's a couple of tweaks away from greatness, then, but it's far from a disappointment."

On GameStar, Benjamin Danneberg says: "Motorsport Manager is not a hardcore management game, where I have to put every screw correctly. Instead, the game is a healthy way of strategy and fun." Motorsport.com's Valentin Khorounzhiy writes: "Motorsport Manager is a great game on its own merit and a roaring success for a subgenre that seems to be waking up from a long hiatus. Its price tag may seem steep to some, but it's got enough content and variety to justify it. ... There's potential for improvement, yes, but Playsport has done an admirable job with the first installment – and it will hopefully move enough copies to justify many, many follow-ups."

James Swinbanks of PC PowerPlay writes: "There is always something going on behind the scenes in Motorsport Manager, and it always adds to the experience. I never felt cheated, even when things didn't go my way. ... It's not perfect; a few setup quirks, like increasing rear wing angle adding understeer, don't make any sense and had me scratching my head trying to work out why they might design it that way. But in the grand scheme of things, Motorsport Manager does what I want it to do. It puts me on the pit wall, in the thick of it." The website gave a score of 8/10. DSport Magazine gave the first PC version a positive response in its review, noting the level of micromanaging was scalable depending on how intensive the player wanted the strategizing to be.

=== Nintendo Switch ===
In March 2019, Pocket Gamer positively gave a review about the port of Motorsport Manager 3 to Switch. It said, positively, that the gameplay was similar to the mobile version. It described a more complicated control scheme allowed through hotkeys on controllers, and the ability to see tiny models of cars instead of dots on the maps.
