= Half Sword =

Upcoming video game

- Developer: Half Sword Games
- Publisher: Game Seer Publishing
- Engine: Unreal Engine 5
- Platform: Windows
- Release: January 30, 2026 (early access)
- Genres: Fighting game, simulation
- Mode: Single-player

Half Sword is a physics-based medieval combat simulator, developed by Georgian studio Half Sword Games and published by Game Seer; it is widely known for its immersive physical fighting simulation and medieval aesthetic. A demo version of the game is available on Steam and Epic Games Store on Microsoft Windows. The game released into early access on January 30, 2026.

== Gameplay ==
The player controls a human through freeform "ragdoll" controls, performed primarily by directional mouse movements. The player is placed into an arena, where their goal is to eliminate other fighters, using late medieval weapons and armour. The game can be played in several game modes, such as the Progression mode, where the player unlocks more and more advanced challenges and items over time, starting only with their fists as a weapon; Abyss mode, where the player is sent after dying in progression mode to fight with undead enemies, and Free Mode, where the player is free to choose their armoury, weapons and opponents.

In progression mode, by winning matches, the player will increase their rank, starting with "Beggar", this progression will unlock new arenas, armor and apparel as well as more complex and dangerous weapons with each rank.

== Development ==
Player armed with a sword and wearing armour looking at a group of their opponents fighting.

The original idea was given by one of the developers, who practised Historical European Martial Arts, and had an idea for the game since his first projects in Unreal Engine. Later, he remade the project several times after its first prototypes in 2019-2020, until eventually coming to the full physical simulation as the main mechanic. After he returned from Japan to his homeland country of Georgia in 2024, he founded a studio, consisting out of 10 people from different countries like Argentina, India, Sweden or UK.

== Reception ==
The game was widely described as "utterly silly", but "very realistic" and brutal. About 10,000 videos featuring Half Sword were uploaded across various platforms, along with the game collecting over 400,000 wishlists on Steam after the first 6 months of available demo. After the release of the early access, Half Sword received "mixed" reviews due to high expectations of the audience, highlighting several major problems, such as bad ragdoll system, very poor optimisation and the absence of some features shown in the trailer. Rick Lane from PC Gamer explained this dissatisfaction of players by sudden changes from the previously presented tech demo, but "it doesn't help when your own marketing contributes directly to wrong expectations". On launch, the number of concurrent players exceeded 20,000 players.
