= Motorsport Manager =

Sports management video game series

- logo of the series
- Genre: Sports management
- Developer: Playsport Games
- Publishers: Miniclip; Sega
- Platforms: Android; iOS; Linux; macOS; Nintendo Switch; Windows
- First release: Motorsport Manager; 21 August 2014
- Latest release: Motorsport Manager Mobile 4; 14 September 2023

Motorsport Manager is a sports management video game series by Playsport Games. The series has received several titles, with an upcoming entry, Motorsport Manager 2, scheduled to be released in 2027.

== Games ==
=== Motorsport Manager ===
Motorsport Manager was initially released on iOS in 2014 and Android in 2015. A desktop version of the game was published by Sega and released on macOS, Microsoft Windows and Linux in November 2016.

=== Motorsport Manager Mobile 2 ===
Official logo of Motorsport Manager Mobile 2

A sequel to the mobile version of Motorsport Manager was released to positive reception on 13 July 2017. Motorsport Manager Mobile 2 was praised for being "more technical" than the first game, providing "many more settings to choose from" compared to the original mobile version.

The main additions from the original, aside from enhancements in graphical fidelity, include the ability for the player to control individual car part design, engine modes, extra tyre compounds, more downforce options, and an expanded sponsorship system.

=== Motorsport Manager Mobile 3 ===
Motorsport Manager Mobile 3 was announced with a clip posted on 10 July 2018, adding Endurance and GT Championships beyond the Formula series, along with other newer features. MMM3 introduced six new championships.

The game had now introduced to it the Open Wheel Sprint Championship which would feature in the fourth tier in the Open Wheel Racing class along with the already pre-existing European Racing Series, Asia-Pacific SuperCup and World Motorsport Championship, third to first tiers respectively. For the GT series, the GT Rising Stars is featured in fourth tier, the GT Challenger Series is featured in the third tier, while the International GT Championship is featured in the second tier. For the Endurance series, which involves three drivers per car, the International Endurance Cup Class B is featured in the third tier, while the higher class, the International Endurance Cup, is featured in the second tier.

=== Motorsport Manager Mobile 4 ===
Motorsport Manager Mobile 4 was released in 2023, as a rival to F1 Manager 2023 by Frontier Developments.

=== Motorsport Manager 2 ===
Motorsport Manager 2 was announced in June 2026 and is set to be released on Windows in 2027.
