= Airplane Mode (video game) =

2020 video game

- Developers: Hosni Auji; Bacronym
- Publisher: AMC Games
- Platforms: Windows; macOS
- Release: October 15, 2020
- Genre: Simulation
- Mode: Single-player

Airplane Mode is a 2020 simulation video game developed by American developers Hosni Auji and Bacronym and published by AMC Games. It was released on October 15, 2020, for Windows and macOS. In the game, players control a plane passenger as they go on a flight that lasts multiple hours in real time. The player can watch movies and perform other tasks such as eating in-flight meals and drawing as they wait out the duration of the flight. The game received mixed reviews from critics.

== Gameplay ==
Airplane Mode is a simulation video game. Players control a plane passenger as they go on a flight that lasts multiple hours in real time. They can choose to go on either a two and a half hour flight, or a five-hour flight to Iceland. While on their chosen flight, players can perform several activities. They can play blackjack and solitaire through in-flight entertainment screens, or watch public domain films, which include the Merrie Melodies cartoon The Wabbit Who Came to Supper. Crossword puzzles are available through an airline magazine. The player can also access their own personal cell phone, which can be used to listen to podcasts and music. Some random events occur across the flight, including travel delays and turbulence.

== Release and reception ==
Development of Airplane Mode began in 2017. The game was influenced by Desert Bus, a video game from Penn & Teller's Smoke and Mirrors, in which players drive a bus from Tucson to Las Vegas in real time. Bennett Foddy voices the captain of the game's aircraft and provides its announcements. The lead developer Hosni Auji wanted to replicate the experience of flying on an airline, while including various scenarios that the average person would witness while flying. Due to licensing problems, the developers chose to include public domain movies as part of the in-flight entertainment system. A trailer was released in 2019, and the game was released on October 15, 2020, for Windows and macOS.

According to the review aggregator website Metacritic, Airplane Mode received "mixed or average reviews". In a review for Shacknews, Mega Ran praised the game's graphics and voice acting, but found the game to be monotonous, writing that it "just captures a super boring part of real life". The Games Machine appreciated the game's faithfulness to its premise, but agreed that the game was a boring experience.

== See also ==
- Rawdog Simulator
