= History of Microsoft Flight Simulator =

Microsoft Flight Simulator began as a set of articles on computer graphics, written by Bruce Artwick throughout 1976, about flight simulation using 3-D graphics. When the editor of the magazine told Artwick that subscribers were interested in purchasing such a program, Artwick founded Sublogic Corporation to commercialize his ideas. At first the new company sold flight simulators through mail order, but that changed in January 1979 with the release of Flight Simulator (FS) for the Apple II. They soon followed this up with versions for other systems and from there it evolved into a long-running series of computer flight simulators.

== Sublogic flight simulators ==
=== First generation (Apple II, TRS-80) ===
− January 1980 for Apple II
− Later 1980 for TRS-80

=== Second generation (Color Computer 3, Apple II, C64, Atari 8-bit) ===
− December 1983 for Apple II
− June 1984 for Commodore 64
− October 1984 for Atari 8-bit computers
− Sometime in 1987 for Color Computer 3

=== Third generation (Amiga, Atari ST, Mac) ===
− March 1986 for Mac
− November 1986 for Amiga and Atari ST

In 1984, Amiga Corporation asked Artwick to port Flight Simulator for its forthcoming computer, but Commodore's purchase of Amiga temporarily ended the relationship. Sublogic instead finished a Macintosh version, released by Microsoft, then resumed work on the Amiga and Atari ST versions. Although still called Flight Simulator II, the Amiga and Atari ST versions compare favorably with Microsoft Flight Simulator 3.0. Notable features included a windowing system allowing multiple simultaneous 3d views - including exterior views of the aircraft itself - and (on the Amiga and Atari ST) modem play.

Info gave the Amiga version five out of five, describing it as the "finest incarnation". Praising the "superb" graphics, the magazine advised to "BEGIN your game collection with this one!"

== Microsoft Flight Simulator ==
=== Flight Simulator ===
− Released in November 1982

=== Flight Simulator 2.0 ===
FS 2.0 – Scenery coverage includes the entire United States.

− Released in 1984

In 1984, Microsoft released their version 2 for IBM PCs. This version made small improvements to the original version, including the graphics and a more precise simulation in general. It added joystick and mouse input, as well as support for RGB monitors (4-color CGA graphics), the IBM PCjr, and (in later versions) Hercules graphics, and LCD displays for laptops. The new simulator expanded the scenery coverage to include a model of the entire United States, although the airports were limited to the same areas as in Flight Simulator 1. Over the next year or two, compatibility with Sublogic Scenery Disks was provided, gradually covering the whole U.S. (including Hawaii), Japan, and part of Europe.

=== Flight Simulator 3.0 ===
FS 3.0 – Many more buildings and additional aircraft. For the first time, users had an option to view the aircraft from the outside. A Cessna Skylane flying over Chicago is shown here.

− Released in mid-1988

Microsoft Flight Simulator 3 improved the flight experience by adding additional aircraft and airports to the simulated area found in Flight Simulator 2, as well as improved high-res (EGA) graphics, and other features lifted from the Amiga/ST versions.

The three simulated aircraft were the Gates Learjet 25, Cessna Skylane, and Sopwith Camel. Flight Simulator 3 also allowed the user to customize the display; multiple windows, each displaying one of several views, could be positioned and sized on the screen. The supported views included the instrument and control panel, a map view, and various external camera angles.

This version included a program to convert the old series of Sublogic Scenery Disks into scenery files (known as SCN files), which could then be copied to the FS3 directory, allowing the user to expand the FS world.

=== Flight Simulator 4.0 ===
FS 4.0 – Now with dynamic scenery, more detailed roads, bridges, and buildings. Allowed users to design their own aircraft.

− Released in late 1989

Version 4 followed in 1989, and brought several improvements over Flight Simulator 3. These included improved aircraft models, random weather patterns, a new sailplane, and dynamic scenery (non-interactive air and ground traffic on and near airports moving along static prerecorded paths). The basic version of FS4 was available for Macintosh computers in 1991. Like FS3, this version included an upgraded converter for the old Sublogic Scenery Disks into SCN files.

A large series of add-on products were produced for FS4 between 1989 and 1993. First from Microsoft and the Bruce Artwick Organization (BAO) came the Aircraft and Scenery Designer (ASD) integration module. This allowed FS4 users to build custom scenery units known as SC1 files which could be used within FS4 and traded with other users. Also, with the provided Aircraft Designer Module, the user could select one of two basic type aircraft frames (prop or jet) and customize flight envelope details and visual aspects. ASD provided additional aircraft including a Boeing 747 with a custom dash/cockpit (which required running in 640 × 350 resolution).

Mallard Software and BAO released the Sound, Graphics, and Aircraft Upgrade (SGA), which added digital and synth sound capability (on compatible hardware) to FS4. A variety of high resolution modes also became available for specific types of higher end video cards and chipsets, thus supplying running resolutions up to 800 × 600. As with ASD, the SGA upgrade also came with some additional aircraft designed by BAO, including an Ultra-light.

Another addition was known as the Aircraft Adventure Factory (AAF), which had two components. The first, the Aircraft Factory, was a Windows-based program allowing custom design aircraft shapes to be used within FS4 utilizing a CAD-type interface, supported by various sub menu and listing options. Once the shape was created and colors assigned to the various pieces, it could be tied to an existing saved flight model as was designed in the Aircraft Designer module. The other component of AAF was the Adventure module. Using a simple language, a user could design and compile a script that could access such things as aircraft position, airspeed, altitude, and aircraft flight characteristics.

Other add-on products (most published by Mallard Software) included: The Scenery Enhancement Edition (SEE4), which further enhanced SC1 files and allowed for AF objects to be used as static objects within SEE4; Pilots Power Tools (PPT), which greatly eased the management of the many aircraft and scenery files available; and finally, a variety of new primary scenery areas created by MicroScene, including Hawaii (MS-1), Tahiti (MS-2), Grand Canyon (MS-3), and Japan (MS-4). Scenery files produced by Sublogic could also be used with FS4, including Sublogic's final USA East and West scenery collections.

=== Flight Simulator 5.0 ===
− Released in late 1993

Flight Simulator 5.0 is the first version of the series to use textures. This allowed FS5 to achieve a much higher degree of realism than the previous flat-shaded simulators. This also made all add-on scenery and aircraft for the previous versions obsolete, as they would look out of place.

The bundled scenery was expanded (now including parts of Europe). Improvements were made to the included aircraft models, the weather system's realism, and artificial intelligence. The coordinate system introduced in Flight Simulator 1 was revamped, and the scenery format was migrated from the old SCN/SC1 to the new and more complex BGL format.

More noticeable improvements included the use of digital audio for sound effects, custom cockpits for each aircraft (previous versions had one cockpit that was slightly modified to fit various aircraft), and better graphics.

It took about a year for add-on developers to get to grips with the new engine, but when they did they were not only able to release scenery, but also tools like Flightshop that made it feasible for users to design new objects.

==== Flight Simulator 5.1 ====
− Released in 1995

In 1995, Flight Simulator 5.1 was introduced, adding the ability to handle scenery libraries including wide use of satellite imagery, faster performance, and a barrage of weather effects: storms, 3D clouds, and fog became true-to-life elements in the Flight Simulator world. This edition was also the first version that was released on CD-ROM and the last for DOS. This was released in June 1995.

In the fall of 1995, with the release of the Flight shop program, nearly any aircraft could be built. The French program "Airport" was also available for free which allowed users to build airports (FS5.1 only had 250 Worldwide) and other designers were doing custom aircraft cockpit panels. This all made for a huge amount of "freeware" to be released to be downloaded and added to the FS5.1 simulator. Forums such as CompuServe, Avsim, and Flightsim.com acted as libraries for uploads and discussion.

In November 1995, Microsoft acquired the Bruce Artwick Organization (BAO), Ltd from Bruce Artwick. Employees were moved to Redmond, WA, and development of Microsoft Flight Simulator continued.

=== Flight Simulator for Windows 95 ===
FS95 (6.0) – More scenery and aircraft. Notice the texture mapped runway, aircraft, and sky, and high density of 3-D buildings.

− Released in late-1996

With the release of Windows 95, a new version (6.0) was developed for that platform. Although this was essentially just a port from the DOS version (FS5.1), it did feature a vastly improved frame-rate, better haze, and additional aircraft, including the Extra 300 aerobatic aircraft.

Instead of using the version number in the title, Microsoft instead called it "Flight Simulator for Windows 95" to advertise the change in operating system. It is often abbreviated as "FS95" or "FSW95".

This was the first version released after the purchase of BAO by Microsoft, and after having physically relocated development of the BAO development staff to Microsoft's primary campus in Redmond, Washington. The BAO team was integrated with other non-BAO Microsoft staff, such as project management, testing, and artwork.

Additional scenery included major airports outside Europe and the US for the first time.

=== Flight Simulator 98 ===
− Released on September 16, 1997

Flight Simulator 98 (version 6.1), abbreviated as FS98, is generally regarded as a "service release", offering minor improvements, with a few notable exceptions: The simulator now also featured a helicopter (the Bell 206B III JetRanger), as well as a generally improved interface for adding additional aircraft, sceneries, and sounds.

Other new "out of the box" aircraft included a revised Cessna 182 with a photorealistic instrument panel and updated flight model. The primary rationale for updating the 182 was Cessna's return to manufacturing that model in the late 1990s. The Learjet Model 45 business jet was also included, replacing the aging Learjet 35 from earlier versions. The Dynamic Scenery models were also vastly improved. One of the most noticeable improvements in this version was the ability to have independent panels and sounds for every aircraft.

A major expansion of the in-box scenery was also included in this release, including approximately 45 detailed cities (many located outside the United States, some of which had been included in separate scenery enhancement packs), as well as an increase in the modeled airports to over 3000 worldwide, compared with the approximately 300 in earlier versions. This major increase in scenery production was attributable partially to inclusion of the content from previous standalone scenery packs, as well as new contributions by MicroScene, a company in San Ramon, California who had developed several scenery expansions released by Microsoft.

This release also included support for the Microsoft SideWinder Pro Force Feedback joystick, which allowed the player to receive some sensory input from simulated trim forces on the aircraft controls.

This was the first version to take advantage of 3D-graphic cards, through Microsoft's DirectX technology. With such combination of hardware and software, FS98 not only achieved better performance, but also implemented better haze/visibility effects, "virtual cockpit" views, texture filtering, and sunrise/sunset effects.

By November 1997, Flight Simulator 98 had shipped one million units, following its September launch. It received a "Gold" award from the Verband der Unterhaltungssoftware Deutschland (VUD) in August 1998, for sales of at least 100,000 units across Germany, Austria, and Switzerland. The VUD raised it to "Platinum" status, indicating 200,000 sales, by November.

=== Flight Simulator 2000 ===
− Released in late 1999

Flight Simulator 2000 (version 7.0), abbreviated as FS2000, was released as a major improvement over the previous versions, and was also offered in two versions: One version for "normal" users, and one "pro" version with additional aircraft. Although many users had high expectations when this version arrived, many were disappointed when they found out that the simulator demanded high-end hardware; the minimum requirements were only a Pentium 166 MHz computer, although 400–500 MHz computer was deemed necessary to have an even framerate. However, even on a high-end system, stuttering framerate was a problem, especially when performing sharp turns in graphically dense areas. Also, the visual damage effects introduced in FS5 were disabled, and continued to be unavailable in versions after FS2000. While the visual damage effects were still in the game, Microsoft disabled them through the game's configuration files. Users can re-enable the damage effects through modifications. FS2000 also introduced computer controlled aircraft in some airports.

This version also introduced 3D elevation, making it possible to adjust the elevation for the scenery grids, thus making most of the previous scenery obsolete (as it didn't support this feature). A GPS was also added, enabling an even more realistic operation of the simulator. FS2000 also upgraded its dynamic scenery, with more detailed models and AI that allowed aircraft to yield to other aircraft to avoid incursions while taxiing.

FS2000 included an improved weather system, which featured precipitation for the first time in the form of either snow or rain, as well as other new features such as the ability to download real-world weather.

New aircraft in FS2000 included the supersonic Aerospatiale-BAC Concorde (prominently featured on both editions' box covers) and the Boeing 777 which had recently entered service at the time.

An often overlooked, but highly significant milestone in Flight Simulator 2000, was the addition of over 17,000 new airports, for a total exceeding 20,000 worldwide, as well as worldwide navigational aid coverage. This greatly expanded the utility of the product in simulating long international flights as well as instrument-based flight relying on radio navigation aids. Some of these airports, along with additional objects such as radio towers and other "hazard" structures, were built from publicly available U.S. government databases. Others, particularly the larger commercial airports with detailed apron and taxiway structures, were built from detailed information in Jeppesen's proprietary database, one of the primary commercial suppliers of worldwide aviation navigation data.

In combination, these new data sources in Flight Simulator allowed the franchise to claim the inclusion of virtually every documented airport and navigational aid in the world, as well as allowing implementation of the new GPS feature. As was the case with FS98, scenery development using these new data sources in FS2000 was outsourced to MicroScene in San Ramon, working with the core development team at Microsoft.

The air traffic control system first featured in Flight Simulator 2002 was originally scheduled for inclusion in this version, but eventually postponed due to performance issues.

Microsoft Flight Simulator 2000 was the last of the Flight Simulator series to support the Windows 95 and Windows NT 4.0 operating systems.

=== Flight Simulator 2002 ===
− Released in October 2001

Flight Simulator 2002 (version 8.0), abbreviated as FS2002, improved vastly over previous versions. In addition to improved graphics, FS2002 introduced air traffic control (ATC) and artificial intelligence (AI) aircraft enabling users to fly alongside computer-controlled aircraft and communicate with airports. An option for a target framerate was added, enabling a cap on the framerate to reduce stutter while performing texture loading and other maintenance tasks. In addition, the 3D Virtual Cockpit feature from FS98 was re-added in a vastly improved form, creating in effect a view of the cockpit from the viewpoint of a real pilot. The external view also featured an inertia effect, inducing an illusion of movement in a realistic physical environment. The simulation runs smoother than Flight Simulator 2000, even on comparable hardware. A free copy of Fighter Ace 2 was also included with the software.

=== Flight Simulator 2004: A Century of Flight ===
− Released in July 2003

Flight Simulator 2004: A Century of Flight (version 9.0), also known as FS9 or FS2004, was shipped with several historical aircraft such as the Wright Flyer, Ford Tri-Motor, and the Douglas DC-3 to commemorate the 100th anniversary of the Wright Brothers' first flight. The program included an improved weather engine that provided true three-dimensional clouds and true localized weather conditions for the first time. The engine also allowed users to download weather information from actual weather stations, allowing the simulator to synchronize the weather with the real world. Other enhancements from the previous version included better ATC communications, GPS equipment, interactive virtual cockpits, and more variety in autogen such as barns, street lights, silos, etc. This version was the first to include worldwide taxiway signs by default.

Flight Simulator 2004 is also the last version to include and feature Meigs Field as its default airport. The airport was closed on March 30, 2003, and the airport was removed in the subsequent releases. It is also the last version to support Windows 98/9x series of operating systems.

=== Flight Simulator X ===
− Released in October 2006

Flight Simulator X (version 10.0), abbreviated as FSX, is the tenth edition in the Flight Simulator franchise. It features new aircraft, improved multiplayer support, including the ability for two players to fly a single plane, and players to occupy a control tower available in the Deluxe Edition, and improved scenery with higher resolution ground textures.

FSX includes fewer aircraft than FS2004, but incorporates new aircraft such as the Airbus A321, Maule Orion, Boeing 737-800 (replacing the aging Boeing 737-400), Beechcraft King Air and Bombardier CRJ700. The expansion pack, named Acceleration, was released later, which includes new missions, aircraft, and other updates. The Deluxe edition of Flight Simulator X includes the Software Development Kit (SDK), which contains an object placer, allowing the game's autogen and full scenery library to be used in missions or add-on scenery. Finally, the ability to operate the control surfaces of aircraft with the mouse was reintroduced after it was removed in FS2002.

Previous versions did not allow great circle navigation at latitudes higher than 60 degrees (north or south), and at around 75-80 degrees north–south it became impossible to "fly" closer to the poles, whichever compass heading was followed. This problem is solved in FSX. Users may now navigate through any great circle as well as "fly" across both the Arctic and Antarctic. This version also adds the option to have a transparent panel.

FSX is the first of the series to be released exclusively on DVD-ROM due to space constraints. This is also the first in the series that calls for the preparing process known as activating. Through the internet or a phone a hardware number is generated, and a corresponding code is then used to lock the DVD to one single computer only. It also requires a significantly more powerful computer to run smoothly, even on low graphical settings. Users have reported that the game is "CPU-bound" - a powerful processor is generally more helpful in increasing performance than a powerful graphics card.

Meigs Field in Chicago was removed following its sudden destruction in 2003, while Kai Tak Airport in Hong Kong, which had closed in 1998, remained.

FSX is the last version of Microsoft Flight Simulator to support Windows XP, Vista, 7, 8, and 8.1 as Microsoft Flight Simulator (2020) only works on Windows 10 and 11.

==== Flight Simulator X: Acceleration ====
− Released in October 2007

Microsoft released their first expansion pack for Flight Simulator in years, called Flight Simulator X: Acceleration, to the US market on October 23, 2007, and released to the Australian market on November 1, 2007. Unlike the base game, which is rated E, Acceleration is rated E10+ in the US.

Acceleration introduces new features, including multiplayer air racing, new missions, and three all-new aircraft, the F/A-18A Hornet, EH-101 helicopter, and P-51D Mustang. In many product reviews, users complained of multiple bugs in the initial release of the pack. One of the bugs, that occurs only in the Standard Edition, is the Maule Air Orion aircraft used in the mission has missing gauges and other problems, as it is a Deluxe Version-only aircraft.

The new scenery enhancements cover Berlin, Istanbul, Cape Canaveral, and Edwards Air Force Base, providing high accuracy both in the underlying photo texture (60 cm/pixel) and in the detail given to the 3D objects.

Flight Simulator X: Acceleration can take advantage of Windows Vista, Windows 7, and DirectX 10 as well.

The expansion pack includes code from both service packs, thus installing them is unnecessary.

==== Flight Simulator X: Steam Edition (Dovetail Games) ====
− Released in December 2014

On 9 July 2014, Dovetail Games announced a licensing agreement with Microsoft to distribute Microsoft Flight Simulator X: Steam Edition and to develop further products based on Microsoft's technology for the entertainment market.

Dovetail released Microsoft Flight Simulator X: Steam Edition on 18 December 2014. It is a re-release of Flight Simulator X: Gold Edition, which includes the Deluxe and Acceleration packs and both Service Packs. It includes "all standard Steam functionality", and replaces the GameSpy multiplayer system with Steam's multiplayer system.

While FSX: Steam Edition remains on sale, Dovetail also released a new flight simulation franchise, Flight Sim World. The company originally planned to bring this game to market in 2015. However, the program became available in 2017. In April 2018, Flight Sim World development was closed, and sales ended in May 2018.

=== Flight Simulator (2020) ===
− Released in August 2020

The latest entry to the series was first revealed in June 2019, at Microsoft's E3 2019 conference. Soon after the announcement, Microsoft Studios made available to the public its Microsoft Flight Simulator Insider Program webpage, where participants could subscribe to news, offer feedback, access a private forum, and be eligible to participate in Alpha and Beta releases of the game.

Flight Simulator (2020) features significantly more scenery detail, accurately modelling virtually every part of the world. The simulation also includes vastly more sophisticated aircraft, with nearly complete simulations of aircraft systems, overhead panels and flight management computers (FMCs) in commercial jet airliners; features which were highly incomplete in previous versions.

The new Flight Simulator uses satellite data and Azure AI. It features high fidelity shadow generation and reflections on aircraft surfaces, busy airports with animated vehicles and people, complex cloud formations, defined shorelines and water bodies, realistic effects on the aircraft's windshield, and detailed terrain generation with a vast amount of autogenerated scenery.

The official website for the game states: "Microsoft Flight Simulator is the next generation of one of the most beloved simulation franchises. From light planes to wide-body jets, fly highly detailed and stunning aircraft in an incredibly realistic world. Create your flight plan and fly anywhere on the planet. Enjoy flying day or night and face realistic, challenging weather conditions."

The game was released for Windows on August 18, 2020, through Xbox Game Pass and Steam on PC. Microsoft Flight Simulator 2020 was released on Xbox Series S/X on July 27, 2021.

=== Flight Simulator 2024 ===
− Released in November 2024

On June 11, 2023, Microsoft announced Flight Simulator 2024, releasing a 2-minute announcement trailer on Twitter during Xbox Showcase.

Some of the new features are real world aviation scenarios, such as skydiving operations, aerial firefighting, and executive transport missions.

The game released on November 19, 2024. Many players faced issues loading the game on launch day, causing the game to a receive an "Overwhelmingly Negative" rating on Steam after its release.

== Microsoft Flight ==
− Released in February 2012

On August 17, 2009, Microsoft announced a new flight simulator, Microsoft Flight, designed to replace the Microsoft Flight Simulator series. New to Flight is Games for Windows – Live integration, replacing the GameSpy client which was used in previous installments.

An add-on market place was implemented as well, offering some additional scenery packs and aircraft as downloadable content (DLC). The new version was aimed at current flight simulator fans, as well as novice players. However, Flight has a different internal architecture and operational philosophy, and is not compatible with the previous Flight Simulator series.

Some users and critics such as Flying Magazine were disappointed with the product, the main issue being that the product is a game, rather than a simulator, to attract a casual audience rather than enthusiasts who would want a more realistic experience.

On July 25, 2012, Microsoft announced it had cancelled further development of Microsoft Flight, stating that this was part of "the natural ebb and flow" of application management. The company stated it will continue to support the community and offer Flight as a free download, but closed down all further development of the product on 26 July 2012.

== Products based on the Flight Simulator X codebase ==
=== Lockheed Martin Prepar3D ===
In 2009, Lockheed Martin announced that they had negotiated with Microsoft to purchase the intellectual property and including source code for Microsoft ESP which was the commercial-use version of Flight Simulator X SP2. In 2010 Lockheed announced that the new product based upon the ESP source code would be called Prepar3D. Lockheed has hired members of the original ACES Studios team to continue development of the product. Most Flight Simulator X addons as well as the default FSX aircraft work in Prepar3D without any adjustment since Prepar3D is kept backward compatible. The first version was released on 1 November 2010.

=== Dovetail Games Flight Sim World ===
In May 2017, Dovetail Games announced Flight Sim World, based on the codebase of Flight Simulator X, and released later that month. Only a year later, on April 23, 2018, Dovetail announced end of development of Flight Sim World and the end of sales effective May 15, 2018.

== Reception ==
In 1989, Video Games & Computer Entertainment reported that Flight Simulator was "unquestionably the most popular computer game in the world, with nearly two million copies sold."
