= Rawdog Simulator =

2024 video game

Rawdog Simulator is a simulation game about rawdogging a flight. The game was first released in August 2024.

== Original trend ==
In the context of travel, rawdogging is to travel without distraction, most often by flight. Interpretations vary, but this generally means avoiding phones, computers, magazines, and other in-flight entertainment. Other versions also forbid food, water, and sleep, with only the flight map being permitted for entertainment. The trend first gained widespread use, along with its name, on TikTok in 2024, but it may go back to an episode of Seinfeld.

== Gameplay ==
The game simulates rawdogging a flight from New York to Singapore. The player takes a seat onboard Rawdog Airlines Flight 69 and the captain informs them to ensure that "phones, laptops and sources of dopamine are safely stowed away".

The game then requests access to the player's webcam to verify that the player is watching their screen. Should the player be caught looking away from their screen, a 5 second warning is displayed before the game ends.

== Reception ==
The game was met with a confused reception online. The Independent called it "addictive" and said that it appears to be satirical.

Gizmodo called the idea "inarguably stupid", View from the Wing called it "outrageous", and a writer for Creative Bloq begged to "Please never make me play Rawdog Simulator again".

== See also ==
- Airplane Mode (video game)
