= Schedule I (video game) =

Early access video game

- Promotional poster
- Developer: TVGS
- Publisher: TVGS
- Engine: Unity
- Platform: Windows
- Release: 24 March 2025 (early access)
- Genre: Economic simulation
- Modes: Single-player, multiplayer

Schedule I is an upcoming open world crime simulator video game developed by Australian developer TVGS (Tyler's Video Game Studio). Released in early access on 24 March 2025 for Windows, the game combines business management, tactical strategy, and dark comedy as players build and expand a drug trafficking operation in the fictional city of Hyland Point. The game gained popularity from being livestreamed on Twitch and TikTok.

== Title ==
"Schedule I" is a category of drugs in U.S. that are classified as substances with no currently accepted medical use and a high potential for abuse. Examples include heroin, LSD, MDMA (ecstasy), methaqualone, and peyote.

"Schedule 1" and "Schedule 2" is also used in the Australian state of Queensland to delineate between severity of prosecution for illicit substances, with crimes related to schedule 1 substances facing harsher penaltie

s. Examples include: LSD and Heroin under schedule 1, while cannabis, and morphine are under schedule 2.

== Gameplay ==
Schedule I is a first person game where players assume the role of a drug dealer in the fictional city of Hyland Point. Players grow and manufacture various strains of marijuana, methamphetamine, cocaine, and psilocybin mushrooms, which can be sold to the city's residents. Drugs can be mixed with various ingredients (such as soft drinks or paracetamol) in order to increase their sell value and create unusual comedic effects when smoked, ranging from changing hair color to creating explosions. Players must avoid police officers while selling drugs and are subject to random searches, road blocks, and curfews. If the player is spotted breaking the law they will be "wanted" and subject to arrest, in a system similar to the Grand Theft Auto series. As the game progresses, players can expand their business by hiring various employees such as dealers, cooks, janitors, and botanists; as well as purchasing properties for drug manufacturing and front businesses for money laundering.

In addition to the base game content, the game has an active modding community.

== Story ==
The game opens with the player living in the desert with their uncle Nelson. After completing the tutorial, Nelson is arrested by the police. The player escapes in an RV and moves to Hyland Point. After Nelson calls from prison, the player's RV is blown up by the Benzies, a rival cartel, who leave a note warning the player to stay out of their territory. After renting a motel room, the player is left to their own devices while Nelson provides guidance over a payphone.

Once they have gained access to meth and made progress in the second region of Hyland Point, the player is contacted by the Benzies leader, Thomas, who arranges a meeting. He offers a truce to the player, where in exchange for the latter producing product for them every 2–3 weeks, the Benzies will refrain from attacking them and their dealers; however, this will lock the player out of the rest of the unlockable areas, which are considered Benzies territory. Should the player refuse to truce with the Benzies, or break the truce by failing to meet the weekly quota, the Benzies will begin frequently attacking them and their dealers. To progress, the player must reduce their influence in multiple regions of the city by unlocking new customers, spraying graffiti, and defeating ambushes that occur spontaneously throughout the game. Once the player has unlocked all regions of the city, the final mission is unlocked, in which a bomb can be created and planted below the residence of the Benzies to wipe them out.

== Release and reception ==
Following its early access launch on 24 March 2025, Schedule I quickly rose to the top of Steam's sales charts, with a player count surpassing major titles like Grand Theft Auto V and Monster Hunter Wilds.

The game received positive reviews from critics, who praised its minigame crafting system. Travis Northup at IGN described that the game "mashes its dark subject matter and dirty jokes with surprisingly cozy management mechanics in a way that works really well".

On 12 May, Schedule I became unavailable on Steam in Australia. Initially, it was believed the game had been banned due to its content, with Australian players seeing a notice saying "This item is currently unavailable in your region". The developer later stated that the game was not banned, but temporarily unavailable due to content classification issues, and that they are working on resolving the issues as soon as possible.

The game was nominated for Best Early Access Game and won the Breakthrough Award at the Golden Joystick Awards 2025.

== Controversy ==
Schedule I has faced scrutiny due to alleged similarities with Drug Dealer Simulator, published by Movie Games SA. The publisher has initiated an investigation into potential intellectual property infringement, citing parallels in gameplay loops and UI design. However, no formal legal action has been taken. Tyler, the developer behind Schedule I, confirmed contact from Movie Games but noted no further communication. The situation has sparked backlash among players, leading to review bombing for Drug Dealer Simulator and its sequel, Drug Dealer Simulator 2.

Analysts, including Vice's Shaun Cichacki, acknowledge similarities but argue that such mechanics are common in the genre.
