= Gekibo: Gekisha Boy =

1992 video game

- Japanese PC Engine box art
- Developer: Tomcat System
- Publishers: Irem (PCE); D3 Publisher (PS)
- Platforms: PC Engine, PlayStation
- Release: PC Engine: JP: October 2, 1992; PlayStation: JP: May 23, 2002
- Genre: Action
- Mode: Single-player

Gekisha Boy (激写ボーイ, Gekisha Bōi) (Note: Gekisha (激写) literally translates to "exciting photography; abbreviated to Gekibo (Japanese: 激ボ).) is an action photography video game developed by Tomcat System and published by Irem for the PC Engine. The game is centered on taking photographs of the interactive environments through which the player progresses.

== Story ==
David Goldman is an amateur photographer studying at Los Angeles Photography School so he can achieve his dream of becoming a great photographer. David's parents suddenly die in a plane crash, leaving him orphaned and alone. David loses his confidence and is about to leave the academy to live a lonely and sad life. The principal of the academy sees him and says that if David completes eight tests by taking eight special photograph shots in eight different locations, then he can graduate from the academy. Unsure about this offer, David accepts the test.

== Gameplay ==
Players must guide David through the given level attempting to photograph rare or exceptional occurrences which transpire around him while evading obstacles that may injure him. As he take a successful shot of an unexpected situation, he is rewarded with extra film, increased speed and bigger camera lenses. The player can only advance to the next stage if the required score is met.

== Re-release and sequel ==
In 2002, the Japanese version of Gekibo was re-released on the PlayStation as Volume 94 of the Simple 1500 Series under the title The Cameraman: Gekisha Boy Omakefu. This version features an added stage and an unlockable cooperative gameplay with a second player as the Gekisha Girl.

A sequel for the PlayStation 2, Gekisha Boy 2, was released in Japan in 2001. A European release (re-titled Polaroid Pete) was announced in the same year, but there were no further announcements and the publisher suddenly disappeared. A competition was held in the UK "Official Playstation Magazine", but it is unknown if they announced any winners after the cancellation.
