= Uncharted Waters =

Video game series

Uncharted Waters, originally released as Daikoukai Jidai (大航海時代, Daikōkai Jidai; "Great Age of Sailing"), is a Japanese business simulation/strategy/role-playing video game series produced by Koei under its "Rekoeition" brand, themed around seafaring adventures during the Age of Discovery. In the games, the player takes up the role of a captain (or commodore in some translations) and manages a seagoing fleet to participate in trades, privateering, treasure hunting, exploration and plain piracy. Even though the series is largely open-ended, there is still a loose plot which requires the player to follow certain paths, and deviating from these paths may stall the progress of the story.

In East Asia, the series has a large cult following, but it has not received much recognition outside the region. It has been compared to the earlier Sid Meier's Pirates! in gameplay and theme.

== Historical background ==
In Japan, the term "daikoukai jidai" refers to the Age of Discovery, the period between the 15th century and the 17th century when European explorers sailed the seas to open new alternative ways to Asia when the Ottoman Empire blocked the land routes.

This period was characterized by the rivalry between Spain and Portugal, the advent of colonization, and general exploration. In later games, other countries are also involved. Some historical events during the Age of Discovery, like the Treaty of Tordesillas, were mentioned.

The games draw on historical events from the Age of Discovery, but, like Pirates!, they present a more idealized version of the period.

== Titles ==
=== Uncharted Waters ===
In the first game of the series, the player assumes the role of Leon Franco, the young, ambitious son of a noble family fallen on hard times in Portugal. The goal of the game is to restore the family's former glory and achieve Leon's dreams. Only three nations are represented in the game: Portugal, Spain and the Ottoman Empire. However, there are many neutral ports around the world that the player can "invest" in and thus make part of Portugal's sphere of influence. This, as well as discovering ports and defeating other merchants and pirates in sea battles, increases Leon's fame. With increased fame, Leon can complete tasks for the King of Portugal and gain higher titles of nobility.

The story is set in the early 16th century. It was released on the PC-88 in May 1990. It was also released on MSX and Nintendo Entertainment System in 1991, and Mega Drive/Genesis and Super NES in 1992; the Super NES version was originally titled Super Daikoukai Jidai in Japan, as with many Super NES ports of Koei games. The English versions were also released in respective years. The game was ported to PC and Macintosh as well.

=== Uncharted Waters: New Horizons ===
Uncharted Waters: New Horizons Daikoukai Jidai II
- North American SNES box art
- Developer: Koei
- Publisher: Koei
- Series: Rekoeition, Uncharted Waters
- Platforms: FM Towns, X68000, NEC PC-98, Super NES, Genesis, PC, Sega Saturn, PlayStation
- Release: FM Towns; April 1, 1993; X68000; April 30, 1993; PC-98, Super NES, Genesis; 1994; PlayStation; 1996; Sega Saturn; March 28, 1997
- Genre: Role-playing
- Mode: Single-player

Also set in the 16th century, this game is a sequel to the first title and was released for the FM Towns and the X68000 in 1993, and was later released for the NEC PC-98, Super NES, Mega Drive/Genesis, and PC in 1994. It also saw releases in 1996 on PlayStation, and then a year later for the Sega Saturn which was released exclusively in Japan. The Super NES version was released on Wii's Virtual Console service in Japan on March 17, 2009, and in North America on April 6. It was later released for the Wii U's Virtual Console in 2013, for Japan on October 30, in North America on November 14, and for the first time in Europe on November 28.

In this game, there are six protagonists to choose from, each of them representing a different path or career featured in the game:

- João Franco: Son of Leon from the first game, a Portuguese explorer sent by his father to follow the family's footsteps and discover the secrets of the lost continent of Atlantis.
- Catalina Erantzo: Former Spanish naval officer turned pirate, she avenges the loss of her brother and her fiancée and suspects that the Franco family is behind this scheme. She is loosely based upon the historical character of Catalina de Erauso, the Lieutenant Nun.
- Otto Baynes: English naval officer, a privateer sent by Henry VIII in a secret mission to defeat the Spanish Armada and prevent Spanish hegemony in the European continent.
- Ernst von Bohr: Dutch teacher and cartographer, he is set to make a journey to far lands and with this experience create a map of the entire world.
- Pietro Conti: Italian treasure hunter, he inherited a huge debt from his father and is set to travel for treasures and other secrets in order to cover the debt.
- Ali Vezas: Turkish merchant, he grew up as an orphan in extreme poverty. With the help of his friend, he decides to become a trade merchant and find his lost sister.

While the game is more or less open-ended, developing the character's career is necessary to advance the plot.

At the time of release, the Super NES version of the game is noted to contain superior music to the other ports of the game, as the game took advantage of the Nintendo S-SMP chip and used high-quality instrument samples. On the other hand, the other console ports of the game at that time were released on consoles that used an OPL2 family chipset for music. While the PC could support high-quality samples via the Sound Blaster AWE32 or Gravis Ultrasound family of cards, the PC port game did not take advantage of those advanced solutions, instead choosing to only be optimized for AdLib music cards, which used an OPL2 chip for music.

The Saturn and PlayStation version contained enhanced FMV opening cutscenes.

Reviewing the Genesis version, GamePro deemed the game an acquired taste due to the bare bones presentation and frequent money-managing.

==== Mobile Daikoukai Jidai 2 ====
Mobile 大航海時代2
- Publishers: Koei (KOEI Co., Ltd.)
- Series: Uncharted Waters
- Platforms: i-mode, Yahoo Mobile, EZweb
- Release: JP: 2007-06-04 (i-Mode); JP: 2007-07-18 (Yahoo Mobile); JP: 2007-10-25 (EZweb)

It is a mobile phone version of Daikoukai Jidai II series.

Changes include:

- Limiting character selection in a campaign game to 2 within the first month of subscription.
- Port interface is streamlined to eliminate moving player character within port.

=== Daikoukai Jidai III: Costa del Sol ===
Released in 1996 on PC, this title was the first to depart from the formula and engine of the series. The traditional focus on story was removed in this game, and some character customization is possible, if only purely decorative. There are two player characters from Portugal and Spain. The role-playing element was greatly reduced, and differences between them are mainly mechanical.

The theme of exploration is heavily emphasized, as land travel is now possible, and there is a lot more to be explored and discovered overall, compared to the early titles. The game starts in the mid-15th century and allows for the player to make historical discoveries such as the New World or a route to India as well as conquer civilizations like the Aztec and Inca Empires. Also, the game experiments with the concept of language in a video game, a feature uncommon in the industry, and necessitating the hiring of translators and teachers. The player can also continue the game by marrying bar-girls and having children, who in turn can continue the seafaring tradition and even take on part of his father's skills and inventory. Perhaps it is due to these dramatic changes that Daikoukai Jidai 3 left players uncomfortable and failed to achieve much popularity even within Japan.

At its initial release, this title caused some controversy for allowing slave trade in the game. The feature is disabled in later updates.

Unlike most games in the series, this game was never released for consoles; it was only released for PC, working under Windows 2000.

=== Daikoukai Jidai Gaiden ===
Released in 1997 on PlayStation and Sega Saturn, the game uses the same engine as the II. Focusing on the story of two characters instead, the game further expounding upon the loose plot that ties the series together. The two protagonists are as follows:

- Miranda Verte: Genoese adventurer who mistakenly thought the treasure hunter, Pietro Conti, had asked for her hand in marriage, and sets off to find him. Her quest eventually leads to a plot relating to an ancient civilization in South America, which were touched on by Pietro's previous adventure.
- Salvador Reis: Pirate and adopted son of Hayreddin Reis (a.k.a. Khayr ad-Din). His adventure involves rising to fame as one of the Algerian pirates, compete for domination with enemy pirate clans and also struggle for power within his own clan.

=== Daikoukai Jidai IV: Porto Estado ===
Daikoukai Jidai IV Porto Estado
- Publishers: (Japan) Koei (KOEI Co., Ltd.); Sourcenext Corporation
- Series: Uncharted Waters
- Platforms: PlayStation, Windows 95, Windows 2000
- Release: JP: 1999-02-26 (PS); JP: 1999-12-02 (Win, Koei release); JP: 2001-12-06 (PS rerelease); JP: 2003-10-03 (Win, Koei rerelease); JP: 2005-07-08 (Win, Sourcenext release)

The fourth game in the series was released for both PlayStation and PC under Windows 2000 and XP. This game returns to the previous formula, although its open-endedness has decreased and the engine has been updated. This title is plot-wise unrelated to the series that ended in Gaiden. Porto Estado is known for its fine art and high-quality illustrations.

The story evolves on the search of the seven Proof of the Conqueror, which are seven ancient artifacts, in seven areas around the world (Northern Europe, Mediterranean, Africa, New World, Indian Ocean, South Asia and East Asia). It is said that having these proofs proves that the sailor is the champion of all sailors. Four sailors (plus another three in expansion) unwittingly involved in the struggle of the quest of the search of the Proof of the Conqueror. Not all sailors are from Europe: two of the seven characters are from Asia (one from East Asia and another from southeast Asia), one from the Caribbean and another one from the Middle East.

There are many significant changes in this game. For example, the game no longer has the concept of years; as a result, characters in this game will not age. The player can also set up regional fleets, which are valuable financial resources. In combat, naval battle is now fought in real time.

The country boundaries have disappeared. Each character is only represented by their own guild; their home country is not important in gameplay. Ports in this game also have a market share rating in a percentage scale. Players can trade in a port only when his guild has some market share in that port, which can be gained by signing a contract with the local governor.

Native Windows 2000 and XP support are introduced in Koei rerelease and Sourcenext release for the Windows game.

==== Daikoukai Jidai IV Porto Estado Powerup Kit ====
大航海時代IV PORTO ESTADO パワーアップキット (Koei title) 大航海時代IV ～PORTO ESTADO～ with パワーアップキット (Sourcenext title)
- Publishers: (Japan) Koei (KOEI Co., Ltd.); Sourcenext Corporation
- Series: Uncharted Waters
- Platforms: Windows 95, Windows 2000, Nintendo Switch
- Release: JP: 2000-03-31 (Win, Koei release); JP: 2001-12-06 (Win, Sourcenext release, includes base game); JP: 2021-05-20 (Nintendo Switch)

This version adds the following:

- 3 new player characters and the associated scenario games. In those scenarios, players start at earlier time. Game item locations and marine influences are also changed.
- Accepting quests from guilds.
- Every January, first-class goods sold within markets controlled by player's shares can be branded. Player can earn shares for the surplus in branded goods for sales of the goods.
- Introduction of mini-games in player selection.
- Viewing bonus graphics when loading games.
- Ability to view character profiles.
- In Sourcenext version, native Windows 2000/XP support.

==== Daikoukai Jidai IV Rota Nova ====
Daikoukai Jidai IV Rota Nova
- Publishers: (Japan) Koei (KOEI Co., Ltd.)
- Series: Uncharted Waters
- Platforms: PlayStation Portable, Nintendo DS, PlayStation Vita
- Release: JP: 2006-03-02 (DS); JP: 2006-03-23 (PSP); JP: 2006-09-28 (DS rerelease); JP: 2007-04-05 (PSP rerelease); JP: 2009-03-23 (PSP download, PSV download); JP: 2012-09-06 (PSP UMD rerelease)

Rota Nova was released by KOEI on March 23, 2006, for the PlayStation Portable and Nintendo DS. This is a remake of Porto Estado for handhelds:

- The PSP version includes a ship race function.
- The DS version includes use of the stylus and map.

==== Mobile Daikoukai Jidai 4 ====
Mobile 大航海時代4
- Publisher: Koei Tecmo Games
- Series: Uncharted Waters
- Platforms: i-mode, Yahoo Mobile, EZweb
- Release: JP: 2010-11-01 (i-Mode); JP: 2010-12-15 (Yahoo Mobile); JP: 2011-02-17 (EZweb)

It is a mobile phone version of Daikoukai Jidai IV series.

=== Uncharted Waters Online ===
Uncharted Waters Online
- Platforms: Windows, PlayStation 3
- Release: Japan (Spring 2005); Korea (July 2005); Taiwan (January 2006); China (January 7, 2007); USA (Fall 2010) (Windows); SEA (November 19, 2011)

Uncharted Waters Online offers much of the same gameplay experience seen in the single player games in a multiplayer environment. Players of the single player series will be well aware of similar concepts such as Missions, Adjutants, Investment, and National & Pirate NPC fleets.

Country boundaries have reappeared, with more countries (Spain, Portugal, Venice, Ottoman Empire, France, England, and the Netherlands), but the concept of time is non-existent. The storyline is important to unlocking new areas in the game. The player now receives fame from activities such as battling, trading, discovering, and sailing. When fame levels reach required amounts, the player unlocks new areas of the world. The level of fame required differ from country to country.

The game introduces a 3D-environment with DirectX 9.0c capabilities. As an MMORPG, the game features fleet operations (party-system), companies (guilds), player versus player combat, trade, adventure, and poker, and large-scale factional warfare, along with a single player storyline and player-versus-environment quests.

=== Daikoukai Jidai V: Road to Zipang ===
(Japan) 大航海時代V Road To Zipang (South Korea) 대항해시대V (Hong Kong) (Taiwan) 大航海時代V (China) 大航海时代5
- Publishers: Windows versions: (Japan) Gamecity (Koei Tecmo Games), DeNA Mobage, Niconico Appli (DWANGO Co., Ltd.), Hangame (NHN hangame Corp.) (South Korea) GandromedA (gandromeda inc.); BLUE PANDA Network Technology Co., Ltd (Hong Kong) (Taiwan) Cayenne Tech (Cayenne Entertainment Technology Co., Ltd.); Mobile versions: (Japan) Koei Tecmo Games (Android, iOS) (Japan) mobage by DeNA (DeNA Co., Ltd.) (Android, iOS); VGAME (China Mobile Games and Entertainment Group Limited) (Android, iOS) (Hong Kong) Cayenne Tech (Cayenne Entertainment Technology Co., Ltd.) (South Korea) GandromedA (gandromeda inc.)
- Series: Uncharted Waters
- Platforms: Windows Vista, iOS 6.0, Android 2.3
- Release: Windows versions: JP: 2014-03-18 (download version); JP: 2014-03-26 (initial final release); (Taiwan) 2014-11-13-2014-11-19 (VIP test) (South Korea) 2015-01-15 (Hong Kong) 2015-01-21 (Taiwan) 2015-01-21 (closed test) (Taiwan) 2015-02-05 (open test) (Taiwan) 2015-02-05 (final version) (China) 2015-04-28-2015-05-10 (first beta) (China) 2015-06-16 (second beta); Mobile versions: (Japan) 2014-07-01 (Android) (Japan) 2014-08-04 (iOS) (China) 2015-01-13-2015-01-20 (final closed test) (China) 2015-02-05 (first open test) (Hong Kong) 2015-04-16 (South Korea) 2016-04-14

It is a free-to-play web browser game and a sequel to Daikoukai Jidai IV series. It is also available on Google Play and App Store (iOS).

==== Daikoukai Jidai V Special Pack ====
大航海時代V スペシャルパック
- Publishers: Windows versions: (Japan) Sourcenext Corporation
- Series: Uncharted Waters
- Platform: Windows Vista
- Release: JP: 2015-04-25 (box version)

This version includes Sonia de la Cruz SR card (adds skill female intuition Lv.1), Rank X merchant vessel Black Herring, Scout Ticket Gold++, 1 million gold coins at start of game, 5000NP scouting points (adds 50 free scoutings).

=== Daikoukai Jidai VI ===
Released on September 26, 2019, and only available on Google Play and App Store (iOS), it is the sixth numbered title of the series.

=== Uncharted Waters Origin ===
A reboot of the series was released on March 7, 2023.

== Soundtracks ==
The soundtracks for both Uncharted Waters and New Horizons were composed by Yoko Kanno. The soundtrack for Uncharted Waters Online is based in part on those works.

== Reception ==
Dave Arneson in Computer Gaming World in 1992 criticized the first Uncharted Waters' inaccurate history and geography, flawed and repetitive game play ("those who are looking for variety and surprises should weigh anchor and sail for another game"), and "one-dimensional" NPCs unlike those in other Koei games. In a 1993 survey of pre 20th-century strategy games the magazine gave the game two stars out of five, stating that while its geography was inaccurate and user interface "could bear improvement", "game play can be interesting".
