= Street Cleaning Simulator =

2011 video game

- Developer: TML Studios
- Publishers: Astragon; Excalibur Publishing
- Platform: Microsoft Windows
- Release: EU: Jul 1, 2011
- Genre: Simulator
- Mode: Single-player

Street Cleaning Simulator (originally titled in German Kehrmaschinen-Simulator 2011) is a simulation game developed by TML Studios for Windows and released in 2011 by publishers Astragon and Excalibur Publishing. The game received attention for being rated 1.5 out of 10 and called "abysmal" by the gaming site GameSpot, yet earning a user community score of 9.1.

== Reception ==
Reception

Aggregate score
Aggregator	Score
GameRankings	27%

Review scores
Publication	Score
GameSpot	1.5/10
PC Gamer (UK)	3.9/10

Street Cleaning Simulator received negative reviews from critics. Though GameSpot praised Street Cleaning Simulator's "nicely detailed sweeper vehicles" they also noted "Street Cleaning Simulator could only be considered a simulator in a world where the rules of gravity don't apply" and gave it a score of 1.5 out of 10.
