= Government simulation game =

Game that attempts to simulate the politics of a nation

A government simulation or political simulation is a game that attempts to simulate the government and politics of all or part of a nation. These games may include geopolitical situations (involving the formation and execution of foreign policy), the creation of domestic political policies, or the simulation of political campaigns. They differ from the genre of classical wargames due to their discouragement or abstraction of military or action elements.

== Background ==
Games based on geopolitics and elections existed long before the emergence of personal computers and their ability to quickly process large amounts of statistical data. One of the earliest such games was The Game of Politics, created by Oswald Lord in 1935 which remained in print until 1960. In 1954, the board game Diplomacy was created, which differs from other wargames in that it features a "negotiation" phase during which players reach agreements with other players, and then execute military moves simultaneously. National politics has remained a vital area of board gaming, with products such as the 1986 board game Die Macher featuring elections in Germany, and Wreck the Nation which satirizes the politics of the United States under the George W. Bush administration.

After enjoying years as a play-by-mail game, Diplomacy was one of the first games to move to take advantage of email, and continued to be a popular email game into the 2000s.

== Computer gaming ==
A screenshot from the 1985 Atari ST version of Balance of Power

As computers became more sophisticated, games in this genre moved beyond email to more complex simulations. For most users in Europe, the first well known politics game was Dictator, released in 1983 by DK'Tronics and running on Sinclair's ZX Spectrum. One of the earliest titles in this genre was Balance of Power, designed by Chris Crawford and published in 1985. This game features conflict at the height of the Cold War, using political and policy decisions to shape outcomes rather than warfare. In Balance of Power, any armed conflict between the player and the opponent superpower results in a nuclear war, which is considered a loss condition.

Other Cold War era games included Conflict: Middle East Political Simulator created by Virgin Interactive, Spectrum Holobyte's Crisis in the Kremlin and Hidden Agenda.

Conflict simulated a hypothetical situation in 1997 in which the player assumes the role of the Israeli Prime Minister and is obligated to employ various diplomatic and covert directives to defeat its rival nations. Surrounded by hostile nations, the player is restrained by a very limited military force and thereby encouraged to employ peaceful means to remain in power until he acquired more advanced weapons systems and power.

In Crisis in the Kremlin, the user could play as the protege of any of the following Soviet politicians: Mikhail Gorbachev of the reformist faction; Yegor Ligachev, leader of the hard-line faction; and Boris Yeltsin, who was the prevalent figure of the nationalist faction. The player could use the simulation to test certain strategies to lead the failing Soviet Union into a new era of prosperity or force its dissolution and integration into the new world order. This game introduced the concept of budget management, citizen and faction satisfaction as well as multiple economic values and political spectrum.

In Hidden Agenda the user takes the role of the president of Chimerica, a post-revolutionary Central American country, trying to juggle international relations and the needs of the country's citizens.

Early political simulation games were intended more for education than entertainment. In 1987, On the Campaign Trail was developed as a tool at Kent State University's political campaign management program, and engaged students in decision-making regarding the campaigns for United States Senate elections between 1970 and 1986. Subsequently, a commercial market developed for packaged games involving elections and campaigns.

A screenshot from Stardock's 2004 game Political Machine

The 1992 game Power Politics (and, before it, 1981's President Elect) focused on domestic United States political campaigns (but not the running of the country upon election). In 1996, this was adapted to the Doonesbury Election Game, designed by Randy Chase (who also did Power Politics) and published by Mindscape, in which players conducted a campaign with the assistance of a pool of advisors selected from characters in the Doonesbury comic strip. A successor entitled Power Politics III was released in 2005. In 2004, Stardock published Political Machine, in which the player steers a candidate through a 41-week election cycle for United States President, developing policies and tailoring talk show appearances and speech content. The game is heavily tied to modern polling methods, using real-time feedback for how campaign strategy impacts polling numbers. In 2006, TheorySpark released President Forever 2008 + Primaries, an election simulation game that allows the player to realistically control an entire election campaign through both the Primaries and General Election. President Forever 2008 + Primaries itself a follow-up to the highly successful general election sim President Forever, released in 2004.

Some games in the genre involve enacting policies and budget decisions to sway voters. One such game is Democracy, published in 2005 by Positech Games. In Democracy, players make decisions during each turn regarding which policies to support. As turns progress, the player views how their favourability rating changes amongst certain types of voters. Candidates make promises before each election, and failure to follow through can result in lower support during the player's re-election campaign. Other examples are the Geo-Political-Simulator series, produced by Eversim, boasting an array of choices for domestic policy and decisions based around current geopolitical issues, and Tropico series. The Political Process, an independent development in early access, allows players to create a custom politician and control their career. Players can work in different positions, run for political office, write legislation, and appoint government officers.

There can also be found games that puts the player in the seat of a state leader, such as SuperPower, and its sequel, SuperPower 2 and SuperPower 3, whose goals are to produce economic stability and prosperity, but the game mainly revolves around foreign policies, with the abilities to interact with other countries in many ways. The game includes a great number of real-life treaties that influence countries.

Other video game series such as Crusader Kings aim to show the political situations of medieval governments. These are more centered on dynastic politics and court intrigue than simulation games set in modern eras. Total War: Medieval also aimed to simulate this side of dynastic politics. Both of these simulate individual personality traits and different skills of characters who exist within governments and their surrounding courtiers.

== Online games ==
Web-based games such as NationStates allow players to manage the day-to-day decisions of individual governments, and compete against rival nations. Other, similar games like Politics and War include trade and war mechanics. Less formally structured games are also played out in internet forums, where players manage governments and nations according to a set of agreed rules. These such forum-based simulation games – often known as polsims – simulate the politics of one specific nation throughout rounds set in differing time periods. Not all polsims take place on a national level. Some polsims take place internationally, whereas others take place on the state or local levels. Players on such games play as fictional politicians and participate in debates, media activity, and simulated elections. An example of a polsim like this would be AustraliaSim, MHoC and CMHoC.

In other web based games players register, apply for an open position (either a country or person inside a country such as a politician or army general) and carry out game activities either through newspapers or other activities or (more commonly) through gamemasters.

== Related games ==
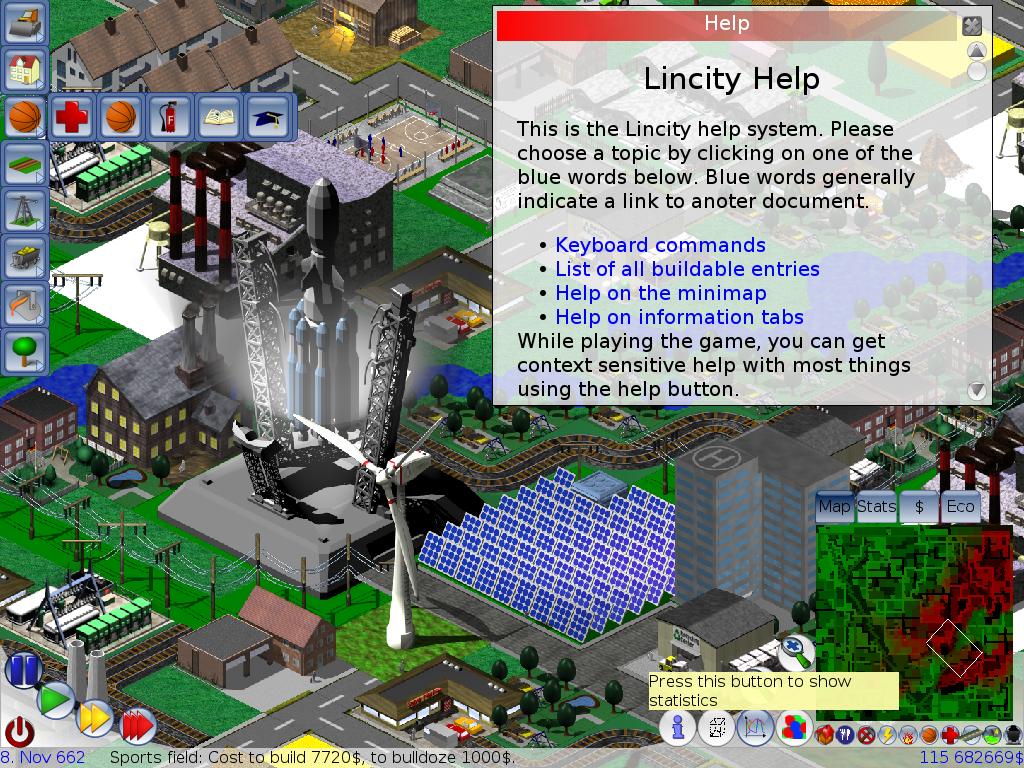
City-building games, such as Lincity, require the player to manage the governing features of a city.

Other construction and management simulations require government management. For example, city-building games such as the SimCity series of games developed and published by Maxis simulates the experience of being a mayor. SimCity features a real-time environment in which the player can create zones for city development, build roads, power and water utilities, and watch as their city develops based on their decisions. The game was originally published in 1989 and as of 2013 was in its fifth major release.

Strategy games frequently make use of government management challenges. 4X games require the management of a government, be it tribal or interstellar. This includes tasks such as building infrastructure and conducting trade. Galactic Civilizations II requires players to manage their approval rating to keep their political party in power. Domestic policy is sometimes abstracted with more emphasis on international conflict. For example, the Civilization series gives players control over resources, and the building of an empire.

Other strategy games focus on government management to varying degrees. For instance, in the Hearts of Iron games (set in World War II) the civilian population is only a factor with partisans and manpower, whereas in Victoria a player must not only conquer, but implement the Second Industrial Revolution while warding off (or ushering in) political revolutions such as the upheavals of 1848 and communist revolt.

Government and politics have also been incorporated into adventure games. A Mind Forever Voyaging, published by Infocom in 1985, was an interactive fiction game in which the player controlled a sentient computer capable of experimenting with potential future scenarios based on varying public policy decisions. Newsweek said of the game, "It isn't '1984,' but in some ways it is even scarier."

The 2008 game Spore features a "Civilization" stage where the player controls vehicles and interacts with other cities until they have control of all 12 cities.

== Training and education ==
Beyond entertainment, these games have practical applications in training and education of government personnel. Training simulations have been created for subjects such as managing law enforcement policies (such as racial profiling), the simulation of a military officer's career, and hospital responses to emergency situations.

== Examples ==
- Balance of Power (1985)
- Bandit Kings of Ancient China (1989)
- Conflict: Middle East Political Simulator (1990)
- Crisis in the Kremlin (1991)
- Crusader Kings series (2004-2020)
- CyberJudas (1996)
- Diplomacy (1954)
- Democracy series (2005-2020)
- eRepublik (2008)
- Floor 13 (1991)
- Geo-Political Simulator series (2008-2022)
- Hidden Agenda (1988)
- NationStates (2002)
- Not For Broadcast (2022)
- Political Animals (2016)
- The Political Machine series (2004-2024)
- Power Politics (1992)
- President Elect (1981)
- President Forever 2008 + Primaries (2006)
- Rebel Inc. (2018)
- Republic: The Revolution (2003)
- Republic of Rome (1990)
- Shadow President (1993)
- SuperPower series (2002-2022)
- Supreme Ruler series (1982–2017)
- Suzerain (2020)
- Tropico series (2001–2019)
- Twilight Struggle (2005)
- Victoria series (2003-2022)
