= Political Animals (video game) =

2016 video game

- Steam cover art
- Developer: Squeaky Wheel
- Publisher: Positech Games
- Platforms: Windows, MacOS, Linux
- Release: 2016
- Genre: Political simulation

Political Animals is a 2016 government simulation game developed by Philippine-based studio Squeaky Wheel and released by British independent publisher Positech Games, the latter which also made the Democracy video game series. The game focuses on implementing policies and dealing with scandals, in order to secure votes and win an election, which is the main goal.
