= Crisis in the Kremlin =

1991 video game

- Developers: Barbu Corporation; Spectrum HoloByte
- Publishers: NA: Spectrum HoloByte; EU: MicroProse
- Designer: Larry Barbu
- Artist: Daniel L. Guerra
- Composer: Paul Mogg
- Platform: MS-DOS
- Release: NA: 1991; EU: 1991
- Genre: Strategy
- Mode: Single-player

Crisis in the Kremlin is a 1991 strategy video game with managerial aspects in which the player acts as General Secretary of the Communist Party of the Soviet Union from 1985 to 2017. The player assumes the role of the reformist Mikhail Gorbachev, the nationalist Boris Yeltsin, or the hardliner Yegor Ligachyov. Actual jokes recorded by the KGB can be found in the gameplay, depicting the concerns of the Soviet people in a humorous light. The game was developed and released at a time when the Soviet Union was collapsing and breaking apart with the game's events making reference to that. Indeed, the Soviet Union dissolved in the same year as the game's release. A remake and spiritual successor of the game was published in 2017 on the game platform Steam.

== Gameplay ==
A scene set in January 2013 with the Russian people in turmoil. A food shortage is about to turn into a crisis.

Starting in 1985, the player handles various governing tasks, from policies such as civil rights and the workweek to budgets. It was the first game to include the individual allocation of funding in a budget. A significant portion of the game involves special events, such as the 1988 Armenian earthquake or the Chernobyl disaster. The player's responses to these events can involve taking the historical route or a dramatically different approach; the player is given usually three to five choices after picking up the appropriate telephone. The player must walk a line between radicals, reformists, and hardliners. Overly scorning any side can cause the player to fall out of favor with it, which may lead to a vote of no confidence in the Politburo. Warsaw Pact states will also begin to shy away from the Soviet Union, as will the Baltic states, the Ukraine, and other Union Republics.

The player may cut or increase spending to various parts of the nation, such as construction, environment, the military, pensions, Soviet Republics, and so on. The player can spend toward different groups, such as bureaucrats or conservatives, to gain their support. A food shortage can occur, for example, if not enough money is being spent on agriculture and transport (roads, buses, railroads, trucks, highways, etc.).

Extra events occur if the player lasts past the Soviet Union's (and the game's own) time frame, such as American intervention in North Korea or the ability to renegotiate a new Union treaty to form a confederation or disband the Soviet Union altogether in favor of a British-style commonwealth. New technology will also develop, as will fears of an asteroid hitting the earth. The new technology can include things like vaccines for AIDS (developed by Soviet scientists that will improve diplomatic relationships with other nations) and animal cloning solutions that will prevent world hunger - using in vitro meat.

== Reception ==
Chuck Moss wrote in Computer Gaming World in 1992 that Crisis in the Kremlin was biased in a way that "drives the player toward establishing a free market, and both political and social liberation". The reviewer stated that as "an unreconstructed Reaganite" he agreed with the biases but noted that Cuba and China were examples of countries that did not perform USSR-like reforms and survived, writing that "This distorts the game's veracity from the outset". Moss criticized the detailed control the player has over the economy ("which was the USSR's problem in the first place!") without any way to reduce the control, and the lack of political conflicts with subordinates as in Hidden Agenda. Another example of the game's unrealism, the reviewer reported, was that he was repeatedly unable to have the USSR survive beyond 1988 when emulating Gorbachev. Moss nonetheless found the game very enjoyable ("I've played it for two months and I'm not sick of it") and approved of the graphics. He concluded that "This worthy stab at a limited genre is to be commended". In a 1994 survey of wargames the magazine gave the title two stars out of five, describing it as a "superb rendition of the problems facing" the USSR before dissolution, but "somewhat tedious" for non-accountants.

PCGames named Crisis in the Kremlin the best strategy game of 1992. The editors called it "at once a thing of complexity and a thing of beauty".

== Remake ==
The developer Kremlingames released a remake and spiritual successor to the 1991 version under the same name. The game was released in 2017, which is the final playable year in the 1991 version and marks 100 years since the October Revolution. Unlike the original, the goal is not just to preserve the USSR and the Warsaw Pact but to expand the communist bloc to other countries. Unlike the 1991 version, it is possible to win the Cold War by weakening the United States until it is no longer is a superpower. The game introduced additional factions, which included Stalinist, conservative, moderate, reformist, and liberal. It also introduced multiple endings, such as perestroika, nuclear war, world communism, and parades of sovereignty. The economic, domestic, and diplomatic systems were also made more complex. Kremlingames later developed Ostalgie: The Berlin Wall and China: Mao's Legacy, in which players control Eastern European communist states and communist China, respectively.

The prominent Russian gaming magazine Game World Navigator gave the game a rating of 6.2/10. Another prominent Russian gaming magazine, Igromania, rated the game 8/10.

A sequel to the remake of Crisis in the Kremlin, entitled Crisis in the Kremlin: The Cold War, was released in 2025.

== See also ==
- Hidden Agenda
- Shadow President - a video game about being an American president instead of the Soviet General Secretary
