= Commander in Chief (video game) =

2008 video game

- PAL boxart, featuring a stylized derivative of the Barack Obama "Hope" poster
- Developer(s): Eversim
- Publisher(s): Interactive Gaming Software (IGS)
- Platform(s): PC
- Release: July 25, 2008
- Genre(s): Government simulation game Real-time Strategy
- Mode(s): Single-player, Multiplayer

Commander in Chief, also known as Geo-Political Simulator, is a government simulation game that allows a player to simulate being a nation's head of government. Players have a large amount of control over their nation, although this varies based on the form of government the player's nation has. The English version was released on July 25, 2008, and has also been released in French, German, Spanish and Russian. The French version has been named Mission-Président.

== Gameplay ==
When starting a new game, players may choose between various scenarios, some of which have set objectives while others are more akin to a "sandbox" mode.

Similarly to other government simulation games like Democracy, the player assumes the role of the chief executive of their chosen nation such as the President of the United States of America or the Prime Minister of the United Kingdom. Unlike in the Democracy series the player may amend the constitution of their chosen state and run it as a dictatorship.

== Inaccuracies ==
The game refers to the position of chief executive as "Head of State" which is not true for all states—for example, the President of the United States is the Head of State, but the British Prime Minister or German Chancellor are not—and in the game, the player plays as the chief executive. In many states there is a distinction between the Head of Government and the Head of State, with the Head of State often being a ceremonial president or monarch. There is also no distinction in the game between any upper and lower houses of the parliament.

There are also inaccuracies relating to nations in the game, as many nations are misrepresented. For example, the Finnish are inaccurately portrayed as being culturally Scandinavian, all Finnish have Swedish names when Swedish speakers only constitute 5.5% of the population. Other inaccuracies relate to the religion. Certain minority religions, such as the Baha'i faith in Iran, are not represented in the game, nor are pagans of any kind. There are also mistakes relating to ethnicity. For example, all the people of Kyrgyzstan, as opposed to a sizable minority, are represented as being Caucasian rather than east Asian and also all have Russian names also Macedonians having Turkish name inaccuracies in the game. Similarly, most Filipinos have Indian names.

== Reception ==
Reception

Review scores
Publication	Score
GameZone	5.0/10
IGN	4.5/10

The game received mixed to negative reviews. Jason Ocampo of IGN remarked that the game was "difficult to take as a serious simulation of global politics." A reviewer for GameZone stated that the game was "a pretty hollow attempt to cash in on the recent Presidential elections."

== Sequels ==
- Rulers of Nations
- Masters of the World
- Geo-Political Simulator 4: Power and Revolution
