= Master of the World =

Master of the World can refer to:

- Master of the World (novel), a 1904 novel by Jules Verne
  - Master of the World (1961 film), a film loosely connected to the novel
- Master of the World (1934 film), a German science fiction film
- Master of the World (character), a Marvel Comics character

== See also ==
- Masters of the World, a 2013 government simulation game by Eversim
