= Rulers of Nations =

2010 video game

- Developer: Eversim
- Platform: PC
- Release: October 1st, 2010
- Genres: Government simulation game Real-time strategy
- Modes: Single-player, Multiplayer

Rulers of Nations, also known as Geo-Political-Simulator 2, is the second installment of the Geo-Political series. This government simulation game, like its predecessor, puts the player in the role of any nation's head of state. French, German, Spanish, Italian, and Russian versions of the game will also be released.

== Gameplay ==
In addition to the features of its predecessor, the graphics had a significant change. Characters are represented in animated 3D as opposed to its predecessor, where characters are only represented by 2D avatars. In contrast to its previous versions, the avatars of selected world leaders are represented by their real counterparts at the time of the game's release.

== Caricatures ==
Rulers of Nations under default settings includes characters which caricature real life figures at the time of the game's release. However, there is only one standard voice for male and another for female leaders. People caricatured include:

- Roman Catholic pope Benedict XVI
- US president Barack Obama
- UK prime minister David Cameron
- German Bundeskanzlerin Angela Merkel
- French president Nicolas Sarkozy
- Chinese president Hu Jintao
- Indian prime minister Manmohan Singh
- South African president Jacob Zuma
- Venezuelan president Hugo Chávez
- Spanish prime minister José Luis Rodríguez Zapatero
- Russian president Dmitry Medvedev
- Brazilian president Luiz Inácio Lula da Silva
- Japanese prime minister Naoto Kan
- Italian prime minister Silvio Berlusconi (titled "President of State Council")
- Iranian president Mahmoud Ahmadinejad
- Canadian prime minister Stephen Harper
- Australian prime minister Julia Gillard
- Afghan president Hamid Karzai
- Thai prime minister Abhisit Vejjajiva
- Peruvian president Alan Garcia
- Nigerian president Goodluck Jonathan
- Israeli prime minister Benjamin Netanyahu
- Bangladeshi prime minister Sheikh Hasina
- Brotherly Leader and Guide of the Revolution of Libya Muammar Gaddafi (in mannerisms & speech only, not appearance, titled as "Guide")
- Kyrgyz president Roza Otunbayeva
- Mexican president Felipe Calderon
- Swiss Bundeskanzler Corina Casanova (titled "President of State Council")
- Uzbek president Islam Karimov
- Danish Statsminister Lars Løkke Rasmussen
- Secretary-General of the United Nations Ban Ki-moon
- First Lady of the United States Michelle Obama
- US Secretary of Defense Chuck Hagel
- US Secretary of State Hillary Clinton
- Indian president Pratibha Pratil
- Russian prime minister Vladimir Putin
- Leader of the Liberal Democrats Nick Clegg
- German president Christian Wulff
- First Secretary of the French Socialist Party Martine Aubry
- French National Front leader Marine Le Pen
- Prime Minister of France François Fillon

== Inaccuracies ==
Territorial disputes in Rulers of Nations are merely shown as a cause for poor bilateral relations, with one of the claimant countries having full control of the region. Examples include:

- Kosovo, which is shown as an independent state even if it is not recognized by Serbia and large number of countries in the United Nations.
- Nagorno-Karabakh is shown as wholly controlled by Azerbaijan, despite real life de facto rule by the unrecognised state of the Nagorno-Karabakh Republic.
- Northern Cyprus is shown as wholly controlled by Cyprus, despite real life de facto rule by the unrecognised state of the Turkish Republic of Northern Cyprus.
- The Senkaku Islands are portrayed as controlled by China, except for South Korea being shown to occupy the waters up to Socotra Rock.
- Gibraltar and the Falkland Islands are shown to be sovereign states, and although non-playable, are not in any way related to the in-game United Kingdom, and thus not affecting in-game Spain–United Kingdom relations or Argentina–United Kingdom relations respectively.
- The entire Spratly Islands in-game are shown to be under the full control of the Philippines, without recognising Taiwan's, China's, Vietnam's, Malaysia's or Brunei's claims at all. However, the real-life Taiwanese military presence is portrayed as a Taiwanese foreign military base in Philippine territory placed on and named after Itu-Aba.
- Western Sahara and the Sahrawi Arab Democratic Republic are completely absent from the game, instead showing Morocco filling the territorial claims of both entities.

Some cities were also incorrectly positioned such as Cebu City in the Philippines. In the game Cebu City is positioned on Bohol island and not on Cebu island, while Wellington, the capital city of New Zealand is shown in-game as on the South Island as opposed to the North Island in real life. Other inaccuracies are in the portrayal of people in-game, for example, Indians and Pakistanis are shown to be White people. And although the portrayals of several in-game leaders are based on their real life appearances, the in-game Prime Minister of Italy and the in-game Prime Minister of Japan bear little or no resemblance to present or recent leaders of either country, but this could possibly reflect the frequent leadership changes that happen in both countries.

The game features several significant inaccuracies. For example, it could be argued that the United Kingdom's military might is wholly underrepresented in the game as its overseas territories which are of strategic and military advantage such as the Falkland Islands (which contain a RAF and Royal Navy base) and Gibraltar (which contains a Royal Navy and RAF base) are dependencies of the United Kingdom, however the UK has no control over these territories and no military sites are available to the British executive. The British Royal Air Force has no sovereign base areas in Cyprus and the Royal Navy harbor in Bahrain is also absent from the game. Additionally, the Indian Ocean territory of Diego Garcia appears to be absent from the world map, a territory that houses an RAF base hosting US fighter jets. Most significantly however, the British Army has no presence or military positioning in Germany (British Forces Germany) as it does in reality with excess of 20,000 British troops.

== Reception ==
Reception

Aggregate score
Aggregator	Score
Metacritic	63/100

Review score
Publication	Score
GameWatcher	65/100

The game received mixed reviews, with a 63/100 score on the review aggregation website Metacritic, signifying "mixed or average" reviews.
