= Power politics (disambiguation) =

Power politics is a form of international relations in which countries protect their interests through threats.

Power politics may also refer to:

- Power Politics (poetry collection), a 1971 collection by Margaret Atwood
- Power Politics (video game), a 1992 simulation video game
- Power Politics (Wight book), a 1946 book by Martin Wight
- Power (social and political), the ability to influence or control the behavior of people
