= Rebel Inc. =

Rebel Inc. may refer to:

- Rebel Inc. (magazine), a Scottish literary magazine
- Rebel Inc. (video game), a 2018 video game
