= Gratuitous Space Battles =

2009 video game

- Developer: Positech Games
- Publisher: Positech Games
- Designer: Cliff Harris
- Composer: Jesse Hopkins
- Platforms: Microsoft Windows, Mac OS X, Linux
- Release: November 17, 2009
- Genre: Strategy
- Mode: Single player

Gratuitous Space Battles is a video game developed by the UK-based company Positech Games. It was released on November 17, 2009. On one level the title is a space warfare simulation consisting of a number of engagements between two opposing fleets of ships. While sometimes assumed to be a real-time strategy (RTS) game based on screenshots, actual gameplay focuses on the setup prior to the battle, making it play more like a tower defense game.

A custom made game engine was produced for the 2D game. Gratuitous Space Battles generally received favourable reviews upon release. Most reviews praised the detailed graphics with some finding the gameplay a little confusing, at least initially.

== Plot ==
As the title suggests, there is no plot per se; the battles are entirely gratuitous. The player is presented with a number of skirmish scenarios in various space locations. Missions are not linked with any particular narrative, nor are there any briefings, debriefings, or scripted sequences: the battles are purely gratuitous.

== Gameplay ==
Battle showing enemy ships to the right

Gratuitous Space Battles challenges players with defeating opposing space fleets through careful pre-battle planning. For each skirmish or engagement, the player has a fixed budget and a maximum number of ships (pilots), as well as various other limitations or rules which influence the outcome of the battle. For example, a given environment may reduce the effectiveness of ship shields, or may reduce weapon ranges. Players must take this information into account when selecting and positioning the ships that form their own fleet. Once players have selected their ships and issued orders to the ships concerning how to engage the enemy fleet, the battle begins.

The battle itself proceeds completely without human interaction, with the outcome being determined entirely based on the initial configuration, rather than on player reflexes or mid-battle decisions. Players are only able to move the camera and speed up the gameplay to four times the normal speed. Customized fleets can be shared online for others to play with.

=== Honor ===
Gratuitous Space Battles encourages players to win battles using as few resources as possible by awarding honor for any unspent funds. That is, for each point of budgetary allocation which a player could have spent but did not, a point of honor is awarded upon victory. The game tracks the maximum honor previously awarded per battle at each difficulty level, so players can continue to earn more only by beating their previous best. After amassing a sufficient quantity of honor, it can then be traded (spent) to unlock new ship modules, new ship hull configurations, and new playable alien races.

=== Ship design ===
As Gratuitous Space Battles consists solely of combat in space (foregoing any of the other elements of a traditional 4X game), it gives players a great deal of flexibility in how ships are designed. For a given playable race, players have a number of hull configurations from which to choose, made up of three different sizes of ships (fighters, frigates, and cruisers). Different ship hulls have different numbers of mounting points for modules and weapons, as well as having various inherent characteristics (in the form of overall bonuses in specific areas). Shield generators, crew quarters, and reactors to power the ship are also able to be placed. Players must balance ship cost, weight, speed, power, crew, and offense/defense capabilities in deciding what combat role a given spacecraft will fulfill.

== Development ==
Gratuitous Space Battles began as a "dictator simulation" in late 2008 when Cliff "Cliffski" Harris was starting on his next game after Kudos 2. After only several weeks of work on the initial concept of a "Virtual Saddam" game, the title went in an entirely different direction and instead became a space strategy game.

As with many indie video game projects, development cost was a significant issue. After an initial experiment spending several hundred dollars to purchase stock spaceship models, Harris eventually solicited quotes from 3 different artists and selected the most expensive one. The user interface was constructed by Chris Hildenbrand, a UI expert, leaving Harris to do his own special effect and user module graphics.

To maximize performance and minimize texture swapping, the graphics engine was an entirely new DirectX 9 engine that was custom-developed for the game. It includes a variety of special case code to deal with the requirements of rendering ship and weapon graphics during battles.

== Reception ==
Reception

Aggregate score
Aggregator	Score
Metacritic	72

Review scores
Publication	Score
Destructoid	8/10
Eurogamer	70
GamesRadar+	7/10
Jay Is Games	4.8/5
bit-tech.net	8/10

The Eurogamer review noted that initially the choices faced by a player can be bewildering. Although there are tutorials, gameplay was far from intuitive. Eurogamer also thought the graphics were beautiful and that after a while the element of surprise tactics was missing. A GamesRadar review described it as a fleet-management game and felt it was suited for players that liked to tinker. The reviewer felt that the shipbuilding part of the game needed more clarification and that the battles can leave a player confused as to what worked and what didn't.

GamesTunnel described the graphics as spectacular and enjoyed the ability to zoom in on the action as well as the music. A DIYGamer reviewer thought the fight sounds could become annoying and that while the battle graphics were very good, the menus were unpolished. A Destructoid review appreciated the "precisely detailed ships" as well as the humour. The reviewer also drew attention to a lack of balance in single-player missions when only deploying masses of the large cruiser ships. A review at Jay Is Games described the game as "an excellent, deep, seriously fun space battle game" which was an "extremely tactical experience".

== Legacy ==
In 2024, designer Cliff Harris acknowledged Gratuitous Space Battles as the first example of the auto battler genre, preceding its development in the late 2010s.

In 2025, Harris announced a spiritual successor titled Ridiculous Space Battles, which had been in development since late 2023 and is planned to release in 2025.
