= Plague Inc. =

2012 video game

- App Store icon
- Developers: Ndemic Creations; Miniclip (Android 2012–2022)
- Publishers: Ndemic Creations; Miniclip (Android)
- Composers: Joshua Kaplan; Marius Masalar
- Platforms: iOS; Android; Windows Phone
- Release: iOS: 26 May 2012; Android: 4 October 2012; Windows Phone: 13 May 2015
- Genres: Real-time strategy, simulation
- Mode: Single-player

Plague Inc. is a real-time strategy simulation game developed and published by Ndemic Creations. The game was inspired by the 2011 film Contagion and the 2008 browser game Pandemic 2. The player creates and evolves a pathogen to annihilate the human population with a deadly pandemic. The game uses an epidemic model with a complex and realistic set of variables to simulate the spread and severity of the plague. It was released on 26 May 2012 for iOS, 4 October 2012 for Android and 13 May 2015 for Windows Phone.

An updated version, which released on home consoles and personal computer (PC), first released in 2015 as Plague Inc: Evolved and includes adjustments and additions to the gameplay. In 2017, the developer released a physical board game based on Plague Inc. titled Plague Inc.: The Board Game. In December 2018, the studio released Rebel Inc., a follow-up game with a political theme. In 2024, Ndemic Creations released a successor After Inc.

According to Ndemic Creations, Plague Inc. has been downloaded over 160 million times as of May 2021. The game was positively received by critics. The game has seen large surges of new users in several countries after significant virus outbreaks, such as the 2014–16 Ebola outbreak and the COVID-19 pandemic.

== Gameplay ==
Gameplay screenshot showing a map of the world, with infected countries in red

Plague Inc. is a strategy-simulation and action game in which the player indirectly controls a plague, which has infected patient zero and a scientist. The player can only choose between game modes and pathogens and complete the objective set by the game mode by deevolving the plague and adapting to various environments like hot and cold places. The goals include but are not limited to, infecting and killing the world's population with a pathogen, enslaving the world's population with the 'Neurax Worm', converting the world's population into zombies with the 'Necroa Virus' (which eventually became the basis for After Inc.), establishing the Planet of the Apes with the 'Simian Flu', or corrupting humanity with the 'Shadow Plague'. However, there is a time pressure to complete the game before humans (the opponent) develop a cure for the plague.

The developer has said it is 'a bit like the film Contagion except you are on the other side'. The film Contagion was a partial inspiration for the game, according to the developer. The developer has said the game was partially inspired by Pandemic 2, a browser-based Flash game released in 2008 by Dark Realm Studios.

=== Disease types ===
The player can use many different types of pathogens, each with its own advantages and disadvantages which influence evolution decisions. Initially, the player may only select bacteria. There are four modes of gameplay for each plague type. They are Casual, Normal, Brutal, and Mega Brutal; with Mega Brutal being accessed by clicking the yellow biohazard button under the Brutal icon. Subsequent pathogens are unlocked by winning the game with the previous one on Normal or Brutal Mode. These include viruses, fungi, parasites, prions, nano-viruses, and bio-weapons. There are also fictional special plague types, including the mind-controlling Neurax Worm, the zombie plague Necroa Virus, the "Simian Flu" from Rise of the Planet of the Apes, the vampire themed Shadow Plague, the crystalizing Xenolith, and the customizable Disease X from the 1.18.6 "The Cure" mode (note that The Cure is a separate game mode from the regular Plague Inc.).

== Development ==
Development most likely started in 2011 with the British creator, James Vaughan, working on the game in his afternoons and evenings. The game was released on 26 May 2012.

In July 2014, Ndemic Creations partnered with 20th Century Fox on an update themed as a tie-in to the film Dawn of the Planet of the Apes. Players cultivate the film's "Simian Flu" virus, which kills humans while making apes more intelligent. Players spread the virus to eradicate humans while helping apes survive and advance.

In 2017, the developer released a physical board game based on Plague Inc. titled Plague Inc.: The Board Game. (Note: Alternatively titled Plague Inc: The Board Game) $355,000 was raised for the board game on Kickstarter. According to developer James Vaughan, "[he] really wanted the challenge of making a physical game to go alongside the video game - especially as board games are getting increasingly popular now".

On 6 December 2018, Ndemic Creations released Rebel Inc., a follow-up game with a political theme based around the "complexities and consequences of foreign intervention and counter insurgency." In it, players must stabilize a post-war country while stopping insurgents from taking power. Though the game was originally only available on iOS, a port for Android devices was released on 11 February the following year.

On 28 February 2019, the studio announced that they would add an in-game scenario about vaccine hesitancy to the game, after a Change.org petition to do so gained over 10,000 signatures. On 24 March 2020, the studio announced that they would add a "cure mode" about stopping the plague outbreak due to the ongoing COVID-19 pandemic.

=== Plague Inc: Evolved ===
The remake Plague Inc: Evolved for Steam and consoles has similar gameplay to the original Plague Inc but includes several features not present in the mobile version, such as multiplayer.

=== Plague Inc. The Cure ===
On 11 November 2020, Ndemic Creations added a new game mode to the game, named "Plague Inc. The Cure" in which players play against the disease, attempting to cure it. Originally released on the mobile version only, the game mode was later brought to Evolved on PC via a downloadable content update on 28 January 2021. Ndemic released the DLC for free saying that ''Plague Inc: The Cure will be free for all Plague Inc. players until COVID-19 is under control.'' with the game as of the 28th of October 2022 no longer being free costing a base price of 3,29€ or $4.99.

=== Plague Inc. Outbreak Mode ===
On 24 November 2025, Ndemic Creations added another new game mode, named "Plague Inc. Outbreak Mode" which features gameplay similar to the base game, but have unique daily challenges where players must win with a pre-selected disease type, as well as being affected by modifiers that can grant both positive and negative gameplay effects. Players can also upgrade the strength of traits that can be evolved in future runs by winning daily challenges. While also originally released on the mobile version only, it was then brought to Evolved on PC as a free update on 15 December 2025.

== Reception ==
=== Critical reception ===
Reception

Aggregate score
Aggregator	Score
Metacritic	80/100

Review scores
Publication	Score
IGN	7/10
TouchArcade	4/5

Plague Inc received "generally favorable" reviews according to review aggregator website Metacritic, with an aggregated score of 80/100. Wired.com cited Plague Inc. as a notable independent developer success story as it "bucked the system by staying near the top of the charts in numerous countries for the entirety of its existence, pulling in millions in revenue while competing with the big players". It was #1 paid app for both iPhone and iPad in the U.S. for two weeks after launch. IGN said that "Killing billions has never been so fun". TouchArcade said that "Plague Inc. will snag your attention in all the right ways and keep it there". In December 2012, Plague Inc. was one of five games nominated for Best Strategy Game in IGN's Game of the Year 2012, both for mobile and for all platforms. It also won the 'Players Choice' award for best Mobile Strategy Game of 2012. Overall, Plague Inc. was the 15th most downloaded paid iPhone game of 2012 in the U.S. (and 18th on iPad). It was also the 76th highest-grossing game of 2012. In March 2013, the game went on to win multiple categories of the Pocket Gamer Awards, including Overall Game of the Year. It was the 5th most downloaded paid iPhone game in the US in 2013.

=== Sales ===
According to Ndemic Creations, Plague Inc. has been downloaded over 160 million times, as of May 2021. It has remained at the top of the charts worldwide for five years. Overall, it was the 15th most downloaded paid iPhone game of 2012 in the United States and the 5th most downloaded paid iPhone game of 2013 in the U.S. In 2014, it was the #3 best selling iPhone game in the U.S. and the #1 best selling iPhone app in China. In 2015, it was the 7th best selling iPhone game in the U.S. In 2016, it was the 4th best selling iPhone game there.

As of April 2019, Plague Inc. The Board Game has sold over 35 thousand copies.

In the wake of the COVID-19 pandemic in January 2020, Plague, Inc. became the top-selling app in the Chinese market, and saw increased sales and number of concurrent players on other platforms. The interest was believed to be from Chinese video gamers trying to find a way to deal with fears raised by the outbreak. Ndemic reminded players that while Plague Inc. was developed based on scientific understanding of the spread of infectious diseases, the game was not on par with any scientific model, and added links to the World Health Organization's website on their own website in response to people inquiring about the coronavirus. By February 2020, as the pandemic spread globally, Plague, Inc. had resurged to be the top paid app on the iOS app store, beating out Minecraft. In response to newfound interest in the game, Ndemic added a mode, developed in conjunction with WHO, about fighting off a pandemic from spreading, titled "The Cure", based on some of the scientific techniques and lessons learned from the coronavirus spread.

On 27 February 2020, the Chinese government forced the game to be removed from the App Store in China, with the Cyberspace Administration of China citing "illegal content" in the game, though they have not provided any further explanation to Ndemic. Plague, Inc. had been updated with a "Fake News" content update, which they had yet to authorize to release to China, which has been believed to be the reason behind the ban given China's stance on media that is derogatory of their state media.

=== Pandemic Flash game developer ===
Dark Realm Studios initially complained on Twitter to IGN reviewer Justin Davis about the Plague Inc. release, saying that the game was "just an attempt to cash in on Pandemic 2.5" due to similarities in gameplay between the titles. The reviewer responded with an article defending Plague Inc. and saying "there's no denying that it bears a close resemblance to Pandemic, but there is also no denying that it improves on that basic disease-spreading premise". Plague Inc. developer James Vaughan rejected the cash-in accusation.

In 2013, Dark Realm Studios said they did not consider Plague Inc. to be a clone and they "regard the situation as a learning opportunity".

=== Centers for Disease Control and Prevention appearance ===
In March 2013, James Vaughan, the developer of Plague Inc., was invited to talk at the Centers for Disease Control and Prevention (CDC) about Plague Inc. He spoke about how he had modeled the spread of infectious disease inside the game as well as how games like Plague Inc. can be used to inform and educate the public.

Following the talk, the CDC said that it was interested in Plague Inc. as "it uses a non-traditional route to raise public awareness on epidemiology, disease transmission, and diseases/pandemic information. The game creates a compelling world that engages the public on serious public health topics". The game itself got updated with official CDC news headlines and an in-game story where the CDC tracks down Patient Zero. The game became the number one selling app in China early during the epidemic phase of the COVID-19 pandemic in Wuhan, China; the company received so many inquiries that via its Twitter account it referred its users to the World Health Organization's website for information.

== Legacy ==
In 2024, Ndemic Creations released After Inc, which is set after the Necroa Virus apocalypse and involves rebuilding the world.
