= Plague Inc: Evolved =

2015 video game

- Developer: Ndemic Creations
- Publisher: Ndemic Creations
- Composers: Joshua Kaplan; Marius Masalar
- Engine: Unity
- Platforms: Xbox One; Microsoft Windows; macOS; Linux; PlayStation 4; Nintendo Switch
- Release: Xbox One; 18 September 2015; Windows, macOS, Linux; 18 February 2016; PlayStation 4; 31 May 2016; Nintendo Switch; 2 August 2019
- Genres: Real-time strategy, simulation
- Modes: Single-player, multiplayer

Plague Inc: Evolved is a 2015 real-time strategy simulation video game, developed and published by UK-based independent games studio Ndemic Creations. The game is a remake of the developer's previous game, Plague Inc., adapted for PC and consoles. In the game, the player creates and evolves a pathogen in an effort to destroy the world with a deadly plague. The game uses an epidemic model with a complex and realistic set of variables to simulate the spread and severity of the plague, and has attracted the attention of the CDC.

== Gameplay ==
Gameplay screenshot showing a map of the world, with infected countries in red. The user interface was optimized for console and PC.

The core game of Plague Inc: Evolved is the same as Plague Inc. – the player controls a plague which has infected patient zero. The player must infect and kill the whole world population by evolving the plague and adapting to various environments. However, there is a time pressure to complete the game before humans, the opponent, develop a cure for the plague. The developer has said that the game was inspired by Pandemic 2, a browser-based Flash game released in 2008 by Dark Realm Studios.

The game series has been praised by the Centers for Disease Control and Prevention who said "it uses a non-traditional route to raise public awareness on epidemiology, disease transmission, and diseases/pandemic information. The game creates a compelling world that engages the public on serious public health topics". The developer of the game was invited to give a talk at the CDC.

It also includes all of the expansion packs from the original Plague Inc. game.

=== Plague Inc: The Cure ===
On 28 January 2021, amid the COVID-19 pandemic, the DLC Plague Inc: The Cure was released wherein the player attempts to eradicate a rapidly spreading plague by creating a cure before they lose all of their "authority" due to too many people getting panicked about disease spread. The player can slow the spread of the plague by imposing health guidelines, public awareness schemes, and continental lockdowns. The paid DLC was initially offered free until COVID-19 was brought under control.

=== Plague Inc: Aliens & Anti-Vaxxers ===
On 7 April 2026, the second DLC Plague Inc: Aliens & Anti-Vaxxers was released, adding a new disease type and six new scenarios.

== Development and release ==
Plague Inc: Evolved went live on Steam Early Access on 20 February 2014.

In 2014, the developer used "almost half a million pieces of feedback and feature requests from players" to help him understand what players wanted from the game and said he was "only 50 percent of the way through the original Plague Inc. design document".

A multiplayer mode, titled "VS. mode" was added to the game on 1 December 2015. In this mode, two players compete to spread their own plague across the world, while preventing in-game humans from inventing a cure and trying to eradicate the other player's disease. The mode adds new genes, evolution and abilities to the game.

The 1.0 release took place on 18 February 2016.

On August 9, 2019, Ndemic Creations released Plague Inc: Evolved for the Nintendo Switch; gameplay is operated through the Switch's Joy-Con, or the touchscreen.

== Reception ==
Reception

Aggregate score
Aggregator	Score
Metacritic	XONE: 80/100

Review scores
Publication	Score
Eurogamer	7/10
GamesRadar+	4/5
Official Xbox Magazine (UK)	4/5

The Xbox One version of Plague Inc. Evolved has received "generally favorable reviews" from review aggregator Metacritic. Critics gave the game an average score of 80 out of 100.

In March 2016, the Italian edition of Eurogamer gave the game a 7 out of 10 score, praising the game for its relatively complex gameplay but mildly criticising it for a lack of depth caused by its origins as a mobile game.

In October 2015, GamesRadar+ rated the game a 4 out of 5, stating that the game is a "delicate balancing act".

The game experienced an increase in sales at the beginning of the COVID-19 pandemic. The developer chose to give Plague Inc. The Cure out for free on some platforms until the pandemic was under control.
