= President Elect (video game) =

1981 video game

- Developer: Strategic Simulations
- Publisher: Strategic Simulations
- Designer: Nelson G. Hernandez Sr.
- Platforms: Apple II, Commodore 64
- Release: 1981: Apple II; 1984: C64; 1987: 1988 Edition
- Genre: Political simulation
- Modes: Single-player, multiplayer

President Elect is a turn-based, political simulation game released by Strategic Simulations for the Apple II in 1981. A Commodore 64 port followed in 1984. The sequel, President Elect: 1988 Edition, was published in 1987.

== Description ==
President Elect gives the player the ability to play as various real historical, potential historical, or completely fictional presidential candidates during the Presidential campaigns from 1960 to 1984 (most versions also include the 1988 campaign). Players are given the option of playing a "Historical" or "Ahistorical" scenario for each of the given years. Under the "Historical" option, the candidates, as well as economic and foreign policy conditions, and the status of the incumbent, are fixed. During an "Ahistorical" session, all of those variables can be determined by the player (for example, the player can choose a 1984 race between an incumbent Republican President Ronald Reagan, versus a Democratic Senator Edward M. Kennedy, in the midst of an unpopular war and an economic boom). Alternatively, players can select the option of creating a fictional presidential candidate (or a real candidate from outside of the game's timeframe), through the selection of various political, personal, and geographic attributes (somewhat in the manner of creating an RPG player character). In addition, there is the option of selecting an "Ahistorical" set of candidates within the otherwise "Historical" conditions of the selected year. The game is preset with not only all the major candidates of the elections covered by the span of the game, but also a number of hypothetical candidates from across the time frame, such as Jerry Brown, Gary Hart, and Howard Baker.

1968 Presidential election simulation, MS-DOS version

The game can be played with either two or three candidates (for example, the "Historical" scenarios for 1968 and 1980 include third party candidates George C. Wallace and John Anderson, respectively, and "Ahistorical" scenarios for any year can include the addition of a third party candidate), and the computer can control any or all of the candidates (thus allowing for the possibility of a non-player, straight simulation of an electoral scenario), meaning the game can be played by one, two, or three players.

Gameplay centers on the activity of dispersing PAPs ("Political Action Points"), which are approximately equivalent to campaign funds, in terms of their relationship to real life presidential campaigning, as well as scheduling personal, campaign visits to various states. Additionally, at the end of each of the nine, week-long, post-Labor Day game turns, there is a potential debate phase.

The role of the vice-presidential running mate is extremely limited, in that the running mate's identity is never given, but rather is simply represented by his or her being from a particular state, thus giving the ticket an electoral advantage in that particular state, and to a lesser extent in the other states within the region of the running mate's home state (for purposes of the game, the country is broken up into seven different regions, corresponding to: New England, the Mid-Atlantic, the South, the Industrial Midwest, the Great Plains, the Mountain States, and the Pacific Coastal States), although the vice presidential candidate's role in any state or region other than his own is nonexistent. The vice presidential candidate can tour foreign countries which if favourable gives an advantage in the elections. A foreign tour can also be performed by presidential candidate, but it shortens the election campaigning that can be taken up by him for that particular week depending on the number of days for which the tour is taken up. Foreign tour costs PAPs, the amount of which is dependent on the number of days. A failed foreign tour can negatively impact polls, while a successful tour can cause a given candidate to see a polling surge.

== Reception ==
Computer Gaming World found in 1981 that incumbency was the most important factor in winning elections in the original version of President Elect. The review began with the results of a simulated election in which Ronald Reagan won reelection in 1984 with 525 electoral votes from 49 states and 55% of the popular vote, versus Walter Mondale's 13 electoral votes (from Washington, D.C., and Minnesota) and 44%. The results of the real 1984 election were very similar, with the same candidates receiving the same electoral votes from the same states, and a 59%/41% popular vote.

In 1996, Computer Gaming World declared President Elect the 131st-best computer game ever released.

== Sequel ==
SSI released President Elect: 1988 Edition in 1987.

== See also ==
- The Political Machine series
