= Kudos 2 =

2008 video game

Kudos
- Developer: Positech Games
- Designer: Cliff Harris
- Artist: Jamie McKelvie
- Composer: Jesse Hopkins
- Platforms: Windows, MacOS
- Release: Windows: UK: 1 October 2008; WW: 16 October 2008; Mac: WW: 10 April 2009
- Genre: Social simulation
- Mode: Single player

Kudos 2 is a 2008 is a video game developed by Positech Games. It is a social simulation game and the sequel to Kudos, in which players guide a character through the ages of 20 to 30 by managing their daily life. Upon release, the game received positive reviews, with critics praising its accessibility and realistic tone, and critiquing available options for employment or social interaction.

== Gameplay ==
Gameplay screenshot

Kudos 2 is a social simulation game in which players control the life of a character between the ages of twenty to thirty. The objective of the game is for players to manage aspects of their life, including their work, education and social circle. Players select a character from a template of male and female models, and customise their hair, clothing, home town and currency. Each day, players can choose to perform social activities, such as going out, visiting an attraction, or interacting with friends or romantic interests, look for work or attend a job. Players can also sign up for classes to improve skills required for higher-paying jobs. Choices have impacts on the player's mood, relationships, physical health and hygiene, requiring players to balance activities. The game introduces new features compared to Kudos, including a visual overhaul, the ability to change the look of the player character, and additional traits, likes and dislikes for the player and non-player characters.

== Development ==
Kudos 2 was developed by Positech Games, the studio of British independent developer Cliff Harris. Harris stated that the design goals of the sequel were to add "greater depth of variety" to activities and careers, and improve the visuals and music of the game. Development took 10 months starting from January 2008, in a small team of artists Jamie McKelvie and Sprite Attack, composer Jesse Hopkins and one tester. Harris recounted that the redesign from Kudos involved significant changes, writing almost all the source code from scratch.

Kudos 2 was released internationally on Microsoft Windows in October 2008, initially only from the Positch Games webiste. A Steam re-release was launched in September 2023. Harris stated the game was the first title released to receive modest sales, although expressed a desire not to return to the concept due to development being "the hardest work over the longest time" of any project to date.

== Reception ==
Reception

Review scores
| Publication | Score |
|---|---|
| GamesRadar+ | 3.5/5 |
| Gamezebo | 4/5 |
| Softpedia | 5/5 |

Describing Kudos 2 as "addictive", Softpedia enjoyed the pacing of the game and its tone in resembling the "rules of reality" whilst still managing to be fun. However, they considered some choices had "illogical" consequences, such as paying to watch television or have a bath. GameZebo wrote that the game was "incredibly deep yet completely accessible", enjoying the simplicity of the gameplay, its range of options, and replay value, although found the gameplay around employment was less enjoyable. GamesRadar praised the realism of Kudos 2 and highlighted its "fresh visual style", but considered it could have featured greater variation to "make it worthwhile", faulting the game's social interactions.
