= Mitu Khandaker =

Game designer

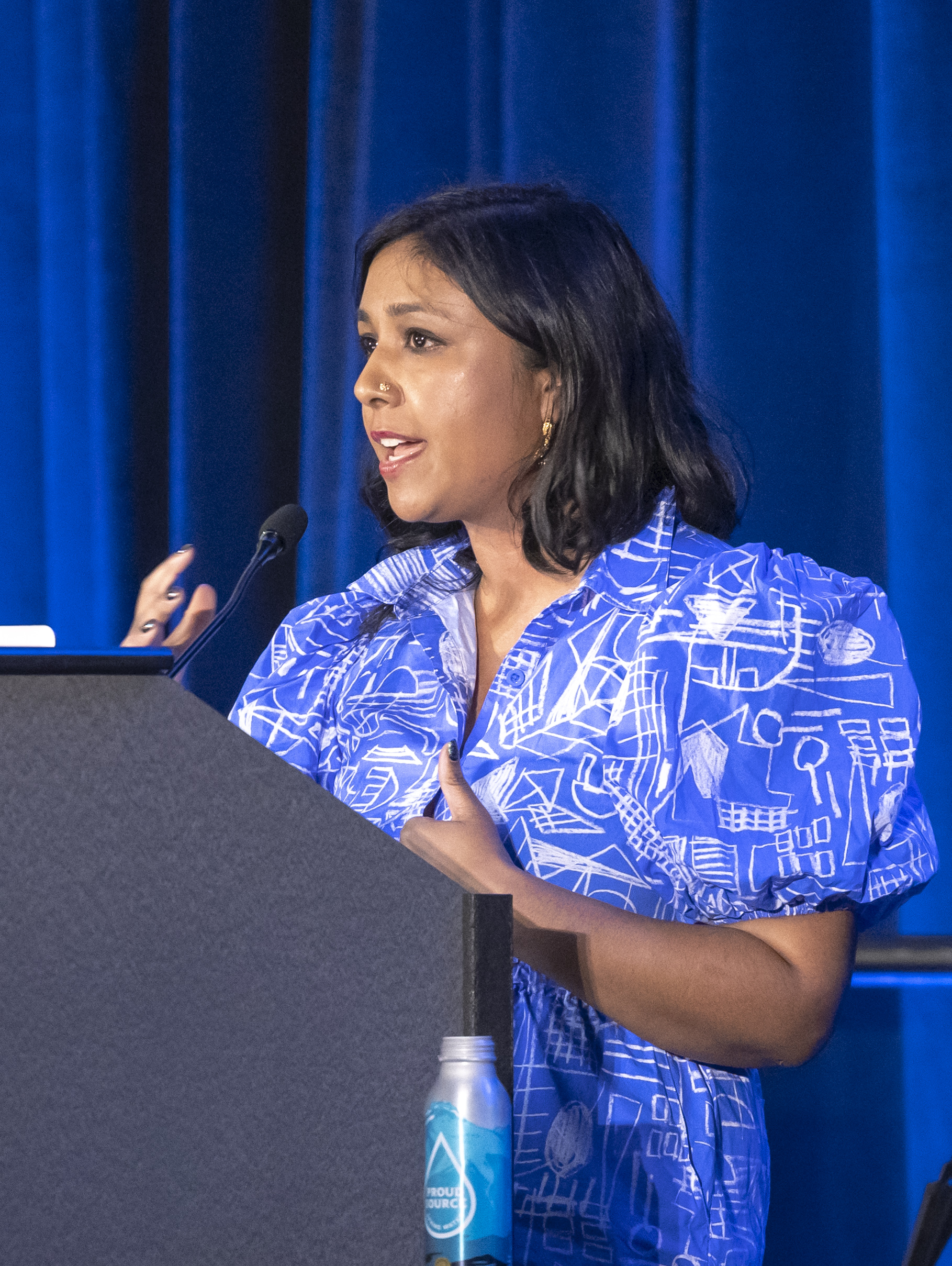
Mitu Khandaker speaking at the Game Developers Conference 2024.

Mitu Khandaker is a British game designer and engineer who is the founder of The Tiniest Shark and Glow Up Games. She is an Associate Arts Professor at NYU Tisch School of Arts, specifically within the Game Center. During her time at NYU, she was also the Chief Creative Officer at Spirit AI, an artificial intelligence London-based company that aims to fight cyberbullying behaviors to foster safer online communities.

Khandaker was featured in the 2021-2022 #IfThen Exhibit which celebrates women innovators in STEM, has been interviewed at GameCity for her work on Redshirt, and has won the Breakthrough BAFTA and Creative English Trailblazer awards.

== Education ==
Khandaker received her master's degree in computer engineering from the University of Portsmouth, where she also later received her PhD in game design.

== Career ==
Khandaker was the founder and sole-developer of The Tiniest Shark. In 2013–2014, The Tiniest Shark developed and found success launching a video game called Redshirt which is a science-fiction social networking game.

Glow Up Games is a mobile/XR studio that creates games and narrates stories for diverse audiences. It was co-founded by Khandaker and Latoya Peterson. In collaboration with HBO, Glow Up Games launched a mobile game called Insecure: The Come Up which is based on the HBO series Insecure. The game allows users to play as Issa Dee, the fictional main character of the show, as she creates a life in L.A. The star of the show, Issa Rae, was involved in the development of the game as a consultant.
