= President Elect: 1988 Edition =

1987 video game

- Publisher(s): Strategic Simulations
- Release: 1987
- Genre(s): Simulation, strategy

President Elect: 1988 Edition is a video game written by Nelson Hernandez and published by Strategic Simulations in 1987. It is an updated version of the 1981 game President Elect.

== Gameplay ==
President Elect: 1988 Edition is a game in which the 1988 Republican primaries and Democratic primaries, and the 1988 United States presidential election are simulated. The player can choose from any presidential election from 1960 to 1988 inclusive. The election can be either historical or ahistorical (the latter effectively a custom scenario).

President Elect: 1988 Edition was released in 1987 for the Apple II and Commodore 64, as well as for the Atari ST and MS-DOS computers. The 1988 Edition did not change gameplay at all from the earlier President Elect, but added the historical Reagan vs. Mondale 1984 election, with a new 1988 scenario with no historical candidates. The game also added new playable candidates, such as Bill Clinton, Bruce Babbitt, Michael Dukakis, Richard Gephardt, Geraldine Ferraro, Jack Kemp, and Oliver North.

== Reception ==
Wyatt Lee reviewed President Elect: 1988 Edition for Computer Gaming World, stating that "President Elect 1988 Edition is a stimulating, educational, and challenging experience of American presidential politics. If you follow political events with any interest at all, you owe it to yourself to play this game, at least, once".

President Elect author Nelson Hernandez—calling himself "the best predictor of presidential elections in the country"—claimed that, with the 1988 edition of the game, in July 1988 he predicted the electoral and popular votes of the election that year within 1% each of the actual results.

Orson Scott Card favorably reviewed the 1988 edition of President Elect for Compute!. While he criticized aspects of the game's design, he noted that the game accurately simulated how "the strongest forces", like the economy, "are completely out of the players' control ... that's the way it works in the real world".
