= Masters of the World =

2013 video game

- Official box art
- Developer(s): Eversim
- Publisher(s): Eversim
- Series: Geo-political simulator
- Platform(s): PC
- Release: 8 March 2013
- Genre(s): Government simulation game; real-time strategy
- Mode(s): Single-player, multiplayer

Masters of the World, also known as Geo-Political Simulator 3, is the third installment of the Geo-political simulator series. This government simulation game, like its predecessors, puts the player in the role of any nation's head of state or head of government. French, German, Spanish, Italian, Japanese, and Russian versions of the game were also released.

== Gameplay ==
The game has overhauled its game interface from the previous installments. Together with most features of its predecessors, the game has new features including the ability to manage more than one country simultaneously. Players are able to be the head of state of 175 countries, and make social, cultural, economical and military decisions. The possibility of a bicameral parliament and various new social policies were implemented.

== Reception ==
Reception

Review scores
Publication	Score
IGN	6.3/10
RiotPixels	66/10

Like its predecessors, the game received mixed reviews. Claudio Chianese, writing for IGN Italia, criticized the game's interface, graphics, and bugs.
