= CyberJudas =

1996 video game

- Developer: D.C. True
- Publisher: Merit Studios
- Designers: Robin Antonik; Charlie Athanas; Brad Stock; Glenn Doren
- Series: Shadow President
- Platform: MS-DOS
- Release: NA: June 25, 1996; EU: 1996
- Genre: Presidential simulation
- Mode: Single-player

CyberJudas is a presidential simulation video game for MS-DOS-compatible computers, and is the sequel to Shadow President. CyberJudas contains many of the same cyberpunk/dark science fiction elements of the original game, but adds themes of espionage and treason.

== Gameplay ==
The player takes the role of the President of the United States of America, and must handle an ongoing timeline of world events by making political decisions and engaging in diplomatic, economic and military interactions with other computer-controlled states. The player is attended by a cabinet of computer-controlled advisors, each with their own area of responsibility, who will offer advice on actions to be taken.

The game features three modes of play. In the Presidential Simulator, the only goal is to remain in power by maintaining sufficient popularity to avoid electoral defeat, impeachment or assassination. If popularity is maintained, the player's term as president can continue beyond the US' real-life limit of two terms, however terms must be consecutive: being voted out ends the game. In the Presidential Simulator, the player's cabinet work in the player's interest and deliver relatively unbiased advice.

The second mode is Cabinet Wars, in which each member of the player's cabinet has their own political perspective and agenda, and will attempt to manipulate the player's decisions for their own ends.

The final mode, and the source of the game's title, is the CyberJudas Gambit. In this mode, one member of the cabinet is an outright traitor, working directly against the player and the US. In this mode, the 'CyberJudas' will attempt to create catastrophic situations for which the player will be blamed. As well as successfully managing the day-to-day concerns of the US, the player in this mode must also identify and defeat the CyberJudas.

== Reception ==
Reception

Review scores
Publication	Score
GameSpot	8/10
Computer Game Review	70/100

Tasos Kaiafas of Computer Game Review opined, "CyberJudas does show its age, which may have a dual effect." He found it technically dated, but argued that its gameplay attains "a level that transcends today's viscerally oriented 3-D worlds."
