= Redshirt (video game) =

2013 social simulation game

- Developer: Mitu Khandaker (The Tiniest Shark)
- Publisher: Positech Games
- Engine: Unity
- Platforms: Windows, MacOS, iOS
- Release: November 13, 2013
- Genre: Social simulation game
- Mode: Single-player

Redshirt is a social simulation game developed by Mitu Khandaker, developing under the company name The Tiniest Shark, and published by Positech Games for Windows, MacOS, and iOS. The game follows the player's custom character as they work through a fictional social media account as they try to "climb the ladder" on a space station. The game's title refers to a redshirt, a stock character in fiction who dies soon after being introduced.

Mitu Khandaker was inspired to create Redshirt after her experience from working at a social media startup. The game received mixed reviews from critics, who felt that the game had mostly shallow mechanics, despite generally complimenting its successfully focused nature on what it was lampooning.

== Gameplay ==
Redshirt is a social simulation game, where the player controls a new character on a fictional space station in the future who is obsessed with "Spacebook" (a satire of Facebook). The player's character interacts with people and things on the ship through the Spacebook. As players interact with the environment, they gain interests and skills which help them advance throughout the game.

== Development ==
Mitu Khandaker, the lead developer of the game, had been interested in the dynamics that social networks and games that emulated social behavior presented. Mitu had previously worked for a social media start-up, which had helped to inspire her work on Redshirt. She pitched the idea of a fake social network that was full of non-playable characters to Positech Games, who supported the idea but asked her to add a sci-fi theme to the work. She intentionally called the game a "disempowerment fantasy", focusing players on the banality of the future instead of presenting powerful opportunities to players. Red Dwarf was a large influence in the tone of the game, along with Star Trek references and social media in general. Mitu stressed in an interview that the game was designed to show how social networks use people as resources instead of highlighting them as people.

== Reception ==
In a review for IGN, Rowan Kaiser felt that Redshirt was a "generally successful experiment in social simulation", but noted that there were some glitches (although they also commended the developer for quickly patching them). GameSpot's Britton Peele was more negative, noting that the game became repetitive, although commending the game for being an apt parody.
