= President Forever 2008 + Primaries =

2006 video game

- Cover art
- Developer: TheorySpark
- Publisher: TheorySpark
- Series: President Forever + Primaries
- Platform: Windows
- Release: NA: 2006
- Genre: Political simulation
- Mode: Single-player

President Forever 2008 + Primaries is a political simulation game that incorporates realism mixed with fiction. It simulates United States presidential elections and primary elections in 1960, 1980, 1992, 2000, 2004, and 2008. President Forever 2008 was developed and released by TheorySpark, a developer specializing in political games, on October 12, 2006. The game is an updated version of the original President Forever.

Players must win enough Electoral College votes to win the election, or for smaller parties or candidates a successful campaign may require as little as achieving 5% nationally. The player is responsible for all aspects of their chosen candidate's campaign, from planning and buying advertising to recruiting high-profile and grassroots supporters.

== Gameplay ==
The main screen showing the players activities

Starting on October 1, 2007, a successful candidate must develop strategies that will out-wit their opponents and focus their resources by choosing which states they will target and how much expend on each one. Players can recruit new foot soldiers in individual states to help boost the momentum and draw voters based on local efforts. To help spread the campaign message across all states in a candidate's strategy, a player can use big-name crusaders to travel from state to state to help drum up popular support.

Like most strategy games, all candidates have a set of attributes that help them when performing activities throughout the game. Attributes such as leadership, integrity, charisma and experience remain static throughout the game, but other attributes like issue familiarity and debating skill can be developed by practice and research. All attributes work together to help a candidate during debates, speeches and their vulnerability to high-powered scandals.

News stories generated from campaign trail.

To effectively win supporters, a player must decide on the theme of their campaign as well as their beliefs on the core issues. Changing a candidates position on hot issues will help attract voters to their campaigns, but drastic shifts from the candidates original beliefs will cause the candidate's campaign to be discredited due to "flip-flopping". The media will release high-profile news stories which will damage a candidate's national momentum and voters will become alienated.

Creating ads to boost campaign momentum.

Electoral success depends partly on a candidate’s momentum in each state. Players can build momentum through advertising, state visits, and fundraising. Advertisements may promote the player’s candidate or criticize leading opponents, although negative campaigns can backfire and damage the candidate’s public image. Visiting the voters in their states, or barnstorming, works well towards drawing voters and also helps to boost the morale of the candidate's foot soldiers in that state. Barnstorm too often though, and your message will fall on deaf ears.

A candidate also needs to work on establishing a campaign by investing time, money, and Command Points. An established campaign brings in more fundraising dollars and provides the player with more Command Points to work with.

The game includes a candidate editor which allows the player to alter the attributes or characteristics of each candidate as well as parties. The editor was released as part of an update to the game. Many scenarios are created and published to http://campaigns.270soft.com/ where players are able to download and play the scenario. The candidate editor allows flexibility in editing, although for building scenarios, many users download Campaigns Forever, an alternate software made by the same publisher.

== Playable candidates ==
The United States 2008 scenario includes most of the candidates who decided to run as well as those who declined to run. Candidates that are still officially running are turned on by default and are all playable. Withdrawn candidates are turned off by default, but can be turned on by the player to run a purely fictional race.

Republican candidates

- Rudy Giuliani, former Mayor of New York City.
- Mike Huckabee, former Governor of Arkansas.
- Duncan Hunter, Representative from California.
- John McCain, Senator from Arizona, 2008 republican candidate for president.
- Ron Paul, Representative from Texas and 1988 Libertarian Presidential nominee.
- Mitt Romney, former Governor of Massachusetts, 2012 republican nominee for president.
- Tom Tancredo, Representative from Colorado.
- Fred Thompson, former Senator from Tennessee.
- George Allen (off), former Senator from Virginia.
- Sam Brownback (off), Senator from Kansas, withdrew October 19, 2007, and later endorsed John McCain.
- Bill Frist (off), former Senator from Tennessee.
- Newt Gingrich (off), former Speaker of the House from Georgia.

Democratic candidates

- Joe Biden, Senator from Delaware, future vice president and president of the United States and winner of the 2020 presidential election
- Hillary Clinton, Senator and former First Lady from New York, 2016 presidential candidate.
- Christopher Dodd, Senator from Connecticut.
- John Edwards, former Senator from North Carolina and 2004 Democratic Vice-Presidential Nominee.
- Dennis Kucinich, Representative from Ohio.
- Barack Obama, Senator from Illinois, was elected president in 2008
- Bill Richardson, Governor of New Mexico, former Representative from New Mexico and former United States Ambassador to the UN.
- Wesley Clark (off), retired General of the United States Army. Declined to run and endorsed Senator Hillary Clinton.
- Evan Bayh (off), Senator from Indiana, former Governor of Indiana. Declined to run and endorsed Senator Hillary Clinton.
- Al Gore (off), former Vice President of the United States and 2000 Democratic Presidential Nominee.
- John Kerry (off), Senator from Massachusetts and 2004 Democratic Presidential Nominee.
- Mark Warner (off), former Governor of Virginia.
- Tom Vilsack (off), former Governor of Iowa, withdrew February 23, 2007, and endorsed Senator Clinton.

Libertarian candidate

- Bob Barr (off)
- Wayne Allyn Root (off)
- Mary Ruwart (off)

Constitution Party candidate

- Chuck Baldwin (off)

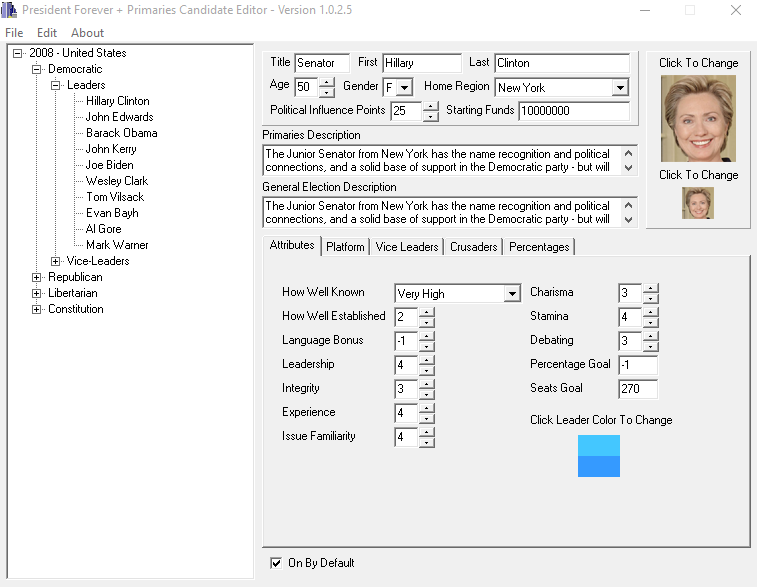
The candidate editor allows users to alter certain conditions in any chosen scenario.

== Development ==
The game engine was developed with enough complexity to accurately model voter affiliation, but the flexibility of the game design allows for players to create their own fictional scenarios as well as the ability for players to share their modded scenarios with each other. As well as a number of user created scenarios based on the game's default map, the modding community has produced a number of unique and original scenarios using TheorySpark's Campaigns Forever tool.

== Reception ==
Reviewers have found the game to be technical and geared towards 'hardcore' political gamers. Generation Gamerz's Fareed Guyot described it as "a political wonk's dream." He found the game addictive, stating "Like SimCity and the Tycoon series, this game is like watching the monkeys at the zoo, it's hard to turn away".

The Philadelphia Inquirer's Dennis McCauley found the game fun for himself and a good opportunity for educators, saying that in the final analysis "President Forever will keep political wonks glued to their PC screens" and that it's "a terrific option for teaching the political process in the classroom."

The Seattle-Post Intelligencer similarly said that "this ultra in-depth election simulation game is just the thing for the armchair politico who's always dreamed of running a campaign of his or her own."

Independent gaming website Game Tunnel's writers found the game detailed but difficult to comprehend, awarding a combined score of 6.5 out of 10. Mike Hommel said "I think this game is probably the ultimate for the very hardcore niche it serves". He found the game confusing and the manual unfit to explain the complexities of the game, he suggested the game needs a tutorial. John Bardinelli found the game "... a bit overwhelming for a non-politico.", adding "President Forever is a feast for the politically minded gamer, but everyone else will be left scratching their heads." William Usher was more positive, stating "It's amazing how much depth and detail went into this very aesthetically bare-boned game."

== Sequel ==
The President Forever series would be developed further in the coming years after the release of 2008 + Primaries; 80soft would develop their next release in President Forever 2012 + Primaries both in private and via website updates throughout 2011 - 2014. Around 2014, they announced the next era of Forever in President Forever 2016, which would release under the company 270soft. It featured a similar small-window design like the older 2008 and 2012 games, but with several new additions taken from 270soft's other recent releases like Prime Minister Forever - Australia 2013 and Congress Forever 2012.

President Infinity would make a major turning point for the 270soft company, as it would launch a brand new era for the game series and overall engine of the company's products for the next half-decade. Releasing around 2016, Infinity featured a variable window size alongside an expanded Campaign Editor suite, modern design layout devoid of any Forever holdover designs (which 2016 had quite a few), and (most importantly) the Infinity title fully departed from the then decade-old series. President Infinity would be followed by Congress Infinity, a follow-up and modernization of Congress Forever. For a time, both products could be bought together for a discounted bundle price - completing the collection of Presidential/Senatorial/Governor election scenarios and nation-level Senate and House scenarios.

President Infinity would also spawn two modernized classic 270soft products in Prime Minister Infinity - Canada and Prime Minister Infinity - U.K.. Both games were modernized versions of older Forever titles; PMI - Canada received most of the scenarios availabel in Prime Minister Forever - Canada 2008, while Prime Minister Infinity - U.K. received most of the campaigns featured in Prime Minister Forever - British 2010. Although separate games, their internal systems were similar, following a more unified system.

In 2020, 270soft began releasing a "modern" iteration of President Infinity featuring a full screen mode (borderless), new graphics, and new systems. Throughout 2020 these 'beta' versions would be released, updating various internal features and graphics alongside re-expanding the campaign editor in its' new bed. President Infinity 2020 would release as a 'complete' package - with multiple base upgrades from the then-retitled President Infinity - Classic. The game, like its Classic predacessor, would mark a step forward for the company into a new era.

Congress Infinity 2022 was the next step taken by 270soft, bringing Congress Infinity - Classic into the modern engine, Editor, and visual presentation of Infinity 2020. Releasing with the brand new 2020 and 2022 House and Senate scenarios, the game featured a brand new Editor suite and a base scenario count expanded from 8 to 12, along with many smaller internal features.

In the time between, 270soft would announce and begin development on A More Perfect Union, a community-tested historically-based decision game which promised players the ability to play through American history - from the founding of the nation in the 1772 era to the 2024 modern era. Although ambitious, the game would see multiple Alpha releases as the game received step-by-step advancements through its' systems, graphics, and engine.

President Infinity 2024 and Congress Infinity 2024 would release as the final step in the era of unified Infinity Election Games - featuring the 2024 Presidential, Senate, and House scenarios alongside an editor and game feature/design changelog. This would also be the first set of games released under the new company name, 270sims.

The most recent release, coming on October 27, 2026, was the next era of the Forever era. Released as an "Evergreen Legislative Election Game" and stylized as "Elections Forever", the game released with a combined 33 base scenarios - every single scenario from Congress Infinity 2024 alongside the new 2026 House and Senate scenarios, and all scenarios which came in both Prime Minister Infinity - Canada and U.K. The reported upside to all 4 nations being included in one game (U.S., U.K., Canada, and Australia) was that one could now purchase a single 270sims product rather than 3 to receive all the available content at once. This also came with promises from 270sims on X that future updates would focus on 4 main tasks: 1), bringing up to speed the U.K., Canadian, and Australian sections of the game (which were never updated past 2019), 2), updating pre-existing assets across legacy scenarios, 3), bringing the campaign editor up to speed, and 4), adding any future campaigns or legacy campaigns that were never included in the Infinity era.
