= Kudos (video game) =

2006 video game

- Developer: Positech Games
- Publisher: Positech Games
- Designer: Cliff "Cliffski" Harris
- Platforms: macOS, Windows
- Release: NA: July 17, 2006
- Genre: Social simulation
- Mode: Single player

Kudos is a video game developed by British-based Positech Games (the makers of Democracy). Its gameplay is very similar to games like The Sims. The game spawned a sequel, Kudos: Rock Legend, in 2007. In October 2008, Kudos 2 was released, featuring much improved character art by comic artist Jamie McKelvie.

== Gameplay ==
The basic principle of Kudos is that the player controls a 'virtual life' for ten years, starting at age 20, and ending at age 30. An accelerated calendar system plays out each day of those ten years (with only actually 7 days in each month). During each turn (which is a single day, or half-day on weekends) the player chooses from a range of solo and social activities, and responds to phone calls from friends regarding social invitations. The key to the game is that every single decision the player makes affects multiple aspects of their character's personality, mind and body. For example, going bowling may improve fitness and happiness, but reduce their level of energy, as well as have other subtler effects depending who else attended the event and the character's 'state' when they embark on the activity.

== Sequels ==
Kudos: Rock Legend
- Developer: Positech Games
- Publisher: Positech Games
- Series: Kudos
- Platforms: Macintosh, Microsoft Windows
- Release: NA: June 1, 2007
- Genre: Music simulation

Kudos: Rock Legend is a spinoff of the game Kudos. Unlike the previous Kudos game, however, this game allows the player to start their own rock/pop band.

The player begins as a vocalist with ambitions for becoming a rock star, setting a personal goal of achieving this in five years. The player then must hold auditions for other bandmates, including a drummer, a bassist, and a guitarist (required to continue), as well as a keyboardist, and a saxophone player (optional) the player must write enough songs to fill a "setlist" allowing him to play "gigs" at a first limited but later expanded number of venues. Once a sufficient number of songs have been written, and enough money has been made, the player can create an album which can be sold at gigs, along with T-shirts, sweatshirts, and posters, for additional profit. Although the game is either won or lost after five years, gameplay is allowed to continue after that.

- Developer: Positech Games
- Publisher: Positech Games
- Release: October 2008
- Genre: Social simulation

Kudos 2 is the sequel to Kudos. Its development began in January 2008 by Positech Games, and features many improvements over the previous game, including new 2D character art, more life choices, and an upgraded audio system.

Kudos 2 has many choices that affect both the player and the player's friends. The player can get a drink at the bar, go shopping, do housework, and even start dating. Unlocking some activities requires the player to have a specific relationship or item. While shopping, the player can shop in four different categories: music, general, pets, and books. The books and general section is greatly expanded from the original Kudos, including realistic images for magazines and over 60 books to buy. The player can socialize with friends and go see a movie of the player's choice, or even go to a restaurant, with a fully interactive menu and realistic prices. The player can also take educational courses for a small fee, including IT skills, Advanced Biology, and Public Speaking. With a good education and high IQ and confidence, the player can pursue in work over 200 different jobs in more than 10 fields including computing, sales, law, and medicine. The in-game dating system is similar to the original.

PC Gamer UK described the game as a perfect time waster.
