= Conflict: Middle East Political Simulator =

1990 video game

- Cover art
- Developer: PSI Software
- Publisher: Virgin Mastertronic
- Designer: David J. Eastman
- Platforms: MS-DOS, Atari ST, Amiga
- Release: 1990
- Genre: Government simulation game
- Mode: Single-player

Conflict: Middle East Political Simulator, often known as ConfMEPS or simply Conflict, is a turn-based government simulation game developed by PSI Software and published by Virgin Mastertronic in 1990 for MS-DOS, Atari ST, and Amiga (with extended graphics). Although the game is no longer commercially available, original designer David J. Eastman has encouraged players to download the PC version from "abandonware" sites. It can be run in emulator environments including DOSBox.

The game is set in 1997. The prime minister of Israel has just been assassinated, leaving the player to run the country as the new prime minister. The player's objective is to cause the defeat of the neighbouring four states, either by invasion (not necessarily by Israel, as the other states can and do invade each other) or political destabilisation.

== Gameplay ==
A screenshot of the Conflict: MEPS interface

Each game turn represents one month in real time. On each turn, the player decides what diplomatic, espionage and military actions to take with regard to the other countries in the game, and then ends the turn. The game engine then runs and presents the results. Each new turn begins with news about what has occurred, presented as a set of headlines.

Each country in the game has a diplomatic relationship with every other country, with that relationship varying from Military Pact (best) to War (worst), through a number of stages. In addition, there is a special relation mode, called "Attack means disaster", which seems to pertain when all nations with the ability of holding nuclear weapons do possess such. In that mode, all other relation forms become obsolete.

With each turn, the player sets Israeli diplomatic policy with regard to the other countries in the game. It is simple: Israel is either trying to improve a diplomatic relationship, keep it as it is, or make it worse. The outcome in the relationship for a turn depends upon Israeli policy set against that of the other country. Roughly US $100 million is removed from the monthly defense budget when diplomatic relations are being improved beyond Favourable. If a country's diplomats are acting aggressively toward Israel, relations will usually not budge, even if the player attempts to improve them. Bordering states, however, will gradually worsen their relations with Israel upon showing signs of aggression, until war is declared. Relations will not improve if Israel has troops stationed at the border. Some countries will on rare occasions end hostile behaviour towards Israel if the player stations a brigade at the border. If Israel successfully bombs Egypt or Syria's nuclear facilities, relations deteriorate one level on the next turn.

Some countries at war with another will be quick to form an alliance with Israel if their relations are Favourable. As a result, the relation will jump to Profitable (skipping Beneficial) on the next turn.

When a relationship is Profitable, the player can request a military pact. If this is accepted, then if Israel goes to war with a third country which also borders on the allied country, that country will in turn worsen its relationship to Lamentable and then declare war. No such obligation is placed upon the player, who can simply ignore wars their allies enter into.

When an allied country conquers an enemy state, it will often sever its pact with Israel and progressively worsen relations with an aggressive stance, the neighbouring countries doing this until war is declared on Israel. If the country's relationship with Israel is Favourable at an aggressive stance, but its stability rate is below Good, it will attempt to keep that relationship level due to its unstable leadership, even if the player attempts to worsen relations. Ordering a successful airstrike on Egypt's or Syria's nuclear installations will worsen relations at a much faster rate at this point and lead to war (unless the unstable governments collapse first).

During a war, the player may offer the enemy state a ceasefire, or vice versa. Once a ceasefire is signed between the warring states, diplomatic relations are restored to Satisfactory, but often with the opposing country's diplomats acting aggressively toward Israel. This will once again plunge both countries into war within the next couple of turns.

=== Espionage ===
Each country's government has a stability rating. If that rating falls to the lowest value, the government collapses and the country is out of the game. Within each turn, for each country in the game, Israel can choose to work to reduce the stability of the Government, keep it as it is, or increase the stability of the government. Also, each country has a level of insurgency organisation. When a country conquers an enemy state, its stability rating is upgraded to Very Solid, making it more difficult to destabilise. When a ceasefire between two countries is signed at the next UN Summit, the country that had the advantage on the last turn has its stability upgraded to Very Solid, while the other is downgraded to Good or below. If a country's stability rating is Weak or below, or if the insurgency in the country is at Guerilla Force or better, the player can attempt assassination of the country's leader or start a coup. If this attempt succeeds, the country collapses and is out of the game.

Once diplomatic and espionage policy is set, the player moves on to military actions. It is not possible to return to diplomacy and espionage once the player has moved to military actions. Israel has two ways of becoming unstable: a) the Palestinian problem - which can be increased by hostile nations, and b) insecurity among the Israeli public - which occurs if the player does not win a war within two or more years. If this instability is not resolved, the player faces the risk of being impeached or assassinated.

=== Military development ===
The player has two tasks to perform: the first is to spend the defense budget; the second is to set military actions with regard to the other countries in the game.

==== Defence budget ====
On each turn, the player receives a budget to spend on weaponry. Its size depends on the level of hostility in surrounding countries; if Israel is at war, or if another country is in the process of worsening diplomatic relations to declare war, the budget is large (US $300 million plus, per turn). If the level of hostility is low, and life is peaceful, the budget is small (US $100 million). As such, the defence budget awarded by the game is an indicator of the policy intent of neighbouring countries. When they are peaceful, the budget is low; when one or more countries is bent on war, the budget is high.

Weapons are purchased from the USA, UK, France or a private arms dealer. Each country sells weapons that it itself produces, except the private dealer, who is a South African providing access to Soviet weaponry. Each source offers a different range of weapons with different prices, and most countries will only offer better weapons after a certain number of purchases.

Weapons purchased are usually available by the next turn, except from the private dealer, which usually takes one or two turns to ship. The private dealer's advantage is the ability to sell arms to the player when an arms embargo is imposed on Israel.

==== Nuclear weapon research ====
Another factor in the game is the development of nuclear weapons. Most countries can run a nuclear weapon development program. One of the main ways to lose the game is for WMDs to be used, which often sets off a global nuclear holocaust. This can present a problem to players, as occasionally other countries than Israel attack each other with WMDs. It is possible to reduce this risk by destroying nuclear installations as they appear.

On each turn, the player decides whether to fund nuclear development for that month. The player's use of WMDs will either result in instant victory in the war in question or in a nuclear holocaust, which ends the game. If the player wins a war using a nuclear strike, the UN imposes an arms embargo on Israel, forcing the player to buy arms from the private dealer until the next UN summit.

Each year, Israel can choose to increase or decrease the GDP percentage allocated to the defence budget by 2%, and to increase the size of the Army by two units. Every year, the United States provides economic and military aid to Israel. This varies between nothing and US $4000 million, depending on how good Israel's relationship is with the US.

=== Palestinian problem ===
The game also models the problems caused by the Palestinian situation. The "Palestinian problem" is Israel's internal insurgency, just as the other countries have their insurgencies and concomitant government stability problems. As the player becomes unsuccessful and increasingly unpopular, the Palestinian situation worsens. Eventually, this causes the player to be deposed and thus to lose the game.

The player can deploy an army brigade to police the Gaza Strip and the West Bank, which is supposed to help reduce discontent. Once a brigade has been deployed, the player can choose soft or hard tactics. Hard tactics cause international outcry, presumably worsening relations with the US and so affecting the annual military grant.

During the annual UN summit, an offer can be made to form a Palestinian homeland, which permanently removes this problem and improves relations with the USA. The only disadvantage seems to be that if the player goes to war with the bordering country that offered the homeland territory, Israel finds itself at a territorial loss, usually two bars on the war progress meter.

=== Military actions ===
Prior to war, Israel can launch air strikes against bordering countries. These can target military, civilian or industrial sites if the diplomatic relationship with a country is very bad. Otherwise, only nuclear targets. Military strikes may destroy only a very few army units. Civilian and industrial strikes are done particularly to worsen diplomatic relationships.

Nuclear targets can be attacked at any time, and doing so reins in or even eliminates the development of that country's nuclear program. However, if the country has a mushroom cloud icon in place of a nuclear installation icon, this means that it has functioning warheads and the player can no longer cripple their nuclear development. This can happen if the player's order for a nuclear installation airstrike fails on two consecutive turns.

If the diplomatic relationship with a country is bad enough, and there are Israeli troops deployed on the border, Israel can invade, or be invaded. This triggers war. A country can only invade countries with a shared border. The four states neighbouring Israel in Conflict are Egypt, Jordan, Syria and Lebanon.

Libya, Iraq, and Iran are also present in the game, and can invade their own neighbours, but they have no common border with Israel and so cannot be invaded by the player and do not have to be defeated to win the game.

When war breaks out, certain unit types attack certain other unit types in the opposing army. So, for example, anti-tank helicopters destroy enemy tanks, while losing a certain number of their own number in the process.

== Reception ==
Alan Emrich reviewed the game for Computer Gaming World: "Conflict is not striving to be a realistic simulation. It is meant to be an amusing exercise in cold war politics set in a futuristic Middle East environment. It is fast playing, easy to learn, entertaining and not to be taken too seriously."

In a 1994 survey of war games, Computer Gaming World gave Conflict three stars out of five, stating that it was "Quick and fun to play" but not compatible with faster computers of that era.
