= Big Pharma (video game) =

2015 simulation video game

- Developer: Twice Circled
- Publishers: Positech Games; Klabater (console)
- Designer: Tim Wicksteed
- Engine: Unity
- Platforms: Microsoft Windows, OS X, Linux, Xbox One, Nintendo Switch, PlayStation 4
- Release: Microsoft Windows, OS X, Linux: WW: August 27, 2015; Xbox One: WW: December 4, 2019; Nintendo Switch, PS4: WW: December 5, 2019
- Genres: Puzzle game, construction and management simulation
- Mode: Single-player

Big Pharma is a simulation game developed by Twice Circled and published by Positech Games where the player builds a drug factory. The game was released on August 27, 2015.

== Game mechanics ==
An example of a factory with multiple production lines

In Big Pharma, the player takes the role of manager of a pharmaceutical company, producing medications from raw materials. Raw materials have intrinsic positive (e.g., "Reduces coughs") and negative (e.g., "Induces drowsiness") effects that present themselves when the material is within a range of concentrations, with possible concentrations spanning a 0-to-20 scale. Most of the positive benefits can be enhanced to yield even more desirable effects, or negative side effects can be outright removed, by bringing the material to a specific concentration range and applying an indicated process; some formulas further require the addition of a catalyst material which itself carries positive and negative effects. Materials can also be mixed to combine positive and negative benefits to create more potent drugs. The goal in the mixing and preparation of materials is to discover formulas that have their positive effects as close to their maximum potency concentration as possible while either eliminating side effects or bringing the material's concentration as far away from the side effects' maximum potency levels as possible.

The player produces the drugs using an assembly line approach with various equipment that can modify the concentration of the material, combine materials, rearrange the effects of a material to determine how effects combine when mixed, analyze materials to determine maximum potency levels, and finally prepare the material in pill form for delivery. This is done in an isometric perspective depicting a floorplan with various ports along the edges that can be used to bring in materials or ship out completed drugs. Materials are transported via conveyor belts between the processing units. Added building space can be purchased with in-game funds. The player can click on processes or materials to evaluate their current state, thus giving them the ability to debug the production line. Once the player has produced a complete pill from specific materials for the first time and delivered it to an output port, they are given the opportunity to name the product. This product is then sold on the game's virtual market. The product is rated on a letter-grade based on the effectiveness and lack of side effects as well as current market demand. The production lines operate in real-time, such that while the player can pause the game to arrange equipment within a production line, the game while running tracks the movement of each unit of material through the production line and only considers each unit as a product when it reaches the end of the production line.

In the larger game, the player must build up these drug production lines to maintain a profit and allow them to build additional lines. Scenarios in the game include competing companies that will also be releasing prescription drugs that will impact the profitability of the player's products. For example, if other companies have released a cold remedy drug, the market may be too saturated for a better cold remedy to succeed. The player can review what market demand there is for specific remedies to tailor productions toward those goals. In addition, the player can manage a research tree that enables more effective process equipment and other benefits to be built, and send out explorers to research on new possible ingredients to build from. The game includes a number of preset scenarios (such as reached a financial milestone after a number of years of operation) at various difficulty levels as well as the ability to create a custom open-ended game.

An expansion, "Marketing And Malpractice", was released on 26 April 2016. This expansion added Executives as part of the company which can be used to market the drugs produced by the player's production lines, as well as to try to manipulate and corner the market.

== Reception ==
Big Pharma has a score of 72% on Metacritic, and scored an 8/10 from IGN Spain.
