= On the Campaign Trail =

1988 video game

- Publisher: Campaigns & Elections
- Release: 1988
- Genre: Simulation

On the Campaign Trail is a 1988 video game published by Campaigns & Elections.

== Gameplay ==
On the Campaign Trail is a game in which a senatorial campaign is depicted taking place in a fictitious state.

== Development ==
In 1987, On the Campaign Trail was developed as a tool at Kent State University's political campaign management program, and engaged students in decision-making regarding the campaigns for United States Senate elections between 1970 and 1986.

== Reception ==
Wyatt Lee reviewed the game for Computer Gaming World, and stated that "Frankly, On The Campaign Trail is an awesome program that can teach players more about politics than several college courses."
