= Shadow President =

1993 video game

- Developer: DC True
- Publisher: DC True
- Designers: Robin Antonick; Brad Stock
- Series: Shadow President
- Platform: MS-DOS
- Release: NA: February 1993
- Genre: Geopolitical simulation
- Mode: Single-player

Shadow President is a geopolitical simulation video game released in 1993 for the MS-DOS by DC True containing elements of cyberpunk and dark science fiction.

The game has a sequel called CyberJudas.

== Gameplay ==
Failing to keep the governments of the world peaceful with each other may result in a "hot war"; the Soviet Union is invading Japan in this screenshot.

The game puts the player in the role of the President of the United States in a situation loosely based on the Cold War and the early 1990s. Using a timeline that starts during the end of the Ogaden War, players can prepare Kuwait to be invaded by Iraq during Operation Desert Shield. After dealing with the Iraqi adversaries, the player can opt to overthrow the military overlords and political cartels that are keeping the people of South America and Africa in relative poverty.

Being popular enough to be re-elected is a vital component of the game, though re-elections can be disabled which in turn greatly reduces the effect of popularity. Managing the budget of the United States, sending aid to foreign countries, dealing with diplomatic crises, and even fighting wars are a largely unavoidable aspect of the game. The player starts the game with seven advisors, which makes the game a bit less confusing. During every American election year, players are not allowed to access their virtual screen starting at midnight on election night so that a panel of bureaucrats can analyze their progress. If their popularity and efficiency is good enough, the player is authorized to use the terminal for four more years. Not getting re-elected automatically means "game over."

Furthermore, if the player makes poor decisions or abuses their power, their advisors may resign, Congress will attempt to impeach them, foreign governments may overthrow them, or terrorist groups may attempt an assassination.

== Reception ==
Reception

Review score
Publication	Score
GameSpot	7.7/10

GameSpot currently has the game ranked at a 7.7/10 based on 13 reviews. Chuck Moss of Computer Gaming World in 1993 wrote that Shadow President was a good learning tool but that, "As a simulation, it has certain real-world problems [and] certain ... anomalies", such as Iraqi forces being much more powerful than they actually were at the time of the Gulf War. As a game, the magazine stated that "you can't do cool stuff" as the simulation "forces one to be more passive than active if stability is the desired goal", contrasting the game with "more fun" simulations like SimCity and Civilization. The magazine concluded that Shadow President was "a work of art that belongs in every civics classroom", but "even invading Canada is more fun". In a 1994 survey of wargames the magazine gave the title three-plus stars out of five, stating that "it has the 'highly educational' appendage, but that doesn't mean that it should be passed by".
