= Power Politics (video game) =

1992 video game

- Developer: Mindscape
- Publisher: Mindscape
- Release: 1992
- Genre: Government simulation game

Power Politics (game) is a Government simulation game published by Mindscape who obtained it from Will Vinton's Cineplay Interactive. Vinton was famous for Claymation featuring the California Raisins.

Version I featured the 1992 United States Presidential election.

Version II was re-branded as The Doonesbury Election Campaign, essentially the same game, but starring the characters from the Doonesbury comic strip.

Power Politics III (2004) featuring then current candidates, stronger graphics and online competitions.

The game simulated the real world so well that the Associated Press printed its "simulated" results predicting a victory by Bill Clinton in the 1992 elections. George Magazine ran a feature article on it in their premier edition.

While it is a worthwhile and challenging simulation for gamers, Power Politics also found its way into classrooms in over 400 colleges and universities, including George Washington University of Washington, D.C., as a tool for teaching the realities and complexities of political campaign management. The game won numerous awards for content, quality and creativity.

A player can campaign for one of thirty previous presidential candidates in an attempt to create an alternate history.

A player can create a political candidate with specified strengths and weaknesses, defining how liberal or conservative the candidate will be; select positions on the important issues; set the schedule; determine what type of advertising campaign will be run and how much to spend on it. Selecting a running mate is part of the game simulation.

Players can also do “what-if” scenarios just to test how candidates would have done against different opponents from different eras and political climates, rather than the one in which the candidate really lived. The historical cut-off is the 1960 campaign, the first in which television was an important factor. FDR vs JFK” or “Adlai Stevenson vs H. Ross Perot” would not work because FDR and Stevenson were candidates before 1960. Similarly pitting JFK against Lyndon Johnson would not work because they were from the same party. However a JFK vs Bob Dole or Jimmy Carter vs George HW Bush would work because they were real candidates, from 1960 and after.

== Development, Current Status ==
The game was developed by Randy Chase, who obtained all rights to the earlier versions and was planning to bring the game forward to apply to the 2008 presidential election, but died of heart failure and complications of diabetes at age 53.

== Reception ==
In a 1994 survey of wargames Computer Gaming World gave Power Politics two-plus stars out of five, criticizing the requirement that all historical candidates run in 1992 ("Quemoy and Matsu do not translate well into contemporary economic issues").
