= Hidden Agenda (1988 video game) =

- Developer: Trans Fiction Systems
- Publisher: Springboard Software
- Producer: Ron Martinez
- Designers: Gregory Guerin; Jim Gasperini; Ron Martinez
- Programmers: Ron Martinez; Bill Herdle
- Artist: Angela Greene
- Writer: Jim Gasperini
- Platforms: Classic Mac OS, MS-DOS
- Release: 1988
- Genre: Strategy
- Mode: Single-player

Hidden Agenda is a 1988 strategy video game intended to simulate the conditions of a post-revolutionary Central American country. The player takes the part of the newly elected president of the fictional country of Chimerica, which has recently been liberated from the rule of the corrupt dictator Farsante and his ruling clique. It is considered a forerunner of the Games for Change movement, alongside other early Macintosh games including Chris Crawford's Balance of Power.

== Gameplay ==
The game begins with a press conference where the new president is asked a series of questions which determine the social class the new administration is likely to favour.

The rest of the game consists in choosing whom to consult and making decisions based upon the proposals of advisors. In addition to cabinet ministers, the player may choose to consult the representatives of various groups, as well as study press reports and an almanac of national statistics.

The challenge of the game is to balance the interests and influences of conflicting factions within the country. Too many concessions to one side of a dispute can lead to the disenfranchised party seeking extra-political redress such as an insurrection. Overreliance on one faction can leave the government vulnerable to a coup d'état.

=== Economy ===
The economy of Chimerica is mainly based on two export crops, cotton and coffee. The cotton industry is mainly dominated by large landowners, whereas coffee fields are mainly held by small to medium-sized coffee growers. Most of Chimerica's food (primarily corn, flour, beans, and rice) is produced by campesinos.

Later on, with development aid, individual campesinos and farmers can receive help in producing vegetables for the American market along with utilising highly mechanized agricultural techniques. The development of the economy is up to the player, and can take the form of either a free market-oriented approach in which the player would receive support and aid from the United States, or a collectivist approach which is supported by the Soviet Union and Cuba.

=== Cabinet ===
Central to the game is the appointment of ministers to the player's cabinet. There are four positions that need to be filled, and ministers are chosen from the three main parties. The Agriculture Minister is perhaps the most important, being responsible for determining the extent of the much-demanded land reform policies, as well as being responsible for developing the country's struggling export commodities. The next most important is the defense minister, who implements policies concerning control of the Army. The Internal Affairs Minister decides upon budgetary policies such as infrastructure development and healthcare, and the External Affairs Minister manages Chimerica's diplomatic standing on the international stage.

Ministers effectively function as tools to implement the player's decisions, rather than to advise the player upon several courses of action. Players employ both the ministers and their party's ideals when they are appointed. When using the Consultation function, the player can choose from the courses of action recommended by any of their four ministers on any issue raised, for example allowing them to accept advice from the defence minister on agricultural policy, and so forth. However, it is impossible to make a decision outside of what the ministers advise. If an "interrupt" decision comes up, or an Encounter is initiated, there are only two courses of action available: that of the relevant minister, and that of the character who is being encountered. For example, if the player is being petitioned by an army general, the only options available will be those suggested by the defence minister and the general.

=== Political parties ===
The player may choose up to four ministers from the three political parties to fill their cabinet, from the "contacts" list. As each party only offers three candidates, note that the player cannot fill all ministerial roles unilaterally. The three political parties are:

- National Liberation Party: A left-wing party composed of Marxists, democratic socialists, poor farmers, industrial workers, and adherents of Liberation Theology. They usually promote closer ties and alignment with Cuba, the Soviet Union, and other socialist countries. The National Liberation Party promotes a socialist economy in addition to worker's cooperatives and emancipatory policies for Chimerica's marginalized minorities.
- Christian Reform Party: The only opposition party that was tolerated by Farsante. Members of the CRP are centre-left to centrist Christian democratic politicians with an established base among Chimerica's emerging urban middle class, intellectuals, and the Catholic Church, who often recommend a middle-of-the-road course of action. The party will offer the most moderate advice and are the most open to compromise, which may lead to them backing down if challenged on issues such as price controls. The Christian Reform Party advocates non-alignment in foreign affairs, expansion and protection of civil and political freedoms, and a well-regulated social market economy. It also is the party openly favored by the United States in the game.
- Popular Stability Party: As a right-wing nationalist party, the Popular Stability Party finds most of its support among landowners, the wealthy, the military, and religious conservatives, as well as poor "whose fortunes are tied to them". This party frequently sides with the United States and other capitalist nations in foreign affairs, and has close ties to a Farsantist death squad by the name of LIMPIA. Policies of the Popular Stability Party are often supportive of unfettered laissez faire capitalism and conservative stances on social issues.

== Development ==
Hidden Agenda's scenario was designed and written by Jim Gasperini, with input from project consultant Eric Ehrmann. While the scenario was implemented in text form, the game made use of an innovative graphical interface, with naturalistic characters, settings, and digital video interstitials. The narrative simulation system was designed and implemented by Greg Guerin and Ron Martinez (who also produced the game). Ron Martinez also designed and implemented the front end user experience, in the process inventing one of the first implementations of digital video with frames grabbed from a hacked four-head VCR.

== Reception ==
The game was reviewed in 1989 in Dragon #150 by Hartley, Patricia, and Kirk Lesser in "The Role of Computers" column. The reviewers gave the game 4 out of 5 stars. Computer Gaming World gave the game a positive review, calling the game a deep simulation. However, it was also noted parts of the game, especially the individuals, could get predictable after a few games. Compute! agreed on the simulation's depth but said that the characters "never became stale" despite not changing. The magazine reported several technical issues, however, including the inability to restore saves when playing the game from floppy disk. Chuck Moss was more negative, writing in Computer Gaming World in 1992 that Hidden Agenda reflected "extreme bias on the part of [its] designers ... [it] forced the game player to become a Sandinista to survive".

The Foreign Service Institute and University of Minnesota used Hidden Agenda to teach students, including United States Foreign Service officers assigned to Central America.

Macworld reviewed the Macintosh version of Hidden Agenda, praising its multifaced simulation of diplomatic strategy and resource management and "excellent" graphics. Macworld criticized the fact that you cannot create policy proposals of your own; they must be offered to you in a meeting, and the fact that "some proposals are made over and over again, even after you've accepted them."
