= Positech Games =

Video game developer based in the United Kingdom

- Type: Private
- Industry: Video games
- Founded: 1997 in UK
- Founder: Cliff Harris
- Products: Democracy; Production Line; Big Pharma; Gratuitous Space Battles; Kudos
- Website: www.positech.co.uk

Positech Games is a video game developer based in the United Kingdom. The company was founded in 1997 and belongs to the former Lionhead Studios programmer Cliff Harris. The company has published a number of PC games. One of the most notable publications by Positech is the strategy game of policy shift Democracy. Positech is known for making complex simulation games.

Harris has been, and remains, an outspoken critic of the labour practices of the principal of the games industry "triple A", particularly for its culture of long hours and lack of contact between developers and players. In August 2008, Harris wrote an entry on his blog aimed at "pirates" asking them why they used unlicensed games. The response was overwhelming, resulting in thousands of posts on sites like Facebook, Slashdot and Reddit. By way of response, Harris promised to reduce the prices of their games, not to use any DRM, and take care of the concerns of the responders on the weight of the demos and quality of gaming.

As well as developing games directly, Positech has also been involved in publishing a number of third party games, such as Redshirt, Big Pharma Political Animals and Shadowhand. In addition to publishing these titles, Positech has also invested along with other parties, in indie games including Duskers and A Night in the Woods.

Two days before the 2024 United Kingdom general election, Julian Benson, writing in The Guardian, took key features from the three main election manifestos and ran them through a Democracy 4 simulation. The overall picture that emerged, while not a projection, was far from encouraging.

== Games ==
- Asteroid Miner (also known as Star Miner)
- Battle Space 3001
- Big Pharma
- Democracy
- Democracy 2
- Democracy 3
- Democracy 3: Africa
- Democracy 4
- Gratuitous Space Battles
- Gratuitous Space Battles 2
- Gratuitous Tank Battles
- Kombat Kars
- Kudos
- Kudos: Rock Legend
- Kudos 2
- Minefield
- Oval Office: Commander in Chief
- Production Line
- Political Animals
- Redshirt (video game)
- Rocky Racers
- Saucer Attack
- Starship Tycoon (also known as StarLines Inc.)
- shadowhand

== See also ==
- Democracy video game
