= Subsim =

Online publication

- Website type: Entertainment
- Available in: English
- Founder: Neal Stevens
- Website: subsim.com
- Launched: Jan. 26, 1997
- Current status: Active

SUBSIM is an online publication founded by Neal Stevens in Jan. 1997 that focuses on naval and submarine computer game reviews, articles, and news. Subsim is short for Submarine simulator. Subsim's forums have been online since 1999, with archives back to 2001. Membership totals were 117,023 at August 2016, with approximately 7,700 active members daily. International meets have been held in London, Houston, Amsterdam, Copenhagen, Groton, Germany, and Tokyo.

Subsim is the media outlet for game publishers that feature naval content, a resource for military strategists, as well as a source of editorial comment on the state of PC computer simulations and games. Subsim members have been consultants and testers for game such as Enigma: Rising Tide, Silent Hunter II, Silent Hunter III, Dangerous Waters, Sub Command, Fleet Command, Destroyer Command, among others. Shortly after the release of the ill-fated Silent Hunter II, Ubisoft agreed to provide Subsim with the game source code to replace the rTime multiplayer engine with DirectPlay. Subsim members raised $10,000 to pay a programmer to make the improvements.

== Significant events ==
1998 - Subsim gets their first industry interview: Mike Jones of Aces of the Deep answers a series of questions about his groundbreaking U-boat sim. Also, the Subsim Fix My 688(I) Campaign begins, designed to urge EA/Sonalysts into producing a no-cheat patch for Jane's 688(I).

2002 - Subsim works with Ubisoft producer Carl Norman to initiate a broad reaching mod that will convert Silent Hunter II and Destroyer Command from the original MP engine (rTime) to Microsoft DirectPlay. The mod is deemed Projekt Messerwetzer (messerwetzer (ms-r-vt-zr-) n. [German] - A craftsman who sharpens old knives.) To avoid legal constraints, Projekt Messerwetzer is funded purely by donations and will be free to all. Subsim donates $1000 and Subsim players eventually raise $10,000 for the project. Multiplayer was significantly improved with this unofficial patch.

2003 - Subsim and Sub Club members meeting in London for the first Intercontinental Meeting.

2004 - Subsim Editor Neal Stevens attends the 2004 E3 convention in Los Angeles. First looks at Sid Meier's Pirates, Akella's PT Boats, and Ubisoft's Silent Hunter III reveal that 2005 will be a very good year for subsim players.

2006 - Neal Stevens of Subsim is invited aboard the new nuclear submarine USS Texas for a media tour. The Sept. 9 commissioning ceremony drew more than 10,000 guests and visitors to Galveston, including ship sponsor First Lady Laura Bush, Sens. Kay Bailey Hutchison and John Cornyn.

2007 - Subsim publishes the 2007 Submarine Almanac, celebrating 10 years on the web with a flotilla of stories, articles, and art from naval historians, subsim players, game developers, and Navy men. Foreword by Bestselling Author Joe Buff.

Abraham Zeegers of Netherlands, moderator and host of the 2005 Subsim meet, is found dead in his Amsterdam apartment, less than one week after he had testified at the Willem Holleeder trial. Dutch media discovered that although Abraham was a state witness in protective custody, he had a secret identity and was prominent in the Subsim forums.

2008 - Subsim's server is knocked offline by a transformer explosion and fire at The Planet Internet Services (ex. EV1 & Rackshack) Houston datacenter. At first, the Planet was able to restore power after two days but the datacenter's backup generator failed, and the website was down two more days.

2009 - Subsim hosts their fifth international meeting in Copenhagen, Denmark. Members shuttle to Kiel, Germany to tour U-995, the only remaining Type VII U-boat and conduct dives onboard Peter Madsen's 18.2m (approx.) homebuilt submarine, UC3 Nautilus.

2010 - Subsim breaks the 50,000 member mark. The annual April Fools' Day prank causes a furor.

2016 - Swedish submarine game HMS Marulken is picked up as Subsim's first game production: Wolfpack.

2019 - Subsim and Usurpator release Wolfpack on Steam.

2022 - Subsim celebrates 25 years on the web.
