= Submarine simulator =

Video game genre that focuses on the command of a submarine

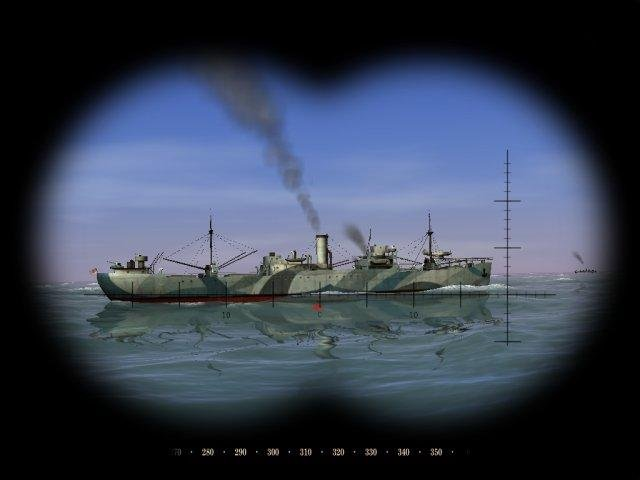
Periscope screenshot from the 2003 game Danger from the Deep

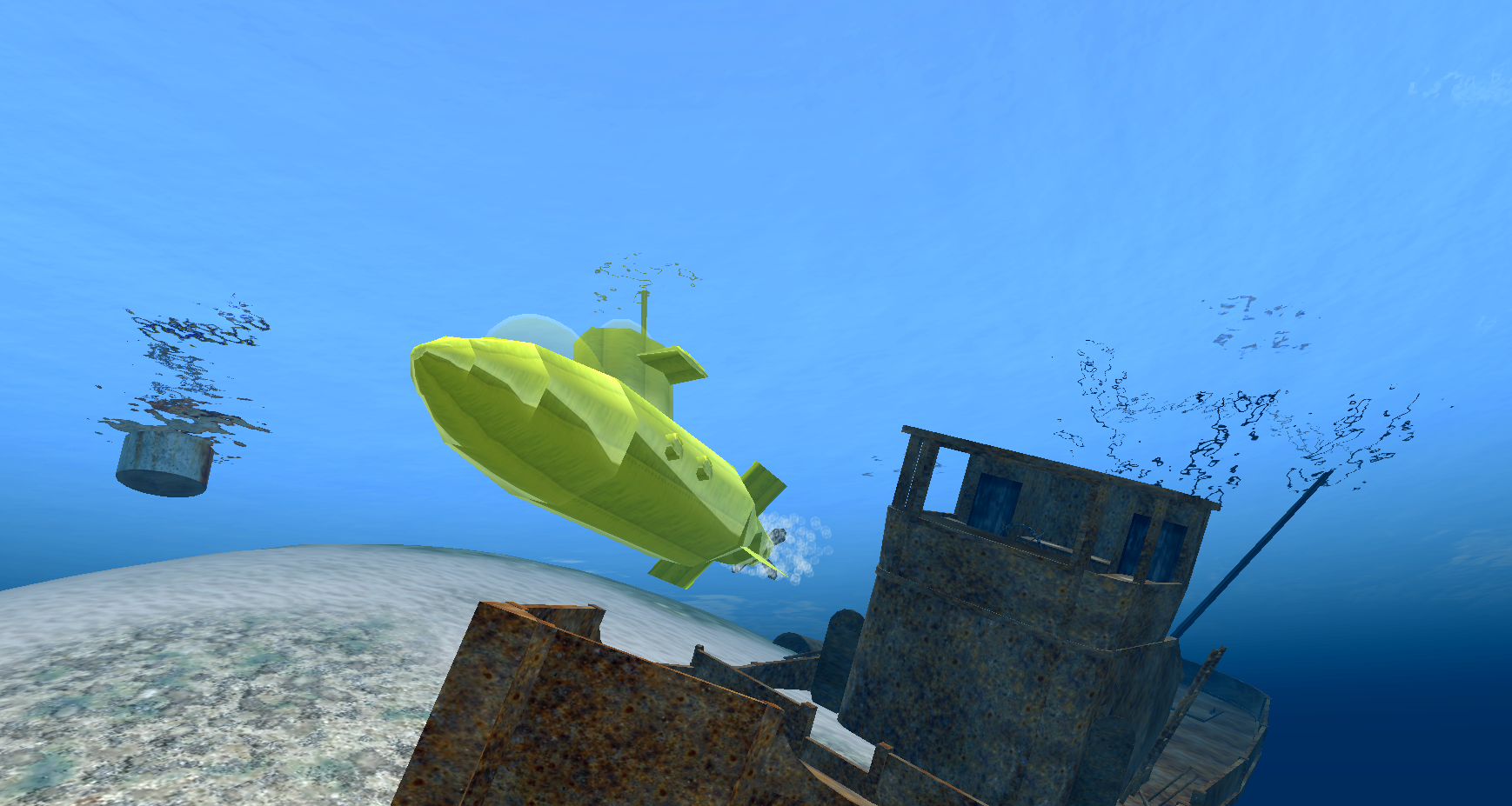
A submarine in Second Life

A submarine simulator is a video game in which the player commands a submarine. The usual form of the game is to go on a series of missions, each of which features a number of encounters where the goal is to sink surface ships and to survive counterattacks by destroyers. Submarine simulators are notable for the highly-variable pace of the game; it may take hours of simulated time to get into position to attack a well-defended convoy, and sub simulators typically include an option for players to adjust the ratio of real time to simulated time up and down as desired.

Most submarine simulators use World War II as the setting; its submarine warfare was lengthy and intense, the historical material is extensive, and the limited capabilities of the period's submarines place a high premium on game playing skill. Games usually feature either US submarines in the Pacific Ocean, or German U-boats in the Atlantic Ocean. Another popular category is modern attack submarines, especially those of the Los Angeles class also known as "688s" after the hull identification number of the first vessel of the class.

Game displays generally include an overhead map or "radar" view, showing the submarine and any ships whose position can be detected, the periscope view if the sub is close enough to the surface, a set of gauges showing depth and course, and a boat plan showing torpedo availability, damage to various subsystems and other in-game issues that may arise.

The first submarine simulator available to the civilian public was Thorn EMI's Submarine Commander of 1982.

== Titles ==
Name	Year	Setting
1914 Shells of Fury	2007	World War I
Battle Submarine	1995	
688 Attack Sub	1988	Cold War
688(I) Hunter/Killer	1997	
Aces of the Deep	1994	World War II
AquaNox series	1996–2020	Hypothetical future conflicts
Archimedean Dynasty	1996	Hypothetical 27th century conflict
Barotrauma	2023	Moon of Jupiter, distant future
Cold Waters	2017	World War III
Command: Aces of the Deep	1995	World War II
Dangerous Waters	2005	
Danger from the Deep	2003	World War II
Das Boot: German U-Boat Simulation	1990–91	World War II
Deadly Tide	1996	25th century alien invasion
Depthcharge	1977	
Deep Fighter: The Tsunami Offensive	2000	Fictional undersea nation
Dive to the Titanic	2010	Wreck of the RMS Titanic
Enigma: Rising Tide	2003/2005	Alternate history World War II
Fast Attack: High Tech Submarine Warfare	1996	
GATO	1984	Pacific Theatre (World War II)
Harpoon	1989	Cold War
The Hunt for Red October	1987–90	Cold War
Hunter Killer	1989	World War II
Iron Lung	2022	Fictional moon, distant future
Operation Neptune	1991	Fictional planet
Periscope	1966	
Radar Mission (Mode B)	1990	
Red Storm Rising	1988	World War III
Sea Wolf	1976	
Silent Depth: Submarine Simulation (Note: Known as Silent Depth: 3D Submarine Simulation on the PC)	2016	
Silent Depth 2: Pacific	TBA (Note: Early access version was released in 2024)	
Silent Service	1985	Pacific Theatre (World War II)
Silent Service II	1990	Pacific Theatre (World War II)
Silent Hunter	1996	Pacific Theatre (World War II)
Silent Hunter II	2001	Battle of the Atlantic (World War II)
Silent Hunter III	2005	Battle of the Atlantic (World War II)
Silent Hunter 4: Wolves of the Pacific	2007	Pacific Theatre (World War II)
Silent Hunter 5: Battle of the Atlantic	2010	Battle of the Atlantic (World War II)
Silent Steel	1995	
SSN-21 Seawolf	1994	Cold War
Steel Diver	2011	Fictional 20th century conflict
Submarine Commander	1982	World War II
Sub Battle Simulator	1987	World War II
Sub Command	2001	Cold War
Sub Culture	1997	Fictional undersea nation
Sub Hunt	1982	
Sub Mission	1986	
SubRoc-3D	1982	
Subwar 2050	1994	
Tom Clancy's SSN	1996	Fictional US-China conflict over the Spratly Islands
U-boat	1994	World War II
Uboat	2024	World War II
Up Periscope!	1986	
Under the Ice	1987	Cold War
Virtual Sailor	1999	
Wolfpack	1990	World War II

The adventure game Codename: ICEMAN (1989) by Sierra On-line contained a submarine simulator portion.

The vehicle simulator game Naval Ops: Warship Gunner 2 (2006) by Koei features submarine hulls & puts the player through several submarine piloting missions, though several other missions are also restricted against submarine use.

== AUV simulators ==
There are also a number of simulators available for underwater robots such as AUVs. These simulators are commonly used by research institutes for testing robot control and coordination algorithms before or during the development of a submarine. One of them is UWSim, the Underwater Simulator, which was developed in the IRSLab for marine robotics research and development. UWSim started with the RAUVI and TRIDENT research projects as a tool for testing and integrating perception and control algorithms before running them on the real robots and has continued its development until today.

== See also ==
- Maritime simulator
- Vehicle simulation game
