= Silent Hunter 5: Battle of the Atlantic =

2010 submarine simulator

- Developer: Ubisoft Bucharest
- Publisher: Ubisoft
- Producer: Alexandru Gris
- Designers: Dan Dimitrescu; George Alexandru Ilea; Mihnea Ilicevici; Ștefănel Adrian Ion; Andrei Istrate; Lucian Istrate; Stefan Net; Tudor Șerban
- Artist: Gabriel Barbu
- Writer: Jörg Ihle
- Composer: Jason Graves
- Series: Silent Hunter
- Platform: Microsoft Windows
- Release: NA: March 2, 2010; AU: March 4, 2010; EU: March 5, 2010; JP: April 30, 2010
- Genre: Submarine simulator
- Modes: Single-player, Multiplayer

Silent Hunter 5: Battle of the Atlantic is a submarine simulator for Microsoft Windows developed by Ubisoft Bucharest and published by Ubisoft. It is the fifth and latest installment of the Silent Hunter franchise and the successor of Silent Hunter 4: Wolves of the Pacific. Like Silent Hunter II and Silent Hunter III, it places the player in command of a German U-boat during World War II, more specifically the Battle of the Atlantic.

== Overview ==
Screenshot of a U-boat in Silent Hunter 5.

Silent Hunter 5 takes players behind the periscope of a German Type VII U-boat to take on the Allied Forces in battles across the Atlantic Ocean and Mediterranean Sea. Players command the U-boat after the first captain, Rahn, departs for another submarine. They assume the role of the next submarine captain from a first-person view in a campaign that spans 1939–1943.

== Reception ==
Reception

Aggregate score
Aggregator	Score
Metacritic	62/100

Review scores
Publication	Score
Eurogamer	5/10
GameSpot	5/10
GameZone	5/10
IGN	5.7/10
PC Format	81%
PC Gamer (UK)	77%
PC Gamer (US)	55%
PC PowerPlay	7/10
PC Zone	49%

The game received "mixed" reviews according to video game review aggregator Metacritic.

GameZone' Steven Hopper said, "The game offers some deep elements, but the overwhelming interface and steep learning curve make it very difficult to get into. The campaign missions are fairly low-key, with quick missions not really matching the depth of the gameplay. Many bugs and performance issues will also bog down your ability to enjoy the game."

GameSpot's Brett Todd said, "Silent Hunter 5 has promise, but this buggy and unstable game needs to be sent back to the drydock for some serious refitting."

3DJuegos' Álvaro Castellano Córdova said that "Silent Hunter 5 is the most accurate simulation of World War II submarine conflicts in the Atlantic. With more testing and less bugs this game could have been the best in the series", while PC Gamer UK criticized the bugs and DRM but said that without them, "it would be the best Silent Hunter yet."

== DRM ==
Silent Hunter 5: Battle of the Atlantic uses Ubisoft's Uplay for digital rights management. Initially Uplay required a constant connection to the internet for Silent Hunter 5 to run, halting the game if the connection was lost during gameplay. The scheme quickly came under fire after a denial-of-service attack on Ubisoft's DRM servers in early March, 2010, rendered Silent Hunter 5 and Assassin's Creed II unplayable for several days. The always-on requirement was quietly lifted towards the end of 2010, being changed to a single validation on game launch. Silent Hunter 5 was later made playable in Uplay's "offline mode" the following year, effectively eliminating the online requirement entirely.

== Germany recall ==
The Collectors Edition of the game has been recalled in Germany, after it was discovered that the publisher failed to remove a portion of Silent Hunter 5's World War II symbols, such as swastika flags which was not in accordance with German law. German law, until 2019, prohibited the distribution of video games with certain Nazi symbols such as swastikas and SS runes.
