= Under the Ice (disambiguation) =

Under the Ice is a 1987 video game.

Under the Ice may also refer to:

- "Under the Ice", a single by Topo & Roby, 1984
- "Under the Ice", a song by Blind Guardian from A Night at the Opera, 2002
- "Under the Ice", a song by the Drums from Abysmal Thoughts, 2017

== See also ==
- "Under Ice", a song by Kate Bush from Hounds of Love, 1985
