= Silent Hunter II =

2001 submarine simulator

- Developers: Aeon Electronic Entertainment; Ultimation Inc.
- Publisher: Ubi Soft
- Director: Troy Heere
- Writer: Guy Usario
- Composer: Kevin Manthei
- Platform: Windows
- Release: NA: November 6, 2001; EU: November 2001
- Genre: Submarine simulator
- Modes: Single-player, multiplayer

Silent Hunter II is a 2001 World War II U-boat combat simulation published by Ubi Soft for PCs with Windows 95/98/ME.

== Gameplay ==
The sound room of the U-boat

Silent Hunter II gives the player the command of German U-boats during the Battle of the Atlantic in World War II. The game offers single-player missions and multiplayer gameplay. The single-missions include sinking HMS Laurentic and HMS Patroclus as U-99, avoiding being sunk by HMS Fortune as U-44, sinking HMS Avenger as U-155, Operation Drumbeat against American shipping, retrieving the war diary from the German battleship Bismarck, the action in Tarrafal Bay, saving the German supply ship Python from HMS Dorsetshire (40) and attacking a task force as U-2511 as the last act of the Battle of the Atlantic.

The campaign, which has the player being sent notes from Admiral Dönitz, spans 21 missions from the start of the war in 1939 to the end of the war in 1945. It includes attacking fleeing Polish navy destroyers during the invasion of Poland, hunting British shipping off the English coast, penetration into Scapa Flow, assisting in the invasion of Norway, Blitzkrieg and Dunkirk evacuation ("Dunkirk little ship" Sundowner appears in this mission), then battling in the North Atlantic, before passing through the Strait of Gibraltar to La Spezia, severing the British lifeline to Malta, Operation Drumbeat, attacking in the Caribbean, attacking Arctic convoys, to the Allies ultimately gaining the upper hand in the Mid-Atlantic gap, repelling the D-Day invasion and finally escaping to Buenos Aires, Argentina at the end of the war, whereupon Dönitz sends a final message.

German war veteran and U-boat commander Erich Topp was one of the game's technical advisers, and a series of interviews with him appears in the game.

Silent Hunter II was developed with multi-player support as a notable feature. Players were able to connect with other players, and engage in sub vs. sub combat. Connectivity to the separate game Destroyer Command, also released by Ubisoft, was available, which enabled sub and surface ship combat.

== Development ==
Silent Hunter II was first announced in 1999, and originally developed by Aeon Electronic Entertainment, the developers of Silent Hunter, but they had to leave the project unfinished, and Ultimation Inc. finished it. It was originally scheduled to be released in May 2001, but was released in November 2001 after three years of work.

After release, instability with the multiplayer feature was found to be commonplace, yet Ubisoft never resolved this issue by releasing another official patch. While in 2002 Ubisoft had ended the official support, they authorized and enabled the game's community at Subsim.com to fix the game themselves by giving them the source code. The fan community raised over $7000 for an unofficial patch development project called Projekt Messerwetzer which ultimately fixed the issues. Since then, unofficial expansion packs like the World War II Pacific war theatre-based total conversation "Pacific Aces" were released by community.

In June 2009, after many years of commercial non-availability, the game was re-released on the digital distributor gog.com.

== Reception ==
Reception

Aggregate score
Aggregator	Score
Metacritic	71/100

Review scores
Publication	Score
Computer Gaming World	4/5
GameSpot	6.1/10
GameSpy	87%
GameZone	6/10
IGN	7.8/10
PC Gamer (UK)	61%
PC Gamer (US)	75%
PC Zone	67%

Silent Hunter II received "average" reviews according to video game review aggregator Metacritic. A Subsim review rated Silent Hunter II 80/100 in 2005 and named it "the new WWII subsim benchmark".

== See also ==
- Aces of the Deep, an unrelated U-boat game (1994)
- Silent Hunter (1996)
- Destroyer Command, naval simulation game (2002)
- Silent Hunter III (2005)
- Silent Hunter 4 (2007)
- Silent Hunter 5 (2010)
