= Subculture (disambiguation) =

A subculture is a group of people with a culture which differentiates them from the larger culture to which they belong.

Subculture may also refer to:

- Subculture (biology), a new cell or microbiological culture made by transferring some or all cells from a previous culture to fresh growth medium
- "Sub-culture" (song), a 1985 single by New Order
- Sub Culture, a 1997 computer game
