= 1914 Shells of Fury =

2007 video game

- Developer(s): Rondomedia h2f Informationssysteme
- Publisher(s): Strategy First
- Platform(s): Microsoft Windows
- Release: NA: August 14, 2007
- Genre(s): Submarine simulator
- Mode(s): Single-player

1914 Shells of Fury is a submarine simulation video game set during World War I. The game centers on commanding Kaiserliche Marine U-boats from the beginning of the War in 1914 to its end. It was developed by German studio h2f Informationssysteme and published by Strategy First in 2007.

== Reception ==
Critical reception for the PC version was mixed. The review aggregator website GameRankings gives the game a score of 46% out of 100%, basing its ranking on three other articles found about the game.

Subsim also reviewed the game, saying "Shells of Fury (SOF) has to be one of the strangest subsims released in quite a while. It takes on a neglected era (WWI), looks very retro, and appears to have been almost dumped on the market with no real ambition or pretensions."

The reviewer of GameZone said "I wanted this game to be what it looked like — a deeply enriching experience in a WWI sub, which has not been done before. I wanted it to be a version of Battleship — on steroids. It is, instead, a tentative little game without much depth."
