= Battle Submarine =

1995 video game

- Cover art
- Developer(s): Office Koukan
- Publisher(s): Pack-In-Video
- Composer(s): Masahiro Kusunoki
- Platform(s): Super Famicom
- Release: JP: December 22, 1995
- Genre(s): Submarine simulator
- Mode(s): Single-player

Battle Submarine (バトルサブマリン) is a submarine simulator video game, published by Pack-In-Video, which was released exclusively in Japan in 1995.
