= SSN-21 Seawolf =

1994 video game

- Developer: John W. Ratcliff
- Publisher: Electronic Arts
- Platform: MS-DOS
- Release: April 3, 1994
- Genre: Submarine simulator
- Modes: Single-player, multiplayer

SSN-21 Seawolf is a submarine simulator game designed by John W. Ratcliff and published for MS-DOS systems by Electronic Arts on April 3, 1994. A 3DO Interactive Multiplayer version was planned but never released.

The player takes command of a US Seawolf-class submarine and fights in 33 missions with targets under and above water including Russian attack submarines, destroyers, guided missile cruisers, aircraft carriers and frigates.

The game is a sequel to Electronic Arts' 688 Attack Sub, and has a similar mission structure and variety. Missions might require the player to defend friendly surface ships from attack, or sink those of the enemy. Other missions have their focus entirely underwater, with the player similarly either defending friendly submarines or hunting enemy missile and attack boats. While missions in Seawolf are pre-scripted, there are a number of initial setups which provides some variation in a mission's precise starting conditions.

The game's opponents include the Soviet Alfa-class, and Akula-class nuclear-powered attack submarines, which often guard Typhoon-class or Delta-class ballistic missile submarines. Some missions may pit the player against the quiet Kilo-class diesel-electric submarine.

Seawolf models the ocean environment, including thermal layers which can be used to deflect enemy sonar and hide the player's submarine. Sonar plays a central role in the game, and the player has access to the submarine's spectrographic 'waterfall' display which is used to detect and classify contacts. Additionally, the game includes marine life, such as whales and schools of fish, that could generate noise or reflect active sonar and create additional contacts.

Like its predecessor, Seawolf allows two players, on different PCs, to play each other via a modem, or null-modem cable, and adds the option of using an IPX local network which can provide a more reliable connection.

== Reception ==
Computer Gaming World in May 1994 said that "certain hard-core simulation features have been left out to enhance overall playability, but the state-of-the-art graphics, tremendous music by the Fat Man, and mind blowing sound effects all combine to lock this product dead-on-target". In June 1994 it criticized the game's unrealistic weapons load, "deficient" manual, "poor" AI, and lack of game balance, but said that "the game is still a whole heck of a lot of fun. This is definitely a game for someone who wants to enjoy a few hours of blowing up Russian ships, and not for the next Admiral Nimitz". The magazine concluded that "as a simulation, Seawolf is a dud; as a game, it's a solid effort and a worthwhile addition to any naval gamer's shelf".
