= Destroyer Command =

2002 naval simulation

- Developer: Ultimation Inc.
- Publisher: Ubisoft
- Producer: Mark Kudinger
- Platform: Microsoft Windows
- Release: NA: February 17, 2002; EU: 2002
- Genre: Vehicle simulation game
- Modes: Single-player, multiplayer

Destroyer Command is a naval simulation video game released by Ubisoft in 2002 and developed by the now-defunct Ultimation Inc.

== Gameplay ==
The game placed the player in command of a Destroyer during World War II, featuring campaigns from both the Pacific War and the Battle of the Atlantic. Customized missions can be played and players may select the opponent's forces and their own. Players can also have the chance to choose the difficulty rating in different games by adjusting the different realism ratings.

The game features two campaigns that include the entire Pacific and Atlantic warfare with 20 missions each. There are 20 predefined historical missions, for example, the Battle of Savo Island, additionally to some training missions, and automatically generated, customized missions. Classes of Destroyers that can be commanded by the player are Bagley, Benham, Benson, Clemson, Farragut, Fletcher, Gleaves, Gridley, Mahan, Porter, Somers, Sims, Allen M. Sumner, and the Wickes classes.

Weaponry that can be controlled by the player are the dual purpose 5-inch/38-caliber gun, the 4-inch/50-caliber gun, the light guns Bofors 40 mm gun and Oerlikon 20 mm cannon, 200 to 600 lb depth charges, and 21-inch torpedoes.

== Development ==
The game was developed by the Ultimation Inc. and released by Ubisoft in 2002. It was originally scheduled to be released in May 2001. Due to problems with the game, a patch was released on March 15, 2002, by the developer for download.

After release, instability with the multiplayer feature was found to be commonplace, yet Ubisoft never resolved this issue by releasing another official patch. While in 2002 Ubisoft had ended the official support, they authorized and enabled the game's community at Subsim to fix the game themselves by giving them the source code. The fan community raised over $7,000 for an unofficial patch development project called Projekt Messerwetzer which ultimately fixed the issues.

== Reception ==
Reception

Aggregate score
| Aggregator | Score |
|---|---|
| Metacritic | 51/100 |

Review scores
| Publication | Score |
|---|---|
| 4Players | 50% |
| AllGame | 1.5/5 stars |
| Computer Gaming World | 2/5 stars |
| EP Daily | 5/10 |
| GameSpot | 2.5/10 |
| GameZone | 8/10 |
| IGN | 5.6/10 |
| Jeuxvideo.com | 12/20 |
| Joystick | 45% |
| PC Gamer (US) | 79% |

Before the release of the patch, the game received "mixed" reviews according to Metacritic. It was nominated for the "Most Disappointing Game on PC" award at GameSpot's Best and Worst of 2002 Awards.

== See also ==
- Silent Hunter II, released in 2001.
