= Cold Waters (video game) =

2017 video game

- Developer: Killerfish Games
- Publisher: Killerfish Games
- Platforms: Microsoft Windows; MacOS
- Release: 5 July 2017
- Genre: Submarine simulator
- Mode: Single-player

Cold Waters is a 2017 submarine simulation video game developed and published by Killerfish Games.

It is a "spiritual successor" to the 1988 submarine simulation video game Red Storm Rising by MicroProse.

The game sees the player take the command of a US submarine in 1968, 1984 or 2000 during a hypothetical World War III facing off against either the Soviet Union or the People's Republic of China with the player being tasked with completing different missions to accomplish while avoiding being destroyed.
