= Red Storm Rising (video game) =

1988 video game

- Atari ST cover
- Developer: MicroProse
- Publisher: MicroProse
- Designers: Sid Meier; Arnold Hendrick
- Composer: Ken Lagace
- Platforms: Amiga, Atari ST, Commodore 64, MS-DOS, PC-98
- Release: 1988
- Genre: Submarine simulator
- Mode: Single-player

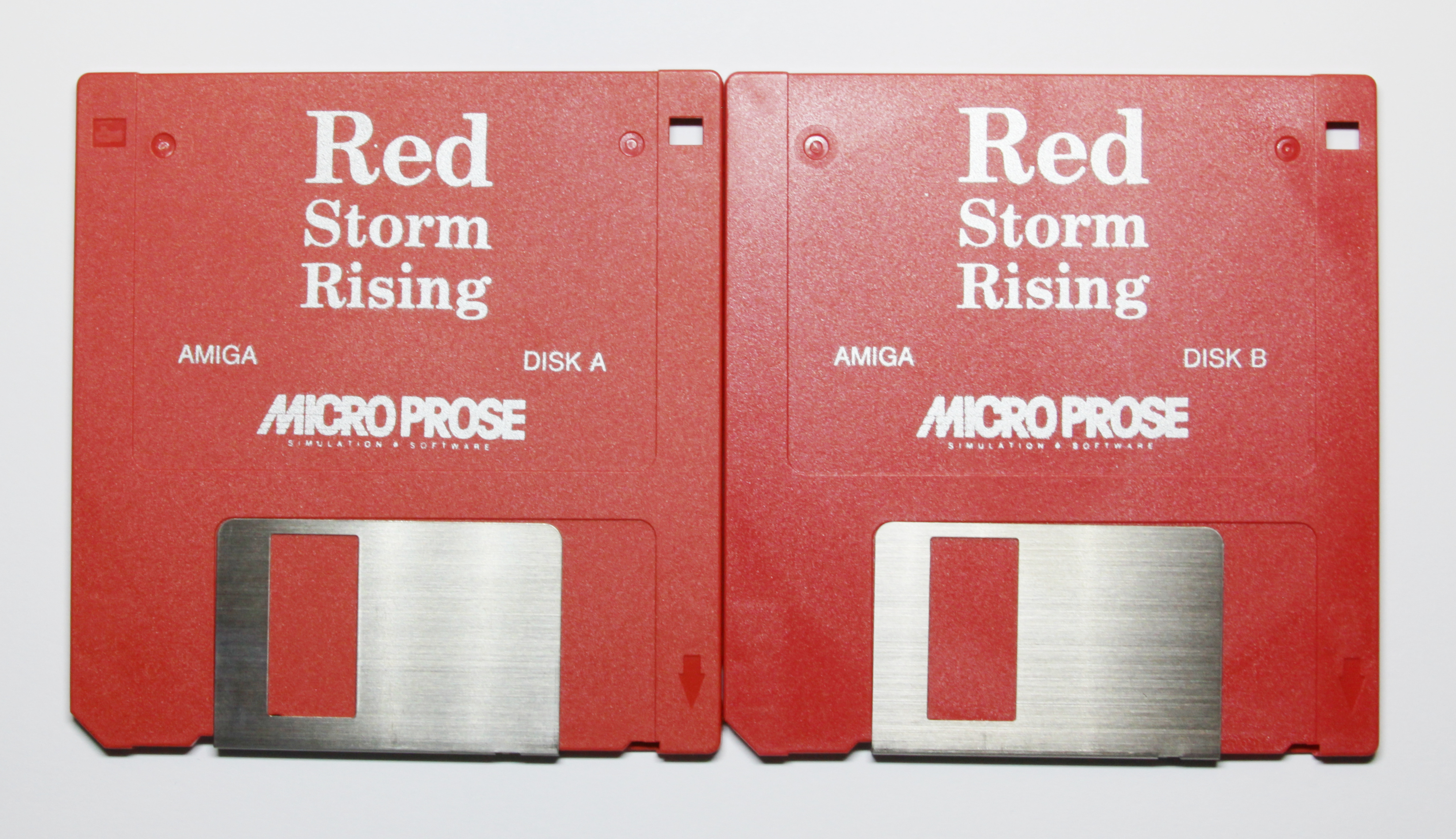
Amiga floppy disks

Red Storm Rising is a submarine simulator video game published by MicroProse in 1988 for the Commodore 64. It was co-designed and co-programmed by Sid Meier. Versions followed for Amiga, Atari ST, MS-DOS, and PC-98. Based on Tom Clancy's 1986 novel Red Storm Rising, the player is in charge of an American SSN submarine in the Norwegian Sea Theater in the global conflict described in the book.

== Plot ==
As with USS Chicago in the book, the game concentrates on the Norwegian Sea theater, placing the player as captain of a single United States Navy nuclear-powered submarine tasked to disrupt Soviet forces in the area between the Kola Peninsula and the Greenland-Iceland-UK barrier. Missions may include interdiction of tanker fleets, stopping amphibious landing forces, eliminating Soviet wolf pack submarines and many others. The background story remains true to the book's plot but the final mission is always to prevent the Soviets from launching nuclear missiles by locating and eliminating their ballistic missile submarines.

== Gameplay ==
The player may choose from four different timelines. Starting in the early 1980s limits the player to Permit, Sturgeon or early Los Angeles-class submarines, but the Soviets have weak sonar, whereas starting in the late 1980s allows the player to use the improved Los Angeles class and even the newer Seawolf subs. Weapons improve accordingly, with Tomahawk missiles and improved Mark 48 torpedoes included in later timelines but the Soviets begin deploying nuclear-powered aircraft carriers and much better anti-submarine warfare ships.

The goal of the game is always consistent: inflicting as much damage as possible on the Soviets in the Norwegian Sea, thus allowing safe passage to supply convoys coming from America and preventing amphibious forces from conquering Norway and Iceland. In order to make contact with enemy forces, the player must navigate the sub in a map of the North Sea, depending on his sub's sensors as well as allied aircraft, satellites and SOSUS arrays to detect the Soviet forces.

Success or failure of the missions impacts the progress of the war depicted by shifts in the front line on a simple map of Europe. If the player fails in a mission then Soviet forces capture more territory, but if the player succeeds then NATO is able to resist the Soviet attacks. In the course of the campaign the player can gain rank and possibly earn medals as well. In the end of the war, a final score is calculated and the player is awarded a post-war rank if NATO wins the war; this rank can vary from commander to admiral depending on how successful they have been in their missions. A poor performance in the game, particularly in the final mission, means that the Soviets win the war and the player ends up with the rank of Tovarishch (comrade), becoming a political prisoner in a communist-ruled America.

== Reception ==
Compute! called Red Storm Rising a "must" for fans of Tom Clancy or military simulations. Computer Gaming World in 1988 and 1992 gave the game four and a half stars out of five, commending it for balancing realism and gameplay while noting deviations from realism, such as the durability of the player's submarine. The reviewer noted the game is "relatively easy to learn and win. This reviewer does not mean that the challenge is absent, but while the challenge is omnipresent, it is surmountable". In a 1994 survey of wargames the magazine gave the title three-plus stars out of five, stating that it was "one of the best on the market". In 1996, the magazine ranked Red Storm Rising as the 39th best PC game of all time, calling it "a modern submarine combat game unmatched even by today's offerings, the play balance of scenarios, campaigns and realism was near perfect".

Cold Waters, a "spiritual successor" to Red Storm Rising, was released in 2017.
