= 688 Attack Sub =

1989 video game

- Genesis box art
- Developers: Electronic Arts (MS-DOS); MicroProse (Genesis)
- Publishers: Electronic Arts (MS-DOS); Sega (Genesis)
- Designers: John W. Ratcliff; Paul Grace
- Programmer: Ed Fletcher (Genesis)
- Composers: Rob Hubbard; David Javelosa (Genesis)
- Platforms: MS-DOS, Amiga, PC-98, Genesis
- Release: MS-DOS: NA: 1989; Amiga: EU: 1990; Genesis: NA: 1991; EU: September 1991
- Genre: Submarine simulator
- Modes: Single-player, multiplayer

688 Attack Sub is a submarine simulator video game designed by John W. Ratcliff and Paul Grace and published in 1989 for MS-DOS and in 1990 for Amiga by Electronic Arts. A Sega Genesis version developed by MicroProse was released in 1991 by Sega.

The player takes command of a US Los Angeles-class or Soviet Alfa-class nuclear-powered attack submarine, and plays ten missions ranging from Cold War scenarios to combat missions in a hypothetical global conflict. As modeled in the game, the American submarine has more sophisticated electronics and more weapons. The Soviet boat has fewer weapons but higher sustained speeds. Two people can play against each other over a modem (or null modem cable).

Ratcliff and Grace later developed SSN-21 Seawolf, published in 1994.

== Reception ==
Genesis version

Computer Gaming World in 1989 gave the IBM PC compatible version a positive review, noting the game was designed to be a fun game, as opposed to a realistic simulator, and concluding that it was "this reviewer's personal candidate for 'Game of the Year'". 1992 and 1994 surveys in the magazine of wargames with modern settings gave the game two stars out of five, stating that the game was closer to World War II than modern submarine operations, and criticizing the "unrealistic" emphasis on periscope target acquisition. Compute! included the game in its list of "nine great games for 1989", describing it as "swift and exciting as any Mach 2 flight simulator". The magazine praised the game's graphics and two-player modem option, but criticized the lack of more than ten missions.

Mike Siggins reviewed 688 Attack Sub for Games International magazine, and gave it a rating of 7 out of 10, and wrote that "the appeal of using modern weapons soon wears off and one is left with only the different situations to add spice. Overall though, it is a good game on an unusual topic but would benefit from a second edition".
