= The Hunt for Red October (1987 video game) =

- Spectrum cover art
- Developer: Oxford Digital Enterprises
- Publisher: Argus Press Software
- Programmers: Commodore 64; Jef Gamon; Amiga; Richard T. Horrocks
- Artist: Jason Kingsley
- Platforms: Amiga, Amstrad CPC, Apple II, Macintosh, Apple IIGS, Atari ST, Commodore 64, MS-DOS, ZX Spectrum, MSX
- Release: NA: 1987; Apple IIGS: 1989
- Genre: Submarine simulator
- Mode: Single-player

The Hunt for Red October is a video game based on the 1984 book The Hunt for Red October by Tom Clancy. It was released in 1987 and was available for the Atari ST, Amiga, Apple II, Macintosh, ZX Spectrum, MSX, Commodore 64, and IBM PC. A port for the Apple IIGS was released in 1989. The game is a combination of a submarine simulator and strategy. The player navigates the Red October towards U.S. waters while avoiding the Soviet Navy.

== Gameplay ==
The game's interface is fully mouse driven, with the red hammer and sickle serving as a pointer (Atari ST screenshot)

In The Hunt For Red October, the player is a Russian submarine commander defecting to the West. The submarine is equipped with a silent caterpillar drive. The mission has two parts: escape and rendezvous. Escaping involves navigating obstacles and avoiding Russian submarines. The difficulty of rendezvous depends on the player's performance in the first section.

The playing screen is divided into two areas: the top shows maps, sonar projections, and a periscope viewpoint, while the bottom displays icons, messages, and gauges to control the ship. The game is mouse-driven, with control split between sonar, engines, weapons, and periscope.

Options include saving/loading positions and accessing a recognition chart for enemy craft. Pressing FI accesses these options and pauses the game. If the sub is destroyed or hits an obstacle, a newspaper-style report rates the player's performance.

== Reception ==
Computer Gaming World in 1988 described it as an excellent submarine simulator, controlled entirely by mouse. The replay value of the game was also praised, as the Soviets change tactics with each game. A 1992 survey in the magazine of wargames with modern settings was much more negative, giving the game one and a half stars out of five and stating that it "probably did more to turn off purchasers to the wargame genre than any other product". Antic recommended the ST version of the Hunt for Red October to fans of the novel or submarine games. The Palm Beach Post criticized the game as too difficult, not providing the player with information needed to win.

== See also ==
- The Hunt for Red October, 1990 film
