= Deep Fighter =

2000 video game

- European Dreamcast cover art
- Developer: Criterion Games
- Publisher: Ubi Soft
- Platforms: Dreamcast, Windows
- Release: Dreamcast: NA: August 23, 2000; EU: September 22, 2000; Windows: EU: September 29, 2000
- Genre: Submarine simulator
- Mode: Single-player

Deep Fighter (full title: Deep Fighter: The Tsunami Offense) is a submarine simulator video game developed by Criterion Games and published by Ubi Soft. It was released for Dreamcast and Windows in 2000. The game has the player dog-fight enemies underwater whilst completing missions. The game contains cutscenes featuring actors, including David Walliams.

== Plot ==
A spiritual sequel to the 1997 game Sub Culture, it is set in a war-torn community hidden beneath the sea. The race living there is human in appearance and possesses advanced technology, but are so minuscule that even regular marine life poses a dangerous threat. The ultimate goal is to construct a Leviathan Mother Ship to transport the entire society to safety, while fighting against a hostile faction known as the Shadowkin.

== Gameplay ==
The player is a private who controls a fighter-type submarine in the civilization's defense force. Primarily playing from a first-person perspective, they must accomplish missions that unlock more powerful subs and weapons. In addition to combat, some missions are more varied, such as breeding fish, activating perimeter defenses and racing the player's wingmen. There are eight bosses in the game, which are often based on giant sea life.

== Reception ==
Reception

Aggregate scores
Aggregator	Score	
Aggregator	Dreamcast	PC
GameRankings	69%	73%
Metacritic	69/100	N/A

Review scores
Publication	Score	
Publication	Dreamcast	PC
CNET Gamecenter	7/10	N/A
Consoles +	84%	N/A
Electronic Gaming Monthly	7.5/10	N/A
EP Daily	7.5/10	N/A
Game Informer	6.75/10	N/A
GameRevolution	C	N/A
GameSpot	8.1/10	N/A
GameSpy	5/10	N/A
IGN	8.2/10	N/A
Jeuxvideo.com	14/20	14/20
Next Generation	1/5	N/A
PC Zone	N/A	53%

The Dreamcast version of Deep Fighter received "average" reviews according to the review aggregation website Metacritic. Garrett Kenyon of NextGen's early review called it "A boring drag of a game that will surely lull you to sleep if you manage to keep from killing yourself first." Electronic Gaming Monthly and Game Informer gave it positive to average reviews while it was still in development.
