= Danger from the Deep =

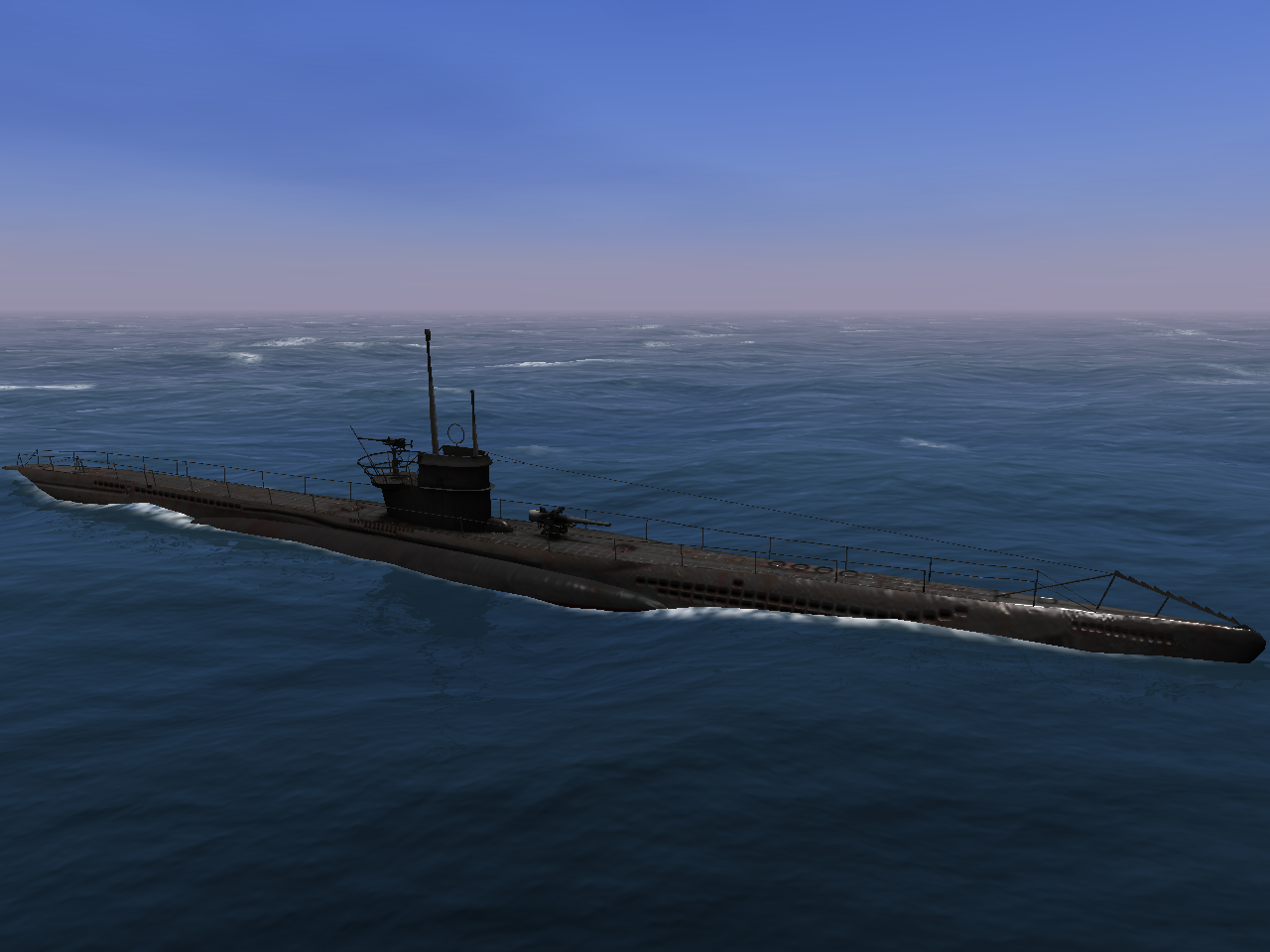
- Platforms: Linux, FreeBSD, OpenBSD, and Microsoft Windows
- Release: 2003
- Genre: Submarine simulator
- Modes: Single-player, IPv6 and IPv4 Multiplayer planned

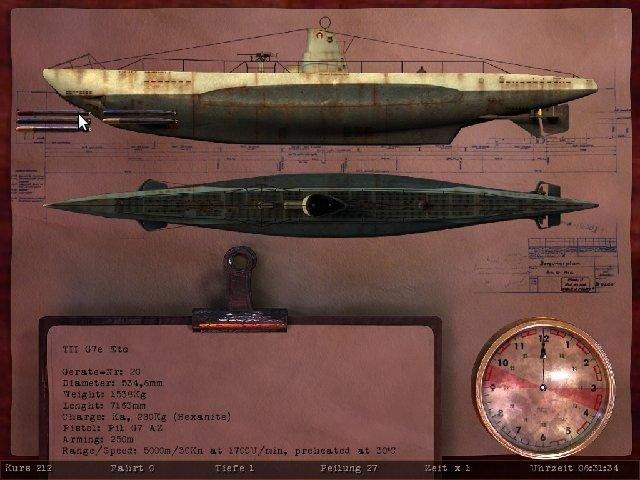
Screenshot

Danger from the Deep, often abbreviated as DftD, is an open-source World War II German U-boat simulation for PC, striving for technical and historical accuracy.

== Development ==
The project was registered in 2003 on sourceforge.net and is since then developed as open source software under the GPLv2. In 2004 it reached beta status.

The game targets Multi-platform, supporting FreeBSD, OpenBSD, Mac OS X, Linux distributions, and Microsoft Windows by utilizing SDL and OpenGL. Hardware addressed is OpenGL 1.5 (while recommending "OpenGL 2.0 or greater") with around 256 MB of RAM, 1 GHz processor and common PC input devices (keyboard, mouse).

Development is intermittent. The latest commit to the Git repo was August 3, 2023. The last downloadable release was May 8, 2010

== Reception ==
A Linux Journal review from 2010 received DftD quite positive.

In 2004 The Wargamer recommended the game to "serious sim gamers" which should "head over to Danger from the Deep's official web site and take a look.". In 2011 an Ars Technica article on the history of simulation games noted Danger from the Deep as: "These days, submarine sims [...] are kept alive by the open-source Danger from the Deep".

The game was downloaded between 2003 and April 2017 1.3 million times alone from SourceForge, chip.de counted another 100,000 downloads.
