= Dangerous Waters (video game) =

2005 video game

- North American boxart
- Developer: Sonalysts Combat Simulations
- Publisher: Strategy First
- Platform: Microsoft Windows
- Release: NA: February 22, 2005 (Online); NA: December 20, 2005; NA: February 7, 2006 (Steam); EU: May 26, 2006
- Genre: Naval simulator
- Modes: Single-player, multiplayer

Dangerous Waters, also known as S.C.S. Dangerous Waters, is a 2005 naval warfare simulation game developed by American studio Sonalysts Combat Simulations. It was released for Microsoft Windows in 2005, and on Steam on February 7, 2006.

== Gameplay ==
Dangerous Waters is a naval warfare simulation game which features many player-controllable units deployed in the armed forces of 18 different countries. Campaign mode allows a player to control forces as the United States Navy, Russian Federation Navy, or People's Liberation Army Navy of China. Players can perform multiple station roles such as radar and sonar, required to complete missions manually, or have those stations played in AI mode with simulated crew members manning non-command functions.

The multi-player mode allows multiple players to occupy individual crew stations on the same vessel, i.e. to control the same vessel together.

Players can control the Los Angeles-class submarine, the Seawolf-class submarine, the MH-60 Helicopter, the P-3 Orion plane, the Oliver Hazard Perry-class frigate, the Akula-class submarine, and the Kilo-class submarine. Some controllable assets are available in different versions.

Dangerous Waters allows the player to create scenarios using an included mission editor which includes a scripting language. Dangerous Waters can use and import scenario scripts from these other games: 688(I) Hunter/Killer, Sub Command, and Fleet Command.

In 2009, a community-made mod titled Reinforce Alert was released, which added new playable naval, surface, and air units to the game.

== Release ==
The game was initially not sold in stores, and was only available through the website Battlefront.com. In December 2005, Dangerous Waters was made available at retail stores by publisher Strategy First. Dangerous Waters was released on Steam content delivery system in February 2006.

Dangerous Waters was published in Europe by BlackBean Games and was in UK stores on May 26, 2006. It included exclusive European content on a second DVD (also available on the company's website). A 90-page printed manual was included in the box (consisting of the first four sections of the 570 page manual, plus appendices), with the full manual as a PDF file.

== Reception ==
Reception

Aggregate score
Aggregator	Score
Metacritic	82/100

Review scores
Publication	Score
Computer Gaming World	4/5
GameSpot	8.3/10
GameSpy	4/5
GameZone	8.8/10
IGN	8.4/10
PC Format	84%
PC Gamer (UK)	82%
PC Gamer (US)	85%
PC Zone	73%
X-Play	3/5

The game received "favorable" reviews according to video game review aggregator Metacritic.
