= Sub Culture =

1997 video game

- Box cover art for Sub Culture
- Developer: Criterion Games
- Publisher: Ubi Soft
- Platform: Microsoft Windows
- Release: WW: November 11, 1997
- Genre: Submarine simulator
- Mode: Single-player

Sub Culture is a submarine action-adventure video game, developed by Criterion Games and published by Ubi Soft. It was released in November 11,1997, and was often praised as a solid title, but received little recognition and had only limited sales. A spiritual successor, also developed by Criterion and published by Ubi Soft, was released in 2000 under the name Deep Fighter.

== Gameplay ==
The gameplay is rather straightforward, placing the emphasis on buying and trading goods found in the environment for weapon, shield, and utility upgrades. There are also missions available, which depict some of the turmoil between the Bohine, Procha, and the Pirates. By accepting missions for different cities, the player can unlock new technologies, equipment, and is given discounts for certain goods.

== Plot ==
In the opening sequence of the game, a soup can discarded from a boat smashes the home of a race of tiny submarine humanoids. The player takes the role of the survivor of this disaster, a freelance sub captain who must buy, sell, trade, and pirate his way to the top in a cutthroat world of underwater adventure. The Bohines, a nation in the game, are at war with the Prochas, another nation.

To survive and prosper, the player character can engage in various mining or salvage operations, recovering enormous bottle caps, cigarette butts, thorium crystals, and pearls, all of which are valuable commodities sellable in cities. However, both mutant fish and pirate subs lie in wait. Once the player has built up enough cash, they can begin to exploit a form of 'stock market' in which various commodities can be purchased and resold at other locations or times for higher prices.

The player can also take on various missions for either of the two warring nations. These missions become progressively more difficult, ranging from dropping depth charges down the air vents of an underground base to attacking nuclear-powered torpedo-firing walking tanks. Eventually the two nations come to terms in order to meet and defeat their mutual foe, the Pirates. The final mission consists of an all-out assault by both nations against the concealed Pirate city, with the player shooting their way through heavily guarded tunnels to plant a bomb next to the city.

== Reception ==
Next Generation rated it four stars out of five, and stated that "All in all, Sub Culture creates a compelling world, and if the thought of undersea exploration and adventure appeals to you, this game is probably the best of its kind." Newsweek praised the 3D graphics and "breathtaking underwater environments", stating that it was "a winner for teens and adults". Sub Culture was the runner-up for GameSpot's 1997 "Most Original Game" award, which ultimately went to Dungeon Keeper.

Sub Culture was a commercial failure. In the United States, its sales totaled 11,083 units by April 1999. Analyzing its performance, Ubisoft's Tammy Schachter wrote that "the 3D was beautiful, the gameplay was top of the line, and all of the marketing was in place... so perhaps this is a niche game genre that then appealed to only a small segment of the hard-core gaming community."

== See also ==
- List of underwater science fiction works
