= Unofficial patch =

Software update created by a third party

An unofficial patch, a.k.a. community patch and fan patch, is a software update created by a third party, such as a user community, without the involvement of whoever is considered the official maintainer of the software (i.e. original developer). An unofficial patch generally does not change the intended use of the software, in contrast to other third-party adaptions such as mods or cracks.

An unofficial patch is typically intended to repair bugs and provide new capabilities such as support for newer operating systems, increased display resolutions and new display formats. While unofficial patches are most common for the PC platform, they can also be found for console games e.g. in context of the emulation community.

A fan translation is an unofficial patch that adds natural language support to software. Fan translations are most common for Japanese role-playing games which are often not localized for Western markets.

A slipstream like patch combines multiple official patches into one unofficial update package as a convenience to users when individual patches are only available online or as small incremental updates.

A common motivation for creating an unofficial patch is lack of technical support from the official maintainer which may result from:

- The software reached the maintainer's defined end-of-life
- The software was superseded by a successor product
- The software was originally designed to operate in a substantially different environment and may require improvement/optimization
- The maintainer went out of business
- Support is not economically viable (e.g. localization for small markets)
- A fast solution for a time critical problem (e.g. security holes) when an official one takes too long
- The official maintainer is unable to cope with the problems

== Methods ==
The most common case is that the source code and the original development tools are not available for the software. Therefore, the faulty software's binary must be analyzed at run time by reverse engineering and debugging. If the problem is found, a fix to the program must be applied. Sometimes only small changes in configuration files or the registry are required, sometimes binary hacks on the executable itself are required to fix bugs. If a software development kit (e.g. for modding) is available, fixes to the content can be easily produced, otherwise the community would need to create their own tools. These found fixes are typically packed to user deployable patches (e.g. with NSIS, Innosetup).

If the source code is available, support can by provided most effectively. Sometimes the source code is released intentionally, sometimes by leaking or mistake, such as what happened with the game engine of the Thief series. Sometimes fans even completely reverse-engineer source code from the original program binary. With the source code available even the support of completely different but recent platforms with source ports becomes possible.

== Law ==
While no court cases have directly addressed the legal ramifications of unofficial patches, similar cases have been tried on related issues. The case of Galoob v. Nintendo found that it was not copyright infringement by a user to apply an unauthorized patch to a system (while the scope was very specific to the Game Genie). On the other hand, the case Micro Star v. FormGen Inc. found that user-generated maps were derivative works of the original game. In Sega v. Accolade, the 9th Circuit held that making copies in the course of reverse engineering is a fair use, when it is the only way to get access to the "ideas and functional elements" in the copyrighted code, and when "there is a legitimate reason for seeking such access". According to Copyright law of the United States 17 U.S. Code § 117, the owner of a copy of a program can modify it as necessary for "Maintenance or Repair", without permission from the copyright holder; an argumentation also raised by Daniel J. Bernstein professor at the University of Illinois at Chicago.

Similar user rights are given also according to European copyright laws. The question of whether unauthorized changes of lawfully obtained copyright-protected software qualify as fair use is an unsettled area of law. An article of Helbraun law firm remarks, in the context of fan translations, that while redistributing complete games with adaptions most likely does not fall under fair use, distributing the modifications as a patch might be legally permissible; however, that conclusion has not been tested in court.

== Reception ==
Reception of unofficial patches is mixed, but by large, copyright holders are ambivalent. When the software is not considered commercially viable unofficial patches are ignored by the copyright holder as it is not seen as a source of lost revenue. There have been seldom cases of cease and desist letters to unofficial patch and fan translation projects.

Sometimes the copyright holder actively support the patching and fixing efforts of a software community, sometimes even by releasing the source code under a software license which allows the software community the continued software support by themselves. Examples for such software are in the List of commercial video games with later released source code.

The free and open source software movement was founded in the 1980s to solve the underlying problem of unofficial patches, the limited possibility for user self-support in binary only distributed software due to missing source code. Free and open source software demands from distributed software the availability of source code, which prevents the technical problems and legal uncertainties of binary only user patching of proprietary software.

== Examples in video games ==
Computer game	Type
Anachronox	Bug fix patch
Age of Empires: The Rise of Rome	Bug fixes, balance fixes, stability fixes, UI and sound improvements, resolution fixes including support for more higher definition resolutions
Arcanum: Of Steamworks and Magick Obscura	Bug fix patch, fan translation
Battlezone II	Bug fix patch
Civilization IV	Bug fixes and extensions, (with SDK source code and accessible XML configuration and Python files)
Civilization V	Bug fixes and extensions (based on source code)
Chrono Trigger	Fan translation, bug fix patch
Command & Conquer	Bug fix patch, resolution fixes, added support for language packs
Dark Souls II	Bug fixes
Deadly Premonition: The Director's Cut	Resolution fix
Ecco the Dolphin	Bug fixes, ports for newer OSes
The Elder Scrolls II: Daggerfall	Bug fix patch, fan translation
The Elder Scrolls V: Skyrim	Bug fix patch, translation fixes
Empire Earth 2	Bug fixes, unhandled exception crash fixes, Windows 8 / 10 / 11 support, more screen resolutions (including 4k and the custom screen resolution generator), DirectX 9 support, G-Sync / FreeSync and high monitor refresh rate fixes, unlimited camera zoom settings, changed low-quality sounds, new options in game (e.g. more population, cycle time of day, disable crowns system and leaders), integrated language changer, integrated private multiplayer server and many more new features (fully customizable), frequently updated.
E.T. the Extra-Terrestrial	Bug fixes
Fallout 2	Bug fixes, resolution fixes
Fallout: New Vegas	Bug fixes, stability and performance fixes (especially for modern systems)
Fallout 4	Bug fixes
Freelancer	Bug fix patch
Grand Theft Auto: San Andreas	Engine, graphics and quality-of-life fixes
Gothic 3	Bug fix patch
Infinity Engine (Baldur's Gate series, Icewind Dale etc.)	Bug fix patch, resolution fixes
IL-2 Sturmovik: Cliffs of Dover	Fix mod based on source code (which later became an official release as "Blitz Edition")
Jagged Alliance 2 (now JA2-Stracciatella)	Bug fix patch, resolution fixes, ports
Jazz Jackrabbit 2	Bug fixes, stability fixes, new features for client side and server side
Legacy of Kain series	Bug fix patch
LucasArts adventures (Monkey Island, Indiana Jones, etc.)	Fan translation
Master of Magic	Fan patch
Master of Orion 3	Fan translation, bug fix
Minecraft	Fan fixes implemented to latest patches
MVP Baseball 2005	Fixes, support continuation
Nier: Automata	Resolution fixes, performance fix
Nuclear Throne	Various bug-fixes for co-op mode, as well as addition of online co-op
Paradroid	Bug fixes, speed fixes
Rollcage	Bug fix patch
Silent Hill 2	'Enhanced Edition' rehaul, including bug fixes, enhanced and remade graphic assets, full widescreen support, HD cutscenes, and numerous modern improvements
Silent Hunter II / Destroyer Command	Bug fix patch (Ubisoft endorsed with source code)
Star Ocean	Fan translation
Star Wars: Knights of the Old Republic II – The Sith Lords	Bug fixes, restored content, widescreen support
Supreme Commander	Bug fixes, multiplayer client and server replacement (Server emulator)
Dark Engine (Thief 1, Thief 2, System Shock 2)	Bug fix patch
Titan Quest	Bug fix patch
Ultima series	Bug fix patch, fan translation
Ultima 4	Bug fix patch, remaster
Vampire: The Masquerade – Bloodlines	Bug fix patch, restored content, widescreen and modern OS support
Xenonauts	Bug fix patch and support continuation

== Examples in general software ==
Software	Type
3dfx drivers	Driver fixes, continued support
Adobe Acrobat	Fast security fix
Socket 7 boards' Award BIOS	32 GB+ HDD support, AMD K6-2/3+ support
iOS 4.3.3	Fast security fix
Java	Fast security fix
Windows 7, Windows 8	Unlocking of hardware support
Windows 98	Slipstream patch, Bug fix patch, support for harddrives > 137 GB, support for 2k API
Windows XP	Update pack
Internet Explorer	Fast security fix
Nvidia nForce Chipset Device driver	Support for older Chipsets on newer Windows OSs
Palm Pre	Functionality extension
Windows Metafile format	Fast security fix
Windows URI problem	Fast security fix
Mac OS X 10.3	Daylight saving time patch

== See also ==
- Fan labor
- Server emulator
- Source port
- Right to repair
