= Silent Hunter 4: Wolves of the Pacific =

2007 submarine simulator

- Developer: Ubisoft Bucharest
- Publisher: Ubisoft
- Producer: Emil Gheorghe
- Designers: Dan Dimitrescu; Tudor Serban
- Platform: Windows
- Release: NA: March 20, 2007; PAL: March 22, 2007; UK: March 23, 2007
- Genre: Submarine simulator
- Modes: Single player, Multiplayer

Silent Hunter 4: Wolves of the Pacific (known in the United States as Silent Hunter: Wolves of the Pacific) is a computer submarine simulation for Windows developed by Ubisoft Bucharest and published by Ubisoft in 2007. It places the player in command of a U.S. Navy submarine during World War II and takes place in the Pacific theater. The game allows players a variety of play modes including career, single war patrol and single battle engagements. An expansion pack, The U-Boat Missions, was released in 2008.

== Gameplay ==
The simulation uses detailed and accurate 3D graphics to immerse the player in the environment of a World War II submarine. The systems of the vessel are largely functional and the player is exposed to many aspects of submarine warfare of the time. The game allows the player to choose how realistic and challenging the game experience is to be and it is designed to allow new players to easily master the basic game play, while allowing for experienced users to manually control systems such as crew management, torpedo allocation, radar, sonar and target trigonometry.

Anti-aircraft gun view

Like its predecessor Silent Hunter 3, the simulation features a dynamic campaign. The game gives players various mission objectives and unique rewards, and attempts to make each campaign a unique experience. The major naval battles of the war in the Pacific, such as the Battle of Midway, are re-enacted and players are informed of them by in-game radio messages. Unlike the earlier title, however, the game gives more specific and varied mission objectives during the campaign—including rescues, reconnaissance and agent insertions—rather than just assigning a specific patrol area.

=== Multiplayer ===
Until Ubisoft shut down the servers for the game in 2013, Silent Hunter 4 featured an online adversarial mode and gave players the opportunity to command Japanese destroyers and pit them against US submarines. Servers supported up to eight players and let them choose from several scripted and generated missions.

== Critical reception ==
Reception

Aggregate score
Aggregator	Score
Metacritic	79/100

Review scores
Publication	Score
1Up.com	B−
Edge	7/10
Eurogamer	8/10
GameSpot	8.3/10
GameSpy	3/5
IGN	(US) 8.8/10 (AU) 7/10
PALGN	8/10
PC Gamer (UK)	87%
PC Gamer (US)	78%
X-Play	3/5

The game received "generally favorable reviews" according to video game review aggregator Metacritic. Due to concerns relating to the Stolen Valor Act of 2005, as well as U.S. federal laws regarding depictions of the Medal of Honor at the time, the original release of the game awarded players with fictional decorations which in no way resembled actual United States military awards. This drew heavy criticism from many players, leading to several mods which altered the game to display actual United States decorations. The original "shelf version" of the game was never updated; all game versions, including those downloadable on Steam, continue to depict fictional awards in lieu of actual United States combat decorations.

== Expansion pack ==
On October 31, 2007 Ubisoft announced The U-Boat Missions add-on to Silent Hunter 4. It was released in Europe on February 29, 2008 and in North America on March 24, 2008. The expansion focuses on the German U-boat campaign in the Indian Ocean (the Monsun Gruppe). The U-boat Missions add-on features new strategic elements, new playable submarines, an improved navigation map, and an improved upgrade system.

With the arrival of the German campaign, players gain control over additional strategic resources other than their own submarines. These resources can be used towards the goal of sinking enemy shipping by either helping the player locate enemies – i.e. the scout planes – or by directly attacking them. These strategic support features are available only for the new German campaign in U-Boat Missions. The unlocking of these auxiliary units are based on the player's rank, and the rank is achieved based on the number of successful patrols and renown that has been gained.

Silent Hunter 4: Wolves of the Pacific Gold (Silent Hunter: Wolves of the Pacific Gold Edition in North America) was released on October 11, 2008. It includes the main game and the expansion pack.

== See also ==
- Allied submarines in the Pacific War
