= Virtual Sailor =

- Developer: Ilan Papini
- Publishers: Quality Simulations, Hangsim
- Platforms: Windows 2000; Windows XP; Windows Vista; Windows 7 Windows 8 Windows 8.1; Windows 10
- Release: 1999
- Genre: Ship simulator
- Mode: Single-player / Multiplayer

Virtual Sailor, created by Ilan Papini and published by Quality Simulations and Hangsim, is an abandonware program which allows users to operate a wide variety of vessels (sail & powered) in world-wide locations. Both the graphics and boat dynamics have been designed to be as realistic as possible, and the software also features multi-player capabilities. Users can create add-ons including boats, sceneries and marine animals to share with other players.

Papini died in February 2024 from injuries sustained after his light aircraft crashed following a bird strike.

== Gameplay ==
Players may control a variety of sail and motor powered vessels above and below the sea, interacting with other vessels, changing weather conditions, marine life and dynamic wave movements. Racing against either AI or online competitors is possible, as is exploring, recreating voyages or naval combat. It is also possible to create and edit both vessel types and marine scenery. Control panels feature compass bearing, wind speed and direction, speed, rpm, fuel level, winch settings, sail settings, radar and GPS are also included. Unusual for a vehicle simulator, users of Virtual Sailor can often roam the interiors of their ships. Weather and sea conditions are adjustable, enabling different levels of play. Vessels may be controlled by keyboard, mouse or customisable game controllers.

A large variety of vessel types and scenery have been created by users and are available on fan sites and forums.

== History ==
Virtual Sailor was first released in 1999 as a shareware program and since then has seen 13 major release versions, with many minor updates released each year. Version 7.5.1 was released on July 25, 2017. In the nine-year period between versions 7.0 and 7.5, developers turned to a new program called "Vehicle Simulator". Vehicle Simulator, first released on March 27, 2009 expands on Virtual Sailor by allowing for the simulation of automobiles and aircraft as well in addition to watercraft, while remaining backwards compatible with many of the add-ons created for Virtual Sailor.

In July 2021, Virtual Sailor NG was released. The update was a total rewrite of the original game and was redesigned for modern operating systems and next-generation graphics rendering.

Virtual Sailor NG was published on Steam in October 2022 and is still able to be purchased from the Steam storefront.

== Critical reception ==
GameSpot said of the game "Virtual Sailor simulates the entire marine environment and makes a complete sailing experience, it's multiplayer capability for online sailing and racing creates an extremely immersive marine experience."
