= Sub Command =

2001 video game

- Developer(s): Sonalysts
- Publisher(s): Electronic Arts
- Platform(s): Windows
- Release: NA: September 11, 2001; EU: 2001
- Genre(s): Submarine simulator
- Mode(s): Single-player, Multiplayer

Sub Command, subtitled Akula Seawolf 688(I) is a submarine simulator computer game designed by Sonalysts Combat Simulations and published for Windows systems by Electronic Arts in 2001. The player commands one submarine: a United States Navy Seawolf, a Russian Navy Akula, or a 688(I).

Sub Command sports three training missions, 23 single missions, and one 14 mission campaign. The campaign can be played from either the Russian or American side, so in effect there are two campaigns. The single missions range from search and rescue, battle group escort, tailing enemy boomers, spy missions, and general-purpose search-and-destroy. Many missions strictly prohibit firing on the enemy as they are expected to mirror real life Cold War objectives and get in—get out without being seen. Some missions offer more than one choice of submarine - they can play the mission as the Akula, 688(I), or the Seawolf.

In multiplayer mode, this game allows up to eight players to play each other via LAN, IPX or IP connections.
