= Silent Hunter III =

2005 submarine simulator

- Developer: Ubisoft Bucharest
- Publisher: Ubisoft
- Producer: Florin Boitor
- Designer: Tiberius Astianax Lazar
- Composer: Patrick Giraudi
- Platform: Windows
- Release: NA: March 15, 2005; PAL: March 18, 2005
- Genre: Submarine simulator
- Modes: Single player, multiplayer

Silent Hunter III is a submarine simulation developed by Ubisoft Bucharest and published by Ubisoft. It was released for Windows on March 15, 2005. Like Silent Hunter II, it places the player in command of a German U-boat during the Battle of the Atlantic in World War II.

== Gameplay ==
Silent Hunter III features a dynamic campaign. Instead of giving the player a specific set of objectives for each mission, Silent Hunter III simply assigns the player a certain patrol grid, and appropriate naval traffic, such as convoys, destroyer escorts, and task forces are automatically generated by the simulation engine. How the mission proceeds and what targets are attacked is determined by the player.

The sub's periscope view

Silent Hunter III features two methods of play - either a dynamic campaign or select historically-inspired missions, such as an operation to save the German battleship Bismarck, or the sinking of HMS Royal Oak in Scapa Flow.

German World War II veteran and sub commander Jürgen Oesten was a technical advisor for the game.

=== U-boat campaign ===
In the campaign version of the game, a player begins their career as a "Lieutenant, Jr." (corresponding to Leutnant zur See), with the choice of initial assignments to a U-boat base between 1939 and 1943. The war time and political situation of World War II is reflected in the geographical area and time period which the player begins their career.

The Silent Hunter III campaign will assign the player a certain patrol grid with appropriate naval traffic such as convoys, destroyer escorts, and task forces, automatically generated by the simulation engine. How the mission proceeds and what targets are attacked is up to the player. The player has the option to change realism settings on the submarine, adding challenges such as fuel being limited as well as various game play assistance features involving navigation, weapons, and the ability to switch to external camera mode to view the submarine's surroundings.

The most difficult realism setting in the game allows a player to manually target torpedoes for an attack on enemy vessels. In the manual targeting feature, the player must observe vessels, determine their class and nationality, as well as calculate speed, angle on the bow, and gyro angle for torpedo launch. The player has the option to set torpedo depth and spread shot with multiple weapons. De-selecting manual targeting allows a "Weapons Officer" to make these determinations for the player, although approaching targets at certain angles and determining relative motion is still a factor.

The simulation engine generates coastal and port cities, which appear as large harbors surrounded on the outskirts by town buildings, churches, and factories. It is possible for the player to sail into such ports (friendly, neutral, or hostile) and dock or engage moored targets. Some of the cities available are Portsmouth, Scapa Flow, New York City, Norfolk, Virginia, and Tampa, Florida. Although possible to sail to South America and into the Pacific, the simulation will not generate traffic or port cities for these regions.

The game features a fully 3D U-boat control room, allowing the player the ability to look around the interior of certain submarine rooms. Unlike other submarine simulations, where the crew is often heard but not seen, Silent Hunter III allows the player to see and interact with crew members. The game tracks the stats of individual crew members, such as rank, experience, morale, and decorations between missions.

== Reception ==
Reception

Aggregate score
Aggregator	Score
Metacritic	90/100

Review scores
Publication	Score
Computer Gaming World	5/5
GameSpot	8.9/10
GameSpy	5/5
GameZone	8.6/10
IGN	8.8/10
PC Format	88%
PC Gamer (US)	90%
PC Zone	83%
VideoGamer.com	7/10
X-Play	4/5

The game received "universal acclaim" upon release according to video game review aggregator Metacritic. According to NPD Group, Silent Hunter III sold 26,600 copies by June 2005.

The editors of Computer Games Magazine presented Silent Hunter III with their 2005 "Best Simulation" award, and named it the year's third-best computer game. They wrote, "Are sims dead? Not when they're this good." It also won the "Best Simulation 2005" award from PC Gamer US, whose editors called the game "simply an amazing voyage."

During the 9th Annual Interactive Achievement Awards, the Academy of Interactive Arts & Sciences nominated Silent Hunter III for "Simulation Game of the Year".
